= Maikel Benner =

Dutch baseball player (born 1980)

- Catcher / Outfielder
- Born: 24 March 1980 (age 46); Schiedam, Netherlands
- Bats: Right Throws: Right
Medals
Men's baseball
Representing Netherlands
European Baseball Championship
Gold medal – first place	2001 Germany	National team
Gold medal – first place	2003 Netherlands	National team
Gold medal – first place	2005 Czech Republic	National team

Maikel Benner (born 24 March 1980) is a Dutch former baseball player. He was a catcher for the Netherlands national team at the 2004 Summer Olympics, 2006 World Baseball Classic, and other international tournaments. He also played in the Honkbal Hoofdklasse, the top Dutch league.

== International career ==
Benner debuted for the Netherlands youth national team in 1996, playing in youth European and World championships. He was first called up to the senior national team in February 2000. He was on the Dutch team that won the 2001 and 2003 European Baseball Championships, serving as one of the catchers for Eelco Jansen's no-hitter against Croatia in 2003. Benner also played in the 2002 Intercontinental Cup.

In the 2002 Haarlem Baseball Week, Benner had a .368 batting average, playing in all six games. Prior to the tournament, he mostly served as a backup to Johnny Balentina and Chairon Isenia. He was with the national team for the 2003 Baseball World Cup, but did not play behind Isenia and Sidney de Jong.

In the 2004 Summer Olympics in Athens, the Dutch team finished sixth. Benner batted 0-for-4 with two walks, playing in parts of four games. Just before the Olympics, he was on the Dutch team that won the 2004 Haarlem Baseball Week. He also was on the Dutch team that won the 2005 European championship, again going 0-for-4 with two walks.

In the 2006 World Baseball Classic, Benner had one pinch-hit at bat, striking out in a win over Panama. He retired from the national team the next month. He played in 42 games for the national team.

== Honkbal Hoofdklasse ==
Benner made his debut at the age of 16 in the Hoofdklasse with Sparta-Feyenoord in 1996. In 2000, he moved to the more storied Rotterdam club, Neptunus. He won the Holland Series every season he played for Neptunus. In a 2002 playoff series win over Pioniers, he had three hits then five hits in back-to-back games. Benner was named the best catcher in the Hoofdklasse in 2003 and 2004. He had 22 runs scored, 21 runs batted in, and 7 stolen bases in 2005.

After the 2005 season, Benner and fellow national team players Percy Isenia, Robin van Doornspeek, Rob Cordemans, and Harvey Monte left for ADO. After two seasons in The Hague, he joined Amsterdam Pirates, winning the 2008 Holland Series under manager Rikkert Faneyte. He batted over .300 in two seasons with Amsterdam, his final two seasons in the top Dutch league. He was third in the league in runs. He moved to lower-level Vlaardingen Holy for the 2010 season.
