= Percy Isenia =

Dutch baseball player (born 1976)

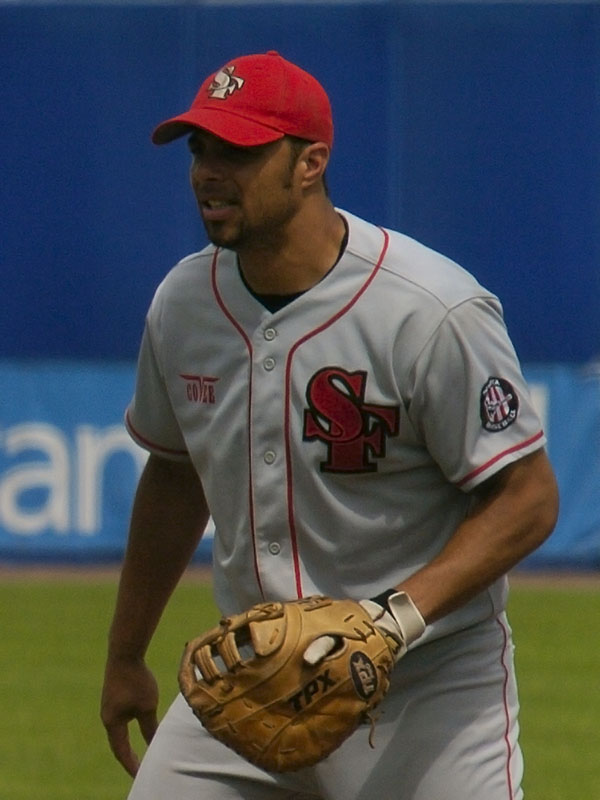
- Isenia with Sparta-Feyenoord in 2008
- First baseman / Designated hitter
- Born: 25 December 1976 (age 49); Zwijndrecht, Netherlands
- Bats: Right Throws: Right
Medals
Men's baseball
Representing Netherlands
Intercontinental Cup
Silver medal – second place	2006 Taiwan	National team
European Baseball Championship
Gold medal – first place	1999 Italy	National team
Gold medal – first place	2001 Germany	National team
Gold medal – first place	2003 Netherlands	National team
Gold medal – first place	2005 Czech Republic	National team

Percy Paul Isenia (born 25 December 1976) is a Dutch former baseball first baseman who played for the Netherlands national team and several Honkbal Hoofdklasse teams. He played in the 2000 and 2008 Summer Olympics and 2006 World Baseball Classic. He also managed the Netherlands women's national team at the 2010 and 2012 Women's Baseball World Cup.

== Playing career ==
Isenia debuted with the Netherlands national team in the 1999 World Port Tournament, batting .304/.385/.478 and helping the Netherlands to the title. He was 3-for-9 with a double, triple, and 5 walks in the 1999 European Championship, also won by the Dutch. In the 1999 Intercontinental Cup, he hit for a .320/.370/.360 slash line as the best Dutch hitter in a disappointing tournament for the team. He won the national Guus van de Heijden Award as the best national player under 23.

In 2000, Isenia, playing for Neptunus, tied for fourth in Honkbal Hoofdklasse with 35 runs, tied for eighth with three home runs, and tied for fifth with 29 runs batted in (RBI). In the 2000 Haarlem Baseball Week, Isenia was 4-for-15 with a double, two walks, two RBI and a run. He then hit .250/.280/.333 as the Dutch first baseman in the 2000 Summer Olympics in Sydney, as the Netherlands finished fifth.

In 2001, Isenia helped the Netherlands win the European championship, batting fifth and playing first base in the gold medal game. He batted .250/.324/.375 but led the team with 9 RBI. His 39 RBI for Neptunus in 2001 were second in Hoofdklasse to Mike Crouwel. He helped Neptunus to the title. In the World Port Tournament, he hit two home runs for the silver medalists. In the 2001 Baseball World Cup, Isenia batted .250 with one home run, playing all 10 games for the Orange.

In the 2002 Intercontinental Cup, Isenia hit .182 with one of only two homers for the Netherlands, with Hensley Meulens belting the other. In the Dutch league that year, Isenia excelled. He hit .340 (4th in Hoofdklasse), had 67 hits (second to Dirk van 't Klooster), scored 29 runs (10th), smacked 16 doubles (leading the league, one ahead of Raily Legito), hit 3 homers (tied for 8th) and drove in 43 (second-best, one behind leader Sidney de Jong. During 2002 Haarlem Baseball Week, he went 2-for-16 with one walk, run, and RBI.

Neptunus won another title in 2003 thanks to Isenia. He tied Norbert Lokhorst for the lead with 11 doubles and his 4 homers were one behind leader Evert-Jan 't Hoen. He tied van 't Klooster for 5th in RBI (26). In the 2003 World Port Tournament, he hit .243 and led the team with 7 RBI. He hit one of the two homers in the tournament that year, with teammate Tjerk Smeets socking the other. During the European championship, playing alongside his brother Chairon, Isenia was 3-for-6 in two games for the Dutch champions. In the Baseball World Cup, Isenia was the designated hitter (DH) so that Sharnol Adriana could be used at first. Isenia batted .333 with 1 home run and 5 RBI in six games.

In 2004, the 27-year-old did not finish among the Hoofdklasse leaders in any offensive categories for the first time in five years. Isenia did not make the Dutch team for the 2004 Summer Olympics, as Yurendell de Caster was chosen at first base instead with de Jong as the backup. During Haarlem Baseball Week, Isenia went 2-for-11 with one double, walk, run, and 3 RBI.

Isenia hit .271/.347/.349 for Neptunus in 2005 as they won their sixth straight title. In the 2005 Baseball World Cup, he batted .289 to help the Dutch finish fourth, their best finish to that point. He had 7 doubles, 11 runs and 8 RBI in 10 games. He made the All-Tournament team at first base. Isenia also did well in the 2005 European Championship, tying Ivanon Coffie for third in hits (14), finishing fourth in slugging (.710) and tying for third in RBI (10); Jairo Ramos Gizzi beat him out for All-Star honors at first base.

In the 2006 World Baseball Classic, Isenia struck out against J.C. Romero as a pinch-hitter for Adriana in the 8th inning of the team's first game, a loss to Puerto Rico. In the third game, Isenia was 2-for-4 with a walk as the #5 hitter and DH in a mercy rule win over Panama. Overall, his .400/.500/.400 slash line produced a better OPS than the team's other 1B/DH options, major leaguer Randall Simon and minor-league veteran Adriana. Isenia hit .273 with three walks in the 2006 Haarlem Baseball Week and scored the tying run in the finale against Cuba. In 2006, he moved to SV ADO and his production dropped to a .240/.308/.331 slash line. He tied Harvey Monte for fifth in doubles. He hit .226 with 2 home runs, 7 runs, and 8 RBI in 8 games in the 2006 Intercontinental Cup to help the Dutch to a silver medal.

Isenia batted .282/.331/.444 in his final season with ADO in 2007. He was 4-for-19 with a double and 3 RB in 6 games in the 2007 World Port Tournament. Manager Robert Eenhoorn selected Isenia for the national team at the 2008 Summer Olympics in Beijing. He batted 3-for-10 with a home run in the Olympics.

Isenia moved to Sparta-Feyenoord in 2008, then Amsterdam Pirates in 2011. He won the league's home run derby in 2010 and helped Amsterdam win the 2011 Holland Series, hitting a home run in the championship series. He hit a go-ahead home run in the 2013 Hoofdklasse All-Star Game. He finished his Hoofdklasse career after the 2014 season.

== Coaching career ==
Isenia was an early promoter of women's baseball in the Netherlands. He was the manager of the Netherlands national team in the 2010 Women's World Cup, becoming the first European team to compete in the tournament. The Dutch women lost all their games in the tournament. He managed the team at the 2012 World Cup, where the team won its first game, defeating Cuba in the seventh-place game to finish second-to-last in the tournament. Isenia was replaced by fellow former national team player Eddie Dix for the 2014 World Cup.

Isenia has worked as an advisor to Rotterdam Topsport.
