= Dave Draijer =

Dutch baseball player (born 1973)

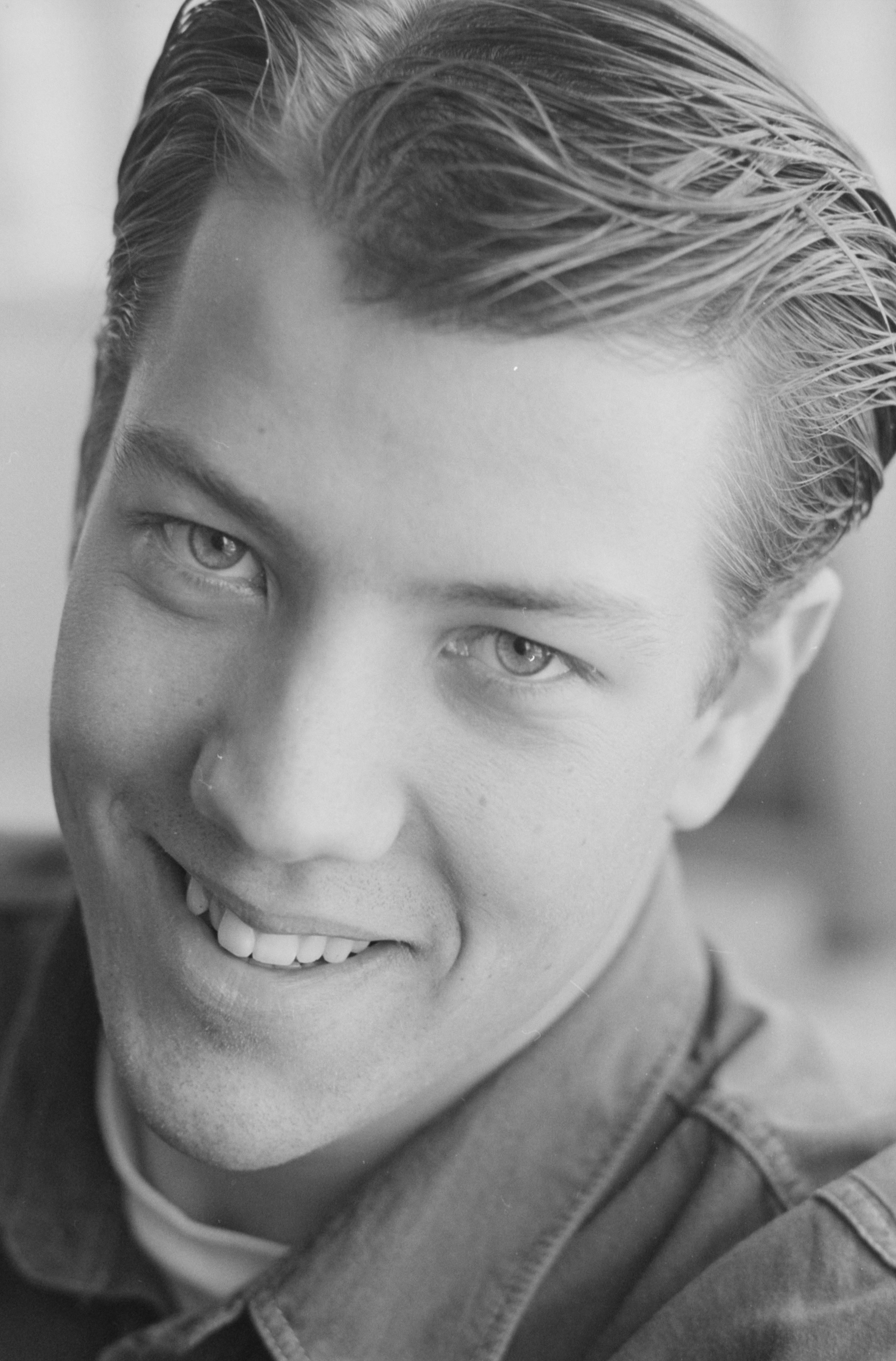
- Draijer in 1996
- Pitcher
- Born: 30 September 1973 (age 52); Heemstede, Netherlands
- Bats: Right Throws: Right
Medals
Men's baseball
Representing Netherlands
Intercontinental Cup
Silver medal – second place	2006 Taiwan	National team
European Baseball Championship
Gold medal – first place	2001 Germany	National team
Gold medal – first place	2003 Netherlands	National team
Gold medal – first place	2005 Czech Republic	National team
Gold medal – first place	2007 Spain	National team
Silver medal – second place	2010 Germany	National team

Dorotheus Wilhelmus "Dave" Draijer (born 30 September 1973) is a Dutch former professional baseball pitcher. Draijer played for the Netherlands national team in two Summer Olympics.

At the 2004 Summer Olympics in Athens, the Dutch team finished sixth. Draijer threw 2 2/3 innings, allowing two unearned runs. Originally, he was not selected for the 2008 Summer Olympics but joined the team after an injury to fellow reliever Loek van Mil Draijer pitched in three games, allowing one run in 1 2/3 innings as the Dutch finished in seventh place.

Draijer pitched in one 2006 World Baseball Classic (WBC) game, allowing a home run to Carlos Beltrán of Puerto Rico. Draijer hit the next batter, Javy López, which drew a warning from the umpire. Draijer escaped the inning without allowing any more runs. He trained with the team ahead of the 2009 WBC but was not selected for the final roster.

Draijer joined the Dutch national team in 2001, pitching in the World Port Tournament and European championship. He won European championships with the Netherlands in 2001, 2003, 2005, and 2007. He was named the best pitcher at the 2006 Haarlem Baseball Week tournament after earning three saves in three games. He pitched the final inning of a seven-inning no-hitter against France in the 2010 European championship, allowing one walk. He also was part of the team in the 2005 and 2007 Baseball World Cup, 2006 Intercontinental Cup, and several other Haarlem Baseball Week tournaments.

Draijer also pitched in the Honkbal Hoofdklasse, the top Dutch baseball league. He was a bat boy for RCH-Pinguins growing up. In 1999, he moved to HCAW, and in 2005, he joined Pioniers, primarily working as a reliever. Aside from one season with RCH-Pinguins in 2009, he pitched with the Hoofddorp club through 2013, then made one appearance for RCH-Pinguins in August 2023. He was also a pitching coach with Pioniers from 2011 to 2014.

Several of Draijer's relatives also played baseball, including Max Draijer, who also won the NAIA World Series with the Tennessee Wesleyan Bulldogs in 2021.
