= Tetsuhiro Monna =

Japanese baseball player (born 2001)

- Pitcher
- Born: 30 May 1970 (age 56); Hamamatsu, Shizuoka Prefecture, Japan
- Batted: Left Threw: Left

debut
- April 14, 1993, for the Yomiuri Giants

Last appearance
- May 8, 1996, for the Yomiuri Giants

NPB statistics
- Win–loss record: 1–3
- Earned run average: 3.38
- Strikeouts: 73
- Stats at Baseball Reference

Teams
- Yomiuri Giants (1993–1994, 1996)

Tetsuhiro Monna (門奈哲寛, Monna Tetsuhiro; born 30 May 1970) is a Japanese former professional baseball pitcher. Monna was part of the Yomiuri Giants of Nippon Professional Baseball (NPB) from 1993 to 1999. He later played in the Netherlands and Croatia, representing the Croatian national baseball team from 2003 to 2005.

== Early career ==
Monna was born on 30 May 1970 in Hamamatsu in the Shizuoka Prefecture and graduated from Nihon University, where he played baseball. He was the Yomiuri Giants’ second pick in the 1992 Nippon Professional Baseball draft, following Hideki Matsui.

== Career ==
=== Yomiuri Giants ===
Monna made his professional debut with the Yomiuri Giants in 1993, appearing in 33 games during the season and finishing the season with a 1–2 record. In 1994, he appeared in six games, recording one loss. In 1996, he pitched in six games. He was released by the Giants after the 1999 season.

=== European career ===
In 2000, Monna joined SV ADO of the Dutch Honkbal Hoofdklasse, where he played for three seasons, until 2002.

In 2003, Monna joined Nada Split of the Croatian league. He rapidly became the best pitcher in the league and acquired Croatian citizenship in order to play for the Croatian national team.

== International career ==
Monna represented Croatia in the 2003 and 2005 editions of the European Baseball Championship. In 2003, he appeared in three games, recording two wins, against Sweden and Germany. He finished the tournament with 26 strikeouts and an ERA of 1.80 over 20.0 innings pitched. He received the Best Pitcher Award for having the best win-loss record of the tournament, sharing the award with Patrick Beljaards, who earned it based on ERA.
