= Rob Cordemans =

Dutch baseball player (born 1971)

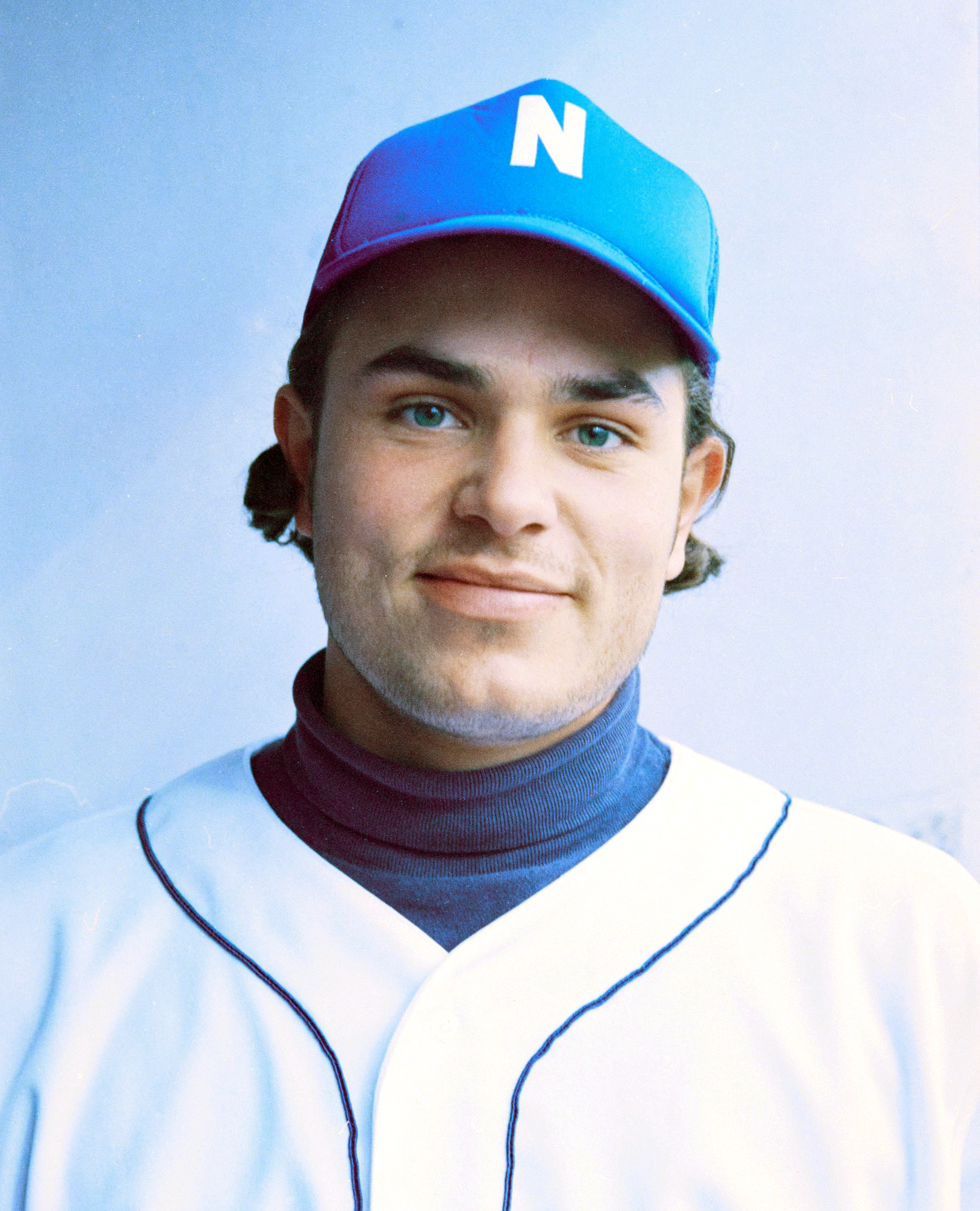
- Cordemans in 1995
- Pitcher
- Born: October 31, 1974 (age 51); Schiedam, Netherlands
- Bats: Right Throws: Right
- Stats at Baseball Reference
Medals
Men's baseball
Representing Netherlands
Baseball World Cup
Gold medal – first place	2011 Panama City	National team
Intercontinental Cup
Silver medal – second place	2006 Taichung	National team
Silver medal – second place	2010 Taichung	National team
European Baseball Championship
Gold medal – first place	1995 Netherlands	National team
Gold medal – first place	1999 Italy	National team
Gold medal – first place	2001 Germany	National team
Gold medal – first place	2003 Netherlands	National team
Gold medal – first place	2005 Prague	National team
Gold medal – first place	2007 Montjuïc	National team
Silver medal – second place	2010 Stuttgart	National team
Gold medal – first place	2014 Brno	National team
Gold medal – first place	2016 Hoofddorp	National team
Gold medal – first place	2019 Bonn	National team
World Port Tournament
Silver medal – second place	2015 Netherlands	National team
France International Baseball Tournament
Gold medal – first place	2014 Sénart	National team
Gold medal – first place	2016 Sénart	National team

Rob Cordemans (born October 31, 1974) is a Dutch former baseball player who pitched for the Netherlands national team in four Summer Olympics, four World Baseball Classics, and other international competitions. He was the winning pitcher in the 2011 Baseball World Cup championship game.

Cordemans also pitched in the Honkbal Hoofdklasse, the top Dutch baseball league, from 1994 to 2019, winning the league's best pitcher award many times. He set the league career records for games pitched, wins, strikeouts, and the single-season record for lowest earned run average (ERA).

== Playing career ==
=== College ===
Cordemans attended Indian River State College, where he was the 1997 Florida Junior College pitcher of the year. His 1.47 ERA was fourth-best among junior college pitchers. However, he suffered an arm injury the next year and was not drafted out of college. He was a finesse pitcher, and he threw a mid- to upper-80s fastball and an upper-70s changeup. Cordemans signed with the Montreal Expos in late 1998 but chose to return to the Netherlands rather than play in the minors.

=== International career ===
Cordemans was a fixture on the Netherlands national team in international competitions for two decades. He debuted with the team in 1995. In 1996, he won the Guus van der Heijden Memorial Trophy as the best national team player under the age of 23.

==== Olympics ====
Cordemans competed in four consecutive Olympic Games for the Netherlands.

He began his Olympic career as a 21-year-old pitcher at the 1996 Summer Olympics in Atlanta. Despite his lofty 6.94 ERA, Cordemans was the winning pitcher in both of the club's games during the preliminary round of the tournament, allowing 5 runs in 5 1/3 innings in a mercy rule win over Australia and 4 runs in 6 1/3 innings in a win over Italy.

At the 2000 Olympics in Sydney, Cordemans had a 1–1 record with a 2.51 ERA. He again beat Italy but lost to the United States. He was called a junkball pitcher by the Associated Press and threw an 88 mph (142 km/h) fastball and 66 mph (106 km/h) changeup against the U.S.

Cordemans participated in his third Olympics during the 2004 Summer Games in Athens. He started against Italy again, not earning the win in a Dutch victory, and was a reliever in a mercy rule loss to Australia. He had a 7.88 ERA and 5 strikeouts in 8 innings.

His fourth appearance at the Olympic games was at the 2008 Summer Games in Beijing. He pitched in relief in three games, allowing 5 runs in 8 innings.

==== World Baseball Classic ====
Cordemans pitched once in the 2006 World Baseball Classic (WBC), allowing one earned run in 2 2/3 innings. He again pitched for the Dutch national team at the 2009 WBC. During the first round of the tournament held at Hiram Bithorn Stadium in San Juan, Puerto Rico, Cordemans entered two separate wins over the Dominican Republic in middle relief. He pitched 2 2/3 scoreless innings on March 7 and 2 scoreless innings on March 10. He then pitched two more scoreless relief innings in a loss to Venezuela.

Cordemans fared worse in the 2013 WBC, going 1–1 with an 8.53 ERA in two starts. He pitched in his final WBC in 2017, allowing three runs and lasting only one inning in a losing start against Israel. He said he was happy to make the Dutch team for a fourth WBC.

==== Other competitions ====
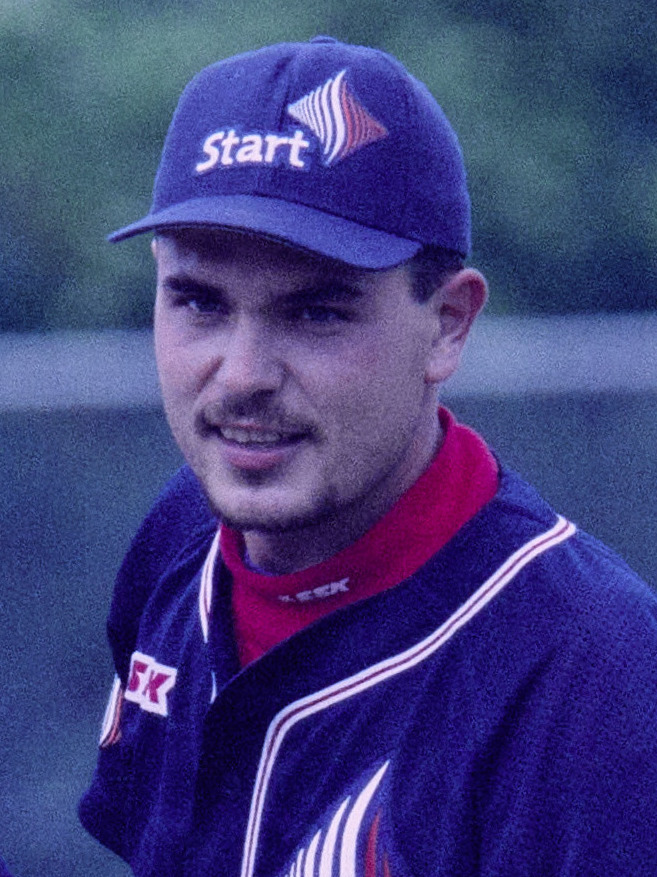
Cordemans in 1998

Cordemans was also named to the Dutch roster for the European Baseball Championship in 1995, 1999, 2001, 2003, 2005, 2007, 2010, 2014, 2016, and 2019. He was also with the team for the 2006 and 2010 Intercontinental Cup, the gold-medal-winning 2011 Baseball World Cup, 2014 and 2016 France International Baseball Tournament, 2015 World Port Tournament, 2015 and 2019 WBSC Premier12 and the Africa/Europe 2020 Olympic Qualification tournament.

Cordemans threw a complete game against the U.S. in the 1998 Baseball World Cup, allowing one run and three hits. He pitched the first six innings of a seven-inning no-hitter against France in the 2010 European championship, allowing one walk. He was the winning pitcher in the 2011 World Cup championship game.

=== Honkbal Hoofdklasse ===
Cordemans debuted in the Honkbal Hoofdklasse with Neptunus in 1994. He won his first Pitcher of the Year award in 1999 while playing for Kinheim. His 14–2 and 2.20 ERA led the league. He was also named the MVP of the playoffs in 1998 and 2001.

Cordemans returned to Neptunus for the 2000 season. His record declined to 8–4 though his 94 strikeouts ranked fourth in the league. An 11-strikeout complete game win over Rimini helped Neptunus to a European Cup title.

In 2002, Cordemans went 10–2 with a 0.47 ERA and earned his second Pitcher of the Year award. He repeated in 2003, with a 12–1 record, 0.93 ERA, and 106 strikeouts in 106 innings. In 2004, he was named the MVP of the Holland Series, earning two wins as Neptunus won the championship. He was named the best right-handed pitcher in the league in 2005, 2006 (playing for ADO), 2008, when he went 9–0 with a 0.86 ERA for Sparta-Feyenoord, 2009, and 2010.

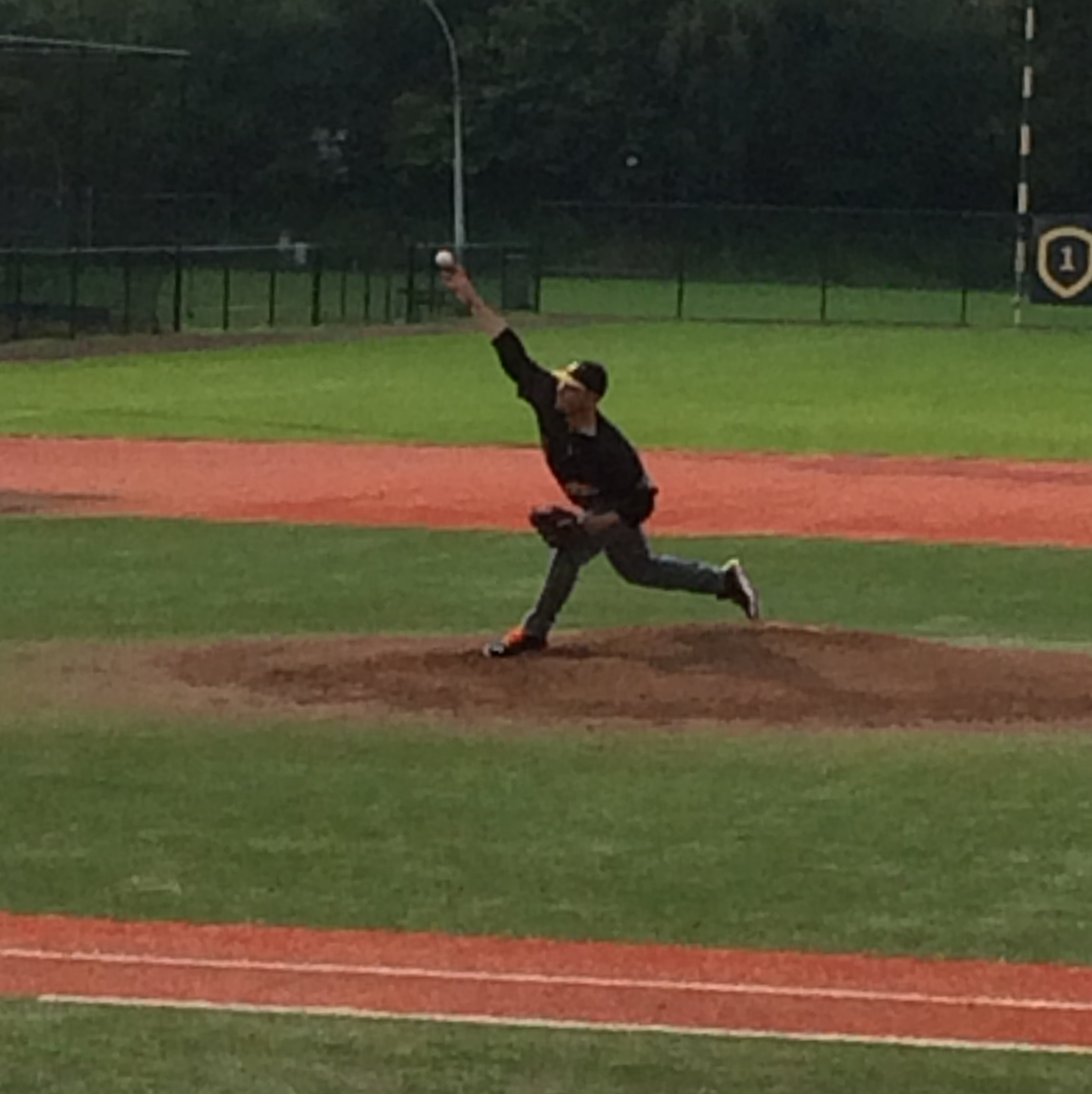
Cordemans pitching in a 2017 playoff game for the Amsterdam Pirates

In 2011, his second season with Amsterdam Pirates, he was again named the best pitcher in the league as well as the sportsman of the year for Amsterdam, besting a beach volleyball and tennis player. His 0.31 ERA was the lowest ever in a Hoofdklasse season. He went 9–1 and earned his 1,500th career strikeout and 140th career win in the league. He won the league's best pitcher and MVP awards in 2012 after posting a 0.22 ERA and striking out 94 batters while walking 5 in 80 2/3 innings. He became the team's pitching coach after the season, while continuing to play. He was named the best pitcher for the third consecutive season in 2013. In 2014, he was 8–0 with a 1.53 ERA, throwing his record fifth complete game in the Holland Series, though Amsterdam lost to Neptunus.

Cordemans was named the best pitcher of the 2015 European Cup after throwing a shutout over San Marino. He led the Hoofdklasse with a 0.84 ERA and was again named the league's best pitcher that season. After missing the 2016 season with a shoulder injury, he won his final best pitcher award in 2017, after going 10–0 with a 1.58 ERA.

Cordemans pitched for Amsterdam in the Hoofdklasse through 2021. He was the first pitcher in the league with 200 wins, 2,000 strikeouts, and 2,000 innings pitched. He also holds the league record for games pitched.

=== Taiwan (2007) ===
Cordemans had a trial for the Uni-President Lions of Chinese Professional Baseball League in Taiwan for 2007. He was released on 28 May after going 3–4 with 4.50 ERA.

== Personal life ==
Cordemans has children.
