= Sidney de Jong =

Dutch baseball player (1979–2026)

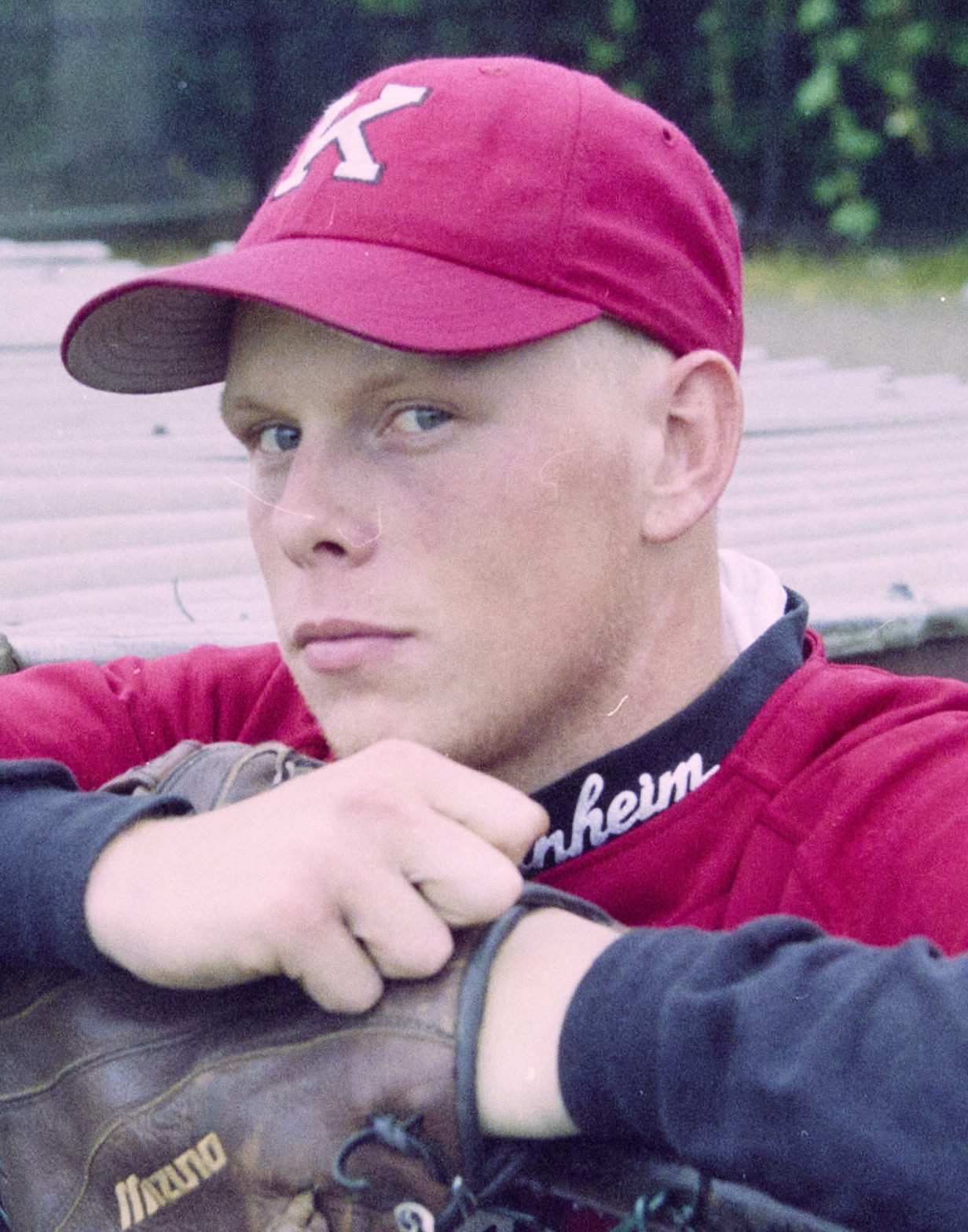
- de Jong in 2001
- Catcher
- Born: 14 April 1979; Amsterdam, Netherlands
- Died: 7 January 2026 (aged 46); Almere, Netherlands
- Batted: Right Threw: Right
- Stats at Baseball Reference
Medals
Men's baseball
Representing Netherlands
Baseball World Cup
Gold medal – first place	2011 Panama	National team
Intercontinental Cup
Silver medal – second place	2006 Taiwan	National team
Silver medal – second place	2010 Taiwan	National team
European Baseball Championship
Gold medal – first place	2001 Germany	National team
Gold medal – first place	2003 Netherlands	National team
Gold medal – first place	2005 Czech Republic	National team
Gold medal – first place	2007 Spain	National team
Silver medal – second place	2010 Germany	National team

Sidney de Jong (14 April 1979 – 7 January 2026) was a Dutch professional baseball catcher and coach. He played for the Netherlands national team in international tournaments, including the 2004 and 2008 Summer Olympics and 2006 and 2009 World Baseball Classic tournaments.

== Career ==
de Jong played 15 seasons in the Honkbal Hoofdklasse from 1998 to 2011. In his debut season with Amsterdam Pirates, he played in 40 games and hit .450. He went on to play with Pirates (1998–2000), Kinheim (2001–2002), HCAW (2003–2006) and again Amsterdam Pirates (2007–2012), winning championships with Amsterdam in 2008 and 2011. In 2001, de Jong played college baseball at the College of Southern Idaho in the United States, leading the team with a .358 batting average. In 2002, he was the most valuable player in the Hoofdklasse. He batted .300 or higher in 14 of his 15 seasons in the Hoofdklasse. After retiring as a player, he managed Pirates during the 2013 season.

de Jong represented the Netherlands at the 2004 Summer Olympics in Athens, where the Dutch finished sixth. Following the Dutch winning the 2011 Baseball World Cup, he and teammates, including Didi Gregorius and Xander Bogaerts, were knighted. He was named the best catcher of the 2005 European Championship, after hitting a grand slam in the championship game, and the 2007 Baseball World Cup.

During his international career, de Jong appeared in 203 games, including two Olympic Games (2004 Athens and 2008 Beijing), two World Baseball Classics (2006 and 2009), five World Cups (2003, 2005, 2007, 2009, and 2011), five European championships (2001, 2003, 2005, 2007, and 2010), and three Intercontinental Cups (2002, 2006, and 2010).

After his retirement as a player, de Jong was a coach for the Netherlands starting in 2014 under managers Steve Janssen (2014–2017), Hensley Meulens (2015–2019), and Evert-Jan 't Hoen (since 2018). In 2017, de Jong acted as national team manager during the World Port Tournament. That year, he also became the coach of the national under-23 team, which he coached through 2024.

== Death ==
de Jong died on 7 January 2026, at the age of 46. A public memorial was held for de Jong at the Amsterdam Pirates' ballpark. Prior to his death, he was expected to be a coach for the Netherlands in the 2026 World Baseball Classic.
