= Vince Rooi =

Dutch baseball player (born 1981)

- Third baseman
- Born: December 13, 1981 (age 44); Amsterdam, Netherlands
- Bats: Right Throws: Right
Medals
Men's baseball
Representing Netherlands
Baseball World Cup
| Gold medal – first place | 2011 Panama | National team |
European Baseball Championship
| Gold medal – first place | 2003 Netherlands | National team |
| Gold medal – first place | 2007 Spain | National team |
| Silver medal – second place | 2010 Germany | National team |

McVince Alleza Rooi (born 13 December 1981) is a Dutch former baseball player who played professionally from 1999 to 2018. He also played on the Dutch national team in the 2009 World Baseball Classic and other international tournaments.

== Baseball career ==
Rooi began playing baseball at the age of 9 and trained in the Amsterdam Pirates program. He signed with the Montreal Expos in August 1998 and played in Minor League Baseball in the Expos/Washington Nationals and Pittsburgh Pirates organizations from 1999 to 2006. He played much of his minor league career alongside fellow Dutch player Danny Rombley. Rooi was named to the Florida State League All-Star Game in 2003. He began playing with Kinheim in the Honkbal Hoofdklasse in 2005, winning the Holland Series after the minor league season ended.

After his American career ended, Rooi played for Kinheim in 2007 and 2008. In 2009, he moved to the Amsterdam Pirates. He was named the most valuable player of the Hoofdklasse in 2011. He then re-teamd with Rombley by playing for Pioniers beginning in 2013, and ended his playing career with HCAW from 2016 to 2018.

Rooi joined the Netherlands national team for the 2001 Baseball World Cup. He was named the best defensive player, home run king, and best third baseman at the 2003 European Baseball Championship, which the Dutch won. He was not selected for the team for the 2006 World Baseball Classic (WBC), returning to the national team in 2007. He batted 0-for-7 coming off the bench at the 2007 European championship. He batted 2-for-14 in four games in the 2009 WBC. He hit 3-for-14 in the 2010 European championship, where the Netherlands finished second. He was again a part-time player for the Dutch team that won the 2011 World Cup, batting 4-for-7 with 5 RBI in three games. He dealt with a shoulder injury in 2012, which prevented him from playing for the national team. He returned to the national team for the 2013 World Port Tournament.

== Personal life ==
Rooi is married and has two children. After his playing career, he became a Christian minister in Hilversum, North Holland. Rooi's father is from the Netherlands Antilles, and his mother is from Suriname.

Rooi's brother-in-law, Donavan van Embricqs, a helicopter pilot, disappeared in Suriname in 2015. His remains were returned to his relatives in 2018.
