= Raily Legito =

Curaçaoan baseball player (born 1978)

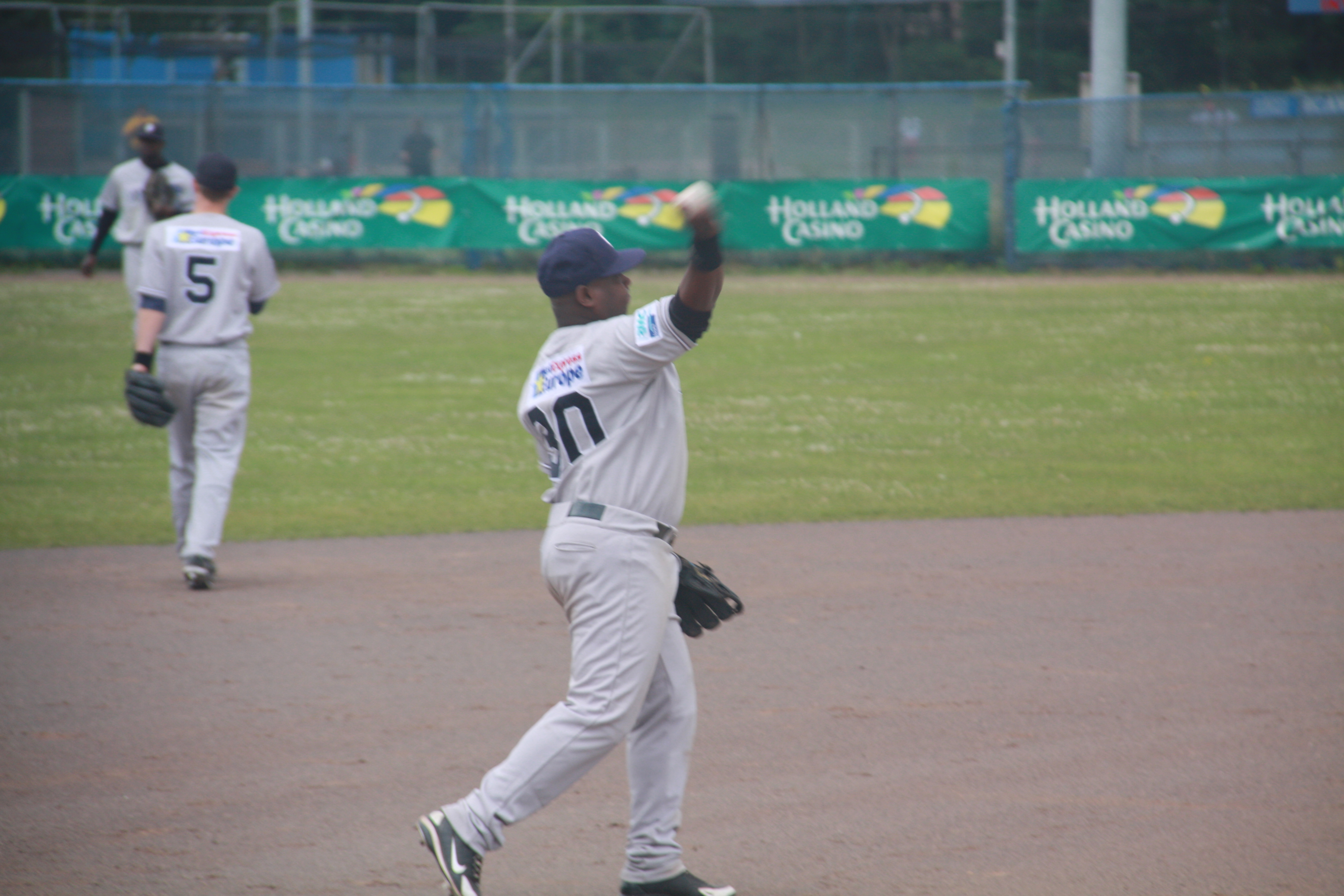
- Legito (center) with Neptunus in 2009
- Infielder
- Born: July 26, 1978 (age 48); Willemstad, Curaçao
- Bats: Right Throws: Right
- Stats at Baseball Reference
Medals
Men's baseball
Representing Netherlands
Intercontinental Cup
Silver medal – second place	2006 Taiwan	National team
European Baseball Championship
Gold medal – first place	1999 Italy	National team
Gold medal – first place	2001 Germany	National team
Gold medal – first place	2003 Netherlands	National team
Gold medal – first place	2005 Czech Republic	National team
Gold medal – first place	2007 Spain	National team
Silver medal – second place	2010 Germany	National team

Raylinos Joaquin Legito (born July 26, 1978) is a Curaçaoan former baseball player who played for the Netherlands national team in three Summer Olympics, the 2006 World Baseball Classic, and other international tournaments. He played two summers for the Dominican Summer League Dodgers, then in the Honkbal Hoofdklasse, winning nine Holland Series titles with Neptunus.

== International career ==
Legito, a right-handed infielder, represented the Netherlands in three Olympics, getting one hit in each competition. At the 2000 Summer Olympics in Sydney, the team finished fifth with Legito batting 1-for-10. Four years later at the 2004 Summer Olympics in Athens, they finished sixth. He batted 1-for-17 with three walks in Athens. At the 2008 Summer Olympics in Beijing, the Dutch team finished seventh. He hit 1-for-15 in his final Olympics.

Legito played for the Netherlands in many other baseball tournaments. He batted 2-for-5 in the 2006 World Baseball Classic. He was named the shortstop on the All-Star team for the 2003 European Baseball Championship, the best defensive player of the 2005 European championship, and the outstanding defensive player and part of the all-tournament team of the 2007 European championship. He was part of Dutch teams that won five consecutive European championship from 1999 to 2007. He had the best batting average and most runs scored in the 2010 European championship.

Legito was named the most valuable player of the 2003 World Port Tournament. He also played in the 2006 Intercontinental Cup and 2005 and 2009 Baseball World Cup. He retired from the national team after the 2011 World Port Tournament. He played in 257 international games for the Dutch team, most in the country's history.

Legito played for the Curaçao national baseball team at the 2015 World Port Tournament.

== Professional career ==
Legito signed with the Los Angeles Dodgers on November 24, 1996. He was named a Dominican Summer League (DSL) All-Star in 1997 and played in the DSL again in 1998. He moved the Honkbal Hoofdklasse in 1999, first with ADO in the Hague then with PSV in Eindhoven in 2002 and 2003. He then joined Neptunus in Rotterdam, where he would play the rest of his club career. He was named the best hitter in the league in 2006. He played his last game in the Hoofdklasse on 8 October 2016, winning his ninth championship with Neptunus.

== Post-playing career ==
Legito coached the Curaçao national team at the World Port Tournament in 2017 and 2019.

Legito managed Neptunus in 2022. He left the team after one season, with the team losing in the Holland Series.

Legito has worked as an project manager for the Laureus Foundation in the Netherlands.

== Personal life ==
Legito's son Raydley played under Legito at Neptunus in 2022. Raydley played college baseball for the Southwest Baptist Bearcats and Panola College Ponies and debuted with the Netherlands national team at the 2026 Haarlem Baseball Week.
