= Chris Demetral (baseball) =

Greek-American baseball player and manager (born 1969)

- Infielder / Manager
- Born: 8 December 1969 (age 56); San Diego, California, U. S.
- Bats: Left Throws: Right
Medals
Men's baseball
Representing Greece
European Baseball Championship
Silver medal – second place	2003 Netherlands	National team

James Chris Demetral (born 8 December 1969) is a Greek-American baseball manager and former professional player. He played in the 2004 Summer Olympics for the host Greece national team. He is currently the manager of the Greek team.

Demetral attended Sterling Heights High School in Sterling Heights, Michigan and Western Michigan University. He was an all Mid-American Conference second baseman in 1991. He was the 31st round pick of the 1991 MLB draft by the Los Angeles Dodgers. He was a Florida State League All-Star in 1993. He played in Triple-A in seven seasons, from 1995 to 2001, never reaching the major leagues. He left the Dodgers for the Texas Rangers organization in 1998 and spent spring training in 2001 with the Detroit Tigers.

Demetral was on Greece's debut national baseball team, at the 2003 European Baseball Championship. He was recruited to the team by Baltimore Orioles owner Peter Angelos. The Greeks finished second, and Demetral was named the second basemen on the all-tournament team. Greece finished seventh in the 2004 Olympics. He became a Greek citizen in 2004, before the Olympics. He recruited players for the 2008 Olympics qualifiers, but the Greek federation stopped funding the team before the tournament. He last played for Greece in the 2014 European Championship. Demetral was named Greece's manager in July 2023.

== Personal life ==
After ending his professional baseball career, Demetral became an investment advisor.

Demetral's uncle is former MLB and Greece national team manager Jim Essian. He has three brothers who also played for Greece. His brother Scott was an assistant coach at Western Michigan and is a scout for Greece. His son played college baseball at Florence–Darlington Technical College and for the Northern Illinois Huskies and later for him with Greece.
