= Ralph Milliard =

Dutch baseball player (born 1973)

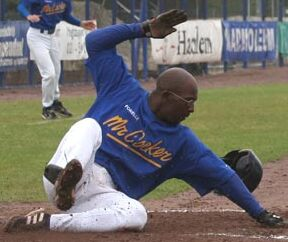
- Milliard in 2007
- Second baseman
- Born: 30 December 1973 (age 52); Willemstad, Curaçao
- Batted: Right Threw: Right

MLB debut
- May 12, 1996, for the Florida Marlins

Last MLB appearance
- September 27, 1998, for the New York Mets

MLB statistics
- Batting average: .172
- Hits: 16
- Runs batted in: 3
- Stats at Baseball Reference

Teams
- Florida Marlins (1996–1997); New York Mets (1998)

Ralph Gregory Milliard (born 30 December 1973) is a Dutch-Curaçaoan former baseball player and baseball coach. He played in Major League Baseball (MLB) for the Florida Marlins (1996–1997) and New York Mets (1998). Milliard played for the Netherlands national team in two Summer Olympics and other international tournaments. At the 2000 Summer Olympics in Sydney, where he and his team placed fifth. Four years later at the 2004 Summer Olympics in Athens, they placed sixth.

== Early life ==
Milliard started playing baseball at age four in his native country Curaçao. When he was nine, he moved with his family to Soest, Utrecht, where he played with the Knickerbockers club in the youth divisions.

== Playing career ==
Milliard was selected at age 14 to be part of the Netherlands national youth team, the Cadetten. At age 16, he moved to HCAW and played at the highest Dutch league, the Honkbal Hoofdklasse, and developed into a talented shortstop and second baseman.

=== Florida Marlins ===
In 1992, Milliard signed a contract with the Florida Marlins. He played in total ten seasons as a professional, three of which were in MLB. His strong point was his superb fielding as a shortstop and second baseman. In his first professional season, he tied for the Gulf Coast League lead with 15 doubles in 1993. He was a Midwest League All-Star in 1994, leading the league with 97 runs scored. He played in the Double-A All-Star Game in 1995 and led the Eastern League with 104 runs, a Portland Sea Dogs record. He played in the Arizona Fall League in 1994 and 1995, with league managers selecting him as the best second base prospect in 1995. Milliard began the 1996 season in Triple-A, batting .291 in 23 games.

Milliard debuted in the major leagues for the Marlins on 12 May 1996. He was the second player from Curaçao, after Hensley Meulens, to reach MLB and the eleventh Dutch player to do so. He drew a walk in his first plate appearance and got a bunt hit off Steve Trachsel in his first MLB start on 18 May. As a second baseman for the Marlins, Milliard played 32 games in two seasons. He received a World Series ring with the Marlins for the 1997 World Series win, though he did not play in the postseason. He played in eight games in May 1997, filling in for the injured Luis Castillo. Back in the minors, he underwent right elbow surgery later that month.

=== Later career ===
The Marlins traded Milliard and Al Leiter to the Mets for A. J. Burnett, Jesús Sánchez, and Ron Stratton in February 1998. That season, Milliard was a September call-up for the Mets, playing in 10 games at second base and shortstop for the Mets. In the minors, he had a career-high 15 home runs and a 51-game on-base streak, the longest in the minors that season.

In February 1999, New York traded him to the Reds for Mark Corey. He played in Double-A that year but was limited to 32 games due to a strained back and later a left thumb ligament strain. He then played in Triple-A in the San Diego Padres organization in 2000. In 2001, San Diego sold Milliard's contract to the Cleveland Indians. He failed to make the major league roster that year and returned to the Netherlands after five games in Triple-A.

Milliard played for HCAW in the Hoofdklasse from 2001 to 2008.

== International career ==
After playing for the junior national team, Milliard made his Netherlands national team debut in 1991. He played for the Dutch national team during the 2000 Summer Olympics in Sydney. In eight games, he batted .174 with one triple and one stolen base. He batted .217 in the 2002 Haarlem Baseball Week. He hit .188 in the 2002 Intercontinental Cup. During the 2004 Haarlem Baseball Week, he played in every game at second base and won the prize for the best defensive player. He had 10 putouts and 19 assists with no errors during the tournament. During the 2004 Olympics, he was awarded the prize for best second baseman. He played 75 games for the Netherlands. His last game was in August 2004 against Chinese Taipei during the Olympics. He hit .192 with one home run and three errors at shortstop the Olympics.

== Coaching career ==
In 2009, Milliard became coach of HCAW's Rookie team, the young players selection who were in the waiting room for the main squad. During winter, he was one of the instructors of the HCAW baseball winter academy for young players. In 2011, he left HCAW and succeeded Marcel Joost as one of the coaches for Hoofdklasse team Kinheim. In 2012, the team won the Holland Series weeks after Milliard and manager Eelco Jansen were fired. In 2014, he was head coach of Twins Oosterhout in the Dutch second division. In 2015, he returned to HCAW to lead the team as head coach for one season. In 2017, he was again head coach of the 16-to-21 year-old junior team of HCAW.
