= Peter Maestrales =

Greek businessman and baseball player (born 1979)

- Infielder
- Born: 4 July 1979 (age 46); Delray Beach, Florida, U. S.
- Bats: Switch Throws: Right
Medals
Men's baseball
Representing Greece
European Baseball Championship
Silver medal – second place	2003 Netherlands	National team

Peter Maestrales (born 4 July 1979) is CEO and founder of Airstream Jets, a Worldwide On-Demand Air Charter & Aircraft Management Company founded in 2008 with headquarters at (KBCT) Boca Raton Airport in Boca Raton, Florida.

Maestrales attended the University of Delaware (class of 2001), and is one of four UD Blue Hens to compete in the Olympics.

He is also a former professional baseball player, and a Greek baseball player who competed in the 2004 Summer Olympics.

His professional baseball career included time with the San Francisco Giants, Baltimore Orioles, Kansas City Royals, St. Louis Cardinals and San Diego Padres organizations. On June 8, 2005, the Orioles traded him to the Kansas City Royals for major-league catcher/outfielder Eli Marrero.
