= Nick Markakis =

American baseball player (born 1983)

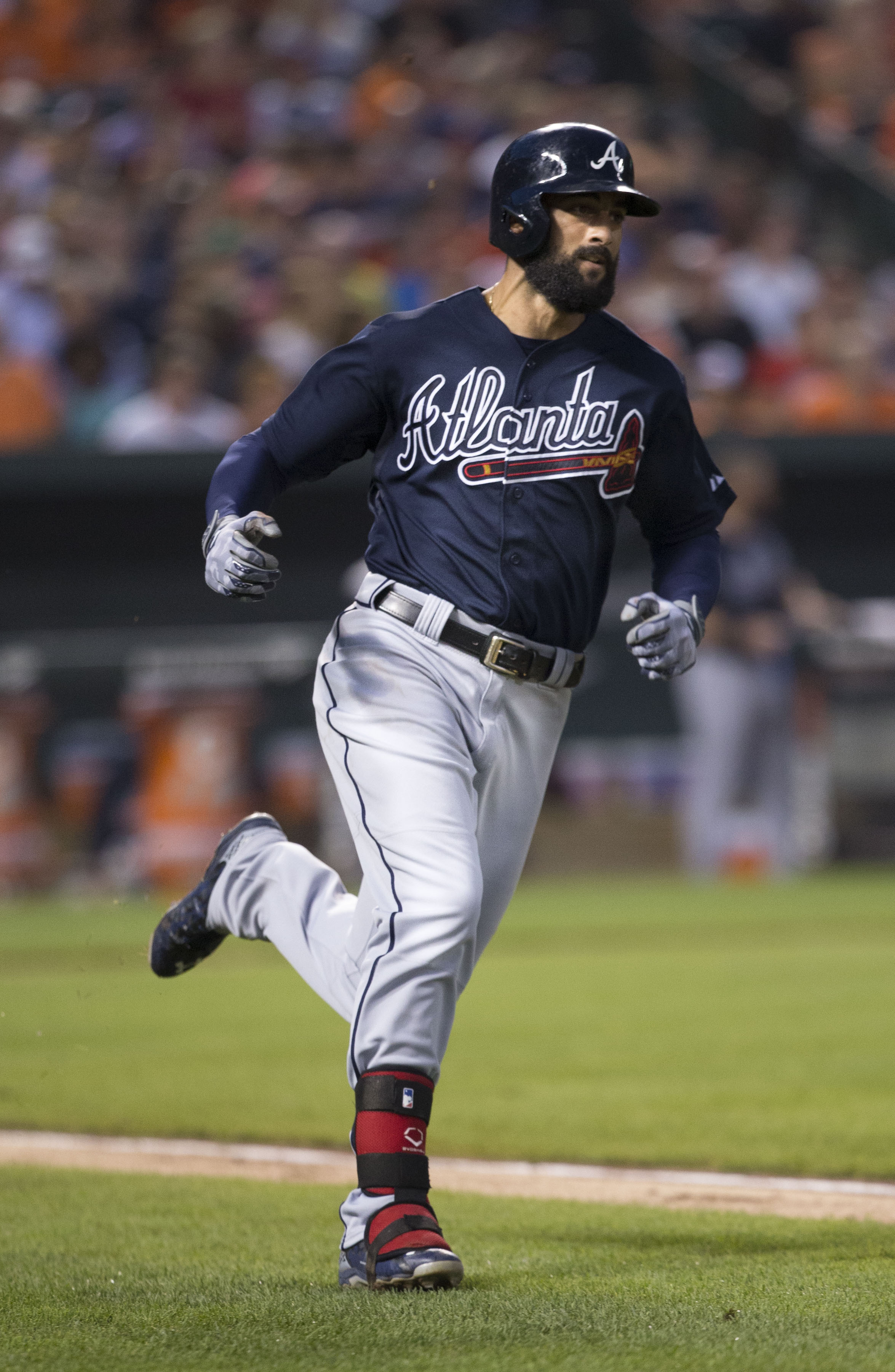
- Markakis with the Atlanta Braves in 2015
- Right fielder
- Born: November 17, 1983 (age 42); Glen Cove, New York, U.S.
- Batted: Left Threw: Left

MLB debut
- April 3, 2006, for the Baltimore Orioles

Last MLB appearance
- September 27, 2020, for the Atlanta Braves

Career statistics
- Batting average: .288
- Hits: 2,388
- Home runs: 189
- Runs batted in: 1,046
- Stats at Baseball Reference

Teams
- Baltimore Orioles (2006–2014); Atlanta Braves (2015–2020)

Career highlights and awards
- All-Star (2018); 3× Gold Glove Award (2011, 2014, 2018); Silver Slugger Award (2018); Baltimore Orioles Hall of Fame
Medals
Men's baseball
Representing Greece
European Baseball Championship
| Silver medal – second place | 2003 Netherlands | National team |

Nicholas William Markakis (/mɑːrˈkeɪkɪs/ mar-KAY-kis) (born November 17, 1983) is an American former professional baseball right fielder. He played in Major League Baseball (MLB) for 15 seasons for the Baltimore Orioles and Atlanta Braves. Markakis was the Orioles' first-round draft pick (seventh overall) in the 2003 Major League Baseball draft, and made his MLB debut in 2006. Markakis is a three-time Gold Glove Award winner, and he won a Silver Slugger Award and was named an MLB All-Star in 2018. Markakis previously held the MLB record for consecutive games by an outfielder without making an error (398). Markakis retired prior to the start of the 2021 season.

== Early life ==
Markakis was born in Glen Cove, New York, but moved to Woodstock, Georgia, when his family—which includes his parents, Dennis and Mary Lou, and his brothers Dennis, Greg, and Michael—relocated. He is of Greek and German descent.

== Collegiate and Olympic career ==
Markakis was originally drafted in the 35th round (1,056th overall) of the 2001 MLB draft by the Cincinnati Reds, from Woodstock High School in Woodstock, Georgia, but did not sign. Markakis instead attended Young Harris College, where he played college baseball for the Young Harris Mountain Lions baseball team. The Reds drafted him again in the 23rd round (675th overall) of the 2002 MLB draft, but he returned to Young Harris. Markakis played as both an outfielder and a pitcher, hitting .439 with 21 home runs and 92 runs batted in (RBIs), while also garnering a 12–0 win–loss record as a pitcher with one save and a 1.68 earned run average in 15 games. He was twice named Georgia Junior College Player of the Year, was awarded Baseball America's 2002 National JUCO Player of the Year and was named the American Baseball Coaches Association's 2003 NJCAA Division I Player of the Year.

In August 2003, Markakis played for the Greek national baseball team in the European National Championships, winning a silver medal with Team Greece. He also played for the Greek national baseball team in the 2004 Olympic Games in Athens, Greece.

== Professional career ==
=== Baltimore Orioles ===
==== Minor leagues ====
Markakis was drafted by the Orioles in the first round (seventh overall) of the 2003 Major League Baseball draft. Owning a fastball that was clocked as high as 96 miles per hour, Markakis was widely viewed as a pitching prospect, but the Orioles preferred his potential as a hitter.

Markakis spent his first professional season with the Single-A Aberdeen IronBirds in 2003, batting .283 with a home run and 28 RBI in 59 games. He played in 96 games with the Single-A Delmarva Shorebirds in 2004, where he hit .299 with 11 homers and led the team with 64 RBIs despite missing the last month of the season playing for Greece in the Olympics.

In 2005, Markakis started the year with the Single-A Frederick Keys and was named the top Orioles prospect by Baseball America. He won the Carolina/California League All-Star Game Home Run Derby, and followed that up by being named MVP of the All-Star game after hitting two homers. Markakis was promoted a short time later to the Double-A Bowie Baysox and was ultimately named to the Second Team in the 2005 Minor League All-Star Roster. He also received the Brooks Robinson Award as the organization's Minor League Player of the Year.

==== 2006 ====
Markakis began his first spring training with the Orioles in 2006 by reaching base in nine of his first ten plate appearances. He earned an Opening Day roster spot. Markakis made his major league debut on April 3, 2006, when he was used as a late-inning defensive replacement against the Tampa Bay Devil Rays. He received his first start and plate appearances two days later. Hitting second and playing left field, he drew three walks in his first three plate appearances and hit a 400-foot home run for his first major league hit in the 16–6 win.

On August 22, 2006, Markakis went 3-for-4 with three home runs in a 6–3 Orioles win at Camden Yards. Not only was it his first three-homer game, he became the 18th Oriole to do so and the first since 1999. The feat prompted a curtain call from the dugout, earning him a feat that The Washington Post called "an ovation that is rarely seen in these parts anymore. Curtain calls are for Yankee Stadium and Fenway Park, not Camden Yards."

Markakis finished his rookie season with a .291 average, 16 homers, 62 RBIs and two stolen bases in 147 games. On defense, he put up impressive stats in defensive ratings such as range factor and fielding percentage, ranking second among major league right fielders.

==== 2007 ====
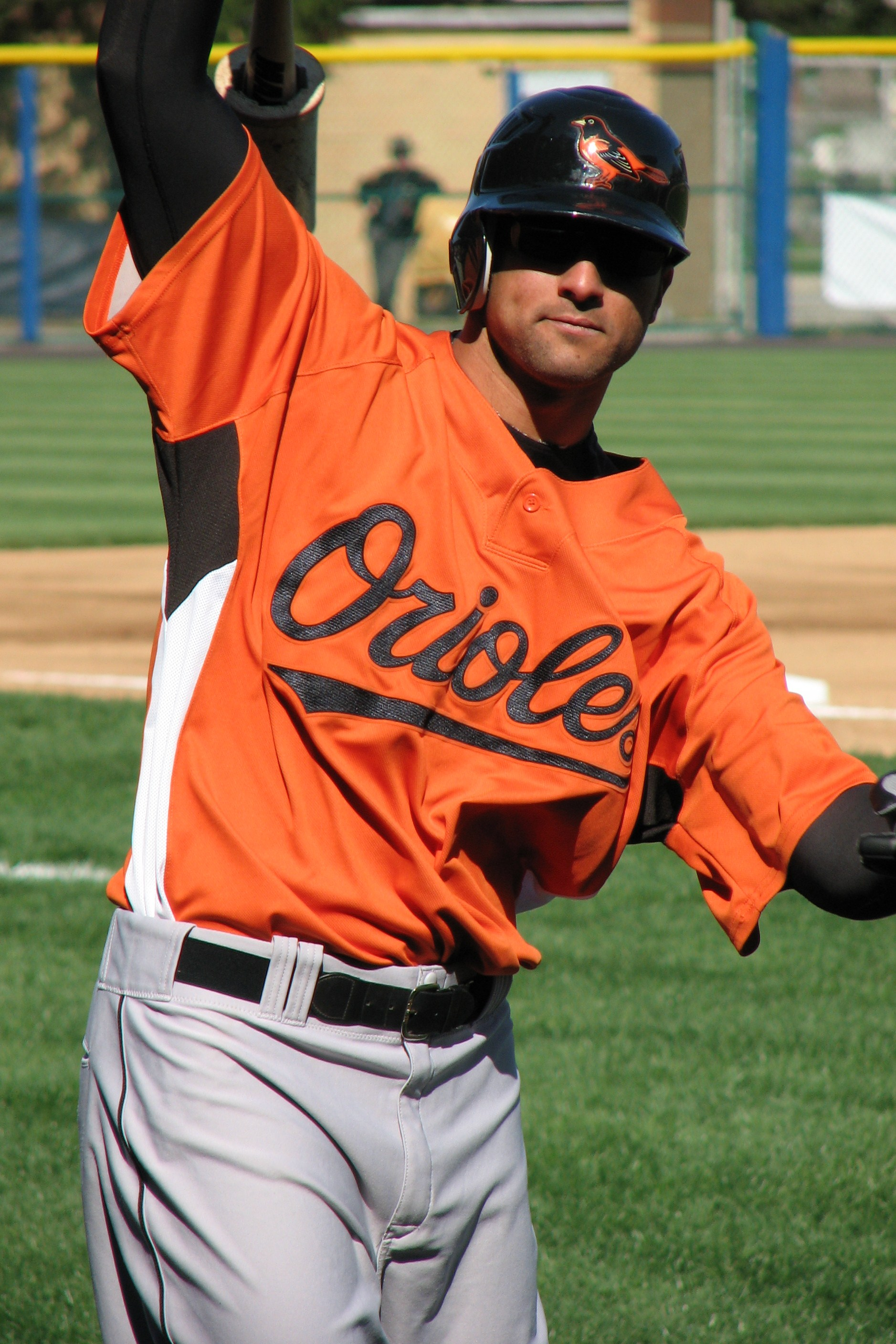
Markakis with the Baltimore Orioles in 2007 spring training

Markakis began the season as the starting right fielder. He finished the season with a .300 average, 23 home runs, 112 RBI and 18 stolen bases in 161 games. His home run and RBI totals ranked first on the team.

Markakis was third in the AL in games played (161), seventh in at-bats (637), sixth in doubles (43), seventh in hits (191), eighth in RBIs (112) and third in grounding into double plays (22).

Markakis also continued to play good defense as finished fifth in the league with 13 assists and sixth with a .994 fielding percentage. He was charged with just two errors in 318 total chances.

At the end of the season, Markakis could not agree to a contract extension with the Orioles and his contract was automatically renewed for another year at the baseline value of $455,000. He became eligible for arbitration after the 2008 season, and in the absence of a contract extension, would have become a free agent in 2011.

==== 2008–2010 ====
Markakis began the season as the team's #3 hitter and starting right fielder. He played well early in the year, but as the season went into the summer months, Orioles manager Dave Trembley opted to move him into the #2 hole, placing Melvin Mora behind him.

Markakis finished the season in the top 10 in the American League in batting average, OBP, OPS, games played, runs, hits, doubles, bases on balls, *OPS+, and RC (runs created). He also led the league in times on base. He raised his batting average to .306, slugged 20 home runs, hit 48 doubles (third in the major leagues), recorded 87 RBIs, scored 106 runs and stole 10 bases on the season in 157 games. He also had another stellar year in right field, notching 17 assists, which led the majors.

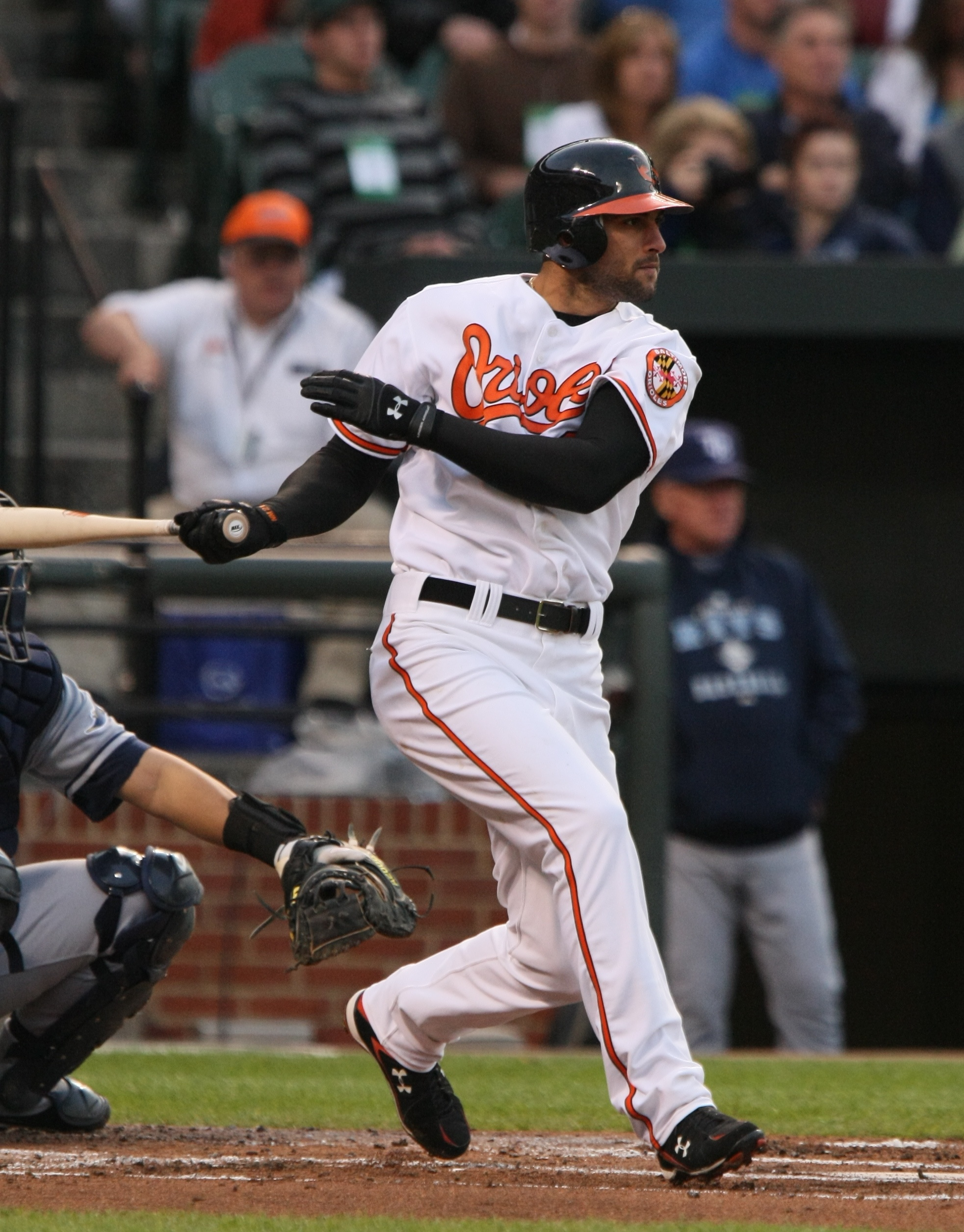
Markakis batting for the Baltimore Orioles in 2009

Markakis signed a six-year, $66.1 million extension through 2014 on January 22, 2009. Markakis was also honored with a commemorative shirt that season, called "Nick the Stick, Camden's Finest." He finished the 2009 season with a .293 average, 18 home runs, 45 doubles (seventh in the majors), 101 RBIs, 94 runs, and six stolen bases, in addition to being fourth in the majors with 14 outfield assists.

Markakis had a stellar 2010 season with the Orioles, finishing with a .297 average, recording 45 doubles (fifth in the majors), 12 home runs, 60 RBIs, 79 runs and seven stolen bases in 160 games.

==== 2011–2014 ====
Markakis got his 1,000th career hit against the Cleveland Indians on July 15, 2011. At the end of the season, he was awarded a Gold Glove.

After surgery to remove part of the hamate bone in his right wrist, Markakis was placed on the disabled list for the first time in his career on June 1, 2012. He began his minor league rehab games with the Double-A Bowie Baysox on July 7, and returned to the Orioles on July 13. On September 8, Markakis was hit by a pitch by Yankees pitcher CC Sabathia and suffered a fractured thumb. He then missed the rest of the season and postseason. He later said that he would have been ready to play had the Orioles made it to the World Series; the team was eliminated in five games by the New York Yankees in the American League Division Series.

During the 2013 campaign, Markakis was hampered by his wrist injury from the previous season. Markakis had a career low in batting average (.271) and home runs (10), along with 59 RBI which was also far below his 162-game average of 81. However, he continued to play stellar defense, committing no errors for a perfect 1.000 fielding percentage.

Coming off his worst offensive season, Markakis added 16 pounds of muscle in the offseason. April 26, Markakis got the start at first base against the Kansas City Royals due to an injury to teammate Chris Davis in the previous game. It was the first appearance at first base for Markakis since 2011. During the game, Markakis went 2-for-5 with two RBIs including a game winning walk-off single in the bottom of the 10th inning.

Through his first 102 games, Markakis had a .290 batting average with 34 runs batted in, 50 runs scored, and seven home runs, continuing his errorless streak. On August 3, 2014, Markakis collected his 1,500th career hit against Seattle Mariners pitcher Hisashi Iwakuma in the bottom of the third inning at Oriole Park at Camden Yards. In his previous at-bat, he collected his first career lead-off home run, a solo shot to right field to give the Orioles a 1–0 lead in the first inning.

=== Atlanta Braves ===
On December 3, 2014, Markakis agreed to a four-year $44 million contract with the Atlanta Braves.

==== 2015–2017 ====
On June 18, 2015, Markakis passed Darren Lewis for the record of most errorless games by an outfielder in a game against the Boston Red Sox. The streak later ended on June 25, 2015, during a game against the Washington Nationals at 398 games. On July 20, Markakis hit his first home run with the Braves against the Los Angeles Dodgers, given up by Brandon Beachy. He hit two more home runs over the course of the season for a career low total of three. His 181 total hits ranked fourth in the National League.

In 2016, he rebounded offensively from his first season with Atlanta despite hitting a career low .269. He hit 13 home runs and drove in 89 RBIs, his most since 2009. On October 2nd, he would be the last player to be issued a four-pitch intentional walk (as the following season a rule change was implemented to have the manager simply signal to the umpire to issue one), being issued one by Justin Verlander of the Detroit Tigers.

Markakis recorded his 2,000th career hit against the Los Angeles Dodgers on August 3, 2017. He finished the season with a .275 batting average, 76 RBIs, 163 hits, and eight home runs in 160 games.

==== 2018 ====
Markakis scored his 1,000th career run on June 1, 2018, against the Washington Nationals. Batting .322 with 10 home runs and 59 RBIs, he was named a starting outfielder for the 2018 MLB All-Star Game. He set new records for the most career hits (2,172) and most games played (1,933) by a player making his debut as an All-Star.

Markakis, following another impressive defensive season in right field, earned his third Gold Glove award in 2018. In addition to the Gold Glove, Markakis also won his first career Silver Slugger as an outfielder after finishing the season with a .297 batting average, 185 hits, 14 home runs, and 93 RBIs in 162 games, all highs while a member of the Braves. He was also durable, having appeared in all 162 games for the first time in his career, while also leading the league in games played.

==== 2019 ====
After the 2018 season, Markakis signed a one-year contract with the Braves for the 2019 season worth $4 million, with a $6 million club option for 2020, and a $2 million buyout in case the Braves decline the option. On July 26, 2019, Markakis was struck by a pitch from Philadelphia Phillies pitcher Cole Irvin, and left the game. Prior to his placement on the 10-day injured list, Markakis had played in every game of the 2019 season to that point. He returned to the active roster on September 13. In 2019, Markakis batted .285/.356/.420 with nine home runs and 62 RBI in 116 games.

The Braves' declined Markakis' contract option in November 2019, instead agreeing to a one-year contract for the 2020 season, worth $4 million.

==== 2020 ====
Following a discussion with teammate Freddie Freeman, who was diagnosed with COVID-19 before the 2020 season began, Markakis initially decided to opt out of the 2020 season. On July 29, however, Markakis announced that he planned to rejoin the Braves. He was added to the team's active roster on August 5. Markakis was placed on the injured list on August 18, due to potential exposure to COVID-19 while not with the team. He was reactivated on August 25. In 2020, Markakis batted .254 (a career low)/.312/.392 with 15 runs, one home run, and 15 RBI in 130 at-bats.

On March 12, 2021, prior to the start of the 2021 season, Markakis announced his retirement after 15 years in MLB.

== Career statistics ==
| Years | G | AB | R | H | 2B | 3B | HR | RBI | BB | AVG | OBP | SLG | OPS | FLG% |
|---|---|---|---|---|---|---|---|---|---|---|---|---|---|---|
| 15 | 2.154 | 8,302 | 1,119 | 2,388 | 514 | 22 | 189 | 1,046 | 891 | .288 | .357 | .423 | .781 | **.994** |

Note: All-time MLB leader in category is noted in bold.

As of the end of the 2026 MLB season, Markakis is the all-time leader in fielding percentage as a right fielder, at .9938 (.994).

== Personal life ==
Growing up, Markakis was a Boston Red Sox fan. He wore #21 while with the Orioles in honor of Roger Clemens, but changed to #22 upon joining the Braves, as #21 is retired for Warren Spahn. Coincidentally, #22 was the number of right fielder Jason Heyward, who was traded from the Braves to the St. Louis Cardinals before the 2015 season, and replaced by Markakis.

Markakis married Christina Dutko in 2008. He became the brother-in-law of Ryan Flaherty when the latter married Christina's sister Ashley in 2016. Markakis and his wife have three sons.

The couple live year-round in Monkton, Maryland, where Markakis purchased a home during the 2008 season. He also owns a house in Waynesville, North Carolina.

=== Charity work ===
His outreach activities involve 'Going to Bat Against Breast Cancer', Prostate Cancer Foundation, and the Home Run Challenge. Nick was also nominated for the Roberto Clemente Award on September 2, 2009.

==== Right Side Foundation ====
The Right Side Foundation was started by Markakis and his wife Christina on May 28, 2009. The foundation was created to help distressed children, whether they are disadvantaged, sick, lonely, or grieving, throughout Maryland. “Christina and I have adopted Maryland as our new home and believe that establishing our Foundation is the most effective way to formalize our charitable efforts and have the greatest impact on children in Maryland,” stated Nick.

The Markakis explained that their love of children, and the birth of their son, Taylor, helped decide that the foundation would be based on helping children because they feel that every child deserves to enjoy promise and innocence. “Nick and I have always loved children. As new parents, we see great promise in our son and want to do our part to ensure that other children in Maryland have opportunities to grow and enjoy life," Christina explained. The Markakis family suspended their charity in 2013 and continued philanthropic efforts through another charity, the Casey Cares Foundation.

== See also ==
- List of Major League Baseball career hits leaders
- List of Major League Baseball career runs scored leaders
