= Greece national baseball team =

Information
- Country: Greece
- Federation: Hellenic Baseball and Softball Federation
- Confederation: WBSC Europe
- Manager: Chris Demetral

WBSC ranking
- Current: 50 (26 March 2026)
- Highest: 32 (December 2014)

Olympic Games
- Appearances: 1 (first in 2004)
- Best result: 7th

World Cup
- Appearances: 1 (first in 2011)
- Best result: 16th

European Championship
- Appearances: 6 (first in 2003)
- Best result: (silver) 2nd (1 time, in 2003)

The Greece national baseball team also known as "Hellas", represents Greece in international baseball play. The team are a member of the World Baseball Softball Confederation (WBSC) and WBSC Europe. The team is managed by Chris Demetral and it is currently ranked 50th in the world by the WBSC.

== History ==
The first time that Greece put together a national team that got any recognition in the baseball world was ahead of the 2004 Athens Summer Olympics. Greece, as the host country, was faced with the dilemma that the actual baseball talent pool in the country was very small, and what players were available were amateur. However, as a result of lenient citizenship laws, various minor leaguers from the United States were able to play for the Greeks. Among the better known players were Baltimore Orioles prospect Nick Markakis, former major leaguer Clay Bellinger, and various other players of Greek descent.

Greece made its international debut at the 2003 European Championship qualification, contested in Hungary. The team finished the tournament undefeated and qualified for the 2003 European Championship in the Netherlands. Surprisingly, Greece finished as runners-up in the tournament, losing the final to the host Netherlands team. Second baseman Chris Demetral and outfielder Cory Harris were included in the tournament's All-Star Team, while Peter Maestrales finished the championship as the leader in both stolen bases and runs scored.

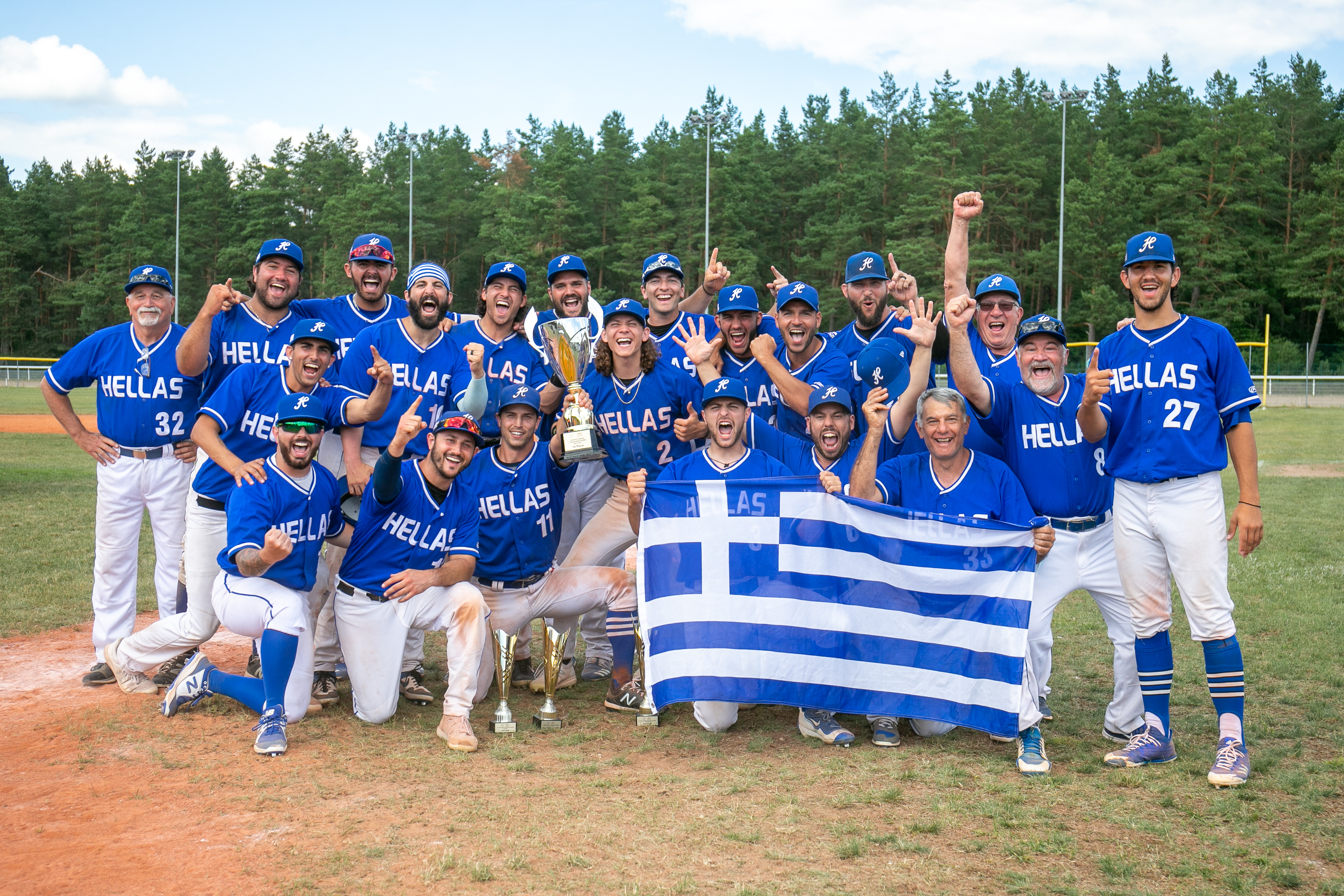
The Greek team at the 2021 WBSC Europe Lithuania Qualifier

At the 2004 Summer Olympics, the Greek national team, led by American college baseball coach Dusty Rhodes finished the tournament in 7th-place, with a single win against Italy.

As runners-up of the 2003 European championship, Greece qualified for the 2005 Baseball World Cup. However, the Greek government curtailed all funding to the Hellenic Baseball and Softball Federation, so the team did not participate, with the Czech Republic taking their place.

== International tournament results ==
=== Olympic Games ===
Summer Olympics record							Qualification record			
Year	Round	Position	W	L	RS	RA	W	L	RS	RA
(Greece) 2004	Preliminary round	7th	1	6	24	49	Qualified as hosts			
(China) 2008	Did not qualify						Did not participate			
(Japan) 2020	Did not qualify						Did not participate			
Total	1/3	–	1	6	24	49	–	–	–	–

=== European Baseball Championship ===
Year	Position
Netherlands 2003	(silver) 2nd
Czech Republic 2005	9th
Germany 2010	4th
Netherlands 2012	7th
Czech Republic, Germany 2014	10th
Netherlands 2016	11th
Italy 2021	14th
Czech Republic 2023	13th
Netherlands, Italy, Belgium 2025	13th
Average Finish	9th

=== Baseball World Cup ===
Year	Position
Panama 2011	16th
Average Finish	16th

== Current roster ==
Greece roster – 2023 European Baseball Championship
Players		Coaching staff
Pitchers: 21 Daniel Gosselin; 11 Max Gouoren; 38 Jonathan Kountis; 27 Dimitrios Kourtis; 33 Dimitri Lettas; 3 Yanni Orfanidis; 7 Pete Sykaras	Catchers: 20 Erik Pappas; 1 Antonio Torres; Infielders: 24 Peter Dudunakis; 10 Achilleas Karaiskos; 23 Billy Les; 5 Peter Maestrales; 13 Tom Roulis; 25 Ari Sechopoulos; Outfielders: 29 Kasey Caras; 9 Paul Neophytou; 6 Nick Spiliotis; 26 Loukas Soukeras; 2 Alejandro Torres	Manager: 4 Chris Demetral; Coaches: 18 Scott Demetral (bench); 32 Demetre Kokoris (pitching); 34 Mike Tonis (coach); 28 Noah Zavolas (coach); Roster
