= Harvey Monte =

Curaçaoan baseball player (born 1981)

- Outfielder
- Born: 8 October 1981 (age 45); Willemstad, Curaçao
- Bats: Left Throws: Left
Medals
Men's baseball
Representing Netherlands
European Baseball Championship
Gold medal – first place	2003 Netherlands	National team
Gold medal – first place	2005 Czech Republic	National team
Gold medal – first place	2007 Spain	National team

Harvey David Simeon Perigeault Monte (born 8 October 1981) is a Curaçaoan former professional baseball player.

Monte represented the Netherlands at the 2004 Summer Olympics in Athens where he and his team finished sixth. He was 0-for-1 with a walk, playing only 2 innings of defense in the tournament.

In 1999, Monte won the Ron Fraser Award, given to the most promising Dutch youth player. In 2001, he won the Guus van der Heijden Memorial Trophy, as the country's best under-23 player. He first played for the Dutch national team that year, winning the best rookie award at the World Port Tournament. He was named the best right fielder of the 2005 European Championship. He won three European championships with the Netherlands. He also played in the 2006 World Baseball Classic. He played for several seasons in the Honkbal Hoofdklasse, the top Dutch league, winning titles with Neptunus. He also played for ADO and Sparta-Feyenoord.

Monte also briefly played baseball in the United States early in his career. After graduating high school in the Netherlands in 1999, he attended Central Arizona College, batting .399 for the Vaqueros baseball team in 2001. He signed as a free agent with the Seattle Mariners that December and played one season of minor league baseball, batting a combined .155 in 41 games split between the Everett AquaSox and Wisconsin Timber Rattlers.
