= 2003 European Baseball Championship – Qualification =

Qualification for 2003 European Baseball Championship
Tournament details
- Countries: Sweden; Hungary
- Dates: 29 July – 4 August 2002
- Teams: 17

The qualification for the 2003 European Baseball Championship was held from 29 July to 4 August 2002 in Alby, Sweden and Nagykovácsi, Hungary. Seventeen nations, divided into two pools, competed for two spots in the final tournament in the Netherlands.

The tournament marked the debut of the Greece national team in international competitions. The Greek team, that was also preparing for its participation in the 2004 Summer Olympics, won the Nagykovácsi Pool, securing its place in the final championship. Sweden won the Alby Pool, also qualifying for the tournament.

== Pool A ==
All Pool A matches were played in Alby, Sweden.

=== Group 1 ===
Pos	Team	Pld	W	L	RF	RA	RD	PCT	GB	Qualification	SWE	POL	DEN	NOR
1	Sweden (H)	3	3	0	46	4	+42	1.000	—	Advance to Semifinals	—	14–0	16–1	16–3
2	Poland	3	2	1	17	27	−10	.667	1	Advance to Semifinals	0–14	—	9–6	8–7
3	Denmark	3	1	2	11	28	−17	.333	2		1–16	6–9	—	4–3
4	Norway	3	0	3	13	28	−15	.000	3		3–16	7–8	3–4	—

Source: European Baseball Confederation
(H) Hosts

=== Group 2 ===
Pos	Team	Pld	W	L	RF	RA	RD	PCT	GB	Qualification	AUT	IRL	LTU	FIN
1	Austria	3	3	0	25	17	+8	1.000	—	Advance to Semifinals	—	8–4	9–6	8–7
2	Ireland	3	2	1	22	24	−2	.667	1	Advance to Semifinals	4–8	—	8–7	10–9
3	Lithuania	3	1	2	35	19	+16	.333	2		6–9	7–8	—	22–2
4	Finland	3	0	3	18	40	−22	.000	3		7–8	9–10	2–22	—

Source: European Baseball Confederation

=== Knockout stage ===
Semi-finals
Sweden	18
Ireland	1
Austria	8
Poland	2

Final
Sweden	13
Austria	2
Third place
Ireland	5
Poland	7

Sweden qualified for the 2003 European Baseball Championship as winner of the Alby Pool.

== Pool B ==
All Pool B matches were played in Nagykovácsi, Hungary.

=== Group 1 ===
Pos	Team	Pld	W	L	RF	RA	RD	PCT	GB	Qualification	UKR	BLR	SLO	YUG
1	Ukraine	3	3	0	29	0	+29	1.000	—	Advance to Semifinals	—	5–0	12–0	12–0
2	Belarus	3	2	1	23	21	+2	.667	1	Advance to Semifinals	0–5	—	13–8	10–8
3	Slovenia	3	1	2	22	32	−10	.333	2		0–12	8–13	—	14–7
4	Yugoslavia	3	0	3	15	36	−21	.000	3		0–12	8–10	7–14	—

Source: European Baseball Confederation

=== Group 2 ===
Pos	Team	Pld	W	L	RF	RA	RD	PCT	GB	Qualification	GRE	SVK	HUN	BUL	ROM
1	Greece	4	4	0	85	8	+77	1.000	—	Advance to Semifinals	—	16–3	20–1	23–0	26–4
2	Slovakia	4	2	2	28	23	+5	.500	2	Advance to Semifinals	3–16	—	12–5	11–1	2–11
3	Hungary (H)	4	2	2	26	39	−13	.500	2		1–20	5–12	—	11–0	9–7
4	Bulgaria	4	1	3	10	49	−39	.250	3		0–23	1–11	0–11	—	9–4
5	Romania	4	1	3	26	46	−20	.250	3		4–26	11–2	7–9	4–9	—

Source: European Baseball Confederation
(H) Hosts

=== Knockout stage ===
Semi-finals
Ukraine	7
Slovakia	11
Greece	15
Belarus	0

Final
Slovakia	0
Greece	21
Third place
Ukraine	20
Belarus	6

Greece qualified for the 2003 European Baseball Championship as winner of the Nagykovácsi Pool.
