= Cory Harris =

Greek-American baseball player (born 1979)

- Outfielder
- Born: 7 December 1979 (age 46); Davenport, Iowa, U. S.
- Bats: Right Throws: Right
Medals
Men's baseball
Representing Greece
European Baseball Championship
Silver medal – second place	2003 Netherlands	National team

Cory Antony Harris (born 7 December 1979) is a Greek-American baseball player who competed for Greece in the 2004 Summer Olympics.

Harris was named to the All-Star team of the 2003 European Baseball Championship as Greece finished in second.

Harris attended Pensacola State College in Pensacola, Florida. The New York Mets drafted him in the 40th round of the 1999 Major League Baseball draft. He played in the minor leagues through 2004, joining the Baltimore Orioles system after the 2004 Olympics. He then played in independent leagues in the U.S. and Mexico through 2008.
