= Seth La Fera =

Italian American baseball player (born 1975)

- Born: 28 September 1975 (age 49)
- Bats: Right Throws: Right

Seth David La Fera (born 28 September 1975) is an Italian American former baseball player who competed in the 2000 Summer Olympics and 2004 Summer Olympics. He also played for Italy in several European Championships.

LaFera played high school baseball for Sprayberry High School in Marietta, Georgia, where he was teammates with future Major League Baseball players Kris Benson and Marlon Byrd. He then played college baseball for the Kennesaw State Owls.

He also played club baseball in Europe for Parma, Rimini, and San Marino in the Italian Baseball League and Neptunus in the Dutch Honkbal Hoofdklasse.
