= Eelco Jansen =

Dutch baseball player (born 1969)

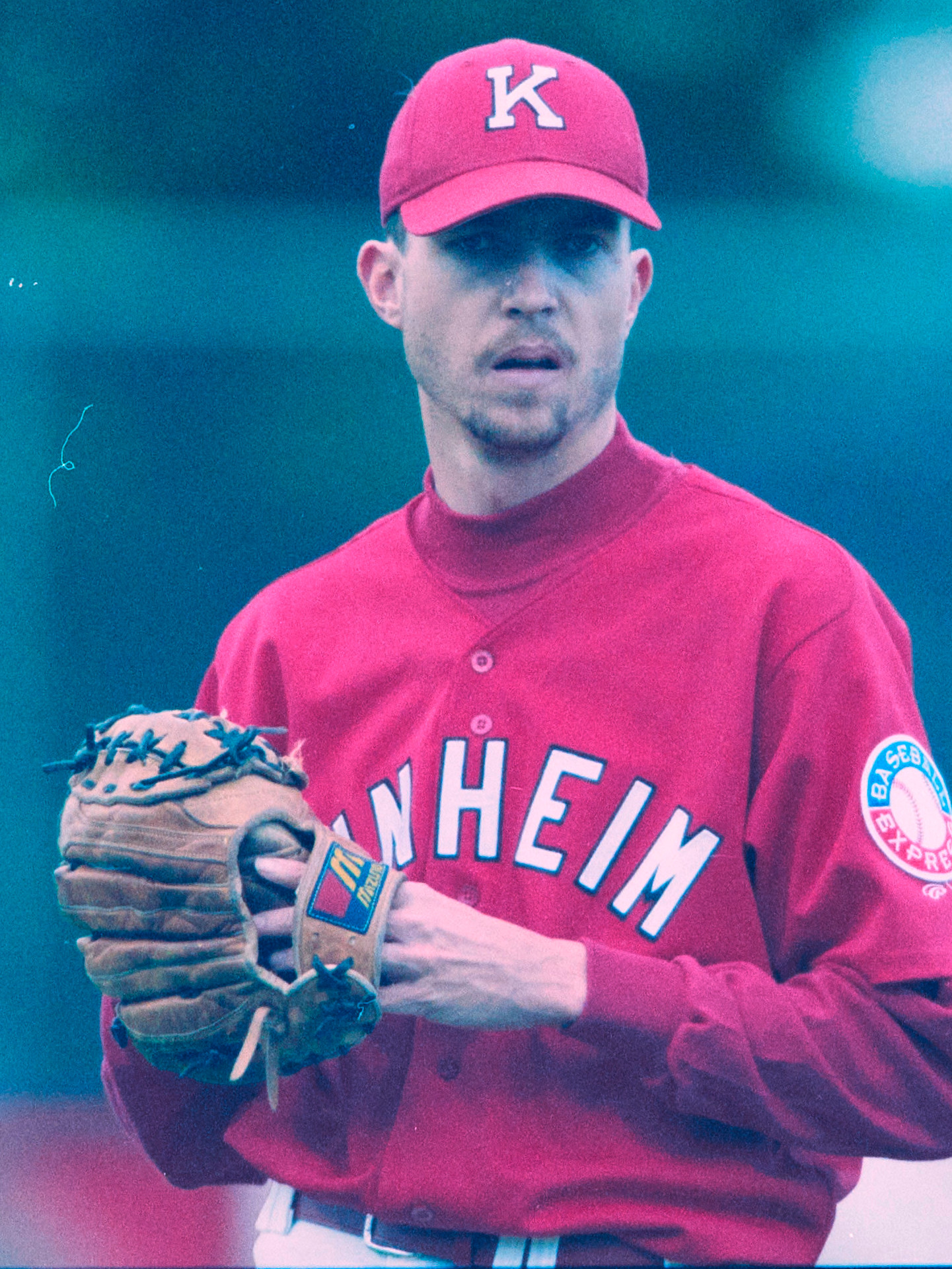
- Jansen with Kinheim in 1999
- Pitcher
- Born: 14 May 1969 (age 57); Heemskerk, North Holland, Netherlands
- Bats: Right Throws: Right
Medals
Men's baseball
Representing Netherlands
European Baseball Championship
Gold medal – first place	2003 Netherlands	National team

Eelco Jansen (born 14 May 1969) is a Dutch former baseball player. He pitched for the Netherlands national team in the three Summer Olympics and other international tournaments. He is the second pitcher in the history of the Dutch Honkbal Hoofdklasse to throw a perfect game, achieving that feat in 1997.

== Playing career ==
In 1993, Jansen made his debut with the Dutch national team and in the Hoofdklasse with Haarlem Nicols. He moved to Haarlem rival Kinheim in 1994. He was the winning pitcher for the final game of the 1994 Holland Series. With the national team, he was named the best pitcher at the 1995 World Port Tournament in Rotterdam, then was named the best Hoofdklasse pitcher in 1995. After that season, he dealt with a back injury.

Jansen pitched in three consecutive Olympics for the Netherlands. At the 1996 Summer Olympics in Atlanta, the Dutch team finished fifth. He had a disastrous outing against Japan, allowing six runs in 1/3 of an inning in a mercy rule loss. Four years later at the 2000 Summer Olympics in Sydney, the Dutch finished fifth again. Jansen allowed one run in three innings pitched over two games. In Athens at the 2004 Summer Olympics, they finished in sixth place. Jansen had an 0–1 record and 7.50 earned run average, pitching six innings over three games.

Jansen threw a perfect game against ADO on June 27, 1997. He also threw two no-hitters in his career. With the national team, he held Sweden hitless in a seven-inning game in the 2003 European Baseball Championship. He also threw a no-hitter for Neptunus against ADO in the Hoofdklasse on June 9, 2002. He joined Neptunus for the 2002 season and was again named the Hoofdklasse's best pitcher in 2004, after which he retired.

While a manager in the Hoofdklasse, Jansen pitched for second-division Belgian club Antwerp Eagles in 2011, helping the club win a promotion to the First Division.

During his playing career, Jansen was nicknamed "Psycho" for his behavior on the pitching mound.

== Coaching career ==
Jansen became a coach after ending his pitching career, first with the Amsterdam Pirates following the 2004 season. He then rejoined Kinheim for the 2007 season, becoming the team's manager after the 2008 season. He was replaced during the 2012 playoffs, later celebrating when the team won the Holland Series.
