= Giovanni Pantaleoni =

Italian baseball player (born 1978)

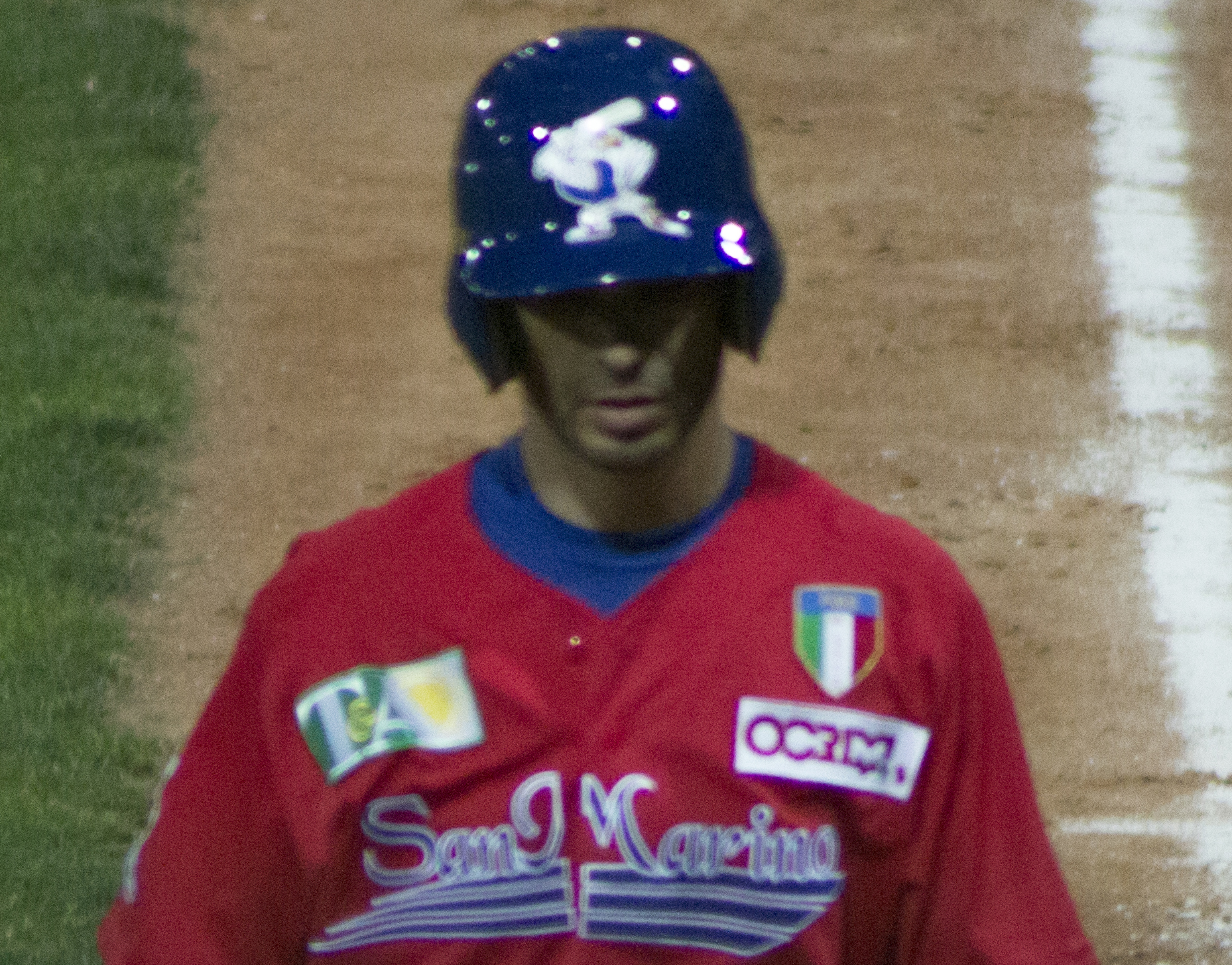
- Pantaleoni in 2013
- Born: 16 March 1978 (age 47); Cupramontana, Italy
- Bats: Right Throws: Right

Giovanni Pantaleoni (born 16 March 1978) is an Italian baseball player who competed in the 2004 Summer Olympics. Pantaleoni was born in Cupramontana, Italy.

As a member of the Italian national baseball team, he won the 2012 European Baseball Championship.
