= Patrick Beljaards =

Dutch baseball player (born 1978)

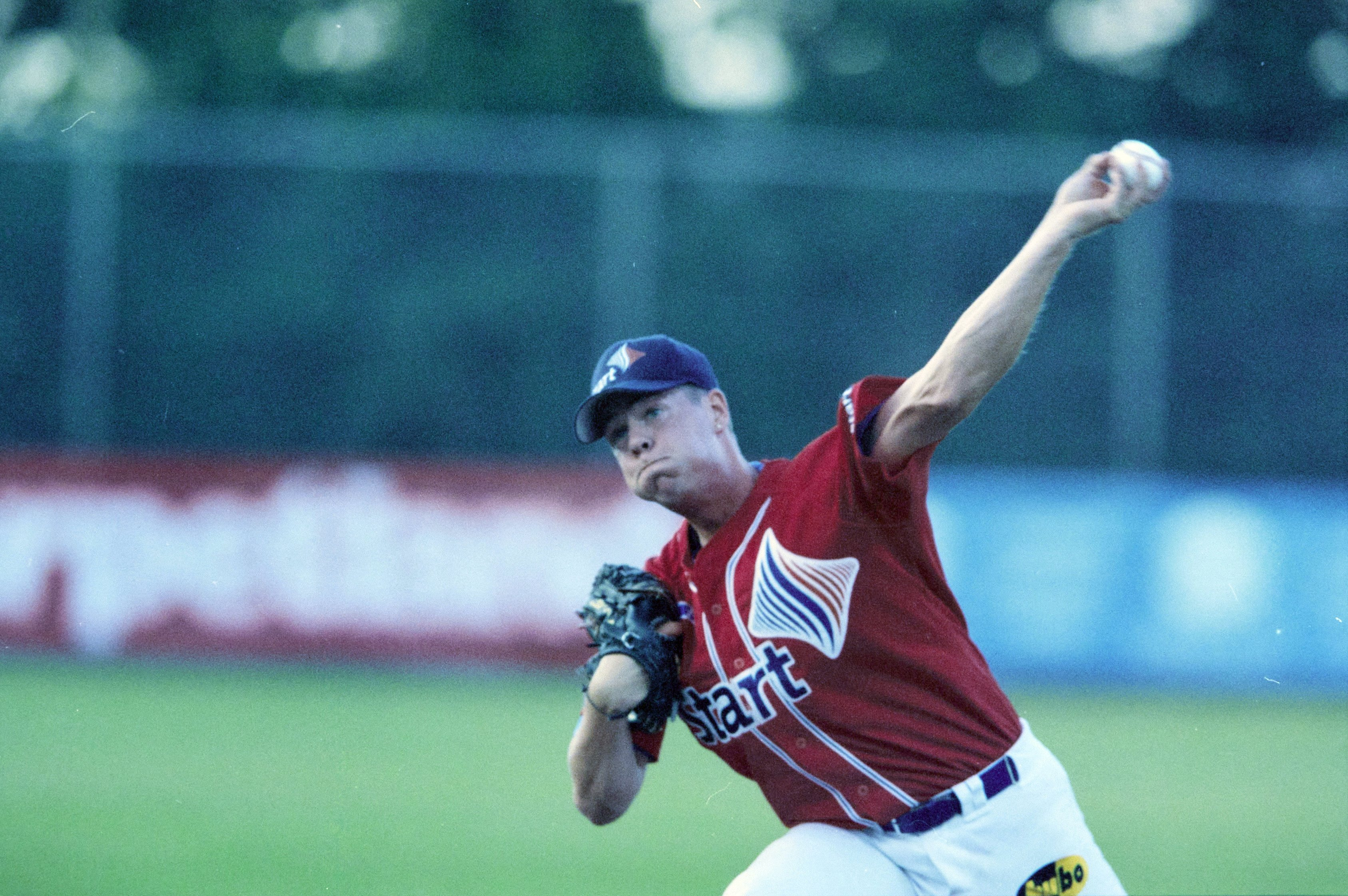
- Beljaards in 2000
- Pitcher
- Born: March 4, 1978 (age 48); Haarlem, The Netherlands
- Bats: Left Throws: Left
Medals
Men's baseball
Representing Netherlands
European Baseball Championship
Silver medal – second place	1997 France	National team
Gold medal – first place	1999 Italy	National team
Gold medal – first place	2001 Germany	National team
Gold medal – first place	2003 Netherlands	National team
Gold medal – first place	2005 Czech Republic	National team

Patrick Beljaards (born 4 March 1978 in Haarlem, North Holland) is a Dutch former baseball player.

Beljaards pitched for Netherlands at the 2000 Summer Olympics in Sydney, where the team finished in fifth place. He pitched in relief in the team's upset victory over Cuba. At the 2004 Summer Olympics in Athens, the team placed sixth. He also pitched for the Netherlands in several international competitions, including the European Baseball Championship, Intercontinental Cup, Baseball World Cup, Haarlem Baseball Week, and World Port Tournament.

Beljaards played for Kinheim in the Honkbal Hoofdklasse, the top Dutch baseball league, from 1996 to 2011. He was primarily a starter with Kinheim but finished his career as a relief pitcher. Kinheim later retired Beljaards' uniform number, 16.

Beljaards coached RCH-Pinguïns starting in 2013.
