= Croatia national baseball team =

Information
- Country: Croatia
- Federation: Croatian Baseball Association
- Confederation: Confederation of European Baseball National Teams Director = Denis Polašek

WBSC ranking
- Current: 32 (26 March 2026)

Uniforms
Home	Away

The Croatia national baseball team is the national baseball team of Croatia. As of the beginning of 2013 in the IBAF World Rankings, they were the seventh-best team in Europe and the 31st men's baseball team overall. The team is controlled by the Croatian Baseball Association, which is represented in the Confederation of European Baseball. Croatia hosted one of the four pools during the first stage of play in the 2009 Baseball World Cup. The official IBAF 2014 end-of-year World Rankings put Croatia 43rd in the world. Croatia joined the Confederation of European Baseball in 1992.

In 2015, Croatia won the B-Level European Championship in Karlovac. They were undefeated in their pool, winning all five games. In the championship game, Croatia defeated Slovakia 6–4 to win the Qualifier for the 2016 European Baseball Championship. Croatia finished in 12th place in the 2014 Euros and were relegated to the B-Level. Croatia competed in the 2019 European Baseball Championship, came in 11th out of 12 teams (beating only Team Sweden), but haven't been relegated because of enlargement of championship to 16 teams. The best result ever Croatia managed on 2021 European Baseball Championship where the 7th place was won in match against Belgium.

Osvaldo Vavra is the President of the Croatian Baseball Association. Božidar Rožman is the Vice President, and Zdenko Ostović is the Secretary General. Kristina Uroić is the executive director of the CBA, which is headquartered in the capital city, Zagreb.

== 2021 roster ==
The following was the Croatian roster that participated in the 2021 European Championship held in Italy.

Player	No.	Pos.	YOB
Hrvoje Tadić	1	3B	1995
Nino Kruheh	2	C	1997
Rene Sebastian Bodalec	3	C/OF	2001
Karlo Kos	4	P/IF	1998
Andrija Tomić	5	C/OF	1996
Slobodan Gales	6	OF	1988
Jose Herrera	7	SS	1993
Borna Strelec	8	P/IF	2001
Petar Juričić	9	P/IF	2002
Marin Tadić	10	P	1990
Antonio Horvatic	11	P/IF	1997
Pavao Karin	12	P/OF	1990
Ronald Anthony Krsolovic	13	P/3B	1996
Mario Manojlov	14	1B/OF	1984
Andrew Jones	15	IF	1989
Jose Dias	16	P	1993
Benjamin Paulić	17	IF	2003
Philip Smith	19	C/1B	1990
Kruno Gojković	20	P/OF	1995
Petar Jure Rumora	21	1B/OF	1996
James Summers	23	P	1973

The manager of the team are Jake Summers, and the assistant coaches are Michel Ćurić, Damir Karin, Ken Krsolovic and Josip Bozanić.

== Tournament results ==
Baseball World Cup

- 2009 : 18th

=== European Baseball Championship ===
Year	Position	Pld	W	L
1997	Did not Qualify			
1999	11th	7	2	5
2001	8th	8	2	6
2003	10th	8	4	4
2005	12th	10	1	9
2007	8th	5	1	4
2010	11th	5	1	4
2012	10th	6	1	5
2014	12th	7	2	5
2016	10th	7	2	5
2019	11th	8	1	7
2021	7th	6	3	3
2023	10th	6	3	3
2025	8th	7	4	3
Total	13/38	90	26	63
