= 2010 European Baseball Championship =

Tournament details
- Country: Germany
- Dates: July 23 – August 1, 2010
- Teams: 12
- Defending champions: Netherlands

Final positions
- Champions: Italy (9th title)
- Runners-up: Netherlands
- Third place: Germany
- Fourth place: Greece

Tournament statistics
- Games played: 41
- Attendance: 22,243 (543 per game)
- Best BA: (Italy) Jiminez Chapelli (.684)
- Most HRs: (Italy) Giuseppe Mazzanti (4)
- Most SBs: (Italy) (Italy) Jiminez Chapelli (3 out 4)
- Most Ks (as pitcher): (Germany) Martin Dewald (14)

Awards
- MVP: (Italy) Giuseppe Mazzanti

The 2010 European Baseball Championship was an international baseball competition held in Germany from July 23 to August 1, 2010. The tournament was originally set to be held in 2009 with Russia as host. In March 2008, the Confederation of European Baseball awarded the tournament to the German Baseball and Softball Federation. The tournament was moved back one year to not be held in the same year as the Baseball World Cup. The event was hosted by the cities of Stuttgart, Heidenheim an der Brenz, and Neuenburg am Rhein in the southwest of Germany.

== Qualification ==
The following 12 teams qualified for the tournament.

Pool A		Pool B	
Belgium	Winner of Antwerp Pool	Croatia	Winner of Karlovac Pool
Czech Republic	Winner of Prague Pool	Great Britain	2007 European Baseball Championship
France	5th, 2007 European Baseball Championship	Greece	Winner of Abrantes Pool
Germany	4th, 2007 European Baseball Championship	Italy	7th, 2007 European Baseball Championship
Netherlands	2007 European Baseball Championship	Spain	2007 European Baseball Championship
Ukraine	Winner of Trnava Pool	Sweden	6th, 2007 European Baseball Championship

== Round 1 ==
=== Pool A ===
==== Standings ====
Qualified for Pool C
Did not qualify for Pool C

Teams	W	L	Pct.	GB	R	RA
Netherlands	5	0	1.000	–	42	3
Germany	4	1	.800	1	34	18
France	3	2	.600	2	33	25
Czech Republic	2	3	.400	3	25	21
Belgium	1	4	.200	4	16	36
Ukraine	0	5	.000	5	5	52

All times are local (UTC+2)

==== Schedule ====
July 23, 2010; 19:00	Ukraine	0 – 10 (F/8)	Germany	Stuttgart Ballpark, Stuttgart; Attendance: 700
July 23, 2010; 19:00		Boxscore		Stuttgart Ballpark, Stuttgart; Attendance: 700

July 24, 2010; 13:00	Belgium	9 – 0	Ukraine	Heideköpfe Ballpark, Heidenheim; Attendance: 50
July 24, 2010; 13:00		Boxscore		Heideköpfe Ballpark, Heidenheim; Attendance: 50

July 24, 2010; 16:00	Netherlands	10 – 0 (F/7)	France	Atomics Ballpark, Neuenburg; Attendance: 611
July 24, 2010; 16:00		Boxscore		Atomics Ballpark, Neuenburg; Attendance: 611

July 24, 2010; 19:00	Germany	6 – 2	Czech Republic	Stuttgart Ballpark, Stuttgart; Attendance: 1,650
July 24, 2010; 19:00		Boxscore		Stuttgart Ballpark, Stuttgart; Attendance: 1,650

July 25, 2010; 14:30	Germany	8 – 4	Belgium	Stuttgart Ballpark, Stuttgart; Attendance: 2,540
July 25, 2010; 14:30		Boxscore		Stuttgart Ballpark, Stuttgart; Attendance: 2,540

July 25, 2010; 15:00	France	6 – 1	Czech Republic	Atomics Ballpark, Neuenburg; Attendance: 630
July 25, 2010; 15:00		Boxscore		Atomics Ballpark, Neuenburg; Attendance: 630

July 25, 2010; 18:00	Netherlands	12 – 2 (F/7)	Ukraine	Heideköpfe Ballpark, Heidenheim; Attendance: 180
July 25, 2010; 18:00		Boxscore		Heideköpfe Ballpark, Heidenheim; Attendance: 180

July 26, 2010; 10:30	Czech Republic	1 – 7	Netherlands	Heideköpfe Ballpark, Heidenheim; Attendance: 40
July 26, 2010; 10:30		Boxscore		Heideköpfe Ballpark, Heidenheim; Attendance: 40

July 26, 2010; 14:30	Czech Republic	10 – 1 (F/8)	Belgium	Heideköpfe Ballpark, Heidenheim; Attendance: 550
July 26, 2010; 14:30		Boxscore		Heideköpfe Ballpark, Heidenheim; Attendance: 550

July 26, 2010; 17:00	France	10 – 2	Ukraine	Atomics Ballpark, Neuenburg; Attendance: 257
July 26, 2010; 17:00		Boxscore		Atomics Ballpark, Neuenburg; Attendance: 257

July 27, 2010; 10:30	France	8 – 2	Belgium	Stuttgart Ballpark, Stuttgart; Attendance: 100
July 27, 2010; 10:30		Boxscore		Stuttgart Ballpark, Stuttgart; Attendance: 100

July 27, 2010; 14:30	Belgium	0 – 10	Netherlands	Stuttgart Ballpark, Stuttgart; Attendance: 400
July 27, 2010; 14:30		Boxscore		Stuttgart Ballpark, Stuttgart; Attendance: 400

July 27, 2010; 15:30	Ukraine	1 – 11 (F/7)	Czech Republic	Heideköpfe Ballpark, Heidenheim; Attendance: 150
July 27, 2010; 15:30		Boxscore		Heideköpfe Ballpark, Heidenheim; Attendance: 150

July 27, 2010; 19:00	Germany	10 – 9	France	Stuttgart Ballpark, Stuttgart; Attendance: 1,090
July 27, 2010; 19:00		Boxscore		Stuttgart Ballpark, Stuttgart; Attendance: 1,090

July 28, 2010; 17:30	Netherlands	3 – 0	Germany	Heideköpfe Ballpark, Heidenheim; Attendance: 1,250
July 28, 2010; 17:30		Boxscore		Heideköpfe Ballpark, Heidenheim; Attendance: 1,250

=== Pool B ===
==== Standings ====
Qualified for Pool C
Did not qualify for Pool C

Teams	W	L	Pct.	GB	R	RA
Italy	4	1	.800	–	49	8
Greece	3	2	.600	1	31	47
Sweden	3	2	.600	1	34	33
Great Britain	2	3	.400	2	21	22
Spain	2	3	.400	2	34	39
Croatia	1	4	.200	3	23	43

All times are local (UTC+2)

==== Schedule ====
July 23, 2010; 10:30	Croatia	1 – 10	Great Britain	Stuttgart Ballpark, Stuttgart; Attendance: 150
July 23, 2010; 10:30		Boxscore		Stuttgart Ballpark, Stuttgart; Attendance: 150

July 23, 2010; 13:00	Sweden	9 – 12	Greece	Heideköpfe Ballpark, Heidenheim; Attendance: 138
July 23, 2010; 13:00		Boxscore		Heideköpfe Ballpark, Heidenheim; Attendance: 138

July 23, 2010; 14:30	Italy	9 – 1	Spain	Stuttgart Ballpark, Stuttgart; Attendance: 200
July 23, 2010; 14:30		Boxscore		Stuttgart Ballpark, Stuttgart; Attendance: 200

July 24, 2010; 10:30	Spain	7 – 6	Croatia	Stuttgart Ballpark, Stuttgart; Attendance: 370
July 24, 2010; 10:30		Boxscore		Stuttgart Ballpark, Stuttgart; Attendance: 370

July 24, 2010; 14:30	Great Britain	1 – 4	Sweden	Stuttgart Ballpark, Stuttgart; Attendance: 650
July 24, 2010; 14:30		Boxscore		Stuttgart Ballpark, Stuttgart; Attendance: 650

July 24, 2010; 18:00	Greece	1 – 13 (F/7)	Italy	Heideköpfe Ballpark, Heidenheim; Attendance: 100
July 24, 2010; 18:00		Boxscore		Heideköpfe Ballpark, Heidenheim; Attendance: 100

July 25, 2010; 10:30	Great Britain	2 – 12 (F/7)	Italy	Stuttgart Ballpark, Stuttgart; Attendance: 410
July 25, 2010; 10:30		Boxscore		Stuttgart Ballpark, Stuttgart; Attendance: 410

July 25, 2010; 13:00	Sweden	12 – 2 (F/7)	Croatia	Heideköpfe Ballpark, Heidenheim; Attendance: 130
July 25, 2010; 13:00		Boxscore		Heideköpfe Ballpark, Heidenheim; Attendance: 130

July 25, 2010; 19:00	Spain	9 – 13	Greece	Stuttgart Ballpark, Stuttgart; Attendance: 290
July 25, 2010; 19:00		Boxscore		Stuttgart Ballpark, Stuttgart; Attendance: 290

July 26, 2010; 10:30	Great Britain	5 – 1	Spain	Stuttgart Ballpark, Stuttgart; Attendance: 120
July 26, 2010; 10:30		Boxscore		Stuttgart Ballpark, Stuttgart; Attendance: 120

July 27, 2010; 10:30	Spain	16 – 6 (F/7)	Sweden	Heideköpfe Ballpark, Heidenheim; Attendance: 60
July 27, 2010; 10:30		Boxscore		Heideköpfe Ballpark, Heidenheim; Attendance: 60

July 27, 2010; 17:00	Greece	4 – 3 (F/10)	Great Britain	Atomics Ballpark, Neuenburg; Attendance: 259
July 27, 2010; 17:00		Boxscore		Atomics Ballpark, Neuenburg; Attendance: 259

July 27, 2010; 18:30	Italy	13 – 1 (F/7)	Croatia	Heideköpfe Ballpark, Heidenheim; Attendance: 105
July 27, 2010; 18:30		Boxscore		Heideköpfe Ballpark, Heidenheim; Attendance: 105

July 28, 2010; 10:30	Croatia	13 – 1 (F/7)	Greece	Stuttgart Ballpark, Stuttgart; Attendance: 100
July 28, 2010; 10:30		Boxscore		Stuttgart Ballpark, Stuttgart; Attendance: 100

July 29, 2010; 10:30	Sweden	3 – 2	Italy	Stuttgart Ballpark, Stuttgart; Attendance: 150
July 29, 2010; 10:30		Boxscore		Stuttgart Ballpark, Stuttgart; Attendance: 150

== Classification games ==
=== 11th place game ===
Ukraine	Cancelled	Croatia

=== 9th place game ===
Belgium	Cancelled	Spain

=== 7th place game ===
July 30, 2010; 10:30	Great Britain	4 – 8	Czech Republic	Heideköpfe Ballpark, Heidenheim; Attendance: 50
July 30, 2010; 10:30		Boxscore		Heideköpfe Ballpark, Heidenheim; Attendance: 50

== Round 2 ==
=== Pool C ===
==== Standings ====
Qualified for the Final
Did not qualify for the Final

Teams	W	L	Pct.	GB	R	RA
Italy	4	1	.800	–	43	15
Netherlands	4	1	.800	–	41	11
Germany	3	2	.600	1	41	28
Greece	2	3	.400	2	35	54
Sweden	2	3	.400	2	15	39
France	0	5	.000	4	18	46

All times are local (UTC+2)

==== Schedule ====
July 29, 2010; 19:00	Germany	17 – 8	Greece	Stuttgart Ballpark, Stuttgart; Attendance: 300
July 29, 2010; 19:00		Boxscore		Stuttgart Ballpark, Stuttgart; Attendance: 300

July 30, 2010; 10:30	Sweden	3 – 2	France	Stuttgart Ballpark, Stuttgart; Attendance: 200
July 30, 2010; 10:30		Boxscore		Stuttgart Ballpark, Stuttgart; Attendance: 200

July 30, 2010; 14:30	Italy	9 – 2	France	Stuttgart Ballpark, Stuttgart; Attendance: 300
July 30, 2010; 14:30		Boxscore		Stuttgart Ballpark, Stuttgart; Attendance: 300

July 30, 2010; 14:30	Greece	0 – 10 (F/8)	Netherlands	Heideköpfe Ballpark, Heidenheim; Attendance: 120
July 30, 2010; 14:30		Boxscore		Heideköpfe Ballpark, Heidenheim; Attendance: 120

July 30, 2010; 18:00	Netherlands	15 – 0 (F/5)	Sweden	Heideköpfe Ballpark, Heidenheim; Attendance: 250
July 30, 2010; 18:00		Boxscore		Heideköpfe Ballpark, Heidenheim; Attendance: 250

July 30, 2010; 19:00	Italy	8 – 6	Germany	Stuttgart Ballpark, Stuttgart; Attendance: 1,610
July 30, 2010; 19:00		Boxscore		Stuttgart Ballpark, Stuttgart; Attendance: 1,610

July 31, 2010; 12:00	Netherlands	3 – 11	Italy	Stuttgart Ballpark, Stuttgart; Attendance: 700
July 31, 2010; 12:00		Boxscore		Stuttgart Ballpark, Stuttgart; Attendance: 700

July 31, 2010; 17:00	Germany	8 – 0	Sweden	Stuttgart Ballpark, Stuttgart; Attendance: 1,700
July 31, 2010; 17:00		Boxscore		Stuttgart Ballpark, Stuttgart; Attendance: 1,700

July 31, 2010; 17:00	France	5 – 14	Greece	Heideköpfe Ballpark, Heidenheim; Attendance: 185
July 31, 2010; 17:00		Boxscore		Heideköpfe Ballpark, Heidenheim; Attendance: 185

== Final ==
August 1, 2010; 14:00	Italy	8 – 4	Netherlands	Stuttgart Ballpark, Stuttgart; Attendance: 3,248
August 1, 2010; 14:00		Boxscore		Stuttgart Ballpark, Stuttgart; Attendance: 3,248

== Final standings ==
Rk	Team	W	L
1st place, gold medalist(s)	Italy	8	1
Lost in Final
2nd place, silver medalist(s)	Netherlands	7	2
Failed to qualify for Final
3rd place, bronze medalist(s)	Germany	6	2
4	Greece	4	4
5	Sweden	4	4
6	France	3	5
Failed to qualify for Round 2
7	Czech Republic	3	3
8	Great Britain	2	4
Failed to qualify for the 7th place game
9	Spain	2	3
9	Belgium	1	4
Failed to qualify for the 9th place game
11	Croatia	1	4
11	Ukraine	0	5

2010 European Baseball Championship

Italy
9th title

== Awards ==
- Most valuable player: (Italy) Giuseppe Mazzanti
- Best hitter: (Netherlands) Raily Legito
- Best pitcher (earned run average and win–loss record): (Netherlands) Rob Cordemans
- Best defensive player: (Germany) Jendrik Speer
- Most home runs: (Italy) Giuseppe Mazzanti
- Most runs batted in: (Italy) Jairo Ramos Gizzi
- Most runs scored: (Netherlands) Raily Legito
- Most stolen bases: (Italy) Jiminez Chapelli

== Notable participants ==
Several former Major League Baseball players appeared in the tournament. Hall of Fame catcher Mike Piazza was a coach for Italy. Outfielder Gene Kingsale played for the Netherlands. Catcher Erik Pappas played for Greece, which was managed by Jim Essian. Pitcher Dennis Cook was Sweden's manager, and Scott Scudder was a coach.
