= 2003 European Baseball Championship =

Tournament details
- Country: Netherlands
- Venues: 3 (in 3 host cities)
- Dates: 11–19 July
- Teams: 12
- Defending champions: Netherlands

Final positions
- Champions: Netherlands (18th title)
- Runners-up: Greece
- Third place: Spain
- Fourth place: Sweden

Awards
- MVP: (Spain) Xavier Civit

The 2003 European Baseball Championship was the 38th edition of the European Baseball Championship. The tournament was held in Haarlem, Rotterdam, and Amsterdam, the Netherlands from 11 to 19 July 2003 and included 12 national teams of the Confederation of European Baseball.

Netherlands won its 18th championship, defeating Greece in the final, 2–0. Greece, competing in its first European championship, fielded a team with several Minor League Baseball players, including future major leaguers Nick Markakis and George Kottaras and former major leaguers Erik Pappas, Kevin Pickford, and Sean Spencer.

Spain won the bronze medal, defeating Sweden in the bronze medal game. The tournament served as the qualification for the 2005 Baseball World Cup, with the top four teams qualifying for the championship.

== Venues ==
Haarlem	Rotterdam
Pim Mulier Stadium	Neptunus Familiestadion
Capacity: 4,500	Capacity: 2,200
2003 European Baseball Championship is located in Netherlands
2003 European Baseball Championship is located in Netherlands	Amsterdam
2003 European Baseball Championship is located in Netherlands	Sportpark Ookmeer
2003 European Baseball Championship is located in Netherlands	Capacity: 2,000

== Qualification ==
The following 12 teams qualified for the 2003 European Baseball Championship.

Pool A		Pool B	
Belgium	9th, 2001 European Baseball Championship	Germany	7th, 2001 European Baseball Championship
Croatia	8th, 2001 European Baseball Championship	Great Britain	10th, 2001 European Baseball Championship
Czech Republic	5th, 2001 European Baseball Championship	Greece	Winner of Nagykovácsi Pool
France	4th, 2001 European Baseball Championship	Italy	2001 European Baseball Championship
Netherlands	2001 European Baseball Championship	Russia	2001 European Baseball Championship
Sweden	Winner of Alby Pool	Spain	6th, 2001 European Baseball Championship

== Opening round ==
=== Group A ===
Pos	Team	Pld	W	L	RF	RA	RD	PCT	GB	Qualification
1	Netherlands (H)	5	5	0	29	3	+26	1.000	—	Advance to Knockout stage
2	Czech Republic	5	3	2	10	13	−3	.600	2	Advance to Knockout stage
3	Sweden	5	2	3	21	20	+1	.400	3	Advance to Knockout stage
4	France	5	2	3	17	14	+3	.400	3	Advance to Knockout stage
5	Croatia	5	2	3	16	16	0	.400	3	Advance to 9th–12th place round
6	Belgium	5	1	4	5	32	−27	.200	4	Advance to 9th–12th place round

Source: European Baseball Confederation
(H) Hosts

11 July 2003; 13:00 (UTC+2)	Croatia	0 – 4	France	Sportpark Ookmeer, Amsterdam
11 July 2003; 13:00 (UTC+2)		Boxscore		Sportpark Ookmeer, Amsterdam

11 July 2003; 19:00 (UTC+2)	Belgium	0 – 7	Netherlands	Pim Mulier Stadium, Haarlem
11 July 2003; 19:00 (UTC+2)		Boxscore		Pim Mulier Stadium, Haarlem

11 July 2003; 19:00 (UTC+2)	Czech Republic	1 – 0	Sweden	Neptunus Familiestadion, Rotterdam
11 July 2003; 19:00 (UTC+2)		Boxscore		Neptunus Familiestadion, Rotterdam

12 July 2003; 13:00 (UTC+2)	Netherlands	6 – 0	Czech Republic	Pim Mulier Stadium, Haarlem
12 July 2003; 13:00 (UTC+2)		Boxscore		Pim Mulier Stadium, Haarlem

12 July 2003; 13:00 (UTC+2)	Sweden	4 – 6	Croatia	Sportpark Ookmeer, Amsterdam
12 July 2003; 13:00 (UTC+2)		Boxscore		Sportpark Ookmeer, Amsterdam

12 July 2003; 13:00 (UTC+2)	France	9 – 1	Belgium	Neptunus Familiestadion, Rotterdam
12 July 2003; 13:00 (UTC+2)		Boxscore		Neptunus Familiestadion, Rotterdam

13 July 2003; 13:00 (UTC+2)	France	1 – 7	Sweden	Pim Mulier Stadium, Haarlem
13 July 2003; 13:00 (UTC+2)		Boxscore		Pim Mulier Stadium, Haarlem

13 July 2003; 13:00 (UTC+2)	Czech Republic	1 – 2	Belgium	Sportpark Ookmeer, Amsterdam
13 July 2003; 13:00 (UTC+2)		Boxscore		Sportpark Ookmeer, Amsterdam

13 July 2003; 13:00 (UTC+2)	Netherlands	5 – 3	Croatia	Neptunus Familiestadion, Rotterdam
13 July 2003; 13:00 (UTC+2)		Boxscore		Neptunus Familiestadion, Rotterdam

14 July 2003; 19:00 (UTC+2)	Czech Republic	3 – 2	Croatia	Pim Mulier Stadium, Haarlem
14 July 2003; 19:00 (UTC+2)		Boxscore		Pim Mulier Stadium, Haarlem

14 July 2003; 19:00 (UTC+2)	Netherlands	1 – 0	France	Sportpark Ookmeer, Amsterdam
14 July 2003; 19:00 (UTC+2)		Boxscore		Sportpark Ookmeer, Amsterdam

14 July 2003; 19:00 (UTC+2)	Belgium	2 – 10	Sweden	Neptunus Familiestadion, Rotterdam
14 July 2003; 19:00 (UTC+2)		Boxscore		Neptunus Familiestadion, Rotterdam

15 July 2003; 19:00 (UTC+2)	Sweden	0 – 10 (F/7)	Netherlands	Pim Mulier Stadium, Haarlem
15 July 2003; 19:00 (UTC+2)		Boxscore		Pim Mulier Stadium, Haarlem

15 July 2003; 19:00 (UTC+2)	France	3 – 5	Czech Republic	Sportpark Ookmeer, Amsterdam
15 July 2003; 19:00 (UTC+2)		Boxscore		Sportpark Ookmeer, Amsterdam

15 July 2003; 19:00 (UTC+2)	Croatia	5 – 0	Belgium	Neptunus Familiestadion, Rotterdam
15 July 2003; 19:00 (UTC+2)		Boxscore		Neptunus Familiestadion, Rotterdam

=== Group B ===
Pos	Team	Pld	W	L	RF	RA	RD	PCT	GB	Qualification
1	Greece	5	4	1	34	7	+27	.800	—	Advance to Knockout stage
2	Italy	5	4	1	29	10	+19	.800	—	Advance to Knockout stage
3	Spain	5	4	1	21	13	+8	.800	—	Advance to Knockout stage
4	Russia	5	2	3	19	29	−10	.400	2	Advance to Knockout stage
5	Great Britain	5	1	4	14	33	−19	.200	3	Advance to 9th–12th place round
6	Germany	5	0	5	13	38	−25	.000	4	Advance to 9th–12th place round

Source: European Baseball Confederation

11 July 2003; 13:00 (UTC+2)	Great Britain	1 – 4	Russia	Pim Mulier Stadium, Haarlem
11 July 2003; 13:00 (UTC+2)		Boxscore		Pim Mulier Stadium, Haarlem

11 July 2003; 13:00 (UTC+2)	Spain	1 – 0	Greece	Neptunus Familiestadion, Rotterdam
11 July 2003; 13:00 (UTC+2)		Boxscore		Neptunus Familiestadion, Rotterdam

11 July 2003; 19:00 (UTC+2)	Germany	2 – 10	Italy	Sportpark Ookmeer, Amsterdam
11 July 2003; 19:00 (UTC+2)		Boxscore		Sportpark Ookmeer, Amsterdam

12 July 2003; 19:00 (UTC+2)	Russia	4 – 5 (F/10)	Spain	Pim Mulier Stadium, Haarlem
12 July 2003; 19:00 (UTC+2)		Boxscore		Pim Mulier Stadium, Haarlem

12 July 2003; 19:00 (UTC+2)	Greece	11 – 0 (F/7)	Germany	Sportpark Ookmeer, Amsterdam
12 July 2003; 19:00 (UTC+2)		Boxscore		Sportpark Ookmeer, Amsterdam

12 July 2003; 19:00 (UTC+2)	Italy	7 – 5	Great Britain	Neptunus Familiestadion, Rotterdam
12 July 2003; 19:00 (UTC+2)		Boxscore		Neptunus Familiestadion, Rotterdam

13 July 2003; 19:00 (UTC+2)	Italy	1 – 2	Greece	Pim Mulier Stadium, Haarlem
13 July 2003; 19:00 (UTC+2)		Boxscore		Pim Mulier Stadium, Haarlem

13 July 2003; 19:00 (UTC+2)	Russia	7 – 6	Germany	Sportpark Ookmeer, Amsterdam
13 July 2003; 19:00 (UTC+2)		Boxscore		Sportpark Ookmeer, Amsterdam

13 July 2003; 19:00 (UTC+2)	Spain	9 – 2	Great Britain	Neptunus Familiestadion, Rotterdam
13 July 2003; 19:00 (UTC+2)		Boxscore		Neptunus Familiestadion, Rotterdam

14 July 2003; 13:00 (UTC+2)	Great Britain	1 – 10	Greece	Pim Mulier Stadium, Haarlem
14 July 2003; 13:00 (UTC+2)		Boxscore		Pim Mulier Stadium, Haarlem

14 July 2003; 13:00 (UTC+2)	Russia	0 – 6	Italy	Sportpark Ookmeer, Amsterdam
14 July 2003; 13:00 (UTC+2)		Boxscore		Sportpark Ookmeer, Amsterdam

14 July 2003; 13:00 (UTC+2)	Spain	5 – 2	Germany	Neptunus Familiestadion, Rotterdam
14 July 2003; 13:00 (UTC+2)		Boxscore		Neptunus Familiestadion, Rotterdam

15 July 2003; 13:00 (UTC+2)	Italy	5 – 1	Spain	Pim Mulier Stadium, Haarlem
15 July 2003; 13:00 (UTC+2)		Boxscore		Pim Mulier Stadium, Haarlem

15 July 2003; 13:00 (UTC+2)	Germany	3 – 5	Great Britain	Sportpark Ookmeer, Amsterdam
15 July 2003; 13:00 (UTC+2)		Boxscore		Sportpark Ookmeer, Amsterdam

15 July 2003; 13:00 (UTC+2)	Greece	11 – 4	Russia	Neptunus Familiestadion, Rotterdam
15 July 2003; 13:00 (UTC+2)		Boxscore		Neptunus Familiestadion, Rotterdam

== 9th–12th place round ==
Pos	Team	Pld	W	L	RF	RA	RD	PCT	GB
1	Great Britain	3	3	0	16	5	+11	1.000	—
2	Croatia	3	2	1	12	13	−1	.667	1
3	Belgium	3	1	2	8	6	+2	.333	2
4	Germany	3	0	3	6	18	−12	.000	3

Source: European Baseball Confederation

17 July 2003; 13:00 (UTC+2)	Croatia	5 – 3	Germany	Sportpark Ookmeer, Amsterdam
17 July 2003; 13:00 (UTC+2)		Boxscore		Sportpark Ookmeer, Amsterdam

17 July 2003; 13:00 (UTC+2)	Great Britain	1 – 0	Belgium	Neptunus Familiestadion, Rotterdam
17 July 2003; 13:00 (UTC+2)		Boxscore		Neptunus Familiestadion, Rotterdam

18 July 2003; 13:00 (UTC+2)	Germany	0 – 8	Belgium	Pim Mulier Stadium, Haarlem
18 July 2003; 13:00 (UTC+2)		Boxscore		Pim Mulier Stadium, Haarlem

18 July 2003; 13:00 (UTC+2)	Croatia	2 – 10	Great Britain	Sportpark Ookmeer, Amsterdam
18 July 2003; 13:00 (UTC+2)		Boxscore		Sportpark Ookmeer, Amsterdam

== Knockout stage ==
=== Bracket ===
Quarter-finals
Netherlands	8
Russia	0
Italy	2
Sweden	4
Greece	11
France	1
Czech Republic	5
Spain	9

Semi-finals
Netherlands	21
Sweden	0
Greece	10
Spain	0

Final
Netherlands	2
Greece	0
Third place
Sweden	2
Spain	5

5th–8th place
Russia	3
Italy	9
France	0
Czech Republic	2

Fifth place
Italy	2
Czech Republic	1
Seventh place
Russia	0
France	5

== Final standings ==
Pos	Team	W	L
Gold medal	Netherlands	8	0
Silver medal	Greece	6	2
Bronze medal	Spain	6	2
4	Sweden	3	5
5	Italy	6	2
6	Czech Republic	4	4
7	France	3	5
8	Russia	2	6
9	Great Britain	4	4
10	Croatia	4	4
11	Belgium	2	6
12	Germany	0	8

== Awards ==
Tournament Awards
Award	Player
MVP	(Spain) Xavier Civit
Leading hitter	(Netherlands) Sharnol Adriana
Best pitcher (ERA)	(Netherlands) Patrick Beljaards
Best pitcher (W–L%)	(Croatia) Tetsuhiro Monna
Most runs batted in	(Netherlands) Bryan Engelhardt
Most home runs	(Netherlands) Vince Rooi
Most stolen bases	(Greece) Peter Maestrales
Most runs scored	(Greece) Peter Maestrales
Outstanding defensive player	(Netherlands) Vince Rooi

All-Star Team
Position	Player
Pitchers	(Netherlands) Eelco Jansen
Pitchers	(Netherlands) Patrick Beljaards
Catcher	(Netherlands) Chairon Isenia
First baseman	(Spain) Xavier Civit
Second baseman	(Greece) Chris Demetral
Third baseman	(Netherlands) Vince Rooi
Shortstop	(Netherlands) Raily Legito
Outfielders	(Netherlands) Bryan Engelhardt
Outfielders	(Italy) Giovanni Pantaleoni
Outfielders	(Greece) Cory Harris
