= 2001 European Baseball Championship =

Tournament details
- Country: Germany
- Dates: 28 July – 5 August 2001
- Teams: 12
- Defending champions: Netherlands

Final positions
- Champions: Netherlands (17th title)
- Runners-up: Russia
- Third place: Italy
- Fourth place: France

Tournament statistics
- Most HRs: (Czech Republic) Jiri Visek
- Most SBs: (Netherlands) Ralph Milliard
- Best ERA: (Belgium) Michael Leys

Awards
- MVP: (Russia) Rinat Makhmoutov

The 2001 European Baseball Championship was held in Germany and won by the Netherlands. The main venue was the Baseball Stadium Rheinaue in Bonn, and secondary venues were in Cologne and Solingen. Russia was a Cinderella team in the tournament, beating both the Netherlands and Italy and finishing in second place. Russia beat the Dutch, coming from behind in the 9th inning in group play, and beat the Italians in the semifinals. The Dutch avenged their earlier loss, defeating Russia in the gold medal game, 4–0 behind the pitching of Rob Cordemans and Patrick Beljaards.

In group play, Russia lost to Great Britain, marking the first time the British defeated an eventual medalist in the tournament.

== Standings ==
Pos.	Team
1	Netherlands
2	Russia
3	Italy
4	France
5	Czech Republic
6	Spain
7	Germany
8	Croatia
9	Belgium
10	Great Britain
11	Ukraine
12	Sweden

== Awards and honors ==
Award	Player	Team
Most valuable player	Rinat Makhmoutov	Russia
Leading hitter	David Sheldon	Italy
Pitcher with best ERA	Michael Leys	Belgium
Pitcher with best W–L record	Alain Gadoua	France
Most runs batted in	Pavel Chadim	Czech Republic
Most home runs	Jiri Visek	Czech Republic
Most stolen bases	Ralph Milliard	The Netherlands
Most runs scored	Sylvain Hervieux	France
Outstanding defensive player	Alexander Nizov	Russia

=== All Star team ===
Position	Player	Team
Right-handed pitcher	Rinat Makhmoutov	Russia
Left-handed [itcher	Michael Leys	Belgium
Catcher	Andrey Selivanov	Russia
First base	Jairo Ramos	Italy
Second base	Alexander Nizov	Russia
Third base	Jurjan Koenen	The Netherlands
Shortstop	Seth La Fera	Italy
Outfield	Remy Maduro	The Netherlands
Outfield	Roberto De Franceschi	Italy
Outfield	Bradley Marcelino	Great Britain
Designated hitter	Marcel Joost	The Netherlands
