= 2005 European Baseball Championship =

Tournament details
- Country: Czech Republic
- Dates: 7–17 July 2005
- Teams: 12
- Defending champions: Netherlands

Final positions
- Champions: Netherlands (19th title)
- Runners-up: Italy
- Third place: Spain
- Fourth place: Germany

Tournament statistics
- Games played: 62
- Most HRs: (Netherlands) Ivanon Coffie (7)
- Most SBs: (France) Sebastien Herve (5)
- Best ERA: (France) Samuel Meurant (0.00)

Awards
- MVP: (Netherlands) Ivanon Coffie

The 2005 European Baseball Championship was won by the Netherlands, who defeated Italy by a mercy rule win in the championship game. It was held in the Czech Republic from 7 to 17 July 2005, with the championship games held in Prague. The top four teams qualified for the 2007 Baseball World Cup.

== Round 1 ==
=== Pool A ===
==== Standings ====
Qualified for Pool C
Did not qualify for Pool C

Teams	W	L	Pct.	GB	R	RA
Netherlands	5	0	1.000	–	36	6
Italy	4	1	.800	1	31	16
Germany	2	3	.600	3	21	36
Great Britain	2	3	.600	3	21	23
Sweden	1	4	.200	4	11	23
Russia	1	4	.200	4	15	31

=== Pool B ===
==== Standings ====
Qualified for Pool C
Did not qualify for Pool C

Teams	W	L	Pct.	GB	R	RA
Spain	5	0	1.000	–	46	14
Czech Republic	4	1	.800	1	34	17
France	3	2	.600	2	29	10
Greece	2	3	.400	3	15	39
Ukraine	1	4	.200	4	12	36
Croatia	0	5	.000	5	12	33

== Round 2 ==
=== Pool C ===
==== Standings ====
Qualified for championship game
Did not qualify for championship game

Teams	W	L	Pct.	GB	R	RA
Netherlands	5	0	1.000	–	51	6
Italy	4	1	.800	1	33	12
Spain	3	2	.600	2	26	25
Germany	2	3	.400	3	24	35
Czech Republic	1	4	.200	4	7	32
France	0	5	.000	5	7	38

=== Pool D ===
==== Standings ====
Relegated to B-Pool

Teams	W	L	Pct.	GB	R	RA
Great Britain	4	1	.800	–	42	10
Sweden	3	2	.600	2	45	14
Greece	3	2	.600	2	19	43
Ukraine	3	2	.600	2	14	21
Russia	1	4	.200	4	16	21
Croatia	1	4	.200	4	8	35

== Bronze-medal game ==
July 17, 2005	Spain	7 – 3	Germany	Prague

== Championship game ==
July 17, 2005	Netherlands	15 – 0 (7)	Italy	Prague

== Final standings ==
Rk	Team
1st place, gold medalist(s)	Netherlands
2nd place, silver medalist(s)	Italy
3rd place, bronze medalist(s)	Spain
4	Germany
5	Czech Republic
6	France
7	Great Britain
8	Sweden
9	Greece
10	Ukraine
11	Russia
12	Croatia

2005 European Baseball Championship

Netherlands
19th title

== Awards ==
=== Individual awards ===
- Most valuable player: (Netherlands) Ivanon Coffie
- Best hitter: (United Kingdom) Ian Young
- Best defensive player: (Netherlands) Raily Legito (shortstop)
- Best pitcher (ERA): (France) Samuel Meurant, 0.00 in 17 2/3 innings pitched
- Best pitcher (W–L record) (Spain) Javier Civit, 3–0
- Most runs batted in: (Netherlands) Ivanon Coffie, 16
- Most home runs: (Netherlands) Ivanon Coffie, 7
- Most stolen bases: (France) Sebastien Herve, 5
- Most runs scored: (Spain) Javier Zabalza, 13

=== All-Star team ===
Position	Name	Team
Right handed pitcher	Javier Civit	(Spain)
Left handed Pitcher	Patrick Beljaards	(Netherlands)
Catcher	Sidney de Jong	(Netherlands)
First base	Jairo Ramos Gizzi	(Italy)
Second base	Luc Piquet	(France)
Third base	Ivanon Coffie	(Netherlands)
Shortstop	Néstor Pérez	(Spain)
Left field	Danny Rombley	(Netherlands)
Center field	Frank Candela	(Italy)
Right field	Harvey Monte	(Netherlands)
Designated hitter	Félix Cano	(Spain)
