= SV ADO =

Defunct baseball club in the Hague, Netherlands

SV ADO was a baseball club based in The Hague, the Netherlands. The club's top men's team was a regular participant in the Honkbal Hoofdklasse, the highest level of Dutch baseball. It won the league title in 1992 and the European Cup in 1993.

The organization dissolved itself in 2015 after declaring bankruptcy. The club had seen years of declining membership and was facing a €40,000 budget shortfall entering the 2015 season.
