= 2011 Honkbal Hoofdklasse season =

- League: Honkbal Hoofdklasse
- Sport: Baseball
- Duration: April 7 – September 11, 2011

Regular season
- Season champions: DOOR Neptunus
- Season MVP: Vince Rooi

Playoffs

Holland Series
- Champions: L&D Amsterdam
- Runners-up: Vaessen Pioniers

Seasons
- ← 2010

The 2011 Honkbal Hoofdklasse season began on Thursday, April 7 and ended on September 11.

== Standings ==
Teams	W	L	Pct.	GB
DOOR Neptunus	31	11	.738	—
L&D Amsterdam	30	11	.726	½
Corendon Kinheim	30	12	.714	1
Vaessen Pioniers	25	16	.607	5½
UVV Utrecht	17	25	.405	14
Sparta/Feyenoord	16	26	.381	15
Mr. Cocker HCAW	13	29	.310	18
ADO Den Haag	5	37	.119	26

== Team rosters ==
ADO Den Haag roster – 2011 Honkbal Hoofdklasse season
Active roster		Coaches
Pitchers: 12 Raynard Doran; 4 Jurandy Girigori; 11 Quincy Lambertina; 70 Nick Martin; 29 Kevin Nieveld; 69 Carlos Tavares; 35 Dave Veerman	Catchers: 9 Jareau Martina; 7 Remco Seitzinger; Infielders: 2 Jan Baldee; 33 Sidney Ensermo; 14 Gino Hersilia; 16 Gyenuar Lopez; 10 Irving Redan; 44 Jaïr Roseburg; 85 Dave Steward; 99 Enrique Tromp; 8 Joshua Zara; Outfielders: 22 Harvey Gumbs; 3 Gregory Hassell; 25 Calvin Martinus; 15 Bas Mol; 39 Gernald Nicolaas; 23 Patrick Wabbijn	Manager: Aldric Dunlop; Coaches: Gershwin Hernandez

Corendon Kinheim roster – 2011 Honkbal Hoofdklasse season
Active roster		Coaches
Pitchers: 16 Patrick Beljaards; 47 David Bergman; 26 Steven van Groningen; 30 Jorn van Ingen; 21 Duko Jansen; 13 Nick Stuifbergen; 10 Tom Stuifbergen; 15 Nick Veltkamp; 9 Pim Walsma	Catchers: 4 Jason Halman; 2 Sven Jongejans; Infielders: 25 René Cremer; 37 Bryan Engelhardt; 29 Marvin Evangelista; 3 Björn Hato; 12 Björn Henrichs; 24 Onno Jansen (UT); 23 Rafael Jozefa; 11 Rodney Michel; 6 Roy Seltenrijch; 17 Niels van Weert; 18 Kevin Weijgertse; Outfielders: 8 Remco Draijer; 19 Robert Hilterman; 28 Dirk van 't Klooster	Manager: 20 Eelco Jansen; Coaches: 7 Ralph Milliard (bench/hitting); 27 Hans Lemmink (bench/hitting)

DOOR Neptunus roster – 2011 Honkbal Hoofdklasse season
Active roster		Coaches
Pitchers: 10 Jorian van Acker; 27 Graig Anderson; 40 Arshwin Asjes; 3 Berry van Driel; 26 Niels Harteveld; 13 Kevin Heijstek; 35 Diegomar Markwell; 19 Tim Roodenburg; 28 Kevin van Veen	Catchers: 12 Mourik Huijser; 4 Sape Wagenaar; Infielders: 33 Jeffrey Arends; 55 Mike Bazuin; 11 Benjamin Dille; 24 Dwayne Kemp; 30 Raily Legito; 17 Rien Vernooij; Outfielders: 23 Shaldimar Daantji; 34 Eugene Kingsale; 7 Eldrion Regina	Manager: 21 Jan Collins; Coaches: 2 Adonis Kemp (first base); 25 Wim Martinus (third base)

L&D Amsterdam roster – 2011 Honkbal Hoofdklasse season
Active roster		Coaches
Pitchers: 38 Rob Cordemans; 32 Rik Geestman; 9 Ben Grover; 27 Frank van Heijst; 11 Jos de Jong; 39 Jurrian Koks; 46 Loek van Mil; 13 Al Morales	Catchers: 25 Rashid Gerard; 24 Sidney de Jong; 4 Bas Nooij; Infielders: 1 Roeland Henrique Jr.; 26 Percy Isenia; 6 Zaïr Koeiman; 30 Vince Rooi; 2 Nick Urbanus; 12 Tim Vermeij; 34 Seb Visser; Outfielders: 10 Kenny Berkenbosch; 31 Wesley Connor; 23 Bas de Jong; 22 Koen Nooij	Manager: 14 Charles Urbanus; Coaches: 16 Randell Hannah (third base); 3 Raban Schalm (pitching)

Mr. Cocker HCAW roster – 2011 Honkbal Hoofdklasse season
Active roster		Coaches
Pitchers: 22 Dennis Burgersdijk; 26 Joey Eijpe; 48 Joran Klarenbeek; 46 Moises Melendez; 16 Kevin Miner; 31 Maarten Mulder; 34 Kevin Roovers; 15 Robin Schel; 41 Kyle Ward	Catchers: 6 Peter van Doesburg; 27 Joep van Els; 21 Mitchel Koot; 13 Bart Sabel; Infielders: 7 Dirimo Chávez; 4 Randy Daal; 44 Rodney Daal; 32 Juan González; 14 Michael Pluijmers; Outfielders: 2 Adrian Anthony; 3 Wesley Bernardus; 37 Jasper Keijzer; 5 Lennart Koster	Manager: Bill Froberg; Coaches: Ronald Jaarsma; Frans Groot (pitching)

Sparta-Feyenoord roster – 2011 Honkbal Hoofdklasse season
Active roster		Coaches
Pitchers: Bobby Carrington; Gregory Gustina; Rudy Seebus; Ruderly Manuel; Jose Ventura; Glenn Fasting; Maikel Berghmans; Laurens Sakcedo Valdez; Mark Hennep	Catchers Infielders: Ramiro Balentina; Quinten de Cuba; Anthony Vrolijk; Imco Rudolph; Aram van der Wal; Jesus Castillo; Glimphor Rifaela; Outfielders: Brian Biezen; Rensver Jansen; Kevin van Nederpelt; Arthur Bonevacia; Rudney Balentien	Manager: Hans Beekers; Coaches: Dino Anasagasti; Aubrey Martina; Leo Hamerslag; Miranda Noorderbos; Leo Voogd (pitching)

UVV Utrecht roster – 2011 Honkbal Hoofdklasse season
Active roster		Coaches
Pitchers: 67 Timo van Ancum; 45 Bencho Jansen; 51 Sedley Karel; 21 Juri van Leeuwen; 42 Jim Ploeger; 26 Martijn Riphagen; 3 Derek Tarapacki; 18 Hylke van Viersen; 24 Joep de Wit; 39 Orlando Yntema; 19 Jurjen van Zijl	Catchers: 34 Lindell Finsy; 5 Jurien Overman; 38 Giovannie Samboe; Infielders: 17 Fausto Álvarez; 44 Jirka Bliek; 99 Quincy Cairo; 13 Norbert Jongerius; 1 Lynell Koolman; 29 Glenn Romney; 16 Shurti Tremus; 7 Rutger Veugelers; Outfielders: 9 Jeff Delfina; 25 Jeroen Hermans; 15 Brennan Nijhof; 27 Danny Rombley	Manager: Royce Holder; Coaches: Pat Romney; Cliff Foster (pitching)

Vaessen Pioniers roster – 2011 Honkbal Hoofdklasse season
Active roster		Coaches
Pitchers: 34 Eddie Aucoin; 9 Dennis Buring; 14 Dave Draijer; 28 Shane Gnade; 22 Jean-Paul Gulinck; 21 Lars Huijer; 16 Swen Huijer; 12 Kjeld de Lincel; 25 Mika de Lincel; 29 Conrad Orman	Catchers: 19 Mark Duursma; 49 Skip Visser; Infielders: 7 Zerzinho Croes; 17 Kevin Dirksen; 8 Michael Duursma; 30 Dé Flanegin; 2 Mervin Gario; 15 Norbert Lokhorst; 18 Mark-Jan Moorman; 11 Jason Orman; Outfielders: 27 Linoy Croes; 23 Tino van Erk; 10 Nik Gumeson; 24 Jefferson Muzo	Manager: 32 Robert Klaver; Coaches: 26 Peter Barentsen; 13 Theo Geerman

== League leaders ==
Batting leaders
Stat	Player	Total
AVG	Bas de Jong (AMS)	.421
HR	Percy Isenia (AMS)	8
RBI	Percy Isenia (AMS)	31
R	Sidney de Jong (AMS)	35
H	Bas de Jong (AMS)	45
SB	Norbert Lokhorst (PIO)	10

Pitching leaders
Stat	Player	Total
W	Eddie Aucoin (PIO); Rob Cordemans (AMS)	7
L	Nick Martin (ADO); Jurandy Girigori (ADO)	9
ERA	Rob Cordemans (AMS)	0.30
K	Rob Cordemans (AMS)	89
IP	Bobby Carrington (SPF)	72.2
SV	Arshwin Asjes (NEP)	6

(Updated through June 13)

== All-Star game ==
The 2011 Honkbal Hoofdklasse All-Star Game will be the 2nd midseason exhibition between the all-stars divided in teams North and South. The all-stars from Amsterdam, Bussum and Haarlem and Hoofddorp will make up team North. The all-stars from The Hague, Rotterdam and Utrecht will make up team South.

The game will be held on June 19 at the Sportcomplex De Paperclip, the home of UVV.

=== Rosters ===
Votes were cast online. The results were published on June 13.

==== North ====
Team North roster – 2011 Honkbal Hoofdklasse All-Star game
Active roster		Coaches
Pitchers: 34 Eddie Aucoin; 16 Patrick Beljaards; 47 David Bergman; 38 Rob Cordemans; 27 Frank van Heijst; 16 Kevin Miner; 31 Maarten Mulder; 13 Nick Stuifbergen; 15 Nick Veltkamp	Catchers: 19 Mark Duursma; 24 Sidney de Jong; Infielders: 8 Michael Duursma; 37 Bryan Engelhardt; 25 Rashid Gerard; 10 Nik Gumeson; 1 Roeland Henrique Jr.; 26 Percy Isenia; 14 Michael Pluijmers; 30 Vince Rooi; Outfielders: 31 Wesley Connor; 23 Bas de Jong; 28 Dirk van 't Klooster; 24 Jefferson Muzo; Designated hitters: 15 Norbert Lokhorst	Manager: 20 Eelco Jansen; Coaches: 13 Theo Geerman; Ronald Jaarsma; 27 Hans Lemmink

==== South ====
Team South roster – 2011 Honkbal Hoofdklasse All-Star game
Active roster		Coaches
Pitchers: 27 Craig Anderson; 40 Arshwin Asjes; 14 Bobby Carrington; 3 Berry van Driel; 4 Jurandy Girigori; 35 Diegomar Markwell; 3 Derek Tarapacki; José Ventura; 39 Orlando Yntema	Catchers: 13 Ramiro Balentina; 38 Giovanni Samboe; Infielders: 33 Jeffrey Arends; 27 Jourick Blanco; 44 Jirka Bliek; 11 Benjamin Dille; 24 Dwayne Kemp; 30 Raily Legito; 16 Gyenuar Lopez; 44 Jaïr Roseburg; Outfielders: 23 Shaldimar Daantji; 9 Jeff Delfina; 34 Eugene Kingsale; 27 Danny Rombley; Designated hitters: 17 Fausto Álvarez	Manager: 21 Jan Collins; Coaches: Dino Anastagasti; Aldric Dunlop; Royce Holder; 25 Wim Martinus

== Postseason ==
=== Playoffs ===
Teams	W	L	Pct.	GB
Vaessen Pioniers	6	3	.667	—
L&D Amsterdam	6	3	.667	—
DOOR Neptunus	4	5	.444	2
Corendon Kinheim	2	7	.222	4

=== Playdowns ===
Teams	W	L	Pct.	GB
UVV Utrecht	7	2	.778	—
Mr. Cocker HCAW	6	3	.667	1
Sparta/Feyenoord	4	5	.444	3
ADO Den Haag	1	8	.111	6

=== Holland Series ===
L&D Amsterdam won the series, 4–1.

Game	Date	Score	Location	Time	Attendance
1	September 3	Vaessen Pioniers – 4, L&D Amsterdam – 5 (F/14)	Hoofddorp	4:14	900
2	September 4	Vaessen Pioniers – 6, L&D Amsterdam – 5	Hoofddorp	2:56	950
3	September 9	L&D Amsterdam – 6, Vaessen Pioniers – 2	Amsterdam	2:54	1,050
4	September 10	L&D Amsterdam – 8, Vaessen Pioniers – 1	Amsterdam	2:46	1,200
5	September 11	L&D Amsterdam – 10, Vaessen Pioniers – 2	Amsterdam	2:36	1,333

=== Promotion/relegation Series ===
ADO Den Haag won the series, 3–1.

Game	Date	Score	Location	Time	Attendance
1	September 1	ADO Den Haag – 9, Euro Stars – 4	The Hague	3:15	150
2	September 3	Euro Stars – 7, ADO Den Haag – 6 (F/10)	Capelle aan den IJssel	3:15	250
3	September 4	ADO Den Haag – 2, Euro Stars – 0	The Hague	-	-
4	September 10	Euro Stars – 3, ADO Den Haag – 4	Capelle aan den IJssel	2:37	300
