= 2009 Honkbal Hoofdklasse season =

- League: Honkbal Hoofdklasse
- Sport: Baseball
- Duration: April 11 – August 29

Regular season
- Season champions: DOOR Neptunus
- Season MVP: Ryan Murphy

League postseason

Holland Series
- Champions: DOOR Neptunus
- Runners-up: Konica Minolta Pioniers
- Finals MVP: Benjamin Dille

Seasons
- ← 2008 2010 →

The 2009 Honkbal Hoofdklasse season began Saturday, April 11.

== Standings ==
Teams	W	L	Pct.	GB
DOOR Neptunus	32	9	.774	—
L&D Amsterdam	29	12	.702	3
Konica Minolta Pioniers	27	13	.667	4½
Corendon Kinheim	26	16	.619	6½
Sparta/Feyenoord	24	17	.583	8
Mr. Cocker HCAW	11	30	.274	21
ADO Den Haag	10	31	.250	22
MediaMonks RCH	5	36	.131	27

== League leaders ==
Batting leaders
Stat	Player	Total
AVG	Kenny Berkenbosch (AMS)	.402
HR	Bryan Engelhardt (KIN)	8
RBI	Jeffrey Arends (NEP)	48
R	Eugene Kingsale (NEP)	37
H	Wesley Connor (PIO)	61
SB	Jefferson Muzo (PIO)	23

Pitching leaders
Stat	Player	Total
W	Diegomar Markwell (NEP); Kevin Heijstek (NEP); Ryan Murphy (PIO)	10
L	Jurrian Koks (ADO)	11
ERA	Ryan Murphy (PIO)	0.89
K	Ryan Murphy (PIO)	104
IP	Ryan Murphy (PIO)	110.2
SV	Pim Walsma (AMS)	10

== Postseason ==
=== Playoffs ===
The playoffs began on Thursday, August 6.

==== Neptunus vs. Kinheim ====
Neptunus won the series, 3–0.

Game	Date	Score	Location	Time	Attendance
1	August 6	DOOR Neptunus – 7, Corendon Kinheim – 4	Rotterdam	-	-
2	August 8	Corendon Kinheim – 1, DOOR Neptunus – 9	Haarlem	-	-
3	August 9	DOOR Neptunus – 3, Corendon Kinheim – 1	Rotterdam	-	-

==== Amsterdam vs. Pioniers ====
Pioniers won the series, 3–1.

Game	Date	Score	Location	Time	Attendance
1	August 6	L&D Amsterdam – 11, Konica Minolta Pioniers – 3	Amsterdam	-	-
2	August 8	Konica Minolta Pioniers – 2, L&D Amsterdam – 1	Hoofddorp	-	-
3	August 9	L&D Amsterdam – 4, Konica Minolta Pioniers – 9	Amsterdam	-	-
4	August 15	Konica Minolta Pioniers – 4, L&D Amsterdam – 2	Hoofddorp	-	-

== Holland Series ==
The Holland Series will begin on Saturday, September 4.

=== Neptunus vs. Pioniers ===
Neptunus won the series, 3–1.

Game	Date	Score	Location	Time	Attendance
1	August 20	DOOR Neptunus – 16, Konica Minolta Pioniers – 0	Rotterdam	-	-
2	August 22	Konica Minolta Pioniers – 4, DOOR Neptunus – 2	Hoofddorp	-	-
3	August 23	DOOR Neptunus – 8, Konica Minolta Pioniers – 4	Rotterdam	-	-
4	August 29	Konica Minolta Pioniers – 4, DOOR Neptunus – 5	Hoofddorp	-	-
