= 2010 Honkbal Hoofdklasse season =

- League: Honkbal Hoofdklasse
- Sport: Baseball
- Duration: April 10 – September 18, 2010

Regular season

League postseason

Holland Series

Seasons
- ← 2009

The 2010 Honkbal Hoofdklasse season began Saturday, April 10 and ended on September 18.

== Standings ==
Teams	W	L	Pct.	GB
DOOR Neptunus	39	3	.929	—
Corendon Kinheim	30	11	.732	8½
L&D Amsterdam	25	17	.595	14
Konica Minolta Pioniers	22	20	.524	17
Mr. Cocker HCAW	19	23	.452	20
Sparta/Feyenoord	13	28	.321	25½
ADO Den Haag	9	31	.232	29
Almere Magpies	9	33	.214	30

- The game ADO Den Haag – Sparta/Feyenoord on June 17 ended after the 10th inning in a 2–2 draw, due to the curfew rule.

== League leaders ==
Batting leaders
Stat	Player	Total
AVG	Eugene Kingsale (NEP)	.405
HR	Bryan Engelhardt (KIN)	6
RBI	Bryan Engelhardt (KIN)	36
R	Benjamin Dille (NEP)	38
H	Bryan Engelhardt (KIN); Dirk van 't Klooster (KIN)	56
SB	Bryan Engelhardt (KIN)	16

Pitching leaders
Stat	Player	Total
W	David Bergman (KIN)	12
L	Sten van den Bedem (ALM)	11
ERA	Leon Boyd (NEP)	0.39
K	David Bergman (KIN)	100
IP	Gregory Gustina (SPA)	105.1
SV	Michiel van Kampen (KIN)	11

(Updated through August 14)

== All-Star game ==
The 2010 Honkbal Hoofdklasse All-Star Game will be the 1st midseason exhibition between the all-stars divided in teams North and South. The all-stars from Almere, Amsterdam, Bussum and Haarlem will make up team North. The all-stars from The Hague, Hoofddorp and Rotterdam will make up team South.

The game will be held on July 4 at the Leen Volkerijk Stadium, the home of ADO Den Haag.

=== Rosters ===
Votes were cast online. The deadline to cast votes was June 27, and the results were published on June 28. Most of the players, 14 out of 19, in team South are players from Corendon Kinheim and L&D Amsterdam. Also, DOOR Neptunus brings 10 players to the All Star Game. Current weakest teams in the 2010 season, ADO Den Haag and Almere Magpies, has the lowest number of representatives.

==== North ====
Position	Player	Team
2B	Zaïr Koeiman	Amsterdam
RF	Dirk van 't Klooster	Kinheim
PH/CF	Roeland Henrique jr.	Amsterdam
C	Sidney de Jong	Amsterdam
C/1B	Giovanni Samboe	Almere
CF/RF	Wuillians Vasquez	HCAW
LF	Bryan Engelhardt	Kinheim
DH	Rafaël Jozefa	Kinheim
1B	Kenny Berkenbosch	Amsterdam
C	Jason Halman	Kinheim
3B	Vince Rooi	Amsterdam
3B	Bart Gabriëls	HCAW
SS	Nick Urbanus	Amsterdam
SS	René Cremer	Kinheim
P	David Bergman	Kinheim
P	Joep de Wit	Almere
P	Nick Veltkamp	Kinheim
P	Kyle Ward	HCAW
P	Michiel van Kampen	Kinheim

==== South ====
Position	Player	Team
LF	Eugene Kingsale	Neptunus
LF	Nick Eppinga	Sparta/Feyenoord
2B	Dwayne Kemp	Neptunus
PR/2B	Berti Richardson	ADO
3B	Raily Legito	Neptunus
3B	Mervin Gario	Pioniers
RF	Danny Rombley	Neptunus
1B	Percy Isenia	Sparta/Feyenoord
DH	Lennart Koster	Pioniers
C	Martijn Meeuwis	Neptunus
C	Michel Korzeniewski	ADO
C	Ramiro Balentina	Sparta/Feyenoord
SS	Michael Duursma	Pioniers
CF	Shaldimar Daantji	Neptunus
CF	Jakub Malik	Pioniers
P	Leon Boyd	Neptunus
P	Tim Roodenburg	Sparta/Feyenoord
P	Jurjen van Zijl	Pioniers
P	Dave Draijer	Pioniers
P	Jean-Paul Gulinck	Pioniers
P	Jorian van Acker	Neptunus
P	Berry van Driel	Neptunus
P	Dushan Ruzic	Neptunus

=== Line score ===
July 4, 2010 4:30 p.m. (GMT+1) Leen Volkerijk Stadium, The Hague
Team	1	2	3	4	5	6	7	8	9	R	H	E
All Star North	0	2	0	1	0	0	0	1	0	4	10	1
All Star South	1	0	4	0	2	0	0	0	0	7	10	3
Starting pitchers: North: David Bergman; South: Leon Boyd; WP: Jean-Paul Gulinck (1-1) LP: Joep de Wit (0-1) Sv: Dushan Ruzic (3); Home runs: North: None; South: Eugene Kingsale (1), Percy Isenia (1)

== Playoffs ==
The playoffs began on Thursday, August 19 and will feature the four best teams of the regular season.

=== Neptunus vs. Pioniers ===
DOOR Neptunus won the series, 3–0.

Game	Date	Score	Location	Time	Attendance
1	August 19	DOOR Neptunus – 1, Konica Minolta Pioniers – 0	Rotterdam	3:01	250
2	August 21	Konica Minolta Pioniers – 0, DOOR Neptunus – 3	Hoofddorp	2:53	350
3	August 19	DOOR Neptunus – 8, Konica Minolta Pioniers – 0	Rotterdam	2:24	230

=== Kinheim vs. Amsterdam ===
L&D Amsterdam won the series, 3–1.

Game	Date	Score	Location	Time	Attendance
1	August 20	Corendon Kinheim – 1, L&D Amsterdam – 4	Haarlem	2:37	316
2	August 21	L&D Amsterdam – 7, Corendon Kinheim – 8	Amsterdam	3:07	405
3	August 22	Corendon Kinheim – 4, L&D Amsterdam – 6	Haarlem	3:06	482
4	August 31	L&D Amsterdam – 9, Corendon Kinheim – 3	Amsterdam	2:57	250

== Playdowns ==
The playdowns began on Thursday, August 19 and will feature the four weakest teams of the regular season.

=== HCAW vs. Almere ===
Mr.Cocker HCAW won the series, 3–0.

Game	Date	Score	Location	Time	Attendance
1	August 19	Mr.Cocker HCAW – 3, Almere Magpies – 1	Bussum	2:25	200
2	August 21	Almere Magpies – 5, Mr.Cocker HCAW – 16	Almere	2:57	152
3	August 22	Mr.Cocker HCAW – 7, Almere Magpies – 1	Bussum	2:19	331

=== Sparta/Feyenoord vs. ADO ===
Sparta/Feyenoord won the series, 3–0.

Game	Date	Score	Location	Time	Attendance
1	August 20	Sparta/Feyenoord – 2, ADO Den Haag – 1	Rotterdam	2:41	52
2	August 21	ADO Den Haag – 4, Sparta/Feyenoord – 8	The Hague	3:18	135
3	August 22	Sparta/Feyenoord – 2, ADO Den Haag – 1	Rotterdam	3:11	92

== Degradation Series ==
ADO Den Haag won the series, 3–1.

Game	Date	Score	Location	Time	Attendance
1	September 2	ADO Den Haag – 11, Almere Magpies – 6	The Hague	2:52	82
2	September 4	Almere Magpies – 0, ADO Den Haag – 1	Almere	2:21	142
3	September 5	ADO Den Haag – 2, Almere Magpies – 4	The Hague	2:54	115
4	September 11	Almere Magpies – 2, ADO Den Haag – 3	Almere	3:08	200

== Promotion Series ==
Almere Magpies won the series, 3–0.

Game	Date	Score	Location	Time	Attendance
1	September 16	Almere Magpies – 4, UVV – 1	Almere	2:28	265
2	September 18	UVV – 0, Almere Magpies – 3	Utrecht	2:55	300
3	September 19	Almere Magpies – 4, UVV – 2	Almere	2:33	247

== Holland Series ==
DOOR Neptunus won the series, 4–2.

Game	Date	Score	Location	Time	Attendance
1	September 4	DOOR Neptunus – 2, L&D Amsterdam – 5	Rotterdam	3:05	950
2	September 5	L&D Amsterdam – 3, DOOR Neptunus – 5	Amsterdam	3:00	950
3	September 9	DOOR Neptunus – 3, L&D Amsterdam – 0	Rotterdam	2:29	951
4	September 11	L&D Amsterdam – 3, DOOR Neptunus – 1	Amsterdam	2:26	1,000
5	September 12	DOOR Neptunus – 3, L&D Amsterdam – 2	Rotterdam	2:24	480
6	September 18	L&D Amsterdam – 2, DOOR Neptunus – 5	Amsterdam	2:33	1,200
