= Dwayne Kemp =

Dutch baseball player (born 1988)

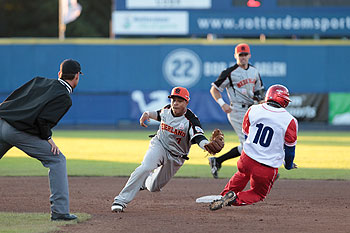
- Kemp (center) in 2011

Neptunus – No. 24
- Infielder
- Born: 24 February 1988 (age 38); Rotterdam, Netherlands
- Bats: Switch Throws: Right
- Stats at Baseball Reference
Medals
Men's baseball
Representing Netherlands
Baseball World Cup
Gold medal – first place	2011 Panama City	National team
European Championship
Gold medal – first place	2016 Hoofddorp	National team
Gold medal – first place	2019 Bonn	National team
Gold medal – first place	2021 Turin	National team
Gold medal – first place	2025 Rotterdam	National team
Silver medal – second place	2010 Germany	National team
Haarlem Baseball Week
Gold medal – first place	2016 Haarlem	National team
World Port Tournament
Silver medal – second place	2013 Rotterdam	National team
Silver medal – second place	2015 Netherlands	National team
France International Baseball Tournament
Gold medal – first place	2016 Sénart	National team

Dwayne Kemp (born 24 February 1988 in Rotterdam) is a Dutch professional baseball infielder for the Neptunus of the Honkbal Hoofdklasse.

== Career ==
On October 20, 2007, Kemp signed with the Chicago Cubs organization as an international free agent. Prior to signing with the team, Kemp had played with the DOOR Neptunus and Sparta-Feyenoord in the Honkbal Hoofdklasse, the top Dutch baseball league. He made his professional debut in 2008 with the rookie-level AZL Cubs, and also played for the Class-A Short Season Boise Hawks, hitting a cumulative .227/.292/.375 with 1 home run and 9 runs batted in (RBIs) in 32 games. He returned to the AZL Cubs in 2009, where he slashed .248/.303/.416 with 1 home run and 12 RBI in 25 games. On March 28, 2010, Kemp was released by the Cubs organization.

Kemp returned to the Neptunus, now known as the Curaçao Neptunus, following his release from the Cubs organization, with whom he has played for since. Kemp was named the league's most valuable playerst valuable player in 2018.

== International career ==
Kemp has played for the Netherlands national baseball team in the 2017 World Baseball Classic and other international tournaments, including the 2011 Baseball World Cup, 2010 European Baseball Championship, 2011 Baseball World Cup, 2013 World Port Tournament, 2015 World Port Tournament, 2016 Haarlem Baseball Week, 2016 France International Baseball Tournament, 2016 European Baseball Championship, 2019 European Baseball Championship, 2021 European Baseball Championship, and 2023 European Baseball Championship. He also played for the Netherlands in 2020 Olympic qualifiers in 2019 and 2021 and the WBSC Premier12 tournaments in 2015, 2019, and 2024.
