= 2013 World Port Tournament =

The 2013 World Port Tournament was an international baseball competition held at the Neptunus Familiestadion in Rotterdam, the Netherlands, from June 30 through July 7, 2013. It was the 12th edition of the tournament and featured teams from Cuba, the Netherlands, Taiwan, and Curacao.

Cuba won the tournament with a 5–2 win–loss record, followed by the Netherlands (4–3), Taiwan (3–3) and Curacao (1–5).

== Rosters ==
Cuba's roster was composed of Yuli Gourriel, José Miguel Fernández, Guillermo Heredia Jr., Yasmani Tomás, Alexander Malleta, Erisbel Arruebarruena, Stayler Hernández, Andy Ibáñez, Eriel Sánchez, Yadiel Hernández, Frank Camilo Morejón, José Dariel Abreu, Yosvani Peraza, Pavel Quesada, Johan Moncada, Ismel Jiménez, Wilber Pérez, Vladimir Baños, Noelvis Entenza, Jorge Hernández, Raicel Iglesias and Duniel Ibarra. Yovani Aragón was the manager. Odrisamer Despaigne was to be on the team but defected shortly prior to the event.

The host Dutch team consisted of Rudy van Heydoorn, Bas Nooij, Jeffrey Arends, Jesse Aussems, Mike Duursma, Dwayne Kemp, Stijn van der Meer, Vince Rooi, Gianison Boekhoudt, Quintin de Cuba, Shaldimar Daantji, Bryan Engelhardt, Roelie Henrique, Danny Rombley, Arshwin Asjes, David Bergman, Leon Boyd, Rob Cordemans, Bayron Cornelissen, Berry van Driel, Kevin Heijstek, Diegomar Markwell, Chris Mowday and Orlando Yntema. Steve Janssen managed them.

Curaçao's roster had the following players: Sherwenne Antersijn, Quincy Ascencion, Sidney Antonia, Ramiro Balentina, Rojean Cleofa, Amir Daou, Johnny Gregorius, Raydell Isabella, Duko Jansen, Kevin Kellij, Randolph Kirindongo, Ruderly Manuel, Dienston Manuela, Quincy Martina, Edinho Meyer, Shurendell Mujica, Mirangelo Muller, Dennis Neuman, Christefer Obispo, Ulrich Snijders, Michaelangel Trinidad, Rupert Ustasia, Raywendley van Gurp and Nick Veltkamp. Johnny Balentina was their skipper.

Taiwan was composed of Jhih-Long Yang, Yi-Hsun Chen, Tsung-Hao Wang, Kuo-Yi Lin, Jung-Hao Hsieh, Sheng-Hsiung Huang, Hsien-Chih Chang, Kai-Chun Chang, Meng-Chen Fan, Chia-Hao Sung, Chia-Wei Huang, Chun-Wei Kuo, Shih-Hao Liu, Han Lin, Wei-Chih Chen, Ming-Jen Kuo, Chun-Kai Liao, Chi-Hung Hsu, Yu-Te Ho, Meng-Hsiung Yu, Ju-Liang Tai, Wang-Wei Lin, Guo-Long Luo and Po-Jung Wang.

== Awards ==
Awards were presented to:

- Best Batting Average: Dwayne Kemp, Netherlands (.400)
- Best Pitcher: Ismel Jiménez, Cuba (2–0, 0.00)
- Home Run King: Alexander Malleta, Cuba (1 HR)
- MVP: Yuli Gourriel, Cuba (.324/.360/.478, 2 R, 2 RBI)
- Most Popular Player: Dwayne Kemp, Netherlands
- Best Rookie: Stijn van der Meer, Netherlands
- Press Award: Michael Duursma, Netherlands
