= Berry van Driel =

Dutch baseball player (born 1984)

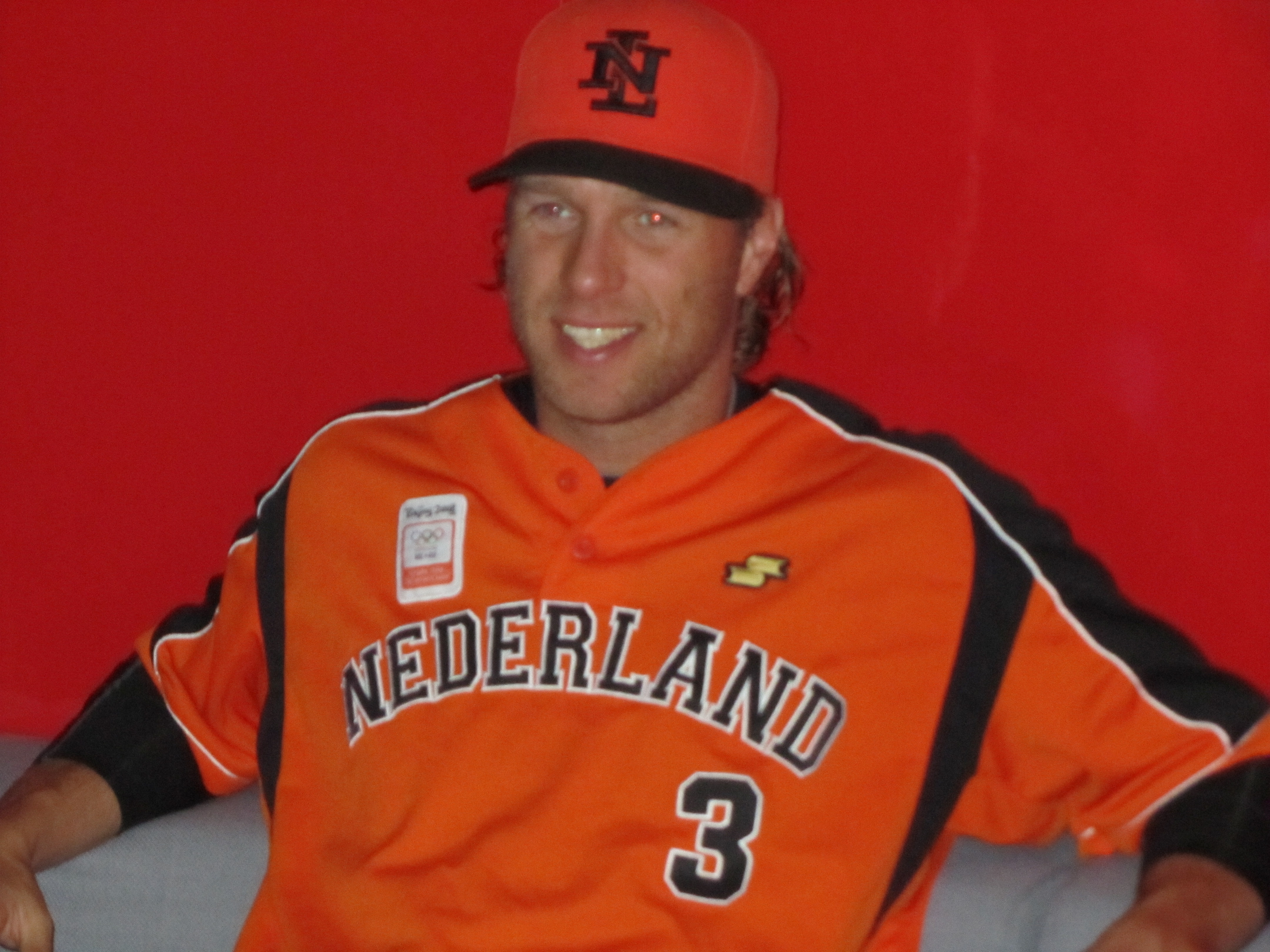
- Pitcher
- Born: 26 December 1984 (age 41); The Hague, Netherlands
- Bats: Right Throws: Right
- Stats at Baseball Reference
Medals
Men's baseball
Representing Netherlands
Baseball World Cup
Gold medal – first place	2011 Panama City	National team
European Baseball Championship
Gold medal – first place	2016 Hoofddorp	National team
Silver medal – second place	2010 Germany	National team
Haarlem Baseball Week
Gold medal – first place	2016 Haarlem	National team
World Port Tournament
Silver medal – second place	2013 Rotterdam	National team
Silver medal – second place	2015 Netherlands	National team
France International Baseball Tournament
Gold medal – first place	2016 Sénart	National team

Berry van Driel (born 26 December 1984) is a Dutch former professional baseball pitcher. He pitched for the Netherlands national team in international competitions.

== Playing career ==
van Driel began playing baseball as a 5 year old. He trained with SV ADO in his hometown, The Hague. He debuted in the Honkbal Hoofdklasse, the top league in the Netherlands, with ADO, managed by Johnny Balentina, in the 2001 playoffs. He was an infielder as well as a pitcher, eventually settling into a relief pitcher role. He moved to Neptunus in 2008. He peaked at 11 saves in 2013 and pitched though the 2021 season, earning 47 saves in more than 200 games with Neptunus. He was named the most valuable player of the 2014 Holland Series, when he was a starter for Neptunus.

After playing for national youth teams, van Driel joined the Netherlands national baseball team in 2007. Prominent competitions included the 2009 World Baseball Classic (WBC), 2013 WBC, and 2011 Baseball Would Cup, which the Netherlands won. He was not effective in the WBCs, allowing 2 runs in 2 innings in 2009 and 4 runs in 1/3 of an inning in 2013. He was 0–1 in the 2011 World Cup, allowing 2 unearned runs in 4 innings. He was named a reserve pitcher for the 2017 WBC but did not pitch in the tournament.

van Driel was also on the team for the 2007 Baseball World Cup, the World Port Tournament in 2007, 2013, and 2015, the 2015 WBSC Premier12, Haarlem Baseball Week in 2008 and 2016, the 2016 France International Baseball Tournament, and the 2016 European Baseball Championship.
