= Darryl George =

Australian baseball player (born 1993)

Melbourne Aces – No. 14
- Third Baseman
- Born: 14 March 1993 (age 33); Carlton, Victoria, Australia
- Bats: Right Throws: Right

ABL debut
- 4 November, 2011, for the Melbourne Aces

ABL statistics
- Batting average: .270
- Home runs: 46
- Runs batted in: 228
- Stats at Baseball Reference

Teams
- Melbourne Aces (2011 - Present)

Career highlights and awards
- Helms Award (2021); Hitting Champion (2021)
Medals
Men's baseball
Representing Australia
Haarlem Baseball Week
Bronze medal – third place	2016 Haarlem	National team

Darryl Roy George (born 14 March 1993) is an Australian professional baseball player for the Melbourne Aces. He has previously played for the Orix Buffaloes of the Nippon Professional Baseball (NPB).

== Career ==
On 28 November 2016, he signed with Orix Buffaloes of the Nippon Professional Baseball (NPB).

On 31 October 2017, he became a free agent.

== International career ==
George was a member of the Australia national baseball team in the 2016 Haarlem Baseball Week, 2018 exhibition series against Japan, 2019 Canberra camp, 2019 WBSC Premier12, and 2023 World Baseball Classic.
