= Diego Markwell =

Dutch baseball player (born 1980)

- Pitcher
- Born: August 8, 1980 (age 46); Willemstad, Curaçao
- Bats: Left Throws: Left
- Stats at Baseball Reference
Medals
Men's baseball
Representing Netherlands
Baseball World Cup
Gold medal – first place	2011 Panama City	National team
Intercontinental Cup
Silver medal – second place	2006 Taichung	National team
Silver medal – second place	2010 Taichung	National team
European Baseball Championship
Gold medal – first place	2005 Prague	National team
Gold medal – first place	2007 Montjuïc	National team
Silver medal – second place	2010 Stuttgart	National team
Gold medal – first place	2014 Brno	National team
Gold medal – first place	2016 Hoofddorp	National team
Gold medal – first place	2019 Bonn	National team
Haarlem Baseball Week
Gold medal – first place	2016 Haarlem	National team
World Port Tournament
Silver medal – second place	2013 Rotterdam	National team
Silver medal – second place	2015 Netherlands	National team
France International Baseball Tournament
Gold medal – first place	2014 Sénart	National team
Gold medal – first place	2016 Sénart	National team

Diegomar Raymundo "Diego" Markwell (born August 8, 1980 in Willemstad, Curaçao) is a Curaçaoan former professional baseball pitcher. He pitched for the Netherlands national team in many tournaments. He played in Minor League Baseball for seven seasons and briefly played in the Chinese Professional Baseball League (CPBL) for the Macoto Cobras in 2007. He also pitched in more than 200 games in the Honkbal Hoofklasse.

== Professional career ==
Markwell signed with the Toronto Blue Jays on August 8, 1996. He had played as an outfielder as an amateur before pitching professionally. He spent the 1997–2003 seasons in the Blue Jays' minor league system. In his time with Toronto, he appeared for the Low-A St. Catharines Stompers and Queens Kings, Single-A Hagerstown Suns and Charleston AlleyCats, High-A Dunedin Blue Jays, and Double-A Tennessee Smokies and New Haven Ravens. He signed with the St. Louis Cardinals after the 2003 season, but did not pitch in affiliated baseball again.

After ending his American career, Markwell pitched for Sparta/Feyenoord in the Honkbal Hoofklasse beginning in May 2004. He switched to another Rotterdam team, Neptunus, after that season. In 2007, Markwell pitched three games for the Macoto Cobras of the Chinese Professional Baseball League. Markwell contained to pitch for Neptunus through May 2023. He won the Hoofklasse's best pitcher award in 2006 and 2018. He was named the league's best left-handed pitcher in 2005 and 2007 by Honkbalsite.

== International career ==
Markwell has pitched for the Netherlands national team in many international tournaments. He pitched in the 2004 Summer Olympics, where he and his team finished sixth. He was 0–1 with an 11.37 ERA, pitching in losses to Cuba and Japan. He also pitched in the 2008 Summer Olympics, with a 4.77 ERA in three games. He was also on the Dutch team for the Africa/Europe 2020 Olympic Qualification tournament in Italy in September 2019.

Markwell pitched in the first four World Baseball Classic tournaments, from 2006 to 2023, throwing the most combined innings during those tournaments.

Markwell was on the Dutch roster for the European Baseball Championship in 2005, 2007, 2010, 2014, 2016, and 2019, the 2006 and 2010 Intercontinental Cup, 2011 Baseball World Cup, 2013 and 2015 World Port Tournament, 2014 and 2016 France International Baseball Tournament, 2015 WBSC Premier12, and 2016 Haarlem Baseball Week.

== Coaching career ==
Markwell retired as a pitcher with Neptunus in May 2023. He became a pitching coach for Neptunus and the Netherlands national team. Markwell was the Dutch team's pitching coach for the 2023 European Baseball Championship.

Markwell was also the Netherlands pitching coach at the WBSC Premier12 2024.

== Personal life ==
Markwell's cousin is Andruw Jones.
