= Orlando Yntema =

Dutch professional baseball pitcher

- Pitcher
- Born: February 21, 1986 (age 40); Puerto Plata, Dominican Republic
- Bats: Right Throws: Right
- Stats at Baseball Reference
Medals
Men's baseball
Representing Netherlands
Baseball World Cup
Gold medal – first place	2011 Panama City	National team
European Baseball Championship
Gold medal – first place	2014 Brno	National team
Gold medal – first place	2016 Hoofddorp	National team
Gold medal – first place	2019 Bonn	National team
Haarlem Baseball Week
Gold medal – first place	2016 Haarlem	National team
World Port Tournament
Silver medal – second place	2013 Rotterdam	National team
Silver medal – second place	2015 Netherlands	National team
France International Baseball Tournament
Gold medal – first place	2014 Sénart	National team
Gold medal – first place	2016 Sénart	National team

Orlando Yntema Peña (born February 21, 1986) is a Dutch professional baseball pitcher. He played for Team Netherlands in the 2019 European Baseball Championship and at the Africa/Europe 2020 Olympic Qualification tournament in Italy in September 2019.

== Career ==
Yntema was born in the Dominican Republic. His Frisian Dutch father worked there as a diplomat, where he married a Dominican nurse and has lived since 1972. After having completed his primary and secondary education in Santo Domingo at age 17, Yntema was signed as an undrafted free agent by the San Francisco Giants in 2003. He played in the Dominican Summer League in 2003 and 2005 and the Arizona League in 2004 and 2006 before missing 2007 with an injury. He played in Class-A in 2008 and 2009 with the Augusta Greenjackets and Salem-Keizer Volcanoes.

He played in the Italian Baseball League in 2010 and then the Dutch Major League in 2011 and 2012.

He also played for the Netherlands national baseball team in the 2010 Intercontinental Cup, the 2011 Baseball World Cup, the 2013 World Baseball Classic, the 2014 France International Baseball Tournament, the 2014 European Baseball Championship, the 2015 World Port Tournament, the 2015 WBSC Premier12, the 2016 France International Baseball Tournament, 2016 exhibition games against Japan, and the 2017 World Baseball Classic.

In 2011, he got the win in the final game of the World Championship final against Cuba. He pitched seven innings and allowed one run.

He played for Team Netherlands in the 2019 European Baseball Championship, and competed for it at the Africa/Europe 2020 Olympic Qualification tournament in Italy in September 2019.
