= Loek van Mil =

Dutch baseball player (1984–2019)

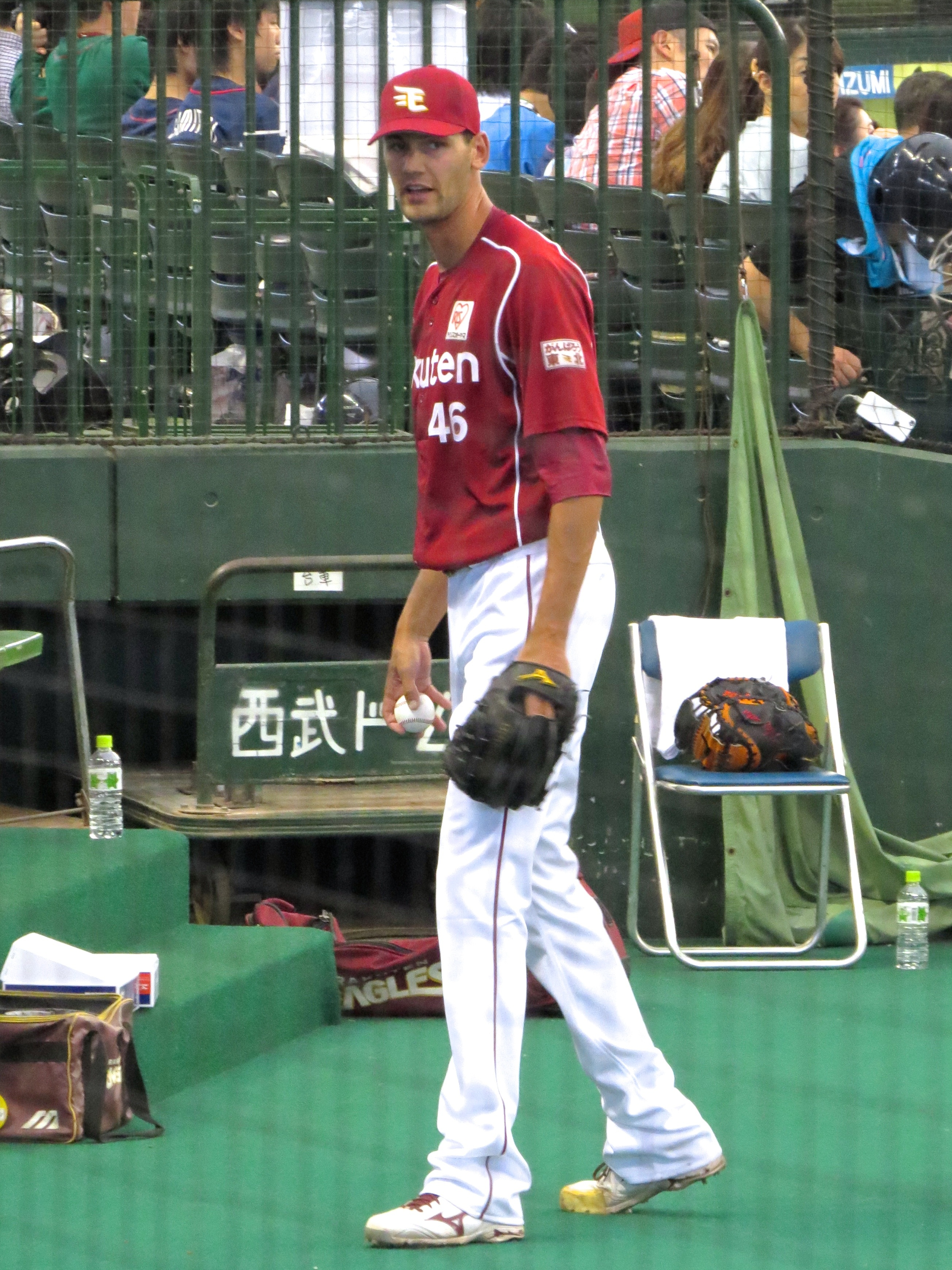
- van Mil with the Tohoku Rakuten Golden Eagles
- Pitcher
- Born: 15 September 1984; Oss, Netherlands
- Died: 28 July 2019 (aged 34); Canberra, Australia
- Batted: Right Threw: Right

NPB debut
- 14 September, 2014, for the Tohoku Rakuten Golden Eagles

Last NPB appearance
- 7 October, 2014, for the Tohoku Rakuten Golden Eagles

NPB statistics
- Win–loss record: 0–1
- Earned run average: 4.15
- Strikeouts: 7
- Stats at Baseball Reference

Teams
- Tohoku Rakuten Golden Eagles (2014)
Medals
Men's baseball
Representing Netherlands
European Baseball Championship
Silver medal – second place	2012 Rotterdam	National team
Gold medal – first place	2016 Hoofddorp	National team
Haarlem Baseball Week
Gold medal – first place	2016 Haarlem	National team
World Port Tournament
Silver medal – second place	2015 Netherlands	National team
France International Baseball Tournament
Gold medal – first place	2016 Sénart	National team

Ludovicus Jacobus Maria "Loek" van Mil (Dutch pronunciation: [ˈluk fɑ ˈmɪl]; 15 September 1984 – 28 July 2019) was a Dutch professional baseball pitcher. At the height of 7 feet 1 inch (2.16 m), he is one of the tallest people to play professional baseball. He pitched for the Tohoku Rakuten Golden Eagles of the Nippon Professional Baseball (NPB). He also played in Minor League Baseball for affiliates of the Minnesota Twins, Los Angeles Angels, Cleveland Guardians, and Cincinnati Reds. He also pitched in professional leagues in the Netherlands and Australia.

van Mil pitched for the Netherlands national baseball team in international competitions, serving as the team's closer in the 2013 World Baseball Classic and the 2015 Premier 12. He also appeared in the 2007 Baseball World Cup and 2017 World Baseball Classic. He missed the 2008 Summer Olympics due to injury.

van Mil died in 2019, several months after suffering a serious accident while hiking alone in Australia.

== Early life ==
van Mil competed in judo from ages 4 through 7. When his mother encouraged him to join a team sport, he chose to play baseball, as he had played a similar game in school.

van Mil reached the height of 1.85 m (6 ft 1 in) at age 12, and grew to 2.01 m (6 ft 7 in) by 14 and 2.11 m (6 ft 11 in) at the age of 15. He played catcher until he became too tall to for the position and shifted to first base. At the age of 17, a coach decided to try van Mil as a pitcher due to his strong throwing arm.

== Professional career ==
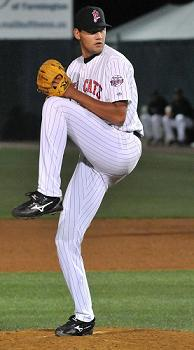
van Mil with the New Britain Rock Cats in 2009

=== HCAW ===
van Mil made his professional debut with Dutch Honkbal Hoofdklasse club HCAW in 2005, with a 2–3 record and 5.26 ERA in 51 1/3 innings in the league. He also pitched in the European Champions Cup in Rotterdam. He pitched briefly for HCAW in 2006, as well.

=== Minnesota Twins ===
van Mil signed as an undrafted free agent on 7 July 2005, with the Minnesota Twins. He first pitched in the United States in 2006 with the Rookie-level Gulf Coast League Twins. He had a 1–2 record, with a 3.30 ERA in 10 games, eight of them starts. In 2007, he had a 2–2 record, with a 2.63 ERA in 13 relief appearances for the Elizabethton Twins of the Rookie-level Appalachian League He walked 17 batters and struck out 23 batters in 24 innings.

van Mil pitched for the Beloit Snappers of the Class A Midwest League in 2008. He had a 2–2 record with 3 saves and a 3.22 ERA and 42 strikeouts in his first 44 2/3 innings, making the Midwest League All-Star game. He suffered a partially torn ulnar collateral ligament in his right arm while preparing for participation in the 2008 Summer Olympics and missed the first seven weeks of the 2009 season while rehabilitating. van Mil began his 2009 season in late May with the Fort Myers Miracle, playing in the Class A-Advanced Florida State League. In August, he was promoted to the Double-A New Britain Rock Cats. He finished the season with a 1–1 record and a 2.79 ERA in 42 games between the two clubs, 25 games out of the bullpen with Fort Myers with a 2.86 ERA and another 8 games with New Britain for a 2.45 ERA. On 20 November 2009, he was added to the Twins' 40-man roster.

van Mil began the 2010 season with Fort Myers. He was designated for assignment by the Twins to open a roster spot for newly acquired Brian Fuentes on 27 August 2010.

=== Los Angeles Angels ===
van Mil was announced as the player to be named later going to the Los Angeles Angels of Anaheim in the Brian Fuentes trade on 1 September 2010. van Mil was on the Angels' 40-man roster for one day before being optioned down to the Double-A Arkansas Travelers. He pitched just one inning the remainder of the season.

With the Travelers in 2011, van Mil had a 3–5 record and 2.04 ERA in 66 1/3 innings across 30 games. He began the 2012 season with the Triple-A Salt Lake Bees, where he had a 1–0 record and 6.30 ERA in 8 games out of the bullpen.

=== Cleveland Indians ===
On 5 May 2012, the Angels traded van Mil to the Cleveland Indians for future considerations. The Indians assigned him to the Akron Aeros of the Double-A Eastern League. In August, he was promoted to the Triple-A Columbus Clippers. With three teams in 2012, van Mil pitched in 41 games, with a 2–1 record, 3.20 ERA, 49 strikeouts, and 23 walks in 64 2/3 innings. He elected free agency on 2 November.

=== Cincinnati Reds ===
van Mil signed a minor league contract with the Cincinnati Reds on 14 December 2012. He pitched in 48 games for the Double-A Pensacola Blue Wahoos, posting an 0–9 record, 3.38 ERA, and 8 saves. He finished the season pitching three times for the Triple-A Louisville Bats.

=== Rakuten Golden Eagles ===
van Mil signed a one-year deal with the Rakuten Golden Eagles of Nippon Professional Baseball in early 2014. He spent most of the year with Rakuten's farm team. He pitched 8 2/3 innings over seven games for the Golden Eagles, with a 4.15 ERA.

=== Neptunus ===
In March 2015, van Mil agreed to a one-year contract with Neptunus in the Dutch Honkbal Hoofdklasse. van Mil was also named to Team Europe's roster for the 2015 Global Baseball Matchup against Japan.

=== Minnesota Twins (second stint) ===
On 29 July 2015, he re-signed with the Minnesota Twins. van Mil pitched for the Twins' Triple-A affiliate, the Rochester Red Wings, debuting on 2 September 2015 with 2 scoreless innings in relief in his first action stateside since 2013. He had two more scoreless appearances for the Red Wings in 2015.

van Mil started the 2016 season in Rochester, but his performance was notably worse. On 10 April, he gave up four runs in 1 2/3 innings with a strikeout against Pawtucket. On 25 April 2016, he was released by the Twins. van Mil had allowed 15 runs (14 earned) in 5 1/3 innings over his five appearances, including one start, with Rochester.

=== Dutch and Australian leagues ===
After the 2015 minor league season, van Mil pitched for Neptunus in the Hoofdklasse playoffs. He then played winter league baseball in the Australian Baseball League with the Adelaide Bite, losing in the Claxton Shield championship series in early 2016.

After he was released by Minnesota in April 2016, van Mil returned to Neptunus. He again played winter baseball with Adelaide.

van Mil's 2017 Hoofdklasse season started late due to a back injury he suffered during the 2017 World Baseball Classic. Serving as the closer for Neptunus, he won the European Champions Cup and Holland Series, being named the MVP of the Holland Series.

van Mil played with the Brisbane Bandits for the 2018–19 Australian season, winning the Claxton Shield but also suffering a head injury while hiking.

== International career ==
van Mil pitched the Netherlands national team in 48 games, beginning with the 2007 Baseball World Cup. He earned 1 win and 2 saves with a 0.71 ERA as the Dutch finished fourth in the World Cup.

van Mil was selected for in the 2008 Summer Olympics. However, he partially tore the ulnar collateral ligament in his right elbow during training in Beijing and did not pitch in the tournament.

van Mil pitched in the 2013 World Baseball Classic and 2017 World Baseball Classic. In 2013, he pitched four scoreless innings over four games, earning one win and one save. In what may be the tallest batter-pitcher matchup in baseball history, the 7-foot-1-inch (2.16 m) van Mil walked 6-foot-8-inch (2.03 m) Nate Freiman of Israel in a game on 9 March 2017. van Mil suffered a back injury during the 2017 tournament. He again allowed no earned runs in the tournament, though he took the loss in the semifinal against Puerto Rico after giving up a sacrifice bunt and walk-off sacrifice fly to score an inherited runner.

== Player profile ==
van Mil threw a fastball that averaged 95 miles per hour (153 km/h), which had been recorded as fast as 99 miles per hour (159 km/h). He also threw a slider and a changeup.

van Mil was 7-foot-1-inch (2.16 m) and weighed 240 pounds (110 kg). He was one of the tallest players in the history of professional baseball, along with former Minor League Baseball reliever Ryan Doherty. His height provided an advantage, because his release point when pitching was closer to hitters, giving them less time to react.

== Accident and death ==
During a December 2018 series against the Canberra Cavalry, van Mil went bushwalking without his teammates near Canberra. During his hike, he slipped and hit his head on rocks. He was unconscious for approximately 24 hours before kangaroos woke him up. He attracted the attention of another hiker, who drove him to a hospital. van Mil was diagnosed with 14 fractures, a ruptured eardrum, and bleeding on the brain. He was cleared to return to baseball in January 2019, in time to help Brisbane win the 2019 Claxton Shield.

van Mil died on 28 July 2019, with a statement from the Royal Netherlands Baseball and Softball Federation attributing his death to a fatal incident. One week earlier, he had announced his retirement from baseball to focus on his recovery.
