= Kingsale =

Kingsale may refer to:

- Kinsale, a town in County Cork, Ireland
- Baron Kingsale, a barony named after the town
- Gene Kingsale (born 1976), Aruban-born former Major League Baseball player, now a professional baseball player in the Netherlands
