= Jim Ploeger =

Dutch baseball player (born 1991)

- Pitcher
- Born: 21 June 1991 (age 35); Almere, Netherlands
- Bats: Left Throws: Left
- Stats at Baseball Reference
Medals
Men's baseball
Representing Netherlands
European Baseball Championship
Gold medal – first place	2016 Hoofddorp	National team

Jim Ploeger (born 21 June 1991) is a Dutch former baseball player. He was a pitcher for the Netherlands national team at the 2017 World Baseball Classic and other international tournaments.

Ploeger began playing baseball at the age of six. He won the Roel de Mon Award in 2009, given to the best Dutch youth pitcher.

Ploeger played college baseball in the United States for Laney College, then the Arkansas–Pine Bluff Golden Lions. In 2013, he pitched one inning of collegiate summer baseball with the Falmouth Commodores of the Cape Cod Baseball League and also pitched in the Hamptons Collegiate Baseball League All-Star Game. Ploeger also pitched in the Honkbal Hoofdklasse from 2010 to 2022, debuting with BSC Almere in a lower Dutch baseball league and also pitching for UVV Utrecht, HCAW, and Amsterdam Pirates.

Ploeger made his debut with the Netherlands national team in 2009, replacing the injured Tom Stuifbergen in the World Port Tournament. He returned to the national team in 2015. He was named to the Netherlands national team for the 2017 World Baseball Classic. He threw one scoreless inning over two games. He also pitched in the 2016 European Baseball Championship in Hoofddorp, earning a win and a save as the Dutch won the tournament.
