= Gregory Gustina =

Dutch baseball player

- Pitcher
- Born: December 8, 1973 (age 52); Curaçao
- Bats: Left Throws: Left
Medals
Men's baseball
Representing Netherlands
Intercontinental Cup
Silver medal – second place	2006 Taiwan	National team
European Baseball Championship
Gold medal – first place	2005 Czech Republic	National team
Silver medal – second place	2010 Germany	National team

Gregory Gustina (born August 12, 1973) is a Dutch former professional baseball pitcher. He was on the roster of the Netherlands national team at the 2006 World Baseball Classic, though he did not pitch I the tournament. He did play for the Dutch team in the and 2005 and 2010 European Baseball Championship, picking up a win against Ukraine in 2010. He represented the Netherlands Antilles at the 1995 Pan American Games.

Gustina pitched for several teams in the Honkbal Hoofdklasse. He debuted in the league with PSV in 2002, moving to Almere in 2004, Kinheim in 2005, then Neptunus before Sparta-Feyenoord in 2009, ending his career after the 2012 season. In 2010, he led the league with 105 1/3 innings pitched.
