= Erisbel Arruebarrena =

Cuban baseball player (born 1990)

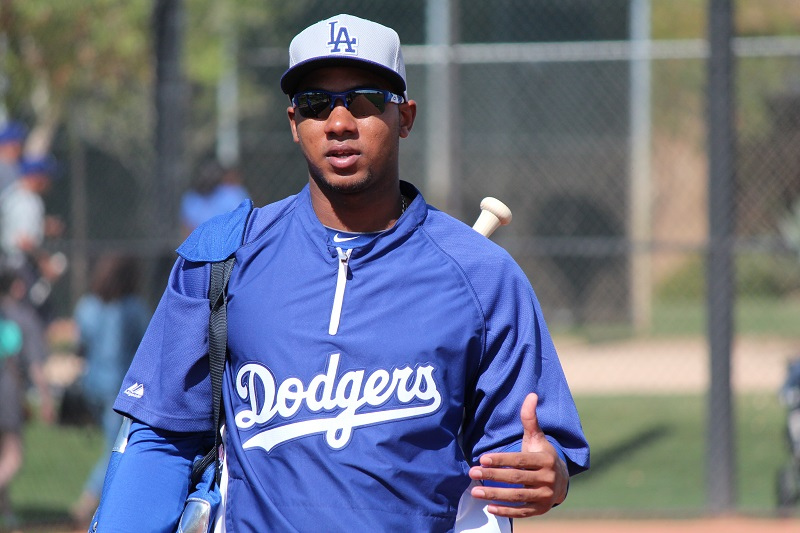
- Arruebarrena with the Los Angeles Dodgers

Cocodrilos de Matanzas – No. 11
- Shortstop
- Born: March 25, 1990 (age 36); Cienfuegos, Cuba
- Batted: Right Threw: Right

MLB debut
- May 23, 2014, for the Los Angeles Dodgers

Last MLB appearance
- September 28, 2014, for the Los Angeles Dodgers

MLB statistics
- Batting average: .195
- Home runs: 0
- Runs batted in: 4
- Stats at Baseball Reference

Teams
- Los Angeles Dodgers (2014)
Medals
Men's baseball
Representing Cuba
Central American and Caribbean Games
Silver medal – second place	2023 San Salvador	Team
Caribbean Cup
Gold medal – first place	2023 Puerto Rico	Team
World Port Tournament
Gold medal – first place	2013 Rotterdam	Team

Bárbaro Erisbel Arruebarrena Escalante (/ˈɛərɪzbɛl ˈʌruːbɑːreɪnə/; born March 25, 1990) is a Cuban professional baseball shortstop for the Algodoneros de Guasave of the Mexican Pacific League and the Cocodrilos de Matanzas of the Cuban National Series (CNS).

Arruebarrena played for the Elefantes de Cienfuegos in the CNS from 2008 through 2012, and played for the Cuba national baseball team in international competition, before defecting from Cuba in 2013 to pursue a Major League Baseball (MLB) career. He played in MLB with the Los Angeles Dodgers in 2014 before a poor attitude and various violations of team rules led to his banishment to the low minors and eventual release. In 2019, he became the first ex-MLB player to return to the Cuban baseball league system after defecting from the country.

== Professional baseball career ==
=== Cuban career ===
Arruebarrena played for the Cienfuegos team in the Cuban National Series from 2008 to 2012 and was a member of the Cuba national baseball team in the 2011 Pan American Games, 2012 Haarlem Baseball Week, the 2013 World Baseball Classic, and the 2013 World Port Tournament.

In September 2013, Arruebarrena tried to defect from Cuba, and was barred from participating in the 53rd Cuban National Series as a result. In November, he successfully defected from Cuba, established residency in Haiti and began working out in the Dominican Republic for Major League scouts.

=== Los Angeles Dodgers ===
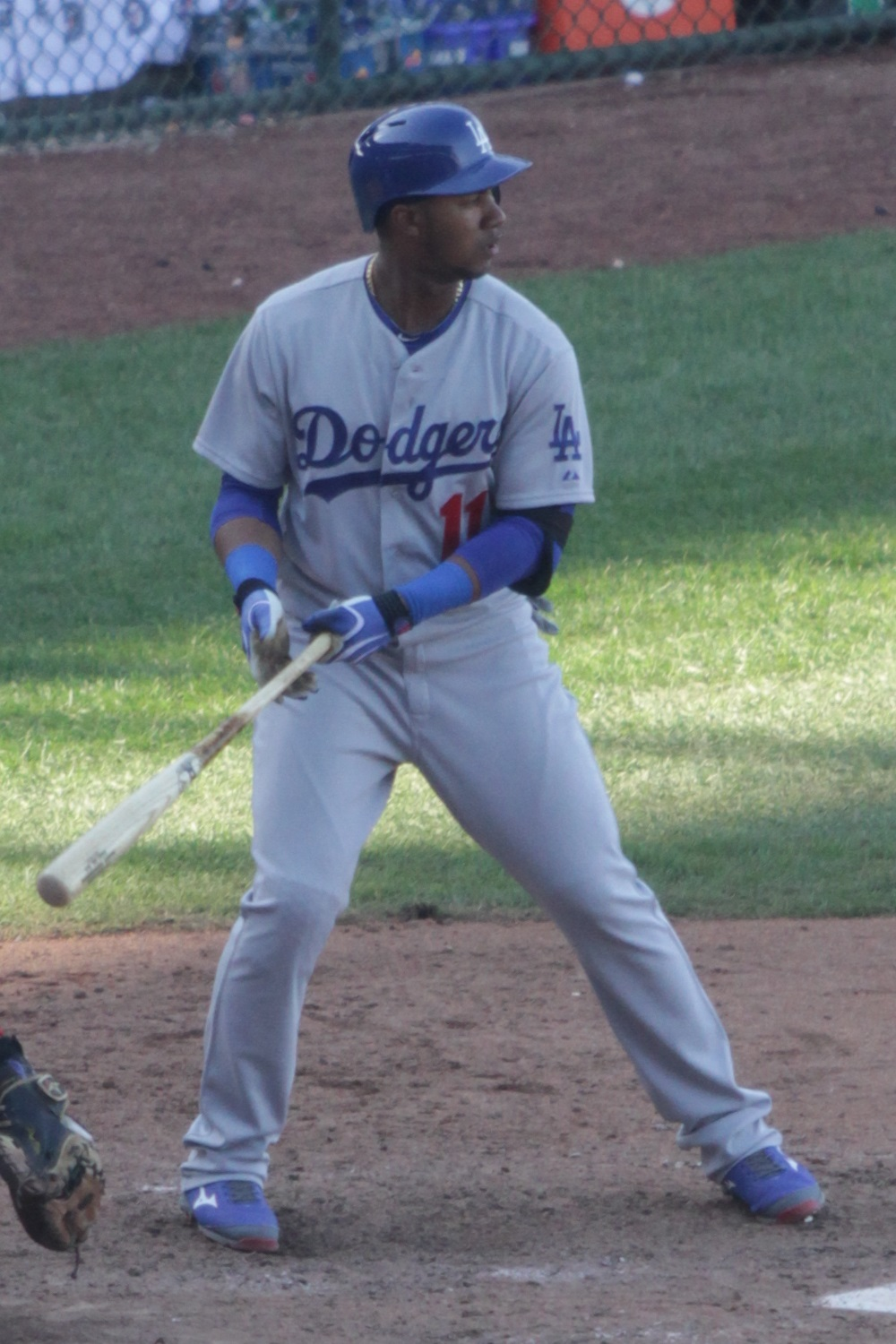
Arruebarrena batting in 2014

On February 12, 2014, it was reported that Arruebarrena had reached a preliminary agreement on a contract with the Los Angeles Dodgers. On February 22, the Dodgers announced that they had signed him to a five–year contract worth a reported $25 million, with a $7.5 million signing bonus. He was assigned to the Double–A Chattanooga Lookouts to start his career, and was called up to the Dodgers on May 21. Arruebarrena made his MLB debut as the starting shortstop for the Dodgers on May 23, and struck out three times in the game. He recorded his first hit the next day, on a single to center field off of David Buchanan of the Philadelphia Phillies.

On July 26, Arruebarrena started a massive brawl between the Albuquerque Isotopes and Reno Aces in a Triple–A game. The day before, he had spent a long time circling the bases after hitting a three–run homer, and in his first at–bat, he was nearly hit by a pitch. After he struck out, the opposing catcher "brushed him" as he threw to third base, Arruebarrena shoved the catcher, and both benches cleared. He was reassigned to the Single–A Rancho Cucamonga Quakes the next day. He played in 68 total games in the minor leagues in 2014 and hit .259. In 22 games with the Dodgers, he was primarily used as a defensive replacement, but also had eight hits in 41 at–bats, for a .195 average.

Arruebarrena was designated for assignment by the Dodgers on December 31, 2014. He cleared waivers and accepted an outright assignment to the Dodgers' new Triple–A affiliate, the Oklahoma City Dodgers, on January 9, 2015. He was also invited to attend major league spring training as a non-roster player.

Arruebarrena was not immediately assigned to any affiliates and began 2015 in extended spring training in Arizona. On May 21, 2015, he was suspended indefinitely by the team, without pay, for disciplinary reasons. After Arruebarrena appealed to the commissioner's office, the suspension was reduced to 30 days. He spent the entire season in the minor leagues, first with three games for the rookie–level Arizona League Dodgers, then 12 games with Rancho Cucamonga before spending 38 games with the Double–A Tulsa Drillers. Overall, Arruebarrena hit .299 in 53 games with three home runs and 15 RBI.

Arruebarrena returned to Tulsa to start the 2016 season. In 17 games, he hit only .182. On May 4, 2016, the Dodgers announced that he would be suspended for the rest of the season for "repeated failure to comply with the terms of his contract." In the 2017 season, he was not assigned to any affiliates until late in the year, and only appeared in eight games for the AZL Dodgers, where he hit .519 (14 hits in 27 at–bats). Arruebarrena did not appear in any games for the organization in 2018, and was eventually released on August 14, 2018.

=== Return to Cuba ===
In 2019, Arruebarrena repatriated to Cuba and joined the Cocodrilos de Matanzas of the Cuban National Series. He thus became the first Cuban ex-MLB player to return to the Cuban baseball league system. With Matanzas' victory in the 2019/20 CNS, he also became the first ex-MLB player to win a domestic Series title after repatriating.

On November 2, 2020, Arruebarrena signed with the Pericos de Puebla of the Mexican League. However, he never appeared in a game for the team.

Arruebarrena played for the Cuban national team in the 2023 World Baseball Classic.

== See also ==
- List of baseball players who defected from Cuba
