= Tom Stuifbergen =

Dutch baseball player (born 1988)

- Pitcher
- Born: 26 September 1988 (age 38); Breda, Netherlands
- Bats: Right Throws: Right
- Stats at Baseball Reference
Medals
Men's baseball
Representing Netherlands
Baseball World Cup
Gold medal – first place	2011 Panama City	National team
Intercontinental Cup
Silver medal – second place	2006 Taichung	National team
Silver medal – second place	2010 Taichung	National team
European Baseball Championship
Gold medal – first place	2014 Brno	National team
Gold medal – first place	2019 Bonn	National team
Haarlem Baseball Week
Gold medal – first place	2016 Haarlem	National team
France International Baseball Tournament
Gold medal – first place	2014 Sénart	National team
Gold medal – first place	2016 Sénart	National team

Tom Stuifbergen (born 26 September 1988) is a Dutch former professional baseball pitcher. He pitched for the Netherlands in the 2009, 2013, and 2017 World Baseball Classic and other international tournaments. He pitched in the American minor leagues from 2007 to 2013, then in the Honkbal Hoofdklasse through 2021.

== Professional career ==
Stuifbergen played for the Amsterdam Pirates in the Honkbal Hoofdklasse in 2005 and 2006 before signing as a free agent with the Minnesota Twins on 23 August 2006. In 2007, he was 0–0 with a 2.19 earned run average and nine strikeouts in 12 1/3 innings for the Gulf Coast League Twins. A shoulder injury did not allow him to pitch in 2008. He returned to the minors in 2009. He reached Triple-A in 2011, ending his time in America in 2013.

Stuifbergen pitched for Kinheim in the Hoofdklasse from 2014 to 2017, then moved to Haarlem rival DSS Haarlem, pitched for Amsterdam Pirates in 2019, then pitched for DSS/Kinheim in 2021.

== International career ==
Stuifbergen made his debut for the Netherlands national baseball team on 12 July 2006 against Italy in the European Baseball Series. He was the winning pitcher, throwing six shutout innings with three strikeouts, five hits and one base on balls. In his second start for the Netherlands, at the Haarlem Baseball Week against Japan, he threw 4 2/3 innings and gave up four earned runs with one strikeout, eight hits and one walk. That November, he played in the Intercontinental Cup where the team was runner-up to Cuba. He pitched 7 1/3 innings in 4 appearances. His record was 2–1 with a 3.68 ERA, three strikeouts, three walks, and nine hits.

In the 2009 World Baseball Classic (WBC), he started the Netherlands' second game against the favored Dominican Republic. He pitched four innings, had three strikeouts, and allowed no runs. The Dutch went on to win the game, their second of the tournament, to advance to the second round.

Stuifbergen was one of the top Dutch pitchers at the 2011 Baseball World Cup, which the Netherlands won.

He returned to the Dutch team at the 2013 and 2017 WBCs. He was 0–1 with an 11.37 ERA in 2013, then 0–1 with a 3.86 ERA in 2017. He played for the Netherlands in the 2019 European Baseball Championship, Africa/Europe 2020 Olympic Qualification tournament in September 2019, and 2019 WBSC Premier12.

== Pitching style ==
Stuifbergen repertoire included a fastball that ranged from high 80s to low 90s, a changeup and a curveball.

== Personal life ==
Stuifbergen's older brother, Nick, also pitched for the Netherlands national team.

Stuifbergen was represented by CSE Sports & Entertainment.
