= Lower Columbia College =

Community college in Longview, Washington, US

Coordinates: 46°08′35″N 122°56′15″W

- Type: Public community college
- Established: 1934
- President: Kristen Finnel (interim)
- Location: Longview, Washington, United States
- Mascot: Red Devils
- Website: lowercolumbia.edu

Lower Columbia College (LCC) is a public community college in Longview, Washington. LCC offers over 90 high school diploma, certificate, associate, and bachelor's degree options in eight career pathways.

== Admissions ==
There are no minimum academic requirements or essays required to enroll at LCC. Financial aid and scholarships are available to eligible students.

== History ==
LCC was established in 1934 as Lower Columbia Junior College. First-time students registered for classes at Korten’s Music Store in Longview, Dahlman Hardware in Castle Rock, and the Orr Furniture Store in Kelso. Accounts of the number of students who enrolled that first year vary from 42 to 55. Students managing the college’s first student newspaper, The Lower Columbian, produced ten issues that year. The founding faculty held classes at R.A. Long High School. The first graduating class of seven students received their associate degrees in 1936.

The number of enrolled students doubled in the college’s second year, climbing to 96. As the number of students increased, instruction expanded into the Myklebust building in downtown Longview and the Moose Hall. The Moose Hall continued to house classes until 1949, when damage from an earthquake caused the building to be condemned. Classes were also held on the first floor of the Longview Public Library. Enrollment continued to increase, with 149 students in 1939, up to 200 in the early 1950s, and finally reached 300 students in 1954. The proportion of female students also increased during that time. In 1948, the college received its first accreditation from the Northwest Commission on Colleges and Universities.

During the 1930s and 1940s, the college struggled with financial problems and began to look for its own campus. Twenty-six acres were purchased from the Longview Company in 1942, at a reported bargain price. In 1950, construction began on Old Main, LCC's first permanent building. The original building was slated to have thirteen classrooms and came with a price tag of a quarter of a million dollars. The Lower Columbia College League, an association of friends of the college, assisted with fundraising efforts to pay for the construction.

After the College had achieved financial stability, it became a part of the Longview School District. In 1961, the college was elevated from a "junior college" to a "community college". In 1967, LCC joined the state-supported community college system. In 2025, the college included 27 buildings on 38.75 acres and enrolled over 4,000 students.

== Foundation ==
The Lower Columbia College Foundation was formed in 1976 with the help of Phillip and Jeanne Wertheimer. The Foundation's mission is to provide financial support where public funds are insufficient and to gather support for enhancing educational opportunities at LCC.

== Student life ==
Student life at LCC including the student government (Associated Students of Lower Columbia College), student clubs and organizations, gym and fitness center, the Red Devil Wellbeing program, and student awards.

== Athletics ==
Lower Columbia College participates in the Northwest Athletic Conference (NWAC). Prior to the formation of the NWAACC, LCC was one of the charter members of the original Washington State Junior College Athletic Conference *(WSJCAC). LCC competes in six intercollegiate sports: two men's teams and four women's teams. As of March 2025, LCC's Program of Champions had collected 103 Divisional Championships.

== Notable alumni ==
- Bud Black, MLB manager
- Gustav Hasford, novelist and marine
- Philip Jalalpoor, professional basketball player and coach
- Billy Jones, college baseball coach
- Mary Klicka, dietician, food technologist for the United States Army
- Joe Kraemer, MLB player
- Marlon Lundgren Garcia, Online personality
- Bas Nooij, Netherlands national baseball team, player
- Krist Novoselic, American rock musician
- Sid Snyder, politician and businessman
- Rick Sweet, professional baseball manager, former MLB player
- Pim Walsma, baseball player for the Dutch national team
