= 2026 Haarlem Baseball Week =

Tournament details
- Country: Netherlands
- City: Haarlem
- Dates: 26 June – 4 July 2026
- Teams: 6

Final positions
- Champions: Italy (2nd title)
- Runners-up: Netherlands
- Third place: Chinese Taipei
- Fourth place: Curaçao

Tournament statistics
- Games played: 20
- Attendance: 39,575 (1,979 per game)
- Best BA: (Netherlands) Marnix Ruben (.500)
- Most HRs: (Netherlands) Shervyen Newton (3)
- Best ERA: (Italy) Matteo Bocchi (0.00)

Awards
- MVP: (Netherlands) Delano Selassa

The 2026 Haarlem Baseball Week was a international baseball competition held at the Pim Mulier Stadium in Haarlem, the Netherlands from 26 June to 4 July 2026. It was the 32nd edition of the tournament.

== Teams ==
A usual number of six teams were invited to the tournament.

Chinese Taipei^{1}	12th appearance
Curaçao	3rd appearance
Czechia	1st appearance
Italy	8th appearance
International Globetrotters^{2}	1st appearance
Netherlands	Host nation

^1 Chinese Taipei is the official IBAF designation for the team representing Taiwan.

^2 The International Globetrotters are a team organized by Baseball Jobs Overseas, a service that helps American, Canadian, and international baseball players find professional and semi-professional clubs around the world.

== Opening round ==
=== Standings ===
Teams	W	L	Pct.	GB
Italy	4	1	.800	—
Netherlands	4	1	.800	—
Chinese Taipei	3	2	.600	1
Curaçao	2	3	.400	2
International Globetrotters	1	4	.200	3
Czechia	1	4	.200	3

== Final round ==
2 July 2026 - Play Off 1	Chinese Taipei	5 – 2	Curaçao	Pim Mulier Stadium, Haarlem; Attendance: 987
2 July 2026 - Play Off 1		Boxscore		Pim Mulier Stadium, Haarlem; Attendance: 987

2 July 2026 - Play Off 2	Italy	1 – 0	Netherlands	Pim Mulier Stadium, Haarlem; Attendance: 1,986
2 July 2026 - Play Off 2		Boxscore		Pim Mulier Stadium, Haarlem; Attendance: 1,986

3 July 2026 - 5th/6th place	International Globetrotters	5 – 6 (F/10)	Czechia	Pim Mulier Stadium, Haarlem; Attendance: 1,469
3 July 2026 - 5th/6th place		Boxscore		Pim Mulier Stadium, Haarlem; Attendance: 1,469

3 July 2026 - Play Off 3	Netherlands	9 – 1	Chinese Taipei	Pim Mulier Stadium, Haarlem; Attendance: 1,777
3 July 2026 - Play Off 3		Boxscore		Pim Mulier Stadium, Haarlem; Attendance: 1,777

4 July 2026 - Gold Medal Game	Italy	4 – 3	Netherlands	Pim Mulier Stadium, Haarlem; Attendance: 3,895
4 July 2026 - Gold Medal Game		Boxscore		Pim Mulier Stadium, Haarlem; Attendance: 3,895

== Final standings ==
Rk	Team
1	Italy
2	Netherlands
3	Chinese Taipei
4	Curaçao
5	Czechia
6	International Globetrotters

2026 Haarlem Baseball Week champions

Italy
2nd title
