= 2006 Haarlem Baseball Week =

2006 international baseball competition

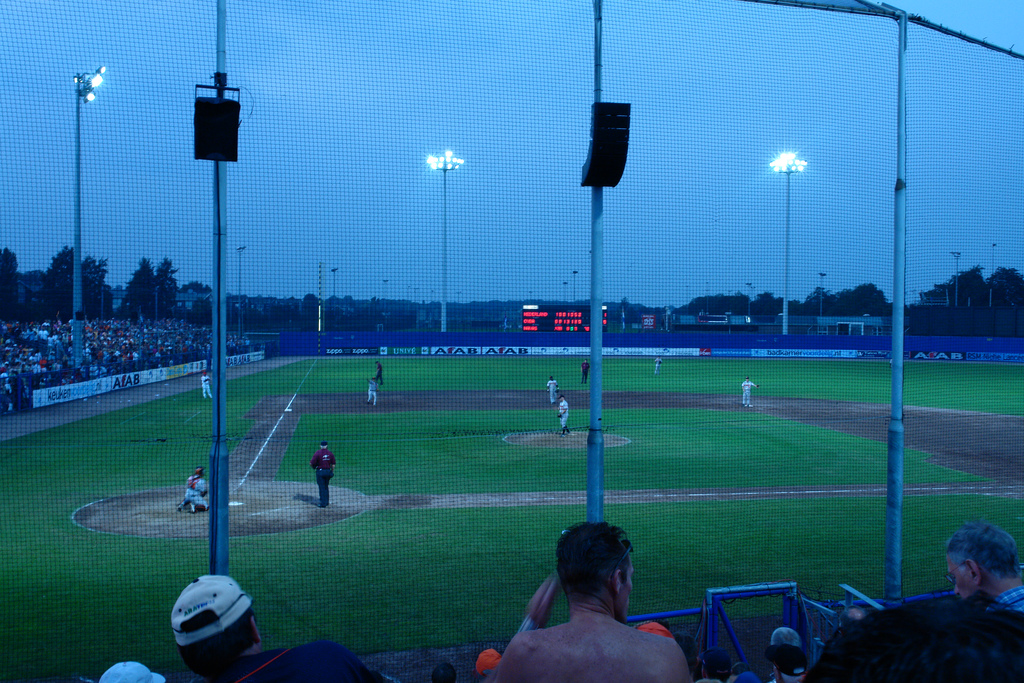
- Pim Mulier Stadium during HBW 2006

Tournament details
- Country: Netherlands
- City: Haarlem
- Dates: 21–30 July
- Teams: 6

Final positions
- Champions: Netherlands (2nd title)
- Runners-up: Cuba
- Third place: United States
- Fourth place: Japan

Awards
- MVP: (Netherlands) Bryan Engelhardt

The 2006 Haarlem Baseball Week was an international baseball competition held at the Pim Mulier Stadium in Haarlem, the Netherlands from July 21 to 30, 2006. It was the 23rd edition of the tournament and featured teams from China, Chinese Taipei, Cuba, Japan, Netherlands and United States.

Most countries did not send their top players to the tournament. The U.S. team was made up of college players from the Northwest Athletic Association of Community Colleges. Japan's team includes players from its non-professional Industrial League. Cuba sent its reserve squad, due to the Central American and Caribbean Games occurring at the same time. However, most of China's players from the 2006 World Baseball Classic competed in the tournament.

The Netherlands won their second straight title and swept all the individual awards.

== Group stage ==
=== Standings ===
Qualified for the final
Did not qualify for the final

#	Team	Games	Wins	Losses
1	Cuba	5	5	0
2	Netherlands	5	4	1
3	United States	5	2	3
4	Japan	5	2	3
5	China	5	1	4
6	Chinese Taipei	5	1	4

^1 Chinese Taipei is the official IBAF designation for the team representing the state officially referred to as the Republic of China, more commonly known as Taiwan. (See also political status of Taiwan for details.)

=== Game results ===
July 21, 2006	Chinese Taipei	4 – 1	United States	Haarlem, Netherlands
July 21, 2006		Boxscore		Haarlem, Netherlands

July 22, 2006	United States	4 – 3	Japan	Haarlem, Netherlands
July 22, 2006		Boxscore		Haarlem, Netherlands

July 22, 2006	Netherlands	11 – 2	China	Haarlem, Netherlands
July 22, 2006		Boxscore		Haarlem, Netherlands

July 23, 2006	Chinese Taipei	1 – 4	Netherlands	Haarlem, Netherlands
July 23, 2006		Boxscore		Haarlem, Netherlands

July 23, 2006	China	0 – 6	Cuba	Haarlem, Netherlands
July 23, 2006		Boxscore		Haarlem, Netherlands

July 24, 2006	Cuba	4 – 0	Japan	Haarlem, Netherlands
July 24, 2006		Boxscore		Haarlem, Netherlands

July 25, 2006	Chinese Taipei	1 – 2	Cuba	Haarlem, Netherlands
July 25, 2006		Boxscore		Haarlem, Netherlands

July 25, 2006	China	5 – 7	United States	Haarlem, Netherlands
July 25, 2006		Boxscore		Haarlem, Netherlands

July 26, 2006	China	1 – 0	Chinese Taipei	Haarlem, Netherlands
July 26, 2006		Boxscore		Haarlem, Netherlands

July 26, 2006	Netherlands	6 – 5	Japan	Haarlem, Netherlands
July 26, 2006		Boxscore		Haarlem, Netherlands

July 27, 2006	United States	1 – 9	Cuba	Haarlem, Netherlands
July 27, 2006		Boxscore		Haarlem, Netherlands

July 28, 2006	Japan	10 – 0	China	Haarlem, Netherlands
July 28, 2006		Boxscore		Haarlem, Netherlands

July 28, 2006	Cuba	11 – 10	Netherlands	Haarlem, Netherlands
July 28, 2006		Boxscore		Haarlem, Netherlands

July 29, 2006	Japan	5 – 1	Chinese Taipei	Haarlem, Netherlands
July 29, 2006		Boxscore		Haarlem, Netherlands

July 29, 2006	Netherlands	15 – 3	United States	Haarlem, Netherlands
July 29, 2006		Boxscore		Haarlem, Netherlands

== Final ==
July 30, 2006	Netherlands	9 – 6	Cuba	Haarlem, Netherlands
July 30, 2006		Boxscore		Haarlem, Netherlands

== Standing ==
Rk	Team
1	Netherlands
Lost in Final
2	Cuba
Failed to qualify for the Final
3	United States
4	Japan
5	China
6	Chinese Taipei

2006 Haarlem Baseball Week champions

Netherlands
2nd title

== Awards ==
Most valuable player	(Netherlands) Bryan Engelhardt
Best pitcher	(Netherlands) Dave Draijer
Best hitter	(Netherlands) Dirk van 't Klooster
Outstanding defensive player	(Netherlands) Dirk van 't Klooster
Home run king	(Netherlands) Bryan Engelhardt
Most popular player	(Netherlands) Dirk van 't Klooster
Press award	(Netherlands) Dirk van 't Klooster
