= 2002 Haarlem Baseball Week =

Tournament details
- Country: Netherlands
- City: Haarlem
- Dates: 19–28 July
- Teams: 6

Final positions
- Champions: United States (3rd title)
- Runners-up: Netherlands
- Third place: Cuba
- Fourth place: Chinese Taipei

Awards
- MVP: (Netherlands) Bryan Engelhardt

The 2002 Haarlem Baseball Week was an international baseball competition held at the Pim Mulier Stadium in Haarlem, the Netherlands from July 19–28, 2002. It was the 21st edition of the tournament and featured teams from Chinese Taipei, Cuba, Japan, Netherlands, South Africa and United States.

In the end, the team from the United States won their second straight and third tournament as the national team.

== Group stage ==
=== Standings ===
Qualified for the final
Did not qualify for the final

#	Team	Games	Wins	Losses
1	Netherlands	5	4	1
2	United States	5	3	2
3	Cuba	5	3	2
4	Chinese Taipei	5	3	2
5	Japan	5	2	3
6	South Africa	5	0	5

^1 Chinese Taipei is the official IBAF designation for the team representing the state officially referred to as the Republic of China, more commonly known as Taiwan. (See also political status of Taiwan for details.)

=== Game results ===
July 19, 2002	Chinese Taipei	0 – 2	United States	Haarlem, Netherlands

July 20, 2002	Cuba	5 – 0	Japan	Haarlem, Netherlands

July 21, 2002	Japan	2 – 3	Netherlands	Haarlem, Netherlands

July 21, 2002	South Africa	0 – 8	United States	Haarlem, Netherlands

July 22, 2002	Netherlands	4 – 9 (F/13)	Chinese Taipei	Haarlem, Netherlands

July 22, 2002	South Africa	0 – 10	Cuba	Haarlem, Netherlands

July 23, 2002	Cuba	5 – 0	Chinese Taipei	Haarlem, Netherlands

July 24, 2002	Japan	2 – 11	Chinese Taipei	Haarlem, Netherlands

July 24, 2002	Netherlands	8 – 3	South Africa	Haarlem, Netherlands

July 25, 2002	Aruba	7 – 15	Curaçao	Haarlem, Netherlands

July 25, 2002	United States	4 – 1	Cuba	Haarlem, Netherlands

July 26, 2002	United States	1 – 2	Japan	Haarlem, Netherlands

July 26, 2002	Chinese Taipei	6 – 3	South Africa	Haarlem, Netherlands

July 26, 2002	Cuba	5 – 7	Netherlands	Haarlem, Netherlands

July 27, 2002	South Africa	2 – 6	Japan	Haarlem, Netherlands

July 27, 2002	Netherlands	6 – 2	United States	Haarlem, Netherlands

^2 Regarding a friendly match, the results didn't affect the standings.

== Final ==
July 28, 2002	Netherlands	4 – 5	United States	Haarlem, Netherlands

== Final standings ==
Rk	Team
1	United States
Lost in Final
2	Netherlands
Failed to qualify for the Final
3	Cuba
4	Chinese Taipei
5	Japan
6	South Africa

2002 Haarlem Baseball Week champions

United States
3rd title

== Tournament awards ==
Best Pitcher	(Japan) Yukiharu Hamamoto
Best Hitter	(Cuba) Rolnier Varona
Home run King	(Cuba) Pedro José Rodriguez (South Africa) Jason Cook
Most Valuable Player	(Netherlands) Bryan Engelhardt
Most Popular Player	(Netherlands) Alexander Smit
Press Award	(South Africa) Raymond Tew
