= Pim Walsma =

Dutch baseball player

- Relief pitcher
- Born: 3 February 1987 (age 39); Amsterdam, Netherlands
- Bats: Right Throws: Right

Pim Walsma (born 3 February 1987 in Amsterdam, Netherlands) is a Dutch former baseball player who was a relief pitcher for the Netherlands national team in the 2008 Summer Olympics and 2009 World Baseball Classic. He also pitched in the Honkbal Hoofdklasse, primarily for his hometown Amsterdam Pirates.

== Playing career ==
Walsma pitched for Lower Columbia College in Longview, Washington, in the United States in 2007. He went 2–3 with a 3.27 ERA.

Walsma debuted in the Honkbal Hoofdklasse with Amsterdam in 2005 and went 1–6 with a 5.11 ERA, walking 38 in 44 innings. He was fifth in the league in base on balls. He fell to 1–6 with a 6.75 ERA and 40 walks in 37 1/3 innings in 2006, finishing sixth in walks. He worked as a starting pitcher early in his tenure with the Pirates. He participated in the Major League Baseball European Academy that summer.

In 2007, Walsma was 1–2 with a save and a 7.62 ERA for Amsterdam, with 19 hits allowed and 13 walks in 13 innings. In 2008, he was 1–4 with 5 saves and a 4.22 ERA, fanning 48 in 42 2/3 innings.

Walsma was added to the Dutch national team for the 2008 Haarlem Baseball Week. He allowed one run in 6 2/3 innings in the event. Manager Robert Eenhoorn then selected him for the Netherlands team at the 2008 Summer Olympics. At the Beijing Olympics, Walsma allowed 6 runs in 4 innings. That year, he won the Guus van der Heijden Memorial Trophy, given to the best national team player under the age of 23.

In the 2009 World Baseball Classic, Walsma started against Puerto Rico, allowing one run in two innings and taking the loss. Walsma continued to pitch in the Hoofdklasse through 2016, pitching for Kinheim from 2011 to 2015 before returning to Amsterdam for his final season.

== Personal life ==
Walsma father also played for the Netherlands national team. His mother, Ietje Walsma-Drupsteen, played softball for the Pirates and other Dutch clubs. Walsma's brother also played baseball for the Pirates.
