= 2008 Haarlem Baseball Week =

Tournament details
- Country: Netherlands
- City: Haarlem
- Dates: 4–13 July
- Teams: 6

Final positions
- Champions: United States (4th title)
- Runners-up: Cuba
- Third place: Chinese Taipei
- Fourth place: Japan

Awards
- MVP: (United States) Ryan Jackson

The 2008 Haarlem Baseball Week was an international baseball competition held at the Pim Mulier Stadium in Haarlem, the Netherlands from July 4–13, 2008. It was the 24th edition of the tournament and featured teams from Chinese Taipei, Cuba, Japan, Netherlands, Netherlands Antilles (including Aruba) and United States.

In the end the team from the United States won for the thirteenth time the tournament.

== Group stage ==
=== Standings ===
Qualified for the semifinals
Did not qualify for the semifinals

#	Team	Games	Wins	Losses
1	United States	5	5	0
2	Cuba	5	4	1
3	Japan	5	3	2
4	Chinese Taipei	5	2	3
5	Netherlands	5	1	4
6	Dutch Caribbean Team	5	0	5

^1 Chinese Taipei is the official IBAF designation for the team representing the state officially referred to as the Republic of China, more commonly known as Taiwan. (See also political status of Taiwan for details.)
^2 The Netherlands Antilles (including Aruba) were represented by the Dutch Caribbean Team.

=== Game results ===
July 4, 2008	Cuba	2 – 1	Dutch Caribbean Team	Haarlem, Netherlands
July 4, 2008		Boxscore		Haarlem, Netherlands

July 4, 2008	Japan	5 – 4	Chinese Taipei	Haarlem, Netherlands
July 4, 2008		Boxscore		Haarlem, Netherlands

July 5, 2008	United States	5 – 2	Japan	Haarlem, Netherlands
July 5, 2008		Boxscore		Haarlem, Netherlands

July 5, 2008	Netherlands	5 – 1	Dutch Caribbean Team	Haarlem, Netherlands
July 5, 2008		Boxscore		Haarlem, Netherlands

July 6, 2008	Chinese Taipei	6 – 4	Netherlands	Haarlem, Netherlands
July 6, 2008		Boxscore		Haarlem, Netherlands

July 6, 2008	United States	1 – 0	Cuba	Haarlem, Netherlands
July 6, 2008		Boxscore		Haarlem, Netherlands

July 7, 2008	Dutch Caribbean Team	5 – 12	Japan	Haarlem, Netherlands
July 7, 2008		Boxscore		Haarlem, Netherlands

July 8, 2008	Dutch Caribbean Team	0 – 11	United States	Haarlem, Netherlands
July 8, 2008		Boxscore		Haarlem, Netherlands

July 8, 2008	Japan	3 – 2	Netherlands	Haarlem, Netherlands
July 8, 2008		Boxscore		Haarlem, Netherlands

July 9, 2008	Cuba	3 – 0	Chinese Taipei	Haarlem, Netherlands
July 9, 2008		Boxscore		Haarlem, Netherlands

July 9, 2008	Cuba	5 – 3	Japan	Haarlem, Netherlands
July 9, 2008		Boxscore		Haarlem, Netherlands

July 9, 2008	Netherlands	1 – 2	United States	Haarlem, Netherlands
July 9, 2008		Boxscore		Haarlem, Netherlands

July 10, 2008	Netherlands	1 – 4	Cuba	Haarlem, Netherlands
July 10, 2008		Boxscore		Haarlem, Netherlands

July 11, 2008	United States	3 – 1	Chinese Taipei	Haarlem, Netherlands
July 11, 2008		Boxscore		Haarlem, Netherlands

July 11, 2008	Chinese Taipei	8 – 5	Dutch Caribbean Team	Haarlem, Netherlands
July 11, 2008		Boxscore		Haarlem, Netherlands

== Final round ==
=== Semi-finals ===
July 11, 2008	Cuba	6 – 4	Japan	Haarlem, Netherlands
July 11, 2008		Boxscore		Haarlem, Netherlands

July 12, 2008	United States	5 – 2	Chinese Taipei	Haarlem, Netherlands
July 12, 2008		Boxscore		Haarlem, Netherlands

=== 5th place ===
July 12, 2008	Netherlands	cancelled	Dutch Caribbean Team	Haarlem, Netherlands

=== 3rd place ===
July 13, 2008	Chinese Taipei	2 – 0	Japan	Haarlem, Netherlands
July 13, 2008		Boxscore		Haarlem, Netherlands

=== Final ===
July 12, 2008	Cuba	1 – 4	United States	Haarlem, Netherlands
July 12, 2008		Boxscore		Haarlem, Netherlands

== Final standings ==
Rk	Team
1	United States
Lost in final
2	Cuba
Lost in semifinals
3	Chinese Taipei
4	Japan
Failed to qualify for Semifinals
5	Netherlands
6	Dutch Caribbean Team

2008 Haarlem Baseball Week champions

United States
4th title

== Tournament awards ==
Best Pitcher	(United States) Mike Minor
Best Hitter	(Netherlands Antilles) Randolph Kirindongo
Best Defending Player	(Cuba) Eduardo Paret
Home run King	(Cuba) Yoandy Garlobo
Most Valuable Player	(United States) Ryan Jackson
Most Popular Player	(Japan) Ryoji Nakata
Press Award	(Netherlands) David Bergman
