= Nick Stuifbergen =

Dutch baseball player

- Pitcher
- Born: 6 September 1980 (age 46); Breda, Netherlands
- Bats: Right Throws: Right
Medals
Representing Netherlands
Men's baseball
Intercontinental Cup
Silver medal – second place	2006 Taiwan	National team
Silver medal – second place	2010 Taiwan	National team
European Baseball Championship
Gold medal – first place	2005 Czech Republic	National team
Gold medal – first place	2007 Spain	National team

Nick Stuifbergen (born 6 September 1980) is a Dutch former professional baseball pitcher. He played with the Netherlands national baseball team in the 2006 World Baseball Classic (WBC) and other international tournaments. He has also coached and managed in the Netherlands.

== Playing career ==
Stuifbergen debuted with the Dutch national team in the 2005 European Baseball Championship, with a 6.43 earned run average (ERA) in three games. He did not fare much better in the 2006 WBC, with a 5.40 ERA, pitching in the team's losses to Cuba and Puerto Rico. He also pitched in the 2005 and 2007 Baseball World Cups.

Stuifbergen pitched in the Honkbal Hoofdklasse for 13 seasons, debuting with Kinheim in 2001 and also pitching for Amsterdam Pirates and HCAW. Injuries contributed to his career ending in 2013.

== Coaching career ==
In November 2013, Stuifbergen was hired to coach the youth team Scimitars. Stuifbergen became the head coach of DSS Haarlem late in the 2016 season. He again became the team's manager near the end of the 2019 season. He was the pitching coach of the Netherlands national under-18 team in 2018 and 2019.

Stuifbergen was the pitching coach of the men's national team that won the 2025 European championship.

== Personal life ==
Stuuifbergen's younger brother, Tom Stuifbergen, also pitched for the Dutch national team and played in the American minor leagues. The brothers have coached together.

Stuifbergen has worked as a teacher at the Daaf Geluk school in Haarlem, Netherlands.
