= Bas Nooij =

Dutch baseball catcher (born 1987)

- Catcher
- Born: November 26, 1987 (age 38); Amstelveen, Netherlands
- Bats: Right Throws: Right
- Stats at Baseball Reference
Medals
Men's baseball
Representing Netherlands
European Baseball Championship
Silver medal – second place	2010 Germany	National team

Sebastiaan Nooij (born November 26, 1987) is a Dutch former baseball player. He was a catcher for the Netherlands national team in the 2013 World Baseball Classic and other international tournaments and played in the Dutch and Australian leagues.

Nooij began playing in the Honkbal Hoofdklasse, the top Dutch league, for Amsterdam Pirates in 2006. He went to the United States to play college baseball at Lower Columbia College in 2007 and 2008, then Hawaii Pacific University in 2009 and 2010. He also returned to the Netherlands to play baseball in 2009.

Nooij first joined the Netherlands national baseball team as a bullpen catcher during the 2009 World Port Tournament. His first playing appearance was ahead of the 2010 Haarlem Baseball Week. He was a backup catcher for the 2011 Baseball World Cup, batting 0-for-2 over 4 games. He was added to the roster for the 2013 World Baseball Classic after Spencer Kieboom was injured, again posting an 0-for-2 line. He played in the Hoofdklasse for Amsterdam through the 2015 season, then played in the Australian Baseball League through the 2020–21 season.
