= 2020–21 Australian Baseball League season =

Sports tournament

- League: Australian Baseball League
- Sport: Baseball
- Duration: 17 December 2020 – 14 February 2021
- Teams: 6

Regular season
- Season MVP: Darryl George

Championship Series
- Champions: Melbourne Aces (2nd title)
- Runners-up: Perth Heat

Seasons
- ← 2019–20 2021–22 →

The 2020–21 Australian Baseball League season was the eleventh year of the Australian Baseball League (ABL) season. The season was held from 17 December 2020 to 7 February 2021. The Melbourne Aces won their second consecutive title by defeating the Perth Heat in a shortened playoff series.

The league was one of the many sports affected by the COVID-19 pandemic, with its traditional November start pushed back to December, multiple in-season schedule changes, fixtures reduced to 24 games and the withdrawal of Geelong-Korea and Auckland Tuatara for the season.

== Teams ==

On 12 November 2020, the league announced both Geelong-Korea and Auckland Tuatara had pulled out of the season for financial reasons. This breached Auckland's licensing agreement with the ABL and it was given 28 days to address the breach.

The league reverted to a six-team league for the first time since the 2017–18 Australian Baseball League season.

Teams in the ABL
Team	State / Territory/ Country	Stadium
Adelaide Giants	South Australia	Diamond Sports Stadium
Brisbane Bandits	Queensland	Holloway Field
Canberra Cavalry	Australian Capital Territory	Narrabundah Ballpark
Melbourne Aces	Victoria	Melbourne Ballpark
Perth Heat	Western Australia	Baseball Park
Sydney Blue Sox	New South Wales	Baxter Field; Blue Sox Stadium

== Regular season ==
The league had originally planned a staggered 24 game schedule. Both Brisbane and Adelaide were to host week-long 'hubs' starting their season 5 January, later than everyone else, and making up games by playing doubleheaders and mid-week.

Scheduled doubleheaders consist of a seven inning game followed by a nine inning game. The league uses the WBSC tiebreaker rule for all games going beyond the 9th inning, or extra innings beginning less than one hour to a curfew.

Due to a more condensed schedule, roster limits were increased from 22 to 24, with no addition of underage development players.

The ABL roster formation points system was updated to 360 points across 24 games, with non-affiliated overseas players being worth two points, as opposed to four in previous seasons.

The season began with no state border restrictions until the first round of the season was impacted by the pandemic, with an outbreak of cases in Sydney's Northern Beaches effected both Canberra and Sydney unable to host or travel to multiple states. Sydney after playing the first two games of the season, were unable to play due to border restrictions through to 22 January.

The second round between Melbourne and Perth was also interrupted due to the previous cluster spreading to Victoria and impacting Western Australia's border closure on the state. After one game, Perth was flown out to Queensland with Canberra playing the remaining three games of the series. The Heat also replaced Melbourne's January fixtures in Brisbane. Canberra's and Melbourne's schedule was amended to play each other three consecutive rounds as the only logistical option with border closures.

A single COVID case in Queensland on 7 January saw Brisbane's hub that included the Bandits, Heat & Giants end prematurely as all three teams were flown out early to Adelaide as to not be stuck with border closures. Additional fixtures were added to be played in Adelaide to make up for some of these lost games.

Sydney was finally able to resume their season from 22 January against Canberra in Lismore, New South Wales. By playing in regional New South Wales, the Blue Sox did not have to deal with closed state borders, and Canberra did not have to enter a COVID hotspot.

The season was extended out an additional week to allow teams, namely the Blue Sox who had only played two games prior to 22 January, to play at least the benchmark of 14 games to qualify for the postseason.

=== Standings ===
Key
Secured Semi-finals berth
Secured Wild Card berth

Standings
Pos	Team	W	L	Pct.	GB
1	Melbourne Aces	19	9	.679	-
2	Perth Heat	12	9	.571	3.5
3	Adelaide Giants	12	10	.545	4.0
4	Canberra Cavalry	11	14	.440	6.5
5	Sydney Blue Sox	6	8	.429	6.0
6	Brisbane Bandits	8	18	.308	10.0

=== Statistical leaders ===
Batting leaders
Stat	Player (Note: Minimum 2.7 PAs per team game.)	Team	Total
AVG	Delmon Young	Melbourne Aces	.400
HR	Blake Gailen	Melbourne Aces	9
RBI	Darryl George	Melbourne Aces	27
R	Darryl George	Melbourne Aces	21
H	Darryl George	Melbourne Aces	41
SB	Shane Sasaki	Perth Heat	8

Pitching leaders
Stat	Player (Note: Minimum 0.8 IP per team game.)	Team	Total
W	Gunnar Kines	Melbourne Aces	4
L	Tim Atherton	Brisbane Bandits	4
ERA	Nathan Wiles	Perth Heat	1.61
K	Shawn Morimando	Canberra Cavalry	47
IP	Shawn Morimando	Canberra Cavalry	42
SV	Drew Anderson	Melbourne Aces	7

=== Awards ===
Season awards
Award	Player	Team	Ref
Helms Award (MVP)	Darryl George	Melbourne Aces	
Postseason MVP	Tyler Beardsley	Melbourne Aces	
Pitching Champion	Shawn Morimando	Perth Heat	
Hitting Champion	Darryl George	Melbourne Aces	
Reliever of the Year	Aaron Brown	Brisbane Bandits	
Defensive Player of the Year	Manny Rodríguez	Sydney Blue Sox	
Rookie of the Year	Mitch Neunborn; Dermot Fritsch	Perth Heat; Brisbane Bandits	

== Postseason ==
Due to changes in the regular season presented by COVID enforced state border restrictions, the playoff structure was announced mid-season to include five teams. The fourth seed hosted the fifth seed 9 February in an elimination game before the winner joined the other three top seeded teams in a single elimination playoffs 11 & 12 February.

The playoffs were originally scheduled to be a double-elimination playoffs over four days, but the host state Victoria experienced an outbreak of COVID, which forced the playoffs to be shortened to be single elimination over two days due to looming Australian state border closures. This meant a game on 12 February between the Giants and Cavalry was played with the premise of it being the losers bracket of the double elimination playoff, before it was changed to effectively a third place playoff retrospectively.

Wild Card
4	Canberra Cavalry	3
5	Sydney Blue Sox	2

Semi-finals
1	Melbourne Aces	19
WC	Canberra Cavalry	4
2	Perth Heat	26
3	Adelaide Giants	6

Championship
W1	Melbourne Aces	9
W2	Perth Heat	2
Third place
L2	Adelaide Giants	2
L1	Canberra Cavalry	3
