= Arshwin Asjes =

Dutch baseball player (born 1985)

- Pitcher
- Born: 19 September 1985 (age 41); Willemstad, Curaçao
- Bats: Right Throws: Right
- Stats at Baseball Reference
Medals
Men's baseball
Representing Netherlands
Baseball World Cup
Gold medal – first place	2011 Panama City	National team
European Baseball Championship
Gold medal – first place	2014 Brno	National team
Silver medal – second place	2010 Germany	National team
France International Baseball Tournament
Gold medal – first place	2014 Sénart	National team

Arshwin G. Asjes (born 19 September 1985 in Willemstad, Curaçao) is a Curaçaoan former baseball player who played for the Netherlands national team, winning the 2011 Baseball World Cup as well as playing in other tournaments. He pitched in college baseball for the Temple Owls.

== Playing career ==
Asjes attended Cheverus High School in Portland, Maine. He then played college baseball at Rowan College of South Jersey. He was selected by the Cleveland Indians in the 34th round of the 2005 MLB draft. He chose to transfer to play collegiately for the Temple Owls. In 2006, he was named Temple's outstanding pitcher and was an all-Philadelphia Big 5 selection. After the 2006 season, he played collegiate summer baseball with the Harwich Mariners of the Cape Cod Baseball League, striking out 18 in 15 innings pitched. In 2008, Asjes had a school record 10 saves.

Asjes began his professional career with the Midwest Sliders of the Frontier League in 2009. He signed with the Cincinnati Reds after the season but did not pitch in affiliated baseball. He then played in the Honkbal Hoofdklasse in the Netherlands from 2010 to 2015. His best season came in 2014, when he went 5–0 with nine saves and a 1.72 earned run average.

== International career ==
Asjes played for the Netherlands national team at the 2009 Baseball World Cup, 2011 Baseball World Cup, 2014 France International Baseball Tournament, and 2014 European Baseball Championship.
