= Bryan Engelhardt =

Dutch baseball player (born 1982)

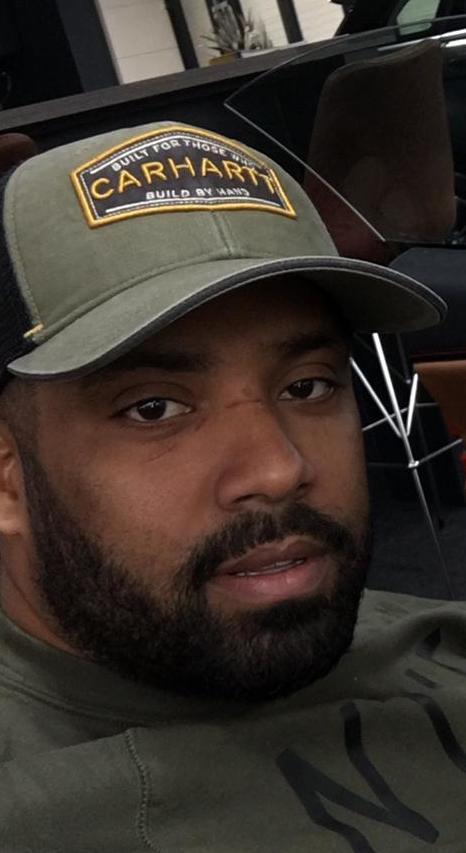
- Outfielder
- Born: 10 January 1982 (age 44); Willemstad, Curaçao, Netherlands Antilles
- Bats: Left Throws: Left
Medals
Men's baseball
Representing Netherlands
Baseball World Cup
Gold medal – first place	2011 Panama	National team
Intercontinental Cup
Silver medal – second place	2006 Taiwan	National team
Silver medal – second place	2010 Taiwan	National team
European Baseball Championship
Gold medal – first place	2003 Netherlands	National team
Silver medal – second place	2010 Germany	National team

Bryan Stanley Tjark Engelhardt (born 10 January 1982 in Willemstad, Curaçao) is a Dutch former baseball player for the Netherlands national team who played in the 2008 Summer Olympics, 2009 World Baseball Classic, and other international tournaments. He also played in the Honkbal Hoofdklasse for more than two decades. After his career, he became a sports agent.

== Playing career ==
=== Baltimore Orioles ===
Engelhardt signed with the Baltimore Orioles on July 2, 1998 by scout Jesus "Chu" Halabi, who had signed several other players from the Netherlands Antilles. However, Engelhardt hit .170 in the Venezuelan Summer League in 1999, his only season in affiliated baseball.

=== Netherlands national team ===
Engelhardt made his debut with the Netherlands national team at the 2002 Haarlem Baseball Week, where he won the most valuable player (MVP) award. That year he also received the country's Guus van der Heijden Memorial Trophy as the best player under the age of 23.

Engelhardt was dropped from the Netherlands team shortly before the 2004 Summer Olympics and 2006 World Baseball Classic (WBC). He did star in other tournaments, leading the 2003 European Baseball Championship in runs batted in (RBI) as he was named to its All-Star team and being named the MVP of the 2006 Haarlem Baseball Week.

Manager Robert Eenhoorn selected Englehardt for the Dutch national team at the 2008 Summer Olympics in Beijing, where they finished in 7th place. He hit .278 with two of the team's five home runs in the Olympics. He was on the Netherlands for the 2009 WBC, batting .294 with a home run in six games. His home run off Matt Lindstrom of the United States was the country's first home run in a WBC game. Engelhardt was also on the Dutch team that won the 2011 Baseball World Cup, leading the team in home runs, doubles, RBI, and runs scored.

Engelhardt played in more than 180 games for the national team, returning to the team in 2019.

=== Honkbal Hoofdklasse ===
Engelhardt played in the Dutch Honkbal Hoofdklasse, beginning in 2000 with PSV until 2021 with Quick Amersfoort. During his career, he also played multiple seasons with BSC Almere and Kinheim. He hit a home run in his first Hoofdklasse at bat. He won the league's MVP award in 2010 with Kinheim. He led the league in home runs nine times from 2004 to 2019. He also served as Amersfoort's hitting coach at the end of his career.

== Post-playing career ==
Engelhardt has also played for the Netherlands national men's and co-ed slow-pitch softball teams.

After his playing career, Engelhardt became a sports agent in Curaçao.

== Personal life ==
Engelhardt's father coached him in several seasons. His younger brother, Rachid, also signed with the Orioles and played in the Hoofdklasse.
