= Gene Kingsale =

Dutch-Aruban baseball player (born 1976)

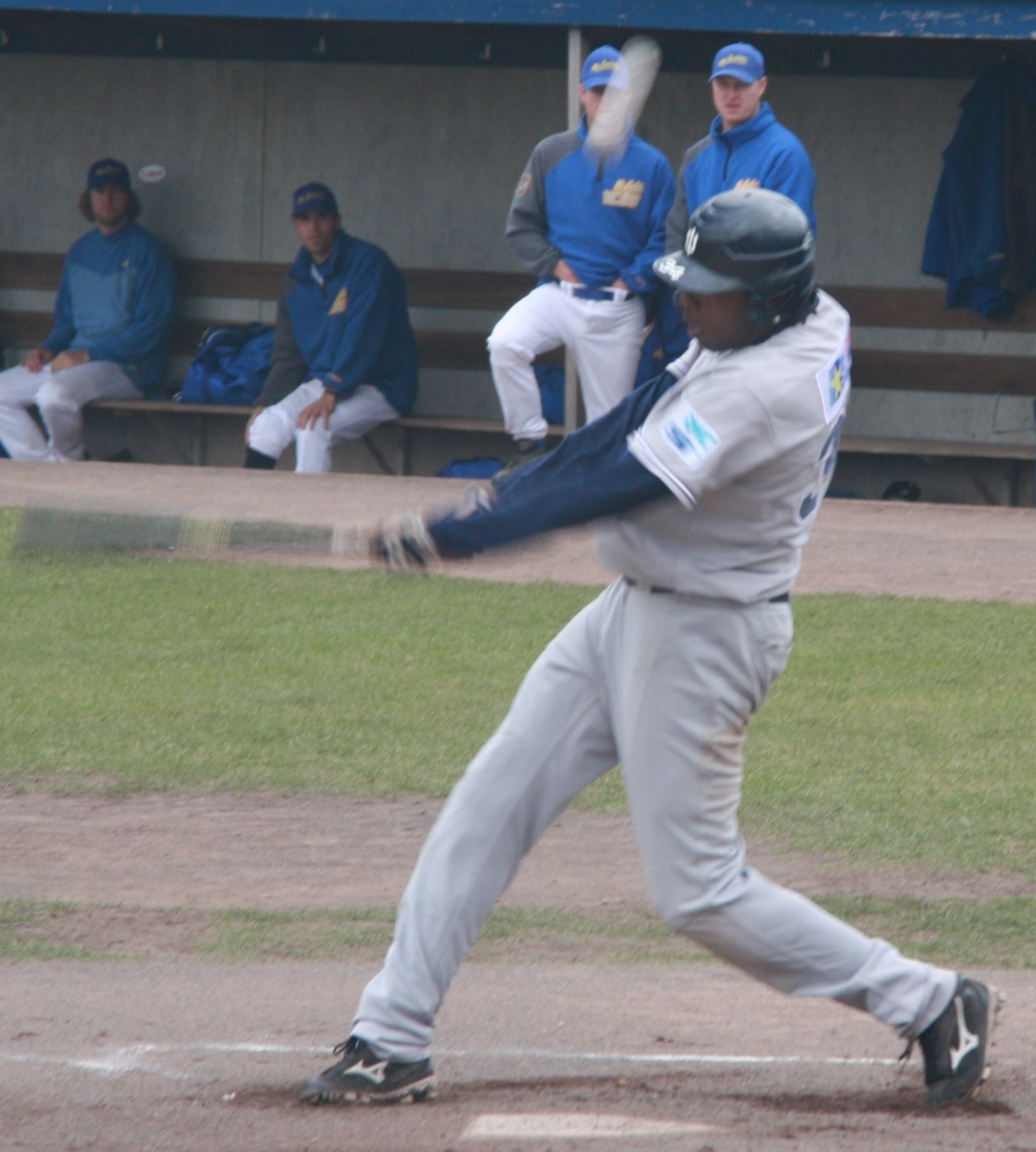
- Kingsale with Neptunus in 2009
- Outfielder
- Born: August 20, 1976 (age 50); Solito, Aruba
- Batted: Switch Threw: Right

MLB debut
- September 3, 1996, for the Baltimore Orioles

Last MLB appearance
- June 8, 2003, for the Detroit Tigers

MLB statistics
- Batting average: .251
- Home runs: 3
- Runs batted in: 53
- Stats at Baseball Reference

Teams
- Baltimore Orioles (1996, 1998–2001); Seattle Mariners (2001–2002); San Diego Padres (2002); Detroit Tigers (2003)
Medals
Men's baseball
Representing Netherlands
Intercontinental Cup
Silver medal – second place	2010 Taichung	National team
Silver medal – second place	2006 Taiwan	National team
European Baseball Championship
Silver medal – second place	2010 Germany	National team

Eugene Humphrey Kingsale (born August 20, 1976) is a Dutch-Aruban former Major League Baseball player with the Baltimore Orioles, Seattle Mariners, San Diego Padres, and Detroit Tigers from 1996 until 2003. He is currently a baseball coach in the Texas Rangers organization.

In 2003, he was decorated as a Knight in the Order of Orange-Nassau, along with fellow Aruban former Orioles players Sidney Ponson and Calvin Maduro.

Following his time playing in the United States, Kingsale played extensively for the Netherlands national team in international competitions, including the Baseball World Cup, the 2004 and 2008 Summer Olympics, and World Baseball Classic (WBC) tournaments in 2006 and 2009. He played for perennial champions Neptunus in the top Dutch league, the Honkbal Hoofdklasse, from 2008 to 2011.

== Playing career ==
Kingsale was signed by the Baltimore Orioles as an amateur free agent on June 19, 1993. He made his MLB debut with the Orioles on September 3, 1996 as a defensive replacement, becoming the first Aruban to play in the major leagues. In the first inning of his 1997 minor league season, he injured his right knee sliding into third base. He returned to the majors briefly in 1998 as a defensive replacement and pinch runner. He got his first major league hit in 1999, a double off C. J. Nitkowski on August 29. He hit a single and stole a base off Hall of Famer Pedro Martinez on September 27.

On July 10, 2001, he was selected off waivers by the Seattle Mariners. He returned to the majors in September and played in 10 games. He played in two games for Seattle in June 2002. On June 14, he was selected off waivers by the San Diego Padres. He played in 89 games for the Padres, his most consistent playing time in MLB. He batted 2-for-5 and scored twice in an 18–2 win over the Florida Marlins on August 23, the franchise's largest margin of victory until May 2025.

On November 15, 2002, Kingsale was traded to the Detroit Tigers for Mike Rivera and was the Tigers' opening day center fielder. He started regularly for the first month of the 2003 season, batting .241 with no extra base hits through April 25. He played his final MLB game on June 8, batting 0-for-3 but driving in two runs. On September 29, he was granted free agency. He signed with San Diego on November 9 but was released on May 10, 2004.

He returned to the Orioles organization on June 1, 2004 and played in their minor league system in 2004 and 2005.

After his American career, Kingsale played in the Dutch Honkbal Hoofdklasse for Almere '90 in 2006 and 2007, then Neptunus from 2008 to 2011. He tore a tendon in his knee in while running to first base in a game in 2007. He retired in early 2012.

== Career statistics ==
In seven major league seasons, Kingsale played in 211 games with 533 career at bats. He scored 65 runs, had 134 hits with three home runs and 53 RBI. He had a career .251 batting average and 15 stolen bases.

== International career ==
Kingsale played for the Netherlands national team in international competitions. He led his team with a .346/.414/.654 slash line at the 2004 Summer Olympics. He homered in a loss to Chinese Taipei. At the 2008 Olympics, he batted 1-for-17.

He batted 1-for-8 in the 2006 World Baseball Classic (WBC). In the first round of the 2009 WBC, Kingsale drove in the tying run and scored the winning run in the 11th inning to lead the Netherlands to a 2–1 win over the Dominican Republic.

Kingsale was the first base coach for the Netherlands in the 2023 WBC, as the team went 2–2 and did not advance out of Pool A. The team's performance did earn it automatic qualification for the 2026 tournament.

== Coaching career ==
Kingsale has coached in the Texas Rangers organization since 2023, serving as hitting coach for Dominican Summer League Rangers team in 2024.

Internationally, he has coached youth in Aruba and had various roles on Netherlands national teams. He was first base coach for the Netherlands' 2023 WBC team. He was named the most talented coach in 2018 by the Royal Netherlands Baseball and Softball Federation after coaching the national under-23 team.
