= BSC Almere =

Dutch baseball team

BSC Almere is a baseball club based in Almere, the Netherlands. The club consists of roughly 300 members and fields 20 teams that participate in KNBSB-sanctioned competitions.

The club was originally established in 1982 under the name Polmerians. In 1990, the organization renamed itself BSC Almere’90 to coincide with its relocation to its current field at Fanny Blankers Koen Sportpark. Prior to 2010, Almere'90 participated regularly in the Honkbal Hoofdklasse, the Netherlands' top baseball league.
