= World Port Tournament =

Baseball tournament held in Rotterdam (1985 – 2019)

Tournament information
- Sport: Baseball
- Location: Rotterdam, the Netherlands
- Established: 1984
- Final year: 2019
- Teams: 5
- Most championships: Cuba (10)
- Website: worldporttournament.nl

Final champion
- Netherlands (2019)

The World Port Tournament was an international baseball tournament held at the Neptunus Familiestadion in Rotterdam, Netherlands. The tournament was held every two years in odd-numbered years (2005 excluded) since 1985, alternating with the Haarlem Baseball Week. The last edition of the tournament was held in 2019, with subsequent editions cancelled.

The tournament was created by Bram Peper, who was asked by Cuban Dr. Oscar Ferdinand Mell to organize an international baseball tournament featuring baseball teams from all over the world in Rotterdam. The Netherlands national team competed frequently in the tournament, while semi-professional teams from the United States and other countries competed in early editions of the tournament. Hall of Famer Bert Blyleven competed in the 1993 tournament, won by a team of mostly American minor league players. The tournament used the organist and mascot from the minor-league Wilmington Blue Rocks in 1999. The Netherlands won the most recent edition of the tournament.

== Results ==
Year	Final		3rd/4th place	
Year	Champions	Runners-up	3rd place	4th place
1985	(Cuba); Habana	(Japan); Kobe	(United States); Dallas	Netherlands
1987	(Cuba); Habana	Chinese Taipei	Netherlands	(Japan); Osaka
1989	Netherlands	(United States); Baltimore	(Cuba); Habana	Chinese Taipei
1991	(United States); Baltimore	Canada	(Cuba); Habana	Curaçao
1993	(United States); MLB All-Stars	Red Machine	Netherlands	Canada
1995	(Cuba); Habana	Netherlands	Red Machine	(South Korea); Hyundai Phoenix
1997	Cuba	Netherlands	Chinese Taipei	(United States); Baltimore Corrigans
1999	Netherlands	Cuba	(United States); Grand Rapids Sullivans	Chinese Taipei
2001	Cuba	Netherlands	Italy	Chinese Taipei
2003	Cuba	Netherlands	Chinese Taipei	(United States); Eastern Connecticut
2007; Details	Cuba	Chinese Taipei	United States	Netherlands
2009; Details	Cuba	Netherlands	Chinese Taipei	Japan
2011; Details	Chinese Taipei	Cuba	Netherlands	Curaçao
2013; Details	Cuba	Netherlands	Chinese Taipei	Curaçao
2015; Details	Cuba	Netherlands	Curaçao	Japan
2017; Details	Chinese Taipei	Japan	Curaçao	Netherlands
2019; Details	Netherlands	Japan	Chinese Taipei	North America

== Medal table ==
Rank	Nation	Gold	Silver	Bronze	Total
1	Cuba	10	2	2	14
2	Netherlands	3	7	3	13
3	Chinese Taipei^{1}	2	2	5	9
4	United States	2	1	3	6
5	Japan	0	3	0	3
6	Aruba	0	1	1	2
7	Canada	0	1	0	1
8	Curaçao	0	0	2	2
9	Italy	0	0	1	1
Totals (9 entries)		17	17	17	51

- ^1 Chinese Taipei is the official WBSC designation for the team representing the state officially referred to as the Republic of China, more commonly known as Taiwan. (See also political status of Taiwan for details.)

== See also ==
- Baseball in the Netherlands
