= Sparta Rotterdam (baseball) =

Defunct Dutch baseball team (1942–2012)

Sparta-Feyenoord
- Logo

Information
- League: Honkbal Hoofdklasse
- Location: Rotterdam, the Netherlands
- Founded: 1942
- Holland Series championships: 1963, 1964, 1966, 1967, 1969, 1971, 1972, 1973, 1974
- Website: website (archived)

Sparta Rotterdam was a professional baseball team that played in Honkbal Hoofdklasse, the top professional baseball league in the Netherlands. Originally the baseball section of Dutch association football club Sparta Rotterdam, the club merged with Feyenoord's baseball section to form HSV Sparta-Feyenoord in 1997. Like the football club, the team's colors were red and white.

The club was very successful in the 1960s and 1970s, winning 9 Dutch national championships, including the first two Holland Series. Facing significant debts and relegation from the Hoofdklasse after the 2012 season, the club folded.

== History ==
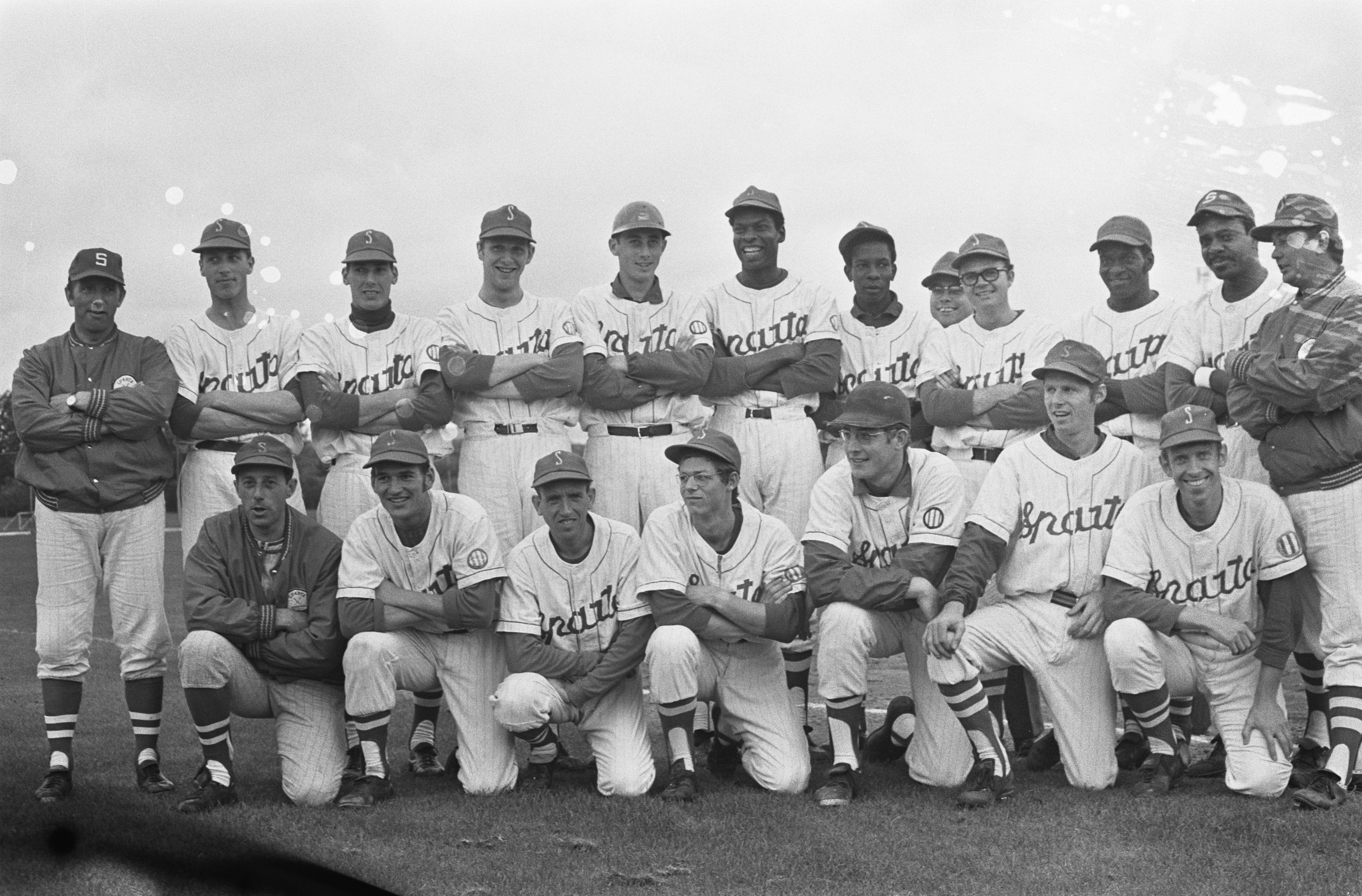
Sparta's 1969 championship team

Sparta Rotterdam formed a baseball club in 1942. It earned its first promotion to the Dutch first division in 1953, under player-manager John Heyt. He led the team to its first pennant in 1963, becoming the first club from outside Amsterdam or Haarlem to capture the Dutch championship title. During this period, Sparta was powered by four players from the Netherlands Antilles (Simon Arrindell, José Faneyte, Hamilton Richardson (baseball player), and Hudson John). Sparta also won titles under Heyt in 1964, 1966, and 1967.

Hey died in a tragic automobile accident on New Year's Day 1968, and was replaced as managed by third baseman Henk Hendriks. Sparta captured its fifth title in 1969. Arrindell and John left the team in 1970 and an injury sidelined Richardson for the rest of the season. But the team won another championship in 1971. It repeated in 1972, the first year the Hoofdklasse implemented a playoff system with the Holland Series, defeating Haarlem Nicols. Under managers Jan van Tol and Cees Herkemij, Sparta won four consecutive titles and three consecutive Holland Series in the 1970s, from 1971 to 1974. The team declined in the performance in the latter half of the 1970s and was briefly relegated before returning to the Hoofdklasse in 1981, under Richardson, now managing the team.

=== Sparta/Feyenoord ===
Association football club Feyenoord had established its own baseball section in 1954, with many of its first crop of players being footballers. The club, initially playing in the lower division, earned its first promotion to the Hoofdklasse in 1968; Feyenoord's ascension ushered in the first baseball meeting between Sparta and Feyenoord, two rivals that contest the Rotterdam derby in football. Feyenoord baseball split off from the main club in 1983.

In 1996, Sparta was forced to relocate from its playing grounds at Nieuw Vreelust due to the expansion of the Rotterdam Metro. Sparta approached Feyenoord with the suggestion of merging the two rivals, which was ultimately approved in 1997. The combined club did not win any championships and folded after the 2012 season.
