= 2016 Haarlem Baseball Week =

Tournament details
- Country: Netherlands
- City: Haarlem
- Dates: 15–24 July
- Teams: 5

Final positions
- Champions: Netherlands (4th title)
- Runners-up: Japan
- Third place: Australia
- Fourth place: Chinese Taipei

Tournament statistics
- Games played: 17
- Attendance: 34,300 (2,018 per game)

Awards
- MVP: (Japan) Ryoya Kaneko

The 2016 Haarlem Baseball Week was an international baseball competition held at the Pim Mulier Stadium in Haarlem, the Netherlands from 15–24 July 2016. It was the 28th edition of the tournament.

In the final the Netherlands won over Japan, becoming champions for the fourth time.

For the first time in the history of the Haarlem Baseball Week a youth tournament was organised as well, called the Honkbalweek Haarlem Cup.

== Teams ==
Originally, six teams were invited to the tournament. However, the team from the United States had to withdraw because of sponsor obligations. The organisation was not able to find a replacement team, leaving five participating teams.

| Australia | 4th appearance |
| Chinese Taipei^{1} | 9th appearance |
| Curaçao | 1st appearance^{2} |
| Japan | 14th appearance |
| Netherlands | Host nation |

^1 Chinese Taipei is the official IBAF designation for the team representing Taiwan.
^2 Players from Curaçao previously competed at the Haarlem Baseball Week as part of the Dutch Caribbean team.

== Group stage ==
=== Standings ===
| Teams | W | L | Pct. | GB | PTS | R | RA |
|---|---|---|---|---|---|---|---|
| Netherlands | 4 | 0 | 1.000 | — | 8 | 28 | 6 |
| Australia | 3 | 1 | .750 | 1 | 6 | 23 | 19 |
| Japan | 2 | 2 | .500 | 2 | 4 | 17 | 12 |
| Chinese Taipei | 1 | 3 | .250 | 3 | 2 | 12 | 18 |
| Curaçao | 0 | 4 | .000 | 4 | 0 | 6 | 31 |
Source: "Uitslagen en stats". Honkbalweek Haarlems.

=== Game results ===
| 15 July 2016 | Curaçao | 1 – 10 | Japan | Pim Mulier Stadium, Haarlem; Attendance: 850 |
| 15 July 2016 | | Boxscore | | Pim Mulier Stadium, Haarlem; Attendance: 850 |

| 16 July 2016 | Australia | 9 – 5 | Chinese Taipei | Pim Mulier Stadium, Haarlem; Attendance: 2,600 |
| 16 July 2016 | | Boxscore | | Pim Mulier Stadium, Haarlem; Attendance: 2,600 |

| 16 July 2016 | Netherlands | 6 – 1 | Curaçao | Pim Mulier Stadium, Haarlem; Attendance: 3,200 |
| 16 July 2016 | | Boxscore | | Pim Mulier Stadium, Haarlem; Attendance: 3,200 |

| 17 July 2016 | Chinese Taipei | 0 – 8 | Netherlands | Pim Mulier Stadium, Haarlem; Attendance: 3,100 |
| 17 July 2016 | | Boxscore | | Pim Mulier Stadium, Haarlem; Attendance: 3,100 |

| 17 July 2016 | Japan | 3 – 4 | Australia | Pim Mulier Stadium, Haarlem; Attendance: 2,100 |
| 17 July 2016 | | Boxscore | | Pim Mulier Stadium, Haarlem; Attendance: 2,100 |

| 18 July 2016 | Curaçao | 4 – 8 | Australia | Pim Mulier Stadium, Haarlem; Attendance: 1,100 |
| 18 July 2016 | | Boxscore | | Pim Mulier Stadium, Haarlem; Attendance: 1,100 |

| 19 July 2016 | Chinese Taipei | 7 – 0 | Curaçao | Pim Mulier Stadium, Haarlem; Attendance: 1,300 |
| 19 July 2016 | | Boxscore | | Pim Mulier Stadium, Haarlem; Attendance: 1,300 |

| 19 July 2016 | Netherlands | 7 – 3 | Japan | Pim Mulier Stadium, Haarlem; Attendance: 3,150 |
| 19 July 2016 | | Boxscore | | Pim Mulier Stadium, Haarlem; Attendance: 3,150 |

| 20 July 2016 | Japan | 1 – 0 | Chinese Taipei | Pim Mulier Stadium, Haarlem; Attendance: 900 |
| 20 July 2016 | | Boxscore | | Pim Mulier Stadium, Haarlem; Attendance: 900 |

| 20 July 2016 | Australia | 2 – 7 | Netherlands | Pim Mulier Stadium, Haarlem; Attendance: 3,100 |
| 20 July 2016 | | Boxscore | | Pim Mulier Stadium, Haarlem; Attendance: 3,100 |

== Knock-out phase ==
| 21 July 2016 | Japan | 2 – 1 | Chinese Taipei | Pim Mulier Stadium, Haarlem; Attendance: 850 |
| 21 July 2016 | | Boxscore | | Pim Mulier Stadium, Haarlem; Attendance: 850 |

| 21 July 2016 | Netherlands | 9 – 0 | Australia | Pim Mulier Stadium, Haarlem; Attendance: 1,900 |
| 21 July 2016 | | Boxscore | | Pim Mulier Stadium, Haarlem; Attendance: 1,900 |

| 22 July 2016 | Australia | 8 – 7 | Curaçao | Pim Mulier Stadium, Haarlem; Attendance: 850 |
| 22 July 2016 | | Boxscore | | Pim Mulier Stadium, Haarlem; Attendance: 850 |

| 22 July 2016 | Netherlands | 3 – 0 | Japan | Pim Mulier Stadium, Haarlem; Attendance: 2,000 |
| 22 July 2016 | | Boxscore | | Pim Mulier Stadium, Haarlem; Attendance: 2,000 |

| 23 July 2016 | Chinese Taipei | 5 – 4 | Curaçao | Pim Mulier Stadium, Haarlem; Attendance: 1,800 |
| 23 July 2016 | | Boxscore | | Pim Mulier Stadium, Haarlem; Attendance: 1,800 |

| 23 July 2016 | Australia | 4 – 9 | Japan | Pim Mulier Stadium, Haarlem; Attendance: 2,300 |
| 23 July 2016 | | Boxscore | | Pim Mulier Stadium, Haarlem; Attendance: 2,300 |

== Final ==
| 24 July 2016 | Netherlands | 2 – 0 | Japan | Pim Mulier Stadium, Haarlem; Attendance: 3,200 |
| 24 July 2016 | | Boxscore | | Pim Mulier Stadium, Haarlem; Attendance: 3,200 |

== Final standings ==
| Rk | Team |
|---|---|
| 1 | Netherlands |
| 2 | Japan |
| 3 | Australia |
| 4 | Chinese Taipei |
| 5 | Curaçao |

2016 Haarlem Baseball Week champions

Netherlands
4th title

== Tournament awards ==
| Award | Player |
|---|---|
| Homerun King | (Japan) Tatsuhiko Satoh (2) |
| Most Popular Player | (Australia) Trent Oeltjen |
| Press Award | (Australia) Jim Colborn |
| Best Defensive Player | (Chinese Taipei) Yu Ning Tsao (1.000 FLD%) |
| Best Hitter | (Japan) Ryoya Kaneko (.448) |
| Best Pitcher | (Japan) Takuya Kato (0.00 ERA in 13 innings) |
| Most Valuable Player | (Japan) Ryoya Kaneko (13 hits, 7 RBIs) |
