= Haarlem Baseball Week =

Baseball tournament in the Netherlands (founded in 1961)

Honkbalweek Haalem

Tournament information
- Sport: Baseball
- Location: Haarlem, Netherlands
- Month played: July–August
- Established: 1961
- Format: Round robin then single elimination
- Venue: Pim Mulier Stadium
- Teams: 6 (Finals)
- Most championships: (United States) Sullivans (6)
- Website: Honkbalweek.nl

Current champion
- Italy

The Haarlem Baseball Week (Dutch: Honkbalweek Haarlem, before 2016 known as Haarlemse Honkbalweek) is an international invitation baseball tournament at the Pim Mulier Stadium in Haarlem, Netherlands. It was first held in 1961 and has been held every other year in even-numbered years since 1972, except for 2020.

== History ==
The tournament has faced financial and other troubles but remains ongoing. In 2001, the Royal Netherlands Baseball and Softball Federation proposed not sending the Netherlands national team to the event due to a disagreement with organizers over sharing profits from the event, but eventually the parties reached a new agreement. In December 2016, months after the 28th edition of the event, event organizers announced the tournament would end, due to financial problems. A workgroup was formed to find sponsors in order to realise a relaunch, which succeeded after several companies and the municipality of Haarlem guaranteed an amount that would cover the costs of at least three more events. The 2020 edition of the tournament was cancelled due to the COVID-19 pandemic, but the tournament resumed in 2022. A similar biannual baseball tournament in nearby Rotterdam, the World Port Tournament, was last held in 2019.

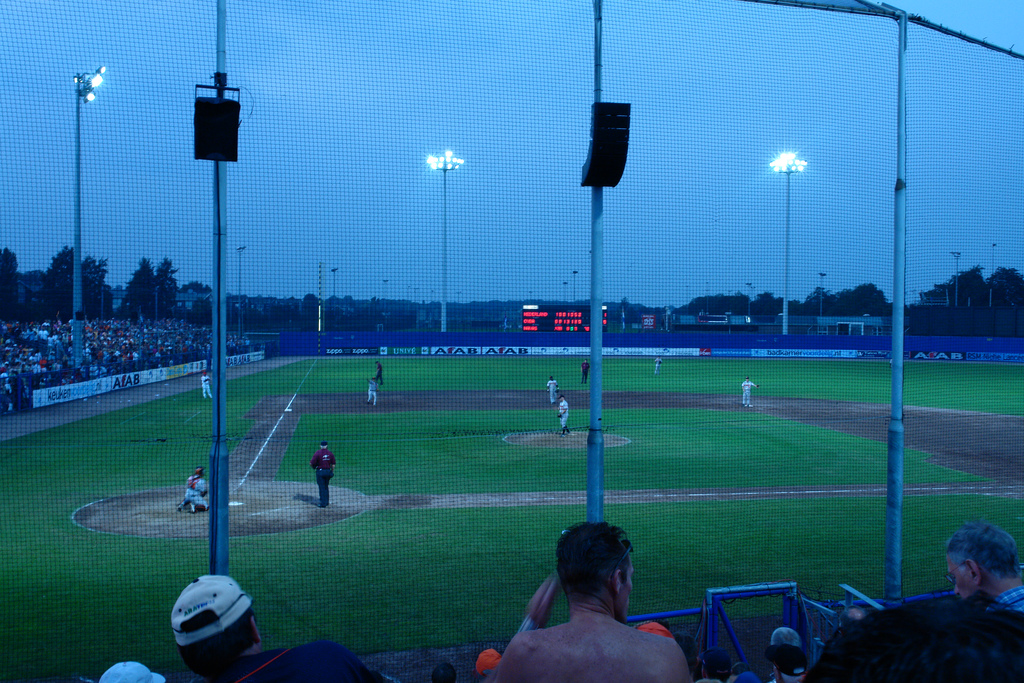
Pim Mulier Stadium during the 2006 tournament.

Teams from the United States have won the most tournaments, though most of them were semi-professional and amateur teams, not the U.S. national team. The Sullivans, an amateur team from Grand Rapids, Michigan run by a local furniture store owner and baseball scout, won six titles, the most of any team. In Haarlem, the Sullivans regularly featured pitcher Carl Angelo, who first pitched in the tournament in 1963 and became the oldest player to play in the tournament in 1996, at the age of 64. The Sullivans team was renamed for part of the 1990s due to a sponsorship from Michigan-based Little Caesars restaurants. Two American college teams, the Arizona Wildcats and Miami Hurricanes, have also won the tournament. Among national teams, the U.S., the Netherlands, Cuba, and Japan have all won five tournaments.

Since the tournament occurs in the summer, the U.S. has sent its collegiate national team to the event. Many college players who played in the tournament have later played in Major League Baseball, including Dave Winfield, Paul Skenes, Kris Bryant, and Trea Turner.

== Results ==
Year	Medalists		
Year	Champions	Runners-up	3rd place
1961	(United Kingdom); Alconbury Spartans	(West Germany); Wiesbaden Flyers	(France); Châteauroux Sabres
1963	(United States); Sullivans	Netherlands	(United States); French Woods
1966	(United States); California Stags	Netherlands	(West Germany); Augsburg Bayonets
1968	(United States); Sullivans	Netherlands	Netherlands Antilles
1969	(United States); Sullivans	(United States); California Stags	Netherlands
1971	(United States); Sullivans	(United States); California Stags	(United States); USAFE
1972; Pool A	Cuba	(United States); Sullivans	(United States); Alaska Goldpanners
1972; Pool B	Netherlands Antilles	Netherlands	Italy
1974	Cuba	(United States); Arizona Wildcats	(United States); Sullivans
1976	(United States); Arizona Wildcats	South Korea	(United States); Sullivans
1978	Japan	South Korea	Cuba
1980	United States	(United States); Mississippi Rebels	(United States); Sullivans
1982	(United States); Miami Hurricanes	Mitsubishi Japan	Netherlands
1984	Canada	Netherlands	(United States); Washington State Cougars
1988	(United States); Sullivans	Canada	Netherlands
1990	(United States); Sullivans	Cuba	Netherlands
1992	Japan	(United States); Little Caesars (Sullivans)	Netherlands
1994	Japan	(United States); Little Caesars (Sullivans)	Netherlands
1996	Cuba	Netherlands	(United States); Sullivans
1998	Cuba	Australia	(United States); Sullivans
2000	United States	Cuba	Netherlands
2002; Details	United States	Netherlands	Cuba
2004; Details	Netherlands	Cuba	Japan
2006; Details	Netherlands	Cuba	United States
2008; Details	United States	Cuba	Chinese Taipei
2010; Details	Netherlands	Cuba	Japan
2012; Details	Cuba	Puerto Rico	United States
2014; Details	United States	Japan	Netherlands
2016; Details	Netherlands	Japan	Australia
2018; Details	Japan	Chinese Taipei	Netherlands
2022; Details	Netherlands	Curaçao	United States
2024; Details	Japan	United States	Netherlands
2026; Details	Italy	Netherlands	Chinese Taipei

== Medal table ==
Rank	Nation	Gold	Silver	Bronze	Total
1	United States (USA)	14	8	12	34
2	Netherlands (NED)	5	9	10	24
3	Cuba (CUB)	5	6	2	13
4	Japan (JPN)	5	3	2	10
5	Italy (ITA)	2	0	1	3
6	Canada (CAN)	1	1	0	2
7	Netherlands Antilles (AHO)	1	0	1	2
8	Great Britain (GBR)	1	0	0	1
9	South Korea (KOR)	0	2	0	2
10	Chinese Taipei (TPE)	0	1	3	4
11	Australia (AUS)	0	1	1	2
11	Germany (GER)	0	1	1	2
13	Curaçao (CUW)	0	1	0	1
13	Puerto Rico (PUR)	0	1	0	1
15	France (FRA)	0	0	1	1

== Tournament awards ==
- Most valuable player, named after Jacques Reuvers
- Best hitter
- Best pitcher
- Home run king
- Most popular player, named after Carl Angelo

Previously awarded:

- Best defensive player
- Press award, given to a team manager

== See also ==
- World Port Tournament
- Baseball awards § World
- Baseball in the Netherlands
- Haarlem Basketball Week
