= Noah Zavolas =

American baseball player (born 1996)

Hoofddoorp Pioniers – No. 13
- Pitcher
- Born: May 11, 1996 (age 30); Beverly, Massachusetts, U.S.
- Bats: Right Throws: Right

Noah Zavolas (born May 11, 1996) is an American professional baseball pitcher for Kinheim of the Honkbal Hoofdklasse. He pitched in Minor League Baseball for several years after attending Harvard University. He has pitched and coached for Greece's national baseball team.

== Amateur career ==
Zavolas attended Acton-Boxborough Regional High School in Acton, Massachusetts. He enrolled at Harvard University and played college baseball for the Harvard Crimson. In 2018, he was the Ivy League Pitcher of the Year. He was named the NCAA Player of the Week after throwing a no-hitter against Yale on April 15.

During the summer of 2016, Zavolas pitched for the Charlestown Townies in the Yawkey League and was on the playoff roster for the Wareham Gatemen of the Cape Cod Baseball League. He pitched full-time for Wareham the following summer.

== Professional career ==
=== Seattle Mariners ===
The Seattle Mariners selected Zavolas in the 18th round of the 2018 Major League Baseball draft. He made his professional debut that June with the Modesto Nuts and was promoted to the Everett AquaSox during the season. In 19 relief appearances between the two clubs, he went 5–2 with a 3.03 ERA, allowing 1.09 walks and hits per inning.

=== Milwaukee Brewers ===
On December 21, 2018, the Mariners traded Zavolas and outfielder Ben Gamel to the Milwaukee Brewers for outfielder Domingo Santana.

Zavolas spent 2019 with the Carolina Mudcats, going 6–5 with a 2.98 ERA over 22 starts, striking out 102 over 133 innings. He was named the Carolina League Pitcher of the Year. He did not play a minor league game in 2020 due to the cancellation of the minor league season caused by the COVID-19 pandemic. Zavolas spent the 2021 season with the Biloxi Shuckers, starting a Southern League-leading 22 games and going 5–7 with a 4.40 ERA. He returned to the Shuckers in 2022, starting 11 games and posting a 2–2 record with a 6.57 ERA. The Brewers released Zavolas on August 31.

=== York Revolution ===
On April 3, 2023, Zavolas signed with the York Revolution of the Atlantic League of Professional Baseball. He did not appear in a game for York and became a free agent after the season.

=== Regensburg Legionäre ===
Zavolas pitched for German team Regensburg Legionäre in 2024, including in the European Champions Cup.

=== Hoofddoorp Pioniers ===
On April 29, 2025, Zavolas joined the Hoofddoorp Pioniers of the Dutch Honkbal Hoofdklasse. On May 26, he pitched the first six innings in a combined 7-inning no-hitter over UVV. The game ended early due to the mercy rule, with Pioniers winning 18–0. Zavolas posted an 8–3 record with a 2.06 ERA in 13 starts, ranking in the top 10 in the league in several categories.

=== Kinheim ===
On November 17, 2025, Zavolas joined Kinheim of the Honkbal Hoofdklasse.

== International career ==
Zavolas has worked to improve the Greek national baseball team. He was a coach for the team at the 2023 European Championship. After becoming a Greek citizen in 2024, he pitched for the team in the 2024 Prague Baseball Week tournament, earning a win over Slovakia.

Zavolas pitched for Greece in the 2025 European Championship, earning a win in a start against Lithuania on September 23. He had 21 strikeouts in the tournament, tied for the most with Kevin Kelly.

== Personal life ==
Zavolas earned a psychology degree in from Harvard.
