= Profar =

Profar is a surname. Notable people with the surname include:

- Juremi Profar (born 1996), Dutch-Curaçaoan baseball player
- Jurickson Profar (born 1993), Curaçaoan baseball player
