= Baseball in Switzerland =

- Country: Switzerland
- Governing body: Swiss Baseball and Softball Federation
- National teams: Men's national team; Women's national team
- First played: 1981
- Clubs: Championnat de Suisse de baseball

International competitions
- European Baseball Championship

Baseball is a minor sport in Switzerland.

== History ==
The first baseball game in Switzerland was played in December 1980, though that game ended early due to snow.

The governing body for baseball in the country is the Swiss Baseball and Softball Federation (SBSF), which is based in Therwil. Championnat de Suisse de baseball is the national professional baseball league (NLA and NLB). The Swiss men's national team first reached the European Baseball Championship in 2023 and has finished out of the top 10 in both appearances.

One player born in Switzerland has played in Major League Baseball. Pitcher Otto Hess was born in Bern in 1888 and moved to the United States when he was 10 years old. He led the American League in wild pitches in 1905 and tied for the lead in hit batters in 1906.

== Teams ==
The top three divisions in Swiss baseball are the NLA, NLB and 1. Liga. As of December 2025, there were four teams in the NLA, 10 in the NLB, and 17 in the 1. Liga. This includes lower teams of several clubs.

=== NLA ===
- Lucerne Eagles (Lucerne)
- Therwil Flyers (Therwil)
- Zurich Barracudas (Zurich)
- Zurich Challengers (Zurich)

=== NLB ===
- Embrach Mustangs (Embrach)
- Hunenberg Unicorns (Hunenberg)
- Lausanne Indians (Lausanne)
- Sissach Frogs (Sissach)
- Therwil Flyers 2 (Therwil)
- Wil Pirates (Wil)
- Zurich Barracudas 3 (Zurich)
- Zurich Barracudes Academy (Zurich)
- Zurich Challengers 2 (Zurich)
- Zurich Lions (Zurich)

=== 1. Liga ===
==== East ====
- Embrach Mustangs 2 (Embrach)
- Wil Pirates 2 (Wil)
- Wittenbach Pirates (Wittenbach)
- Zurich Barracudas 4 (Zurich)

==== Central ====
- Bern Cardinals (Bern)
- Dulliken Ravens (Dulliken)
- Hunenberg Unicorns 2 (Hunenberg)
- Lucerne Eagles 2 (Lucerne)
- Sissach Frogs 2 (Sissach)
- Zurich Eighters (Zurich)

==== West ====
- Bern Cardinals (Bern)
- Bulle Baseball (Bulle)
- Geneva Dragons (Geneva)
- Geneva Tigers (Geneva)
- Lausanne Indians 2 (Lausanne)
- Martigny Minotaurs (Martigny)

== Bibliography ==
- Bjarkman, Peter C. (2005). Diamonds Around The Globe: The Encyclopedia Of International Baseball. Greenwood Press. ISBN 9780313322686.
