= Hungary national baseball team =

Information
- Country: Hungary
- Federation: Hungarian National Baseball and Softball Association
- Confederation: WBSC Europe
- Manager: John Goulding

WBSC ranking
- Current: 48 (26 March 2026)

European Championship
- Appearances: 2 (first in 2023)
- Best result: 15th

The Hungary national baseball team is the national baseball team of Hungary. The team represents Hungary in international competitions as a member nation of the WBSC Europe.

== Results and fixtures ==
The following is a list of professional baseball match results currently active in the latest version of the WBSC World Rankings, as well as any future matches that have been scheduled.

Legend

Win Lose Void or postponed Fixture

=== 2023 ===
Euro Championship GS	24 September	Hungary	2–15 (F/7)	Italy	Třebíč, Czech Republic
Euro Championship GS	11:00 UTC+2	LP: Sean Fekete	Boxscore	WP: Mattia Aldegheri	Attendance: 168; Umpires: Edwin Louisa

Euro Championship GS	25 September	Hungary	3–22 (F/5)	Great Britain	Třebíč, Czech Republic
Euro Championship GS	11:00 UTC+2	LP: Ádám Piros	Boxscore	WP: Jake Esch; HR: Nick Ward	Attendance: 190; Umpires: Sergii Bolilyi

Euro Championship GS	26 September	Sweden	17–7 (F/8)	Hungary	Třebíč, Czech Republic
Euro Championship GS	11:00 UTC+2	WP: Oskar Syrén; HR: Leonard Bäckström	Boxscore	LP: Robert Ogg; HR: Graeham Luttor	Attendance: 82; Umpires: Jason Lillebo

Euro Championship RR	28 September	Hungary	2–9	Croatia	Třebíč, Czech Republic
Euro Championship RR	18:30 UTC+2		Boxscore		Attendance: 160; Umpires: Andreas Danielzick

Euro Championship RR	29 September	Hungary	14–19	Greece	Brno, Czech Republic
Euro Championship RR	15:00 UTC+2		Boxscore		Attendance: 215; Umpires: Frane Machiedo

Euro Championship 15th	30 September	Hungary	5–15	Austria	Brno, Czech Republic
Euro Championship 15th	10:00 UTC+2		Boxscore		Attendance: 183; Umpires: Efrem Silvania

=== 2025 ===
Euro Championship GS	20 September	Hungary	1–11 (F/7)	Croatia	Antwerp, Belgium
Euro Championship GS	10:00 UTC+2		Boxscore

Euro Championship GS	21 September	Hungary	9–19 (F/7)	Belgium	Antwerp, Belgium
Euro Championship GS	14:30 UTC+2		Boxscore		Attendance: 634

Euro Championship GS	22 September	Austria	26–2 (F/5)	Hungary	Antwerp, Belgium
Euro Championship GS	10:00 UTC+2		Boxscore		Attendance: 179

Euro Championship RR	23 September	Hungary	3–8	Belgium	Antwerp, Belgium
Euro Championship RR	15:30 UTC+2		Boxscore		Attendance: 131

== Roster ==
Hungary's roster for the 2025 European Baseball Championship, the latest official competition in which the team took part.

Hungary national baseball team – 2025 European Baseball Championship roster
Players		Coaches
Pitchers: 15 Sean Tamás Fekete; 4 Levente Horváth; 13 Zéno Illés; 66 Márk Magas; 50 Alexander Paul Ogg; 36 Robert Steven Ogg; 3 Benedek Peller; 77 Ádám Piros; 21 Carlos Humberto Rubio Hernandez; 12 Márk Tóth	Catchers: 33 Michael Varga; Infielders: 34 Graeham Luttor; 8 Christian Jesus Marcano Hecht; 5 Lorenzo Moretti; 10 Márkó Morua; 1 Bálint Piros; 17 Bence Csaba Takács; 7 Anthony Stephen Temesváry; Outfielders: 18 Ádám Domsicz; 55 Dalton Ketema; 6 Paris Kevin Ketema; 24 Martin Morua; 14 Vincent Temesváry	Manager: 30 Roberto Morua; Coaches: Francisco Gonzaléz; Zsuzsa Moruáné Kertész; 9 Luis Rodriguez; Trey Martin

== Tournament results ==
European Men's Baseball Championship

- 2023: 16th
- 2025: 15th

European Under-21 Baseball Championship

- 2006: 10th
