= 2025 European Baseball Championship =

Tournament details
- Countries: Netherlands; Belgium; Italy
- Dates: 20–27 September 2025
- Teams: 16
- Defending champions: Spain

Final positions
- Champions: Netherlands (25th title)
- Runners-up: Italy
- Third place: Czech Republic
- Fourth place: Spain

Tournament statistics
- Best BA: (Czech Republic) Martin Červenka (.542)
- Most HRs: (Italy) Giaconino Lasaracina (6)
- Most SBs: (Switzerland) Hayden Jung-Goldberg & (Switzerland) Marc Willi (4)
- Best ERA: (Germany) Markus Solbach (Note: Solbach had the most innings pitched among pitchers with a 0.00 ERA in the tournament.) (0.00)
- Most Ks (as pitcher): (Netherlands) Kevin Kelly & (Greece) Noah Zavolas (21)

Awards
- MVP: (Netherlands) Didi Gregorius

The 2025 European Men's Baseball Championship was an international baseball tournament organized by WBSC Europe held in Rotterdam, Milan, and Antwerp from 20 to 27 September 2025. It was the 38th edition of the competition.

It was the first edition of the tournament to be held in three countries, as well as the first since 1967 with games held in Belgium.

The Netherlands won the tournament, beating Italy in the championship 6–5 in Rotterdam after beating defending champion Spain in the semifinal. It was the 25th European championship for the Dutch and 27th time facing Italy in the final game. The Czech Republic defeated Spain in the third-place game, their first-ever medal in the tournament. Two Dutch players won the top individual awards, with Didi Gregorius named the MVP and Kevin Kelly the best pitcher.

Hungary and Lithuania, which both lost all their games, were relegated during the tournament.

== Qualification ==
The top 13 teams of the 2023 European Championship qualified automatically for the tournament. The remaining three spots were filled through qualification tournaments in 2024, won by Hungary, Lithuania, and Austria.

=== Qualified teams ===
Team	Qualification method	App	First	Last	Streak	Best placement
Spain	1st in 2023	36th	1954	2023	21	Champions (1955, 2023)
Great Britain	2nd in 2023	18th	1967	2023	14	Runners-up (1967, 2007, 2023)
Netherlands	3rd in 2023	35th	1956	2023	28	Champions (twentyfour times, last in 2021)
Germany	4th in 2023	29th	1954	2023	16	Runners-up (1957)
Czech Republic	5th in 2023	14th	1997	2023	14	Fourth place(2014)
Israel	6th in 2023	4th	2019	2023	4	Runners-up (2021)
France	7th in 2023	28th	1955	2023	19	Third place (1999)
Sweden	8th in 2023	33rd	1960	2023	33	Third place (1981, 1993)
Italy	9th in 2023	37th	1954	2023	28	Champions (ten times, last in 2012)
Croatia	10th in 2023	13th	1999	2023	13	Seventh place (2021)
Belgium	11th in 2023	32nd	1954	2023	8	Champions (1967)
Switzerland	12th in 2023	2nd	2023	2023	2	12th place (2023)
Greece	13th in 2023	9th	2003	2023	3	Runners-up (2003)
Hungary	Group Serbia winner	2nd	2023	2023	2	16th place (2023)
Lithuania	Group Poland winner	1st	—N/a		1	Debut
Austria	Group Ireland winner	5th	2007	2023	4	10th place (2019)

== Group Stage ==
Four groups of four teams competed in a round robin to begin the tournament. The top two teams from groups A and B qualified for the quarterfinals, the second round of the tournament stage. The first round of the tournament, called the crossover playoff, included the bottom two teams from groups A and B and top two teams from groups C and D. The bottom two teams from groups C and D competed in a best-of-three relegation series.

One week before the start of the tournament, Group C games were moved from a stadium in Senago to the Stadio Marco Provini in Novara due to poor conditions at the Senago field. The Italian baseball and softball federation agreed to pay for additional transportation costs from Milan.

Fan entrance to games in Rotterdam on 20 September were affected by pro-Palestinian protests regarding the Gaza war and Israel's participation in the tournament. Protesters returned for subsequent Israel games. Rain also delayed some of the 20 September games in Rotterdam.

Two of the three host countries, the Netherlands and Italy, went undefeated in group play while Belgium managed one win and was eliminated from the final round.

- All times Central European Summer Time (UTC+02:00)

=== Group A ===
Pos	Team	Pld	W	L	RF	RA	PCT	GB	Qualification
1	Germany	3	2	1	14	8	.667	—	Advance to quarterfinals
2	Czech Republic	3	2	1	20	9	.667	—	Advance to quarterfinals
3	Spain	3	2	1	20	11	.667	—	Advance to crossover playoff
4	Sweden	3	0	3	3	29	.000	2	Advance to crossover playoff

Updated to match(es) played on 22 September 2025. Source: WBSC Europe

Date	Local time	Road team	Score	Home team	Inn.	Venue	Game duration	Attendance	Boxscore
20 Sep	14:00	Czech Republic	1–8	Germany		Neptunus Familiestadion	2:58		Boxscore
20 Sep	20:30	Sweden	0–15	Spain	F/5	Neptunus Familiestadion	1:46	81	Boxscore
21 Sep	18:00	Germany	4–3	Sweden		Neptunus Familiestadion	3:01	115	Boxscore
21 Sep	19:30	Spain	1–9	Czech Republic		Neptunus Familiestadion	2:42	200	Boxscore
22 Sep	14:00	Germany	2–4	Spain		Neptunus Familiestadion	2:32	353	Boxscore
22 Sep	18:00	Sweden	0–10	Czech Republic	F/8	Neptunus Familiestadion	2:52	332	Boxscore

=== Group B ===
Pos	Team	Pld	W	L	RF	RA	PCT	GB	Qualification
1	Netherlands (H)	3	3	0	31	8	1.000	—	Advance to quarterfinals
2	Great Britain	3	2	1	28	14	.667	1	Advance to quarterfinals
3	Israel	3	1	2	10	29	.333	2	Advance to crossover playoff
4	France	3	0	3	12	30	.000	3	Advance to crossover playoff

Updated to match(es) played on 22 September 2025. Source: WBSC Europe
(H) Hosts

Date	Local time	Road team	Score	Home team	Inn.	Venue	Game duration	Attendance	Boxscore
20 Sep	13:00	France	4–8	Israel		Neptunus Familiestadion	3:18	189	Boxscore
20 Sep	20:30	Netherlands	9–3	Great Britain		Neptunus Familiestadion	3:01	3,000	Boxscore
21 Sep	13:00	Great Britain	16–1	Israel	F/8	Neptunus Familiestadion	3:20	257	Boxscore
21 Sep	15:00	Netherlands	13–4	France		Neptunus Familiestadion	3:41	3,000	Boxscore
22 Sep	13:00	France	4–9	Great Britain		Neptunus Familiestadion	3:25	193	Boxscore
22 Sep	19:30	Israel	1–9	Netherlands		Neptunus Familiestadion	2:45	820	Boxscore

=== Group C ===
Pos	Team	Pld	W	L	RF	RA	PCT	GB	Qualification
1	Italy (H)	3	3	0	43	4	1.000	—	Advance to crossover playoff
2	Switzerland	3	2	1	25	31	.667	1	Advance to crossover playoff
3	Greece	3	1	2	16	24	.333	2	
4	Lithuania	3	0	3	8	33	.000	3	

Updated to match(es) played on 22 September 2025. Source: WBSC Europe
(H) Hosts

Date	Local time	Road team	Score	Home team	Inn.	Venue	Game duration	Attendance	Boxscore
20 Sep	10:30	Lithuania	3–4	Greece		Stadio Marco Provini	2:48	160	Boxscore
20 Sep	15:30	Switzerland	0–18	Italy	F/5	Stadio Marco Provini	1:55	250	Boxscore
21 Sep	10:30	Greece	8–12	Switzerland		Stadio Marco Provini	3:15	150	Boxscore
21 Sep	15:30	Italy	16–0	Lithuania	F/6	Stadio Marco Provini	2:14	200	Boxscore
22 Sep	11:30	Lithuania	5–13	Switzerland	F/7	Stadio Marco Provini	2:40	80	Boxscore
22 Sep	14:30	Greece	4–9	Italy	F/7	Stadio Marco Provini	2:26	110	Boxscore

=== Group D ===
Pos	Team	Pld	W	L	RF	RA	PCT	GB	Qualification
1	Croatia	3	3	0	21	6	1.000	—	Advance to crossover playoff
2	Austria	3	2	1	44	14	.667	1	Advance to crossover playoff
3	Belgium (H)	3	1	2	30	31	.333	2	
4	Hungary	3	0	3	12	56	.000	3	

Updated to match(es) played on 22 September 2025. Source: WBSC Europe
(H) Hosts

Date	Local time	Road team	Score	Home team	Inn.	Venue	Game duration	Attendance	Boxscore
20 Sep	10:00	Hungary	1–11	Croatia	F/7	Squirrels Venue	2:06		Boxscore
20 Sep	14:30	Austria	16–8	Belgium		Squirrels Venue	3:42	715	Boxscore
21 Sep	10:00	Croatia	4–2	Austria		Squirrels Venue	2:58	358	Boxscore
21 Sep	14:30	Hungary	9–19	Belgium	F/7	Squirrels Venue	3:03	634	Boxscore
22 Sep	10:00	Austria	26–2	Hungary	F/5	Squirrels Venue	2:45	179	Boxscore
22 Sep	15:30	Belgium	3–6	Croatia	F/10	Squirrels Venue	3:18	293	Boxscore

== Relegation round ==
The relegation round was a best-of-three series with the third and fourth place teams of Groups C and D, with the result of the Group stage game serving as Game 1 of the series. The losers of both series, Lithuania and Hungary, was relegated. Both teams lost all their games in the tournament.

Date	Local time	Road team	Score	Home team	Inn.	Venue	Game duration	Attendance	Boxscore
23 Sep	10:30	Lithuania	5–13	Greece		Stadio Marco Provini	3:25	60	Boxscore

Date	Local time	Road team	Score	Home team	Inn.	Venue	Game duration	Attendance	Boxscore
23 Sep	15:30	Hungary	3–8	Belgium		Squirrels Venue	2:44	131	Boxscore

== Final round ==
- All times Central European Summer Time (UTC+02:00)

The Netherlands won the tournament, going undefeated. In the semifinals, avenging a loss to Spain in the 2023 championship semifinals, Dutch pitcher Kevin Kelly relieved the injured Tom de Blok in the first inning and got 16 strikeouts in 8 1/3 innings. That performance, along with two saves earlier in the tournament, won Kelly the best pitcher award. The Netherlands beat Italy, which had been the only other undefeated team, 6–5 in the championship game. Giaconino Lasaracina, who hit a tournament-leading six home runs, homered for Italy in the loss, while Sharlon Schoop hit a home run for the Dutch and had 2 runs batted in.

Spain lost in the third place game, 9–2 to the Czech Republic, giving the Czechs their first medal in the European tournament. Great Britain, after finishing second in the 2023 tournament, was knocked out of title contention again by Spain, losing in the quarterfinals.

=== Championship ===
==== Bracket ====
Crossover playoff 24 September
C1 Italy	6
B4 France	2
C2 Switzerland	1
B3 Israel	9
D2 Austria	0
A3 Spain	10
D1 Croatia	9
A4 Sweden	3

Quarterfinals; 25 September
C1 Italy	1
A1 Germany	0
B3 Israel	3
A2 Czech Republic	4
A3 Spain	7
B2 Great Britain	0
D1 Croatia	1
B1 Netherlands	3

Semifinals; 26 September
C1 Italy	8
A2 Czech Republic	5
A3 Spain	1
B1 Netherlands	6

Final; 27 September
C1 Italy	5
B1 Netherlands	6
3rd Place
A2 Czech Republic	9
A3 Spain	2

==== Crossover playoff ====
Date	Local time	Road team	Score	Home team	Inn.	Venue	Game duration	Attendance	Boxscore
24 Sep	13:00	Switzerland	1–9	Israel		Neptunus Familiestadion	2:36	105	Boxscore
24 Sep	14:00	Croatia	9–3	Sweden		Neptunus Familiestadion	2:53	520	Boxscore
24 Sep	18:00	Austria	0–10	Spain	F/7	Neptunus Familiestadion	2:01	237	Boxscore
24 Sep	19:30	Italy	6–2	France		Neptunus Familiestadion	3:34	330	Boxscore

==== Quarterfinals ====
Date	Local time	Road team	Score	Home team	Inn.	Venue	Game duration	Attendance	Boxscore
25 Sep	14:00	Israel	3–4	Czech Republic		Neptunus Familiestadion	2:53	93	Boxscore
25 Sep	15:00	Italy	1–0	Germany		Neptunus Familiestadion	2:22	950	Boxscore
25 Sep	18:00	Spain	7–0	Great Britain		Neptunus Familiestadion	2:54	133	Boxscore
25 Sep	19:30	Croatia	1–3	Netherlands		Neptunus Familiestadion	2:25	1,450	Boxscore

==== Semifinals ====
Date	Local time	Road team	Score	Home team	Inn.	Venue	Game duration	Attendance	Boxscore
26 Sep	15:00	Italy	8–5	Czech Republic		Neptunus Familiestadion	3:20	953	Boxscore
26 Sep	19:30	Spain	1–6	Netherlands		Neptunus Familiestadion	2:47	2,463	Boxscore

==== Third place game ====
Date	Local time	Road team	Score	Home team	Inn.	Venue	Game duration	Attendance	Boxscore
27 Sep	14:00	Czech Republic	9–2	Spain		Neptunus Familiestadion	2:58	1,600	Boxscore

==== Final ====
Date	Local time	Road team	Score	Home team	Inn.	Venue	Game duration	Attendance	Boxscore
27 Sep	19:30	Italy	5–6	Netherlands		Neptunus Familiestadion	3:03	3,000	Boxscore

=== Fifth place ===
==== Bracket ====
5th-8th place
26 September
Israel	9
Germany	10
26 September
Great Britain	3
Croatia	2

5th place
27 September
Germany	2
Great Britain	0
7th Place
27 September
Israel	11
Croatia	5

==== 5th-8th place game ====
Date	Local time	Road team	Score	Home team	Inn.	Venue	Game duration	Attendance	Boxscore
26 Sep	14:00	Israel	9-10	Germany		Neptunus Familiestadion	4:02	153	Boxscore
26 Sep	18:00	Great Britain	3–2	Croatia		Neptunus Familiestadion	2:53	85	Boxscore

==== Seventh place game ====
Date	Local time	Road team	Score	Home team	Inn.	Venue	Game duration	Attendance	Boxscore
27 Sep	11:00	Israel	11–5	Croatia		Neptunus Familiestadion	2:48	217	Boxscore

==== Fifth place game ====
Date	Local time	Road team	Score	Home team	Inn.	Venue	Game duration	Attendance	Boxscore
27 Sep	16:00	Germany	2–0	Great Britain		Neptunus Familiestadion	2:52	443	Boxscore

=== Ninth place ===
==== Bracket ====
9th-12th place
25 September
Switzerland	0
Sweden	1
25 September
Austria	6
France	3

9th place
26 September
Sweden	3
Austria	6
11th Place
26 September
France	3
Switzerland	11

==== 9th-12th place game ====
Date	Local time	Road team	Score	Home team	Inn.	Venue	Game duration	Attendance	Boxscore
25 Sep	10:00	Switzerland	0–1	Sweden		Neptunus Familiestadion	2:17	69	Boxscore
25 Sep	11:00	Austria	6–3	France		Neptunus Familiestadion	3:04	223	Boxscore

==== Eleventh place game ====
Date	Local time	Road team	Score	Home team	Inn.	Venue	Game duration	Attendance	Boxscore
26 Sep	10:00	France	3–11	Switzerland		Neptunus Familiestadion	3:28	113	Boxscore

==== Ninth place game ====
Date	Local time	Road team	Score	Home team	Inn.	Venue	Game duration	Attendance	Boxscore
26 Sep	11:00	Sweden	3–6	Austria		Neptunus Familiestadion	3:04	223	Boxscore

== Final standings ==
Rk	Team	W	L	Pct.
1st place, gold medalist(s)	Netherlands	6	0	1.000
2nd place, silver medalist(s)	Italy	6	1	.857
3rd place, bronze medalist(s)	Czech Republic	4	2	.667
4	Spain	4	3	.571
5	Germany	4	2	.667
6	Great Britain	3	3	.500
7	Israel	3	4	.429
8	Croatia	4	3	.571
9	Austria	4	2	.667
10	Sweden	1	5	.167
11	Switzerland	3	3	.500
12	France	0	6	.000
13	Belgium	2	2	.500
13	Greece	2	2	.500
15	Hungary^	0	4	.000
15	Lithuania^	0	4	.000

^ - Relegated to B Pool European Qualifier

== Honors and awards ==
=== Awards ===
Award	Player	Ref.
Most valuable player	(Netherlands) Didi Gregorius	
Best pitcher	(Netherlands) Kevin Kelly	
Best batter	(Italy) Renzo Martini	
Outstanding defensive player	(Italy) Gabriele Angioi	
Most home runs	(Italy) Giaconino Lasaracina (6)	

== Statistical leaders ==
=== Batting ===
Stat	Name	Total
Batting average	(Hungary) Graeham Luttor	.615
Hits	(United Kingdom) Julian Sanders	14
Runs	(Austria) Elias Kreska	10
Runs batted in	(Czech Republic) Martin Červenka	16
Home runs	(Italy) Giaconino Lasaracina	6
Slugging percentage	(Hungary) Graeham Luttor	1.308

=== Pitching ===
Stat	Name	Total
Wins	6 tied with (Note: José Díaz, Pablo Guillén, Lars Huijer, Shairon Martis, Gabriele Quattrini, Ondřej Satoria)	2
Losses	4 tied with (Note: Jorge Balboa, Jake Fishman, Quentin Moulin, Eimantas Žičkus)	2
Saves	(Germany) César Aquino	2
Saves	(Netherlands) Kevin Kelly	2
Innings pitched	(Croatia) José Díaz	14.0
Innings pitched	(Germany) Markus Solbach	14.0
Earned runs allowed	16 tied with	0.00
Strikeouts	(Netherlands) Kevin Kelly	21
Strikeouts	(Greece) Noah Zavolas	21

== Notable participants ==
The championship featured several former Major League Baseball players, including Gregorius, Jonathan Schoop, and Shairon Martis for the Netherlands, Eric Sogard for the Czech Republic, and Luis Guillorme and Rhiner Cruz for Spain. Dovydas Neverauskas pitched and played first base for Lithuania. Croatia had first baseman Joey Terdoslavich and pitcher Asher Wojciechowski.

Several former players also managed and coached teams. All-Star Adam Jones was Spain's hitting coach. Former catcher Francisco Cervelli managed Italy, with former executive Allard Baird serving as the team's bench coach. Zach Vincej, Chase d'Arnaud, and Steve Rodriguez were on Croatia's coaching staff. Erik Pappas was Greece's bench coach. Dennis Cook, the former manager of Sweden and Poland, was Sweden's pitching coach.

== Broadcasting ==
The tournament was broadcast on WBSC Europe's paid streaming platform, baseballeurope.tv.
