= Didi Gregorius =

Curaçaoan-Dutch baseball player (born 1990)

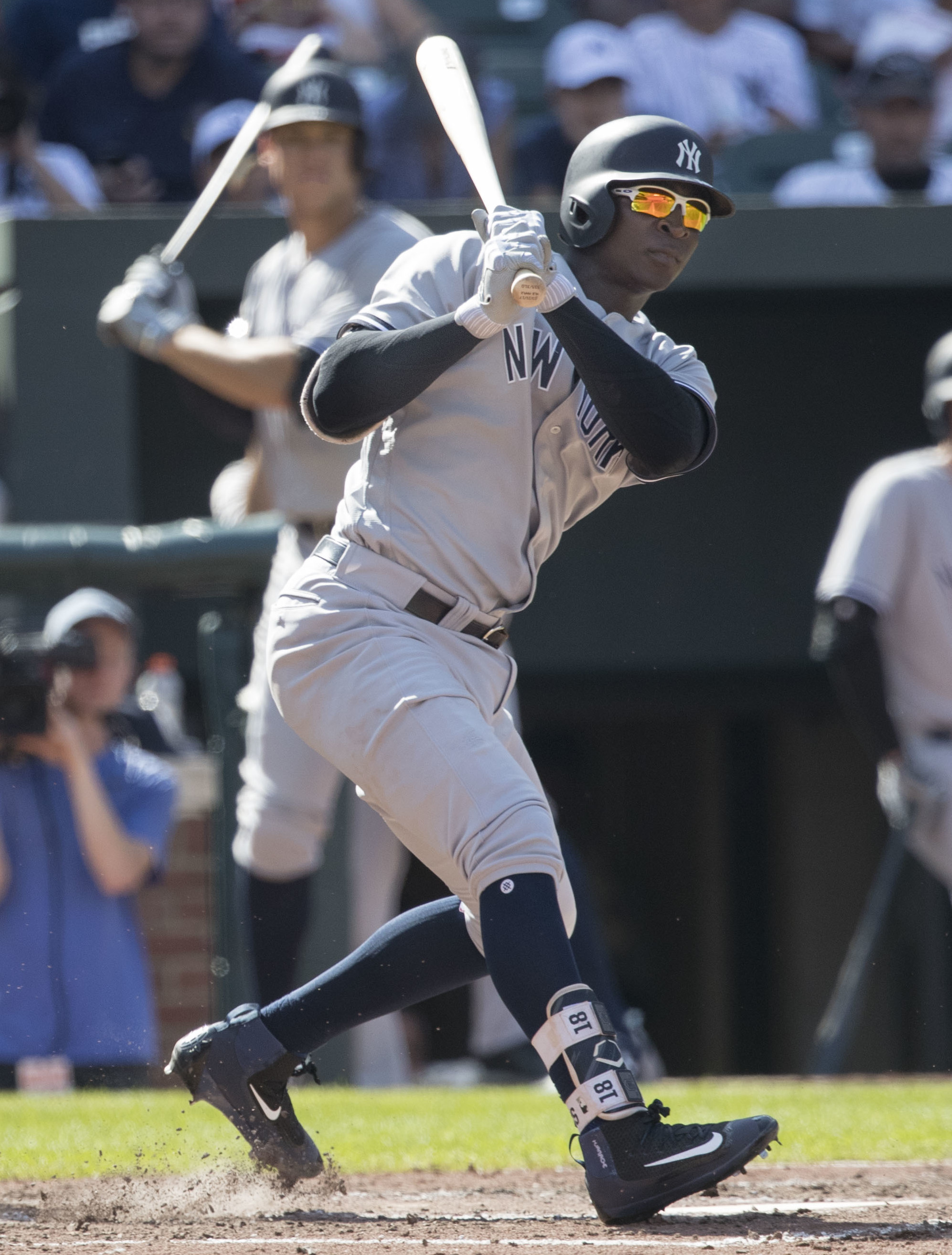
- Gregorius with the New York Yankees in 2017

Free agent
- Shortstop
- Born: February 18, 1990 (age 36); Amsterdam, Netherlands
- Bats: Left Throws: Right

MLB debut
- September 5, 2012, for the Cincinnati Reds

MLB statistics (through 2022 season)
- Batting average: .257
- Hits: 999
- Home runs: 134
- Runs batted in: 530
- Stats at Baseball Reference

Teams
- Cincinnati Reds (2012); Arizona Diamondbacks (2013–2014); New York Yankees (2015–2019); Philadelphia Phillies (2020–2022)
Medals
Men's baseball
Representing Netherlands
Baseball World Cup
Gold medal – first place	2011 Panama	Team
Intercontinental Cup
Silver medal – second place	2010 Taichung	Team
European Championship
Bronze medal – third place	2023 Czechia	Team
Gold medal – first place	2025 Rotterdam	Team

Mariekson Julius "Didi" Gregorius (born February 18, 1990) is a Curaçaoan-Dutch professional baseball shortstop who is a free agent. He has previously played in Major League Baseball (MLB) for the Cincinnati Reds, Arizona Diamondbacks, New York Yankees, and Philadelphia Phillies.

Gregorius was born in Amsterdam, where his father played baseball. His family moved to Curaçao when Gregorius was five years old, at which point he began playing tee-ball and youth baseball. MLB scouts began taking notice of Gregorius when he was a teenager, and he signed with the Reds in 2007 after they offered to bring him to the United States. Gregorius' rise through the Reds' farm system was hindered in 2011 when a chronic kidney malfunction caused him to miss two months of the season, but he made his major league debut in September 2012. After that season, with Gregorius' path to the majors blocked by starting shortstop Zack Cozart, Cincinnati traded him to Arizona, where he split his playing time with Chris Owings and Cliff Pennington.

The Yankees, needing a shortstop to replace the recently retired Derek Jeter, acquired Gregorius in December 2014, and he played the next five seasons for the team. His batting improved with the Yankees: in addition to breaking Jeter's single-season home run record in 2017, he put up 20 or more home runs in three consecutive seasons. Despite missing several weeks of the 2019 season while recovering from Tommy John surgery, Gregorius continued to hit for power upon his return, with a postseason grand slam securing the Yankees' place in the 2019 American League Championship Series.

The Yankees chose not to extend his contract at the end of the season, and the Phillies signed Gregorius as a free agent that winter. Gregorius' first two seasons with the Phillies were hindered by the COVID-19 pandemic, associated visa issues, and a battle with pseudogout, and he batted a career low .209 in 2021. The Phillies released him in August 2022, and he played in the Mexican League from 2023 to 2026.

Gregorius has represented the Dutch national baseball team at several international tournaments, including the Baseball World Cup and World Baseball Classic. At the 2011 Baseball World Cup, he and his teammates received honorary knighthood after defeating Cuba in the gold medal match. He was named the most valuable player of the 2025 European Championship.

== Family and early life ==
Gregorius was born in Amsterdam on February 18, 1990. His father, Johannes Gregorius Sr., worked as a carpenter and pitched for the Amsterdam Pirates of the Honkbal Hoofdklasse, the Dutch professional baseball league, while his mother, Sheritsa Stroop, had played for the Netherlands women's national softball team. Gregorius' paternal grandfather, Antonio, was also a baseball player, pitching in four games for the Netherlands Antilles at the 1955 Pan American Games.

The Gregorius family moved from Amsterdam to Curaçao in 1995, to follow Gregorius Sr.'s baseball career. Gregorius, inspired by his older brother Johannes Jr., began playing tee-ball and Little League Baseball in the Netherlands and took up drawing in his free time. Gregorius, his brother, and his father played together on a semi-pro team that won its league in 2006 and 2007. In addition to baseball, Gregorius played soccer and basketball throughout his childhood, but he was not as invested in those other sports.

== Professional career ==
=== Cincinnati Reds ===
==== Minor leagues ====
Jim Stoeckel, a scout for the Cincinnati Reds of Major League Baseball (MLB), became interested in Gregorius after watching him play an under-18 tournament with the Dutch Antilles in 2006. The Reds signed Gregorius as an international free agent two years later at the behest of Stoeckel, for a signing bonus of $50,000. The Seattle Mariners and San Diego Padres had also expressed interest in Gregorius, but he chose to sign with the Reds because they offered him an opportunity to begin playing professional baseball in the United States rather than in the Venezuelan or Dominican Summer Leagues. He made his professional baseball debut in 2008 with the Gulf Coast Reds, a Rookie League team. His rookie outing was mostly unremarkable, with a .155 batting average in 109 plate appearances, as well as 10 strikeouts and 12 errors in 134 chances.

In 2009, Gregorius primarily appeared with the rookie-level Billings Mustangs of the Pioneer League, batting .314 in 50 games, but he also played in the High-A Florida State League for the Sarasota Reds. In 22 games with Sarasota, Gregorius batted .254, with eight runs, four doubles, and two RBI. The following year, while playing with the Single-A Dayton Dragons, the Reds' farm system took notice of Gregorius' powerful infield arm, as well as his speed on the base path: he fell one triple short of the club record with 11, and stole 16 bases, in addition to hitting .273 with five home runs. On August 31, after Miguel Rojas was promoted to Double-A, Gregorius joined the High-A Lynchburg Hillcats to serve as that team's starting shortstop. He played seven games with Lynchburg, batting .240 with six hits and four runs. After the regular season, Gregorius played in the Australian Baseball League with the Canberra Cavalry, where he was named the league's Defensive Player of the Year. Despite batting only .189, he enjoyed his time in Australia and said that playing against major league veterans helped him when he returned to the United States.

During a routine test in the spring of 2011, doctors found that Gregorius had elevated blood levels of cholesterol and proteins, as well as hypertension. He was initially suspected of using performance-enhancing substances, but further tests revealed a kidney malfunction. Gregorius was ordered not to play baseball and to adopt a vegetarian diet; these lifestyle changes, combined with a medication regimen, allowed him to return to the field after two months of recovery. When he returned to the field, it was with the High-A Bakersfield Blaze, before a midseason promotion to the Double-A Carolina Mudcats. Between the two teams, Gregorius batted .289 for the season, with seven home runs, 44 RBI, and 48 runs in 84 games and 363 plate appearances. That November, Gregorius was one of six players that the Reds added to their 40-man roster to protect him from the Rule 5 draft.

Gregorius entered the 2012 season as a top Double-A prospect with the Pensacola Blue Wahoos. Through the first 80 games of the season, he batted .282 with one home run, 31 RBI, 45 runs, and three stolen bases, enough to receive midseason All-Star honors from the Southern League. After 81 games in Pensacola, the Reds promoted Gregorius to the Triple-A Louisville Bats of the International League. In 48 games there, he batted .243 with six home runs, 23 RBI, and 25 runs in 202 plate appearances.

==== Major leagues ====
A September call-up for the Reds, Gregorius made his major league debut on September 5, 2012, starting in place of Zack Cozart for a 6–2 loss to the Philadelphia Phillies. In eight games at the end of the season, Gregorius batted .300 with two RBI. After the season, Gregorius played in the Arizona Fall League, helping take the Peoria Javelinas to a championship title by batting .278 with one home run and eight RBIs in 74 at bats.

=== Arizona Diamondbacks ===
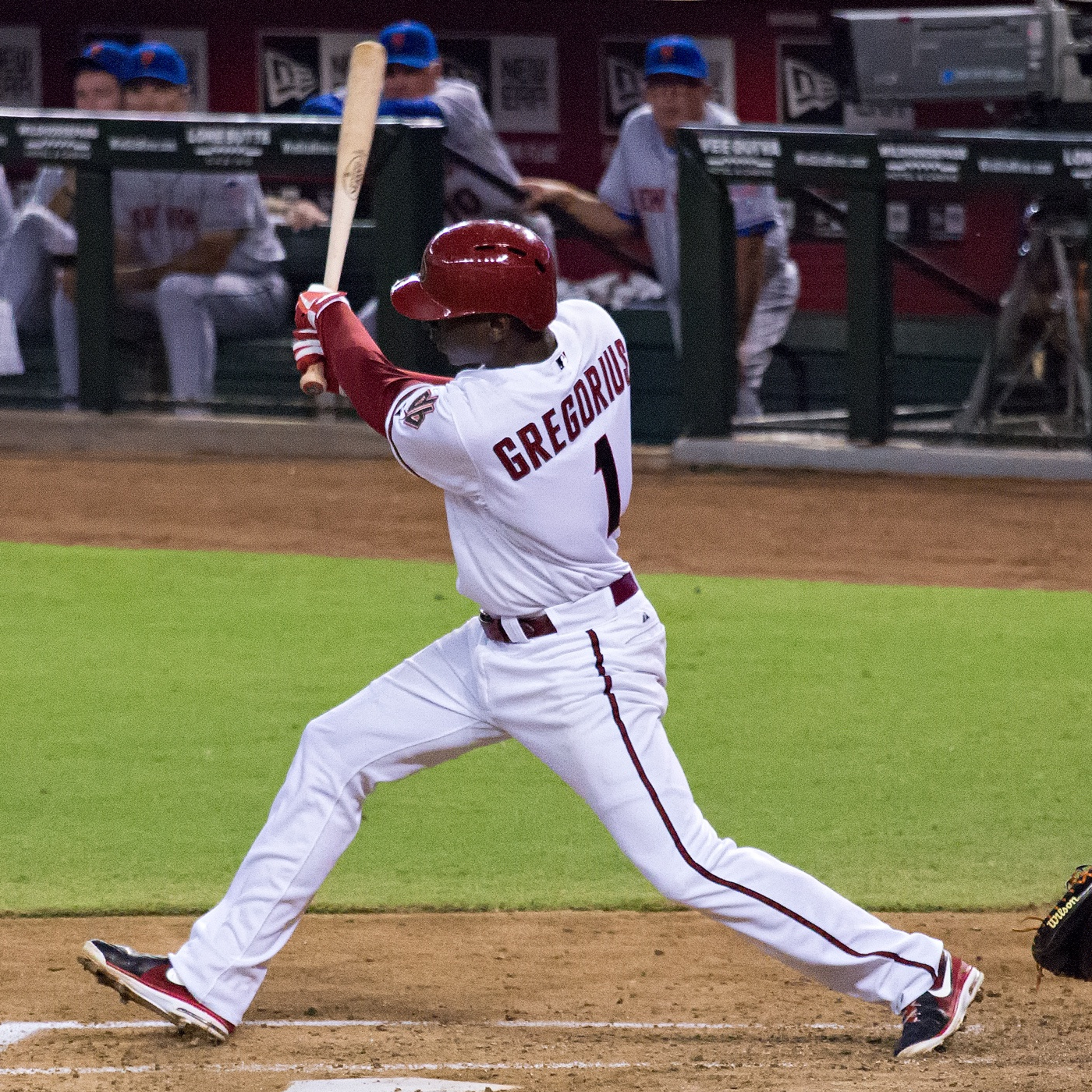
Gregorius batting for the Arizona Diamondbacks in 2013

Gregorius' future with the Reds was hindered by Cozart, a more experienced shortstop who was presumed to have more offensive power, and thus he became an attractive trade target for Cincinnati after the 2012 season. On December 11, 2012, Gregorius was part of a three-team trade for Cincinnati: initially, he and Drew Stubbs were sent to the Cleveland Indians in exchange for outfielder Shin-Soo Choo and infielder Jason Donald, but, as the Indians already had an established shortstop in Asdrubal Cabrera, they traded Gregorius to the Arizona Diamondbacks for pitcher Trevor Bauer.

Later that month, Gregorius injured his elbow while playing catch, and he was unable to resume throwing until spring training had already begun. The Diamondbacks agreed to start Gregorius with the Triple-A Reno Aces until his rehab assignment was completed, but after Aaron Hill was sidelined with a fractured hand, Gregorius was called up to start at second base. In the first pitch of his first at-bat on April 18, 2013, Gregorius hit his first major league home run off of New York Yankees pitcher Phil Hughes. He was the seventh Diamondback to hit a home run in his first at-bat with the team, and the first to do so on the first pitch. On April 27, Gregorius was hit by a pitch from Colorado Rockies reliever Josh Outman. He was struck in the right temple with a 93 mph (150 km/h) fastball and fell to the ground; ultimately, Gregorius was able to leave the plate on his own, and Cliff Pennington filled in as a pinch runner. He was placed on the seven-day concussion list after the game and was reinstated on May 4. Gregorius put up a sturdy .252 average in 103 games, but began to lose playing time towards the end of the season due to his inefficiency against left-handed pitchers, averaging only .200 with a .267 on-base percentage.

Gregorius entered spring training in 2014 in competition with prospect Chris Owings for the starting shortstop role within the Diamondbacks organization. Owings was ultimately named to the Diamondbacks' opening day roster, with Gregorius sent to Triple-A in the most controversial roster decision of the season. Previously, general manager Kevin Towers and manager Kirk Gibson had suggested that Owings and Gregorius would both make the 25-man roster and split time in the middle infield, especially as outfielder Cody Ross was starting the season on the disabled list, but Towers instead optioned Gregorius to the minors and told reporters that he would be called up in case of injury. That June, Pennington, serving as the team's backup shortstop, suffered an injury that forced Arizona to call up Gregorius. Gibson wanted to keep Owings as the starting infielder but intended to split his playing time with Gregorius more equitably than Owings had split with Pennington. Gregorius played in 80 major league games in 2014, batting .226 in 270 at bats, with six home runs, 27 RBIs, and 35 runs. He played 67 of those games at shortstop, 11 at second base, and two at third base.

=== New York Yankees ===
Derek Jeter, the New York Yankees bound for the Hall of Fame, announced in February 2014 that he would retire at the end of the year, leaving the team to find an appropriate replacement. Hanley Ramirez, Troy Tulowitzki, and J. J. Hardy were all speculated as acquisition targets for the team, who ultimately focused on acquiring Gregorius. The Yankees acquired Gregorius on December 5, 2014, in a three-team trade with Arizona and the Detroit Tigers: Gregorius went from Arizona to New York, Shane Greene went from New York to Detroit, and Robbie Ray and Domingo Leyba went from Detroit to Arizona.

==== 2015–16 ====
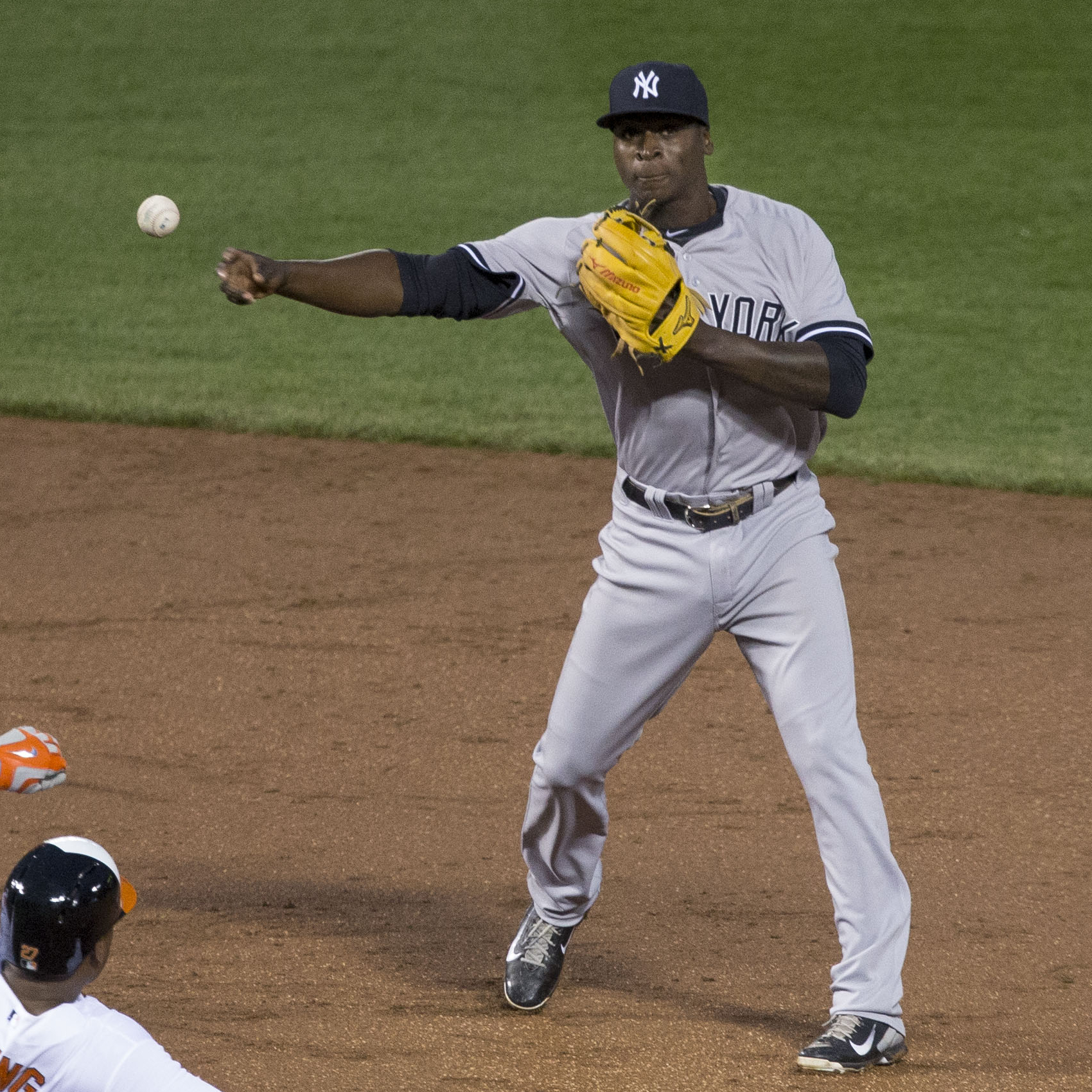
Gregorius playing shortstop for the Yankees in 2015

Gregorius, named the opening day shortstop for the Yankees, told reporters that he was not worried about replacing Jeter and that he was more focused on his own performance than any comparisons to the previous infielder. He struggled through the first part of the season, making six errors by the end of May and batting only .222, but he began to find his stride in June, committing only one error between June 7 and August 3 and increasing his batting average to .260 during that span. On August 28, Gregorius went 4-for-5 with one home run and set a career-high six RBIs in a 15–4 rout of the Atlanta Braves. His first-inning home run was the seventh of the season and came only a day after his sixth home run. In his first season with the Yankees, Gregorius played in 155 games, batting .265 with nine home runs and 56 RBIs. After the season ended, Gregorius was named a finalist for the American League (AL) Gold Glove Award at shortstop, ultimately losing to Alcides Escobar of the Kansas City Royals.

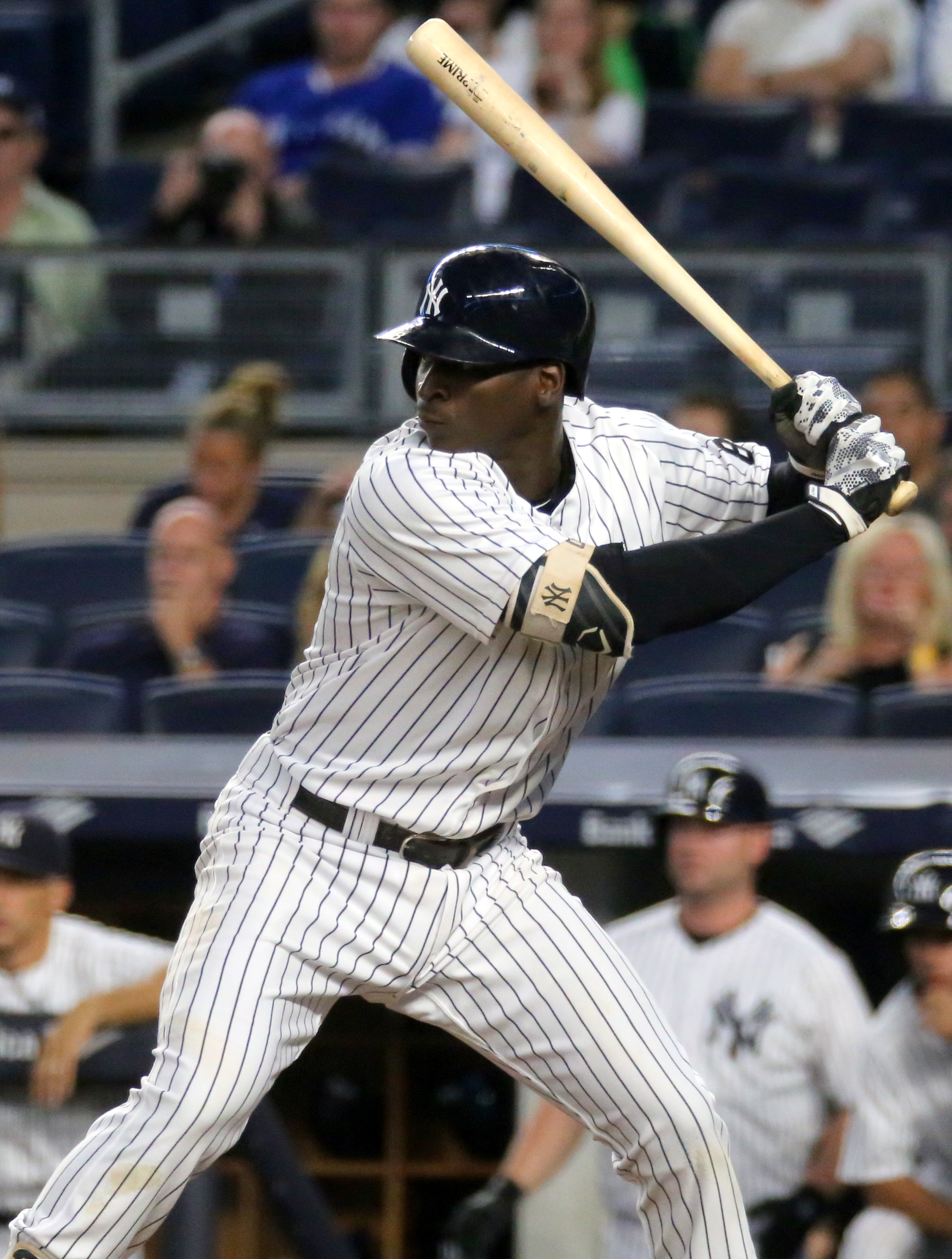
Gregorius batting for the Yankees in 2016

Gregorius entered the 2016 season last in the batting order but had a breakout year, setting career highs with a .447 slugging percentage, 32 doubles, 20 home runs, and 70 RBIs. He told reporters that he had not focused on hitting home runs, and that he was actually working on line drives, but that, "If they go out, they go out." He had spent the offseason working with fellow Curaçao native Hensley Meulens, the hitting coach for the San Francisco Giants. Meulens focused on improving Gregorius' efficacy against left-handed pitchers, and by mid-July, his .366 average against southpaws was the best in the league among left-handed hitters. On June 29, Gregorius hit the first walk-off home run of his major league career, a two-run blast against the Texas Rangers, who had the best record in the AL at that time. The 2016 Yankees season was considered an overall disappointment, but Gregorius' performance established him as a central piece as the team looked ahead towards rebuilding during the offseason.

==== 2017 ====
Prior to the 2017 season, Gregorius suffered a shoulder injury while fielding a double play during the World Baseball Classic. He was required to spend two weeks engaging in no baseball activity, followed by an estimated four weeks of rehab assignments, leaving the Yankees without their expected opening day shortstop. He began a series of rehab assignments for the Tampa Yankees on April 22, with an estimated major league return date of May 1. Gregorius was activated on April 28, starting in a 14–11 win over the Baltimore Orioles. Upon his return, Gregorius said that he felt "locked in" at the plate, putting up an eight-game hitting streak in mid-July, with home runs in three consecutive games. He was a finalist for a position in the MLB All-Star Game, but the fan vote ultimately went to Mike Moustakas of the Royals. On September 4, Gregorius hit his 20th home run of the year, becoming the first Yankees shortstop to knock in 20 or more home runs in back-to-back seasons. Later that month, on September 20, Gregorius hit his 25th home run of the season, passing Jeter's record for most single-season home runs by a Yankees shortstop. Limited to 136 games with his shoulder injury, Gregorius batted .287 for the regular season, with 87 RBIs and 73 runs.

Facing the Minnesota Twins in the American League Wild Card Game, Gregorius hit a game-tying three-run home run in the bottom of the first inning, helping the Yankees to take the game 8–4 and advance to the American League Division Series (ALDS). In the series-deciding Game 5 of the ALDS, Gregorius hit two home runs against Cleveland ace Corey Kluber. The Yankees defeated Cleveland 5–2 and advanced to the American League Championship Series (ALCS). Gregorius became the second Yankee to hit two home runs in a winner-take-all postseason game. The Yankees lost the ALCS to the Houston Astros in seven games. He batted .250 with 3 home runs and 7 RBI in 13 postseason games.

==== 2018 ====
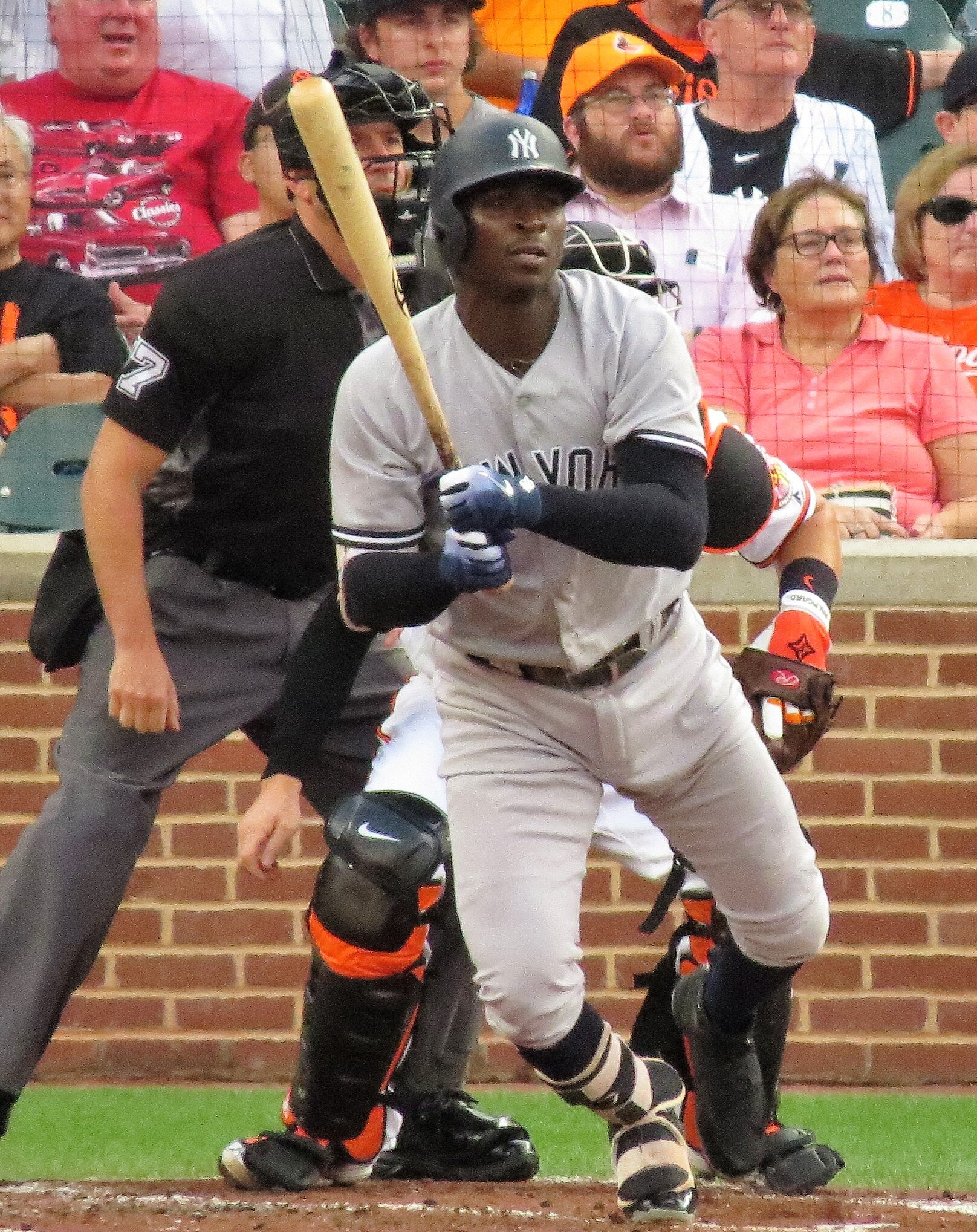
Gregorius batting in 2018

Gregorius began the 2018 season with a career-high eight-RBI performance in the Yankee's April 3 home opener against the Tampa Bay Rays, helping to push the team to an 11–4 victory. Through the month of April, Gregorius led the league with 10 home runs, 30 RBIs, and a .766 slugging percentage, and he received both AL Player of the Week and Player of the Month honors at the end of the month. His performance in April was followed by a slump through May and the start of June, during which Gregorius batted .177 and scored only one home run. He snapped this dry spell with two home runs against the Washington Nationals on June 12. In addition to putting Gregorius back on pace to record 20 home runs in a season, he also became, in that game, the first Yankees shortstop to have three multi-home run games in a season. Gregorius batted .268 for the regular season, with 86 RBIs and 89 runs in 504 at bats. His 27 home runs, meanwhile, helped the Yankees break the MLB single-season record, set by the 1997 Seattle Mariners; Gleyber Torres hit the Yankees' 265th home run of the year on September 29.

On September 23, Gregorius' game-winning run against the Orioles helped the Yankees clinch a Wild Card berth, but he tore the cartilage in his wrist while sliding home, leaving it in question whether he would be healthy for the postseason. He received a cortisone shot and returned to the lineup on September 28 for the final game of the regular season, an 11–6 rout of the Red Sox. The Yankees beat the Oakland Athletics 7–2 in the Wild Card Game, with Gregorius scoring an RBI on a sacrifice fly that brought home Luke Voit. Gregorius struggled defensively against the Red Sox in the ALDS, uncharacteristically missing throws in Games 3 and 4. The Red Sox took the series in four games. He batted .235 with one double in 5 postseason games.

==== 2019 ====
Gregorius, who had already suffered an "asymptomatic" partial ulnar collateral ligament tear when he was acquired by the Yankees in 2014, aggravated his injury when he made a throw from the outfield in Game 2 of the ALCS. He had been able to push through the rest of the Yankees' playoff run, but required Tommy John surgery after the season to repair the elbow. Gregorius subsequently began the 2019 season on the 60-day injured list and was activated on June 7, after eight months of rehab. On July 23, Gregorius batted a perfect 5-for-5 against the Minnesota Twins, picking up seven RBIs to help the Yankees win 14–12 in extra innings. It was the second time that Gregorius had gone 4-for-4 or better with seven RBIs in a game, joining Lou Gehrig and Joe DiMaggio as the only Yankees to accomplish the feat multiple times. In the sixth inning of that same game, Gregorius hit his 100th career home run, off of Twins right-hander Kyle Gibson. He finished the regular season with a .238 average in 324 at bats, with 16 home runs, 61 RBIs, and 47 runs. The Yankees faced the Twins again in the ALDS, and in Game 2, Gregorius hit the first postseason grand slam by a Yankees shortstop. The Yankees advanced to the ALCS, but were defeated in six games by the Astros. In his final trip to the MLB postseason, he hit . 273 with one home run in 9 games. After the season, Gregorius became a free agent, with the Yankees choosing not to make a one-year, $17.8 million qualifying offer to him.

=== Philadelphia Phillies ===
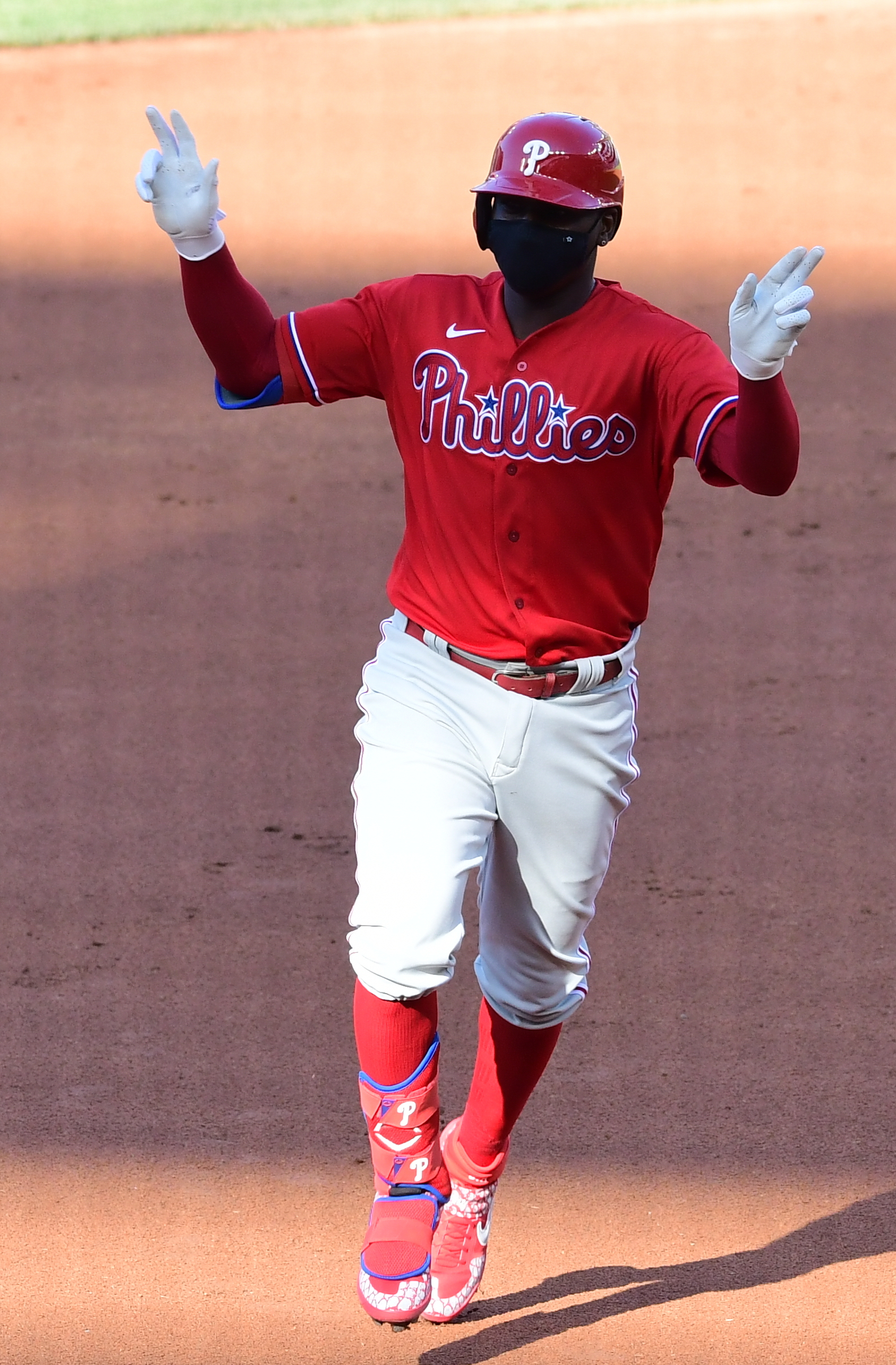
Gregorius in 2020

The Philadelphia Phillies signed Gregorius to a one-year, $14 million contract on December 16, 2019. He and pitcher Zack Wheeler were considered the team's most important free agent acquisitions of the offseason. The 2020 MLB season was delayed until July and shortened to 60 regular-season games due to the COVID-19 pandemic; Gregorius' kidney disorder meant that he was considered "high-risk" for the virus, and he had an opportunity to decline playing during the pandemic and decline $9 million of his one-year contract. Instead, Gregorius chose to play, wearing a face mask at all times on the field. Gregorius was a good addition for the Phillies in the pandemic-shortened season: among MLB shortstops, he was third in RBIs (40), fifth in hits (61) and home runs (10), and sixth in batting average (.286). Additionally, he hit .345 for the season with runners in scoring position.

The Phillies re-signed Gregorius to a two-year, $28 million contract on February 10, 2021. Due to the continued effects of the COVID-19 pandemic, Gregorius was one of seven Phillies who ran into visa issues and reported late to 2021 spring training. Manager Joe Girardi was unconcerned about Gregorius' late start to training camp, telling reporters, "I would expect that Didi's in pretty good shape because that's who he is and that's what I'm used to seeing." On March 29, Gregorius was named as the Phillies' starting shortstop for the 2021 season, sharing the middle infield with Jean Segura. On opening day, Gregorius made an over-the-shoulder catch to stop Ozzie Albies and help extend to extra innings, where the Phillies beat the Atlanta Braves 3–2. In mid-April, Gregorius injured his elbow while making a catch and missed three games due to swelling in the area. He initially avoided going on the injured list as doctors drained the elbow, but a recurrent swelling in mid-May forced him out of the lineup again. The elbow injury continued to hinder Gregorius through a series of rehab assignments with the Lehigh Valley IronPigs, and on June 16, he was diagnosed with pseudogout and was able to begin an appropriate treatment program. He returned to the lineup on July 2, after missing 41 games to the injury. In his first game off of the injured list, Gregorius hit a solo home run in the fifth inning of a 4–3 extra-innings win against the San Diego Padres. Gregorius proceeded to have the worst season of his MLB career, batting only .210 with a .667 on-base plus slugging (OPS) in his first 200 at bats following his stint on the injured list. He blamed his offensive difficulties on the effects of the COVID-19 vaccine, which he claimed led to his battle with pseudogout, a conclusion that doctors at the Children's Hospital of Philadelphia said was incorrect. Gregorius batted .209 in 103 games for the Phillies, with 13 home runs and 54 RBIs in 368 at bats in 2021. His offense did not improve in 2022, as he slashed .210/.263/.304. He was released by the Phillies on August 4, 2022.

=== Algodoneros de Unión Laguna ===
On May 1, 2023, Gregorius signed with the Algodoneros de Unión Laguna of the Mexican League. In 26 games for the Algodoneros, he hit .359/.431/.777 with 11 home runs and 34 RBI.

=== Seattle Mariners ===
On June 8, 2023, Gregorius signed a minor league contract with the Seattle Mariners. He joined the Triple-A Tacoma Rainiers at the end of June. In 25 games, he hit .192/.282/.337 with 3 home runs and 10 RBI. On August 2, Gregorius opted out of his contract and became a free agent.

=== Arabia Wolves ===
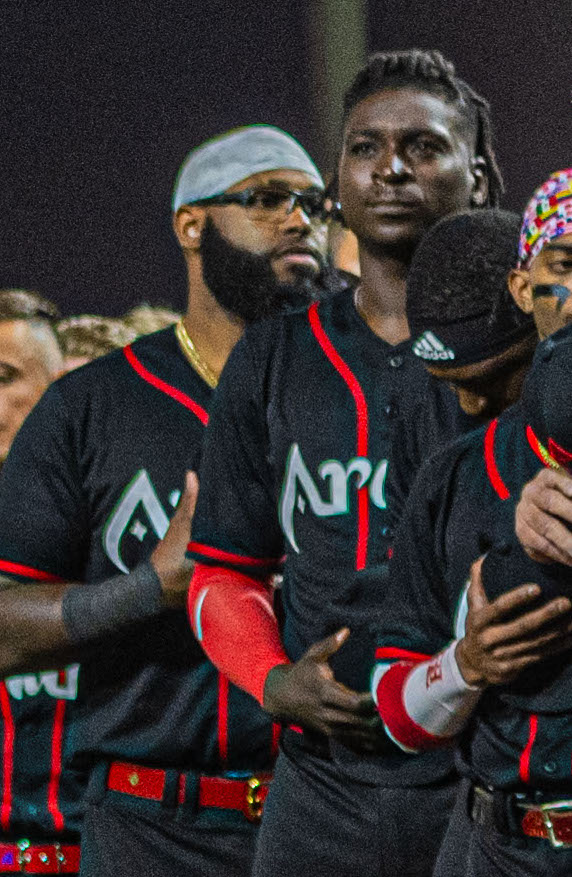
Gregorius and teammate Courtney Hawkins (left) with the Arabia Wolves in 2025

On October 23, 2023, Gregorius was selected third overall in the inaugural Baseball United draft by the Dubai Wolves. During the league's all-star showcase event in November 2023, Gregorius went a combined 2-for-8 with a double for the United West All-Stars.

=== Algodoneros de Unión Laguna (second stint) ===
On April 7, 2024, Gregorius signed again with the Algodoneros de Unión Laguna of the Mexican League. In 74 appearances for the Algodoneros, he hit .262/.363/.410 with seven home runs, 43 RBI, and six stolen bases.

Gregorius returned with Laguna for the 2025 season. In 50 games, he hit .288/.346/.389 with two home runs and two stolen bases.

Gregorius returned to Laguna in 2026. In 52 games, he batted .222/.335/.323 with three home runs, 18 RBI, and one stolen base. Following the season, Gregorius was released by the team on September 23, 2026.

== International career ==
Gregorius first played for the Netherlands national baseball team at the 2009 Baseball World Cup. At the 2011 Baseball World Cup, after the Netherlands defeated Cuba 2–1 in the final match, Gregorius and his teammates were knighted under the Order of Orange-Nassau, 5th class. Since then, Gregorius' official title is "Sir", which he has incorporated into his Twitter handle.

While working out to represent the Netherlands in the 2013 World Baseball Classic (WBC), Gregorius suffered a strained ulnar collateral ligament in his elbow, which kept him out of the tournament and much of spring training. Gregorius played in the 2017 WBC, serving primarily as a designated hitter on a Dutch national team with an ample selection of MLB shortstops. He hit well, batting .348 with one home run and eight RBIs, helping to take the Dutch team to the semifinals, before a hematoma of the subscapularis muscle in Gregorius' shoulder forced him to pull out of the tournament early.

Gregorius played for the Dutch in the 2023 WBC and 2024 WBSC Premier12. During the latter, he was named to the All-World Team as the best shortstop. He was named the most valuable player of the 2025 European Baseball Championship, batting .321 with one home run in 6 games as the Netherlands won the tournament in Rotterdam. In the 2026 WBC, Gregorius, playing third base as captain Xander Bogaerts played shortstop, batted 1-for-13 with a home run in five games.

Gregorius was named to the Curaçao Suns roster in the 2024 Caribbean Series in Miami.

== Personal life ==
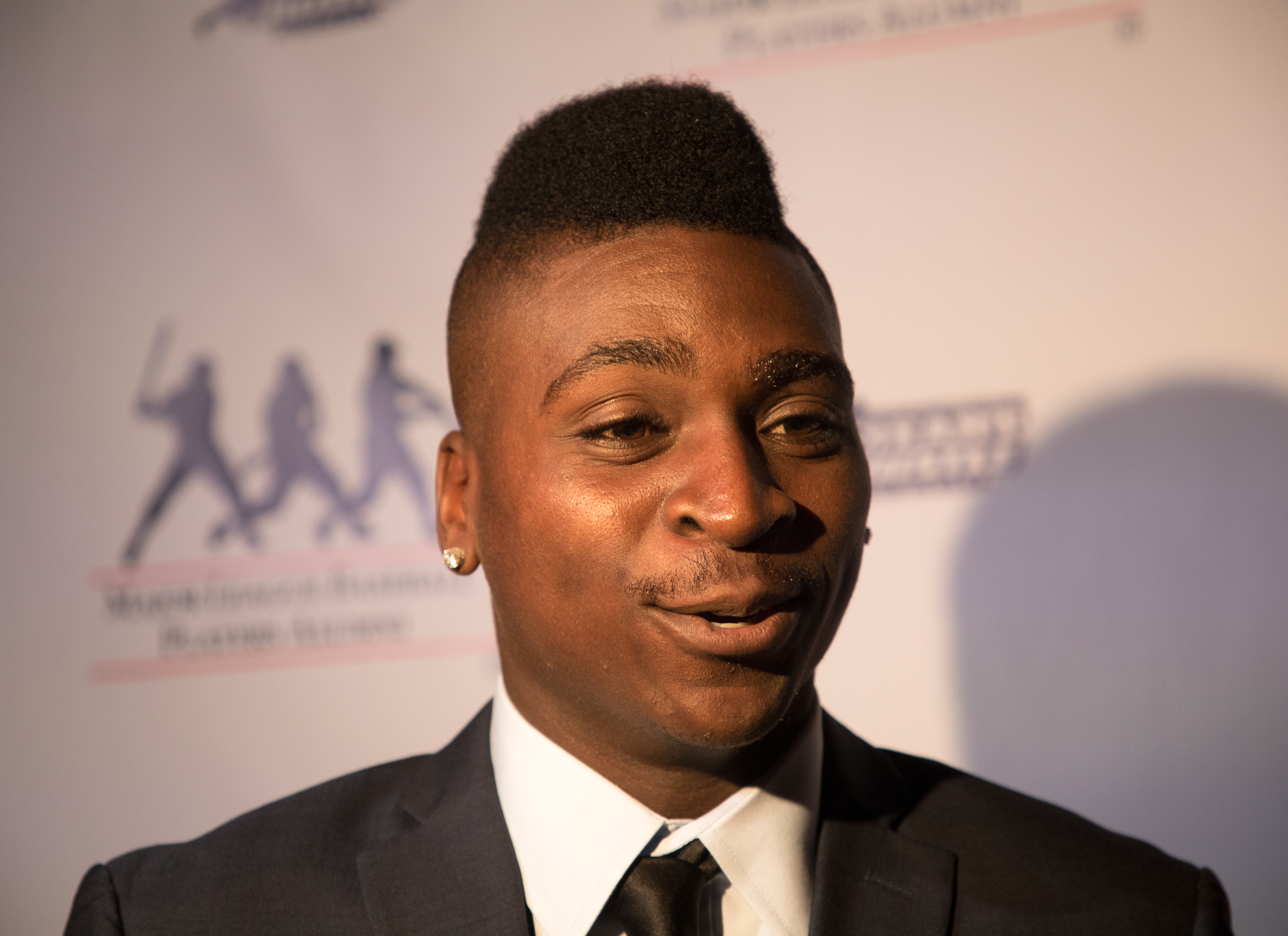
Gregorius at a charity event in 2016

Gregorius adopted the nickname "Didi" in 2009, when his American teammates had trouble pronouncing the name "Mariekson". His father and brother also go by "Didi". Gregorius, like many Curaçaoans, is fluent in four languages: English, Spanish, Dutch, and Papiamento. In his free time, he enjoys photography and drawing, and he picked up tattooing when the COVID-19 pandemic paused the 2020 MLB season.

While playing with the Yankees, Gregorius began to post "victory tweets" after every winning game, often accompanied by the hashtag "#startspreadingthenews". These tweets would often incorporate specific emojis that Gregorius had assigned to various teammates. Gregorius briefly stopped posting during the start of the 2019 season, while he was recovering from Tommy John surgery, because he "didn't want to make [the wins] all about me", but resumed when he was activated from the injured list. He continued the tradition after signing with the Phillies, telling reporters that he would "have new emojis" for his new teammates.

Gregorius has two children.
