= Kevin Kelly (pitcher, born 1990) =

Curaçaoan baseball player (born 1990)

Free agent
- Pitcher
- Born: May 27, 1990 (age 36); Willemstad, Curaçao
- Bats: Right Throws: Right
- Stats at Baseball Reference

Career highlights and awards
- Pitched a no-hitter on May 31, 2024 (LMB)
Medals
Men's baseball
Representing Netherlands
European Baseball Championship
Gold medal – first place	2014 Brno	National team
Gold medal – first place	2016 Hoofddorp	National team
Gold medal – first place	2019 Bonn	National team
Gold medal – first place	2021 Turin	National team
Bronze medal – third place	2023 Czechia	National team
Gold medal – first place	2025 Rotterdam	National team
Haarlem Baseball Week
Gold medal – first place	2014 Haarlem	National team
World Port Tournament
Silver medal – second place	2011 Netherlands	National team
Silver medal – second place	2013 Netherlands	National team
Silver medal – second place	2015 Netherlands	National team

Kevin Keary Kelly (born May 27, 1990) is a Dutch-Curaçaoan professional baseball pitcher who is a free agent. He played college baseball at Western Oklahoma State College and Southwestern Oklahoma State University and has played professionally in the Netherlands, Italy, and Mexico. He has pitched for the Netherlands national team in events beginning in 2010.

== Career ==
=== Neptunus ===
Kelly pitched for the Honkbal Hoofdklaase club Neptunus in Rotterdam from 2014–2017 and 2019–2023. He has a 19–7 win–loss record and 24 saves in 250 innings pitched.

=== Rimini Baseball Club ===
Kelly signed with the Rimini Baseball Club of the Italian Baseball League for the 2018 season. In 15 games for the club, he compiled a 1.72 ERA with 19 strikeouts and 3 saves across 15 2/3 innings pitched.

=== Sultanes de Monterrey ===
On April 17, 2024, Kelly signed with the Sultanes de Monterrey of the Mexican League. On May 31, Kelly threw a no-hitter against the Pericos de Puebla, striking out three as Monterrey won 12–0. In 16 games (11 starts) for the Sultanes, he compiled a 1–3 record and 4.67 ERA with 39 strikeouts across 52 innings pitched. Kelly was released by the team on September 23.

=== Dorados de Chihuahua ===
On October 14, 2024, Kelly signed with the Dorados de Chihuahua of the Mexican League. Kelly made 19 appearances (three starts) for Chihuahua in 2025, logging a 3–3 record and 9.47 ERA with 20 strikeouts across 25 2/3 innings pitched.

=== Caliente de Durango ===
On July 11, 2025, Kelly signed with the Caliente de Durango of the Mexican League. In six appearances (two starts) for Durango, he struggled to an 8.49 ERA with 13 strikeouts across 11 2/3 innings pitched. Kelly was released by the Caliente on December 18.

== International career ==
Kelly has played for the Netherlands national baseball team in several international tournaments, beginning with the 2010 Central American and Caribbean Games. He has also played in the 2011 World Port Tournament, 2013 World Port Tournament, 2014 Haarlem Baseball Week, 2015 World Port Tournament 2016 exhibition games against Japan, and 2017 World Baseball Classic. He also played for the Netherlands in the 2019 European Baseball Championship, Africa/Europe 2020 Olympic Qualification tournament in September 2019, 2019 WBSC Premier12, and 2023 World Baseball Classic.

Kelly was named the best pitcher of the 2025 European Championship, following his 8 1/3 inning, 16-strikeout relief appearance in a win over defending champion Spain in the semifinals. He had two saves earlier in the tournament.
