= Ty Kelly =

American-Israeli baseball player (born 1988)

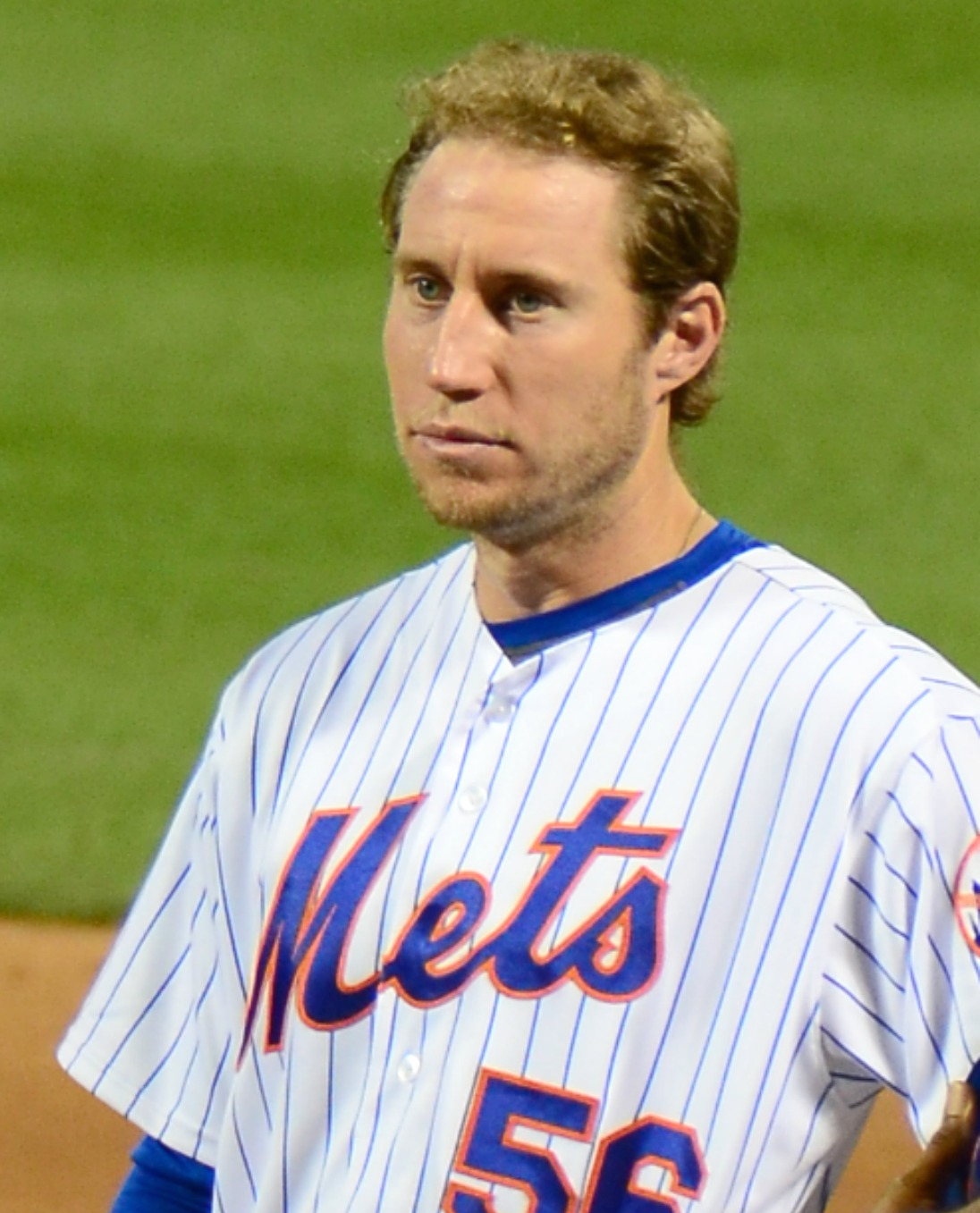
- Kelly with the New York Mets in 2016
- Utility player
- Born: July 20, 1988 (age 38); Dallas, Texas, U.S.
- Batted: Switch Threw: Right

MLB debut
- May 24, 2016, for the New York Mets

Last MLB appearance
- July 23, 2018, for the New York Mets

MLB statistics
- Batting average: .203
- Home runs: 3
- Runs batted in: 21
- Stats at Baseball Reference

Teams
- New York Mets (2016–2017); Philadelphia Phillies (2017); New York Mets (2018)
Medals
Men's baseball
Representing Israel
European Baseball Championship
Silver medal – second place	2021 Israel	Team

Tyler Patrick Kelly (Hebrew: טיי קלי; born July 20, 1988) is an American-Israeli former professional baseball utility player. He played in Major League Baseball (MLB) for the Philadelphia Phillies and New York Mets. He plays for Team Israel.

At the University of California, Davis, Kelly led the Big West Conference with a .397 batting average as a sophomore in 2008. That summer he was a 2008 Cape Cod League All Star playing for the Brewster Whitecaps. The Baltimore Orioles selected Kelly in the 13th round (386th overall) of the 2009 Major League Baseball draft. Kelly was a 2009 New York-Penn League All Star, a 2011 South Atlantic League All Star, a 2012 Carolina League All Star, and a 2013 Eastern League All Star.

The Mets promoted Kelly to the major leagues in his eighth pro season, in 2016, after 855 minor league games, and 3,063 minor league at bats. He was the starting third baseman for Team Israel at the 2017 World Baseball Classic. In April 2017, he was acquired by the Phillies, and in January 2018, he signed a contract to return to the Mets. In August 2019, Kelly announced his retirement from professional baseball.

In September 2019, he obtained Israeli citizenship. He played for Team Israel at the 2019 and 2023 European Baseball Championships. He also played for the team at the Africa/Europe 2020 Olympic Qualification tournament in Italy in September 2019, which Israel won to qualify to play baseball at the 2020 Summer Olympics. He played third base for Team Israel at the 2020 Summer Olympics in Tokyo in the summer of 2021, and tied for fourth-most at the Olympics with four walks. Kelly also played for Team Israel in the 2023 World Baseball Classic.

== Early life ==
Kelly was born in Dallas, Texas, the first child of Pat and Diane Kelly, and is Jewish. Ty Kelly's father is Catholic, and his mother is Jewish – by virtue of which he qualified to play for Team Israel. His father played both college basketball and baseball for the Colorado Buffaloes, before serving as an assistant baseball coach at San Joaquin Delta College. Ty Kelly is a vegan.

Kelly attended St. Mary's High School in Stockton, California, where he played both basketball and baseball, graduating in 2006. In baseball, he batted just under .400 as a senior, and received All-Tri-City Athletic League (TCAL) and all-area honors. In basketball, Kelly was named All-TCAL Defensive Player of the Year.

== College baseball ==
Kelly played his freshman year of college baseball for the Loyola Marymount Lions. He then transferred to the University of California, Davis, where he majored in Communications in his sophomore and junior years.

Kelly led the Big West Conference with a .397 batting average (BA) as a sophomore in 2008, and was # 2 in the Big West Conference in hits, with 94, playing for the Aggies. He helped the Aggies reach the NCAA Division I baseball tournament in their first year of eligibility.

In 2008, Kelly played collegiate summer baseball for the Brewster Whitecaps of the Cape Cod Baseball League, and was named a league all-star. He was on the Brooks Wallace Player of the Year Watch List in 2009, and batted .307 with 20 doubles (tied for 3rd in the Conference). His career batting average and hits total rank second and third, respectively, in Aggies history.

== Professional career ==
=== Baltimore Orioles ===
The Baltimore Orioles selected Kelly in the 13th round (386th overall) of the 2009 Major League Baseball Draft. He began his Minor League Baseball (MiLB) career that year as a third baseman and second baseman, with a .265 batting (BA) and 33 walks (BB) in 61 games, for the Short-Season A Aberdeen Ironbirds. Kelly was named a 2009 mid-season New York-Penn League All Star.

In 2010, Kelly played third base and second base for the Class-A Delmarva Shorebirds of the South Atlantic League; he batted .259 with 4 home runs (HR), 58 runs batted in (RBI), 30 doubles, 68 BB (5th in the league), and 11 sacrifice hits (3rd). In 2011, Kelly batted .274 with 4 home runs, 46 RBIs, and 67 walks (5th in the league) for Delmarva, primarily playing third base and left field. He was named a 2011 mid-season South Atlantic League All Star.

In 2012, Kelly hit a combined .327/.425/.467, with 11 HR, and 70 RBI, split between the Advanced-A Frederick Keys of the Carolina League – for whom he batted .346 (2nd in the league)/.460 (2nd)/.513 (8th) with 54 walks (5th), while primarily playing second base and third base; Double-A Bowie Baysox of the Eastern League (primarily playing third base and left field); and Triple-A Norfolk Tides of the International League (IL) (playing second base and third base). Kelly was named Player of the Week in the Carolina League on July 16, 2012. He was named a 2012 mid-season Carolina League All Star. Kelly was named an MiLB.com Organization All-Star in 2012, for both Baltimore and Seattle. For the season, he led Orioles minor-leaguers in hits, batting, and total bases, and was third in RBI.

=== Seattle Mariners ===
In 2013, Kelly hit .283 in 72 games for Bowie before being traded to the Seattle Mariners on June 30, for outfielder Eric Thames. He was named a 2013 mid-season Eastern League All Star. Kelly then batted .320/.456/.406, with 51 BB, in 54 games, for the Triple-A Tacoma Rainiers of the Pacific Coast League (PCL). His 5-walk game on August 16, 2013, tied a PCL single-game record.

On the season, Kelly batted .298/.417/.392 and recorded 85 runs, 27 doubles, and 102 walks (second in the minors, behind Greg Bird), in 126 games. He led the minor leagues in fewest swings-per-at-bat (at 30.8%). Kelly was named a 2013 Baseball America High Class A All Star, and a 2013 MiLB.com Organization All-Star for Seattle.

In returning to Tacoma for 2014, Kelly batted .263/.381 (10th in the league)/.412, with 15 homers, in 134 games; he started 64 games at second base, 36 games at third base, 15 games in right field, and 5 games in left field. Kelly ranked 2nd in the PCL with 85 walks (trailing only Joc Pederson of the Dodgers), 8th in runs (81), and placed in the top 5 in MiLB in fewest swings-per-at-bat (with 36.4%). He was named a 2014 MiLB.com Organization All-Star for Seattle.

=== St. Louis Cardinals ===
Kelly was traded to the St. Louis Cardinals for pitcher Sam Gaviglio on November 20, 2014. As a member of the Cardinals organization, Kelly played for the Triple–A Memphis Redbirds of the PCL and batted .203 in 79 games.

=== Toronto Blue Jays ===
On July 22, 2015, he was claimed off waivers by the Toronto Blue Jays, and optioned to the Triple-A Buffalo Bisons of the IL. Kelly was designated for assignment on August 29, and outrighted to the Bisons on August 31. He played in 117 games in 2015, batting .226, with 3 home runs, and 33 RBI. Kelly elected free agency on November 7.

Kelly's career minor league stat line includes a .275/.374/.380 batting average, 54 home runs, 482 RBI, 3,892 at bats, and 1,094 games played. He played 400 games at second base, 370 games at third base, 148 games in left field, 64 games in right field, 50 games at shortstop, 35 games in center field, 4 games at first base, and made 3 pitching appearances (3 innings in Triple-A).

=== New York Mets ===
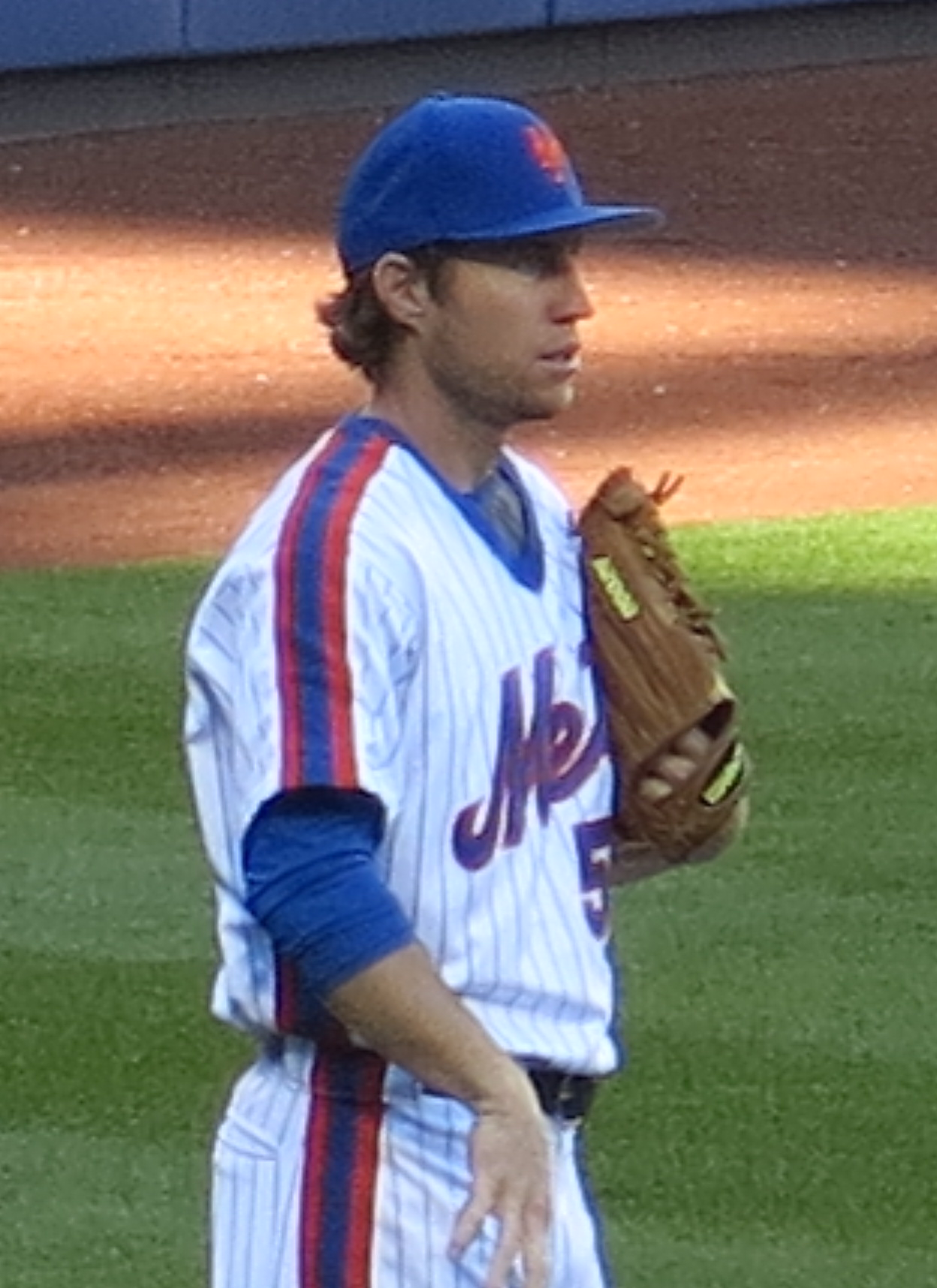
Kelly in 2016

On November 13, 2015, Kelly signed a minor league contract with the New York Mets that included an invitation to spring training. The Mets promoted Kelly to the major leagues on May 23, 2016, in his eighth pro season (after 855 minor league games, and 3,063 minor league at bats), to replace an injured Lucas Duda. At the time, he was leading the minor leagues with a .391 batting average and a .478 on base percentage.

Kelly made his major league debut starting at third base against the Washington Nationals on May 24. Kelly hit his first home run against Jameson Taillon on June 8 in Pittsburgh. In 2016, he had a 1.22 walks/strikeout ratio, the best in the major leagues, in 71 plate appearances.

He played 39 games for the Mets at six different positions, batted .241/.352/.345 in 58 at bats, and got a hit in his only postseason at bat, against four-time All Star Madison Bumgarner.

In February 2017, Kelly was outrighted to the Mets' Triple-A team and invited to major league spring training by the Mets.

In 2017, he made the New York Mets' opening day roster, and played in one game as a pinch hitter. Kelly was designated for assignment on April 8 in order to make room for pitcher Paul Sewald on the 25-man roster.

=== Toronto Blue Jays (second stint) ===
On April 10, 2017, the Toronto Blue Jays claimed Kelly off waivers from the New York Mets. Kelly was recalled by the Blue Jays on April 18 and placed on the team's 25-man roster, sat on the team's bench, and was then designated for assignment on April 21 without having appeared in a Major League game.

=== Philadelphia Phillies ===
On April 22, 2017, the Blue Jays sent Kelly to the Philadelphia Phillies, his third major league team of the season, for cash.

In 69 games, Kelly played second base, third base, and all three outfield positions, and batted .193 (.400 in extra inning games)/.260/.341 with 2 home runs and 14 RBIs in 88 at bats. On October 5, he elected to be a free agent.

=== New York Mets (second stint) ===
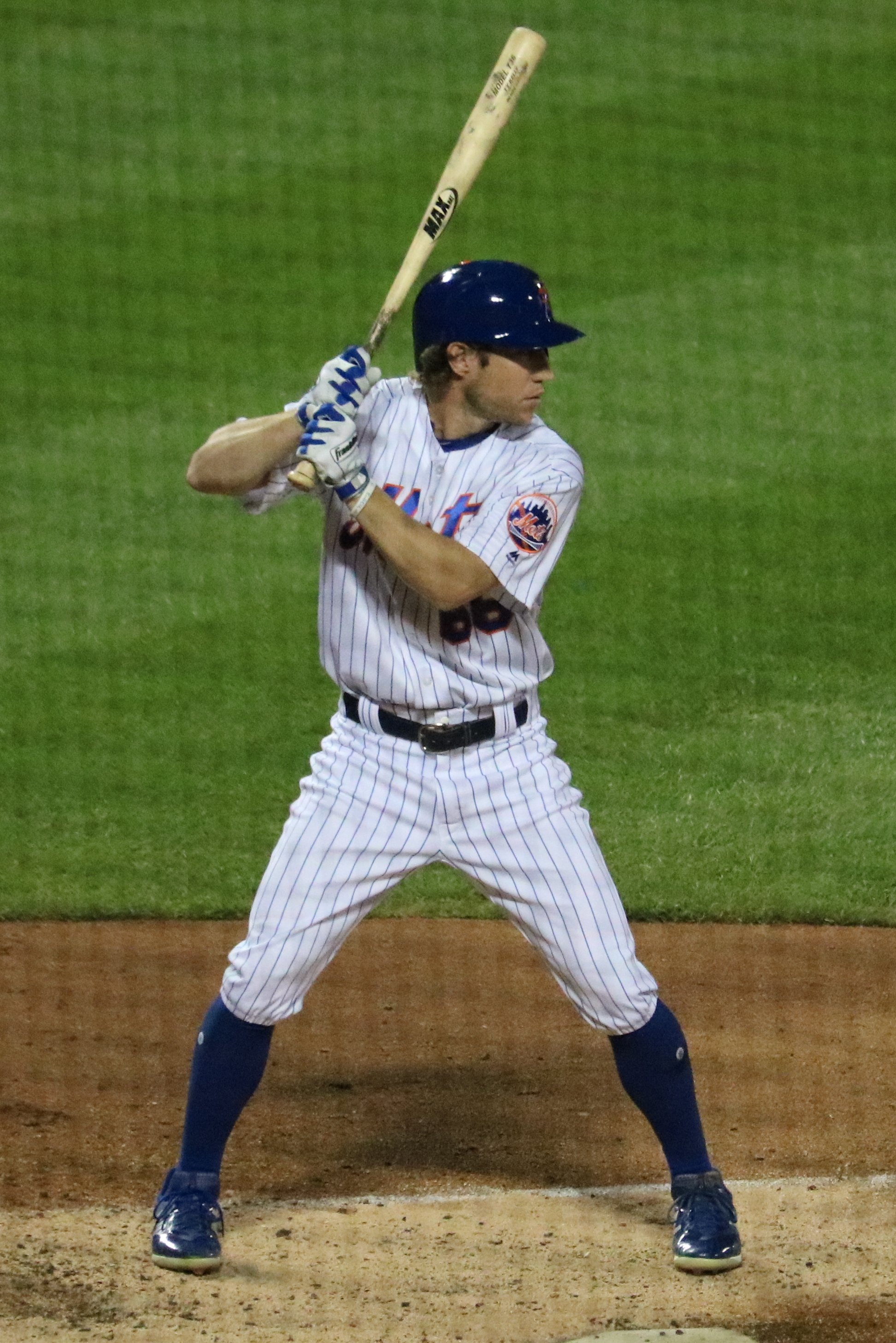
Kelly with the Mets in 2018

In January 2018, Kelly agreed to a minor league contract with the New York Mets, with an invitation to spring training. In July, Kelly was designated for assignment, cleared waivers, and accepted an assignment to AAA Las Vegas. In the 2018 season, he had 11 at bats for the major league team. On October 2, he elected to become a free agent.

As of the end of the 2018 season, Kelly had played every position in the minor leagues except catcher.

=== Los Angeles Angels ===
On February 5, 2019, Kelly signed a minor league contract with the Los Angeles Angels that included an invitation to spring training.

On August 25, 2019, Kelly announced his retirement from professional baseball. He humorously announced it on Twitter, as a four-time Pro Bowl football quarterback retired on the same day: "Andrew Luck trying to steal my retirement thunder. Let me have my moment, Andrew." Kelly finished his major league career having batted .203/.288/.323, with 3 home runs, and 21 RBI, in 158 at bats, over 118 games. He played 18 games at second base, 18 games in left field, 15 games at third base, 4 games in right field, 2 games in center field, and one game at first base.

=== Seattle Mariners (second stint) ===
On January 28, 2021, Kelly came out of retirement to sign with the Kansas City Monarchs of the American Association of Professional Baseball. On April 7, 2021, prior to the AA season, Kelly was traded from Kansas City to the Long Island Ducks of the Atlantic League of Professional Baseball in exchange for a PTBNL.

On May 22, 2021, prior to the start of the ALPB season, Kelly’s contract was selected by the Seattle Mariners organization. Kelly hit .227/.337/.333 with 2 home runs and 10 RBI in 24 games for the Triple-A Tacoma Rainiers. He was released by the Mariners organization on July 8.

=== Long Island Ducks ===
On August 13, 2021, Kelly signed with the Long Island Ducks of the Atlantic League of Professional Baseball. He batted .298/.431/.386 and stole five bases in six attempts over 114 at bats, as he played all outfield positions and all infield positions other than first base over 38 games. He became a free agent following the season.

=== Los Angeles Dodgers ===
On March 7, 2022, Kelly signed a minor league contract with the Los Angeles Dodgers. He played in 22 games for the Oklahoma City Dodgers and five for the Tulsa Drillers, hitting .152 between the two levels. Kelly was released on August 23.

== Coaching career ==
=== Seattle Mariners ===
On March 8, 2023, Kelly announced he would be joining the coaching staff of the Tacoma Rainiers, the Triple-A affiliate of the Seattle Mariners, following his participation in the 2023 World Baseball Classic.

=== Tampa Bay Rays ===
In 2025, Kelly was named hitting coach of the Florida Complex League Rays, the rookie-level affiliate of the Tampa Bay Rays.

== Team Israel; World Baseball Classic and Olympics ==
Kelly was originally scheduled to play for Israel at the 2017 World Baseball Classic qualifier in September 2016, but was called up to the Mets at the time, so he could not play. He started at third base for Team Israel at the 2017 World Baseball Classic in the main tournament, in March 2017.

After Israel – ranked #41 in the world – defeated third-ranked South Korea by a score of 2–1 in 10 innings in the first game, Kelly tweeted: "Definitely the most stressful game I've ever been a part of. But it was worth it." He wore an Israel Baseball band around his left wrist into the 2017 season. Later in 2017, playing at the Marlins when they held Jewish Heritage Day, Kelly said "I had tears in my eyes, hearing the Israel national anthem."

In September 2019, Kelly obtained Israeli citizenship and joined Team Israel for the 2019 European Baseball Championship in Germany in September 2019. His becoming Israeli made his Jewish grandmother, Gail, who lives in Boca Raton, Florida, very proud. Kelly said: "I mean, she loves being Jewish. She talks about her Jewish upbringing all the time, so this is really exciting for her."

He also played for the team at the Africa/Europe 2020 Olympic Qualification tournament in Italy in September 2019, which Israel won to qualify to play baseball at the 2020 Summer Olympics. Kelly played shortstop and batted .176/.300/.294 in the tournament.

Kelly played third base for Team Israel at the 2020 Summer Olympics in Tokyo in the summer of 2021, and tied for fourth-most at the Olympics with four walks. He batted 1-for-16, and played error-less defense.

Kelly played shortstop for Team Israel in the 2023 World Baseball Classic in Miami, in March 2023. He played for Team Israel manager and former All-Star Ian Kinsler, and alongside All-Star outfielder Joc Pederson and pitcher Dean Kremer, among others.

Kelly played third base and batted .222/.444/.278 for Team Israel in the 2023 European Baseball Championship in September 2023 in the Czech Republic.

== See also ==
- List of Jewish Major League Baseball players
