= Gabriele Quattrini =

Italian baseball player (born 1996)

Macerata – No. 18
- Pitcher
- Born: July 18, 1996 (age 30); Potenza Picena, Marche, Italy
- Bats: Right Throws: Right
Medals
Men's baseball
Representing Italy
European Baseball Championship
Silver medal – second place	2025 Netherlands	Team

Gabriele Quattrini (born 18 July 1996) is an Italian professional baseball pitcher. He plays with Macerata in the Italian Baseball League (Serie A), and has competed with the Italy national baseball team in international competitions such as the World Baseball Classic and the European Baseball Championship.

Quattrini was born to a baseball-playing family in Potenza Picena, where one of his older brothers founded the local baseball club (the Potenza Picena Panthers). He debuted with Macerata before signing with San Marino for the 2022 Serie A season. After winning the 2022 championship with San Marino, Quattrini returned to Macerata for the 2023 season.

Named to the Italian national team at the 2023 European Baseball Championship, Quattrini finished the tournament with an 8.10 earned run average. His performance at the 2025 European Baseball Championship was much improved, He threw seven scoreless innings with eight strikeouts in Italy's quarterfinal win over Germany, and made a scoreless relief appearance in the championship game against the Netherlands.

Quattrini played with Italy at the 2026 World Baseball Classic. Of the several native-born Italians that participated in the squad's pre-tournament training camp (which were also a preparation for the long-term international cycle, including the 2027 WBSC Premier12 and the 2028 Olympic Games), he was one of three to make the team's WBC roster, along with Sam Aldegheri and Claudio Scotti. He first took the mound in an exhibition game against the Netherlands in Fort Myers. He pitched 2.2 scoreless innings over two games in the tournament, and earned the win in Italy's 7–4 victory over Great Britain. where he struck out major leaguer Jazz Chisholm Jr. His appearance with the national team made headlines in his hometown, with the mayor issuing an official statement in Quattrini's honor.
