= Switzerland national baseball team =

Information
- Country: Switzerland
- Federation: Swiss Baseball and Softball Federation
- Confederation: WBSC Europe
- Manager: Martin Almstetter

WBSC ranking
- Current: 34 (31 December 2025)
- Highest: 34
- Lowest: 52 (2014)

European Championship
- Appearances: 2 (first in 2023)
- Best result: 11th (2025)

The Switzerland national baseball team is the national baseball team of Switzerland. The team competes in the bi-annual European Baseball Championship, first reaching the top level of the championship in 2023. The Swiss finished in 12th place in 2023 and 11th in 2025. James Sanders was one of the top pitchers in the 2023 tournament, throwing the most innings, 18 2/3, and tying for the lead with 2 wins. In 2025, teammates Hayden Jung-Goldberg & Marc Willi led the tournament with four stolen bases each.

The team also competed in Prague Baseball Week in 2025, going undefeated against three central and eastern European national teams.

Recently, the national team has featured several Swiss Americans who have played college baseball in the United States. This includes Hayden and Max Jung-Goldberg, who are also the grandsons of psychiatrist Carl Jung.

== Results ==
European Baseball Championship

Year	Position	Pld	W	L
2023	12th	6	2	4
2025	11th	6	3	3

== See also ==
- Baseball in Switzerland
