= Juremi Profar =

Curaçaoan baseball player (born 1996)

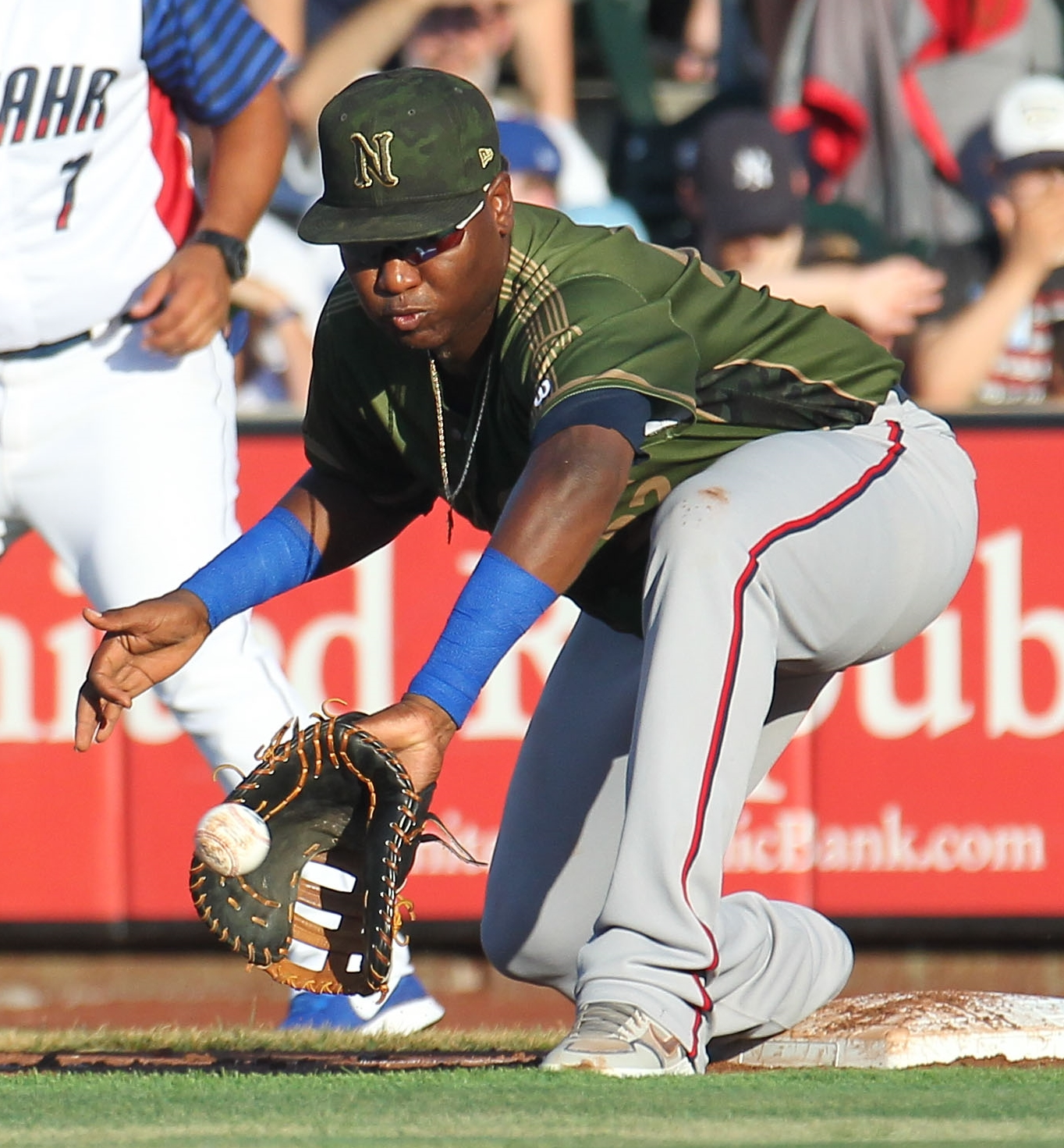
- Profar with the Nashville Sounds in 2019

Karachi Monarchs – No. 13
- Infielder
- Born: January 30, 1996 (age 30); Willemstad, Curaçao
- Bats: Right Throws: Right
- Stats at Baseball Reference
Medals
Men's baseball
Representing Netherlands
European Championship
Gold medal – first place	2021 Turin	Team
Gold medal – first place	2025 Rotterdam	Team
Bronze medal – third place	2023 Czechia	Team

Juremi Gregorius Profar (born January 30, 1996) is a Curaçaoan professional baseball infielder for the Karachi Monarchs of Baseball United. He played in Minor League Baseball from 2013 to 2019. He has played for the Netherlands in international competition.

== Early life ==
Profar represented Willemstad, Curaçao and Pabao Little League at the 2007 and 2008 Little League World Series. His brothers, Jurickson and Jurdrick, also represented the same Little League in the finals, Jurickson doing so in 2004 and 2005, followed later by Jurdrick in 2019.

== Professional career ==
=== Texas Rangers ===
Profar signed with the Texas Rangers as an international free agent on September 4, 2012. He made his professional debut in 2013 with the DSL Rangers, batting .281/.361/.350 with 44 RBI in 63 games. In 2014, he played for the Spokane Indians where he batted .247 with one home run and 36 RBI in 67 games. He also played in seven games for the Hickory Crawdads and two games for the Round Rock Express. Profar spent 2015 with the High Desert Mavericks and Hickory, where he compiled a .266 batting average with four home runs and 33 RBI in 77 games between both teams. In 2016, with High Desert he slashed .300/.355/.473 with 13 home runs, 58 RBI, and an .827 OPS in 103 games. In 2017 with the Frisco RoughRiders, he batted .263 with 10 home runs and 40 RBI in 109 games. Profar spent the 2018 season with Frisco, hitting .232/.283/.352 with 10 home runs and 51 RBI. Profar split the 2019 season between Frisco and the Triple-A Nashville Sounds, hitting a combined .265/.324/.394 with 10 home runs and 60 RBI. He elected free agency following the season on November 4, 2019.

=== Boston Red Sox ===
On November 22, 2019, Profar signed a minor league contract with the Boston Red Sox. He was released by the Red Sox on May 29, 2020, prior to the cancellation of the minor league season because of the COVID-19 pandemic.

=== Bravos de León ===
On February 17, 2022, Profar signed with the Bravos de León of the Mexican League. He appeared in 6 games for León, going 6-for-23 with 2 RBI. Profar was released by the club on May 23.

=== Marineros de Ensenada ===
Profar signed with the Marineros de Ensenada for the 2022 Liga Norte de México (LNM) season. He left the team towards the end of the regular season due to a commitment with the Netherlands national team, though he returned to the Marineros ahead of the championship series against the Freseros de San Quintín. Profar helped them win the LNM title after beating the Freseros in five games.

=== Québec Capitales ===
On February 14, 2023, Profar signed with the Québec Capitales of the Frontier League. He batted .276 with 14 home runs and 55 RBI in 93 games.

=== Karachi Monarchs ===
On October 23, 2023, Profar was selected in the sixth round by the Karachi Monarchs, with the 48th overall pick of the 2023 Baseball United inaugural draft.

=== Québec Capitales (second stint) ===
On April 23, 2024, Profar re-signed with the Québec Capitales of the Frontier League. In 14 games for Québec, he hit .263/.312/.333 with no home runs and six RBI. On May 29, the Capitales released Profar.

=== Hotsand Macerata Angels ===
On June 19, 2024, Profar signed with the Hotsand Macerata Angels of the Italian Baseball League.

=== Grosseto Baseball Club ===
On April 24, 2025, Profar signed with the Grosseto Baseball Club of the Italian Baseball League.

That winter, Profar was the MVP of the Curaçao Professional Baseball League for the Curaçao Goats.

=== Karachi Monarchs (second stint) ===
In October 2025, Profar signed with the Karachi Monarchs of Baseball United.

== International career ==
Profar played for the Netherlands at several international tournaments, including the 2019 WBSC Premier12, the 2023 World Baseball Classic (WBC), 2024 Haarlem Baseball Week, and several European Championships. He batted 2-for-4 with an RBI in the WBC.

Profar played third base and batted .609 with a .643 on base percentage with 14 hits (all leading the tournament) in 23 at bats for the Netherlands at the 2023 European Championship in the Czech Republic. At the 2025 European Championship, he played first base and batted .308 with 1 home run in 6 games as his team won the championship in Rotterdam.

== Personal life ==
Profar's older brother is All-Star Jurickson Profar, who signed with the Rangers in 2009. Their younger brother Jurdrick Profar signed his first professional contract with the Chicago White Sox in 2024.
