= 1954 European Baseball Championship =

Tournament details
- Country: Belgium
- City: Antwerp
- Dates: 26–27 June 1954
- Teams: 4

Final positions
- Champions: Italy (1st title)
- Runners-up: Spain
- Third place: Belgium
- Fourth place: West Germany

Tournament statistics
- Games played: 4

The 1954 European Baseball Championship was the first European championship in baseball. It featured four of the five member countries of the new Confederation of European Baseball, as France failed to field a team. The Netherlands, which would dominate the event in the coming decades, was not yet a part of the European federation due to financial difficulties in its national federation. The championship was held on June 26 and June 27 at a General Motors-owned field in Antwerp, Belgium. A messy affair, each game averaged more than 10 errors per game. Italy took gold, beating Belgium 6–1 and Spain 7–4. Italy's Giulio Glorioso won the championship game, pitching five scoreless innings before allowing four runs on three errors in his final inning against Spain. Spain won silver after committing 8 errors in its loss to Italy. Spain beat West Germany 10–4 in its first game. Belgium earned bronze, beating last-place Germany 12–5 in the highest-scoring game of the tournament.

== Matches ==
The tournament was played in a knockout system, with all four teams playing two games.

Semi-finals
26 June
Italy	6
Belgium	1
26 June
Spain	10
West Germany	4

Final
27 June
Italy	7
Spain	4
Third place
27 June
Belgium	12
West Germany	5

== Standings ==
Pos.	Team	Record	RS	RA
1	Italy	2–0	13	5
2	Spain	1–1	14	11
3	Belgium	1–1	13	11
4	West Germany	0–1	9	22
