= Jake Esch =

American baseball player (born 1990)

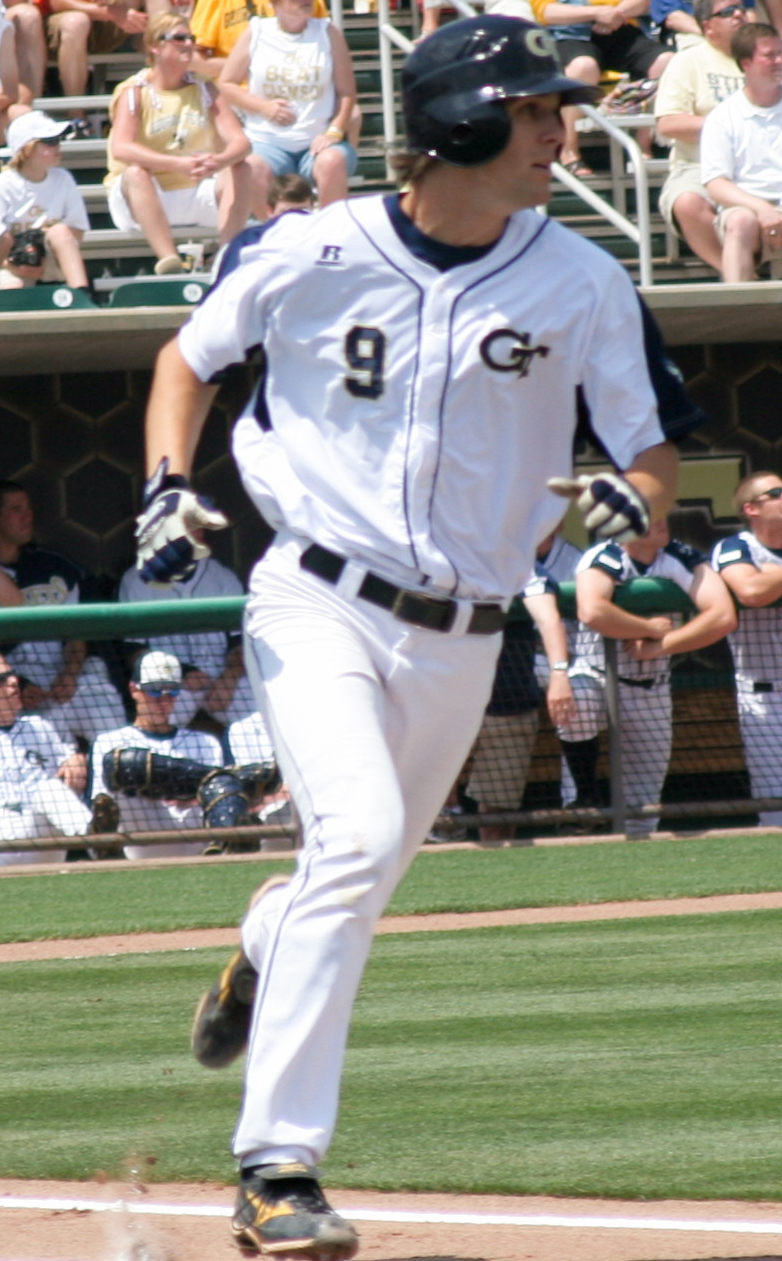
- Esch with Georgia Tech in 2010
- Pitcher
- Born: March 27, 1990 (age 36); Saint Paul, Minnesota, U.S.
- Batted: Right Threw: Right

MLB debut
- August 31, 2016, for the Miami Marlins

Last MLB appearance
- April 12, 2017, for the San Diego Padres

MLB statistics
- Win–loss record: 0–1
- Earned run average: 5.54
- Strikeouts: 10
- Stats at Baseball Reference

Teams
- Miami Marlins (2016); San Diego Padres (2017)
Medals
Men's baseball
Representing Great Britain
European Championship
| Silver medal – second place | 2023 Czechia | Team |

Jacob Otto Esch (born March 27, 1990) is an American former professional baseball pitcher. He played in Major League Baseball (MLB) for the Miami Marlins and San Diego Padres. He has played for the Great Britain national baseball team.

== Career ==
=== Florida/Miami Marlins ===
Esch attended Cretin-Derham Hall High School. He then enrolled at the Georgia Institute of Technology, where he played college baseball for the Georgia Tech Yellow Jackets. A pitcher in his freshman year, Esch became a second baseman as a sophomore. The Florida Marlins selected Esch in the 11th round of the 2011 Major League Baseball draft as a pitcher. He pitched for the Jamestown Jammers of the Low–A New York–Penn League after he signed.

In 2012, he pitched for Jamestown and the Greensboro Grasshoppers of the Single–A South Atlantic League, In 2013 and 2014, he pitched for the Jupiter Hammerheads of the High–A Florida State League. On November 20, 2015, the Marlins added Esch to their 40-man roster to protect him from the Rule 5 draft.

Esch began the 2016 season with the Jacksonville Suns of the Double–A Southern League, and was promoted to the New Orleans Zephyrs of the Triple–A Pacific Coast League. The Marlins promoted Esch to the major leagues on August 31, 2016.

=== San Diego Padres ===
On March 31, 2017, the San Diego Padres claimed Esch off of waivers from the Marlins. He was designated for assignment by the Padres on June 11, following the promotion of Phil Maton. He was released by the Padres the following day.

On June 21, 2017, Esch re–signed with the Padres on a minor league contract. He appeared in the minor leagues for the rookie–level Arizona League Padres, High–A Lake Elsinore Storm, Double–A San Antonio Missions, and Triple–A El Paso Chihuahuas. In 15 total games (13 starts), he registered a cumulative 1–9 record and 4.62 ERA with 60 strikeouts in 85 2/3 innings pitched. He elected free agency following the season on November 6.

=== St. Paul Saints ===
On April 16, 2018, Esch signed with the St. Paul Saints of the American Association of Professional Baseball.

=== Sioux Falls Canaries ===
On July 1, 2018, Esch signed with the Sioux Falls Canaries of the American Association.

== International career ==
Born in the United States, Esch is of English descent through his mother with roots in St Austell, Cornwall. He played for the Great Britain national baseball team at the 2023 World Baseball Classic.
