= 2023 European Baseball Championship =

Tournament details
- Country: Czech Republic
- Dates: 24 September – 1 October
- Teams: 16
- Defending champions: Netherlands

Final positions
- Champions: Spain (2nd title)
- Runners-up: Great Britain
- Third place: Netherlands
- Fourth place: Germany

Tournament statistics
- Games played: 48
- Attendance: 23,438 (488 per game)

Awards
- MVP: (Spain) Wander Encarnación

The 2023 European Baseball Championship was an international baseball tournament organized by WBSC Europe. It was held in five cities in the Czech Republic, from September 24 to October 1, 2023. The championship marked the first time in history, excluding three occasions when they did not enter the tournament, that the Netherlands did not feature in the final, having lost 7–6 to Spain in the semi-finals.

== Qualification ==
The top 14 teams of the 2021 European Championship qualified automatically for the tournament. After the expulsion of Russia, who had finished 10th, due to the Russian invasion of Ukraine, the remaining three spots were filled through a qualification tournament, that saw Hungary, France, and Switzerland qualify. Slovakia was the only team from the 2021 championship that did not qualify in 2023.

Team	Qualification method	Team	Qualification method
Netherlands	(gold) 2021 European Baseball Championship	Germany	9th, 2021 European Baseball Championship
Israel	(silver) 2021 European Baseball Championship	Austria	11th, 2021 European Baseball Championship
Italy	(bronze) 2021 European Baseball Championship	Sweden	12th, 2021 European Baseball Championship
Spain	4th, 2021 European Baseball Championship	Ukraine	13th, 2021 European Baseball Championship
Czech Republic	5th, 2021 European Baseball Championship	Greece	14th, 2021 European Baseball Championship
Great Britain	6th, 2021 European Baseball Championship	Hungary	Qualifier tournament winner
Croatia	7th, 2021 European Baseball Championship	France	Qualifier tournament winner
Belgium	8th, 2021 European Baseball Championship	Switzerland	Qualifier tournament winner

== Venues ==
The tournament took place in six different stadiums across the Czech Republic.

Prague	Třebíč	Brno	Brno
Eagles Park	Stadion Na Hvězdě	Sports area Hroch	YD Baseball Arena
Matches: 6	Matches: 10	Matches: 6	Matches: 14 (including final)
Ostrava	2023 Baseball European Championship venues		Blansko
Arrows Park	2023 Baseball European Championship venues		Strawberry Field
Matches: 6	2023 Baseball European Championship venues		Matches: 6

== Group stage ==
The top two teams of each group advanced to the quarter-finals. The bottom two teams entered the 9th–16th place play-offs.

All times are local, CEST (UTC+2).

=== Group A ===
Pos	Team	Pld	W	L	RF	RA	RD	PCT	GB	Qualification	(Spain)	(Czech Republic)	(Greece)	(Austria)
1	Spain	3	3	0	36	2	+34	1.000	—	Qualified for Quarterfinals	—	9–0	14–1	—
2	Czech Republic (H)	3	2	1	23	9	+14	.667	1	Qualified for Quarterfinals	—	—	14–0	9–0
3	Greece	3	1	2	12	34	−22	.333	2	Qualified for Relegation Round	—	—	—	11–6
4	Austria	3	0	3	7	33	−26	.000	3	Qualified for Relegation Round	1–13	—	—	—

(H) Hosts

24 September 2023; 11:00	Greece	1–14 (F/7)	Spain	Arrows Park, Ostrava; Attendance: 173; Umpires: Mojmír Jankovič (HP), Fabien Carrette-Legrand (1B), Tiska Tiihonen (3B)
24 September 2023; 11:00	LP: Dimitrios Kourtis (0–1)	Boxscore	WP: Anderson de León (1–0)	Arrows Park, Ostrava; Attendance: 173; Umpires: Mojmír Jankovič (HP), Fabien Carrette-Legrand (1B), Tiska Tiihonen (3B)
24 September 2023; 11:00	HR: Kasey Caras (1)	Boxscore	HR: Omar Hernandez (1), Gabriel Lino (1), Edison Valerio (1)	Arrows Park, Ostrava; Attendance: 173; Umpires: Mojmír Jankovič (HP), Fabien Carrette-Legrand (1B), Tiska Tiihonen (3B)

24 September 2023; 18:00	Austria	0–9	Czech Republic	Arrows Park, Ostrava; Attendance: 1,980; Umpires: Christopher Feuerecker (HP), Richard Wessel (1B), Fabien Carrette-Legrand (3B)
24 September 2023; 18:00	LP: Christian Tomsich (0–1)	Boxscore	WP: Tomáš Ondra (1–0)	Arrows Park, Ostrava; Attendance: 1,980; Umpires: Christopher Feuerecker (HP), Richard Wessel (1B), Fabien Carrette-Legrand (3B)
24 September 2023; 18:00		Boxscore	HR: Matěj Menšík (1), Martin Červenka (1)	Arrows Park, Ostrava; Attendance: 1,980; Umpires: Christopher Feuerecker (HP), Richard Wessel (1B), Fabien Carrette-Legrand (3B)

25 September 2023; 11:00	Spain	13–1 (F/8)	Austria	Arrows Park, Ostrava; Attendance: 312; Umpires: Fabien Carrette-Legrand (HP), Tiska Tiihonen (1B), Mojmír Jankovič(3B)
25 September 2023; 11:00	WP: Jorge Balboa (1–0)	Boxscore	LP: Julian Faulhaber (0–1)	Arrows Park, Ostrava; Attendance: 312; Umpires: Fabien Carrette-Legrand (HP), Tiska Tiihonen (1B), Mojmír Jankovič(3B)
25 September 2023; 11:00	HR: Andrés Angulo (1), Edison Valerio (2)	Boxscore		Arrows Park, Ostrava; Attendance: 312; Umpires: Fabien Carrette-Legrand (HP), Tiska Tiihonen (1B), Mojmír Jankovič(3B)

25 September 2023; 17:40	Greece	0–14 (F/7)	Czech Republic	Arrows Park, Ostrava; Attendance: 1,576; Umpires: Richard Wessel (HP), Christopher Feuerecker (1B), Tiska Tiihonen (3B)
25 September 2023; 17:40	LP: Jonathan Kountis (0–1)	Boxscore	WP: Ondřej Satoria (1–0)	Arrows Park, Ostrava; Attendance: 1,576; Umpires: Richard Wessel (HP), Christopher Feuerecker (1B), Tiska Tiihonen (3B)
25 September 2023; 17:40		Boxscore	HR: Eric Sogard (1), William Escala (1)	Arrows Park, Ostrava; Attendance: 1,576; Umpires: Richard Wessel (HP), Christopher Feuerecker (1B), Tiska Tiihonen (3B)

26 September 2023; 11:00	Austria	6–11	Greece	Arrows Park, Ostrava; Attendance: 286; Umpires: Tiska Tiihonen (HP), Mojmír Jankovič (1B), Richard Wessel (3B)
26 September 2023; 11:00	LP: Ryan Rupp (0–1)	Boxscore	WP: Peter Maestrales (1–0); Sv: Dimitri Lettas (1)	Arrows Park, Ostrava; Attendance: 286; Umpires: Tiska Tiihonen (HP), Mojmír Jankovič (1B), Richard Wessel (3B)
26 September 2023; 11:00	HR: Sammy Hackl (1), Felix Zimmerle (1)	Boxscore	HR: Kasey Caras (2), Panagiotis Dudunakis (1), Ari Sechopoulos (1)	Arrows Park, Ostrava; Attendance: 286; Umpires: Tiska Tiihonen (HP), Mojmír Jankovič (1B), Richard Wessel (3B)

26 September 2023; 17:40	Czech Republic	0–9	Spain	Arrows Park, Ostrava; Attendance: 2,017; Umpires: Christopher Feuerecker (HP), Richard Wessel (1B), Fabien Carrette-Legrand (3B)
26 September 2023; 17:40	LP: Marek Minařík (0–1)	Boxscore	WP: Pablo Guillén (1–0)	Arrows Park, Ostrava; Attendance: 2,017; Umpires: Christopher Feuerecker (HP), Richard Wessel (1B), Fabien Carrette-Legrand (3B)
26 September 2023; 17:40		Boxscore	HR: Gabriel Lino (2), Wander Encarnación (1), Omar Hernandez (2)	Arrows Park, Ostrava; Attendance: 2,017; Umpires: Christopher Feuerecker (HP), Richard Wessel (1B), Fabien Carrette-Legrand (3B)

=== Group B ===
Pos	Team	Pld	W	L	RF	RA	RD	PCT	GB	Qualification	(United Kingdom)	(Sweden)	(Italy)	(Hungary)
1	Great Britain	3	3	0	37	13	+24	1.000	—	Qualified for Quarterfinals	—	4–0	—	22–3
2	Sweden	3	2	1	25	14	+11	.667	1	Qualified for Quarterfinals	—	—	8–3	—
3	Italy	3	1	2	28	21	+7	.333	2	Qualified for Relegation Round	10–11	—	—	15–2
4	Hungary	3	0	3	12	54	−42	.000	3	Qualified for Relegation Round	—	7–17	—	—

24 September 2023; 11:00	Hungary	2–15 (F/7)	Italy	Třebíč Na Hvězdě, Třebíč; Attendance: 168; Umpires: Edwin Louisa (HP), Sergii Bolilyi (1B), Jason Lillebo (3B)
24 September 2023; 11:00	LP: Sean Fekete (0–1)	Boxscore	WP: Mattia Aldegheri (1–0)	Třebíč Na Hvězdě, Třebíč; Attendance: 168; Umpires: Edwin Louisa (HP), Sergii Bolilyi (1B), Jason Lillebo (3B)

24 September 2023; 17:30	Sweden	0–4	Great Britain	Třebíč Na Hvězdě, Třebíč; Attendance: 183; Umpires: Vladimir Richter (HP), Alex Lazaro (1B), Sergii Bolilyi (3B)
24 September 2023; 17:30	LP: Benjamin Johnson (0–1)	Boxscore	WP: Austin Hassani (1–0)	Třebíč Na Hvězdě, Třebíč; Attendance: 183; Umpires: Vladimir Richter (HP), Alex Lazaro (1B), Sergii Bolilyi (3B)

25 September 2023; 11:00	Hungary	3–22 (F/5)	Great Britain	Třebíč Na Hvězdě, Třebíč; Attendance: 190; Umpires: Sergii Bolilyi (HP), Jason Lillebo (1B), Edwin Louisa (3B)
25 September 2023; 11:00	LP: Ádám Piros (0–1)	Boxscore	WP: Jacob Esch (1–0)	Třebíč Na Hvězdě, Třebíč; Attendance: 190; Umpires: Sergii Bolilyi (HP), Jason Lillebo (1B), Edwin Louisa (3B)
25 September 2023; 11:00		Boxscore	HR: Nick Ward (1)	Třebíč Na Hvězdě, Třebíč; Attendance: 190; Umpires: Sergii Bolilyi (HP), Jason Lillebo (1B), Edwin Louisa (3B)

25 September 2023; 17:30	Italy	3–8	Sweden	Třebíč Na Hvězdě, Třebíč; Attendance: 260; Umpires: Alex Lazaro (HP), Vladimir Richter (1B), Jason Lillebo (3B)
25 September 2023; 17:30	LP: Gabriele Quattrini (0–1)	Boxscore	WP: Per Sjörs (1–0)	Třebíč Na Hvězdě, Třebíč; Attendance: 260; Umpires: Alex Lazaro (HP), Vladimir Richter (1B), Jason Lillebo (3B)
25 September 2023; 17:30		Boxscore	HR: Joel Johnson (1)	Třebíč Na Hvězdě, Třebíč; Attendance: 260; Umpires: Alex Lazaro (HP), Vladimir Richter (1B), Jason Lillebo (3B)

26 September 2023; 11:00	Sweden	17–7 (F/8)	Hungary	Třebíč Na Hvězdě, Třebíč; Attendance: 82; Umpires: Jason Lillebo (HP), Edwin Louisa (1B), Alex Lazaro (3B)
26 September 2023; 11:00	WP: Oskar Syrén (1–0)	Boxscore	LP: Robert Ogg	Třebíč Na Hvězdě, Třebíč; Attendance: 82; Umpires: Jason Lillebo (HP), Edwin Louisa (1B), Alex Lazaro (3B)
26 September 2023; 11:00	HR: Leonard Bäckström (1)	Boxscore	HR: Graeham Luttor (1)	Třebíč Na Hvězdě, Třebíč; Attendance: 82; Umpires: Jason Lillebo (HP), Edwin Louisa (1B), Alex Lazaro (3B)

26 September 2023; 17:30	Great Britain	11–10	Italy	Třebíč Na Hvězdě, Třebíč; Attendance: 360; Umpires: Sergii Bolilyi (HP), Alex Lazaro(1B), Vladimir Richter (3B)
26 September 2023; 17:30	WP: Chris Messer (1–0); Sv: Demoi Hodge (1)	Boxscore	LP: Alex Bassani (0–1)	Třebíč Na Hvězdě, Třebíč; Attendance: 360; Umpires: Sergii Bolilyi (HP), Alex Lazaro(1B), Vladimir Richter (3B)
26 September 2023; 17:30	HR: Nick Ward (2), Harry Ford (1, 2)	Boxscore	HR: Robel Garcia (1, 2)	Třebíč Na Hvězdě, Třebíč; Attendance: 360; Umpires: Sergii Bolilyi (HP), Alex Lazaro(1B), Vladimir Richter (3B)

=== Group C ===
Pos	Team	Pld	W	L	RF	RA	RD	PCT	GB	Qualification	(Netherlands)	(France)	(Croatia)	(Ukraine)
1	Netherlands	3	3	0	40	5	+35	1.000	—	Qualified for Quarterfinals	—	9–0	15–2	—
2	France	3	2	1	13	10	+3	.667	1	Qualified for Quarterfinals	—	—	—	10–0
3	Croatia	3	1	2	14	19	−5	.333	2	Qualified for Relegation Round	—	1–3	—	11–1
4	Ukraine	3	0	3	4	37	−33	.000	3	Qualified for Relegation Round	3–16	—	—	—

=== Group D ===
Pos	Team	Pld	W	L	RF	RA	RD	PCT	GB	Qualification	(Germany)	(Israel)	(Switzerland)	(Belgium)
1	Germany	3	3	0	32	9	+23	1.000	—	Qualified for Quarterfinals	—	2–0	—	—
2	Israel	3	2	1	25	11	+14	.667	1	Qualified for Quarterfinals	—	—	14–1	11–8
3	Switzerland	3	1	2	13	31	−18	.333	2	Qualified for Relegation Round	5–15	—	—	—
4	Belgium	3	0	3	14	33	−19	.000	3	Qualified for Relegation Round	4–15	—	2–7	—

== Play-offs ==
Quarter-finals
28 September, 12:00
D1 Germany	6
C2 France	5
28 September, 18:30
B1 Great Britain	12
A2 Czech Republic	2
28 September, 18:30
C1 Netherlands	12
D2 Israel	2
28 September, 12:00
A1 Spain	18
B2 Sweden	3

Semi-finals
29 September, 12:00
Germany	4
Great Britain	8
29 September, 18:30
Netherlands	6
Spain	7

Final
1 October, 18:30
Great Britain	2
Spain	11
3rd Place
1 October, 12:00
Germany	4
Netherlands	5

=== Placement round 5th–8th place ===
Classification games
29 September, 18:30
France	1
Czech Republic	11
29 September, 12:00
Israel	6
Sweden	4

5th place
30 September, 18:30
Czech Republic	5
Israel	1
7th place
30 September, 12:00
France	13
Sweden	0

== Relegation rounds ==
Relegation round
28 September, 10:00
D3 Switzerland	9
A4 Austria	2
28 September, 12:00
B3 Italy	15
C4 Ukraine	0
28 September, 15:00
A3 Greece	4
D4 Belgium	5
28 September, 18:30
C3 Croatia	9
B4 Hungary	2

9–12th places
29 September, 12:00
Switzerland	3
Italy	12
29 September, 18:30
Belgium	5
Croatia	7

9th place
30 September, 18:30
Italy	6
Croatia	5
11th place
30 September, 12:00
Switzerland	3
Belgium	8

=== 13–16th places classification ===
13–16th places
29 September, 10:00
Austria	0
Ukraine	9
29 September, 15:00
Greece	19
Hungary	14

13th place
30 September, 15:00
Ukraine	4
Greece	8
15th place
30 September, 10:00
Austria	15
Hungary	5

== Final standings ==
Rk	Team	W	L	Pct.	R	RA
1st place, gold medalist(s)	Spain	6	0	1.000	72	13
2nd place, silver medalist(s)	Great Britain	5	1	.833	59	30
3rd place, bronze medalist(s)	Netherlands	5	1	.833	63	18
4	Germany	4	2	.667	46	23
5	Czech Republic	4	2	.667	41	23
6	Israel	3	3	.500	34	32
7	France	3	3	.500	32	27
8	Sweden	2	4	.333	32	51
9	Italy	4	2	.667	61	29
10	Croatia	3	3	.500	35	32
11	Belgium	2	4	.333	32	47
12	Switzerland	2	4	.333	28	53
13	Greece	3	3	.500	43	57
14	Ukraine^	1	5	.167	17	60
15	Austria^	1	5	.167	24	56
16	Hungary^	0	6	.000	33	97

^ - Relegated to B Pool European Qualifier

== Awards and honors ==
=== Awards ===
Award	Player	Ref.
Most Valuable Player	(Spain) Wander Encarnación	
Leading hitter	(Hungary) Graeham Luttor	
Outstanding defensive player	(Netherlands) Didi Gregorius	

=== Statistical leaders ===
Batting leaders
Statistic	Name	Total
Batting average	(Netherlands) Juremi Profar	.609
Hits	(Netherlands) Juremi Profar	14
Runs	(Spain) Omar Hernández	10
Home runs	(Spain) Omar Hernández	4
Home runs	(United Kingdom) Nick Ward	4
Runs batted in	(United Kingdom) Harry Ford	12
Stolen bases	(United Kingdom) Harry Ford	5
Bases on balls	(Netherlands) Didi Gregorius	9
Bases on balls	(Germany) Shawn Larry	9
On base percentage	(Netherlands) Juremi Profar	.643
Slugging percentage	(United Kingdom) Nick Ward	1.190

Pitching leaders
Statistic	Name	Total
Wins	6 tied with (Note: Chris Messer (GBR), Carlos Garcia (CRO), Tomáš Ondra (CZE), James Sanders (SUI), Ondřej Satoria (CZE), Pablo Guillen (ESP))	2
Earned run average	3 tied with (Note: Ben Couvreur (FRA), Tomáš Ondra (CZE), Joseph King (GBR))	0.00
Innings pitched	(Switzerland) James Sanders	18 1/3
Strikeouts	(Croatia) Carlos Garcia	25
Saves	(Greece) Dimitri Lettas	2

=== Home runs ===
There were 74 home runs hit in 48 games, for an average of 1.54 home runs per game.

4 home runs

- (United Kingdom) Nick Ward
- (Spain) Omar Hernandez

3 home runs

- (Czech Republic) Martin Červenka
- (United Kingdom) Harry Ford
- (Netherlands) Juremi Profar

2 home runs

- (Belgium) Drew Janssen
- (Croatia) Philip Smith
- (Czech Republic) Eric Sogard
- (Germany) Vincent Ahrens
- (United Kingdom) Shamoy Christopher
- (Greece) Kasey Caras
- (Hungary) Graeham Luttor
- (Italy) Robel García
- (Netherlands) Ray-Patrick Didder
- (Netherlands) Sicnarf Loopstok
- (Netherlands) Dashenko Ricardo
- (Spain) Engel Beltré
- (Spain) Wander Encarnación
- (Spain) Gabriel Lino
- (Spain) Edgar Rondón
- (Spain) Edison Valerio
- (Switzerland) Noah Williamson

1 home run

- (Austria) Sammy Hackl
- (Austria) Felix Zimmerle
- (Belgium) Benjamin Goffaux
- (Croatia) Antonio Horvatić
- (Czech Republic) Arnošt Dubový
- (Czech Republic) William Escala
- (Czech Republic) Matěj Menšík
- (France) Ernesto Martinez
- (Germany) David Grimes
- (Germany) Shawn Larry
- (Germany) Yannic Walther
- (Greece) Panagiotis Dudanakis
- (Greece) Ari Sechopoulos
- (Israel) Ryan Lavarnway
- (Israel) Robb Paller
- (Israel) Benjamin Rosengard
- (Italy) Federico Celli
- (Netherlands) Roger Bernadina
- (Netherlands) Ademar Rifaela
- (Spain) Andrés Angulo
- (Sweden) Leonard Bäckström
- (Sweden) Joel Johnson
- (Sweden) Tommy Lindell

== Notable participants ==
Several former and future Major League Baseball players participated in the tournament. Hall of Fame catcher Mike Piazza managed Italy and Robel García played for the Italian team. The Netherlands team included Didi Gregorius, Roger Bernadina, and Shairon Martis, with Gene Kingsale serving as a coach. Ryan Lavarnaway, Ty Kelly, Josh Zeid, and Jake Fishman played for Israel. Engel Beltré and Rhiner Cruz played for Spain. Eric Sogard played for Czechia. Catching prospect Harry Ford starred for Great Britain, which also included Jake Esch. Erik Pappas was a player and coach for Greece.
