= Baseball at the 2028 Summer Olympics – Qualification =

Six national teams will qualify to compete in baseball at the 2028 Summer Olympics in Los Angeles. As host, the United States automatically qualified.

Two teams from the Americas, the Dominican Republic and Venezuela, qualified through the 2026 World Baseball Classic in March 2026. Two additional teams will qualify through the 2027 WBSC Premier12, one from Asia and another from either Europe or Oceania. The final team will be determined at a standalone qualifying tournament in early 2028.

== Timeline ==
Event		Dates	Location(s)	Berth(s)	Qualified
Host nation		—N/a	—N/a	1	United States
2026 World Baseball Classic	Americas	March 5–17, 2026	(United States) Miami (Note: The World Baseball Classic was played in the United States, Puerto Rico, and Japan, with the final in Miami.)	2	Dominican Republic; Venezuela
2027 WBSC Premier12	Asia	November 8–21, 2027	(Japan) Tokyo	1	
2027 WBSC Premier12	Europe/Oceania	November 8–21, 2027	(Japan) Tokyo	1	
Final Qualifying Tournament		March 2028	TBD	1	
Total				6	

== World Baseball Classic ==
The sixth edition of the World Baseball Classic was played in Japan, Puerto Rico, and the United States from March 5 to 17, 2026. The top two highest ranked teams of the Americas in the tournament qualified for the 2028 Olympics. Both the Dominican Republic and Venezuela reached this threshold by advancing to the semifinals, with Venezuela ultimately winning their first WBC championship.

=== Final standings ===
Rk	Team	W	L	Tiebreaker
1st place, gold medalist(s)	Venezuela	6	1	–
2nd place, silver medalist(s)	United States	5	2	–
Lost in semifinals
3rd place, bronze medalist(s)	Dominican Republic	5	1	RA/Outs = 0.081
4	Italy	5	1	RA/Outs = 0.129
Lost in quarterfinals
5	Japan	4	1	–
6	Canada	3	2	Canada defeated Puerto Rico 3–2
7	Puerto Rico	3	2	Canada defeated Puerto Rico 3–2
8	South Korea	2	3	–
3rd place in pool
9	Australia	2	2	RA/Outs = 0.114
10	Cuba	2	2	RA/Outs = 0.152
11	Mexico	2	2	RA/Outs = 0.167
12	Israel	2	2	RA/Outs = 0.219
4th place in pool
13	Chinese Taipei	2	2	–
14	Colombia	1	3	RA/Outs = 0.225
15	Great Britain	1	3	RA/Outs = 0.245
16	Netherlands	1	3	RA/Outs = 0.276
5th place in pool
17	Panama	1	3	–
18	Nicaragua	0	4	RA/Outs = 0.248
19	Czech Republic	0	4	RA/Outs = 0.406
20	Brazil	0	4	RA/Outs = 0.511

== WBSC Premier12 ==
The fourth edition of the WBSC Premier12 will be played in November 2027. The top 12 teams on the WBSC World Rankings at the end of 2025 qualified for the tournament, with an additional four teams competing in a qualifying round in late 2026. Two teams will qualify for the Olympics through the Premier12, with one being the highest placed team from Asia and the other from either Europe or Oceania.

=== Eligible teams ===
Asia

- China
- Chinese Taipei
- Japan
- South Korea

Europe/Oceania

- Australia
- Czech Republic
- Great Britain
- Italy
- Netherlands
- Spain

== Final Qualifying Tournament ==
The WBSC Final Qualifier will be held no later than March 2028 to determine the final qualification berth. It is set to feature six teams in total, with the top two unqualified teams of the Asian Baseball Championship, two teams from the European Men's Baseball Championship, one from the Oceania Baseball Championship, and the winner of the Africa Cup Baseball Championship.
