= Evert-Jan 't Hoen =

Dutch baseball player and coach

- Manager
- Born: 8 November 1975 (age 50); Alphen aan den Rijn, Netherlands
- Bats: Right Throws: Right
- Stats at Baseball Reference
Medals
Men's baseball
Representing Netherlands
European Championship
| Gold medal – first place | 1995 Netherlands | National team |
| Gold medal – first place | 1999 Italy | National team |
| Gold medal – first place | 2003 Netherlands | National team |
| Gold medal – first place | 2005 Czech Republic | National team |
Manager for Netherlands
European Championship
| Gold medal – first place | 2019 Bonn | National team |
| Gold medal – first place | 2021 Turin | National team |
| Gold medal – first place | 2025 Rotterdam | National team |
| Bronze medal – third place | 2023 Czech Republic | National team |

Evert-Jan Axel Charles 't Hoen (born 8 November 1975 in Alphen aan den Rijn) is a Dutch baseball coach and former player who is the current manager of the Netherlands national baseball team. He was an infielder who played in Minor League Baseball from 1996 to 2001 and for the Dutch national team in three Summer Olympics.

== Playing career ==
=== Amateur career ===
't Hoen began playing baseball after his mother took him to a tee-ball game. He preferred baseball to soccer. After a recommendation from Dutch national team coach Jim Stoeckel, 't Hoen played college baseball at Indian River Community College in 1994 and 1995.

=== Minor League Baseball ===
The California Angels drafted 't Hoen in the 32th round of the 1995 MLB draft, and he played in the team's minor league system, primarily at shortstop, from 1996 to 2001. He made his professional debut with the Boise Hawks in 1996, then played for the Single-A Cedar Rapids Kernels in 1997 and 1998. In 1999 and 2000, he split the season between the Double-A Erie SeaWolves and Triple-A Edmonton Trappers. In 1999, he was selected to play in the All-Star Futures Game. In 2001, he again played at the Double-A and Triple-A levels but with different Angels affiliates, the Salt Lake Bees and the Arkansas Travelers.

=== Honkbal Hoofdklasse ===
't Hoen played for Twins Oosterhout in the Honkbal Hoofdklasse, the top Dutch baseball league, from 1994 to 1996. After ending his American career, 't Hoen played for Neptunus in the Hoofdklasse until his playing career ended due to injury in 2007.

== International baseball ==
't Hoen played for the Netherlands at the 1996 Summer Olympics in Atlanta, in which the Dutch finished sixth. He batted 5-for-23 and played shortstop in seven games. He also participated in the 2000 Summer Olympics in Sydney, where the Netherlands finished fifth. He hit .091 in five games, playing three infield positions. He also played in the 2004 Summer Olympics in Athens, where the Dutch finished sixth. He batted 1-for-6 with a home run, playing in parts of four games.

't Hoen also played in three Baseball World Cups and won four European Championships (1995, 1999, 2003, and 2005) with the Netherlands. He hit a three-RBI double in the finale of the 2005 European championship, a win over Italy.

== Coaching career ==
't Hoen managed Neptunus of the Honkbal Hoofdklasse from 2013 to 2016. Neptunus won the Holland Series in all four years he managed the team and won the 2015 European Champions Cup. In 2013, he was named the Coach of the Year by the European Baseball Coaches Association and at the Sport Awards Rotterdam-Rijnmond, the latter given to coaches in several sports in the Rotterdam area. He won the Rotterdam-Rijnmond award the following year.

In April 2018, 't Hoen was appointed manager of the Netherlands national team. In 2021, he was part of Hensley Meulens's staff as bench coach for the Netherlands in the 2020 Olympic Baseball Qualifier, where the Dutch failed to qualify to the Olympics. 't Hoen was also on Meulens' staff for the 2023 World Baseball Classic (WBC), serving as a quality control coach. 't Hoen managed the Netherlands in the 2023 European Championship, where the team finished third. He managed the team in the 2025 European Championship, which the Dutch won in Rotterdam. 't Hoen did not manage the team at the 2026 WBC, serving as the bench coach to Andruw Jones.

't Hoen was the infield coach for the European team in the 2024 Global Baseball Games, a series of two exhibition games held in Japan.
