= Johnny Balentina =

Curaçaoan baseball player (born 1971)

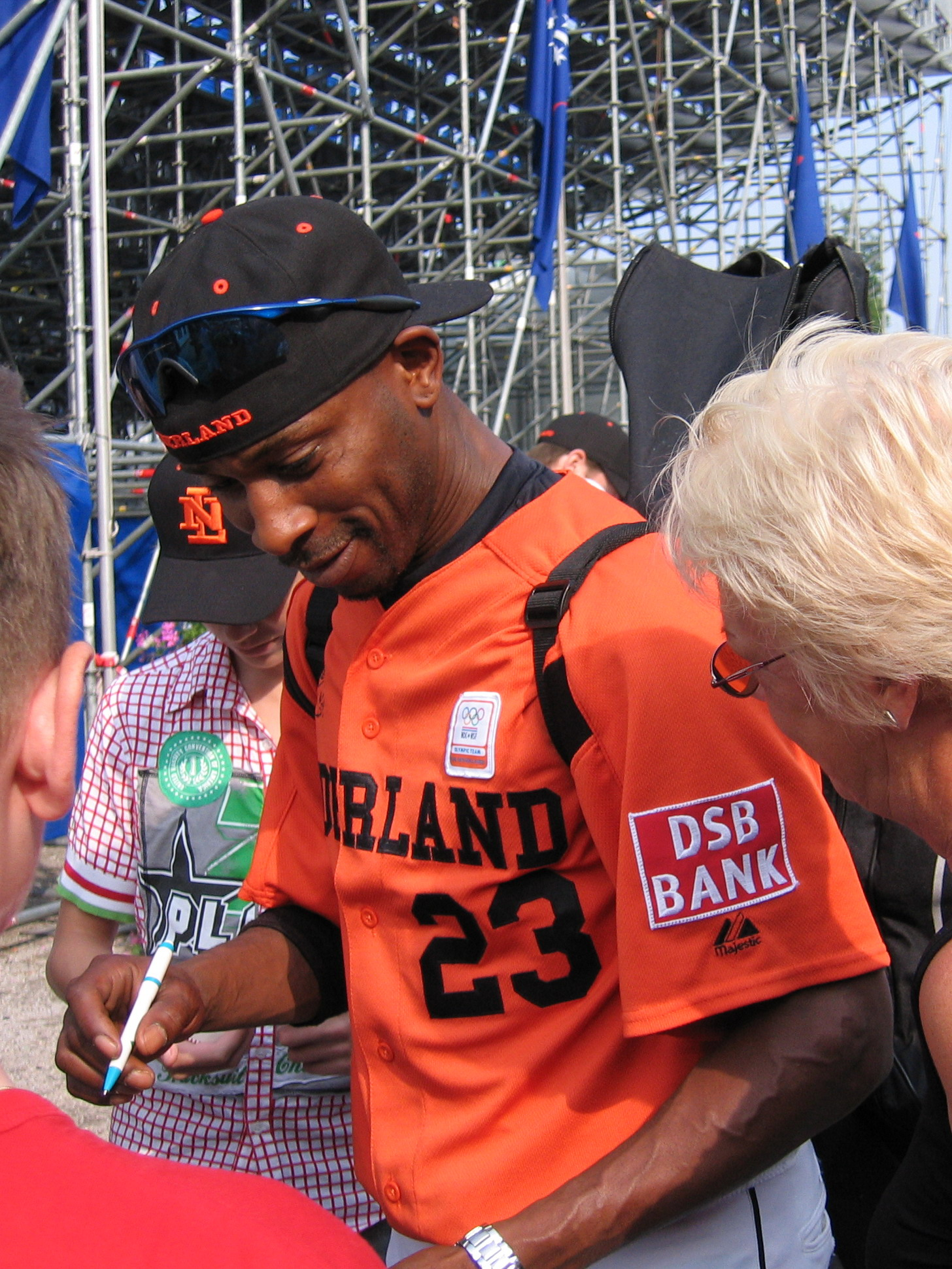
- Balentina in 2005
- Catcher
- Born: August 8, 1971 (age 55); Willemstad, Curaçao
- Bats: Right Throws: Right
- Stats at Baseball Reference
Medals
Men's baseball
Representing Netherlands
European Baseball Championship
Gold medal – first place	1993 Sweden	National team
Gold medal – first place	1995 Netherlands	National team
Silver medal – second place	1997 France	National team
Gold medal – first place	1999 Italy	National team
Gold medal – first place	2001 Germany	National team
Gold medal – first place	2007 Spain	National team

Randolph Benito "Johnny" Balentina (born August 8, 1971) is a Curaçaoan former baseball player. He was a catcher in three consecutive Summer Olympics for the Netherlands, starting in 1996 in Atlanta. Twice, the Dutch team finished in sixth place (1996 and 2004) and once in fifth place (2000).

Balentina won the Dutch baseball federation's Guus van der Heijden Memorial Trophy, given to the country's best under-23 player, in 1992. He was the most valuable player at the 1995 and 1997 European Baseball Championships. He was also the MVP of the 2004 Haarlem Baseball Week tournament. He appeared in more than 100 games for the Dutch team, including in the 2006 World Baseball Classic.

Balentina played in the Honkbal Hoofklasse, the top Dutch league, primarily for Neptunus. He also played for Sparta, ADO (where he was a player–manager for two seasons), and Kinheim. He also played for Royal Scorpions in Curaçao's league in 2008 and Cariparma Parma in the Italian Baseball League in 2009. After retiring as a player, he returned to Curaçao and coached Wildcats KJ74 in the domestic league.
