= 1997 European Baseball Championship =

Tournament details
- Country: France
- City: Paris
- Dates: 29 August – 7 September 1997
- Teams: 12
- Defending champions: Netherlands

Final positions
- Champions: Italy
- Runners-up: Netherlands
- Third place: Spain
- Fourth place: Russia

Awards
- MVP: (Netherlands) Johnny Balentina

The 1997 European Baseball Championship was won by Italy. It was held in Paris, France. In a battle of undefeated teams, Italy defeated the defending champion, the Netherlands, 4–2 in the finale. It was the last European championship to feature aluminum bats. The field expanded from 10 teams at the 1995 championship to 12 teams and featured one first-time participant, the Czech Republic.

Dutch catcher Johnny Balentina won his second consecutive tournament MVP award. The Netherlands subsequently won every European championship until 2010, when the Italy again snapped the Dutch's title run.

The French Federation of Baseball and Softball faced financial problems after hosting the tournament, with the Confederation of European Baseball temporarily suspending French teams from competitions, though France returned for the 1999 championship.

== Standings ==
Pos.	Team	Record
1	Italy	8–0
2	Netherlands	7–1
3	Spain	5–3
4	Russia	4–4
5	France	6–3
6	Belgium	4–4
7	Czech Republic	4–4
8	Sweden	2–6
9	Great Britain	2–5
10	Germany	3–4
11	Ukraine	2–5
12	Slovenia	0–7

== Awards ==
- Most valuable player: (Netherlands) Johnny Balentina
- Best batter: (Belgium) Tonny Verhaert
- Best pitcher: (Belgium) Michael Leys
