= Francisco Cervelli =

Venezuelan baseball player (born 1986)

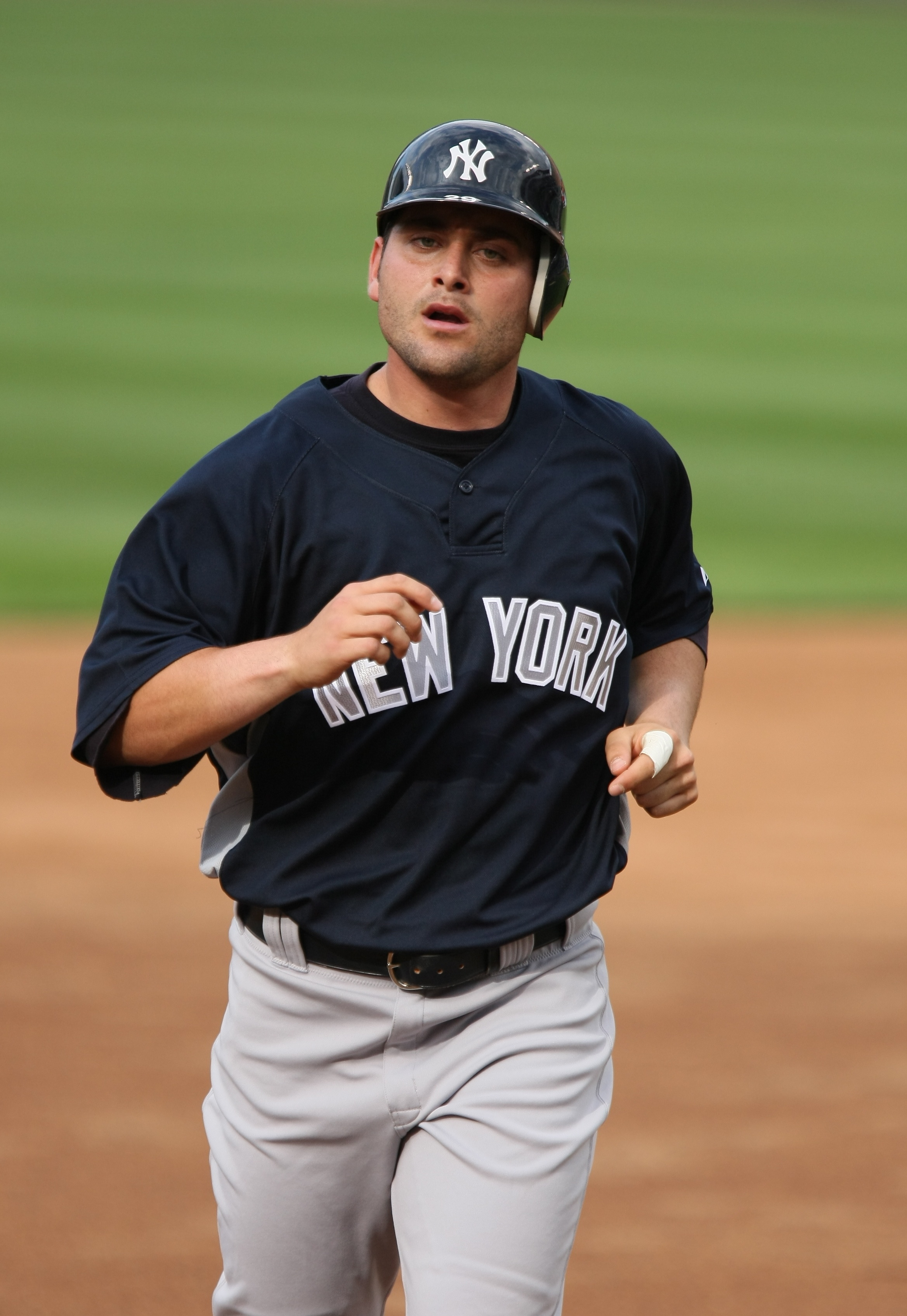
- Cervelli with the New York Yankees
- Catcher
- Born: March 6, 1986 (age 40); Valencia, Venezuela
- Batted: Right Threw: Right

MLB debut
- September 18, 2008, for the New York Yankees

Last MLB appearance
- August 22, 2020, for the Miami Marlins

MLB statistics
- Batting average: .268
- Home runs: 41
- Runs batted in: 275
- Stats at Baseball Reference

Teams
- New York Yankees (2008–2014); Pittsburgh Pirates (2015–2019); Atlanta Braves (2019); Miami Marlins (2020)
Medals
Men's baseball
Manager for Italy
European Championship
Silver medal – second place	2025 Rotterdam	Team

Francisco Cervelli (born March 6, 1986) is an Italian-Venezuelan former professional baseball catcher and current manager of the Águilas Cibaeñas of the Dominican Professional Baseball League (LIDOM). He played in Major League Baseball (MLB) from 2008 to 2020 for the New York Yankees, Pittsburgh Pirates, Atlanta Braves, and Miami Marlins.

The Yankees signed Cervelli as an international free agent in 2003. He made his MLB debut with the Yankees in 2008, and played on the 2009 World Series championship team that beat the Philadelphia Phillies. He also played in the 2009 and 2017 World Baseball Classics for the Italian national team. He was acquired by the Pirates in November 2014. The Pirates traded Cervelli to Atlanta in 2019, and he played for Miami in 2020 before announcing his retirement. After retiring, he was hired as catching coach for the San Diego Padres' 2022 season.

During his playing career, Cervelli represented the Italy national baseball team in international competition. He was named manager of the national team in 2025, leading it to an historic semifinal berth at the 2026 World Baseball Classic and qualifying for the 2027 WBSC Premier12.

== Early life ==
Francisco Cervelli was born in Valencia, Venezuela, to an Italian immigrant father, Emanuele Cervelli, and a Venezuelan mother, Damelis. He also has a sister.

In Venezuela, Cervelli played shortstop, second base, and sometimes pitched. The Yankees signed him as an international free agent with the understanding that he would try catching.

=== Minor leagues ===
Cervelli played in the Dominican Summer League in 2003. Initially a switch hitter, the Yankees had Cervelli focus on right-handed hitting.

After struggling to adjust to professional baseball in 2004 and 2005, Cervelli batted .309 for the Staten Island Yankees of the Class A-Short Season New York–Penn League in 2006. In 2007, he played for the Tampa Yankees of the Class A-Advanced Florida State League, where he batted .279 with an on-base percentage of .387 and two home runs. Baseball America rated him the Yankees' 23rd-best prospect prior for the 2008 season.

On March 8, 2008, Cervelli fractured his wrist on a controversial play during a spring training game against the Tampa Bay Rays, when Rays infielder Elliot Johnson collided with him at home plate in the ninth inning. Joe Girardi, the Yankees manager said, "I think it was uncalled for, it's spring training and you are going to get people hurt and we got Cervelli hurt." He did not return to action until June.

Cervelli began the 2009 season with the Trenton Thunder of the Class AA Eastern League.

== Major league career ==
=== New York Yankees ===
Following the completion of the 2008 minor league season, Cervelli was called up to the Yankees. He made his major league debut on September 18, 2008, as a defensive replacement. He batted 0-for-5 in his brief time in the majors.

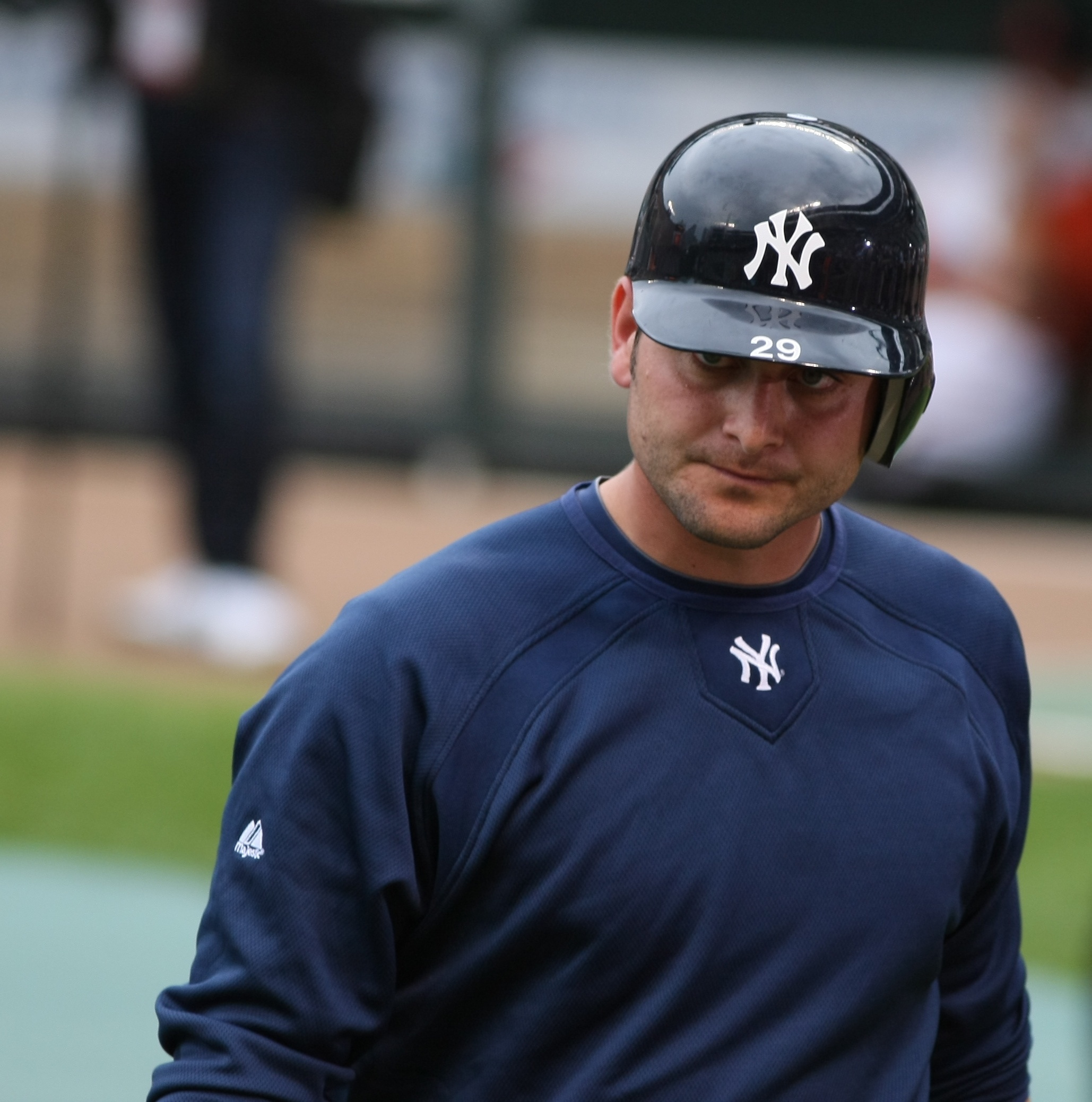
Cervelli with the Yankees

After starting the 2009 season in the minors, Cervelli was called up by the Yankees on May 5, 2009, when Jorge Posada was placed on the 15-day disabled list, though he was batting only .190, with a .266 on-base percentage and .310 slugging percentage at Trenton at the time of the call-up, and had not played in Class AAA. He made his first appearance of the season on May 7, after José Molina injured his quad. He recorded his first major league hit, a single, on May 8, against the Baltimore Orioles, while also catching starting pitcher CC Sabathia during a complete game shutout. Cervelli asserted himself as a reliable defensive catcher for the New York Yankees, and received praise from his teammates. Though Cervelli was sent to the Scranton/Wilkes-Barre Yankees of the Class AAA International League on July 8, 2009, when Molina was activated off of the disabled list, Yankees' manager Joe Girardi made clear that he was impressed with Cervelli's performance.

On June 24, 2009, Cervelli hit his first major league home run against Kris Medlen of the Atlanta Braves, breaking up a no-hitter. On September 16, Cervelli had his first walk-off hit – a single in the bottom of the ninth inning against the Toronto Blue Jays. Cervelli was a member of the Yankees roster in the 2009 MLB postseason, as the Yankees won the 2009 World Series, but he was not on the World Series roster.

Cervelli started the 2010 season on the Yankees' 25-man roster to serve as the backup catcher to Posada, and served as the Yankees' starting catcher while Posada recovered from a foot injury. On March 6, Cervelli was hit in the head by a pitch. He was removed from the game with a concussion. Shortly after, citing another concussion Cervelli suffered while playing winter ball, the Yankees suggested he begin wearing the Rawlings S-100 protective helmet, a bulkier model made to withstand 100 mph fastballs. This briefly earned him the nickname "Gazoo", a reference to a character in The Flintstones.

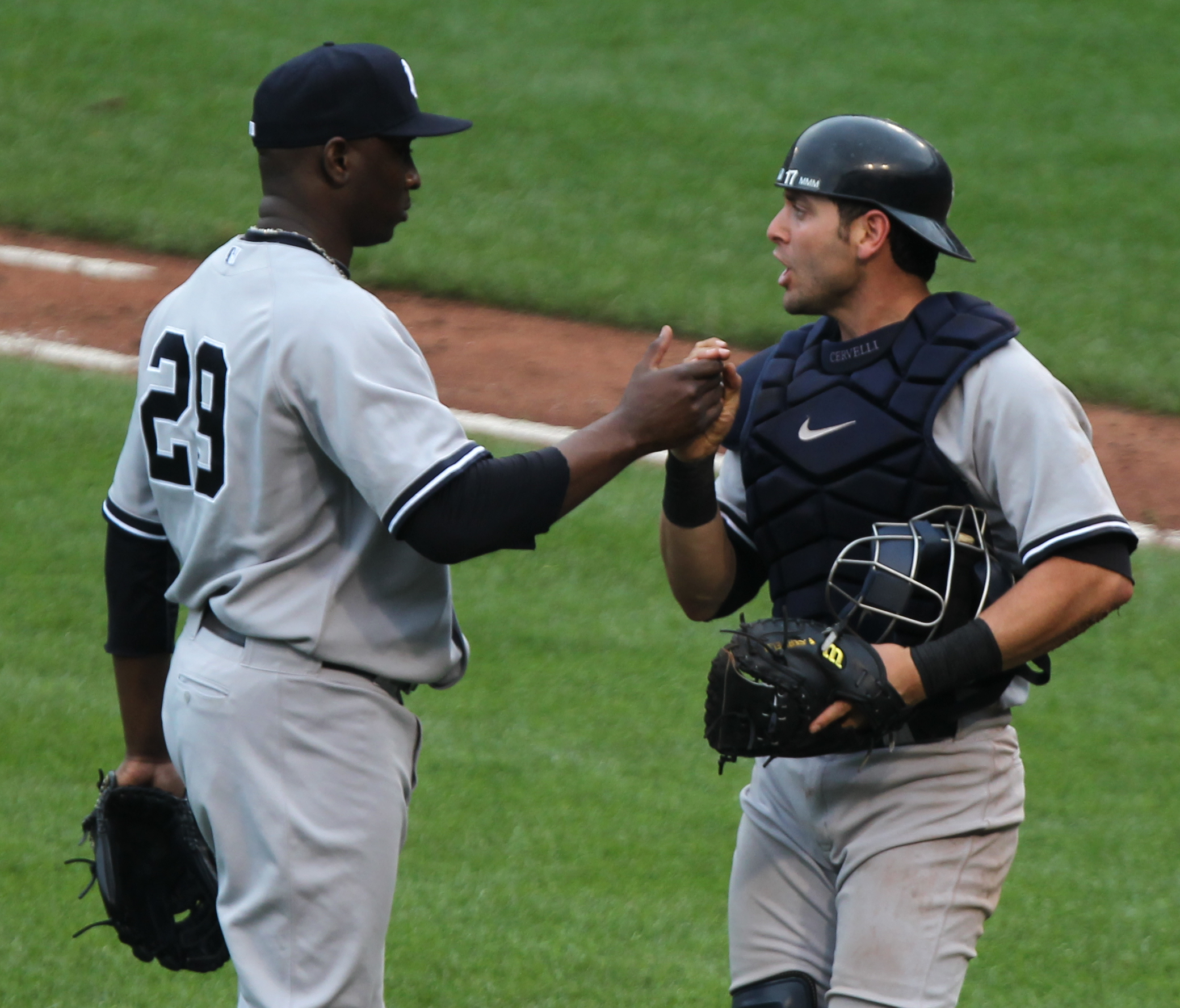
Cervelli (right) with Rafael Soriano

In 2011, Cervelli entered spring training as the backup to Russell Martin. Cervelli broke his foot in early March, and missed the beginning of the 2011 season. On April 29, 2011, the New York Yankees activated Cervelli from the disabled list, and on May 8, he hit his first home run of the season, also the first grand slam of his career, in a series tiebreaker on the road against Texas.

Cervelli was optioned to Scranton/Wilkes-Barre to begin the 2012 season, with Chris Stewart winning the job as Martin's backup. Cervelli admitted that he moped following the demotion, until his parents visited him during the season and refocused him on improving his game. The Yankees recalled Cervelli to the majors when rosters expanded on September 1.

When Martin signed with the Pittsburgh Pirates, Cervelli became the starting catcher for the Yankees in 2013. In a game against the Blue Jays on April 26, Cervelli suffered a fractured right hand after getting hit by a foul tip by outfielder Rajai Davis; he then underwent surgery the next day and was placed on the 60-day disabled list. On August 5, 2013, Cervelli was suspended for 50 games after being linked with the Biogenesis scandal.

Cervelli competed with John Ryan Murphy and Austin Romine to be the backup catcher for the Yankees in spring training in 2014. Cervelli won the job, but suffered a hamstring injury on April 13, and was placed on the 60-day disabled list. He returned to the Yankees on June 17. On September 6, Cervelli suffered from cluster migraines. Though they were determined to not be the result of his prior concussions, he missed time while he recuperated. Cervelli finished the 2014 season with a .301 batting average in 49 games.

=== Pittsburgh Pirates ===
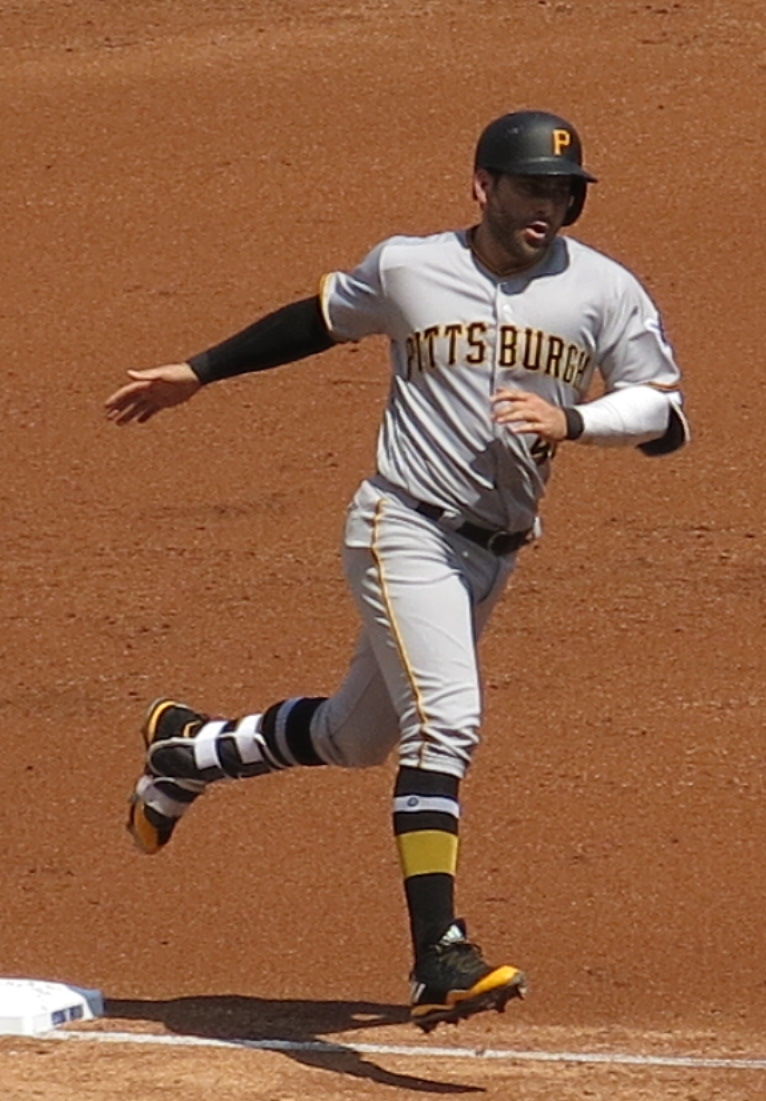
Cervelli with the Pirates in 2017

On November 12, 2014, the Yankees traded Cervelli to the Pirates in exchange for pitcher Justin Wilson. Cervelli started 124 games for the Pirates in 2015, in which he batted .295 and was worth 3.8 Wins Above Replacement. Runners stole a major-league-leading 101 bases against him.

Prior to the 2016 season, the Pirates signed Cervelli to a one-year contract worth $3.5 million. During the 2016 season, the Pirates signed Cervelli to a three-year contract extension, worth $31 million. In 2016, his batting dropped to .264/.377/.322 (his lowest slugging percentage of his career), as he hit only one home run in 393 plate appearances, and caught 19% of attempted basestealers.

In 2017, Cervelli batted .249 (the lowest batting average of his career)/.342/.370, as he caught 20% of attempted basestealers. On June 22, 2018, he was placed on the seven day disabled list with a concussion. He was activated a couple of weeks later but fell back to the seven day disabled list with a recurrence of the concussion symptom. In 2018 he batted .259/.378/.431 with a career-high 12 home runs.

Cervelli suffered his sixth concussion on May 25, 2019. While rehabilitating, he decided to give up catching. He later backtracked, saying he wanted to continue catching. With the Pirates in 2019, he batted .193/.279/.248 in 34 games.

=== Atlanta Braves ===
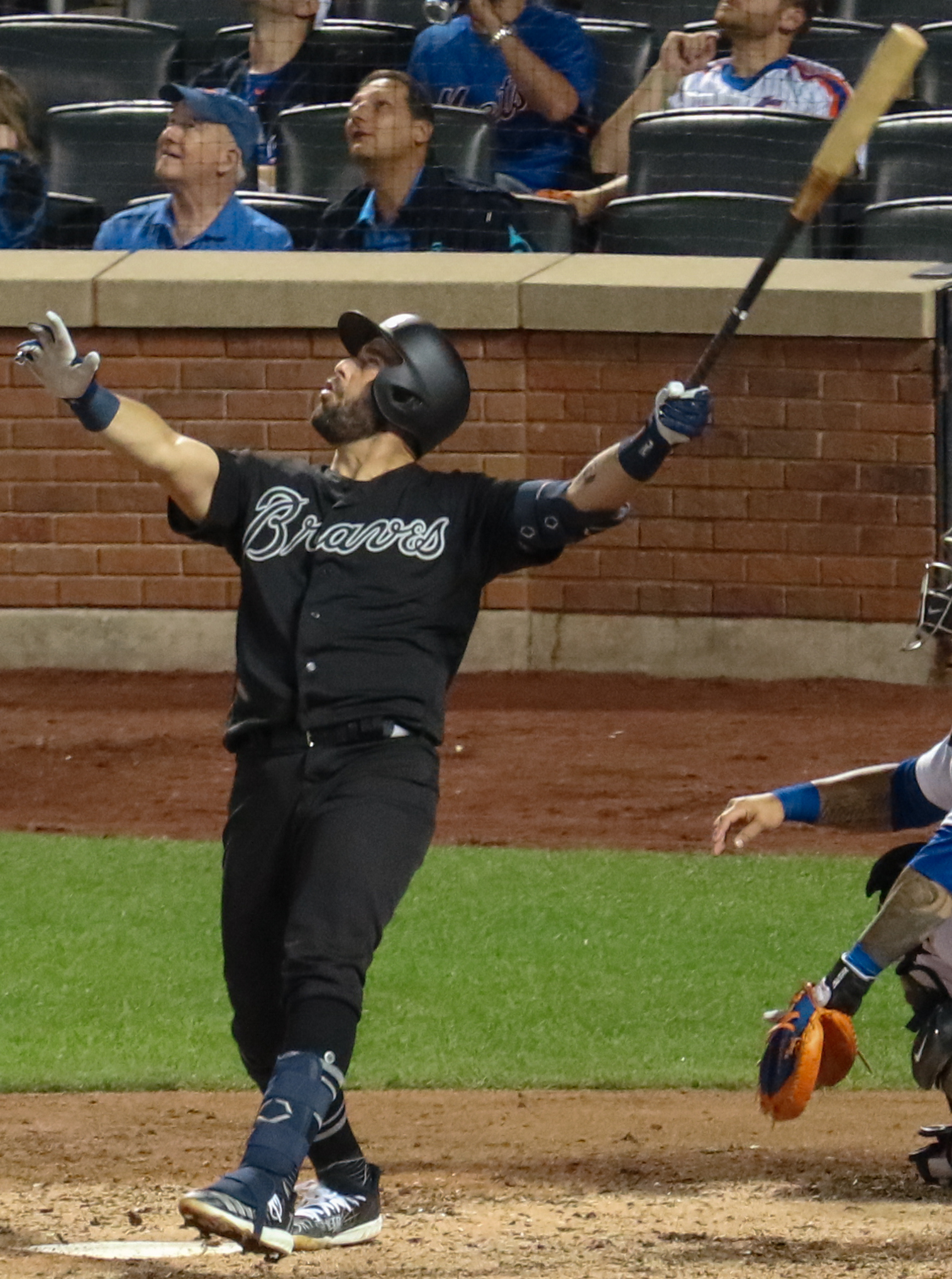
Cervelli with the Atlanta Braves in 2019

On August 22, 2019, the Pirates released Cervelli in order to give him the opportunity to receive playing time with another team. He signed with the Atlanta Braves on August 24. In his debut with the Braves, Cervelli went 4-for-5 with three doubles and three RBIs during the Braves 9-5 win over the Mets on August 24. He batted .281 with two home runs and seven RBIs in 14 games for the Braves before the end of the season.

The Braves included Cervelli on their roster for the 2019 National League Division Series. The Braves would go on to lose to the Cardinals in five games.

=== Miami Marlins ===
On January 9, 2020, Cervelli signed a one-year, $2 million contract with the Miami Marlins, to serve as a backup catcher to Jorge Alfaro. Alfaro began the season on the injured list, and Cervelli started for the Marlins on Opening Day. On August 22, 2020, Cervelli was placed on the injured list and later ruled out for the season after his seventh MLB concussion. He played in 16 games total in 2020, and announced his retirement after the regular season.

== International career ==
Despite being Venezuelan, Cervelli was eligible for the Italy national baseball team due to his Italian father. He played for Italy in the 2009 and the 2017 World Baseball Classic.

== Coaching career ==
On December 1, 2021, Cervelli was hired by the San Diego Padres to serve as the team's catching instructor for the 2022 season.

On January 24, 2025, Cervelli was named manager of the Italian national team, replacing Mike Piazza.

At the 2026 World Baseball Classic, Italy posted a 5-1 record, won Pool B, and defeated the United States en route to a semifinal appearance. Italy ultimately finished fourth, marking the country's deepest run in tournament history.

== Personal life ==
Cervelli is an avid soccer fan, and a supporter of Serie A football club Juventus.

During the crisis in Venezuela, Cervelli's parents moved to Colombia, and his grandparents returned to Italy. Cervelli took to social media in 2017 to voice his opposition to Nicolás Maduro. He teamed with Hernán Pérez in an ongoing effort to call American attention to the issue, using techniques such as writing "SOS Venezuela" on his eye black. He led teammates in wearing "Freedom for Venezuela" t-shirts in 2019.

== See also ==
- List of Major League Baseball players from Venezuela
- List of Major League Baseball players suspended for performance-enhancing drugs
