= Eddie Dix =

Dutch baseball player and manager (born 1970)

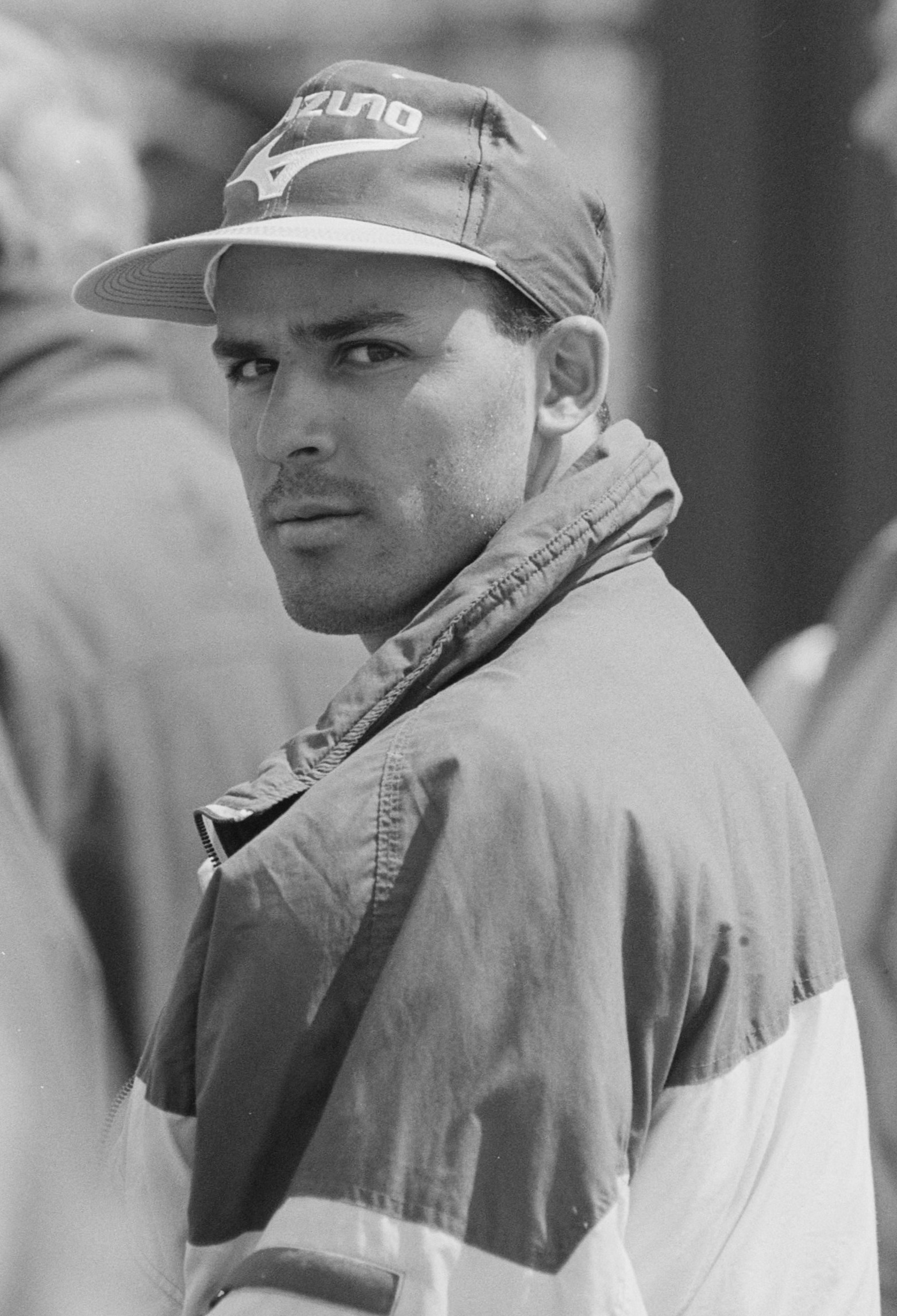
- Dix in 1995
- Middle infielder
- Born: December 31, 1970 (age 55); Schiedam, Netherlands
Medals
Men's baseball
Representing Netherlands
European Championship
Gold medal – first place	1993 Stockholm	Team
Gold medal – first place	1995 Haarlem	Team
Gold medal – first place	1999 Italy	Team

Eduard Richard Dix (born 31 December 1970) is a Dutch former baseball player and manager who played for the Netherlands national team at the 1996 Summer Olympics. He batted 2-for-15 in the Olympics while playing second base.

With the Dutch team, he won the European Baseball Championship in 1993, 1995, and 1999. He led the 1993 tournament with eight stolen bases while batting .345 in nineine games. He debuted with the Dutch team at the 1993 World Port Tournament.

Dix also played in the Honkbal Hoofdklasse for Neptunus, hitting a home run in the 1999 Holland Series. He retired after the 2001 season.

Dix managed the Netherlands women's national team at the Women's Baseball World Cup in 2014 and 2016, replacing fellow men's national team player Percy Isenia as manager. He was succeeded as manager by Elvin Englentina in 2018. Dix also coached the boys' national under-18 team at the 2006 U-18 Baseball World Cup and 2007 European Junior Championship.
