= Edsel Martis =

Dutch baseball player (born 1961)

- Born: December 22, 1961 (age 64); Willemstad, Curaçao
- Bats: Left Throws: Left
Medals
Men's baseball
Representing Netherlands
European Baseball Championship
Gold medal – first place	1993 Sweden	National team
Gold medal – first place	1995 Netherlands	National team

Edsel Judas Martis (born December 22, 1961, in Willemstad, Curaçao) is a Dutch baseball player who played on the Netherlands national team at the 1996 Summer Olympics and other international tournaments. He won the 1993 and 1995 European championships with the Netherlands, leading the 1995 tournament in runs batted in. He was named the best designated hitter of that tournament. Martis played in the Honkbal Hoofdklasse from 1982 to 1997 and 2006 to 2007 for several teams.

Martis played in four games in the 1996 Olympics, all losses for the Netherlands. He batted 2-for-3 against Japan then 1-for-2 against Cuba, both mercy rule losses. He then was 0-for-5 facing South Korea and 1-for-2 against the United States.

In the Hoofdklasse, Martis played for Amsterdam Pirates, Pioniers, HCAW, Almere Giants, and Haarlem Nicols. He won the Holland Series with Amsterdam in 1987. In 1988, he hit .339 with Almere.

He was known for his ability to hit for power and contact from the left side and his athletic ability and speed. In the Hoofdklasse, he led the league in batting average, home runs, runs batted in, and stolen bases.

Martis is married and has two sons. He owns a transportation company in the Netherlands.
