= 2024 Haarlem Baseball Week =

Tournament details
- Country: Netherlands
- City: Haarlem
- Dates: 12–19 July 2024
- Teams: 6
- Defending champions: Netherlands

Final positions
- Champions: Japan (5th title)
- Runners-up: United States
- Third place: Netherlands
- Fourth place: Chinese Taipei

Tournament statistics
- Games played: 20
- Attendance: 62,300 (3,115 per game)

Awards
- MVP: (Japan) Taiga Kojima

The 2024 Haarlem Baseball Week was a international baseball competition held at the Pim Mulier Stadium in Haarlem, the Netherlands from 12 to 19 July 2024. It was the 31st edition of the tournament. Japan won its fifth tournament, defeating the United States in the championship game.

== Teams ==
A usual number of six teams were invited to the tournament.

| Chinese Taipei^{1} | 11th appearance |
| Italy | 7th appearance |
| Japan | 17th appearance |
| Netherlands | Host nation |
| Spain | 1st appearance |
| United States | 10th appearance |

^1 Chinese Taipei is the official IBAF designation for the team representing Taiwan.

Japan sent members of its university team to the tournament. The U.S. team was made up of players from the NJCAA, the second tier of college baseball in the country. Chinese Taipei also fielded a team of young players, none over the age of 22. The Dutch team included players from the Honkbal Hoofdklasse and other European professional baseball leagues, including Roger Bernadina and Shairon Martis. Italy's team included players from the Italian Baseball League and prospects hoping to qualify for the 2028 Olympics. Spain made its first appearance in the tournament and, like the other European teams, its roster featured professional players, including Engel Beltré and Rhiner Cruz.

== Opening round ==
=== Standings ===
| Teams | W | L | Pct. | GB |
|---|---|---|---|---|
| Japan | 5 | 0 | 1.000 | — |
| Netherlands | 4 | 1 | .800 | 1 |
| United States | 3 | 2 | .600 | 2 |
| Chinese Taipei | 2 | 3 | .400 | 3 |
| Italy | 1 | 4 | .200 | 4 |
| Spain | 0 | 5 | .000 | 5 |

== Final round ==
| 18 July 2024 - 5th/6th place | Italy | 4 – 13 | Spain | Pim Mulier Stadium, Haarlem; Attendance: 1,800 |
| 18 July 2024 - 5th/6th place | | Boxscore | | Pim Mulier Stadium, Haarlem; Attendance: 1,800 |

| 18 July 2024 - Semi Final A | Netherlands | 1 – 2 (F/10) | United States | Pim Mulier Stadium, Haarlem; Attendance: 4,100 |
| 18 July 2024 - Semi Final A | | Boxscore | | Pim Mulier Stadium, Haarlem; Attendance: 4,100 |

| 18 July 2024 - Semi Final B | Japan | 8 – 0 | Chinese Taipei | Pim Mulier Stadium, Haarlem; Attendance: 3,100 |
| 18 July 2024 - Semi Final B | | Boxscore | | Pim Mulier Stadium, Haarlem; Attendance: 3,100 |

| 19 July 2024 - Bronze Medal Game | Netherlands | 4 – 0 | Chinese Taipei | Pim Mulier Stadium, Haarlem; Attendance: 3,900 |
| 19 July 2024 - Bronze Medal Game | | Boxscore | | Pim Mulier Stadium, Haarlem; Attendance: 3,900 |

| 19 July 2024 - Championship Game | Japan | 10 – 4 | United States | Pim Mulier Stadium, Haarlem |
| 19 July 2024 - Championship Game | | Boxscore | | Pim Mulier Stadium, Haarlem |

== Final standings ==
| Rk | Team |
|---|---|
| 1 | Japan |
| 2 | United States |
| 3 | Netherlands |
| 4 | Chinese Taipei |
| 5 | Spain |
| 6 | Italy |

2024 Haarlem Baseball Week champions

Japan
5th title

== Awards ==
- Most valuable player: (Japan) Taiga Kojima
- Best hitter: (United States) Robby Bolin
- Best pitcher: (Chinese Taipei) Yu-Ting Lu
- Most popular player: (Netherlands) Sem Kuijper
