= 2027 WBSC Premier12 qualification =

International baseball qualifying tournament

WBSC Premier12 2027 Qualifier
Tournament details
- Countries: China; Spain
- Dates: October 9 – November 28, 2026
- Teams: 8 (from 3 confederations)

The qualifying round of the 2027 WBSC Premier12, officially called the WBSC Premier12 2027 Qualifier, will be held in late 2026. The top twelve national baseball teams ranked by the World Baseball Softball Confederation automatically qualified for the tournament, with the qualifiers being held to determine the remaining four teams. Two tournaments of four teams each will be held, with the first being held in October 2026 in Barcelona, Spain, and second taking place in November 2026 in Zhongshan, China.

With the expansion of the WBSC Premier12 from 12 teams to 16 beginning in 2027, these will be the first qualifying tournaments held for the competition.

== Qualified teams ==
Team	World Ranking	Method of qualification	Date of qualification	Premier12 appearance	Previous best performance
Australia	11	WBSC World Rankings	December 31, 2025	3rd	Super Round (2019)
Chinese Taipei	2	WBSC World Rankings	December 31, 2025	4th	Champions (2024)
Cuba	10	WBSC World Rankings	December 31, 2025	4th	Quarterfinals (2015)
Dominican Republic	12	WBSC World Rankings	December 31, 2025	4th	Group stage (2015, 2019, 2024)
Japan	1	WBSC World Rankings	December 31, 2025	4th	Champions (2019)
Mexico	6	WBSC World Rankings	December 31, 2025	4th	Third place (2019)
Netherlands	9	WBSC World Rankings	December 31, 2025	4th	Quarterfinals (2015)
Panama	8	WBSC World Rankings	December 31, 2025	2nd	Group stage (2024)
Puerto Rico	7	WBSC World Rankings	December 31, 2025	4th	Quarterfinals (2015)
South Korea	4	WBSC World Rankings	December 31, 2025	4th	Champions (2015)
United States	3	WBSC World Rankings	December 31, 2025	4th	Runners-up (2015)
Venezuela	5	WBSC World Rankings	December 31, 2025	4th	Fourth place (2024)
Spain	26	Pool A winners	October 10, 2026	1st	Debut
Italy	14	Pool A runners-up	October 11, 2026	2nd	Group stage (2015)

== Venues ==
Qualifier 1	2027 WBSC Premier12 qualification is located in Spain	2027 WBSC Premier12 qualification is located in China	Qualifier 2
Barcelona, Spain	2027 WBSC Premier12 qualification is located in Spain	2027 WBSC Premier12 qualification is located in China	Zhongshan, China
Carlos Pérez de Rozas Stadium	2027 WBSC Premier12 qualification is located in Spain	2027 WBSC Premier12 qualification is located in China	International Baseball and Softball Centre
Capacity: 4,000	2027 WBSC Premier12 qualification is located in Spain	2027 WBSC Premier12 qualification is located in China	Capacity: 5,000

== Format ==
Note: Numbers in parentheses indicate positions in the latest WBSC World Rankings (December 31, 2025) at the time of the announcement of the qualifiers.

Pool A	Pool B
Spain (26) (hosts)	China (17) (hosts)
Colombia (13)	Czechia (15)
Italy (14)	Nicaragua (16)
Germany (18)	Great Britain (19)

The format of the qualifying round was announced in October 2024. Six teams ranked 13th to 18th in the WBSC World Rankings as of December 31, 2025, qualified for the initial tournament, with two wild cards also joining. Two groups of four teams will play in a round-robin format for three game days, with the top two teams in each group advancing to the Premier12.

In January 2026, seven of the eight teams participating in the tournament were announced by the WBSC based on the most recent World Rankings: Colombia, Italy, Czechia, Nicaragua, China, Germany, and Great Britain. In March, Spain was confirmed to be the eighth participant as the host of the first qualifying tournament.

== Pool A ==
Pool A took place at the Estadio Pérez de Rozas, a baseball field located at Anella Olímpica in Barcelona, Spain, from October 9 to 11, 2026. The match schedule was announced on July 7, 2026.

Pos	Team	Pld	W	L	RF	RA	PCT	GB	Qualification
1	Spain (H)	3	2	1	11	12	.667 (Note: Spain defeated Italy, 5–2)	—	Final tournament
2	Italy	3	2	1	11	8	.667	—	Final tournament
3	Germany	3	1	2	8	9	.333 (Note: Germany defeated Colombia, 6–1)	1	
4	Colombia	3	1	2	12	13	.333	1	

Source: WBSC
(H) Hosts

=== Summary ===
Date	Local time	Road team	Score	Home team	Inn.	Venue	Game duration	Attendance	Boxscore
Oct 9, 2026	12:00 CEST	Colombia	3–4	Italy		Estadio Pérez de Rozas	2:57	272	Boxscore
Oct 9, 2026	19:00 CEST	Germany	2–3	Spain	10	Estadio Pérez de Rozas	2:47	447	Boxscore
Oct 10, 2026	12:00 CEST	Germany	6–1	Colombia		Estadio Pérez de Rozas	2:46	184	Boxscore
Oct 10, 2026	19:00 CEST	Spain	5–2	Italy		Estadio Pérez de Rozas	3:42	824	Boxscore
Oct 11, 2026	12:00 CEST	Italy	5–0	Germany		Estadio Pérez de Rozas	3:11	173	Boxscore
Oct 11, 2026	19:00 CEST	Spain	3–8	Colombia		Estadio Pérez de Rozas	3:01	642	Boxscore

== Pool B ==
Pool B will take place at the International Baseball and Softball Centre in Zhongshan, China, from November 26 to 28, 2026. The match schedule was announced on July 13, 2026.

Pos	Team	Pld	W	L	RF	RA	PCT	GB	Qualification
1	China (H)	0	0	0	0	0	—	—	Final tournament
2	Czechia	0	0	0	0	0	—	—	Final tournament
3	Nicaragua	0	0	0	0	0	—	—	
4	Great Britain	0	0	0	0	0	—	—	

First games will be played: November 26, 2026. Source: WBSC
(H) Hosts

=== Summary ===
Date	Local time	Road team	Score	Home team	Inn.	Venue	Game duration	Attendance	Boxscore
Nov 26, 2026	12:00 CST	Nicaragua	–	Great Britain		Panda Heritage Stadium			
Nov 26, 2026	18:30 CST	Czech Republic	–	China		Panda Heritage Stadium			
Nov 27, 2026	12:00 CST	Czech Republic	–	Nicaragua		Panda Heritage Stadium			
Nov 27, 2026	18:30 CST	China	–	Great Britain		Panda Heritage Stadium			
Nov 28, 2026	12:00 CST	Great Britain	–	Czech Republic		Panda Heritage Stadium			
Nov 28, 2026	18:30 CST	China	–	Nicaragua		Panda Heritage Stadium			

== Statistical leaders ==
=== Batting ===
Statistic	Name	Total/Avg
Batting average*	(Spain) Frank Hernández (Germany) Luca Hörger	.500
Hits	(Spain) Frank Hernández	7
Runs	(Spain) Luis Guillorme	3
Doubles	(Colombia) Carlos Arroyo	3
Triples	(Germany) Luca Hörger	1
Home runs	4 tied with	1
Runs batted in	(Germany) William Germaine	5
Strikeouts	(Spain) Edison Valerio	6
Stolen bases	(Colombia) Jesús Marriaga	2
On-base percentage*	(Spain) Frank Hernández	.563
Slugging percentage*	(Germany) Luca Hörger	.750
OPS*	(Germany) Luca Hörger	1.306

* Minimum 2.7 plate appearances per team game

=== Pitching ===
Statistic	Name	Total/Avg
Wins	6 tied with	1
Losses	6 tied with	1
Saves	(Italy) Claudio Scotti	1
Innings pitched	(Germany) Christian Pedrol	9.0
Hits allowed	(Germany) Markus Solbach	9
Runs allowed	(Spain) Ernesto Miguel	4
Earned runs allowed	(Spain) Pablo Guillén (Italy) Matteo Bocchi (Colombia) Jose Garces	3
Earned run average*	8 tied with	0.00
Walks	5 tied with	3
Strikeouts	(Germany) Christian Pedrol	10
WHIP*	(Germany) Christian Pedrol	0.56

* Minimum 0.8 innings pitched per team game
