= Massimiliano Masin =

Italian baseball player

- Pitcher
- Born: 9 July 1968 (age 57); Rome, Italy
- Throws: Left
- Stats at Baseball Reference

Massimiliano Masin (born 9 July 1968) is a retired Italian professional baseball pitcher. He played for the Italian national baseball team in the 1992 Summer Olympics and the 1996 Summer Olympics. He played professionally for the Nettuno Baseball Club.
