= Global Baseball Games =

International club baseball tournament

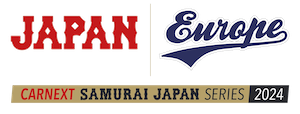
- Sport: Baseball
- Founded: 2015
- Organizing body: WBSC

The Global Baseball Games, billed as the Carnext Samurai Japan Series for sponsorship purposes, are an international exhibition baseball series played between Samurai Japan and a team of European All-Stars. The series is typically played in Japan in the same year as the WBSC Premier12 tournament.

The first edition of the series was played in 2015, then known as the Global Baseball Match, and was the debut of Team Europe in international competition. The next edition was played in 2024, at the Kyocera Dome in Osaka. In the second game, six Japanese pitchers combined to throw a perfect game.

== Games ==
=== 2015 ===
March 10, 2015	Europe (European Union)	3 – 4	Japan	Tokyo Dome, Tokyo
March 10, 2015	LP: Loek van Mil	Boxscore	WP: Katsuki Matayoshi; Sv: Yuji Nishino	Tokyo Dome, Tokyo

March 10, 2015	Japan	2 – 6	(European Union) Europe	Tokyo Dome, Tokyo
March 10, 2015	LP: Takahiro Matsuba	Boxscore	WP: Luke Sommer	Tokyo Dome, Tokyo
March 10, 2015		Boxscore	HR: Yurendell DeCaster	Tokyo Dome, Tokyo

=== 2024 ===
March 6, 2024	Europe (European Union)	0 – 5	Japan	Kyocera Dome, Osaka
March 6, 2024	LP: Tom de Blok	Boxscore	WP: Kaima Taira	Kyocera Dome, Osaka

March 7, 2024	Japan	2 – 0	(European Union) Europe	Kyocera Dome, Osaka
March 7, 2024	WP: Yumeto Kanemaru; Sv: Atsuki Taneichi	Boxscore	LP: Markus Solbach	Kyocera Dome, Osaka
