= 1995 European Baseball Championship =

Tournament details
- Country: The Netherlands
- City: Haarlem
- Venue: Pim Mulier Stadium
- Dates: 7–16 July
- Teams: 10
- Defending champions: Netherlands

Final positions
- Champions: Netherlands (15th title)
- Runners-up: Italy
- Third place: Belgium
- Fourth place: Spain

Tournament statistics
- Most SBs: (Netherlands) Johnny Balentina
- Best ERA: (Spain) Carlos Ros
- Most Ks (as pitcher): (Belgium) Frank Mathys (30)

Awards
- MVP: (Netherlands) Johnny Balentina
- Top two teams qualified for the 1996 Summer Olympics

The 1995 European Baseball Championship was held in the Haarlem, the Netherlands and won by the Netherlands. Italy finished second. The top two teams qualified for the 1996 Summer Olympics. In its semifinal match, Belgium chose to not start ace pitcher Frank Mathys with Olympic qualification at stake, preferring he help the team finish in third.

The tournament expanded to 10 teams from eight teams in 1993. Few of the preliminary games were competitive, with the closest winning margin being 3 runs and the winning team scoring at least 11 runs in 15 of the 20 games. Italy was the only team that beat the Dutch or kept them under 10 runs in a game. Slovakia and Ukraine competed for the first time, with Ukraine's win over Slovakia the only victory for either team in the tournament.

== Standings ==
Pos.	Team	Record
1	Netherlands	8–1
2	Italy	6–3
3	Belgium	6–3
4	Spain	5–5
5	France	5–2
6	Germany	4–3
7	Sweden	3–4
8	Russia	2–5
9	Ukraine	1–6
10	Slovenia	0–7

== Awards ==
=== Individual awards and statistical leaders ===
Award	Player	Team
Most valuable player	Johnny Balentina	Netherlands
Best hitter	Johnny Balentina	Netherlands
Most runs scored	Johnny Balentina	Netherlands
Most stolen bases	Johnny Balentina	Netherlands
Best pitcher (win–loss record)	Frank Mathys, 3–0	Belgium
Most strikeouts	Mathys, 30	Belgium
Best pitcher (earned run average)	Carlos Ros	Spain
Most home runs	Arnaud Fau, 5	France
Most runs batted in	Edsel Martis	Netherlands

=== All-Star team ===
Position	Player	Team
Pitcher	Massimilliano Masin	Italy
Catcher	Johnny Balentina	Netherlands
First baseman	Eric de Bruin	Netherlands
Second baseman	Stephan Jäger	Germany
Third baseman	Yevgeny Puchkov	Russia
Shortstop	Andrea Evangelisti	Italy
Outfield	Oscar Rebolleda	Spain
Outfield	Roberto De Franceschi	Italy
Outfield	Arnaud Fau	France
Designated hitter	Edsel Martis	Netherlands
