= Baseball at the 2028 Summer Olympics =

Baseball at the Games of the XXXIV Olympiad
- Venue: Dodger Stadium; Los Angeles, California
- Dates: July 13–19, 2028
- No. of events: 1
- Competitors: 144 from 6 nations

Baseball will be featured at the 2028 Summer Olympics at Dodger Stadium in Los Angeles, for the first time since the 2020 Summer Olympics. After not being featured at the Paris Summer Olympics in 2024, baseball/softball was approved as one of five optional sports for 2028.

== Qualification ==
Six national teams will qualify for the Olympic baseball tournament.

The United States automatically qualified, as the host nation. Two teams from the Americas, the Dominican Republic and Venezuela, qualified through the 2026 World Baseball Classic in March 2026. Additionally, two teams will qualify through the 2027 WBSC Premier12 in November 2027, with one being the highest placed team from Asia and the other from either Europe or Oceania. The final team to qualify will be decided at the Final Qualifying Tournament, held no later than March 2028. The event will feature the top two unqualified teams from the Asian Baseball Championship, two teams from the European Men's Baseball Championship, one team from the Oceania Baseball Championship, and the winner of the Africa Cup Baseball Championship.

Event		Dates	Location(s)	Berth(s)	Qualified
Host nation		—N/a	—N/a	1	United States
2026 World Baseball Classic	Americas	March 5–17, 2026	(United States) Miami (Note: The World Baseball Classic was played in the United States, Puerto Rico, and Japan, with the final in Miami.)	2	Dominican Republic; Venezuela
2027 WBSC Premier12	Asia	November 8–21, 2027	(Japan) Tokyo	1	(Note: China, Chinese Taipei, Japan, and South Korea are eligible for qualification through this path.)
2027 WBSC Premier12	Europe/Oceania	November 8–21, 2027	(Japan) Tokyo	1	(Note: Australia, the Czech Republic, Great Britain, Italy, the Netherlands, and Spain are eligible for qualification through this path.)
Final Qualifying Tournament		March 2028	TBD	1	
Total				6	

== Competition schedule ==
As of November 12, 2025

Legend

PR	Preliminary round	QF	Quarterfinals	SF	Semifinals	B	Bronze medal game	F	Gold medal game

Thu 13	Fri 14	Sat 15	Sun 16	Mon 17	Tue 18	Wed 19	
PR		PR		QF	SF	B	F

== Team squads ==
Each national team may name a squad of 24 players, with a total of 144 athletes participating in the Olympic baseball tournament.

Major League Baseball commissioner Rob Manfred has publicly expressed interest in the idea of major league players participating in the Olympics, calling it "a unique opportunity to market the sport worldwide." The 2028 competition taking place in July would somewhat align with the traditional time frame for the MLB All-Star break, in which no regular season games are played one day before through two days after the annual All-Star Game. In negotiations with the MLB Players Association, the league proposed an extended break for the 2028 season that would begin on July 9, set the All-Star Game on July 11 in San Francisco, and resume the regular season on July 21.

Japan's Nippon Professional Baseball is expected to take a customary break, similar to the 2020 Olympics.

== Competition format ==
In the group stage teams will be broken into two groups of three. Each team will play two games. The top team from each group will advance automatically to the semifinals, while the remaining four teams will play in the quarterfinals for the final two semifinal spots.

== See also ==
- Softball at the 2028 Summer Olympics
