= Italy national baseball team =

Team representing Italy in baseball competitions

Information
- Country: Italy
- Federation: Italian Baseball Softball Federation
- Confederation: WBSC Europe
- Manager: Francisco Cervelli
- Captain: Vinnie Pasquantino

WBSC ranking
- Current: 13 ▲1 (26 October 2026)
- Highest: 9 (December 2012)
- Lowest: 17 (5 times; latest in December 2021)

Uniforms

Olympic Games
- Appearances: 4 (first in 1992)
- Best result: 6th (2 times, most recent in 2000)

World Baseball Classic
- Appearances: 6 (first in 2006)
- Best result: 4th (1 time, in 2026)

World Cup
- Appearances: 17 (first in 1970)
- Best result: 4th (2 times, most recent in 1998)

Intercontinental Cup
- Appearances: 12 (first in 1973)
- Best result: (bronze) 3rd (1 time, in 2010)

European Championship
- Appearances: 34 (first in 1954)
- Best result: (gold) 1st (10 times, most recent in 2012)

The Italy national baseball team (Italian: Nazionale italiana di baseball) represents Italy in international baseball competitions. The national team was ranked 16th in the world at 2022. Like the country's association football team and other national teams, the national baseball team is known as the Azzurri ("the Blues"), and wears traditional Savoy blue on its uniforms.

Along with the Netherlands, Italy is traditionally one of the strongest European baseball powerhouses, having won the European Baseball Championship ten times since 1954 (most recently in 2012). The country has also competed in all six editions of the World Baseball Classic (WBC) since 2006, reaching the semifinals at the 2026 WBC.

== History ==
=== Debut and European competition ===
The Italian national team played its first international in a friendly against Spain on August 31, 1952, in Rome; American actor Gregory Peck, in Rome for the filming of the movie Roman Holiday, was in attendance.

Italy debuted at the inaugural European Baseball Championship in 1954, which it won. Its early dominance in the competition was short-lived after the debut of the Netherlands in 1956, which created a heated rivalry. Italian ace Giulio Glorioso often went up against the Netherlands' Han Urbanus; Glorioso pitched two no-hitters for Italy during this period, a 1–0 loss to the Netherlands in 1960, and a win against West Germany during the 1973 European Championship.

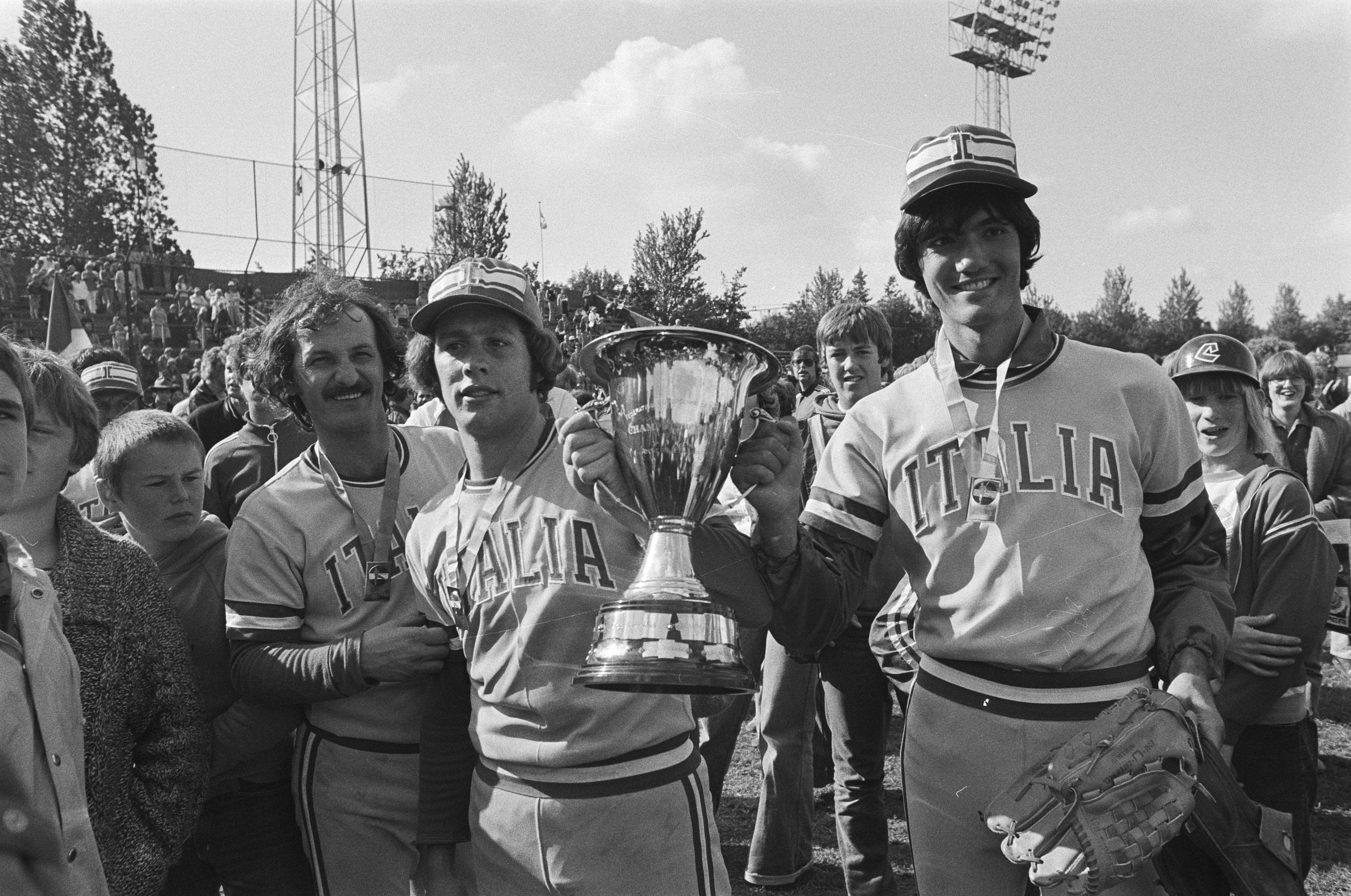
Italy won the 1977 European Baseball Championship

Since then, the team has won nine gold medals at the tournament, with their most recent being in 2012. In total, Italy has won 27 medals (16 silver, 3 bronze). The only country to have fared better is the Netherlands (21 gold, 7 silver). Italy served as the host nation for the 1956, 1964, 1971, 1979, 1983, 1991, and 1999 games.

At the 2019 European Baseball Championship, coming in second and winning the silver medal. Among the players competing for it were John Andreoli, Chris Colabello, Filippo Crepaldi, Murilo Gouvea, Luis Lugo, Alessandro Maestri, Drew Maggi, Giuseppe Mazzanti, Sebastiano Poma, and Alessandro Vaglio.

=== Italy on the global stage ===
In the 2006 Intercontinental Cup, held in Taichung, Taiwan from November 9–19, Italy finished sixth. They secured an impressive 13–3 victory over Chinese Taipei in their first game of the tournament, however, they lost their next three match-ups to Netherlands, Cuba, and Australia (13 innings). After coming back with a victory against the Philippines, Italy lost their next two to Japan and South Korea to end the round robin first phase of the tournament with a 2–5 record. Italy came back to beat South Korea in the first game of the following round, 8–3. In the battle for fifth place, Italy lost to Australia, 3–2.

On November 9, 2007, Italy handed the U.S.A. team their only loss in Team U.S.A.'s route to win the 2007 Baseball World Cup in Taiwan. It was the U.S.'s first loss to Italy in 21 years and the first time it ever lost to Italy with professional players, as the team consisted of Major League Baseball players and top minor league prospects. Both Italy and Panama ended up with 3–4 records in the 2007 games; however, Panama's 5.85 run ratio versus Italy's 4.73 placed them in fifth place while Italy settled for sixth.

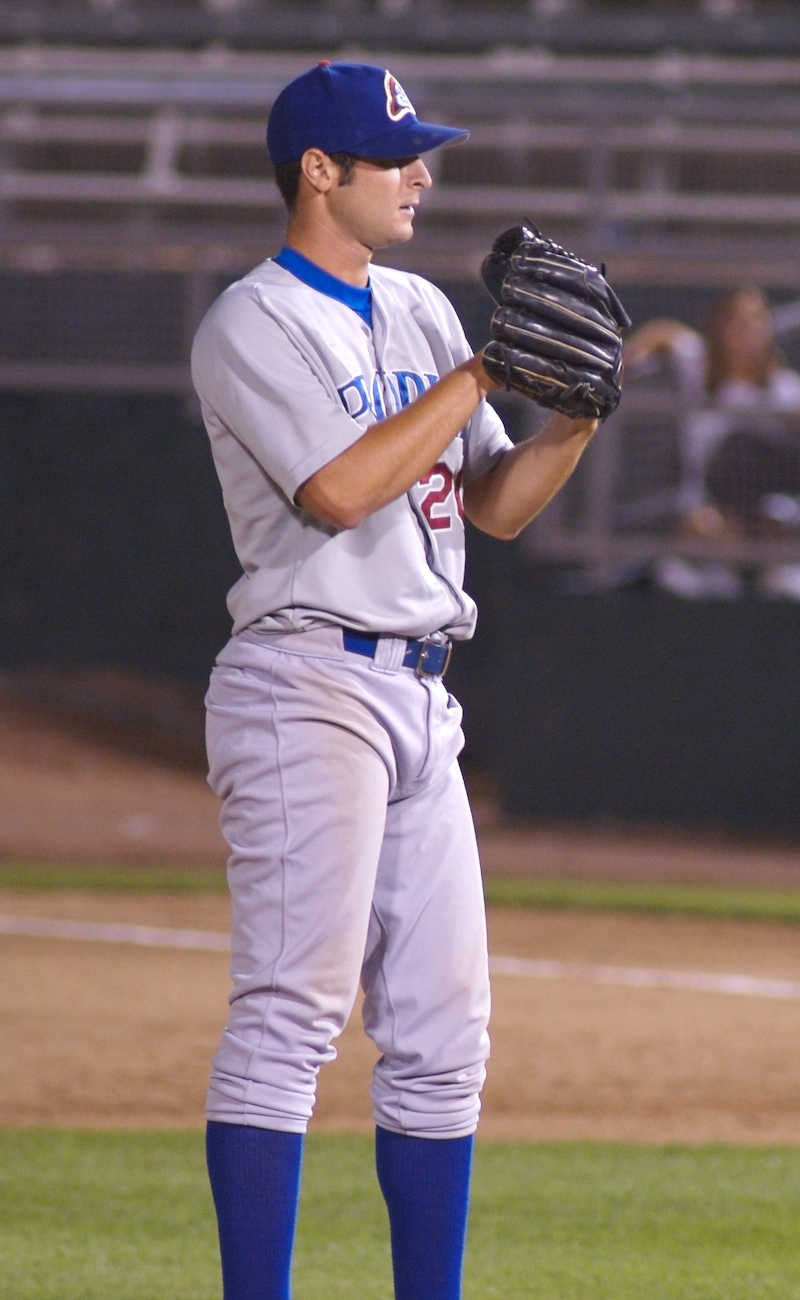
Alessandro Maestri was a longtime member of the Italian national team

The 2009 Baseball World Cup took place from September 9–27. Seven European countries, including Italy, hosted and participated in the tournament of 22 teams. The event was made up of five groups consisting of four teams each, for a total of 20 teams. Italy (Bollate, Bologna, Codogno, Florence, Godo, Macerata, Parma, Piacenza, Reggio Emilia, Rimini, San Marino, Turin, Trieste, Verona, and Vicenza) and Netherlands (Rotterdam, Haarlem and Amsterdam) serve as hosts of the 16 teams of the second round (September 14–20), and therefore received first round byes. The group Italy hosted in the second round included Australia, Canada, Taiwan, Japan, Mexico, Netherlands Antilles and the U.S.A.. Italy's first three match-ups against Chinese Taipei, Mexico, and Australia all resulted in losses. Their first victory came against Japan on September 18. Italy lost two more to Canada and the U.S.A. before winning their final game against Netherlands Antilles. Italy finished the second round with a 2–5 record, and were eliminated.

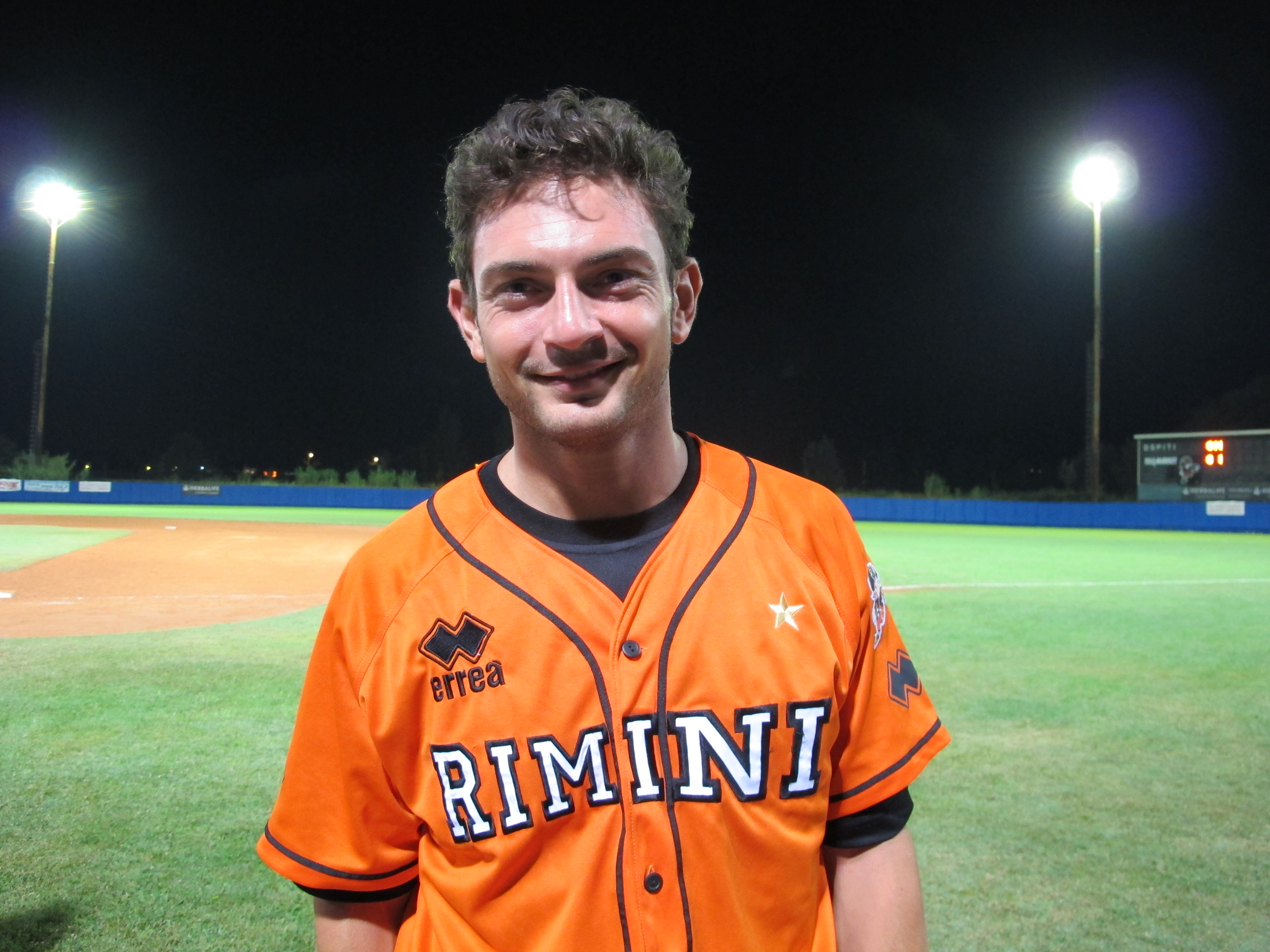
Mario Chiarini is the captain of the national team since 2010

At the 2010 Intercontinental Cup, Italy gained the first medal in the history of the tournament, beating Chinese Taipei 4–3 in the bronze medal game,.

=== World Baseball Classic ===
At the inaugural World Baseball Classic in 2006, a new international tournament organized by Major League Baseball with IBAF sanction, Italy competed in Pool D. The pool, which included Venezuela, the Dominican Republic and Australia, was played in Lake Buena Vista, Florida, at The Ballpark at Disney's Wide World of Sports. Italy secured an impressive 10–0 win over Australia in its first game, invoking the mercy rule after seven innings. However, they dropped their next two games to Venezuela, 6–0, and the Dominican Republic, 8–3, and failed to qualify for the second round of the tournament.

With only ten players on their roster with any major league affiliation, Italy was a heavy underdog in Pool C of the 2009 World Baseball Classic. With Canada, the U.S.A. & Venezuela completing Pool C, it was arguably the toughest pool in the WBC. Prior to the start of the WBC, Italy played two spring training games against the Washington Nationals and New York Mets. Italy trailed through most of the game against the Nationals until Chris Denorfia and Michael Costanzo drove in a run apiece in the seventh inning, and an eighth-inning two-run home run by Valentino Pascucci tied the game at six. A ninth-inning walk-off three-run home run by Roger Bernadina capped off a late rally in the Nats' 9–6 victory over Italy. Against the Mets, Italy led 2–0 going into the ninth inning. Cory Sullivan hit a two-run home run to tie the game at two, and Jeremy Reed doubled in Daniel Murphy to give the Mets a 3–2 victory.

Italy was again shut out by Venezuela in their first 2009 WBC game, 7–0 on March 7. Starter Mark DiFelice held Venezuela scoreless through the first four innings; however, Venezuela immediately took advantage of Italy's less experienced bullpen, exploding for 4 runs in the fifth. Against Canada on March 9, Italy pulled off one of the more surprising upsets in the 2009 WBC, winning 6–2, and eliminating the heavily favored Canadian team. Italy led 3–0 heading into the fourth inning, until Canada jumped on starter Dan Serafini for two runs. With the bases loaded and only one out, reliever Chris Cooper struck out Peter Orr, then got Chris Barnwell to fly out to center to end the threat, and keep Italy in the lead. In all, Italy's bullpen pitched six innings without giving up a run. With this victory, Italy faced their nemeses, Venezuela, a second time. After three scoreless innings pitched by Italian starter Adam Ottavino, Venezuela again dominated Italy's bullpen, scoring four runs in the fourth, and five in the fifth to win 10–1, and eliminate Italy from the World Baseball Classic.

Again considered a heavy underdog at the 2013 World Baseball Classic, Italy won its first two games in Pool D, 6–5 with a 9th-inning comeback over Mexico and 14–4 over Canada in a game called in the 8th inning due to the mercy rule. They lost both games in Round 2 against the Dominican Republic and Puerto Rico, thus eliminating them from the tournament.

=== Under Mike Piazza ===
Mike Piazza, the former MLB player and National Baseball Hall of Fame inductee, was named the manager of the national team in 2019. He replaced Gilberto Gerali, who resigned when Italy failed to qualify for the 2020 Tokyo Olympics. Piazza had previously played for Italy at the 2006 Classic, and served as the team's hitting coach at the 2009 and 2013 WBCs. As part of his contract, he exercises control over all of the national federation's youth development system. His debut as Italy's manager was planned for the 2021 World Baseball Classic, but it was delayed due to the COVID-19 pandemic.

At the 2021 European Baseball Championship held in Piedmont, the Azzurri defeated Spain to earn the bronze medal, after having lost to Israel in the semifinals. Piazza, who left partway through the tournament for his father's funeral, was replaced on the bench by Doriano Bindi.

Piazza selects mostly Italian Americans and other players from the Italian diaspora, particularly in the World Baseball Classic. Piazza has explained the practice, telling Italian media in 2024 that "sometimes you have to take a step back to move forward." He added that "my dream is to develop a native Italian in every position. Then we can have a player with dual citizenship here and there, but mainly a squadra tricolore. That is the goal."

On January 24, 2025, Piazza was replaced as manager of the senior national team by Francisco Cervelli.

=== Francisco Cervelli Era ===
Under Francisco Cervelli's leadership, Italy delivered its best performance in international play with a 5 win undefeated run in the 2026 World Baseball Classic, including a surprising 8–6 victory over the United States in pool play. Italy advanced to the quarterfinals following a 9–1 victory over Team Mexico, then defeated Puerto Rico 8–6 to reach the semifinals for the first time, the furthest the Italian team has made it. Team Italy's historic WBC run came to an end in the semifinals with a 4–2 loss to Venezuela.

== Current roster ==
J.J. D'Orazio will replace captain Alberto Mineo, who will miss the tournament after suffering an injury during training camp. Kyle Teel was injured in the game against the United States on March 10; he was replaced by bullpen catcher Andres Annunziata for the remainder of the group stage, with the expectation of adding Mickey Gasper for quarterfinal play.

Manager: Francisco Cervelli

Coaches: Allard Baird, Sal Fasano, Alex Maestri, Frank Menechino, Lipso Nava, Jorge Posada, Dave Righetti and Ron Wotus

Player	No.	Pos.	Date of birth (age)	Team	League	Birthplace
Samuel Aldegheri	12	LHP	September 19, 2001 (aged 24)	(United States) Los Angeles Angels	Major League Baseball	(Italy) Verona
Dan Altavilla	53	RHP	September 8, 1992 (aged 33)	(United States) Minnesota Twins (minors)	Minor League Baseball	(United States) Greenock, Pennsylvania
Andres Annunziata	77	C	December 5, 2005 (aged 20)	(Italy) Nettuno 1945	Serie A1	(Venezuela) Cagua
Sam Antonacci	10	IF	February 6, 2003 (aged 23)	(United States) Chicago White Sox (minors)	Minor League Baseball	(United States) Springfield, Illinois
Jon Berti	1	IF	January 22, 1990 (aged 36)	Free agent		(United States) Troy, Michigan
Jac Caglianone	14	RF/1B	February 9, 2003 (aged 23)	(United States) Kansas City Royals	Major League Baseball	(United States) Tampa, Florida
Dominic Canzone	8	OF	August 16, 1997 (aged 28)	(United States) Seattle Mariners	Major League Baseball	(United States) Cleveland, Ohio
Dylan DeLucia	22	RHP	August 1, 2000 (aged 25)	(United States) Cleveland Guardians (minors)	Minor League Baseball	(United States) Port Orange, Florida
Zach Dezenzo	4	IF	May 11, 2000 (aged 25)	(United States) Houston Astros	Major League Baseball	(United States) Canton, Ohio
J.J. D'Orazio	28	C	July 23, 1994 (aged 31)	(United States) Los Angeles Angels (minors)	Minor League Baseball	(Venezuela) Maracay
Andrew Fischer	11	IF	June 3, 2004 (aged 21)	(United States) Milwaukee Brewers (minors)	Minor League Baseball	(United States) Brick Township, New Jersey
Matt Festa	52	RHP	March 11, 1993 (aged 32)	(United States) Cleveland Guardians	Major League Baseball	(United States) Brooklyn, New York
Gordon Graceffo	44	RHP	March 17, 2000 (aged 25)	(United States) St. Louis Cardinals	Major League Baseball	(United States) Wayne, New Jersey
Alek Jacob	37	RHP	June 16, 1998 (aged 27)	(United States) San Diego Padres	Major League Baseball	(United States) Spokane, Washington
Joe La Sorsa	75	LHP	April 29, 1998 (aged 27)	(United States) Pittsburgh Pirates (minors)	Minor League Baseball	(United States) Mount Kisco, New York
Michael Lorenzen	24	RHP	January 4, 1992 (aged 34)	(United States) Colorado Rockies	Major League Baseball	(United States) Anaheim, California
Ron Marinaccio	97	RHP	July 1, 1995 (aged 30)	(United States) San Diego Padres	Major League Baseball	(United States) Toms River, New Jersey
Jakob Marsee	2	IF	June 28, 2001 (aged 24)	(United States) Miami Marlins	Major League Baseball	(United States) Dearborn, Michigan
Renzo Martini	41	IF	August 25, 1992 (aged 33)	San Marino Baseball Club	Serie A1	(Venezuela) Valera
Miles Mastrobuoni	5	UTL	October 31, 1995 (aged 30)	(United States) Seattle Mariners	Major League Baseball	(United States) San Ramon, California
Nick Morabito	7	OF	May 7, 2003 (aged 22)	(United States) New York Mets (minors)	Minor League Baseball	(United States) McLean, Virginia
Kyle Nicolas	19	RHP	February 22, 1999 (aged 27)	(United States) Pittsburgh Pirates	Major League Baseball	(United States) Massillon, Ohio
Aaron Nola	27	RHP	June 4, 1993 (aged 32)	(United States) Philadelphia Phillies	Major League Baseball	(United States) Baton Rouge, Louisiana
Dante Nori	16	OF	October 7, 2004 (aged 21)	(United States) Philadelphia Phillies (minors)	Minor League Baseball	(Canada) Toronto
Adam Ottavino	0	RHP	November 22, 1985 (aged 40)	Free agent		(United States) Manhattan, New York
Vinnie Pasquantino (C)	9	1B	October 10, 1997 (aged 28)	(United States) Kansas City Royals	Major League Baseball	(United States) Richmond, Virginia
Thomas Saggese	6	IF	April 10, 2002 (aged 23)	(United States) St. Louis Cardinals	Major League Baseball	(United States) Carlsbad, California
Claudio Scotti	98	RHP	July 8, 1998 (aged 27)	(Italy) Parma Baseball	Serie A1	(Italy) Rome
Kyle Teel	3	C	February 15, 2002 (aged 24)	(United States) Chicago White Sox	Major League Baseball	(United States) Ridgewood, New Jersey
Gabriele Quattrini	80	RHP	July 18, 1996 (aged 29)	(Italy) Macerata Angels	Serie A1	(Italy) Potenza Picena
Greg Weissert	57	RHP	February 4, 1995 (aged 31)	(United States) Boston Red Sox	Major League Baseball	(United States) Bay Shore, New York

Designated Pitcher Pool: Matteo Bocchi, Jonah Dipoto, Joe Jacques, Camden Minacci, Claudio Scotti, and Mattia Sireus

== Results and fixtures ==
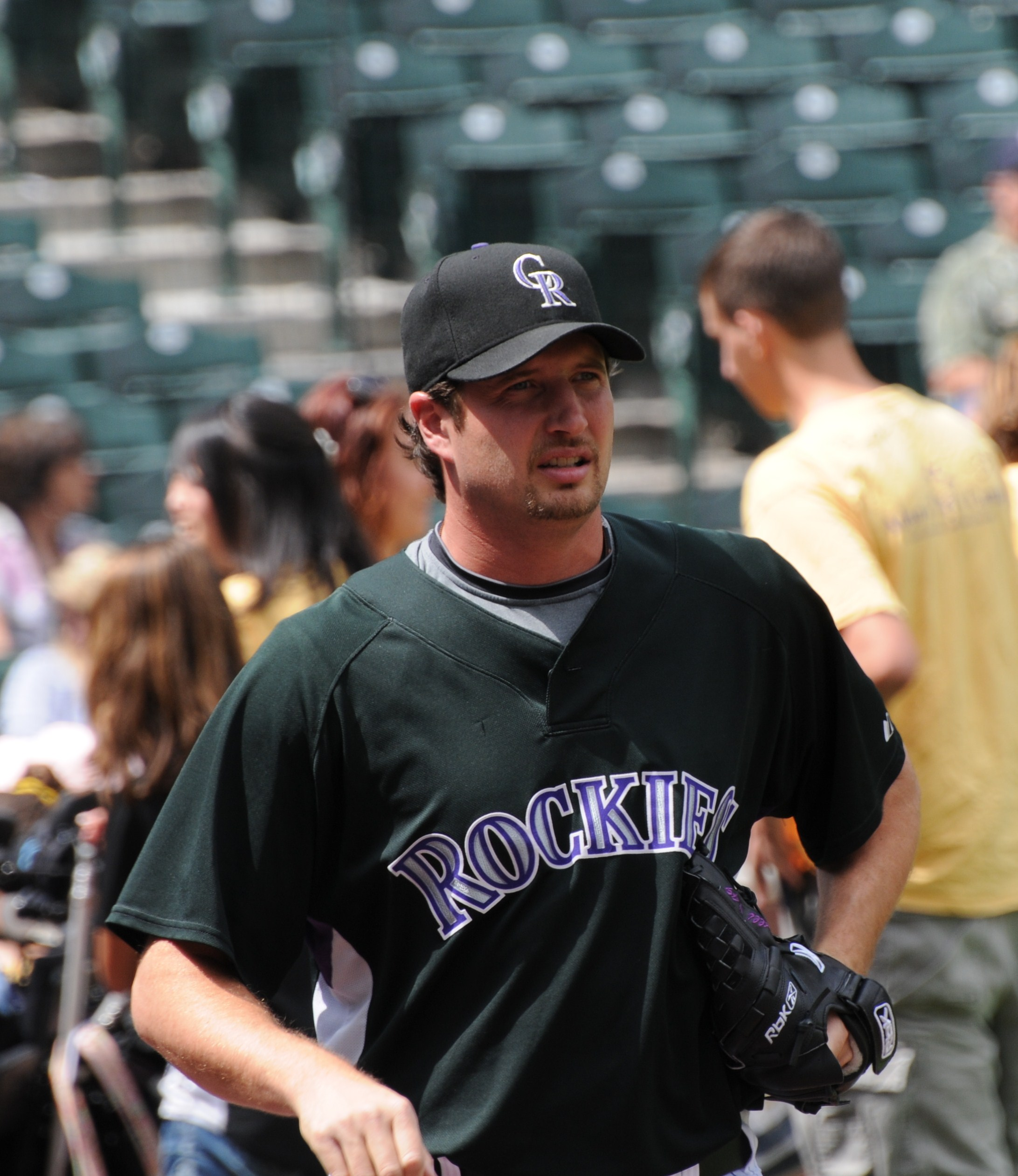
MLB pitcher Jason Grilli represented Italy in the 2006 & 2009 WBC

The following is a list of professional baseball match results currently active in the latest version of the WBSC World Rankings, as well as any future matches that have been scheduled.

Legend

Win Lose Void or postponed Fixture

=== 2019 ===
Euro Championship GS	September 7	France	2–16	Italy	Bonn 1, Germany
Euro Championship GS	15:30 CET		Boxscore		Attendance: 850

Euro Championship GS	September 8	Italy	2–1 (F/10)	Croatia	Weyersberg Park, Germany
Euro Championship GS	16:00 CET		Boxscore		Attendance: 150

Euro Championship GS	September 9	Italy	10–1	Austria	Bonn 1, Germany
Euro Championship GS	11:00 CET		Boxscore		Attendance: 100

Euro Championship GS	September 10	Spain	3–13	Italy	Bonn 1, Germany
Euro Championship GS	15:00 CET		Boxscore		Attendance: 250

Euro Championship GS	September 11	Italy	11–4	Belgium	Bonn 1, Germany
Euro Championship GS	11:00 CET		Boxscore		Attendance: 80

Euro Championship QF	September 13	Italy	7–5	Germany	Bonn 1, Germany
Euro Championship QF	19:00 CET		Boxscore		Attendance: 1,000

Euro Championship SF	September 14	Israel	6–7	Italy	Bonn 1, Germany
Euro Championship SF	19:00 CET		Boxscore		Attendance: 1,000

Euro Championship F	September 16	Italy	1–5	Netherlands	Bonn 1, Germany
Euro Championship F	19:00 CET		Boxscore		Attendance: 2,000

=== 2021 ===
Euro Championship GS	September 12	Greece	3–13 (F/7)	Italy	Aluffi Stadium, Italy
Euro Championship GS	15:00 CET		Boxscore		Attendance: 600

Euro Championship GS	September 13	Italy	14–3 (F/7)	Belgium	Paschetto Stadium, Italy
Euro Championship GS	20:30 CET		Boxscore		Attendance: 550

Euro Championship GS	September 14	Austria	1–14 (F/7)	Italy	Paolo II Palace, Italy
Euro Championship GS	20:30 CET		Boxscore		Attendance: 300

Euro Championship QF	September 16	Italy	8–5	Croatia	Aluffi Stadium, Italy
Euro Championship QF	15:00 CET		Boxscore		Attendance: 200

Euro Championship SF	September 17	Israel	11–5	Italy	Paolo II Palace, Italy
Euro Championship SF	20:30 CET		Boxscore		Attendance: 585

Euro Championship 3rd	September 19	Italy	2–0	Spain	Paschetto Stadium, Italy
Euro Championship 3rd	15:00 CET		Boxscore		Attendance: 570

=== 2022 ===
Haarlem Week GS	July 8	Italy	1–2	Netherlands	Mulier Stadium, Netherlands
Haarlem Week GS	19:30 CET		Boxscore

Haarlem Week GS	July 10	Italy	0–9	United States	Mulier Stadium, Netherlands
Haarlem Week GS	12:00 CET		Boxscore

Haarlem Week GS	July 11	Curaçao	3–5	Italy	Mulier Stadium, Netherlands
Haarlem Week GS	15:30 CET		Boxscore

Haarlem Week GS	July 12	Japan	9–0	Italy	Mulier Stadium, Netherlands
Haarlem Week GS	12:00 CET		Boxscore

Haarlem Week GS	July 13	Italy	2–0	Cuba	Mulier Stadium, Netherlands
Haarlem Week GS	12:00 CET		Boxscore

Haarlem Week 5th	July 14	Cuba	1–5	Italy	Mulier Stadium, Netherlands
Haarlem Week 5th	12:00 CET		Boxscore

=== 2023 ===
World Baseball Classic GS	March 9	Italy	6–3 (F/10)	Cuba	Taichung Stadium, Taiwan
World Baseball Classic GS	19:00 NST	WP: Matthew Festa (1–0)	Boxscore	LP: Raidel Martínez (0–1)	Attendance: 6,217; Umpires: HP – Ki Talk Park, 1B – Mark Carlson, 2B – Chris Segal, 3B – Serge Makouchetev

World Baseball Classic GS	March 10	Italy	7–11	Chinese Taipei	Taichung Stadium, Taiwan
World Baseball Classic GS	19:00 NST	LP: Stephen Woods Jr. (0–1)	Boxscore	WP: Yen-Ching Lu (1–0); Sv: Chia-Hao Sung (1); HR: Tzu-Wei Lin (1), Yu Chang (1), Kungkuan Giljegiljaw (1)	Attendance: 18,799; Umpires: HP – Chris Segal, 1B – Nic Lentz, 2B – Shoji Arisumi, 3B – Ki Talk Park

World Baseball Classic GS	March 11	Panama	2–0	Italy	Taichung Stadium, Taiwan
World Baseball Classic GS	12:00 NST	WP: Harold Arauz (1–0); Sv: Javy Guerra (1)	Boxscore	LP: Michele Vassalotti (0–1)	Attendance: 7,732; Umpires: HP – Shoji Arisumi, 1B – Larry Vanover, 2B – Trent Thomas, 3B – Chris Segal

World Baseball Classic GS	March 12	Netherlands	1–7	Italy	Taichung Stadium, Taiwan
World Baseball Classic GS	19:00 NST	LP: Mike Bolsenbroek (0–1); HR: Chadwick Tromp (1)	Boxscore	WP: Matt Harvey (1–0)	Attendance: 4,985; Umpires: HP – Roberto Ortiz, 1B – Dan Iassogna, 2B – Serge Makouchetev, 3B – Trent Thomas

World Baseball Classic QF	March 16	Italy	3–9	Japan	Tokyo Dome, Japan
World Baseball Classic QF	19:00 JST	LP: Joe LaSorsa (0–1); HR: Dominic Fletcher (1)	Boxscore	WP: Shohei Ohtani (2–0); HR: Kazuma Okamoto (1), Masataka Yoshida (1)	Attendance: 41,723; Umpires: HP – Pat Hoberg, 1B – Laz Díaz, 2B – Delfin Colon 3B – Cuti Suarez

2023 European Baseball Championship	September 24	Hungary	2–15 (F/7)	Italy	Třebíč Na Hvězdě, Třebíč
2023 European Baseball Championship	11:00 CET		Boxscore	WP: Mattia Aldegheri (1–0)	Attendance: 168; Umpires: Edwin Louisa (HP), Sergii Bolilyi (1B), Jason Lillebo (3B)

2023 European Baseball Championship	September 25	Italy	3–8	Sweden	Třebíč Na Hvězdě, Třebíč
2023 European Baseball Championship	17:30 CET	LP: Gabriele Quattrini (0–1)	Boxscore	WP: Per Sjörs (1–0); HR: Joel Johnson (1)	Attendance: 260; Umpires: Alex Lazaro (HP), Vladimir Richter (1B), Jason Lillebo (3B)

2023 European Baseball Championship	September 26	Great Britain	11–10	Italy	Třebíč Na Hvězdě, Třebíč
2023 European Baseball Championship	17:30 CET	WP: Chris Messer (1–0); Sv: Demoi Hodge (1); HR: Nick Ward (2), Harry Ford (2)	Boxscore	WP: Alex Bassani (0–1); HR: Robel García (2)	Attendance: 360; Umpires: Sergii Bolilyi (HP), Alex Lazaro(1B), Vladimir Richter (3B)

=== 2024 ===
2024 Haarlem Baseball Week	July 13	Italy	0–4	Netherlands	Pim Mulier Stadium, Haarlem, Netherlands
2024 Haarlem Baseball Week	19:47 CET	LP: Matteo Bocchi (0-1)	Boxscore	WP: Lars Huijer (1-0)	Attendance: 4,200; Umpires: HP-Olav Steijger (NED), 1B-Peter De Haan (NED), 2B-Filip Havlik (CZE), 3B-Jeffrey Bentsnijder (NED)

2024 Haarlem Baseball Week	July 14	United States	6–4	Italy	Pim Mulier Stadium, Haarlem, Netherlands
2024 Haarlem Baseball Week	11:30 CET	WP: Jordan Huskey (1-0)	Boxscore	LP: Mattia Sireus (0-1)	Attendance: 3,100; Umpires: HP-Richard Wessel (NED), 1B-Efrem Silvania (NED), 2B-Alex Lazaro (ESP), 3B-Niek Elshof (NED)

2024 Haarlem Baseball Week	July 15	Spain	3–10	Italy	Pim Mulier Stadium, Haarlem, Netherlands
2024 Haarlem Baseball Week	15:29 CET	WP: Jorge Balboa (0-1)	Boxscore	LP: Gabriele Quattrini (1-0)	Attendance: 1,400; Umpires: HP-Niek Elshof (NED), 1B-Richard Wessel (NED), 2B-Alex Lazaro (ESP), 3B-Efrem Silvania (NED)

2024 Haarlem Baseball Week	July 16	Italy	2–8	Japan	Pim Mulier Stadium, Haarlem, Netherlands
2024 Haarlem Baseball Week	15:28 CET	LP: Mattia Aldegheri (0-1)	Boxscore	WP: Issei Watanabe (1-0)	Attendance: 1,800; Umpires: HP-Olav Steijger (NED), 1B-Filip Havlik (CZE), 2B-Peter De Haan (NED), 3B-Jeffrey Bentsnijder (NED)

2024 Haarlem Baseball Week	July 17	Chinese Taipei	5–3	Italy	Pim Mulier Stadium, Haarlem, Netherlands
2024 Haarlem Baseball Week	11:32 CET	WP: Jun-Wei Zhang (2-0)	Boxscore	LP: Alex Bassani (0-1)	Attendance: 2,000; Umpires: HP-Niek Elshof (NED), 1B-Efrem Silvania (NED), 2B-Alex Lazaro (ESP), 3B-Richard Wessel (NED)

2024 Haarlem Baseball Week Placement Round	July 18	Italy	4–13	Spain	Pim Mulier Stadium, Haarlem, Netherlands
2024 Haarlem Baseball Week Placement Round	11:28 CET	LP: Francesco Pomponi (0-1)	Boxscore	WP: Orlando La Rodriguez (1-0)	Attendance: 1,800; Umpires: HP-Efrem Silvania (NED), 1B-Richard Wessel (NED), 2B-Olav Steijger (NED), 3B-Filip Havlik (CZE)

=== 2025 ===
Euro Championship GS	September 20	Switzerland	0−18 (F/5)	Italy	Stadio Provini, Italy
Euro Championship GS	15:30 CEST		Boxscore		Attendance: 250

Euro Championship GS	September 21	Italy	16−0 (F/6)	Lithuania	Stadio Provini, Italy
Euro Championship GS	15:30 CEST		Boxscore		Attendance: 200

Euro Championship GS	September 22	Greece	4−9 (F/7)	Italy	Stadio Provini, Italy
Euro Championship GS	14:30 CEST		Boxscore		Attendance: 110

Euro Championship R16	September 24	Italy	6−2	France	Neptunus Familiestadion, Netherlands
Euro Championship R16	19:30 CEST		Boxscore		Attendance: 330

Euro Championship QF	September 25	Italy	1−0	Germany	Neptunus Familiestadion, Netherlands
Euro Championship QF	15:00 CEST		Boxscore		Attendance: 950

Euro Championship SF	September 26	Italy	8−5	Czech Republic	Neptunus Familiestadion, Netherlands
Euro Championship SF	15:00 CEST		Boxscore		Attendance: 953

Euro Championship F	September 27	Italy	5−6	Netherlands	Neptunus Familiestadion, Netherlands
Euro Championship F	19:30 CEST		Boxscore		Attendance: 3,000

=== 2026 ===
World Baseball Classic GS	March 7	Brazil	0−8	Italy	Daikin Park, United States
World Baseball Classic GS	12:00 CST	LP: Hector Villarroel (0−1)	Boxscore	WP: Alek Jacob (1−0); HR: Dante Nori (2), Dominic Canzone (1)	Attendance: 29,357; Umpires: Chun Il-soo

World Baseball Classic GS	March 8	Great Britain	4−7	Italy	Daikin Park, United States
World Baseball Classic GS	12:00 CDT	LP: Nick Wells (0−1)	Boxscore	WP: Gabriele Quattrini (1−0); Sv: Greg Weissert (1); HR: Andrew Fischer (1), J.J. D'Orazio (1)	Attendance: 35,141; Umpires: David Arrieta

World Baseball Classic GS	March 10	Italy	8−6	United States	Daikin Park, United States
World Baseball Classic GS	20:00 CDT	WP: Michael Lorenzen (1−0); Sv: Greg Weissert (2); HR: Sam Antonacci (1), Jac Caglianone (1), Kyle Teel (1)	Boxscore	LP: Nolan McLean (0−1); HR: Pete Crow-Armstrong (2), Gunnar Henderson (1)	Attendance: 38,653; Umpires: Roberto Ortiz

World Baseball Classic GS	March 11	Italy	9−1	Mexico	Daikin Park, United States
World Baseball Classic GS	18:00 CDT	WP: Aaron Nola (1−0); HR: Vinnie Pasquantino (3), Jon Berti (1)	Boxscore	LP: Javier Assad (0−1)	Attendance: 39,894; Umpires: Alex Tosi

World Baseball Classic QF	March 14	Puerto Rico	6−8	Italy	Daikin Park, United States
World Baseball Classic QF	14:00 CDT	LP: Seth Lugo (1−1); HR: Willi Castro (1)	Boxscore	WP: Sam Aldegheri (1−0); Sv: Greg Weissert (3)	Attendance: 34,291; Umpires: Carlos Torres

World Baseball Classic SF	March 16	Venezuela	4−2	Italy	LoanDepot Park, United States
World Baseball Classic SF	20:00 EDT	WP: Angel Zerpa (1-0); Sv: Daniel Palencia (2)	Boxscore	LP: Michael Lorenzen (1-1)	Attendance: 35,382; Umpires: Jeremie Rehak

WBSC Premier12 Q	October 9	Colombia	v	Italy	Anella Olímpica, Spain
WBSC Premier12 Q	12:00 CEST

WBSC Premier12 Q	October 10	Spain	v	Italy	Anella Olímpica, Spain
WBSC Premier12 Q	19:00 CEST

WBSC Premier12 Q	October 11	Italy	v	Germany	Anella Olímpica, Spain
WBSC Premier12 Q	12:00 CEST

== Tournament record ==
Competition	Appearances	1st place, gold medalist(s)	2nd place, silver medalist(s)	3rd place, bronze medalist(s)	Total
World Baseball Classic	5	0	0	0	0
Olympic Games	5	0	0	0	0
Amateur World Series, Baseball World Cup, and Premier12	18	0	0	0	0
Intercontinental Cup	13	0	0	1	1
European Championship	34	10	17	4	31
Universiade		0	0	0	0
Total		10	15	4	29

=== World Baseball Classic ===
World Baseball Classic record							Qualification record			
Year	Round	Position	W	L	RS	RA	W	L	RS	RA
(United States) 2006	Group stage	10th	1	2	13	14	No qualifiers held			
(Canada) 2009	Group stage	10th	1	2	7	19	No qualifiers held			
(United States) 2013	Quarterfinals	7th	2	3	29	24	Automatically qualified			
(Mexico) 2017	Group stage	12th	1	3	26	33	Automatically qualified			
(Taiwan) (Japan) 2023	Quarterfinals	8th	2	3	23	26	Automatically qualified			
(United States) 2026	Fourth place	4th	5	1	42	21	Automatically qualified			
Total	Semifinals	6/6	12	14	140	137	-	-	-	-

Italy World Baseball Classic Record by opponent
Opponent	Tournaments met	W-L record	Largest victory		Largest defeat		Current streak
Opponent	Tournaments met	W-L record	Score	Tournament	Score	Tournament	Current streak
Australia	1	1-0	10–0 (F/7)	United States 2006	–		W1
Brazil	1	1-0	8–0	United States 2026	–		W1
Canada	2	2-0	14–4 (F/8)	United States 2013	–		W2
Chinese Taipei	1	0-1	–		11–7	Taiwan 2023	L1
Cuba	1	1-0	6–3 (F/10)	Taiwan 2023	–		W1
Dominican Republic	2	0-2	–		8–3	United States 2006	L2
Great Britain	1	1-0	7–4	United States 2026	–		W1
Japan	1	0-1	–		9–3	Japan 2023	L1
Mexico	3	3-0	9–1	United States 2026	–		W3
Netherlands	1	1-0	7–1	Taiwan 2023	–		W1
Panama	1	0-1	–		2–0	Taiwan 2023	L1
Puerto Rico	3	1-2	8–6	United States 2026	9–3	Mexico 2017	W1
United States	2	1-1	8–6	United States 2026	6–2	United States 2013	W1
Venezuela	4	0-6	–		10–1	Canada 2009	L6
Overall	6	12–14	Against AUS		Against VEN		L1
Overall	6	12–14	10–0 (F/7)	United States 2006	10–1	Canada 2009	L1

Team Italy dominated a European classic against the Netherlands (1–0) on the world stage, further solidifying its status as a European powerhouse. They have proven their efficiency against North America. Italy seems to have the formula to neutralize the region's style of play, as evidenced by their record victories against Mexico (3–0) and Canada (2–0). Venezuela's "Wall" is notable, as it is rare for a team to have five losses against a single opponent without ever having beaten them in a tournament with so few games. Similarly, Japan has a 5–0 record against China. The slogan for the 2026 tournament is “Expect everything,” and Italy surprised the world by beating the United States 8–6 in the group stage. The US team is at risk of being eliminated from the World Baseball Classic after the group stage. Some experts consider this to be Italy's most important victory ever.

Team Italia competed in the inaugural World Baseball Classic in 2006, though with a much more Americanized roster than the team ordinarily uses in international play. Of the 30 players on Italy's roster, 23 were born in the United States. A player is eligible to participate on a World Baseball Classic team if:

- The player is a citizen of the nation the team represents.
- The player is qualified for citizenship or to hold a passport under the laws of a nation represented by a team, but has not been granted citizenship or been issued a passport, then the player may be made eligible by WBCI upon petition by the player or team.
- The player is a permanent legal resident of the nation or territory the team represents.
- The player was born in the nation or territory the team represents.
- The player has one parent who is, or if deceased was, a citizen of the nation the team represents.
- The player has one parent who was born in the nation or territory the team represents.

=== Olympic Games ===
Summer Olympics record								Qualification
Year	Result	Position	W	L	%	RS	RA	Method
(United States) 1984	Preliminary	5th (Note: No medals awarded; tournament was a demonstration sport only)	1	2	.333	11	33	1983 European Baseball Championship
(Spain) 1992	Preliminary	7th	1	6	.143	25	62	1991 European Baseball Championship
(United States) 1996	Preliminary	6th	2	5	.286	32	59	1995 European Baseball Championship
(Australia) 2000	Preliminary	6th	3	4	.429	33	43	1999 European Baseball Championship
(Greece) 2004	Preliminary	8th	1	6	.143	19	58	European Qualification Tournament
(China) 2008	did not qualify							7th, 2007 European Baseball Championship
(Japan) 2020	did not qualify							5th, Africa/Europe Qualifying Event
(United States) 2028	To be determined							To be determined
Total (Note: Totals only include years 1992 to 2020, during which baseball was an official medal sport.)	4/7		7	21	.250	109	222	

Italy failed to qualify for the 2008 Summer Olympics in Beijing for the first time since baseball became an official Olympic sport in 1992. Italy's best finish in an Olympics is sixth place, which they did in both 1996 and 2000. The first time an actual baseball tournament was held at an Olympics in 1984, Italy finished with a 1–2 record, with its only victory coming against the Dominican Republic. There was no official placing as Baseball at the 1984 Summer Olympics was a demonstration sport.

At the International Olympic Committee (IOC) meeting on July 8, 2005, baseball and softball were voted out of the 2012 Summer Olympics in London, becoming the first sports voted out of the Olympics since polo was eliminated from the 1936 Summer Olympics.

Because Team Italy finished in the top five in the 2019 European Baseball Championship it moved on to the 2020 Olympics qualifiers, in Italy September 18–22.

=== WBSC Premier12 ===
WBSC Premier 12 record							Qualification record			
Year	Round	Position	W	L	RS	RA	W	L	RS	RA
(Taiwan) 2015	Group stage	12th	0	5	4	36	Qualification based on ranking			
(Mexico) (Japan) (South Korea) (Taiwan) 2019	Did not qualify						Qualification based on ranking			
(Mexico) (Japan) (Taiwan) 2024	Did not qualify						Qualification based on ranking			
(Japan) (Taiwan) 2027	Qualified						2	1	11	8

=== IBAF Amateur World Series, Baseball World Cup, and WBSC Premier12 ===
- 1970 : 10th
- 1971 : 8th
- 1972 : 15th
- 1973 : did not qualify
- 1974 : 4th

- 1976 : did not qualify
- 1978 : 6th
- 1980 : 6th
- 1982 : 10th
- 1984 : 11th

- 1986 : 6th
- 1988 : 9th
- 1990 : 10th
- 1994 : 7th
- 1998 : 4th

- 2001 : 11th
- 2003 : 14th
- 2005 : did not qualify
- 2007 : 6th
- 2009 : 12th

- 2011 : 11th

Italy's best finish in the Amateur World Series was fourth place, in 1974. In 1986, the event became known as the International Baseball Federation's (IBAF) World Cup. Italy's best finish in a Baseball World Cup is also fourth place, which they did when they served as the host nation in 1998. Italy also hosted the 1978 and 1988 games. The 2009 Baseball World Cup was hosted by Europe. It was the first time in history the World Cup was hosted by a whole continent rather than an individual country.

=== Intercontinental Cup ===
- 1973 : 6th
- 1975 : 7th
- 1977 : did not qualify
- 1979 : did not qualify
- 1981 : did not qualify
- 1983 : 4th

- 1985 : did not qualify
- 1987 : 9th
- 1989 : 8th
- 1991 : 7th
- 1993 : 8th
- 1995 : 10th

- 1997 : 6th
- 1999 : 6th
- 2002 : 7th
- 2006 : 6th
- 2010 : (bronze) 3rd

The Intercontinental Cup is another international baseball competition sponsored by the IBAF. Italy hosted the first ever Intercontinental Cup in 1973, and finished in sixth place. Italy's best finish ever was third place, which they did in the 2010 games.

=== European Baseball Championship ===
- 1954 : 1st
- 1955 : 4th
- 1956 : (bronze) 3rd
- 1957 : (bronze) 3rd
- 1958 : 2nd
- 1960 : 2nd
- 1962 : 2nd
- 1964 : 2nd
- 1965 : 2nd
- 1967 : did not qualify

- 1969 : 2nd
- 1971 : 2nd
- 1973 : 2nd
- 1975 : 1st
- 1977 : 1st
- 1979 : 1st
- 1981 : 2nd
- 1983 : 1st
- 1985 : 2nd
- 1987 : 2nd

- 1989 : 1st
- 1991 : 1st
- 1993 : 2nd
- 1995 : 2nd
- 1997 : 1st
- 1999 : 2nd
- 2001 : (bronze) 3rd
- 2003 : 5th
- 2005 : 2nd
- 2007 : 7th

- 2010 : 1st
- 2012 : 1st
- 2019 : 2nd
- 2021 : (bronze) 3rd
- 2023 : 9th
- 2025 : 2nd

== See also ==
- Italy women's national softball team
