= 1993 European Baseball Championship =

Tournament details
- Country: Sweden
- City: Stockholm
- Dates: 9–18 July
- Teams: 8
- Defending champions: Italy

Final positions
- Champions: Netherlands (14th title)
- Runners-up: Italy
- Third place: Sweden
- Fourth place: France

Tournament statistics
- Best BA: (Sweden) Johan Hasselström (.485)
- Most HRs: (Netherlands) Marcel Joost (3)
- Most SBs: (Netherlands) Eddie Dix (8)
- Most Ks (as pitcher): (Italy) Massimiliano Masin (19)

Awards
- MVP: (Netherlands) Marcel Joost

The 1993 European Baseball Championship was held in Stockholm, Sweden between 9–18 July 1993 and was won by the Netherlands. Two-time defending champion Italy finished second.

The host team, Sweden, finished third, defeating France in a best-of-five-game series. It was Sweden's first time hosting such an international baseball tournament since the 1912 Summer Olympics, and it increased baseball participation in the country. However, the Swedish baseball association lost kr 350,000 organizing the event, and Sweden has not won a medal in the competition since 1993.

Russia finished last in its first appearance in the tournament, after joining the Confederation of European Baseball in 1992 following the breakup of the Soviet Union.

== Standings ==
Pos.	Team	Record
1	Netherlands	7–1
2	Italy	5–3
3	Sweden	5–4
4	France	4–5
5	Spain	5–3
6	Belgium	4–4
7	Germany	2–6
8	Russia	1–7

== Format ==
The eight teams in the tournament were split into two groups that competed in round-robin tournaments. The top two teams in each group then advanced to a one-game semifinal. The winners and losers of each semifinal then matched up in a best-of-five-game medal round. The bottom two finishers in each initial group competed in another round-robin tournament to determine the final standings.

== Awards ==
- Most valuable player: (Netherlands) Marcel Joost
- Best hitter: (Sweden) Johan Hasselström, with a .485 batting average
- Best pitcher: (Netherlands) Patrick Klerx
- Best infielder: (Sweden) Jim Sasko
- Best outfielder: (Spain) Antonio Salazar

== Statistical leaders ==
=== Batters ===
- Most home runs: (Netherlands) Marcel Joost, 3
- Most hits: (Netherlands) Jeffrey Cranston, 18
- Most runs scored: (Netherlands) Joost, 14
- Most stolen bases: (Netherlands) Eddie Dix, 8

=== Pitchers ===
- Best win–loss record: (Sweden) Mikael Aho, (Belgium) Oswald Boermans, (Spain) Rubén Garcia, (Netherlands) Patrick Klerx, (Netherlands) Geoffrey Kohl, (Italy) Massimiliano Masin, (France) Samuel Meurant: 2–0
- Most strikeouts: (Italy) Masin, 19
- Most innings pitched: (Russia) Leonid Korneev, 25
