= 2027 WBSC Premier12 =

International baseball tournament

Tournament details
- Countries: Japan; Taiwan
- Dates: 2027
- Teams: 16 (from 4 confederations)

Tournament statistics
- Games played: 44

The 2027 WBSC Premier12 will be the fourth edition of the WBSC Premier12, a baseball championship featuring the 16 top national teams in the world, organized by the World Baseball Softball Confederation (WBSC). This tournament will be the first to include 16 teams, expanded from 12 in previous three editions.

Chinese Taipei is the defending champion. They won their first Premier12 championship, defeating final round host and defending champion Japan, 4–0, in the 2024 championship game. The United States took third place after a 6–1 win over Venezuela. WBSC president Riccardo Fraccari congratulated the champions and confirmed that the qualifiers for the 2027 tournament would begin in 2026.

== Teams ==
=== Qualification ===
The 12 highest-ranked national teams qualified to participate in the group stage, based on the WBSC World Rankings, as of 31 December 2025. The teams ranked 13–18 and two wild cards will play the qualifiers to determine the other four participants in the group stage. The WBSC originally wanted to expand the 2023 edition but, due to the COVID-19 pandemic, delayed expansion until 2027.

The teams that qualified for the opening round and the qualifiers were officially announced by WBSC in January 2026. The first of two qualification tournaments was held in October 2026 at the Anella Olímpica in Barcelona, Spain. The second will take place in November 2026 at the International Baseball and Softball Centre in Zhongshan, China.

Africa (0)

- None

Asia (3)

- Chinese Taipei
- Japan
- South Korea

Americas (7)

- Cuba
- Dominican Republic
- Mexico
- Panama
- Puerto Rico
- United States
- Venezuela

Europe (3)

- Italy
- Netherlands
- Spain (debut)

Oceania (1)

- Australia

Top 12 Rankings as of December 31, 2025
Rank	Team	Points	Confederation
1	Japan	6676	BFA
2	Chinese Taipei	5112	BFA
3	United States	4357	COPABE
4	South Korea	4192	BFA
5	Venezuela	3653	COPABE
6	Mexico	3606	COPABE
7	Puerto Rico	3393	COPABE
8	Panama	2934	COPABE
9	Netherlands	2690	CEB
10	Cuba	2622	COPABE
11	Australia	2615	BCO
12	Dominican Republic	2050	COPABE

== Rosters ==
Participating nations had to submit their final 28-man rosters no later than October 2027. WBSC rules require teams to carry at least 13 pitchers and two catchers in their squads.

== Format ==
The format will undergo several significant changes in format compared to 2024. The expansion to 16 teams and new format was announced on 24 October 2024.

=== Opening round ===
The tournament begins with four groups of four teams each playing in the 16-team opening round. Each team plays three games, in a round-robin format against each other in the group. The top two teams from each group advanced to the second round.

=== Second round ===
The tournament begins with two groups of four teams each playing in the eight-team second round. Each team plays three games, in a round robin format against each other in the group. The top two teams from each group advanced to the Super Round.

=== Super round ===
The four remaining teams who advanced to the super round, will travel to host of the finals where they will play against the top two teams that advanced from the other group.

After completion, the teams who finish first and second will play the gold medal match, while the teams placed third and fourth will play for bronze.

== Venues ==
The Taipei and Tokyo were confirmed as host cities in August 2026, with the Taipei Dome hosting one opening round group and one second round group, and the Tokyo Dome being the site of the Super Round and the medal games. The remaining venues are yet to be announced.

== Opening round ==
The groups will be announced in April 2027.

== Olympic qualification ==
The WBSC announced on February 9, 2026, that the top team from Asia and the top team from Europe/Oceania would qualify for the 2028 Summer Olympics.
