= Anella Olímpica =

Olympic Park in Barcelona, Spain

Coordinates: 41.3632598°N 2.1518317°E

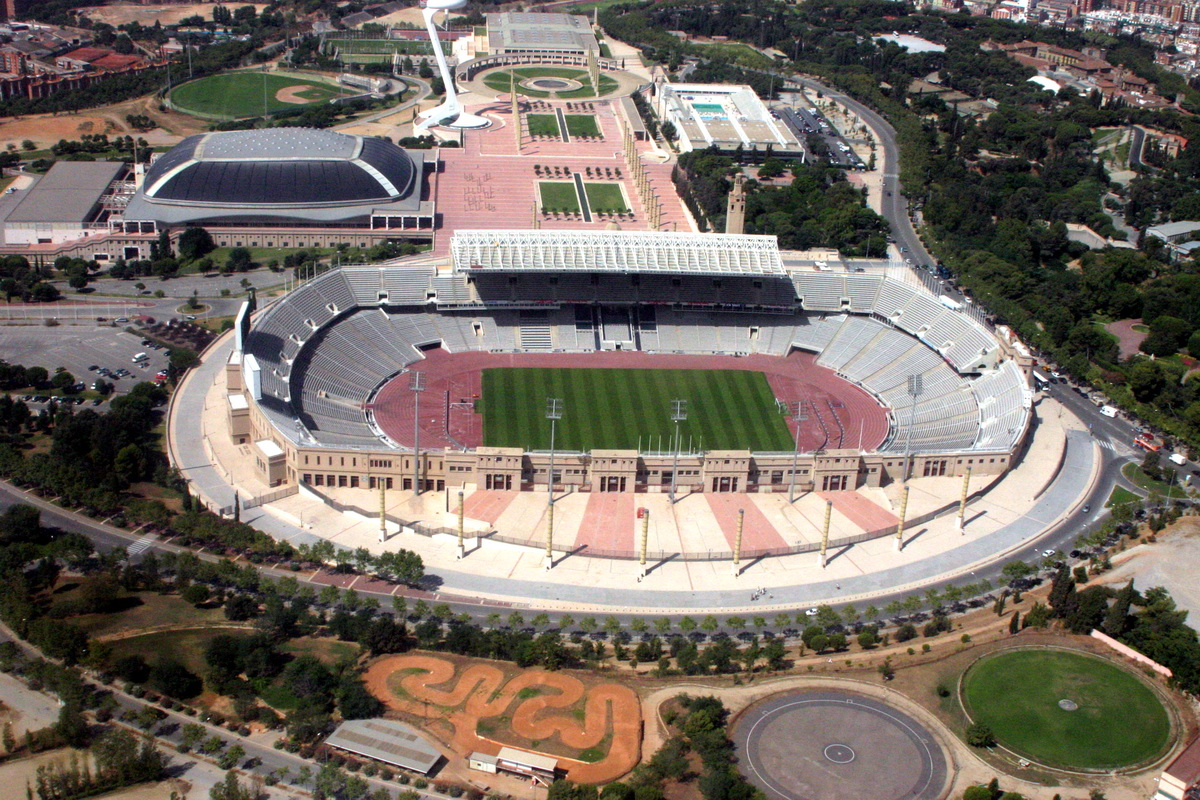
Aerial view of the Olympic Park.

Anella Olímpica (pronounced [əˈneʎə uˈlimpikə]; Catalan for 'Olympic Ring') is an Olympic Park located on the hill of Montjuïc, Barcelona, that was the main site for the 1992 Summer Olympics. The Stadium is on the land that was formerly part of the Montjuïc Circuit.

== Facilities ==
The major facilities consist of the Olympic Stadium, the Palau Sant Jordi sports hall, the telecommunications tower designed by Santiago Calatrava, the National Physical Education Institute (INEFC) and the Picornell swimming pools. The Joan Antoni Samarach Olympic and Sports Museum is also located in the Olympic Ring.

The main promenade is located uphill, midway to the Montjuïc Castle. The complex includes the main baseball field opposite the swimming pools. Surrounding areas were grass covered, and green plastic obscured the view of the near Montjuïc Cemetery. This last move showed some opposition, as can be viewed as unnatural.

The original plan was designed around the main square, Plaça d'Europa and the Olympic Stadium. Rational and minimal, it is linked to water through pools and a transversal canal. The communications tower echoed at first the tubular lamps dispersed in the "Anella" and (again) an ensemble of concrete and steel tubes, the elegant sculpture near Isozaki Arata's Palau Sant Jordi. But then, the architect Santiago Calatrava lost a project in the city in the last minute and was commissioned weeks later to re-design the tower, now more futuristic, but maybe damaging the purity of the design.
