= 1999 European Baseball Championship =

Tournament details
- Country: Italy
- Dates: 23 July – 1 August 1999
- Teams: 12
- Defending champions: Italy

Final positions
- Champions: Netherlands (16th title)
- Runners-up: Italy
- Third place: France
- Fourth place: Russia

Tournament statistics
- Most HRs: (Netherlands) Evert-Jan 't Hoen
- Best ERA: (France) Robin Roy

Awards
- MVP: (Italy) Daniel Newman

The 1999 European Baseball Championship was won by the Netherlands. It was held in Bologna, Parma, and Rimini, Italy, and the host team finished in second. By finishing in first and second, the Dutch and Italian teams qualified for the 2000 Summer Olympics. Because it was an Olympic qualifier, the tournament used wood bats, which lowered scoring.

The undefeated Dutch team featured Robert Eenhoorn, Evert-Jan 't Hoen, and Rikkert Faneyte.

== Standings ==
Pos.	Team	Record
1	Netherlands	8–0
2	Italy	7–1
3	France	6–2
4	Russia	4–4
5	Spain	5–3
6	Belgium	3–5
7	Sweden	3–5
8	Czech Republic	4–4
9	Great Britain	3–4
10	Germany	2–5
11	Croatia	2–5
12	Slovenia	0–7

== Awards ==
=== Individual Awards ===
Award	Player	Team
Most Valuable Player	Daniel Newman	Italy
Best Hitter	Newman	Italy
Outstanding Defensive Player	Félix Cano	Spain
Best Pitcher (W–L)	Carlos Ros	Spain
Best earned run average	Robin Roy	France
Most home runs	Evert-Jan 't Hoen	Netherlands
Most runs scored	Rikkert Faneyte	Netherlands
Most runs batted in	Manuel Gasparri	Italy
Most stolen bases	Alexander Nizov	Russia

=== All-Star Team ===
Position	Player	Team
Left-handed pitcher	Carlos Ros	Spain
Right-handed pitcher	Robin Roy	France
Catcher	Andrej Selivanov	Russia
First base	Andrea Castrì	Italy
Second base	Tomáš Ovesný	Czech Republic
Third base	Evert-Jan 't Hoen	Netherlands
Shortstop	Jendrik Speer	Germany
Left field	Claudio Liverziani	Italy
Center field	Peter Stroobants	Belgium
Right field	Daniel Newman	Italy
Designated hitter	Elston Hansen	Netherlands
