= 2021 European Baseball Championship – Qualification =

European Baseball Championship Qualifier 2021
Tournament details
- Countries: Lithuania; Russia; Serbia; Slovakia
- Dates: June 29 – July 4, 2021
- Teams: 17

Tournament statistics
- Games played: 32

The qualifiers for the 2021 European Baseball Championship took place from June 29 to July 4, 2021. The top 12 teams from the 2019 European Baseball Championship automatically qualified for the 2021 tournament. The qualifiers took place in Belgrade, Serbia, Bratislava, Slovakia, Moscow, Russia and Utena, Lithuania. They consisted of three tournaments with four teams each and one tournament with five teams. One team from each tournament qualified for the 2021 European Baseball Championship.

== Groups ==
=== Grope Moscow ===
Grope Moscow took place at the RusStar Arena Ballpark in Moscow, Russia, on June 29 to July 4, 2021. Russia defeated Belarus to qualify for the European Championship.

==== Round robin ====
Pos	Team	Pld	W	L	RF	RA	PCT	GB	Qualification
1	Russia (H)	4	4	0	80	4	1.000	—	Final
2	Belarus	4	3	1	52	33	.750	1	Final
3	Switzerland	4	2	2	65	38	.500	2	
4	Slovenia	4	1	3	30	60	.250	3	
5	Turkey	4	0	4	11	103	.000	4	

Source: WBSC Europe
(H) Hosts

Date	Local time	Road team	Score	Home team	Inn.	Venue	Game duration	Attendance	Boxscore
June 29, 2021	11:00	Belarus	31–2	Turkey	5	RusStar Arena Ballpark	2:35	50	Boxscore
June 29, 2021	19:00	Slovenia	0–20	Russia	5	RusStar Arena Ballpark	1:47	250	Boxscore
June 30, 2021	11:00	Slovenia	8–13	Belarus		RusStar Arena Ballpark	3:03	50	Boxscore
June 30, 2021	19:00	Switzerland	4–19	Russia	6	RusStar Arena Ballpark	2:08	300	Boxscore
July 1, 2021	11:00	Turkey	7–30	Switzerland	5	RusStar Arena Ballpark	2:51	50	Boxscore
July 1, 2021	19:00	Russia	17–0	Belarus	5	RusStar Arena Ballpark	1:35	350	Boxscore
July 2, 2021	11:00	Switzerland	25–4	Slovenia	5	RusStar Arena Ballpark	2:20	50	Boxscore
July 2, 2021	19:00	Russia	24–0	Turkey	5	RusStar Arena Ballpark	1:56	100	Boxscore
July 3, 2021	11:00	Turkey	2–18	Slovenia	5	RusStar Arena Ballpark	2:10	50	Boxscore
July 3, 2021	19:00	Belarus	8–6	Switzerland		RusStar Arena Ballpark	2:39	150	Boxscore

==== Final ====
Date	Local time	Road team	Score	Home team	Inn.	Venue	Game duration	Attendance	Boxscore
July 4, 2021	14:00	Belarus	1–4	Russia		RusStar Arena Ballpark	1:57	600	Boxscore

=== Grope Utena ===
Grope Utena took place at the Utenos Hipodromas in Utena, Lithuania, on June 30 to July 3, 2021. Greece defeated Lithuania to qualify for the European Championship.

==== Round robin ====
Pos	Team	Pld	W	L	RF	RA	PCT	GB	Qualification
1	Lithuania (H)	3	3	0	32	12	1.000	—	Final
2	Greece	3	2	1	28	9	.667	1	Final
3	Romania	3	1	2	8	29	.333	2	
4	Poland	3	0	3	6	24	.000	3	

Source: WBSC Europe
(H) Hosts

Date	Local time	Road team	Score	Home team	Inn.	Venue	Game duration	Attendance	Boxscore
June 30, 2021	11:00	Poland	0–7	Greece		Utenos Hipodromas	2:27	60	Boxscore
June 30, 2021	16:00	Romania	2–12	Lithuania	7	Utenos Hipodromas	2:23	103	Boxscore
July 1, 2021	11:00	Greece	14–0	Romania	7	Utenos Hipodromas	1:57	20	Boxscore
July 1, 2021	16:00	Lithuania	11–3	Poland		Utenos Hipodromas	3:11	140	Boxscore
July 2, 2021	11:00	Romania	6–3	Poland		Utenos Hipodromas	3:07	50	Boxscore
July 2, 2021	16:00	Greece	7–9	Lithuania		Utenos Hipodromas	2:57	140	Boxscore

==== Final ====
Date	Local time	Road team	Score	Home team	Inn.	Venue	Game duration	Attendance	Boxscore
July 3, 2021	12:00	Greece	8–4	Lithuania		Utenos Hipodromas	3:15	300	Boxscore

=== Grope Bratislava ===
Grope Bratislava took place at the Baseballové ihrisko Apollo in Bratislava, Slovakia, on June 30 to July 3, 2021. Slovakia defeated Ireland to qualify for the European Championship.

==== Round robin ====
Pos	Team	Pld	W	L	RF	RA	PCT	GB	Qualification
1	Slovakia (H)	3	3	0	30	8	1.000	—	Final
2	Ireland	3	2	1	27	19	.667	1	Final
3	Hungary	3	1	2	10	22	.333	2	
4	Finland	3	0	3	5	23	.000	3	

Source: WBSC Europe
(H) Hosts

Date	Local time	Road team	Score	Home team	Inn.	Venue	Game duration	Attendance	Boxscore
June 30, 2021	11:00	Finland	1–6	Ireland		Baseballové ihrisko Apollo	2:33	70	Boxscore
June 30, 2021	17:00	Hungary	2–3	Slovakia		Baseballové ihrisko Apollo	2:10	210	Boxscore
July 1, 2021	11:00	Ireland	16–3	Hungary	7	Baseballové ihrisko Apollo	2:37	50	Boxscore
July 1, 2021	17:00	Slovakia	12–1	Finland	7	Baseballové ihrisko Apollo	2:00	180	Boxscore
July 2, 2021	11:00	Hungary	5–3	Finland		Baseballové ihrisko Apollo	2:56	30	Boxscore
July 2, 2021	17:00	Ireland	5–15	Slovakia	8	Baseballové ihrisko Apollo	3:03	170	Boxscore

==== Final ====
Date	Local time	Road team	Score	Home team	Inn.	Venue	Game duration	Attendance	Boxscore
July 3, 2021	14:00	Slovakia	12–2	Ireland	7	Baseballové ihrisko Apollo	2:05	320	Boxscore

=== Grope Belgrade ===
Grope Belgrade took place at the Ada Ciganlija Baseball Field in Belgrade, Serbia, on July 1 to 4, 2021. Ukraine defeated Serbia to qualify for the European Championship.

==== Round robin ====
Pos	Team	Pld	W	L	RF	RA	PCT	GB	Qualification
1	Ukraine	3	2	1	20	8	.667	—	Final
2	Serbia (H)	3	2	1	23	6	.667	—	Final
3	Bulgaria	3	2	1	23	12	.667	—	
4	Estonia	3	0	3	3	43	.000	2	

Source: WBSC Europe
(H) Hosts

Date	Local time	Road team	Score	Home team	Inn.	Venue	Game duration	Attendance	Boxscore
July 1, 2021	11:00	Estonia	1–11	Ukraine	7	Ada Ciganlija Baseball Field	1:42	50	Boxscore
July 1, 2021	16:00	Bulgaria	0–7	Serbia		Ada Ciganlija Baseball Field	2:20	75	Boxscore
July 2, 2021	11:00	Ukraine	3–6	Bulgaria		Ada Ciganlija Baseball Field	2:16	30	Boxscore
July 2, 2021	16:00	Serbia	15–0	Estonia	6	Ada Ciganlija Baseball Field	2:13	40	Boxscore
July 3, 2021	11:00	Estonia	2–17	Bulgaria	6	Ada Ciganlija Baseball Field	2:07	30	Boxscore
July 3, 2021	16:00	Serbia	1–6	Ukraine		Ada Ciganlija Baseball Field	2:42	100	Boxscore

==== Final ====
Date	Local time	Road team	Score	Home team	Inn.	Venue	Game duration	Attendance	Boxscore
July 4, 2021	13:00	Serbia	5–9	Ukraine		Ada Ciganlija Baseball Field	2:20	150	Boxscore

== Qualified teams ==
Team	Qualification method	App	First	Last	Streak	Best placement
Netherlands	1st in 2019	33rd	1956	2019	26	Champions (twentythree times, last in 2019)
Italy	2nd in 2019	35th	1954	2019	26	Champions (ten times, last in 2012)
Spain	3rd in 2019	34th	1954	2019	19	Champions (1955)
Israel	4th in 2019	2nd	2019	2019	2	Fourth place (2019)
Czech Republic	5th in 2019	12th	1997	2019	12	Fourth place (2014)
Germany	6th in 2019	27th	1954	2019	14	Runners-up (1957)
Belgium	7th in 2019	30th	1954	2019	6	Champions (1967)
France	8th in 2019	26th	1955	2019	17	Third place (1999)
Great Britain	9th in 2019	16th	1967	2019	12	Runners-up (1967, 2007)
Austria	10th in 2019	3rd	2007	2019	2	10th place (2019)
Croatia	11th in 2019	11th	1999	2019	11	Eighth place (2001, 2007)
Sweden	12th in 2019	31st	1960	2019	31	Third place (1981, 1993)
Greece	Grope Utena Winner	7th	2003	2016	1	Runners-up (2003)
Russia	Grope Moscow Winner	12th	1993	2016	1	Runners-up (2001)
Slovakia	Group Bratislava winner	1st	―	―	1	Debut
Ukraine	Group Belgrade winner	7th	1995	2010	1	ninth place (1995, 2007)
