= 2010 European Baseball Championship – Qualification =

Qualification for 2010 European Baseball Championship
Tournament details
- Countries: Croatia; Czech Republic; Slovakia; Belgium; Portugal
- Dates: 7 – 12 July 2008; 9 – 12 July 2008
- Teams: 23

The qualification for the 2010 European Baseball Championship was held from July 7–12, 2008 in Croatia, Czech Republic and Slovakia, and July 9–12, 2008 in Belgium and Portugal. 23 nations contested to qualify for 5 spots available among the 7 other sides already qualified. In the end, Belgium, Croatia, Czech Republic, Greece and Ukraine qualified to compete in the 2010 competition, to be placed with the 7 already qualified teams from the 2007 competition. These are, France, Germany, Great Britain, Italy, Netherlands, Spain and Sweden.

== Qualifier Pool 1 ==
=== Group stage ===
Qualified for the final
Did not qualify for the final

#	Team	Games	Wins	Losses	Tiebreaker
1	Romania	4	4	0	–
2	Ukraine	4	3	1	–
3	Slovakia	4	2	2	–
4	Hungary	4	1	3	–
5	Finland	4	0	4	–

July 7, 2008	Finland	0 – 8	Romania	Trnava, Slovakia; Attendance: 200
July 7, 2008		Boxscore		Trnava, Slovakia; Attendance: 200

July 7, 2008	Slovakia	1 – 4 (F/7)	Ukraine	Trnava, Slovakia; Attendance: 500
July 7, 2008		Boxscore		Trnava, Slovakia; Attendance: 500

July 8, 2008	Hungary	0 – 5	Ukraine	Trnava, Slovakia; Attendance: 150
July 8, 2008		Boxscore		Trnava, Slovakia; Attendance: 150

July 8, 2008	Romania	8 – 5	Slovakia	Trnava, Slovakia; Attendance: 400
July 8, 2008		Boxscore		Trnava, Slovakia; Attendance: 400

July 9, 2008	Ukraine	0 – 1 (F/10)	Romania	Trnava, Slovakia; Attendance: 150
July 9, 2008		Boxscore		Trnava, Slovakia; Attendance: 150

July 9, 2008	Finland	0 – 10 (F/7)	Hungary	Trnava, Slovakia; Attendance: 150
July 9, 2008		Boxscore		Trnava, Slovakia; Attendance: 150

July 10, 2008	Ukraine	13 – 3 (F/7)	Finland	Trnava, Slovakia; Attendance: 100
July 10, 2008		Boxscore		Trnava, Slovakia; Attendance: 100

July 10, 2008	Hungary	1 – 12 (F/8)	Slovakia	Trnava, Slovakia; Attendance: 400
July 10, 2008		Boxscore		Trnava, Slovakia; Attendance: 400

July 11, 2008	Romania	3 – 2	Hungary	Trnava, Slovakia; Attendance: 150
July 11, 2008		Boxscore		Trnava, Slovakia; Attendance: 150

July 11, 2008	Slovakia	10 – 0 (F/7)	Finland	Trnava, Slovakia; Attendance: 360
July 11, 2008		Boxscore		Trnava, Slovakia; Attendance: 360

=== Final (best of 3) ===
July 12, 2008	Romania	1 – 8	Ukraine	Trnava, Slovakia; Attendance: 250
July 12, 2008		Boxscore		Trnava, Slovakia; Attendance: 250

July 12, 2008	Ukraine	16 – 4 (F/7)	Romania	Trnava, Slovakia; Attendance: 0
July 12, 2008		Boxscore		Trnava, Slovakia; Attendance: 0

== Qualifier Pool 2 ==
=== Group stage ===
Qualified for the final
Did not qualify for the final

#	Team	Games	Wins	Losses	Tiebreaker
1	Czech Republic	4	4	0	–
2	Slovenia	4	2	2	2.38 RA/9
3	Poland	4	2	2	5.52 RA/9
4	Belarus	4	2	2	8.44 RA/9
5	Latvia	4	0	4	–

July 7, 2008	Latvia	0 – 17 (F/7)	Slovenia	Prague, Czech Republic; Attendance: 500
July 7, 2008		Boxscore		Prague, Czech Republic; Attendance: 500

July 7, 2008	Belarus	0 – 10 (F/7)	Czech Republic	Prague, Czech Republic; Attendance: 200
July 7, 2008		Boxscore		Prague, Czech Republic; Attendance: 200

July 8, 2008	Slovenia	11 – 3	Belarus	Prague, Czech Republic; Attendance: 250
July 8, 2008		Boxscore		Prague, Czech Republic; Attendance: 250

July 8, 2008	Poland	1 – 12 (F/7)	Czech Republic	Prague, Czech Republic; Attendance: 400
July 8, 2008		Boxscore		Prague, Czech Republic; Attendance: 400

July 9, 2008	Latvia	1 – 24 (F/6)	Poland	Prague, Czech Republic; Attendance: 100
July 9, 2008		Boxscore		Prague, Czech Republic; Attendance: 100

July 9, 2008	Czech Republic	3 – 2 (F/11)	Slovenia	Prague, Czech Republic; Attendance: 400
July 9, 2008		Boxscore		Prague, Czech Republic; Attendance: 400

July 10, 2008	Czech Republic	22 – 2 (F/5)	Latvia	Prague, Czech Republic; Attendance: 100
July 10, 2008		Boxscore		Prague, Czech Republic; Attendance: 100

July 10, 2008	Poland	2 – 4	Belarus	Prague, Czech Republic; Attendance: 300
July 10, 2008		Boxscore		Prague, Czech Republic; Attendance: 300

July 11, 2008	Belarus	17 – 7 (F/8)	Latvia	Prague, Czech Republic; Attendance: 200
July 11, 2008		Boxscore		Prague, Czech Republic; Attendance: 200

July 11, 2008	Slovenia	2 – 3	Poland	Prague, Czech Republic; Attendance: 500
July 11, 2008		Boxscore		Prague, Czech Republic; Attendance: 500

=== Final (best of 3) ===
July 12, 2008	Czech Republic	8 – 0	Slovenia	Prague, Czech Republic; Attendance: 500
July 12, 2008		Boxscore		Prague, Czech Republic; Attendance: 500

== Qualifier Pool 3 ==
=== Group stage ===
Qualified for the final
Did not qualify for the final

#	Team	Games	Wins	Losses	Tiebreaker
1	Croatia	4	4	0	–
2	Lithuania	4	2	2	4.86 RA/9
3	Israel	4	2	2	6.75 RA/9
4	Bulgaria	4	2	2	9.00 RA/9
5	Serbia	4	0	4	–

July 7, 2008	Bulgaria	11 – 8	Israel	Karlovac, Croatia; Attendance: 45
July 7, 2008		Boxscore		Karlovac, Croatia; Attendance: 45

July 7, 2008	Croatia	18 – 1 (F/7)	Serbia	Karlovac, Croatia; Attendance: 200
July 7, 2008		Boxscore		Karlovac, Croatia; Attendance: 200

July 8, 2008	Lithuania	7 – 2	Serbia	Karlovac, Croatia; Attendance: 50
July 8, 2008		Boxscore		Karlovac, Croatia; Attendance: 50

July 8, 2008	Israel	1 – 6	Croatia	Karlovac, Croatia; Attendance: 200
July 8, 2008		Boxscore		Karlovac, Croatia; Attendance: 200

July 9, 2008	Bulgaria	0 – 8	Lithuania	Karlovac, Croatia; Attendance: 60
July 9, 2008		Boxscore		Karlovac, Croatia; Attendance: 60

July 9, 2008	Serbia	9 – 11	Israel	Karlovac, Croatia; Attendance: 110
July 9, 2008		Boxscore		Karlovac, Croatia; Attendance: 110

July 10, 2008	Serbia	10 – 22 (F/7)	Bulgaria	Karlovac, Croatia; Attendance: 30
July 10, 2008		Boxscore		Karlovac, Croatia; Attendance: 30

July 10, 2008	Lithuania	3 – 8	Croatia	Karlovac, Croatia; Attendance: 270
July 10, 2008		Boxscore		Karlovac, Croatia; Attendance: 270

July 11, 2008	Israel	2 – 1 (F/10)	Lithuania	Karlovac, Croatia; Attendance: 30
July 11, 2008		Boxscore		Karlovac, Croatia; Attendance: 30

July 11, 2008	Croatia	7 – 6	Bulgaria	Karlovac, Croatia; Attendance: 110
July 11, 2008		Boxscore		Karlovac, Croatia; Attendance: 110

=== Final (best of 3) ===
July 12, 2008	Croatia	5 – 4	Lithuania	Karlovac, Croatia; Attendance: 120
July 12, 2008		Boxscore		Karlovac, Croatia; Attendance: 120

== Qualifier Pool 4 ==
=== Group stage ===
Qualified for the final
Did not qualify for the final

#	Team	Games	Wins	Losses	Tiebreaker
1	Greece	3	3	0	–
2	Russia	3	2	1	–
3	Portugal	3	1	2	–
4	Ireland	3	0	3	–

July 9, 2008	Greece	5 – 3	Russia	Abrantes, Portugal; Attendance: 150
July 9, 2008		Boxscore		Abrantes, Portugal; Attendance: 150

July 9, 2008	Ireland	8 – 11	Portugal	Abrantes, Portugal; Attendance: 200
July 9, 2008		Boxscore		Abrantes, Portugal; Attendance: 200

July 10, 2008	Russia	5 – 4 (F/10)	Ireland	Abrantes, Portugal; Attendance: 195
July 10, 2008		Boxscore		Abrantes, Portugal; Attendance: 195

July 10, 2008	Portugal	3 – 11	Greece	Abrantes, Portugal; Attendance: 250
July 10, 2008		Boxscore		Abrantes, Portugal; Attendance: 250

July 11, 2008	Ireland	1 – 5	Greece	Abrantes, Portugal; Attendance: 135
July 11, 2008		Boxscore		Abrantes, Portugal; Attendance: 135

July 11, 2008	Russia	10 – 0 (F/8)	Portugal	Abrantes, Portugal; Attendance: 256
July 11, 2008		Boxscore		Abrantes, Portugal; Attendance: 256

=== Final (best of 3) ===
July 12, 2008	Greece	5 – 0	Russia	Abrantes, Portugal; Attendance: 213
July 12, 2008		Boxscore		Abrantes, Portugal; Attendance: 213

== Qualifier Pool 5 ==
=== Group stage ===
Qualified for the final
Did not qualify for the final

#	Team	Games	Wins	Losses	Tiebreaker
1	Belgium	3	3	0	–
2	Austria	3	2	1	–
3	Switzerland	3	1	2	–
4	Malta	3	0	3	–

July 9, 2008	Switzerland	2 – 10	Austria	Antwerp, Belgium; Attendance: 0
July 9, 2008		Boxscore		Antwerp, Belgium; Attendance: 0

July 10, 2008	Malta	1 – 15 (F/7)	Belgium	Antwerp, Belgium; Attendance: 0
July 10, 2008		Boxscore		Antwerp, Belgium; Attendance: 0

July 10, 2008	Austria	30 – 4 (F/5)	Malta	Antwerp, Belgium; Attendance: 0
July 10, 2008		Boxscore		Antwerp, Belgium; Attendance: 0

July 11, 2008	Belgium	12 – 5	Switzerland	Antwerp, Belgium; Attendance: 0
July 11, 2008		Boxscore		Antwerp, Belgium; Attendance: 0

July 11, 2008	Switzerland	16 – 6 (F/8)	Malta	Antwerp, Belgium; Attendance: 0
July 11, 2008		Boxscore		Antwerp, Belgium; Attendance: 0

July 11, 2008	Belgium	5 – 2	Austria	Antwerp, Belgium; Attendance: 200
July 11, 2008		Boxscore		Antwerp, Belgium; Attendance: 200

=== 3rd place ===
July 12, 2008	Switzerland	12 – 6	Malta	Antwerp, Belgium; Attendance: 0
July 12, 2008		Boxscore		Antwerp, Belgium; Attendance: 0

=== Final (best of 3) ===
July 12, 2008	Belgium	3 – 1	Austria	Antwerp, Belgium; Attendance: 0
July 12, 2008		Boxscore		Antwerp, Belgium; Attendance: 0
