= 2025 European Baseball Championship – Qualification =

2025 European Baseball Championship Qualifying
Tournament details
- Countries: Serbia; Poland; Ireland
- Dates: July 22 – 28 2024
- Teams: 13

Tournament statistics
- Games played: 25

The 2025 European Baseball Championship Qualifying was baseball tournament held from July 22 to 28, 2024, to determine the three additional countries that would qualify for the 2025 European Baseball Championship, in addition to the top 13 countries that automatically qualified in the 2023 European Baseball Championship. The qualifiers were held in Belgrade, Serbia; Kutno, Poland; and Ashbourne, Ireland.

== Groups ==
=== Grope Serbia ===
Grope Serbia took place at the Ada Ciganlija Baseball Field in Belgrade, Serbia, on July 22 to 27, 2024. Hungary defeated Serbia to qualify for the European Championship.

==== Round robin ====
Pos	Team	Pld	W	L	RF	RA	PCT	GB	Qualification
1	Hungary	4	4	0	57	5	1.000	—	Final
2	Serbia (H)	4	3	1	29	19	.750	1	Final
3	Slovenia	4	2	2	19	25	.500	2	
4	Slovakia	4	1	3	20	24	.250	3	
5	Turkey	4	0	4	2	54	.000	4	

Source: WBSC Europe
(H) Hosts

Date	Local time	Road team	Score	Home team	Inn.	Venue	Game duration	Attendance	Boxscore
Jul 22, 2024	11:00	Slovenia	11–1	Turkey	F/8	Ada Ciganlija Baseball Field	2:54	50	Boxscore
Jul 22, 2024	16:00	Serbia	2–12	Hungary	F/7	Ada Ciganlija Baseball Field	2:05	152	Boxscore
Jul 23, 2024	11:00	Slovenia	4–2	Slovakia		Ada Ciganlija Baseball Field	2:25	108	Boxscore
Jul 23, 2024	16:00	Turkey	0–15	Serbia	F/5	Ada Ciganlija Baseball Field	1:43	75	Boxscore
Jul 24, 2024	11:00	Slovakia	1–13	Hungary	F/7	Ada Ciganlija Baseball Field	1:52	60	Boxscore
Jul 24, 2024	16:00	Serbia	6–2	Slovenia		Ada Ciganlija Baseball Field	2:37	97	Boxscore
Jul 25, 2024	11:00	Hungary	16–2	Slovenia	F/7	Ada Ciganlija Baseball Field	2:33	80	Boxscore
Jul 25, 2024	16:00	Turkey	1–12	Slovakia	F/7	Ada Ciganlija Baseball Field	2:06	42	Boxscore
Jul 26, 2024	11:00	Hungary	16–0	Turkey	F/6	Ada Ciganlija Baseball Field	2:01	70	Boxscore
Jul 26, 2024	16:00	Slovakia	5–6	Serbia		Ada Ciganlija Baseball Field	2:46	257	Boxscore

==== Final ====
Date	Local time	Road team	Score	Home team	Inn.	Venue	Game duration	Attendance	Boxscore
Jul 27, 2024	14:00	Serbia	1–11	Hungary	F/8	Ada Ciganlija Baseball Field	2:33	317	Boxscore

=== Grope Poland ===
Grope Poland took place at the Little League EMEA Training Center in Kutno, Poland, on July 24 to 27, 2024. Lithuania defeated Poland to qualify for the European Championship.

==== Round robin ====
Pos	Team	Pld	W	L	RF	RA	PCT	GB	Qualification
1	Lithuania	3	3	0	37	10	1.000	—	Final
2	Poland (H)	3	2	1	27	16	.667	1	Final
3	Romania	3	1	2	18	32	.333	2	
4	Finland	3	0	3	6	30	.000	3	

Source: WBSC Europe
(H) Hosts

Date	Local time	Road team	Score	Home team	Inn.	Venue	Game duration	Attendance	Boxscore
Jul 24, 2024	12:00	Romania	9–0	Finland		Little League EMEA Training Center	2:34	70	Boxscore
Jul 24, 2024	18:00	Poland	3–8	Lithuania		Little League EMEA Training Center	2:53	150	Boxscore
Jul 25, 2024	12:00	Lithuania	15–5	Romania	F/7	Little League EMEA Training Center	2:10	50	Boxscore
Jul 25, 2024	18:00	Finland	4–7	Poland		Little League EMEA Training Center	2:35	213	Boxscore
Jul 26, 2024	12:00	Finland	2–14	Lithuania	F/7	Little League EMEA Training Center	2:31	25	Boxscore
Jul 26, 2024	18:00	Poland	17–4	Romania		Little League EMEA Training Center	3:18	180	Boxscore

==== Final ====
Date	Local time	Road team	Score	Home team	Inn.	Venue	Game duration	Attendance	Boxscore
Jul 27, 2024	14:00	Poland	9–10	Lithuania		Little League EMEA Training Center	2:53		Boxscore

=== Grope Ireland ===
Grope Ireland took place at the International Baseball Centre of Ashbourne in Ashbourne, Ireland, on July 25 to 28, 2024. Austria defeated Ireland to qualify for the European Championship.

==== Round robin ====
Pos	Team	Pld	W	L	RF	RA	PCT	GB	Qualification
1	Ireland (H)	3	2	1	8	8	.667 (Note: Head-to-head result: Ireland 2–0 Austria)	—	Final
2	Austria	3	2	1	33	8	.667	—	Final
3	Norway	3	1	2	19	28	.333 (Note: Head-to-head result: Norway 14–3 Bulgaria)	1	
4	Bulgaria	3	1	2	12	28	.333	1	

Source: WBSC Europe
(H) Hosts
Notes:

Date	Local time	Road team	Score	Home team	Inn.	Venue	Game duration	Attendance	Boxscore
Jul 25, 2024	12:30	Norway	14–3	Bulgaria	F/8	International Baseball Centre of Ashbourne		78	Boxscore
Jul 25, 2024	17:30	Ireland	2–0	Austria		International Baseball Centre of Ashbourne	2:33	200	Boxscore
Jul 26, 2024	12:30	Austria	19–2	Norway	F/7	International Baseball Centre of Ashbourne	2:42	48	Boxscore
Jul 26, 2024	17:30	Bulgaria	5–0	Ireland		International Baseball Centre of Ashbourne	2:32	160	Boxscore
Jul 27, 2024	11:00	Bulgaria	4–14	Austria	F/8	International Baseball Centre of Ashbourne	2:58	40	Boxscore
Jul 27, 2024	16:00	Ireland	6–3	Norway	F/10	International Baseball Centre of Ashbourne	3:28	400	Boxscore

==== Final ====
Date	Local time	Road team	Score	Home team	Inn.	Venue	Game duration	Attendance	Boxscore
Jul 28, 2024	15:00	Austria	14–3	Ireland	F/8	International Baseball Centre of Ashbourne	3:00	420	Boxscore

== Qualified teams ==
Team	Qualification method	App	First	Last	Streak	Best placement
Spain	1st in 2023	36th	1954	2023	21	Champions (1955, 2023)
Great Britain	2nd in 2023	18th	1967	2023	14	Runners-up (1967, 2007, 2023)
Netherlands	3rd in 2023	35th	1956	2023	28	Champions (twentyfour times, last in 2021)
Germany	4th in 2023	29th	1954	2023	16	Runners-up (1957)
Czech Republic	5th in 2023	14th	1997	2023	14	Fourth place(2014)
Israel	6th in 2023	4th	2019	2023	4	Runners-up (2021)
France	7th in 2023	28th	1955	2023	19	Third place (1999)
Sweden	8th in 2023	33rd	1960	2023	33	Third place (1981, 1993)
Italy	9th in 2023	37th	1954	2023	28	Champions (ten times, last in 2012)
Croatia	10th in 2023	13th	1999	2023	13	Seventh place (2021)
Belgium	11th in 2023	32nd	1954	2023	8	Champions (1967)
Switzerland	12th in 2023	2nd	2023	2023	2	12th place (2023)
Greece	13th in 2023	9th	2003	2023	3	Runners-up (2003)
Austria	Group Ireland winner	5th	2007	2023	4	10th place (2019)
Hungary	Group Serbia winner	2nd	2023	2023	2	16th place (2023)
Lithuania	Group Poland winner	1st	―	―	1	Debut
