= Israel at the European Baseball Championship =

This is a record of Israel's results at the European Baseball Championship. Israel came in second in the 2021 European Baseball Championship.

== Honors ==
During the 2016 C-Level qualifier, Dean Kremer was named the Euros’ Most Valuable Pitcher and Simon Rosenbaum was named MVP. During the 2016 B-Level qualifier, Kremer once again won the Most Valuable Pitcher award.

Israel led teams at the 2016 competition in almost every statistic possible during the C-Level qualifiers. They led in hitting with a .309 average, .450 on base percentage, .509 slugging percentage. They also were the leaders in runs with 53, home runs with 9 and hit by pitch with 20. In addition to hitting they led in ERA with 1.05, strikeouts with an average of 11.5 per nine innings, opponents batting average with .140 and fielding percentage of .973. Israel was tied for stolen bases with 23, which Romania led with 26. The only other statistics Israel did not lead in were walks and doubles.

== Record ==
	European Baseball Championship record							Qualification record				
Year	Host(s)	Round	Position	W	L	RS	RA	Host	W	L	RS	RA
2010	Did not qualify							Croatia	2	2	22	27
2012	Did not qualify							Israel	3	2	39	16
2014	Did not enter							Did not enter				
2016	Did not qualify							Slovenia, Austria	8	2	97	29
2019	Germany	Semifinals	4th	5	3	50	48	Serbia, Bulgaria, Lithuania	11	3	129	48
2021	Italy	Final	2nd place, silver medalist(s)	5	1	41	21					
2023	Czech Republic	Quarter-Finals	6th	3	3	34	32					
2025	Netherlands	Quarter-Finals	7th	3	4	33	38					

=== Record by team ===
Team	Main tournament					Qualifier				
Team	GP	W	L	RF	RA	GP	W	L	RF	RA
Bulgaria						3	2	1	26	13
Croatia	1	1	0	11	5	1	0	1	1	6
Serbia						3	3	0	37	10
Lithuania						5	4	1	47	12
Georgia						1	1	0	11	1
Great Britain	3	2	1	19	24	3	1	2	15	13
Romania						1	1	0	8	3
Finland						1	1	0	13	1
Slovenia						2	2	0	23	0
Latvia						1	1	0	9	3
Belarus						1	1	0	13	1
Poland						1	1	0	8	6
Austria						3	1	2	15	17
Sweden	2	2	0	10	7	1	0	1	8	9
Switzerland	2	2	0	23	2	1	1	0	10	0
Belgium	1	1	0	11	8					
Greece						2	1	1	15	9
Russia	1	1	0	2	1	2	2	0	18	15
Ireland						1	1	0	10	3
Germany	3	1	2	13	14					
Czech Republic	4	2	2	13	12					
Netherlands	4	0	4	11	43					
France	3	3	0	26	6					
Italy	2	1	1	17	12					
Spain	1	0	1	11	16					
Total	27	16	11	167	150	33	24	9	287	122

== 2010 European Baseball Championship - Qualifier Pool 3 ==
Israel competed in the qualification for the 2010 European Baseball Championship, in July 2008. Israel went 2-2 and finished in 3rd place, based on the tiebreaker stat of runs against per 9 innings. Israel lost their first two games, against Bulgaria and Croatia, before coming back to win their final two games, against Serbia and Lithuania.

Standings

#	Team	Games	Wins	Losses	Tiebreaker
1	Croatia	4	4	0	–
2	Lithuania	4	2	2	4.86 RA/9
3	Israel	4	2	2	6.75 RA/9
4	Bulgaria	4	2	2	9.00 RA/9
5	Serbia	4	0	4	–

Qualified for the final
Did not qualify for the final

2010 Games

July 7, 2008	Bulgaria	11 – 8	Israel	Karlovac, Croatia; Attendance: 45
July 7, 2008		Boxscore		Karlovac, Croatia; Attendance: 45

July 8, 2008	Israel	1 – 6	Croatia	Karlovac, Croatia; Attendance: 200
July 8, 2008		Boxscore		Karlovac, Croatia; Attendance: 200

July 9, 2008	Serbia	9 – 11	Israel	Karlovac, Croatia; Attendance: 110
July 9, 2008		Boxscore		Karlovac, Croatia; Attendance: 110

July 11, 2008	Israel	2 – 1 (F/10)	Lithuania	Karlovac, Croatia; Attendance: 30
July 11, 2008		Boxscore		Karlovac, Croatia; Attendance: 30

== 2012 European Baseball Championship - Pool Tel Aviv ==
Israel competed in the qualification for the 2012 European Baseball Championship. In addition to competing, Israel hosted one of the qualification pools from July 26–29, 2011. Israel was eliminated from the tournament after going 2-1, finishing in second place behind Great Britain who went 3-0. Israel won their first game against Georgia, lost their second game against Great Britain, before coming back to beat Lithuania in their final game. Israel went on to compete in the home/away finals against Great Britain, where they won the first game but lost the second, with Great Britain advancing to the main tournament.

Going into the round, Great Britain was expected to come win, being ranked 21st, followed by Lithuania at 48 and Israel at 57.

2012 standings

Teams	W	L	Pct.	GB	R	RA
Great Britain	3	0	1.000	—	30	16
Israel	2	1	.667	1	30	11
Lithuania	1	2	.333	2	19	28
Georgia	0	3	.000	3	9	33

2012 games

July 26, 2011	Israel	11 – 1 (F/7)	Georgia	Tel Aviv, Israel; Attendance: 857
July 26, 2011		Boxscore		Tel Aviv, Israel; Attendance: 857

July 27, 2011	Great Britain	8 – 6	Israel	Tel Aviv, Israel; Attendance: 650
July 27, 2011		Boxscore		Tel Aviv, Israel; Attendance: 650

July 28, 2011	Lithuania	2 – 13 (F/8)	Israel	Tel Aviv, Israel; Attendance: 800
July 28, 2011		Boxscore		Tel Aviv, Israel; Attendance: 800

2012 finals

July 29, 2011	Great Britain	0 – 7	Israel	Tel Aviv, Israel; Attendance: 472
July 29, 2011		Boxscore		Tel Aviv, Israel; Attendance: 472

July 29, 2011	Israel	2 – 5	Great Britain	Tel Aviv, Israel; Attendance: 320
July 29, 2011		Boxscore		Tel Aviv, Israel; Attendance: 320

== 2016 European Baseball Championship ==
Israel competed in the qualification for the 2016 European Baseball Championship.

During the C-Level qualifier, Dean Kremer was named the Euros’ Most Valuable Pitcher. During the two games he pitched, he pitched 13 innings, giving up only 6 hits, no runs, one walk, and struck out 20.

Simon Rosenbaum was named MVP after hitting .529, along with four homeruns, giving him a 1.294 slugging percentage, in addition to scoring ten runs, collecting 10 RBIs and had three stolen bases.

Israel led teams at competition in almost every statistic possible during the C-Level qualifiers. They led in hitting with a .309 average, .450 on base percentage, .509 slugging percentage. They also were the leaders in runs with 53, home runs with 9 and hit by pitch with 20. In addition to hitting they led in ERA with 1.05, strikeouts with an average of 11.5 per nine innings, opponents batting average with .140 and fielding percentage of .973. Israel was tied for stolen bases with 23, which Romania led with 26. The only other statistics Israel did not lead in were walks and doubles.

=== 2016 C-Level qualification ===
At the 2016 European Baseball Championship Israel entered the qualification at the C-Level. After finishing in first place during the Group B round, Israel moved on to the C-Level finals. Israel was placed in Group B for the C-Level qualifier, where they won all three games they played, against Slovenia, Finland and Latvia, outscoring their competitors 31-4. Advancing to the C-Level semifinals, Israel faced Romania who they beat 8-3. In the finals, Israel beat Slovenia 14-0. During the C-Level finals stage, the top two teams move on to the B-Level qualification. As the first-place finisher, Israel moved on to B-Level qualification.

Group B standings

Teams	W	L	Pct.	GB
Israel	3	0	1.000	0
Slovenia	2	1	.667	1
Finland	1	2	.333	2
Latvia	0	3	.000	3

Qualified for Final Stage
Did not qualify fot Final Stage

Group B games

July 29, 2014	Finland	1 – 13	Israel	Attendance: 60
July 29, 2014		Boxscore		Attendance: 60

July 30, 2014	Israel	9 – 0	Slovenia	Attendance: 125
July 30, 2014		Boxscore		Attendance: 125

July 31, 2014	Israel	9 – 3	Latvia	Attendance: 32
July 31, 2014		Boxscore		Attendance: 32

Final stage standings

#	Teams
1	Israel
2	Slovenia
3	Romania
4	Ireland
5	Hungary
6	Finland
7	Latvia
8	Norway

Qualified for B-level Tournament.

C-Level semifinals

August 1, 2014	Israel	8 – 3	Romania	Ljubljana, Slovenia; Attendance: 78
August 1, 2014		Boxscore		Ljubljana, Slovenia; Attendance: 78

C-Level final

August 2, 2014	Israel	14 – 0	Slovenia	Ljubljana, Slovenia; Attendance: 257
August 2, 2014		Boxscore		Ljubljana, Slovenia; Attendance: 257

=== 2016 B-level qualifier ===
After qualifying for the B-Level qualifier after finishing in first place during the C-Level qualifier, Israel competed in the Group A. The top team from each of the two groups would move on to the tournament. With Israel placing third in their group, they were eliminated. Israel started the round with victories over Belarus, Poland and Austria, before losing to Lithuania and Sweden. Despite outscoring their opponents 44-26, Israel was eliminated from the tournament, as Sweden and Austria went 4-1, leaving Israel one game back from advancing.

Group A standings

Teams	W	L	Pct.	GB
Sweden	4	1	.800	0
Austria	4	1	.800	0
Israel	3	2	.600	1
Lithuania	2	3	.500	2
Belarus	1	4	.200	3
Poland	1	4	.200	3

Group A games

July 27, 2015	Israel	13 – 1	Belarus	Vienna; Attendance: 50
July 27, 2015		Boxscore		Vienna; Attendance: 50

July 28, 2015	Poland	6 – 8	Israel	Vienna; Attendance: 130
July 28, 2015		Boxscore		Vienna; Attendance: 130

July 29, 2015	Israel	10 – 1	Austria	Vienna; Attendance: 780
July 29, 2015		Boxscore		Vienna; Attendance: 780

July 30, 2015	Israel	5 – 7	Lithuania	Vienna; Attendance: 250
July 30, 2015		Boxscore		Vienna; Attendance: 250

July 31, 2015	Sweden	9 – 8	Israel	Vienna; Attendance: 500
July 31, 2015		Boxscore		Vienna; Attendance: 500

2016 roster

##	Name	Position	B/T	CI	DOB
6	Dean Kremer	P/OF	R/R	SR	07/01/1996
8	Oren Gal	IF	R/R	SR	19/07/1987
10	Jonathan Isaac	OF	R/R	SR	10/07/1989
12	Josh Weiss	OF	R/R	SR	26/12/1981
13	Tal Erel	P/C	R/R	SR	16/06/1996
15	David Weiss	OF	R/R	SR	12/09/1994
19	Aric Weinberg	OF	L/R	SR	18/12/1985
20	Yuli Tzippin	P/OF	R/R	SR	02/08/1993
21	Ophir Katz	C/OF	R/R	SR	03/04/1987
22	Amit Kurz	C/IF	R/R	SR	20/08/1988
23	Orr Gottlieb	P/OF	R/R	SR	27/09/1981
25	Yotam Ben-Amram	P/OF	R/R	SR	25/07/1997
28	Alon Leichman	P	R/R	SR	29/05/1989
32	Dan Rothem	P/IF	R/R	SR	03/12/1976
33	Eitan Maoz	C	L/R	SR	21/12/1989
35/7	Nate Fish	IF	R/R	SR	02/01/1980
36	Shlomo Lipetz	P	R/R	SR	11/02/1979
39	Simon Rosembaum	P/IF	R/R	SR	28/12/1993
37	Richard Kania	Manager			
	Peter Kurz	General Manager			
40	Jake Rabinowitz	Coach			
4	Zuzana Srejberova	Coach			

== 2019 European Baseball Championship ==
Based on Team Israel's performance in the 2016 competition, Israel did not need to compete in the C-Level qualifier and competed instead in the B-Level qualifier in 2017. Israel played in Pool 1, in Belgrade, Serbia, from 24 to 29 July 2018. During the tournament, Israel played Switzerland, Bulgaria, Austria, Greece, and Serbia. They went 3-2, which was enough to qualify them for the group championship game against Austria, which they lost 12-2.

They were then sent to another group stage with teams from the C stage and other teams that did not yet qualify. They were assigned to Pool B, which featured 12 teams competing in two groups of 6. The two group winners faced off in a playoff for the last qualifying spot for the 2019 European Championship. In their pool, Team Israel competed against Russia, Ireland, Serbia, Bulgaria, and Greece.

The team played in the 2019 European Baseball Championship - B-Pool in early July 2019 in Blagoevgrad, Bulgaria, winning all of five of its games and advancing to the playoffs against Team Lithuania in the 2019 Playoff Series at the end of July 2019 which it won and thus qualified for the last qualifying spot for the 2019 European Baseball Championship.

In preparation for Baseball at the 2020 Summer Olympics, 10 American baseball players made Aliyah in 2018 in order to qualify under the citizenship requirement for the 2019 European Baseball Championships and the Olympics. The players were Corey Baker, Gabe Cramer, Blake Gailen, Joey Wagman, Alex Katz, Eric Brodkowitz, Jonathan de Marte, Jon Moscot, Jeremy Wolf (who lives in Tel Aviv), and Zack Weiss. They were followed in 2019 by Danny Valencia, Ty Kelly, Nick Rickles, Ben Wanger, and Jeremy Bleich.

In Round 1 of the 2019 European Baseball Championship, Israel went 4-1 (defeating the Czech Republic, Sweden, Germany, and Great Britain while losing to the Netherlands). The team thereby advanced to the Championship's eight-team playoffs, with Mitch Glasser leading all Championship batters in runs with 7, and Blake Gailen tied with Germany's Marco Cardoso for the lead in hits, with 8. In the Championship playoffs, Israel defeated Team France in the quarterfinals, lost to Team Italy in the semi-finals, and came in fourth.

Qualified for Final
Did not qualify for Final

#	Teams	W	L
1	Israel	5	0
2	Russia	4	1
3	Greece	3	2
4	Serbia	2	3
5	Ireland	1	4
6	Bulgaria	0	5

July 1, 2019; 10:00	Greece	7–14	Israel	Blagoevgrad; Attendance: 75
July 1, 2019; 10:00		Boxscore		Blagoevgrad; Attendance: 75

July 1, 2019; 13:30	Serbia	17–5 (7)	Ireland	Blagoevgrad; Attendance: 60
July 1, 2019; 13:30		Boxscore		Blagoevgrad; Attendance: 60

July 1, 2019; 17:30	Bulgaria	0–21 (5)	Russia	Blagoevgrad; Attendance: 52
July 1, 2019; 17:30		Boxscore		Blagoevgrad; Attendance: 52

July 2, 2019; 10:00	Israel	11–1 (8)	Serbia	Blagoevgrad; Attendance: 85
July 2, 2019; 10:00		Boxscore		Blagoevgrad; Attendance: 85

July 2, 2019; 13:30	Russia	14–1	Greece	Blagoevgrad; Attendance: 60
July 2, 2019; 13:30		Boxscore		Blagoevgrad; Attendance: 60

July 2, 2019; 17:30	Ireland	5–0	Bulgaria	Blagoevgrad; Attendance: 72
July 2, 2019; 17:30		Boxscore		Blagoevgrad; Attendance: 72

July 3, 2019; 10:00	Serbia	5–9	Greece	Blagoevgrad; Attendance: 68
July 3, 2019; 10:00		Boxscore		Blagoevgrad; Attendance: 68

July 3, 2019; 13:30	Russia	13–3 (7)	Ireland	Blagoevgrad; Attendance: 47
July 3, 2019; 13:30		Boxscore		Blagoevgrad; Attendance: 47

July 3, 2019; 17:30	Israel	8–0	Bulgaria	Blagoevgrad; Attendance: 50
July 3, 2019; 17:30		Boxscore		Blagoevgrad; Attendance: 50

July 4, 2019; 10:00	Greece	3-0	Ireland	Blagoevgrad; Attendance: 60
July 4, 2019; 10:00		Boxscore		Blagoevgrad; Attendance: 60

July 4, 2019; 13:30	Israel	13-12 (10)	Russia	Blagoevgrad; Attendance: 60
July 4, 2019; 13:30		Boxscore		Blagoevgrad; Attendance: 60

July 4, 2019; 17:30	Serbia	7-2	Bulgaria	Blagoevgrad; Attendance: 83
July 4, 2019; 17:30		Boxscore		Blagoevgrad; Attendance: 83

July 5, 2019; 10:00	Ireland	3-10 (7)	Israel	Blagoevgrad; Attendance: 42
July 5, 2019; 10:00		Boxscore		Blagoevgrad; Attendance: 42

July 5, 2019; 13:30	Russia	12-3	Serbia	Blagoevgrad; Attendance: 45
July 5, 2019; 13:30		Boxscore		Blagoevgrad; Attendance: 45

July 5, 2019; 17:30	Bulgaria	6-9	Greece	Blagoevgrad; Attendance: 86
July 5, 2019; 17:30		Boxscore		Blagoevgrad; Attendance: 86

=== B Pool Final ===
July 6, 2019; 10:00	Israel	5-3	Russia	Blagoevgrad; Attendance: 126
July 6, 2019; 10:00		Boxscore		Blagoevgrad; Attendance: 126

=== 2019 Playoff Series ===
Israel won the best-of-three playoff series, and thus qualified for the 2019 European Baseball Championship. The playoff host was Lithuania.

July 26, 2019	Lithuania	2-12	Israel	Utena; Attendance: 354

July 27, 2019	Israel	15-0	Lithuania	Utena

July 28, 2019	Lithuania	Israel	Utena

=== Pool A ===
Qualified for Quarterfinals
Qualified for Relegation Round

Teams	W	L	Pct.	GB	R	RA
Netherlands	4	1	.800	–	46	15
Israel	4	1	.800	–	25	23
Czech Republic	3	2	.600	1.0	32	25
Germany	2	3	.400	2.0	19	23
Great Britain	2	3	.400	2.0	23	28
Sweden	0	5	.000	4.0	14	45

=== Play-Offs ===
Quarter Finals:

September 13, 2019 11:00	Israel	8 – 2	France	Bonn 1, Bonn; Attendance: 200
September 13, 2019 11:00		Boxscore		Bonn 1, Bonn; Attendance: 200

== 2021 European Baseball Championship ==
=== Group stage ===
Pos	Team	Pld	W	L	RF	RA	RD	PCT	GB	Qualification
1	Israel	3	3	0	23	5	+18	1.000	—	Qualified for Quarterfinals
2	Great Britain	3	1	2	17	20	−3	.333	2	Qualified for Quarterfinals
3	Russia	3	1	2	12	13	−1	.333	2	Qualified for Relegation Round
4	France	3	1	2	7	21	−14	.333	2	Qualified for Relegation Round

12 September 2021	Russia	1–2 (10)	Israel	Paschetto municipal stadium, Turin
12 September 2021		Boxscore		Paschetto municipal stadium, Turin

13 September 2021	Israel	10–0	France	Giovanni Paolo II municipal sports facility, Avigliana
13 September 2021		Boxscore		Giovanni Paolo II municipal sports facility, Avigliana

14 September 2021	Great Britain	4–11	Israel	Stadio Valter Aluffi, Settimo Torinese
14 September 2021		Boxscore		Stadio Valter Aluffi, Settimo Torinese

=== Play-offs ===
==== Quarter-finals ====
16 September 2021; 20:30	Israel	3–2	Czech Republic	Giovanni Paolo II municipal sports facility, Avigliana
16 September 2021; 20:30		Boxscore		Giovanni Paolo II municipal sports facility, Avigliana

==== Semi-finals ====
17 September 2021; 20:30	Israel	11–5	Italy	Giovanni Paolo II municipal sports facility, Avigliana
17 September 2021; 20:30		Boxscore		Giovanni Paolo II municipal sports facility, Avigliana

==== Final ====
19 September 2021; 20:30	Israel	4–9	Netherlands	Paschetto municipal stadium, Turin
19 September 2021; 20:30		Boxscore		Paschetto municipal stadium, Turin

== See also ==
- Israel at the World Baseball Classic
