= 2019 European Baseball Championship – Qualification =

The qualification for the 2019 European Baseball Championship started on July 25, 2016, in Ljubljana, Slovenia and Miejska Górka, Poland. The tournament was originally planned for 2018, but was moved back a year to 2019 to serve as a qualification for the 2020 Olympiad.

== 2016 Pool C ==
Qualification for 2019 European Baseball Championship C-Pool
Tournament details
- Countries: Poland; Slovenia
- Dates: 25–30 July 2016
- Teams: 10

=== Miejska Górka Group ===
Qualified for Final
Did not qualify for Final

Teams	W	L
Poland	4	0
Romania	2	2
Estonia	2	2
Hungary	1	3
Georgia	1	3

==== Final ====
July 30, 2016	Poland	7–1	Romania	Miejska Górka, Poland; Attendance: 250
July 30, 2016		Boxscore		Miejska Górka, Poland; Attendance: 250

Qualified for B-level Tournament.

==== Final standings ====
#	Teams
1	Poland
2	Romania
3	Estonia
4	Hungary
5	Georgia

=== Ljubljana Group ===
Qualified for Final
Did not qualify for Final

Teams	W	L
Slovenia	3	1
Serbia	2	2
Ireland	2	2
Norway	2	2
Finland	1	3

==== Final ====
July 30, 2016	Slovenia	2–6	Serbia	Ljubljana, Slovenia; Attendance: 302
July 30, 2016		Boxscore		Ljubljana, Slovenia; Attendance: 302

Qualified for B-level Tournament.

==== Final standings ====
#	Teams
1	Serbia
2	Slovenia
3	Ireland
4	Norway
5	Finland

== 2017 Pool B ==
2017 European Baseball Championship - B-Pool
Tournament details
- Countries: Serbia; Poland
- Dates: 24–29 July 2017
- Teams: 10

Top team from each group qualified for the playoff, winner of which (Austria) qualified for the 2019 European Baseball Championship, bottom team from each group was relegated to C-Pool.

=== Pool 1 – Belgrade ===
Qualified for Final
Did not qualify for Final

Teams	W	L
Austria	4	1
Israel	3	2
Switzerland	3	2
Serbia	2	3
Bulgaria	2	3
Greece	1	4

==== Final ====
July 29, 2017	Austria	12 – 2 (7)	Israel

Qualified for Playoff Series
Relegated to C-Pool

==== Final standings ====
#	Teams
1	Austria
2	Israel
3	Switzerland
4	Serbia
5	Bulgaria
6	Greece

=== Pool 2 – Miejska Górka ===
Qualified for Final
Did not qualify for Final

Teams	W	L
Russia	4	1
Lithuania	3	2
Slovakia	2	3
Belarus	2	3
Poland	2	3
Ukraine	2	3

==== Final ====
July 29, 2017	Russia	3–8	Lithuania

Qualified for Playoff Series
Relegated to C-Pool

==== Final standings ====
#	Teams
1	Lithuania
2	Russia
3	Slovakia
4	Belarus
5	Poland
6	Ukraine

== 2018 Playoff Series ==
Winner of the best-of-three playoff series qualified for the 2019 European Baseball Championship. Playoffs were hosted by Wiener Neustadt.

June 29, 2018	Austria	10–0 (7)	Lithuania

June 30, 2018	Lithuania	3–25 (5)	Austria

July 1, 2018	Austria	not necessary	Lithuania

Austria qualified for the 2019 European Baseball Championship.

== 2018 Pool C ==
Qualification for 2019 European Baseball Championship C-Pool
Tournament details
- Countries: Ireland; Ukraine
- Dates: 23–28 July 2018
- Teams: 10

Two groups of 5 nations competed, with the winner of each group advancing to the B-Pool. The better of the two second-place teams (based on record, with first tie-breaker based on runs per inning differential) also advanced to the B Pool as a wild card.

=== Ashbourne Group ===
Qualified for Final
Did not qualify for Final

Teams	W	L	TQB
Ireland (H)	4	0	1.5575
Greece	3	1	0.4738
Finland	2	2	−0.1366
Slovenia	1	3	−1.0549
Norway	0	4	−1.6517

==== Final ====
The final was a rematch of Ireland vs. Greece; Ireland won the group round game 10–0 in eight innings and the final 12–2. Ireland advanced to Pool B as the winner. Greece, as the runner-up, also advanced as the wild card after Ukraine beat Romania in the Kropyvnytskyi group. Greece's 3–1 record in group play was better than Romania's 2–2 record.

July 28, 2018	Ireland	12–2 (7)	Greece	Ashbourne, Ireland
July 28, 2018		Boxscore		Ashbourne, Ireland

Qualified for B-level Tournament.

==== Final standings ====
#	Teams
1	Ireland
2	Greece
3	Finland
4	Slovenia
5	Norway

=== Kropyvnytskyi Group ===
Qualified for Final
Did not qualify for Final

Teams	W	L	TQB
Ukraine (H)	4	0	1.7418
Romania	2	2	0.0000
Georgia	2	2	−0.1613
Estonia	2	2	−0.7097
Hungary	0	4	−0.5572

The three-way tie between Romania, Georgia, and Estonia at 2–2 was won by Romania with a Team Quality Balance within games played between those three teams of 0.5125 against Georgia's -.0625 and Estonia's −0.4183.

==== Final ====
The final was a rematch between Ukraine and Romania; Ukraine won the group round game 13–0 in seven innings and the final 3–2 (again in seven innings, due to weather). Ukraine, as the winner, advanced to Pool B. The better runner-up between the two groups also advanced, but Romania's 2–2 record in group play was worse than that of 3–1 Greece (the Ashbourne group runner-up).

July 28, 2018	Ukraine	3–2	Romania	Kropyvnytskyi, Ukraine
July 28, 2018		Boxscore		Kropyvnytskyi, Ukraine

Qualified for B-level Tournament.

==== Final standings ====
#	Teams
1	Ukraine
2	Romania
3	Georgia
4	Estonia
5	Hungary

== 2019 Pool B ==
2019 European Baseball Championship B-Pool
Tournament details
- Countries: Slovakia; Bulgaria
- Dates: 1–6 July 2019
- Teams: 14

Pool B featured 14 teams competing in two groups of 6 and 8 teams. The two group winners faced off in the playoff for the last qualifying spot for the 2019 European Championship, which was won by Team Israel.

=== Teams ===
Nine teams remain from the 2017 Pool B competition:

- Belarus
- Bulgaria
- Israel
- Lithuania
- Poland
- Russia
- Serbia
- Slovakia
- Switzerland

Five additional teams advanced from 2018 Pool C.

- Greece
- Ireland
- Ukraine
- Romania
- Finland

=== Group 1 - Trnava ===
==== Pool A ====
Qualified for Semifinals
Did not qualify for Semifinals

#	Teams	W	L
1	Switzerland	3	0
2	Ukraine	2	1
3	Poland	1	2
4	Finland	0	3

==== Pool B ====
#	Teams	W	L
1	Slovakia (H)	2	1
2	Lithuania	2	1
3	Belarus	2	1
4	Romania	0	3

=== Play-offs ===
Semifinals
July 5 13:30 Trnava
Switzerland	7
Lithuania	12
July 5 17:00 Trnava
Slovakia	1
Ukraine	18

Finals
July 6 17:00 Trnava
Lithuania	7
Ukraine	5
3rd Place
July 6 13:30 Trnava
Switzerland	9
Slovakia	11

==== Semifinals ====
Semifinals order will be switched, because home team advanced to this round.

July 5, 2019; 13:30	Switzerland	7-12	Lithuania	Trnava; Attendance: 50
July 5, 2019; 13:30		Boxscore		Trnava; Attendance: 50

July 5, 2019; 17:00	Slovakia	1-18 (6)	Ukraine	Trnava
July 5, 2019; 17:00		Boxscore		Trnava

==== 3rd-place game ====
July 6, 2019; 13:30	Switzerland	9-11	Slovakia	Trnava; Attendance: 40
July 6, 2019; 13:30		Boxscore		Trnava; Attendance: 40

==== Final ====
July 6, 2019; 17:00	Lithuania	7-5	Ukraine	Trnava; Attendance: 100
July 6, 2019; 17:00		Boxscore		Trnava; Attendance: 100

==== Classification round – Pool C ====
Pos.	Teams	W	L
5	Belarus	3	0
6	Poland	2	1
7	Finland	1	2
8	Romania	0	3

=== Final standings ===
Qualified for Playoff Series

#	Teams
1	Lithuania
2	Ukraine
3	Slovakia
4	Switzerland
5	Belarus
6	Poland
7	Finland
8	Romania

=== Group 2 - Blagoevgrad ===
Qualified for Final
Did not qualify for Final

#	Teams	W	L
1	Israel	5	0
2	Russia	4	1
3	Greece	3	2
4	Serbia	2	3
5	Ireland	1	4
6	Bulgaria (H)	0	5

==== Final ====
July 6, 2019; 10:00	Israel	5-3	Russia	Blagoevgrad; Attendance: 126
July 6, 2019; 10:00		Boxscore		Blagoevgrad; Attendance: 126

==== Final standings ====
Qualified for Playoff Series

#	Teams
1	Israel
2	Russia
3	Greece
4	Serbia
5	Ireland
6	Bulgaria

== 2019 Playoff Series ==
The winner of the best-of-three playoff series qualified for the 2019 European Baseball Championship. Playoff host was Utena, Lithuania.

July 26, 2019; 14:00	Lithuania	2-12	Israel	Utena; Attendance: 354
July 26, 2019; 14:00		Boxscore		Utena; Attendance: 354

July 27, 2019; 14:00	Israel	15-0 (5)	Lithuania	Utena; Attendance: 402
July 27, 2019; 14:00		Boxscore		Utena; Attendance: 402

July 28, 2019; 14:00	Lithuania	not necessary	Israel

Israel qualified for the 2019 European Baseball Championship.
