= 2006 European Under-21 Baseball Championship =

Tournament details
- Country: Italy
- Dates: 9 July - 16 July
- Teams: 11

Final positions
- Champions: Russia
- Runners-up: France
- Third place: Italy
- Fourth place: Ukraine

The 2006 European Under-21 Baseball Championship was an international baseball competition held in the Friuli region of Italy from July 9 to 16, 2006. It featured teams from Austria, Bulgaria, Hungary, Israel, Italy, Malta, Russia, Serbia and Montenegro, Slovakia and Ukraine.

In the end the team from Russia won the tournament.

== Group stage ==
=== Pool A ===
==== Standings ====
Qualified for the semi-finals
Did not qualify for the semi-finals

#	Team	Games	Wins	Losses
1	France	5	5	0
2	Italy	5	4	1
3	Slovakia	5	3	2
4	Serbia and Montenegro	5	2	3
5	Hungary	5	1	4
6	Malta	5	0	5

July 9, 2006	Slovakia	5 – 4	Serbia and Montenegro	Staranzano, Italy

July 9, 2006	Italy	20 – 0 ^{(F/5)}	Hungary	Cervignano, Italy

July 9, 2006	Malta	0 – 25 ^{(F/5)}	France	Buttrio, Italy

July 10, 2006	Serbia and Montenegro	19 – 6 ^{(F/7)}	Malta	Cervignano, Italy

July 10, 2006	Hungary	0 – 21 ^{(F/5)}	Slovakia	Castions, Italy

July 10, 2006	France	3 – 2	Italy	Buttrio, Italy

July 11, 2006	Hungary	19 – 0 ^{(F/7)}	Malta	Castions, Italy

July 11, 2006	France	20 – 1 ^{(F/7)}	Serbia and Montenegro	Cervignano, Italy

July 11, 2006	Slovakia	0 – 10 ^{(F/7)}	Italy	Buttrio, Italy

July 12, 2006	Hungary	0 – 14 ^{(F/7)}	France	Cervignano, Italy

July 12, 2006	Slovakia	22 – 0 ^{(F/5)}	Malta	Castions, Italy

July 12, 2006	Italy	20 – 0 ^{(F/5)}	Serbia and Montenegro	Buttrio, Italy

July 13, 2006	France	10 – 4	Slovakia	Cervignano, Italy

July 13, 2006	Malta	0 – 9 ^{(Forfait)}	Italy	Castions, Italy

July 13, 2006	Serbia and Montenegro	8 – 2	Hungary	Buttrio, Italy

=== Pool B ===
==== Standings ====
Qualified for the semi-finals
Did not qualify for the semi-finals

#	Team	Games	Wins	Losses
1	Russia	4	4	0
2	Ukraine	4	3	2
3	Bulgaria	4	2	2
4	Austria	4	1	3
5	Israel	4	0	4

==== Game results ====
July 9, 2006	Austria	1 – 13	Ukraine	Redipuglia, Italy

July 9, 2006	Israel	0 – 10 ^{(F/7)}	Russia	Ronchi, Italy

July 10, 2006	Ukraine	6 – 3	Israel	Redipuglia, Italy

July 10, 2006	Bulgaria	4 – 3	Austria	Ronchi, Italy

July 11, 2006	Israel	6 – 17	Bulgaria	Buttrio, Italy

July 11, 2006	Russia	8 – 3	Ukraine	Ronchi, Italy

July 12, 2006	Austria	10 – 5	Israel	Redipuglia, Italy

July 12, 2006	Bulgaria	4 – 9	Russia	Staranzano, Italy

July 13, 2006	Ukraine	16 – 6 ^{(F/7)}	Bulgaria	Staranzano, Italy

July 13, 2006	Russia	18 – 6 ^{(F/7)}	Austria	Ronchi, Italy

== Final round ==
=== 9th place ===
July 15, 2006	Israel	7 – 3	Malta	Staranzano, Italy

July 16, 2006	Israel	11 – 4	Hungary	Castions, Italy

=== 7th place ===
July 15, 2006	Bulgaria	13 – 3 ^{(F/7)}	Serbia and Montenegro	Cervignano, Italy

July 16, 2006	Serbia and Montenegro	8 – 16	Austria	Staranzano, Italy

=== 5th place ===
July 15, 2006	Slovakia	11 – 5	Austria	Buttrio, Italy

July 16, 2006	Bulgaria	1 – 13 ^{(F/7)}	Slovakia	Buttrio, Italy

=== Semi-finals ===
July 15, 2006	Russia	4 – 1	Italy	Ronchi, Italy

July 15, 2006	France	14 – 9	Ukraine	Ronchi, Italy

=== 3rd place ===
July 16, 2006	Italy	10 – 0 ^{(F/7)}	Ukraine	Ronchi, Italy

=== Final ===
July 16, 2006	France	9 – 16	Russia	Ronchi, Italy

== Final standings ==
Rk	Team
1	Russia
Lost in Final
2	France
Failed to qualify for the Final
3	Italy
4	Ukraine
Failed to qualify for the semi-finals
5	Slovakia
6	Bulgaria
7	Austria
8	Serbia and Montenegro
9	Israel
10	Hungary
11	Malta

2006 European Under-21 Baseball Championship

Russia
