= 2021 European Baseball Championship =

Tournament details
- Country: Italy
- Dates: 12–19 September 2021
- Teams: 16
- Defending champions: Netherlands

Final positions
- Champions: Netherlands (24th title)
- Runners-up: Israel
- Third place: Italy
- Fourth place: Spain

Tournament statistics
- Games played: 48

Awards
- MVP: (Netherlands) Roger Bernadina

The 2021 European Baseball Championship was an international baseball tournament organized by WBSC Europe. The 2021 Championship was held September 12–19, 2021, in Turin, Italy.

== Qualification ==
The 12 teams from the 2019 European Championship qualified automatically for the tournament. Four additional teams, Russia, Ukraine, Slovakia, and Greece, qualified from the 17-team B-Pool tournament.

Team	Qualification result	Team	Qualification result
Netherlands	(gold) 2019 European Baseball Championship	Great Britain	9th, 2019 European Baseball Championship
Italy	(silver) 2019 European Baseball Championship	Austria	10th, 2019 European Baseball Championship
Spain	(bronze) 2019 European Baseball Championship	Croatia	11th, 2019 European Baseball Championship
Israel	4th, 2019 European Baseball Championship	Sweden	12th, 2019 European Baseball Championship
Czech Republic	5th, 2019 European Baseball Championship	Greece	Winner of the Utena qualification group against Lithuania
Germany	6th, 2019 European Baseball Championship	Russia	Winner of the Moscow qualification group against Belarus
Belgium	7th, 2019 European Baseball Championship	Slovakia	Winner of the Bratislava qualification group against Ireland
France	7th, 2019 European Baseball Championship	Ukraine	Winner of the Belgrade qualification group against Serbia

== Group stage ==
=== Group A ===
Pos	Team	Pld	W	L	RF	RA	RD	PCT	GB	Qualification
1	Italy (H)	3	3	0	41	7	+34	1.000	—	Qualified for Quarterfinals
2	Belgium	3	1	2	19	30	−11	.333	2	Qualified for Quarterfinals
3	Austria	3	1	2	26	39	−13	.333	2	Qualified for Relegation Round
4	Greece	3	1	2	21	31	−10	.333	2	Qualified for Relegation Round

(H) Hosts

12 September 2021	Belgium	11–12	Austria	Giovanni Paolo II municipal sports facility, Avigliana
12 September 2021		Boxscore		Giovanni Paolo II municipal sports facility, Avigliana

12 September 2021	Greece	3–13 (7)	Italy	Stadio Valter Aluffi, Settimo Torinese
12 September 2021		Boxscore		Stadio Valter Aluffi, Settimo Torinese

13 September 2021	Austria	13–14 (12)	Greece	Paschetto municipal stadium, Turin
13 September 2021		Boxscore		Paschetto municipal stadium, Turin

13 September 2021	Italy	14–3 (7)	Belgium	Paschetto municipal stadium, Turin
13 September 2021		Boxscore		Paschetto municipal stadium, Turin

14 September 2021	Greece	4–5	Belgium	Giovanni Paolo II municipal sports facility, Avigliana
14 September 2021		Boxscore		Giovanni Paolo II municipal sports facility, Avigliana

14 September 2021	Austria	1–14 (7)	Italy	Giovanni Paolo II municipal sports facility, Avigliana
14 September 2021		Boxscore		Giovanni Paolo II municipal sports facility, Avigliana

=== Group B ===
Pos	Team	Pld	W	L	RF	RA	RD	PCT	GB	Qualification
1	Spain	3	3	0	42	2	+40	1.000	—	Qualified for Quarterfinals
2	Croatia	3	2	1	17	17	0	.667	1	Qualified for Quarterfinals
3	Germany	3	1	2	19	28	−9	.333	2	Qualified for Relegation Round
4	Ukraine	3	0	3	8	39	−31	.000	3	Qualified for Relegation Round

12 September 2021	Germany	2–8	Croatia	Paschetto municipal stadium, Turin
12 September 2021		Boxscore		Paschetto municipal stadium, Turin

12 September 2021	Ukraine	0–15 (5)	Spain	Giovanni Paolo II municipal sports facility, Avigliana
12 September 2021		Boxscore		Giovanni Paolo II municipal sports facility, Avigliana

13 September 2021	Croatia	9–3	Ukraine	Giovanni Paolo II municipal sports facility, Avigliana
13 September 2021		Boxscore		Giovanni Paolo II municipal sports facility, Avigliana

13 September 2021	Spain	15–2 (7)	Germany	Stadio Valter Aluffi, Settimo Torinese
13 September 2021		Boxscore		Stadio Valter Aluffi, Settimo Torinese

14 September 2021	Ukraine	5–15 (7)	Germany	Giovanni Paolo II municipal sports facility, Avigliana
14 September 2021		Boxscore		Giovanni Paolo II municipal sports facility, Avigliana

14 September 2021	Croatia	0–12 (7)	Spain	Paschetto municipal stadium, Turin
14 September 2021		Boxscore		Paschetto municipal stadium, Turin

=== Group C ===
Pos	Team	Pld	W	L	RF	RA	RD	PCT	GB	Qualification
1	Israel	3	3	0	23	5	+18	1.000	—	Qualified for Quarterfinals
2	Great Britain	3	1	2	17	20	−3	.333	2	Qualified for Quarterfinals
3	Russia	3	1	2	12	13	−1	.333	2	Qualified for Relegation Round
4	France	3	1	2	7	21	−14	.333	2	Qualified for Relegation Round

12 September 2021	Russia	1–2 (10)	Israel	Paschetto municipal stadium, Turin
12 September 2021		Boxscore		Paschetto municipal stadium, Turin

12 September 2021	France	2–7	Great Britain	Giovanni Paolo II municipal sports facility, Avigliana
12 September 2021		Boxscore		Giovanni Paolo II municipal sports facility, Avigliana

13 September 2021	Great Britain	6–7	Russia	Paschetto municipal stadium, Turin
13 September 2021		Boxscore		Paschetto municipal stadium, Turin

13 September 2021	Israel	10–0	France	Giovanni Paolo II municipal sports facility, Avigliana
13 September 2021		Boxscore		Giovanni Paolo II municipal sports facility, Avigliana

14 September 2021	Great Britain	4–11	Israel	Stadio Valter Aluffi, Settimo Torinese
14 September 2021		Boxscore		Stadio Valter Aluffi, Settimo Torinese

14 September 2021	Russia	4–5	France	Paschetto municipal stadium, Turin
14 September 2021		Boxscore		Paschetto municipal stadium, Turin

=== Group D ===
Pos	Team	Pld	W	L	RF	RA	RD	PCT	GB	Qualification
1	Netherlands	3	3	0	37	6	+31	1.000	—	Qualified for Quarterfinals
2	Czech Republic	3	2	1	20	15	+5	.667	1	Qualified for Quarterfinals
3	Sweden	3	1	2	17	21	−4	.333	2	Qualified for Relegation Round
4	Slovakia	3	0	3	3	35	−32	.000	3	Qualified for Relegation Round

12 September 2021	Czech Republic	6–1	Sweden	Stadio Valter Aluffi, Settimo Torinese
12 September 2021		Boxscore		Stadio Valter Aluffi, Settimo Torinese

12 September 2021	Slovakia	0–11 (7)	Netherlands	Paschetto municipal stadium, Turin
12 September 2021		Boxscore		Paschetto municipal stadium, Turin

13 September 2021	Sweden	11–0 (7)	Slovakia	Stadio Valter Aluffi, Settimo Torinese
13 September 2021		Boxscore		Stadio Valter Aluffi, Settimo Torinese

13 September 2021	Netherlands	11–1	Czech Republic	Giovanni Paolo II municipal sports facility, Avigliana
13 September 2021		Boxscore		Giovanni Paolo II municipal sports facility, Avigliana

14 September 2021	Sweden	5–15 (7)	Netherlands	Stadio Valter Aluffi, Settimo Torinese
14 September 2021		Boxscore		Stadio Valter Aluffi, Settimo Torinese

14 September 2021	Slovakia	3–13 (7)	Czech Republic	Paschetto municipal stadium, Turin
14 September 2021		Boxscore		Paschetto municipal stadium, Turin

== Play-offs ==
Quarter-finals
16 September, 20:30
C1 Israel	3
D2 Czech Republic	2
16 September, 15:00
A1 Italy	8
B2 Croatia	5
16 September, 15:30
B1 Spain	5
A2 Belgium	2
16 September, 20:30
D1 Netherlands	7
C2 Great Britain	5

Semi-finals
17 September, 20:30
Israel	11
Italy	5
17 September, 15:00
Spain	8
Netherlands	9

Final
19 September, 20:30
Israel	4
Netherlands	9
3rd Place
19 September, 15:00
Italy	2
Spain	0

=== Quarter-finals ===
16 September 2021; 15:00	Italy	8–5	Croatia	Stadio Valter Aluffi, Settimo Torinese
16 September 2021; 15:00		Boxscore		Stadio Valter Aluffi, Settimo Torinese

16 September 2021; 15:30	Spain	5–2	Belgium	Paschetto municipal stadium, Turin
16 September 2021; 15:30		Boxscore		Paschetto municipal stadium, Turin

16 September 2021; 20:30	Israel	3–2	Czech Republic	Giovanni Paolo II municipal sports facility, Avigliana
16 September 2021; 20:30		Boxscore		Giovanni Paolo II municipal sports facility, Avigliana

16 September 2021; 20:30	Netherlands	7–5	Great Britain	Paschetto municipal stadium, Turin
16 September 2021; 20:30		Boxscore		Paschetto municipal stadium, Turin

=== Semi-finals ===
17 September 2021; 16:00	Spain	8–9	Netherlands	Giovanni Paolo II municipal sports facility, Avigliana
17 September 2021; 16:00		Boxscore		Giovanni Paolo II municipal sports facility, Avigliana

17 September 2021; 20:30	Israel	11–5	Italy	Giovanni Paolo II municipal sports facility, Avigliana
17 September 2021; 20:30		Boxscore		Giovanni Paolo II municipal sports facility, Avigliana

=== Bronze-medal ===
19 September 2021; 15:00	Italy	2–0	Spain	Paschetto municipal stadium, Turin
19 September 2021; 15:00		Boxscore		Paschetto municipal stadium, Turin

=== Final ===
19 September 2021; 20:30	Israel	4–9	Netherlands	Paschetto municipal stadium, Turin
19 September 2021; 20:30		Boxscore		Paschetto municipal stadium, Turin

== Placement round 5th–8th place ==
Classification games
17 September, 15:30
Czech Republic	17
Croatia	2
17 September, 15:00
Belgium	11
Great Britain	12

5th place
18 September, 20:30
Czech Republic	8
Great Britain	5
7th place
18 September, 15:00
Belgium	8
Croatia	12

=== Classification games ===
17 September 2021; 15:00	Belgium	11–12	Great Britain	Stadio Valter Aluffi, Settimo Torinese
17 September 2021; 15:00		Boxscore		Stadio Valter Aluffi, Settimo Torinese

17 September 2021; 15:30	Czech Republic	17–2	Croatia	Paschetto municipal stadium, Turin
17 September 2021; 15:30		Boxscore		Paschetto municipal stadium, Turin

=== 7th place ===
18 September 2021; 15:00	Belgium	8–12	Croatia	Stadio Valter Aluffi, Settimo Torinese
18 September 2021; 15:00		Boxscore		Stadio Valter Aluffi, Settimo Torinese

=== 5th place ===
18 September 2021; 20:30	Great Britain	5–8	Czech Republic	Giovanni Paolo II municipal sports facility, Avigliana
18 September 2021; 20:30		Boxscore		Giovanni Paolo II municipal sports facility, Avigliana

== Relegation rounds ==
Relegation round
15 September, 16:00
A3 Austria	4
D4 Slovakia	3
15 September, 15:00
C3 Russia	15
B4 Ukraine	5
15 September, 15:30
D3 Sweden	10
A4 Greece	0
15 September, 20:30
B3 Germany	3
C4 France	2

9–12th places
16 September, 10:30
Austria	4
Russia	14
16 September, 16:00
Sweden	2
Germany	13

9th place
18 September, 15:30
Russia	1
Germany	4
11th place
18 September, 11:00
Austria	5
Sweden	0

=== Relegation round ===
15 September 2021; 15:00	Russia	15–5 (7)	Ukraine	Stadio Valter Aluffi, Settimo Torinese
15 September 2021; 15:00		Boxscore		Stadio Valter Aluffi, Settimo Torinese

15 September 2021; 15:30	Germany	3–2	France	Paschetto municipal stadium, Turin
15 September 2021; 15:30		Boxscore		Paschetto municipal stadium, Turin

15 September 2021; 16:00	Austria	4–3	Slovakia	Giovanni Paolo II municipal sports facility, Avigliana
15 September 2021; 16:00		Boxscore		Giovanni Paolo II municipal sports facility, Avigliana

15 September 2021; 20:30	Sweden	10–0 (7)	Greece	Giovanni Paolo II municipal sports facility, Avigliana
15 September 2021; 20:30		Boxscore		Giovanni Paolo II municipal sports facility, Avigliana

=== 9–12th places classification ===
16 September 2021; 10:30	Austria	4–14 (7)	Russia	Paschetto municipal stadium, Turin
16 September 2021; 10:30		Boxscore		Paschetto municipal stadium, Turin

16 September 2021; 16:00	Sweden	2–13 (7)	Germany	Giovanni Paolo II municipal sports facility, Avigliana
16 September 2021; 16:00		Boxscore		Giovanni Paolo II municipal sports facility, Avigliana

=== 11th place ===
18 September 2021; 11:00	Austria	5–0	Sweden	Giovanni Paolo II municipal sports facility, Avigliana
18 September 2021; 11:00		Boxscore		Giovanni Paolo II municipal sports facility, Avigliana

=== 9th place ===
18 September 2021; 15:30	Russia	1–4	Germany	Paschetto municipal stadium, Turin
18 September 2021; 15:30		Boxscore		Paschetto municipal stadium, Turin

=== 13–16th places classification ===
13–16th places
17 September, 10:00
Slovakia	4
Ukraine	5
17 September, 10:30
Greece	12
France	9

13th place
18 September, 10:30
Ukraine	5
Greece	4
15th place
18 September, 10:00
Slovakia	5
France	6

17 September 2021; 10:00	Slovakia	4–5	Ukraine	Stadio Valter Aluffi, Settimo Torinese
17 September 2021; 10:00		Boxscore		Stadio Valter Aluffi, Settimo Torinese

17 September 2021; 10:30	Greece	12–9	France	Paschetto municipal stadium, Turin
17 September 2021; 10:30		Boxscore		Paschetto municipal stadium, Turin

=== 15th place ===
18 September 2021; 10:00	Slovakia	5–6	France	Stadio Valter Aluffi, Settimo Torinese
18 September 2021; 10:00		Boxscore		Stadio Valter Aluffi, Settimo Torinese

=== 13th place ===
18 September 2021; 10:30	Ukraine	5–4	Greece	Paschetto municipal stadium, Turin
18 September 2021; 10:30		Boxscore		Paschetto municipal stadium, Turin

== Final standings ==
Rk	Team	W	L	Pct.	R	RA
1st place, gold medalist(s)	Netherlands	6	0	1.0	62	23
2nd place, silver medalist(s)	Israel	5	1	.833	42	21
3rd place, bronze medalist(s)	Italy	5	1	.833	56	23
4	Spain	4	2	.667	55	15
5	Czech Republic	4	2	.667	47	25
6	Great Britain	2	4	.333	39	46
7	Croatia	3	3	.500	36	50
8	Belgium	1	5	.167	40	59
9	Germany	4	2	.667	39	33
10	Russia	3	3	.500	42	26
11	Austria	3	3	.500	39	56
12	Sweden	2	4	.333	29	39
13	Ukraine	2	4	.333	23	52
14	Greece	2	4	.333	37	54
15	France	2	4	.333	24	41
16	Slovakia	0	6	.000	15	50

== Statistics leaders ==
=== Batting ===
Statistic	Name	Total/Avg
Batting average*	(Spain) Edison Valerio	.682
Hits	(Spain) Edison Valerio	15
Runs	(Netherlands) Roger Bernadina	13
Home runs	(Czech Republic) Matěj Hejma (Israel) Assaf Lowengart	4
RBIs	(Israel) Assaf Lowengart	13
Walks	(Netherlands) Roger Bernadina	9
Strikeouts	(Israel) Jordan Petrushka	13
Stolen bases	(Netherlands) Ray-Patrick Didder	7
On-base percentage*	(Spain) Edison Valerio	.731
Slugging percentage*	(Spain) Edison Valerio	1.136
OPS*	(Spain) Edison Valerio	1.867

* Minimum 2.7 plate appearances per game

=== Pitching ===
Statistic	Name	Total/Avg
Wins	5 players	2
Losses	4 players	2
Saves	(Netherlands) Wendell Floranus	3
Innings pitched	(Ukraine) Heorhii Hvrytishvili (Israel) Joey Wagman	16.0
Hits allowed	(Greece) Jonathan Kountis	19
Runs allowed	(Belgium) Drew Janssen	18
Earned runs allowed	(Belgium) Drew Janssen	13
ERA*	(United Kingdom) Alexander Webb	0.00
Walks	(Greece) Alex Gounaris	10
Strikeouts	(Israel) Joey Wagman	18

* Minimum 1.0 inning pitched per game
