= Portugal national baseball team =

Information
- Country: Portugal
- Federation: Portuguese Baseball and Softball Federation
- Confederation: WBSC Europe

WBSC ranking
- Current: NR (26 March 2026)

The Portugal national baseball team is the national baseball team of Portugal. The team represents Portugal in international competitions, including the World Baseball Classic (WBC). Baseball is still a relatively unknown sport in Portugal. Many of the Portuguese baseball players are from Portuguese communities in Canada, United States and Venezuela. The first Portuguese baseball stadium, Estádio Municipal de Abrantes, was inaugurated on 22 July 2006.

Portugal was involved in the 2010 European Baseball Championship qualifier tournament, in Abrantes, with Ireland, Greece and Russia. On 9 July 2008, the Portuguese team beat Ireland by 11-8, but lost to Greece by 3-11 at 11 July, and to Russia by 0-10, at 11 July, being eliminated.

== See also ==
- Portugal baseball League
