= Malta Baseball and Softball Association =

- Sport: Baseball and softball
- Jurisdiction: Malta
- Abbreviation: MABS
- Founded: 1983
- Affiliation: WBSC
- Regional affiliation: WBSC Europe
- Headquarters: Marsa Sports Complex, Malta
- President: Andrew Bajo

Official website
- baseballsoftball.org.mt
- (Malta)

The Malta Baseball and Softball Association (MABS) is the national governing body of baseball and softball in Malta.

== History ==
Baseball and softball are minor but growing sports in Malta and first started in 1980, led by an ex-pat American doctor, Dr Fredericks, who gave lessons in softball to students at Stella Maris College, in Gzira. As softball grew in popularity Dr Fredericks moved to the Marsa Sports Complex, and using borrowed equipment from the Verdala International School he started to teach baseball. The early players of the sport on the island, under the tutelage of Dr Fredericks, were mainly Canadian and US citizens living in Malta. Maltese children soon began to take up the sports, the legacy of which can be seen today in that Patrick Pace, the founder of the Mustangs Baseball Club was one of those children.

The Malta Baseball and Softball Association was formed in 1983, with the support of representatives from the Federazione Italiana Baseball Softball. MABS joined the Confederation of European Baseball in 1983 and in 2010, it joined the European Softball Federation (ESF).

== MABS Board ==
The current MABS board is comprised as follows:

- President: Andrew Bajo
- Vice President: Charles Micallef
- Treasurer: Oliver Frendo
- Secretary General: Kevin Spiteri
- Director of Baseball: Michael Bartolo
- Director of Softball: Joseph Scicluna
- Public Relations and Events Manager: Christine Bezzina

=== Previous Presidents ===
- Jeff Tabone
