= Danieli =

Italian equipment company

Danieli & C. Officine Meccaniche S.p.A.
- Company type: Società per azioni
- Traded as: BIT: DAN; FTSE Italia Mid Cap
- Industry: Metal, Manufacturing, Steel
- Founded: 1914
- Founders: Mario Danieli; Timo Danieli
- Headquarters: Buttrio, Italy
- Key people: Gianpietro Benedetti, Chairman; Giacomo Mareschi Danieli, CEO, Camilla Benedetti (Vice President)
- Products: Engineering, Equipment, Plants
- Revenue: €2.80 billion (2020)
- Operating income: €0.58 billion (2018)
- Net income: €62.42 million (2020)
- Number of employees: 9,060 (2020)
- Website: www.danieli.com

Danieli Group (Italian pronunciation: [danˈjɛːli]) is an Italian supplier of equipment and physical plants to the metal industry. The company is based in Buttrio, in the north-east of Italy (Friuli-Venezia Giulia region). It is one of the world leaders in the production of steel plants, in particular in the long products segment, where it owned 30% market share in 1999 .

It has more than 25 divisions worldwide (design, manufacturing and service centers), 7 of which are production centers (Italy, Russia, Austria, Brazil, Netherlands, Sweden, the United States, Vietnam, Germany, India, China, and Thailand). Because of the company's continued business with Russia amid the Russian invasion of Ukraine, Danieli is listed among International Sponsors of War by the Ukrainian National Agency on Corruption Prevention. In response, the company has declared its withdrawal from the Russian market due to the evolving geopolitical landscape, rendering commercial engagements and establishment in Russia unfeasible. The company has also reaffirmed its consistent adherence to sanctions.

== History ==
Danieli’s origins date to 1914 when two brothers Mario and Timo Danieli acquired the Angelini Steelworks in Brescia, Italy, one of the first companies to use the electric arc furnace for steel making. In 1929, Mario Danieli transferred part of the steelworks to Buttrio to manufacture tools for forging plants and auxiliary machines for rolling mills. After World War II, led by Luigi Danieli, the company changed its name to Danieli & C and started designing and manufacturing equipment for the steel industry, a turning point that contributed to strengthening the Italian steel industry’s competitiveness in Europe in the Sixties and Seventies.

In the second half of the Seventies, a crisis affected the entire steel industry due to an excess production capacity. Luigi Danieli (1915-1993), who held a degree in Engineering from the University of Padua (Italy), adopted a different strategy and led the company to gradually pass from the production of machines for the steel-making industry to the production of turnkey plants. In 1976 the company won the design and production of a 500,000-ton steel plant in Brandenburg, in the former East Germany, beating the competition of the Krupp company with a 3% lower bid. The total value of the order was approximately 200 billion Italian lire. Since 1977 Luigi Danieli has been working together with Cecilia and Anna Chiara, two of his four daughters. In 1979, Danieli’s turnover was over 130 billion Italian lire (80% of which was made abroad) and the company employed 1,600 people.

Specialized in the production of mini-mills according to the needs of final consumers, in 1983 its production reached one million tons per year. In the same period, it won contracts in the USSR and North Africa.

In 1984, the company was listed on the Milan Stock Exchange. In 1985 Danieli completed the first direct rolling plant for quality steel in the USA. In the mid-eighties, the steel industry again encountered difficulties. A different strategy emerged within the Danieli family in order to remain competitive: Cecilia, who held a degree in Economics and Business from the University of Trieste (Italy), and Gianpietro Benedetti were in favor of a major restructuring, in line with a strategy of internationalization and expansion of products. The rest of the family had a different point of view. Eventually, 58% of the ordinary shares were sold to SIND (Società Impianti Industriali), held 50% by Cecilia Danieli and 50% by Gianpietro Benedetti.

Following the new corporate structure, the expansion around the world continued. In 1987 Danieli acquired Morgårdshammar, a Swedish group specializing in rolling plants for special steels, and later Wean United (USA), Rotelec (France) and Sund (Sweden).

The results seemed to justify that generational change wanted by Cecilia: Danieli’s turnover was indeed constantly growing – reaching 1.9 billion Italian Lire in 2000 – with 3,200 people employed.

In June 1999 Cecilia Danieli died in Aviano at the age of 56.

Gianpietro Benedetti was appointed President and CEO of the company. At the end of the 1990s the internationalization process was completed: in addition to that of Buttrio, Danieli opened production plants in Pittsburgh, Paris, Sweden and Germany, two offices in China (Beijing and Shanghai), other production plants in Thailand (Danieli Far East) and Russia (Danieli Volga), as well as service centers in Austria and Brazil. This also led to an expansion of the company’s product range.

In 2009, ten years after the death of Cecilia Danieli, the 29-year-old Giacomo Mareschi Danieli joined the company’s Board of Directors. Graduated in Electronic Engineering from the Polytechnic University of Milan, since 2006 he has been working in the Danieli Group. Anna, who is Giacomo’s twin and a graduate in Economics and Business from Bocconi University, also joined the company, as well as Camilla Benedetti, a graduate in Economics and Business from Catholic University of Milan and with previous professional experience at Ernst & Young. In 2009, the turnover reached 3.2 billion euros and the profit was 135 million euros, with approximately 9,400 people employed.

In 2018 the company founded the Danieli Academy, with the aim of managing the skills development of human resources through partnerships with hundreds of universities around the world.

== Companies of the Danieli Group ==
- ABS Sisak
- Danieli Automation & Digi&Met (industrial automation and process control systems)
- Danieli Plant Engineering (turnkey plants and systems engineering)
- Danieli Morgårdshammar (long product rolling mills)
- Danieli Corus IJMUIDEN (integrated steelmaking plants)
- Danieli Centro Met (electric steelmaking plant, continuous casting)
- Danieli Davy Distington (thick and thin slab casting)
- Danieli Wean United (flat product rolling mills)
- Danieli Fröhling (flat product conditioning and finishing plants)
- Danieli Centro Tube (seamless pipe plants)
- Danieli Centro Maskin (long product conditioning and finishing plants, slab inspection and grinding)
- Danieli Rotelec (electromagnetic stirrers and induction heating systems)
- Danieli Breda (extrusion and forging plants)
- Danieli Centro Combustion (heating systems and heat treatment furnaces)
- Danieli Environment Systems (green technologies and systems)
- Danieli Construction (turnkey plants)
- Danieli Service (assembly, start-up and testing of Danieli plants)
- Danieli Centro Cranes (heavy-duty cranes)
- Danieli Telerobot (advanced robotics)
- Danieli Linz (oxygen converter steelmaking plants)
- Danieli Centro Recycling (scrap processing plants)
- Danieli Olivotto Ferrè (heat treatment furnaces)
- Danieli Kohler (air wiping equipment for zinc coating)
- Danieli Fata Hunter (aluminium rolling and coil coating lines)
- Innoval Technology Ltd (advisor services and technical support for the aluminum industry)
- Danieli Hydraulics (industrial hydraulics and lubrication)
- Fata Epc (turnkey plant engineering, procurement and construction)

== Economic data ==
The financial statements for the year ended 30 June 2017 showed revenues at €2.49 billion, with an income of €59 million. As of 30 June 2018, the Group’s turnover was €2.70 billion (+2%), EBITDA amounted to €228 million (13%), EBIT to €103 million (48%), and revenues to €58.4 million. The financial statements for the year ended 30 June 2019 showed revenues at €3 billion, net income at €67 million, EBITDA at €239.2 million, EBIT at €101.51 million. As of 30 June 2020, the Group’s turnover was €2.8 billion, net income amounted to €62.4 million, EBITDA to €187.7 million, EBIT to €91.6 million.

== See also ==
- List of Italian companies
