= Tomas Valincius =

American baseball player (born 2005)

Mississippi State Bulldogs
- Pitcher
- Born: September 11, 2005 (age 21); Chicago, Illinois, U.S.
- Bats: Left Throws: Left

Tomas Valincius (born September 11, 2005) is an American college baseball pitcher for the Mississippi State Bulldogs. He previously played for the Virginia Cavaliers.

== Career ==
Valincius is of Lithuanian heritage through his parents, and started playing for the Lithuania national baseball team when he was 12 and was named the teams MVP when he was 16. He attended Baylor School in Chattanooga, Tennessee, where he was a pitcher and first baseman. As a senior, Valincius went 8–0 with a 1.14 earned run average (ERA). He was named Tennessee's Mr. Baseball his junior and senior seasons and the Tennessee Gatorade Baseball Player of the Year his senior year. Valincius committed to the University of Virginia to play college baseball.

As a freshman at Virginia, Valincius pitched in 13 games with 12 starts and went 5–1 with a 4.59 ERA and 70 strikeouts in 64 2/3 innings. After the season, he transferred to Mississippi State University. He became the team's number one starter his first season in 2026.

== Personal life ==
His brother, Vytas, also played baseball for Mississippi State.
