= Buttrio =

Buttrio Buri (Friulian)
- Comune
- Comune di Buttrio
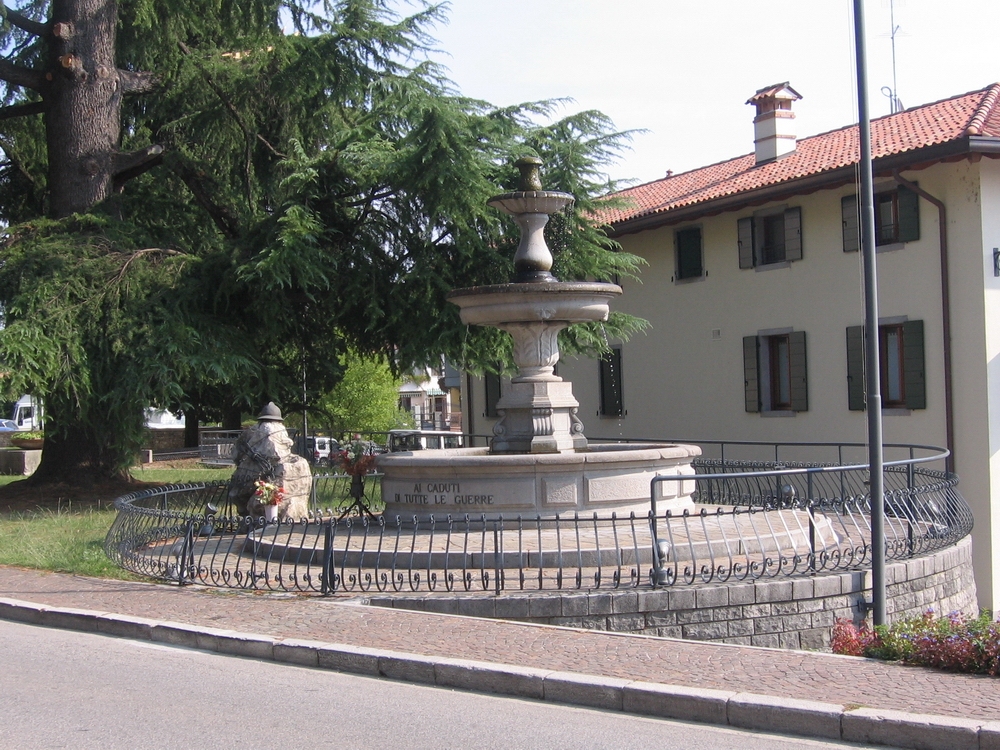
- Fountain and war memorial

- Coat of arms

- Location of the municipality of Buttrio in the former province of Udine

- Location within Italy Location within Friuli-Venezia Giulia
- Coordinates: 46°1′N 13°20′E
- Country: Italy
- Region: Friuli-Venezia Giulia
- Province: Udine (UD)
- Frazioni: Camino, Caminetto, Vicinale

Government
  - Mayor: Eliano Bassi (lista civica "Giovinburi")

Area
  - Total: 17.75 km^{2} (6.85 sq mi)
- Elevation: 79 m (259 ft)

Population (30/06/2025)
  - Total: 3,924
  - Density: 221.1/km^{2} (572.6/sq mi)
- Demonym: Buttriesi
- Time zone: UTC+1 (CET)
  - Summer (DST): UTC+2 (CEST)
- Postal code: 33042
- Dialing code: 0432
- Patron saint: Assumption of Mary
- Saint day: August 15
- Website: Official website

Buttrio (Friulian: Buri) is a comune (municipality) in the Regional decentralization entity of Udine in the Italian region of Friuli-Venezia Giulia, located about 60 kilometres (37 mi) northwest of Trieste and about 10 kilometres (6 mi) southeast of Udine. It has a population of 3,924 people.

Buttrio borders the following municipalities: Manzano, Pavia di Udine, Pradamano, Premariacco.

== Physical Geography ==
=== Territory ===
Buttrio is located on a plain at the base of a hill 146 meters above sea level. In ancient times, the Friulian plain was inundated by the sea, and the coasts almost reached the current Julian Prealps. At the bottom of this lagoon, over the millennia, a slow process of sedimentation took place, giving rise to imposing formations that, with the retreat of the sea, emerged from the waters. These Eocene deposits today appear as alternating layers of marl and sandstone with a very characteristic appearance. The soil composition makes them suitable for viticulture. Over the centuries, the profile of the slopes has been shaped by the work of generations of winemakers.

Buttrio's geographical location allows for substantial viticulture leading to its renowned wines, with the Julian Alps behind it, protecting the vines from cold northerly winds, and the Adriatic Sea in front, ensuring beneficial and constant ventilation.

== History ==
The municipality was founded in 1811 and was annexed to Italy on August 11, 1866.

During the First World War, it was a rear-line town where numerous field hospitals were built. After the retreat from Caporetto, it was occupied, seeing many of its citizens deported. Before the armistice came into force, the Italian army attempted to reconquer most of the lost territories. It managed to recover several towns in the Carnic and Julian Alps, including Buttrio, Manzano, and Cormons.

After the Second World War, Buttrio was home to the "Collegio dei Mutilatini." for a dozen years, it welcomed around a hundred boys and girls who had been injured or maimed by the explosion of war remnants in the first years after the end of World War II.

== Monuments and Places of Interest ==
=== Religious Architecture ===
- Parish Church of Santa Maria Assunta: it is the parish of Buttrio, in the province and archdiocese of Udine; it is part of the deanery of Eastern Friuli.
- Church of Santo Stefano Protomartyr: it was built on the ruins of a Roman settlement, a fact reflected in its name. Located near the Church of Santa Maria Assunta, the church was built around the mid-14th century and consecrated in May 1366.

=== Civil architecture ===
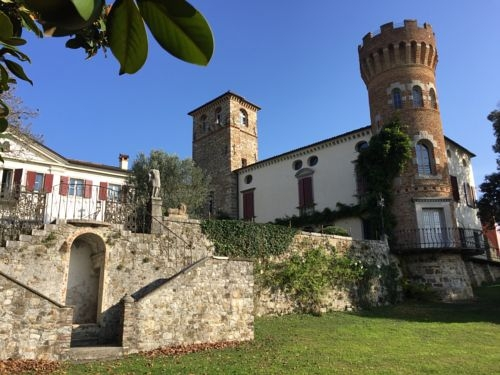
Villa Morpurgo

- Villa Morpurgo: it is a recently restored fortified villa. The original building dates back to the late 10th century and served as a defensive and lookout manor. It was enfeoffed to the Counts of Gorizia, who then entrusted it to the Lords of Buttrio. The entire complex is protected by the Superintendency of Cultural Heritage.
- Villa Bartolini-Caimo-Dragoni-Florio-Danieli

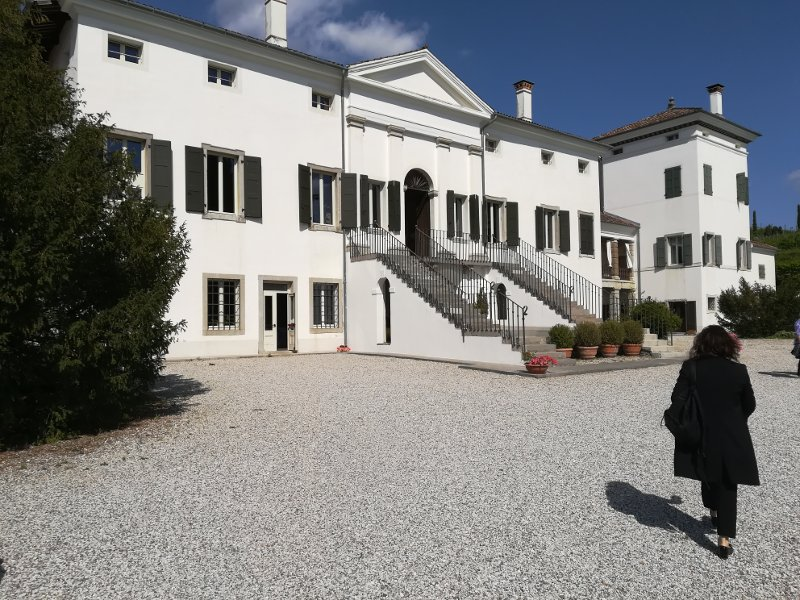
Villa Bartolini-Caimo-Dragoni-Florio-Danieli

A splendid cypress-lined avenue leads to this residence, founded in the 17th century by the Bartolini family. The building dates back to the 17th century and consists of a large manor house, the central body of which is flanked by two square-plan towers. A double-flight staircase caps the splendid central section of the façade, with important classical reminiscences. The interiors were decorated by Francesco Chiarottini and Giambattista Canal with sumptuous allegorical scenes.

For many years, it served as the venue for the Buttrio Regional Wine Fair, before the upper Villa Florio became available.

The complex was later purchased by the Danieli family. It is this latter family that painstakingly restored the frescoes and restored the building to its former functional state, which has now been completely renovated.

- Villa di Toppo-Florio: it was founded in the first half of the 18th century by the Toppo family. It was expanded during the following century when the Florio family took over. The importance of the villa is also due to the vast park that belongs to it, which descends from the hill to the plain along the road that leads to Manzano. The villa and the park form an indivisible unit that has been preserved over time in an exemplary manner.

== Demographic evolution ==
Historical population

Year	Pop.	±%
1861	?	—
1871	1,986	—
1881	2,008	+1.1%
1901	2,240	+11.6%
1911	2,245	+0.2%
1921	2,610	+16.3%

Year	Pop.	±%
1931	2,538	−2.8%
1936	2,527	−0.4%
1951	2,623	+3.8%
1961	2,972	+13.3%
1971	2,939	−1.1%
1981	3,646	+24.1%

Year	Pop.	±%
1991	3,696	+1.4%
2001	3,788	+2.5%
2011	4,039	+6.6%
2021	3,678	−8.9%

Source: Data from ISTAT

=== Ethnic groups and foreign minorities ===
As of December 31, 2024 there were 420 foreigners residing in the municipality, or 10.3% of the population. The largest foreign community is that from Romania with 36.3% of all foreigners present in the country, followed by Ukraine and Albania.

== Languages and dialects ==
In Buttrio, the population speaks Friulian in addition to Italian. Pursuant to Resolution No. 2680 of August 3, 2001, issued by the Regional Council of Friuli-Venezia Giulia, the municipality is included in the territorial protection of the Friulian language for the purposes of Law 482/99, Regional Law 15/96, and Regional Law 29/2007. The Friulian language spoken in Buttrio is one of the variants of Central-Eastern Friulian.

== Economy ==
=== Agriculture ===
The municipal territory is included in three DOCs: the hilly portion belongs to the "Colli Orientali del Friuli" DOC, while the flatter portion belongs to the "Grave del Friuli" DOC and is also included in the "Prosecco" DOC. Furthermore, Buttrio is a member of the national "Città del Vino" association. The wines produced in Buttrio, which are generally of excellent quality, include whites (Ribolla Gialla, Friulano, Chardonnay, Pinot Grigio, Sauvignon) and reds (Merlot, Cabernet Franc and Cabernet Sauvignon, Pinot Noir, Refosco dal Peduncolo Rosso). Currently, over 20 specialized wineries operate in the area; they are managed according to modern criteria.

=== Industry ===
Danieli & C. Officine Meccaniche S.p.A., known simply as Danieli, is a multinational with its headquarters and main plant in Buttrio. It is a world leader in the production of steelmaking equipment, particularly in the long products sector, where it holds a global market share of over 90%.

The company was founded in 1914 by Mario and Timo Danieli. Over the years, Danieli has adopted a strategy of transitioning from the construction of steelmaking machinery to the delivery of turnkey plants.

== Infrastructure and transport ==
Buttrio is served by the following roads:

- the former Gorizia State Road 56 (SS 56), now Gorizia Regional Road 56 (SR 56), which connects Buttrio to the cities of Udine and Gorizia and the city of Trieste, joining the former Redipuglia State Road 305 (SS 305), now Redipuglia Regional Road 305 (SR 305), and then the Venezia Giulia State Road 14 (SS 14);
- the Orsaria Provincial Road 14, which connects Buttrio to Cividale del Friuli;
- the Provincial Road 14 bis.

The municipality is served by a stop on the Udine-Trieste railway line with regional trains operated by Trenitalia under the service contract stipulated with the Friuli Venezia Giulia Region.

== People ==
- Andrea Comparetti, physician and scientist
- Marco Racaniello, pianist and composer
- Giulio Tami, filmmaker, cinematographer, and editor
- Giovanni Battista Beltrame, agronomist

== Twin towns ==
- Nötsch im Gailtal, Austria
