= Malta national baseball team =

National baseball team representing Malta

Information
- Country: Malta
- Federation: Malta Baseball and Softball Association
- Confederation: Confederation of European Baseball

WBSC ranking
- Current: NR (26 October 2026)

Uniforms
Home	Away

Olympic Games
- Appearances: 0

World Baseball Classic
- Appearances: 0

World Cup
- Appearances: 0

Intercontinental Cup
- Appearances: 0

European Championship
- Appearances: 0

The Malta national baseball team is the national baseball team of Malta. The team represents Malta in international competitions. It is governed by the Malta Baseball and Softball Association (MABS), and is also a member nation of the Confederation of European Baseball.

== Tournament results ==
European Under-21 Baseball Championship

- 2006 : 11th
