= Staranzano =

- Comune
- Comune di Staranzano
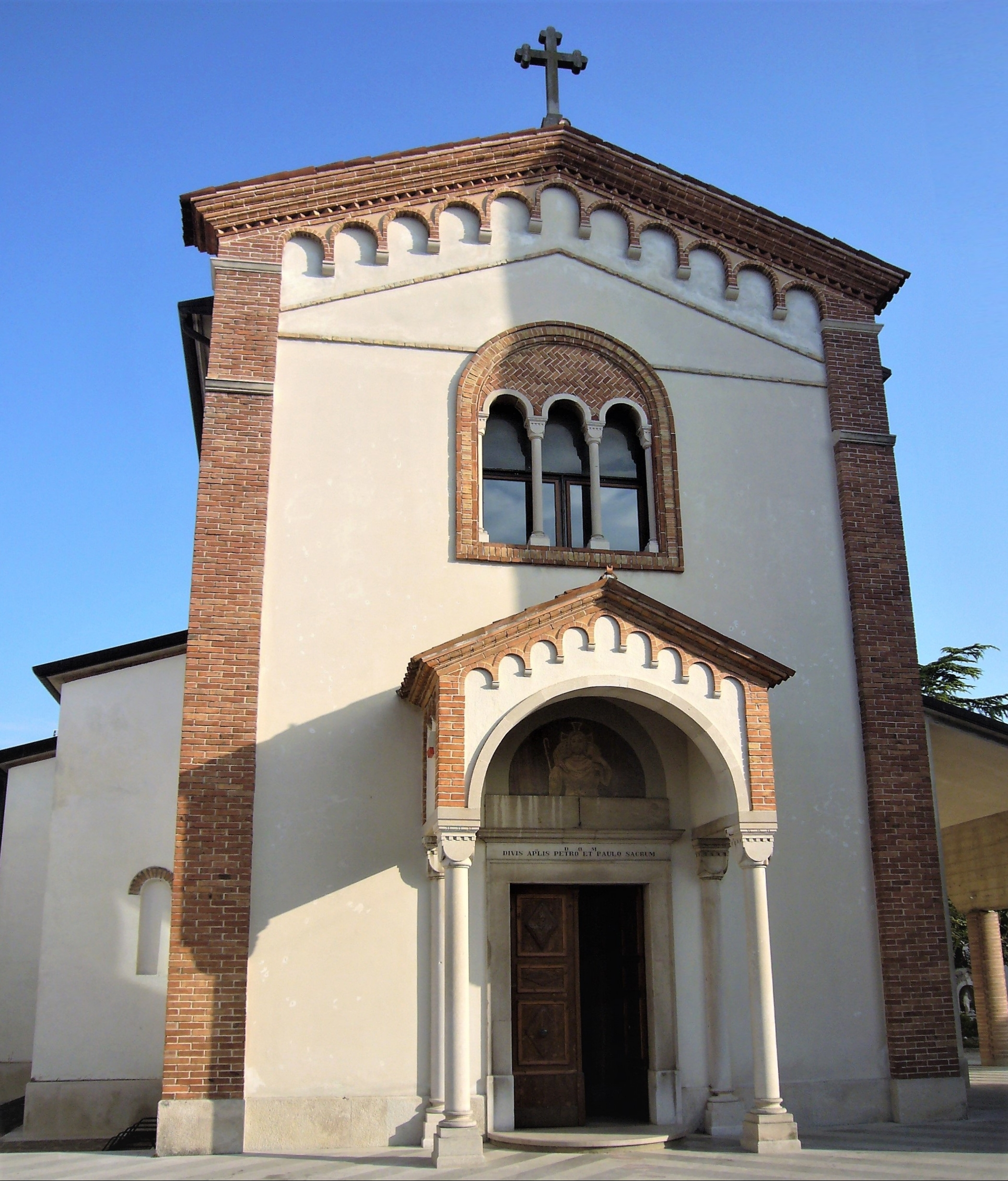

- Location within Italy Location within Friuli-Venezia Giulia
- Coordinates: 45°48′N 13°30′E
- Country: Italy
- Region: Friuli-Venezia Giulia
- Province: Province of Gorizia (GO)
- Frazioni: Alberoni, Bistrigna, Dobbia, Lido di Staranzano, Quarantia, Villaraspa, Le Coloschie, Bosco Grande, Bonifica del Brancolo, Punta Sdobba

Government
  - Mayor: Marco Fragiacomo

Area
  - Total: 18.7 km^{2} (7.2 sq mi)
- Elevation: 7 m (23 ft)

Population (July 2025)
  - Total: 7,133
  - Density: 381/km^{2} (988/sq mi)
- Demonym: Staranzanesi
- Time zone: UTC+1 (CET)
  - Summer (DST): UTC+2 (CEST)
- Postal code: 34079
- Dialing code: 0481
- Website: Official website

Staranzano (Friulian and Bisiacco: Staranzan; Slovene: Štarancan) is a comune (municipality) in the Regional decentralization entity of Gorizia in the Italian region of Friuli-Venezia Giulia, located about 30 kilometres (19 mi) northwest of Trieste and about 15 kilometres (9 mi) southwest of Gorizia. As of 31 July 2025, it had a population of 7,133 and an area of 18.7 square kilometres (7.2 mi^{2}). The municipality of Staranzano contains the frazioni (boroughs) of Alberoni, Bistrigna, Dobbia, Lido di Staranzano, Quarantia, Villaraspa, Le Coloschie, Bosco Grande, Bonifica del Broncolo and Punta Sdobba.

Staranzano borders the following municipalities: Grado, Monfalcone, Ronchi dei Legionari, San Canzian d'Isonzo.

== Demographic evolution ==
Historical population

| Year | Pop. | ±% |
|---|---|---|
| 1861 | ? | — |
| 1871 | ? | — |
| 1881 | ? | — |
| 1901 | ? | — |
| 1911 | ? | — |
| 1921 | 1,373 | — |

| Year | Pop. | ±% |
|---|---|---|
| 1931 | 2,031 | +47.9% |
| 1936 | 2,415 | +18.9% |
| 1951 | 3,023 | +25.2% |
| 1961 | 3,293 | +8.9% |
| 1971 | 3,957 | +20.2% |
| 1981 | 5,526 | +39.7% |

| Year | Pop. | ±% |
|---|---|---|
| 1991 | 5,980 | +8.2% |
| 2001 | 6,642 | +11.1% |
| 2011 | 7,199 | +8.4% |
| 2021 | 7,246 | +0.7% |

Source: Data from ISTAT
