= Turkey national baseball team =

Information
- Country: Turkey
- Confederation: WBSC Europe
- Manager: Şahin Kömürcü

WBSC ranking
- Current: NR (26 October 2026)

The Turkey national baseball team is the national baseball team for Turkey. They are a contender for the European Baseball Championship and haven't competed in the Baseball World Cup. The Federation was created at the end of 2008 and at the beginning of 2009.

== Results ==
=== European Baseball Championship ===
2021 European Baseball Championship Qualifier:

Belarus 31-2 Turkey (5 innings)

Switzerland 30-7 Turkey (5 innings)

Russia 24-0 Turkey (5 innings)

Slovenia 18-2 Turkey (5 innings)

=== European Juveniles Baseball Championship (U12) ===
- 2009 : 9th
