= Estonia national baseball team =

Information
- Country: Estonia
- Federation: Estonian Baseball Federation
- Confederation: WBSC Europe

WBSC ranking
- Current: NR (26 March 2026)

The Estonia national baseball team is the national baseball team of Estonia. The team represents Estonia in international competitions. The team is formed from players from the three Estonian baseball teams, the Keila Pitbulls, Keila Sox, and the Kiili Pantriid.
