= 1955 European Baseball Championship =

Tournament details
- Country: Spain
- City: Barcelona
- Dates: 10–15 July
- Teams: 5
- Defending champions: Italy

Final positions
- Champions: Spain (1st title)
- Runners-up: Belgium
- Third place: West Germany
- Fourth place: Italy

Tournament statistics
- Games played: 10

Awards
- MVP: (Spain) José Luis Bernardo

The 1955 European Baseball Championship was held in Barcelona, Spain and was won by Spain. Belgium finished as runner-up. Five teams competed in the tournament, with France joining the four teams that competed in the previous edition in 1954.

The format for the tournament had also changed. Instead of a knockout tournament, which was the 1954 championship's format, it was a round-robin tournament played over five days from July 10 to 15.

By winning the tournament, Spain qualified for the 1955 Global World Series. However, the Spanish organizers incurred a debt of 150,000 pesetas organizing the event, which was not paid off by the 1960 championship, also held in Barcelona.

== Results ==
=== Standings ===
Pos.	Teams	W	D	L	P	R	RA
1	Spain	3	1	0	7	32	3
2	Belgium	3	0	1	6	23	9
3	Germany	2	0	2	4	12	27
4	Italy	1	1	2	3	24	15
5	France	0	0	4	0	12	61

=== Matches ===
1955	Belgium	10–2	West Germany

1955	Spain	21–3	France

1955	Belgium	9–4	Italy

1955	Spain	9–0	West Germany

1955	Belgium	4–1	France

1955	West Germany	5–4	Italy

1955	West Germany	5–4	France

1955	Spain	0–0	Italy

1955	Italy	16–1	France

1955	Spain	2–0	Belgium

== Awards ==
- Most valuable player and best pitcher: (Spain) José Luis Bernardo
- Best hitter: (Spain) Juan Casals
- Best umpire: (Italy) Alfio D'aprile
