= 2007 European Baseball Championship =

Tournament details
- Country: Spain
- Venues: 3 (in 1 host city)
- Dates: 7 – 16 September 2007
- Teams: 12
- Defending champions: Netherlands

Final positions
- Champions: Netherlands (20th title)
- Runners-up: Great Britain
- Third place: Spain
- Fourth place: Germany

Tournament statistics
- Games played: 42
- Attendance: 19,456 (463 per game)
- Best BA: (United Kingdom) Brant Ust (.600)
- Most HRs: (Netherlands) Raylinos Legito (2)
- Most SBs: (Netherlands) Roger Bernadina (4)
- Best ERA: (France) Nicolas Dubaut (0.00)

Awards
- MVP: (United Kingdom) Brant Ust

The 2007 European Baseball Championship was an international baseball tournament held from September 7 to 16, between national baseball teams of the Confederation of European Baseball. The tournament was held in Barcelona, Spain and served as a qualifying competition for the 2008 Summer Olympics. The Netherlands won the tournament for the fifth consecutive time and qualified for the Olympics in Beijing. Great Britain and Spain advanced to a final qualifying tournament in Taiwan. Prior to the tournament, Greece was removed by the European Baseball Confederation and replaced with Austria. Czech Republic was downgraded to last place at the end of the tournament and its wins in the preliminary round vacated due to the use of ineligible players. This was the first time that five teams, rather than two, were relegated to the B-Pool.

== Round 1 ==
=== Pool A ===
==== Standings ====
| Qualified for Pool C |
| Did not qualify for Pool C |

| Teams | W | L | Pct. | GB |
|---|---|---|---|---|
| Netherlands | 5 | 0 | 1.000 | - |
| Germany | 4 | 1 | .800 | 1 |
| Sweden | 3 | 2 | .600 | 2 |
| Czech Republic | 2 | 3 | .400 | 3 |
| Croatia | 1 | 4 | .200 | 4 |
| Austria | 0 | 5 | .000 | 5 |

==== Schedule ====
| September 8, 2007 | Sweden | 1 – 9 | Germany | Viladecans, Spain; Attendance: 250 |
| September 8, 2007 | | Boxscore | | Viladecans, Spain; Attendance: 250 |

| September 8, 2007 | Czech Republic | 4 – 1 (Forfeit) | Croatia | Sant Boi, Spain; Attendance: 150 |
| September 8, 2007 | | Boxscore | | Sant Boi, Spain; Attendance: 150 |

| September 8, 2007 | Austria | 0 – 22 (F/5) | Netherlands | Viladecans, Spain; Attendance: 300 |
| September 8, 2007 | | Boxscore | | Viladecans, Spain; Attendance: 300 |

| September 9, 2007 | Croatia | 2 – 11 | Sweden | Montjuïc, Spain; Attendance: 400 |
| September 9, 2007 | | Boxscore | | Montjuïc, Spain; Attendance: 400 |

| September 9, 2007 | Germany | 10 – 0 (F/7) | Austria | Sant Boi, Spain; Attendance: 102 |
| September 9, 2007 | | Boxscore | | Sant Boi, Spain; Attendance: 102 |

| September 9, 2007 | Netherlands | 11 – 0 (F/7) | Czech Republic | Viladecans, Spain; Attendance: 400 |
| September 9, 2007 | | Boxscore | | Viladecans, Spain; Attendance: 400 |

| September 10, 2007 | Netherlands | 14 – 2 (F/7) | Sweden | Montjuïc, Spain; Attendance: 106 |
| September 10, 2007 | | Boxscore | | Montjuïc, Spain; Attendance: 106 |

| September 10, 2007 | Czech Republic | 6 – 2 (Forfeit) | Austria | Viladecans, Spain; Attendance: 150 |
| September 10, 2007 | | Boxscore | | Viladecans, Spain; Attendance: 150 |

| September 10, 2007 | Germany | 8 – 7 | Croatia | Viladecans, Spain; Attendance: 303 |
| September 10, 2007 | | Boxscore | | Viladecans, Spain; Attendance: 303 |

| September 11, 2007 | Netherlands | 6 – 3 | Germany | Montjuïc, Spain; Attendance: 350 |
| September 11, 2007 | | Boxscore | | Montjuïc, Spain; Attendance: 350 |

| September 11, 2007 | Austria | 3 – 8 | Croatia | Viladecans, Spain; Attendance: 300 |
| September 11, 2007 | | Boxscore | | Viladecans, Spain; Attendance: 300 |

| September 11, 2007 | Czech Republic | 1 – 2 | Sweden | Montjuïc, Spain; Attendance: 200 |
| September 11, 2007 | | Boxscore | | Montjuïc, Spain; Attendance: 200 |

| September 12, 2007 | Germany | 6 – 1 | Czech Republic | Montjuïc, Spain; Attendance: 500 |
| September 12, 2007 | | Boxscore | | Montjuïc, Spain; Attendance: 500 |

| September 12, 2007 | Croatia | 0 – 13 (F/7) | Netherlands | Viladecans, Spain; Attendance: 250 |
| September 12, 2007 | | Boxscore | | Viladecans, Spain; Attendance: 250 |

| September 12, 2007 | Sweden | 4 – 1 | Austria | Viladecans, Spain; Attendance: 105 |
| September 12, 2007 | | Boxscore | | Viladecans, Spain; Attendance: 105 |

=== Pool B ===
==== Standings ====
| Qualified for Pool C |
| Did not qualify for Pool C |

| Teams | W | L | Pct. | GB | Tiebreaker |
|---|---|---|---|---|---|
| Great Britain | 4 | 1 | 0.800 | - | 1-0 |
| Spain | 4 | 1 | 0.800 | - | 0-1 |
| France | 3 | 2 | 0.600 | 1 | 1-0 |
| Italy | 3 | 2 | 0.600 | 1 | 0-1 |
| Ukraine | 1 | 4 | 0.200 | 3 | – |
| Russia | 0 | 5 | 0.000 | 4 | – |

==== Schedule ====
| September 7, 2007 | Great Britain | 12 – 8 | Spain | Montjuïc, Spain; Attendance: 2,500 |
| September 7, 2007 | | Boxscore | | Montjuïc, Spain; Attendance: 2,500 |

| September 8, 2007 | Ukraine | 0 – 13 | Italy | Montjuïc, Spain; Attendance: 100 |
| September 8, 2007 | | Boxscore | | Montjuïc, Spain; Attendance: 100 |

| September 8, 2007 | France | 4 – 2 | Russia | Montjuïc, Spain; Attendance: 400 |
| September 8, 2007 | | Boxscore | | Montjuïc, Spain; Attendance: 400 |

| September 9, 2007 | Spain | 5 – 4 | Ukraine | Viladecans, Spain; Attendance: 400 |
| September 9, 2007 | | Boxscore | | Viladecans, Spain; Attendance: 400 |

| September 9, 2007 | Italy | 1 – 5 | France | Montjuïc, Spain; Attendance: 750 |
| September 9, 2007 | | Boxscore | | Montjuïc, Spain; Attendance: 750 |

| September 9, 2007 | Russia | 7 – 10 | Great Britain | Sant Boi, Spain; Attendance: 500 |
| September 9, 2007 | | Boxscore | | Sant Boi, Spain; Attendance: 500 |

| September 10, 2007 | France | 6 – 2 | Ukraine | Sant Boi, Spain; Attendance: 71 |
| September 10, 2007 | | Boxscore | | Sant Boi, Spain; Attendance: 71 |

| September 10, 2007 | Spain | 4 – 0 | Russia | Viladecans, Spain; Attendance: 600 |
| September 10, 2007 | | Boxscore | | Viladecans, Spain; Attendance: 600 |

| September 10, 2007 | Italy | 6 – 0 | Great Britain | Montjuïc, Spain; Attendance: 200 |
| September 10, 2007 | | Boxscore | | Montjuïc, Spain; Attendance: 200 |

| September 11, 2007 | France | 3 – 4 | Great Britain | Sant Boi, Spain; Attendance: 303 |
| September 11, 2007 | | Boxscore | | Sant Boi, Spain; Attendance: 303 |

| September 11, 2007 | Ukraine | 4 – 3 (F/11) | Russia | Sant Boi, Spain; Attendance: 56 |
| September 11, 2007 | | Boxscore | | Sant Boi, Spain; Attendance: 56 |

| September 11, 2007 | Italy | 4 – 6 | Spain | Viladecans, Spain; Attendance: 1,200 |
| September 11, 2007 | | Boxscore | | Viladecans, Spain; Attendance: 1,200 |

| September 12, 2007 | Russia | 2 – 7 | Italy | Viladecans, Spain; Attendance: 300 |
| September 12, 2007 | | Boxscore | | Viladecans, Spain; Attendance: 300 |

| September 12, 2007 | Great Britain | 9 – 0 | Ukraine | Sant Boi, Spain; Attendance: 500 |
| September 12, 2007 | | Boxscore | | Sant Boi, Spain; Attendance: 500 |

| September 12, 2007 | Spain | 6 – 2 | France | Montjuïc, Spain; Attendance: 850 |
| September 12, 2007 | | Boxscore | | Montjuïc, Spain; Attendance: 850 |

=== Classification games ===
==== 11th/12th place ====
| September 13, 2007 | Russia | 7 – 2 | Austria | Sant Boi, Spain; Attendance: 100 |
| September 13, 2007 | | Boxscore | | Sant Boi, Spain; Attendance: 100 |

==== 9th/10th place ====
| September 13, 2007 | Ukraine | 1 – 2 | Croatia | Viladecans, Spain; Attendance: 250 |
| September 13, 2007 | | Boxscore | | Viladecans, Spain; Attendance: 250 |

==== 7th/8th place ====
| September 13, 2007 | Czech Republic | 2 – 7 | Italy | Montjuïc, Spain; Attendance: 300 |
| September 13, 2007 | | Boxscore | | Montjuïc, Spain; Attendance: 300 |

=== Pool C ===
==== Standings ====
| Teams | W | L | Pct. | GB | Tiebreaker |
|---|---|---|---|---|---|
| Netherlands | 5 | 0 | 1.000 | – | – |
| Great Britain | 3 | 2 | .600 | 2 | 1-1 (7.50 RA/9) |
| Spain | 3 | 2 | .600 | 2 | 1-1 (7.50 RA/9) |
| Germany | 3 | 2 | .600 | 2 | 1-1 (9.00 RA/9) |
| France | 1 | 4 | .200 | 4 | – |
| Sweden | 0 | 5 | .000 | 5 | – |

==== Schedule ====
| September 14, 2007 | Sweden | 7 – 10 | Great Britain | Viladecans, Spain; Attendance: 100 |
| September 14, 2007 | | Boxscore | | Viladecans, Spain; Attendance: 100 |

| September 14, 2007 | Netherlands | 18 – 0 (F/7) | France | Montjuïc, Spain; Attendance: 1,000 |
| September 14, 2007 | | Boxscore | | Montjuïc, Spain; Attendance: 1,000 |

| September 14, 2007 | Germany | 3 – 11 | Spain | Montjuïc, Spain; Attendance: 1,000 |
| September 14, 2007 | | Boxscore | | Montjuïc, Spain; Attendance: 1,000 |

| September 15, 2007 | Sweden | 0 – 10 (F/7) | France | Montjuïc, Spain; Attendance: 200 |
| September 15, 2007 | | Boxscore | | Montjuïc, Spain; Attendance: 200 |

| September 15, 2007 | Great Britain | 5 – 7 | Germany | Viladecans, Spain; Attendance: 200 |
| September 15, 2007 | | Boxscore | | Viladecans, Spain; Attendance: 200 |

| September 15, 2007 | Spain | 8 – 10 (F/11) | Netherlands | Viladecans, Spain; Attendance: 2,000 |
| September 15, 2007 | | Boxscore | | Viladecans, Spain; Attendance: 2,000 |

| September 16, 2007 | Germany | 7 – 1 | France | Viladecans, Spain; Attendance: 100 |
| September 16, 2007 | | Boxscore | | Viladecans, Spain; Attendance: 100 |

| September 16, 2007 | Netherlands | 6 – 1 | Great Britain | Montjuïc, Spain; Attendance: 500 |
| September 16, 2007 | | Boxscore | | Montjuïc, Spain; Attendance: 500 |

| September 16, 2007 | Sweden | 5 – 8 | Spain | Viladecans, Spain; Attendance: 1,200 |
| September 16, 2007 | | Boxscore | | Viladecans, Spain; Attendance: 1,200 |

== Final standings ==
| Rk | Team |
|---|---|
| 1 | Netherlands |
| 2 | Great Britain |
| 3 | Spain |
| 4 | Germany |
| 5 | France |
| 6 | Sweden |
Failed to qualify for Pool C
| 7 | Italy |
| 8 | Croatia |
| 9 | Ukraine |
| 10 | Russia |
| 11 | Austria |
Originally placed 8th
| 12 | Czech Republic |

2007 European Baseball Championship

Netherlands
20th title

== Awards ==
The CEB announced the following awards at the completion of the tournament.

All Star Team
| Position | Player |
|---|---|
| Pitcher (RHP) | (Netherlands) David Bergman |
| Pitcher (LHP) | (Germany) Enorbel Márquez-Ramirez |
| Catcher | (United Kingdom) Mike Nickeas |
| First Base | (United Kingdom) Ian Young |
| Second Base | (Netherlands) Yurendell DeCaster |
| Third Base | (Netherlands) Raylinos Legito |
| Shortstop | (United Kingdom) Brant Ust |
| Outfield | (Netherlands) Roger Bernadina |
| Outfield | (Spain) Daniel Figueroa |
| Outfield | (Germany) Sasha Lutz |
| Designated Hitter | (Netherlands) Sharnol Adriana |

== Attendance ==
- Total Attendance: 19,546
- Average Attendance: 465

== See also ==
- Baseball at the 2008 Summer Olympics - Qualification
