= Ukraine national baseball team =

National sports team

Ukraine National Baseball Team

Information
- Country: Ukraine
- Federation: Federation Baseball & Softball of Ukraine
- Confederation: WBSC Europe
- Manager: Oleg Boyko

WBSC ranking
- Current: 74 ▼1 (26 October 2026)

European Championship
- Appearances: 8 (first in 1995)
- Best result: 9th

The Ukraine National Baseball Team is the national baseball team of Ukraine and is controlled by the Federation Baseball Softball Ukraine. The team represents Ukraine in international competitions and competes in the European Baseball Championship. The team has not yet placed in the championship.

== Placings ==
European Baseball Championship

- 1995: 9th, head coach Viktor Pianykh
- 1997: 11th, head coach Oleh Boyko
- 1999: did not qualify
- 2001: 11th, head coach Boyko
- 2003: did not qualify
- 2005: 10th, head coach Boyko
- 2007: 9th, head coach Boyko
- 2010: 11th
- 2012: did not qualify
- 2014: did not qualify
- 2016: did not qualify
- 2019: did not qualify
- 2021: 13th
- 2023: 14th
- 2025: did not qualify
