= Austria national baseball team =

Information
- Country: Austria
- Federation: Austrian Baseball Softball Federation
- Confederation: Confederation of European Baseball
- Manager: Paul-Anthony Bennett

WBSC ranking
- Current: 27 (26 March 2026)

The Austria national baseball team is the national baseball team of Austria. The team competes in the bi-annual European Baseball Championship. The coaching staff consists of Head Coach Hiroyuki Sakanashi from Japan, Pitching Coach Anthony Bennett from the United States and Assistant David Brandt from the United States.

== Placings ==
European Baseball Championship

- 2007 : 11th
- Qualification 2011 : 2nd
- Qualification 2013 : 2nd
- Qualification 2015 : 2nd
- Qualification 2017 : 1st
- 2019 : 10th of 12.
- 2021 : 11th of 16.
- 2023 : 15th of 16.
- 2025 : 9th of 16.

European Under-21 Baseball Championship

- 2006 : 7th
- 2014 : 2nd

European Junior Baseball Championship

- 1993 : 12th
- 1997 : 9th
- 2001 : 7th
- 2003 : 9th

European Cadets Baseball Championship

- 1997 : 6th
- 1999 : 6th
- 2002 : 9th
- 2004 : 8th
- 2006 : 6th
- 2007 : 4th
- 2008 : 6th
- 2009 : 6th
- 2010 : 8th

European Juveniles Baseball Championship

- 2006 : 5th
- 2007 : 5th
- 2008 : 6th
- 2009 : 4th
- 2010 : 4th

== See also ==
- Baseball awards § Austria
- Baseball awards § Europe
- Baseball in Austria (German Wikipedia)
- Austrian Baseball League (German Wikipedia)
