= Bulgaria national baseball team =

Bulgaria National Baseball Team

Information
- Country: Bulgaria
- Federation: Bulgarian Baseball and Softball Federation
- Confederation: WBSC Europe

WBSC ranking
- Current: 83 (26 March 2026)

The Bulgaria national baseball team is the national baseball team of Bulgaria. The team represents Bulgaria in international competitions. Their best performance is reaching the quarter-finals stage, and achieving 6th place in the 2006 European Under-21 Baseball Championships.

Another success of the Bulgaria national baseball team is that the team is a five-time Balkan champion.

== Roster ==
Bulgaria's roster for Baseball European Championship B Pool 2024 - Group Ireland

Bulgaria national baseball team roster
Players		Coaches
Pitchers: 28 Stefan Beshkov; 5 Evgenii Chernozemsky; 25 Teodor Dimitrov; 10 Dimitar Nassapov; 22 Martin Shopski; 7 Panayot Zhaltov	Catchers: 11 Yoanis Asenov Aleksandrov; 10 Dimitar Nassapov; 99 Martin Zhelev; Infielders: 11 Yoanis Asenov Aleksandrov; 28 Stefan Beshkov; 5 Evgenii Chernozemsky; 25 Teodor Dimitrov; 4 Kaloyan Stoyanov; 1 Kristiyan Todorov; 7 Panayot Zhaltov; 99 Martin Zhelev; Outfielders: 28 Stefan Beshkov; 39 Zdravko Blagoev; 33 Teodor Karakashev; 13 Nikolay Karashtranov; 55 Nikolay Mutafchiev; 22 Martin Shopski; 4 Kaloyan Stoyanov; 21 Alex Yonin; 7 Panayot Zhaltov; 99 Martin Zhelev	Coaches: 28 Stefan Beshkov

== Tournament results ==
European Under-21 Baseball Championship

- 2006 : Quarter-finals (6th)
