= Belarus national baseball team =

Information
- Country: Belarus
- Federation: Belarus Baseball Association
- Confederation: WBSC Europe

WBSC ranking
- Current: NR (26 March 2026)

The Belarus national baseball team is the national baseball team of Belarus. The team competed in the bi-annual European Baseball Championship. In reaction to the 2022 Russian invasion of Ukraine, WBSC Europe excluded Belarusian teams from all its competitions for both national and club teams to be held in Europe in 2022.

== Tournament results ==
European Youth Baseball Championship

- 2007 : 7th

European Juveniles Baseball Championship

- 2006 : 6th
