= Serbia national baseball team =

Information
- Country: Serbia
- Federation: Serbian Baseball Association
- Confederation: WBSC Europe
- Manager: John Vodenlich

WBSC ranking
- Current: 74 ▼1 (26 October 2026)

The Serbia national baseball team represents Serbia in international baseball competitions.

== History ==
The first recorded baseball game in Serbia was played in 1935, during the halftime of a football match between the BSK Belgrade and Hajduk Split in Belgrade. (Note: A similar game to baseball known as Shora was reportedly played in the area of Banat prior to the arrival of baseball in Yugoslavia in the 1910s.) The first Serbian baseball club was formed in the late 80s as part of the JSD Partizan society, (Note: Sources report the club's founding as early as 1987, and as late as 1989, with most generally agreeing on 1988.) with their first match being in late May 1989 against Varaždin 1181 in Belgrade, the first recorded match there since 1935. BK Partizan played in the second tier of the Yugoslavian baseball league until the breakup of Yugoslavia. With the breakup of Yugoslavia, in order to maintain baseball's continued domestic survival, BK Partizan split into two teams, leading to the formation of BK Kings, based in Košutnjak. Alongside BK Dogs, based in Batajnica, BK Sleepers, based in Kragujevac (otherwise known at the time as the 'American Embassy' team), (Note: Since then, a new baseball club had formed known as USA Team, consisting of the kids of the workers at the American Embassy.) and BK Orlovi, the national league of what was now Serbia and Montenegro (FR Yugoslavia) continued from 1993 on, with its national team forming in 1994, and the Yugoslavian Baseball Federation (now Serbian Baseball Federation) being founded the same year.

The Yugoslavian Baseball Federation was admitted to the International Baseball Federation in 1995, and the Confederation of European Baseball in 1996. That same year, the national team participated in the B-group European Baseball Championship in Great Britain, recording five defeats. BK Kings and BK Dogs would merge into BK Beograd '96, and would help record the national team's first victory against Lithuania in 1998 on the B-group European Championships in Stockerau, Austria, finishing the championship with three victories and one defeat.

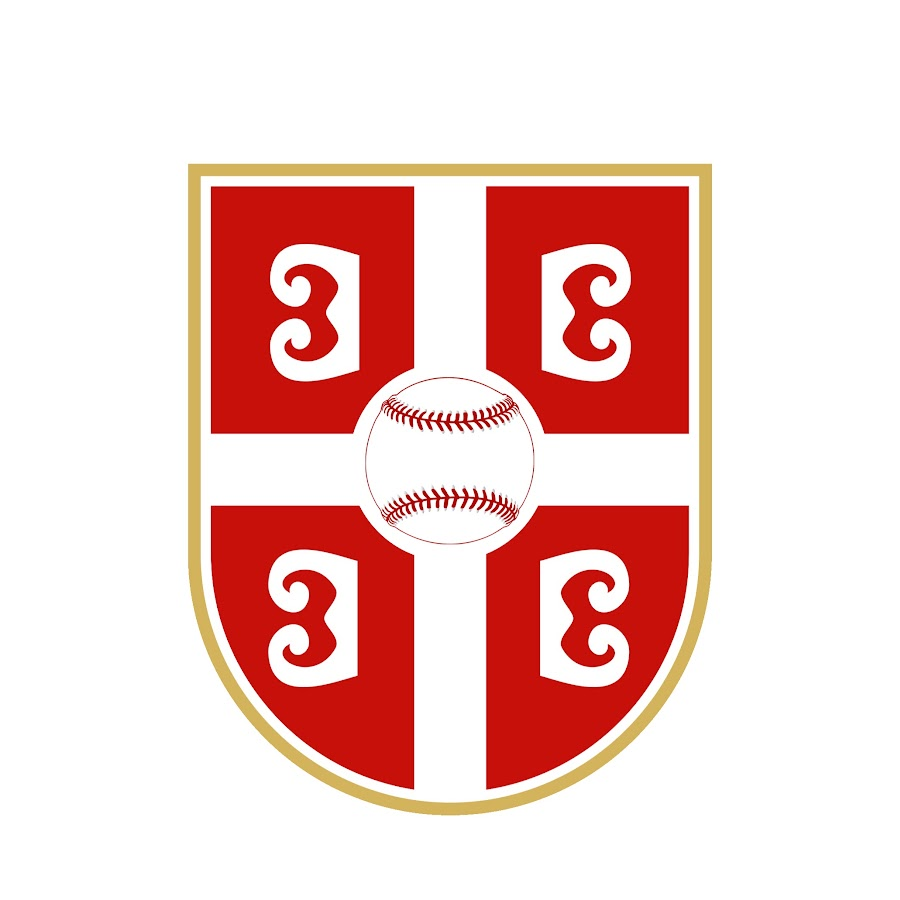
Serbian Baseball Logo

The first dedicated baseball field in Serbia was built in 2001 on the Ada Ciganlija recreational ground in Belgrade, which helped the development of the sport. Some have since called for another court to be built in Novi Sad. By September 2017, at least 10 baseball clubs were playing nationally, with others having come and gone since. (Note: One such team would be the first Roma baseball team in Serbia, BK Čirikli.)

The best performance of the national team since 1998 was achieved in the 2004 B-group championship in Germany, taking the fourth place. In the next two B-group championships, the team did not fare well. Afterward, Serbia won the 2016 C-group European Baseball Championship in Slovenia, thus qualifying for the B group, its best performance since 2004. Along with Poland, it hosted the B group European Championship in Belgrade, on 24–29 July 2017. In 2022, along with Bulgaria and Lithuania, it hosted the European Baseball Championship Qualifiers in Belgrade. Domestically, in 2020, Beograd '96 would be crowned national champions for the 20th time.

Serbia national baseball team – European Baseball Championship Qualifier 2024 roster
Players		Coaches
Pitchers: 19 Christian Bokich; 6 Sava Dupor; 32 Nikolas Jukovic; 10 Dusan Karic; 28 Aleksandar Vlaisavic	Catchers: 2 Danilo Cvijović; 24 Jovan Filipović; Infielders: 99 Marko Badovinac; 33 Jose Ceballos; 3 Uros Culum; 5 Draza Dupor; 13 Dusan Milovanovic; 1 Bojan Ninic; 16 Nikola Vasic; 36 Nick Van Kooten; 72 Alex Rivera; 41 William Neese; Outfielders: 37 Slobodan Bogdanovic; 7 Strahinja Boskovic; 17 Dusan Nakic; 21 Alen Pantelic; 11 Andrej Stefanovic; 45 Predrag Kukoleca	Manager: 64 John Vodenlich (Manager / Head Coach); Coaches: 55 Greg Fetherston (1st Base Coach); — Nick Mitrovic (Coach); 22 Bill Anderson (Bench Coach)

== Tournament results ==
European Baseball Championship - B-Pool

- 1996: 10th
- 1998: 15th
- 2000 (Group A) : 6th
- 2002 (Group B) : 8th
- 2004 : 4th
- 2008 (Group 3) : 5th
- 2017 (Group 2) : 4th
- 2019 (Group 2) : 4th
- 2022: 4th

European Under-21 Baseball Championship

- 2006 : 8th
