= Slovakia national baseball team =

Slovak national baseball team

Information
- Country: Slovakia
- Federation: Slovak Baseball Federation
- Confederation: Confederation of European Baseball
- Manager: Matej Šišolák

WBSC ranking
- Current: 45 (26 October 2026)

The Slovak national baseball team is the national baseball team of Slovakia. The team competes in the biennial European Baseball Championship. The team is controlled by the Slovak Baseball Federation, which is represented in the Confederation of European Baseball. Current in IBAF World Rankings is 39th (June 2016).

== Roster ==
Slovakia's roster for the European Baseball Championship Qualifier 2022, the last official competition in which the team took part.

Slovakia national baseball team – European Baseball Championship Qualifier 2022 roster
Players		Coaches
Pitchers: 15 Juraj Bartók; 12 Martin Gieci; 6 Matej Grendža-Donský; 5 Samuel Holekši; 19 Jakub Ižold; 9 Daniel Just; 22 Michal Puškár; 17 Matej Škerlec; 16 Marko Vykoukal; 4 Adam Zacko	Catchers: 4 Mário Gottchall; 11 Matej Rudohradský; Infielders: 10 Martin Brunegraf; 4 Mário Gottchall; 6 Matej Grendža-Donský; 9 Daniel Just; 8 Denis Pakši; 17 Matej Škerlec; Outfielders: 18 Andrej Jankovič	Manager: 2 Matej Šišolák; Coaches: 8 Marián Mikš; -- Dušan Nitschneider

== Tournament results ==
European Baseball Championship B division

- 1990 : 3rd (aka CSFR)
- 1992 : 2nd (aka CSFR)
- 1994 : 12th
- 1996 : 5th
- 1998 : 10th
- 2000 : 5th in group A
- 2002 : 2nd in group B
- 2004 : 4th in group A

Qualification to European Baseball Championship

- 2007 : 5th in group 2
- 2010 : 3rd in group 1

European Junior Baseball Championship

- 2007 : 7th
- 2009 : 9th

European Youth Baseball Championship

- 2006 : 8th
- 2007 : 6th
- 2008 : 7th
- 2009 : 7th

European Juveniles Baseball Championship

- 2006 : 7th
- 2009 : 6th
- 2010 : 5th
