= Lithuania national baseball team =

Information
- Country: Lithuania
- Federation: Lithuanian Baseball Association
- Confederation: WBSC Europe
- Manager: William Gordon

WBSC ranking
- Current: 44 (26 March 2026)

European Championship
- Appearances: 1 (first in 2025)
- Best result: 15th (2025)

The Lithuania national baseball team is the national baseball team of Lithuania. The team currently competes in the Pool B of the European Baseball Championship.

== History ==
Baseball was introduced in Lithuania by Lithuanian American pilot Steponas Darius in 1922, after returning from the United States.

The team played in the 2019 European Baseball Championship - B-Pool in early July 2019 in Trnava, Slovakia, winning its group and advancing to the playoffs against Israel in the 2019 Playoff Series at the end of July 2019 for the last qualifying spot for the 2019 European Baseball Championship.

Israel won the first two games in a best-of-three series against Lithuania in Utena.

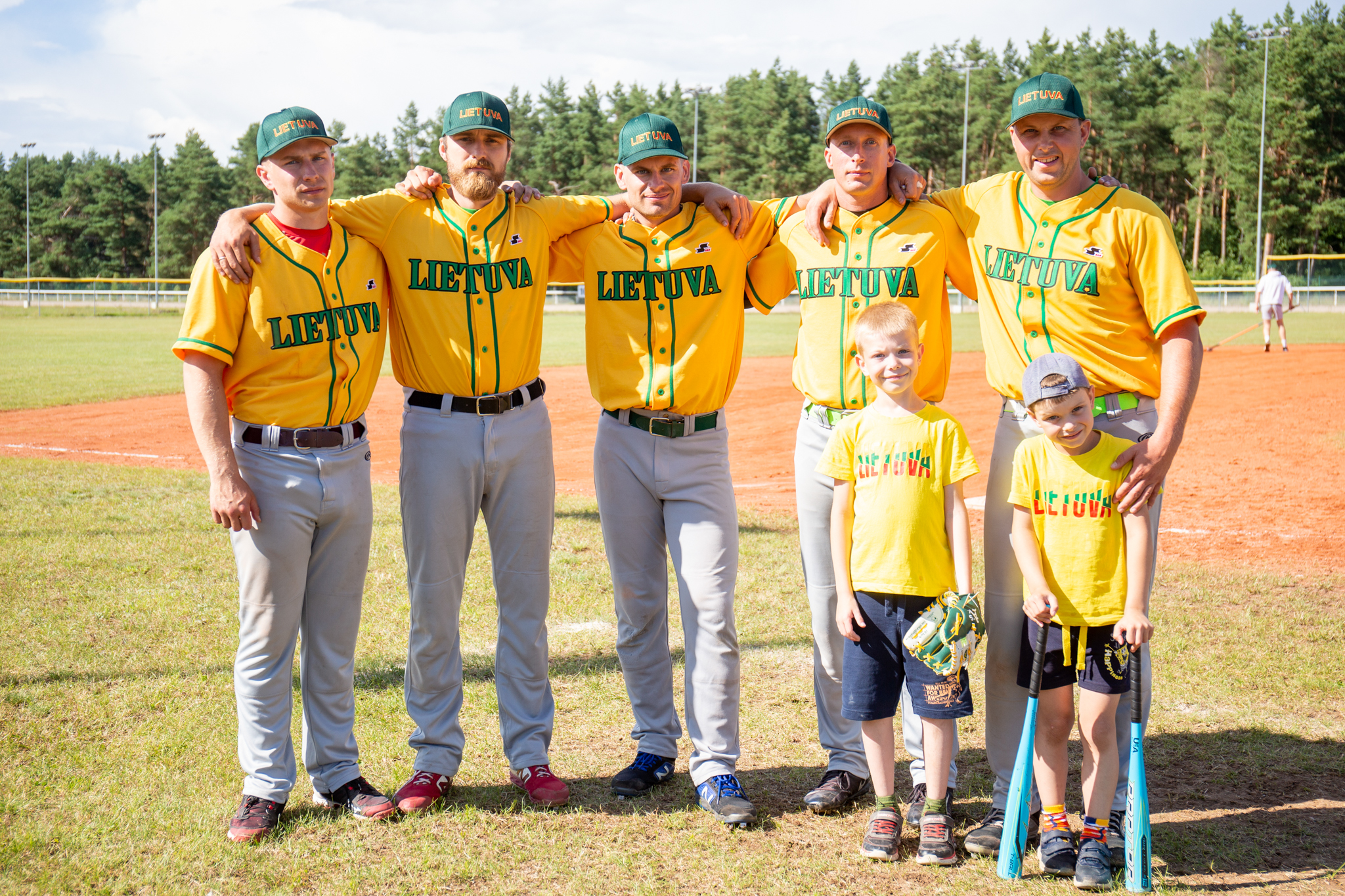
Lithuania players in 2022

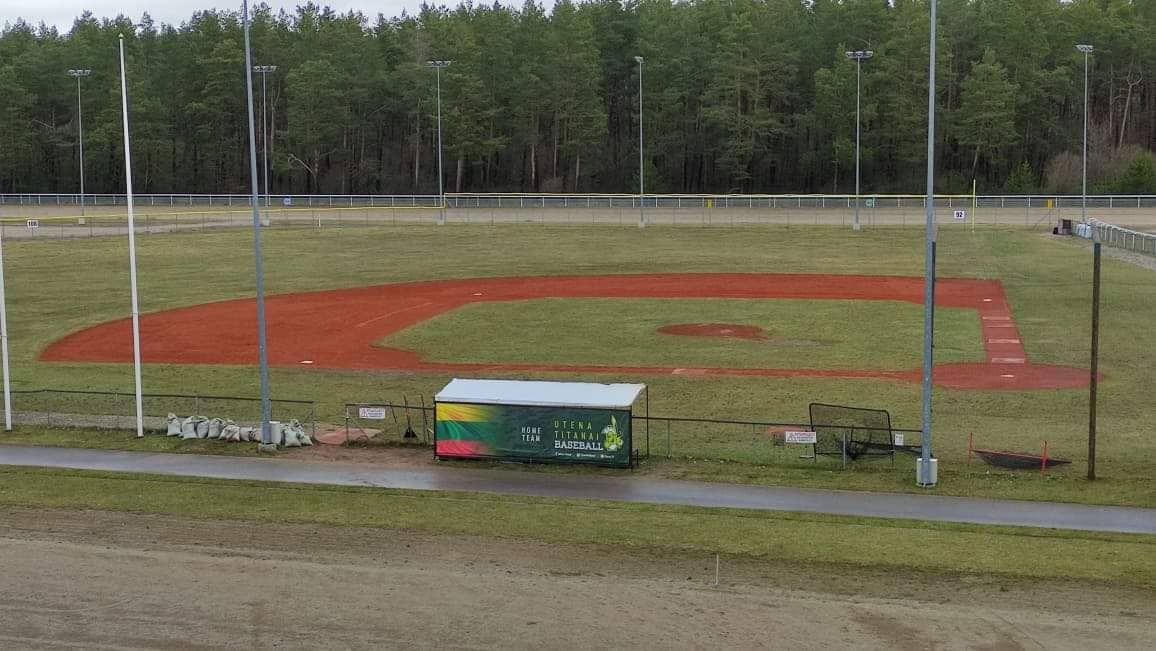
Baseball diamond in the Utena Hippodrome

== Roster ==
Lithuania's roster for the European Baseball Championship Qualifier 2022, the last official competition in which the team took part.

Lithuania national baseball team – European Baseball Championship Qualifier 2022 roster
Players		Coaches
Pitchers: 54 Marius Balandis; 47 Edvardas Matusevicius; 3 Gytis Morkunas; 23 Lukas Morkunas; 50 Dovydas Neverauskas; 26 Vilius Paikovas; 51 Andrius Stravinskas; 49 Tomas Valincius; 17 Eimantas Zickus	Catchers: 16 Adomas Jonas Aleksandravičius; Infielders: 32 Dankovskis Arunas; 38 Audrius Beliauskas; 55 Domas Kamandulis; 22 Lukas Pupininkas; 11 Martynas Sadzevicius; 24 Ignas Zinkevičius; Outfielders: 45 Mantas Aidukas; 43 Mantas Cernauskas; 48 Tomas Jankoitis; 39 Evaldas Remeika; 15 Justinas Sadaunikas; 28 Lukas Sirgedas; 58 Matas Sirgedas	Manager: William Gordon

== Tournament results ==
European Baseball Championship

- 2025 : 15th

European Youth Baseball Championship

- 2008 : 8th

European Cadet Baseball Championship

- 2013 : 5th
- 2014 : 4th

European Juveniles Baseball Championship

- 2007 : 4th
- 2008 : 5th
- 2009 : 5th
- 2010 : 3rd
- 2011 : 4th
- 2012 : 3rd
- 2013 : 2nd
- 2014 : 4th

European Junior Baseball Championship

- 2011 : 10th

European Under-21 Baseball Championship

- 2012 : 8th
- 2014 : 6th
- 2016 : Bronze

World University Baseball Championship

- 2008 : 7th

12U Baseball World Championship

- 2011 : 13th

15U Baseball World Cup

- 2012 : 14th
- 2014 : 18th
