= Russia national baseball team =

Information
- Country: Russia
- Federation: Russian Baseball and Softball Federation
- Confederation: WBSC Europe
- Manager: Vladimir Timakov

WBSC ranking
- Current: NR (26 October 2026)
- Highest: 23 (31 December 2016)

World Cup
- Appearances: 3
- Best result: 13th

Intercontinental Cup
- Appearances: 1
- Best result: 9th

European Championship
- Appearances: 13
- Best result: 2 (in 2001)

The Russia national baseball team is the national baseball team of Russia. The team competed in the European Baseball Championship and the Baseball World Cup. It is organized by the Russian Baseball and Softball Federation.

== History ==
Baseball was first played in Irkutsk, Russia in 1917, promoted by a YMCA secretary from Chicago. Lapta, a similar bat-and-ball sport, had been played in Russia since the 14th century. American baseball also depended on the hide of Russian Tartar horses for the cover for baseballs. American-born players drew sizable crowds in Moscow in the 1930s, though the sport was not promoted by the Soviet Union.

Japanese Baseball Hall of Famer Victor Starffin was born in Nizhny Tagil in 1916 before moving to Japan as a child and taking up the sport.

The national baseball team was formed in 1987, following the International Olympic Committee's decision to add baseball as an Olympic sport. The team began competing in the European Baseball Championship in 1991, playing in that tournament as the Soviet Union national team, with its best finish being a surprising second place finish in 2001. Pitcher Rinat Makhmoutov was named the most valuable player of the 2001 tournament.

Russia's head coach is Vladimir Timakov.

After the Russian invasion of Ukraine, the World Baseball Softball Confederation banned Russian athletes and officials. In addition, WBSC Europe relocated competitions that had been scheduled to be held in Russia during 2022, and excluded Russian teams from all its competitions for both national and club teams held in Europe in 2022.

== Placings ==
Baseball World Cup

- 1998 : 16th
- 2001 : 13th
- 2003 : 14th

Intercontinental Cup

- 1991 : 9th

European Baseball Championship

- 1991 : 6th
- 1993 : 8th
- 1995 : 8th
- 1997 : 4th
- 1999 : 4th
- 2001 : (silver) 2nd
- 2003 : 8th
- 2005 : 11th
- 2007 : 10th
- 2012 : 12th
- 2014 : 8th
- 2016 : 12th
- 2019 : Did not qualify
- 2021 : 10th
- 2023 and 2025 : not eligible to compete
