= 2023 European Baseball Championship – Qualification =

2023 European Baseball Championship Qualifying
Tournament details
- Countries: Serbia; Lithuania; Bulgaria
- Dates: July 12 – 17 2022
- Teams: 13

Tournament statistics
- Games played: 25

The 2023 European Baseball Championship Qualifying were baseball tournaments held from July 12 to 17, 2022, to determine the three additional countries that would qualify for the 2023 European Baseball Championship, in addition to the top 13 countries (excluding Russia) that automatically qualified in the 2021 European Baseball Championship. The qualifiers were held in Belgrade, Serbia; Utena, Lithuania; and Blagoevgrad, Bulgaria.

Russia, which finished 10th in the 2021 European Baseball Championship, lost its qualification due to Russian invasion of Ukraine.

As a result of the qualifiers, France, Hungary, and Switzerland advanced to the main tournament.

== Format ==
Previous format: The three winners of the three qualifying tournaments in 2022 would compete in a playoff tournament in the first half of 2023, with only two teams advancing to the European Championship.

Revised format: The three winners of the three qualifying tournaments in 2022 would advance to the 2023 European Baseball Championship.

== Groups ==
=== Grope Belgrade ===
Grope Belgrade took place at the Ada Ciganlija Baseball Field in Belgrade, Serbia, on July 12 to 17, 2022. Hungary defeated Slovakia to qualify for the European Championship.

==== Round robin ====
Pos	Team	Pld	W	L	RF	RA	PCT	GB	Qualification
1	Slovakia	4	3	1	52	24	.750	—	Final
2	Hungary	4	3	1	41	27	.750	—	Final
3	Norway	4	3	1	36	35	.750	—	
4	Serbia (H)	4	1	3	35	30	.250	2	
5	Poland	4	0	4	15	63	.000	3	

Source: WBSC Europe
(H) Hosts

Date	Local time	Road team	Score	Home team	Inn.	Venue	Game duration	Attendance	Boxscore
Jul 12, 2022	11:00	Slovakia	17–4	Norway	8	Ada Ciganlija Baseball Field	2:32	45	Boxscore
Jul 12, 2022	16:00	Serbia	18–5	Poland	7	Ada Ciganlija Baseball Field	2:42	50	Boxscore
Jul 13, 2022	11:00	Norway	14–6	Poland		Ada Ciganlija Baseball Field	2:59	54	Boxscore
Jul 13, 2022	16:00	Hungary	8–6	Serbia		Ada Ciganlija Baseball Field	3:12	184	Boxscore
Jul 14, 2022	11:00	Poland	2–17	Slovakia	6	Ada Ciganlija Baseball Field	2:18	20	Boxscore
Jul 14, 2022	16:00	Hungary	10–11	Norway	10	Ada Ciganlija Baseball Field	3:45	48	Boxscore
Jul 15, 2022	11:00	Poland	2–14	Hungary	7	Ada Ciganlija Baseball Field	2:19	30	Boxscore
Jul 15, 2022	16:00	Serbia	9–10	Slovakia	11	Ada Ciganlija Baseball Field	3:35	233	Boxscore
Jul 16, 2022	11:00	Slovakia	8–9	Hungary		Ada Ciganlija Baseball Field	3:38	63	Boxscore
Jul 16, 2022	16:00	Norway	7–2	Serbia		Ada Ciganlija Baseball Field	2:35	78	Boxscore

==== Final ====
Date	Local time	Road team	Score	Home team	Inn.	Venue	Game duration	Attendance	Boxscore
Jul 17, 2022	14:00	Hungary	8–1	Slovakia		Ada Ciganlija Baseball Field	2:23	102	Boxscore

=== Grope Utena ===
Grope Utena took place at the Utenos Hipodromas in Utena, Lithuania, on July 13 to 16, 2022. Switzerland defeated Lithuania to qualify for the European Championship.

==== Round robin ====
Pos	Team	Pld	W	L	RF	RA	PCT	GB	Qualification
1	Lithuania (H)	3	3	0	47	19	1.000	—	Final
2	Switzerland	3	2	1	35	24	.667	1	Final
3	Finland	3	1	2	28	29	.333	2	
4	Romania	3	0	3	9	47	.000	3	

Source: WBSC Europe
(H) Hosts

Date	Local time	Road team	Score	Home team	Inn.	Venue	Game duration	Attendance	Boxscore
Jul 13, 2022	11:00	Romania	0–11	Switzerland	7	Utenos Hipodromas	2:10	47	Boxscore
Jul 13, 2022	16:00	Finland	1–14	Lithuania	7	Utenos Hipodromas	2:12	116	Boxscore
Jul 14, 2022	11:00	Switzerland	10–9	Finland	11	Utenos Hipodromas		39	Boxscore
Jul 14, 2022	16:00	Lithuania	18–4	Romania	7	Utenos Hipodromas	2:36	110	Boxscore
Jul 15, 2022	11:00	Finland	18–5	Romania	8	Utenos Hipodromas	2:51	17	Boxscore
Jul 15, 2022	16:00	Switzerland	14–15	Lithuania		Utenos Hipodromas	3:24	101	Boxscore

==== Final ====
Date	Local time	Road team	Score	Home team	Inn.	Venue	Game duration	Attendance	Boxscore
Jul 16, 2022	14:00	Switzerland	3–1	Lithuania		Utenos Hipodromas	2:36	180	Boxscore

=== Grope Blagoevgrad ===
Grope Blagoevgrad took place at the Blagoevgrad Baseball Stadium in Blagoevgrad, Bulgaria, on July 13 to 16, 2022. France defeated Bulgaria to qualify for the European Championship.

==== Round robin ====
Pos	Team	Pld	W	L	RF	RA	PCT	GB	Qualification
1	France	3	3	0	52	4	1.000	—	Final
2	Bulgaria (H)	3	2	1	18	31	.667	1	Final
3	Slovenia	3	1	2	18	36	.333	2	
4	Ireland	3	0	3	8	25	.000	3	

Source: WBSC Europe
(H) Hosts

Date	Local time	Road team	Score	Home team	Inn.	Venue	Game duration	Attendance	Boxscore
Jul 13, 2022	11:00	Slovenia	0–19	France	5	Blagoevgrad Baseball Stadium	1:22	25	Boxscore
Jul 13, 2022	16:00	Bulgaria	3–2	Ireland	10	Blagoevgrad Baseball Stadium	3:10	50	Boxscore
Jul 14, 2022	11:00	Ireland	4–7	Slovenia		Blagoevgrad Baseball Stadium	2:54	25	Boxscore
Jul 14, 2022	16:00	France	18–2	Bulgaria	5	Blagoevgrad Baseball Stadium	1:45	50	Boxscore
Jul 15, 2022	11:00	Ireland	2–15	France	7	Blagoevgrad Baseball Stadium	2:24	25	Boxscore
Jul 15, 2022	16:00	Slovenia	11–13	Bulgaria		Blagoevgrad Baseball Stadium	3:23	50	Boxscore

==== Final ====
Date	Local time	Road team	Score	Home team	Inn.	Venue	Game duration	Attendance	Boxscore
Jul 16, 2022	14:00	Bulgaria	1–8	France		Blagoevgrad Baseball Stadium	2:43	50	Boxscore

== Qualified teams ==
Team	Qualification method	App	First	Last	Streak	Best placement
Netherlands	1st in 2021	34th	1956	2021	27	Champions (twenty-four times, last in 2021)
Israel	2nd in 2021	3rd	2019	2021	3	Runners-up (2021)
Italy	3rd in 2021	36th	1954	2021	27	Champions (ten times, last in 2012)
Spain	4th in 2021	35th	1954	2021	20	Champions (1955)
Czech Republic	5th in 2021	13th	1997	2021	13	Fourth place(2014)
Great Britain	6th in 2021	17th	1967	2021	13	Runners-up (1967, 2007)
Croatia	7th in 2021	12th	1999	2021	12	Seventh place (2021)
Belgium	8th in 2021	31st	1954	2021	7	Champions (1967)
Germany	9th in 2021	28th	1954	2021	15	Runners-up (1957)
Austria	11th in 2021	4th	2007	2021	3	10th place (2019)
Sweden	12th in 2021	32nd	1960	2021	32	Third place (1981, 1993)
Ukraine	13th in 2021	8th	1995	2021	2	ninth place (1995, 2007)
Greece	14th in 2021	8th	2003	2021	2	Runners-up (2003)
France	Group Blagoevgrad winner	27th	1955	2021	18	Third place (1999)
Hungary	Group Belgrade winner	1st	―	―	1	Debut
Switzerland	Group Utena winner	1st	―	―	1	Debut
