= Han Urbanus =

Dutch baseball player (1927–2021)

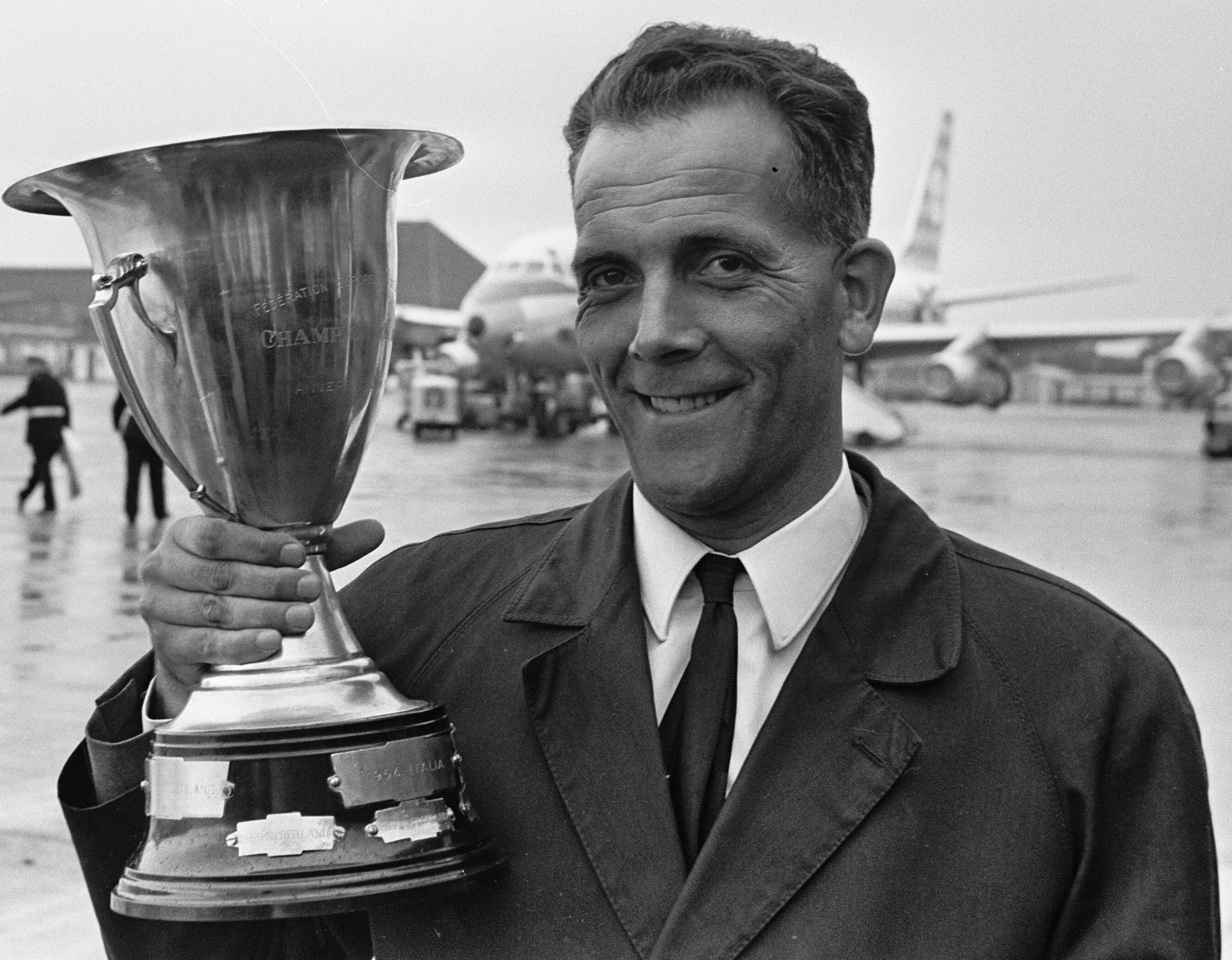
- Urbanus in 1965
- Pitcher / infielder
- Born: 22 June 1927; Rotterdam, Netherlands
- Died: 25 February 2021 (aged 93); Haarlem, Netherlands
- Batted: Right Threw: Right

Member of the Netherlands

Baseball Hall of Fame
- Induction: 1983
Medals
Representing Netherlands
Men's baseball
European Championship
Gold medal – first place	1956 Rome	Team
Gold medal – first place	1957 Mannheim	Team
Gold medal – first place	1958 Amsterdam	Team
Gold medal – first place	1960 Barcelona	Team
Gold medal – first place	1962 Amsterdam	Team
Gold medal – first place	1964 Milan	Team
Gold medal – first place	1965 Madrid	Team

Hendrikus Johannes Urbanus (22 June 1927 – 25 February 2021) was a Dutch baseball player who played most of his professional career as a pitcher. He is generally considered one of the best Dutch players of all time, and was inducted into the Netherlands Baseball Hall of Fame in 1983.

== Professional career ==
Urbanus debuted in the Honkbal Hoofdklasse with OVVO Amsterdam at the age of 19 in 1949, and would play with them for the next 24 years. He led OVVO to the Hoofdklasse championship five times in a row between 1949 and 1953.

In 1952, Urbanus accepted an offer to attend spring training with the New York Giants. The visit was arranged by Albert Balink, a Dutch-American journalist and magazine editor. His performance was decent; in an intra-squad game, the only Giant able to hit Urbanus' pitching out of the infield was Monte Irvin, the future Baseball Hall of Famer. However, he quickly changed his pitching mechanics when it was discovered that, due to a mistranslation in the rules used by Dutch baseball, Urbanus (and all other Dutch pitchers) had been trained to keep his feet on the pitching rubber during his delivery, which stunted his pitch velocity. He also learned how to throw a curveball thanks to the instruction of Giants ace Sal Maglie. Urbanus returned to Giants spring training in 1953 and was reportedly offered a contract but turned it down.

During his Hoofdklasse career, Urbanus threw 9 no-hitters for OVVO, was named best pitcher five times, and was honoured as the league's MVP three times. Despite his success in the league, Urbanus worked outside of baseball as an accountant at Klynveld Kraayenhof & Co. in Rotterdam.

== International career ==
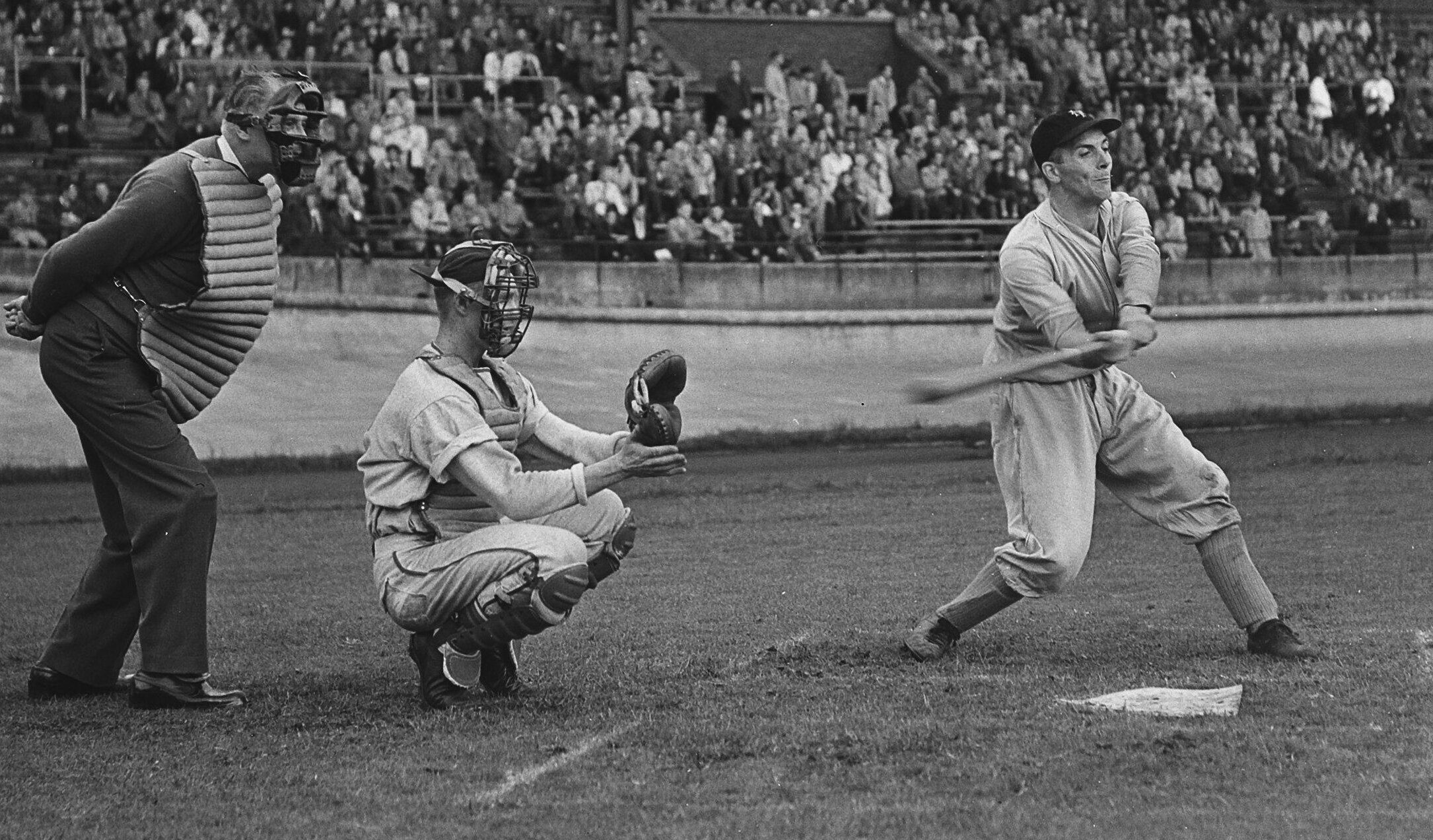
Urbanus (right) batting for the Dutch team in a 1954 game in Haarlem

Urbanus made his debut with the Netherlands national baseball team in 1949 and would continue to play with the national team through 1965. Initially, the national team only faced Belgium in annual games, as well as American teams from military bases in West Germany. Urbanus threw no-hitters against Belgium in 1949 and 1951. Urbanus appeared with the national team in a two-game exhibition series against Great Britain, held at De Meer Stadion in Amsterdam (then the home of AFC Ajax) in 1952. The Dutch won both games, and Urbanus was described in English media as the team's the most impressive player.

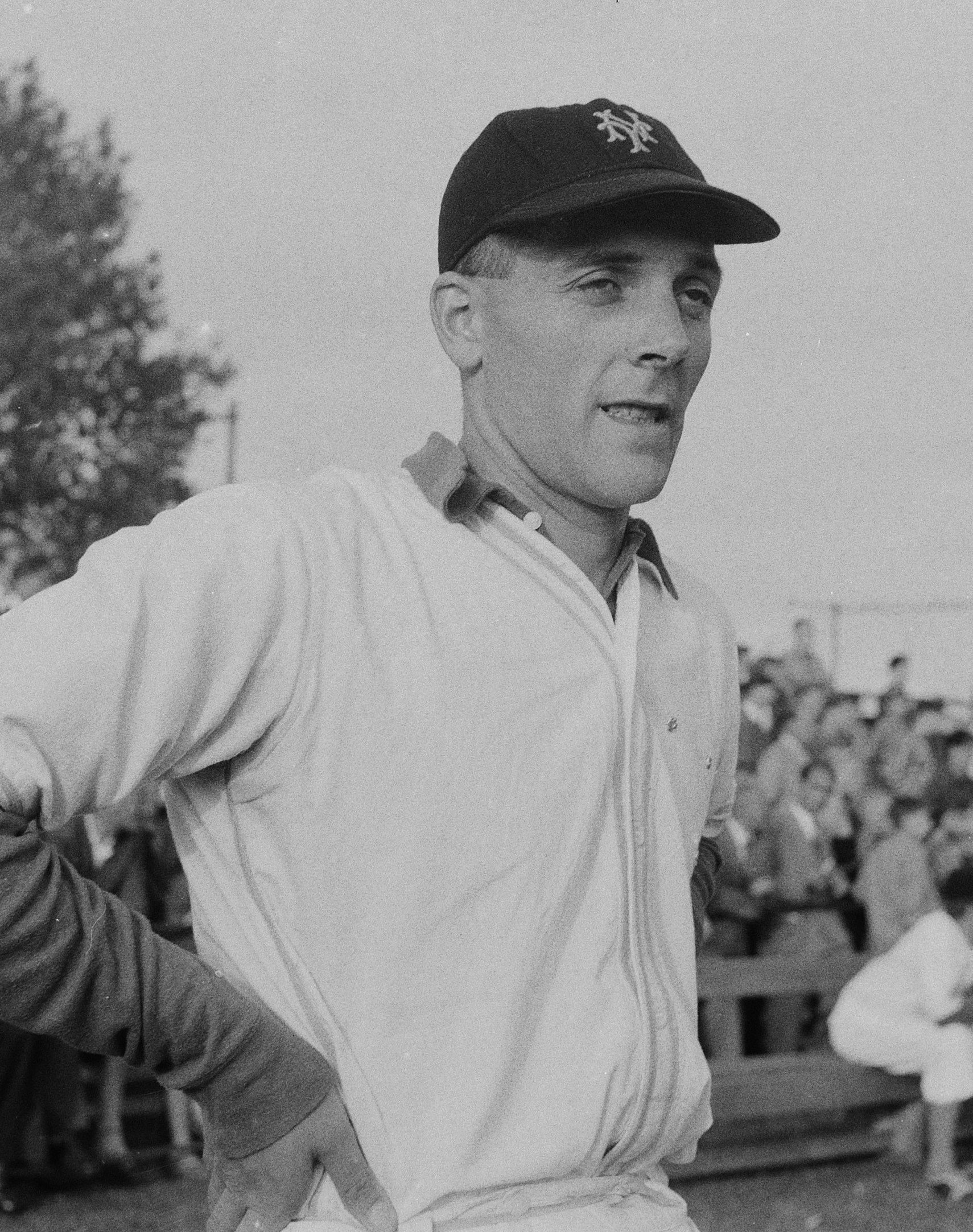
Urbanus in 1957

The Netherlands first made their appearance at the European Baseball Championship in 1956, winning the title over Italy. It would be the first of a highly successful period in international competition for the team, winning ten consecutive titles. Urbanus participated in seven of those titles, from 1956 to 1965. He also accompanied the Netherlands team to the Global World Series, playing in the United States in 1956 and 1957. As the Netherlands and Italy were the two baseball powers of Europe, Urbanus often faced off against Italian ace Giulio Glorioso.

When he retired in 1965, Urbanus had earned 64 caps, at the time a record number of appearances with the national team.

== Later life and death ==
After his retirement, Urbanus was an executive with OVVO, which became the Amstel Tijgers in 1976. In 1988, Amstel Tijgers were absorbed by HCAW, still a member of the Hoofdklasse. He remained active in the Dutch baseball federation and frequently visited tournaments like the European Championships and Haarlem Baseball Week. Along with his former archrival on the mound, Giulio Glorioso, he threw out the ceremonial first pitch before the 100th international game between the Netherlands and Italy on 30 June 2001.

Urbanus's older brother, Charles, played and coached baseball in the Netherlands. Urbanus' sons, Charles Jr. (named after his uncle) and Johan, also played in the Hoofdklasse. His grandson, Nick Urbanus, played in the Texas Rangers minor league system from 2011 to 2014, then in the Hoofdklasse through 2018.

Urbanus died on 25 February 2021.
