= 1957 European Baseball Championship =

Tournament details
- Country: Germany
- City: Mannheim
- Dates: 7–13 July
- Teams: 5
- Defending champions: Netherlands

Final positions
- Champions: Netherlands (2nd title)
- Runners-up: Germany
- Third place: Italy
- Fourth place: Spain

Tournament statistics
- Games played: 10

The 1957 European Baseball Championship was held in Mannheim, Germany. The Netherlands won their second championship in a row by going undefeated, qualifying for the 1957 Global World Series in Detroit. Germany finished in second place, its best-ever finish at the event.

The Netherlands were led by pitchers Han Urbanus, Nico Brands, and Jan Smidt. Germany instigated a bench-clearing brawl during its loss to the Netherlands, alleging that a Belgian umpire favored the Dutch team. A German player also claimed the umpire was drunk. The Italian team also protested improper scorekeeping during its loss to the Netherlands, requiring the game, which the Dutch reportedly led 3–0, to be restarted.

The U.S. Army sponsored the championship, though few Germans attended the event. Players slept in military barracks.

The championship was a round-robin tournament. The tournament was originally planned to be held in Madrid, Spain, but the Spanish baseball federation announced in August 1956 that it would no longer host the event. The 1960 championship would be held in Barcelona, with Madrid hosting in 1965.

== Standings ==
Netherlands pitchers in 1957

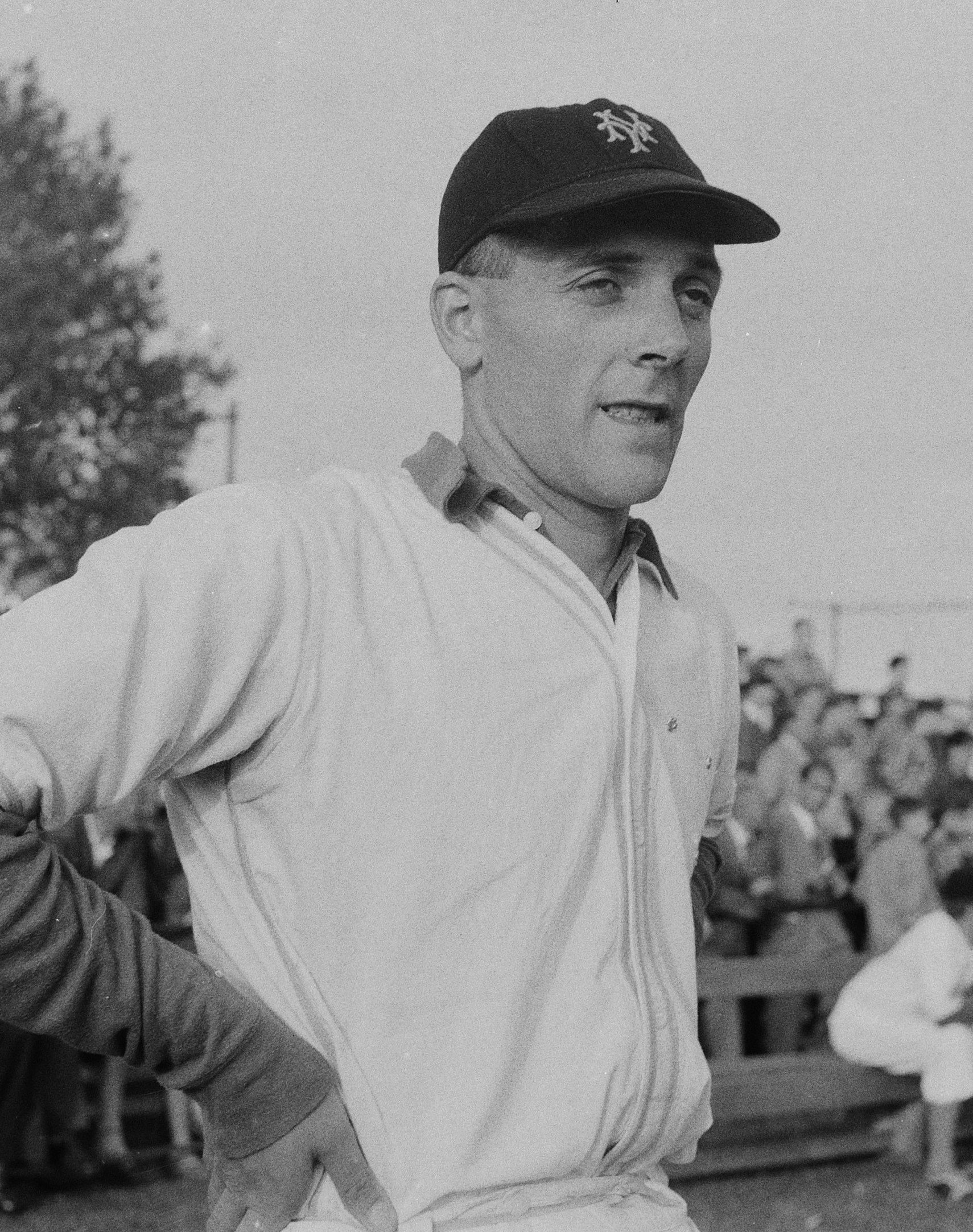
Han Urbanus

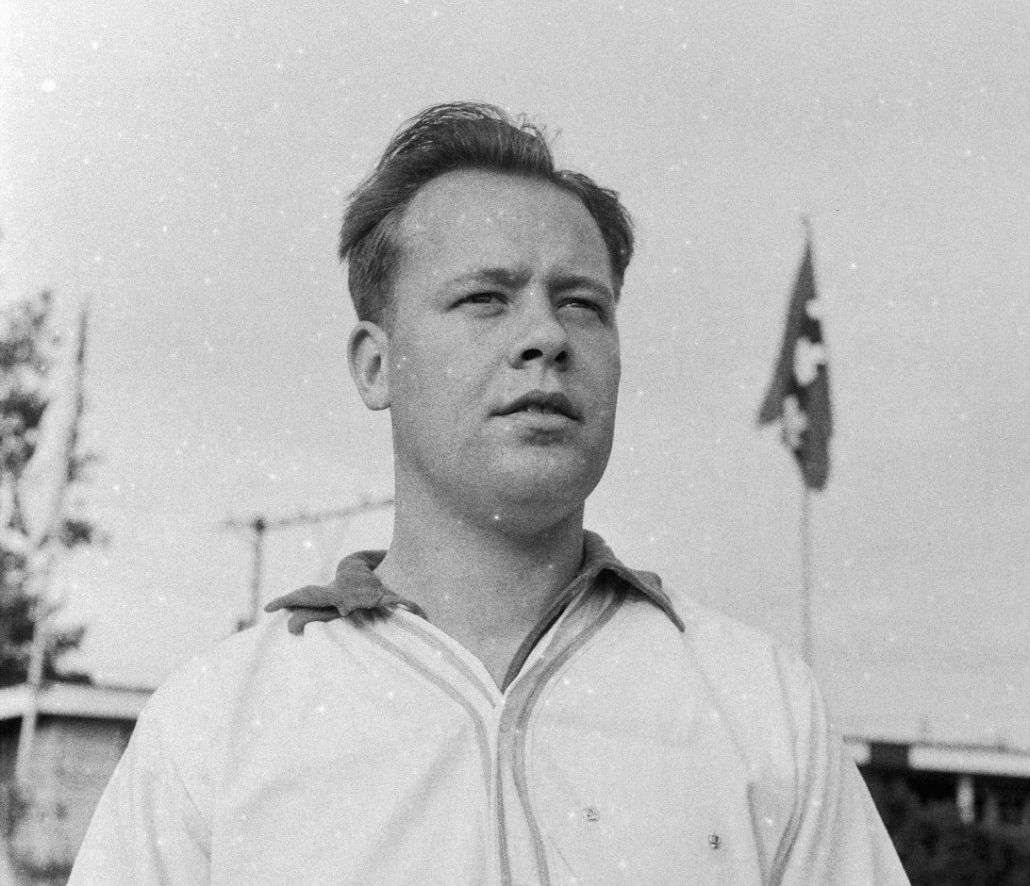
Nico Brands

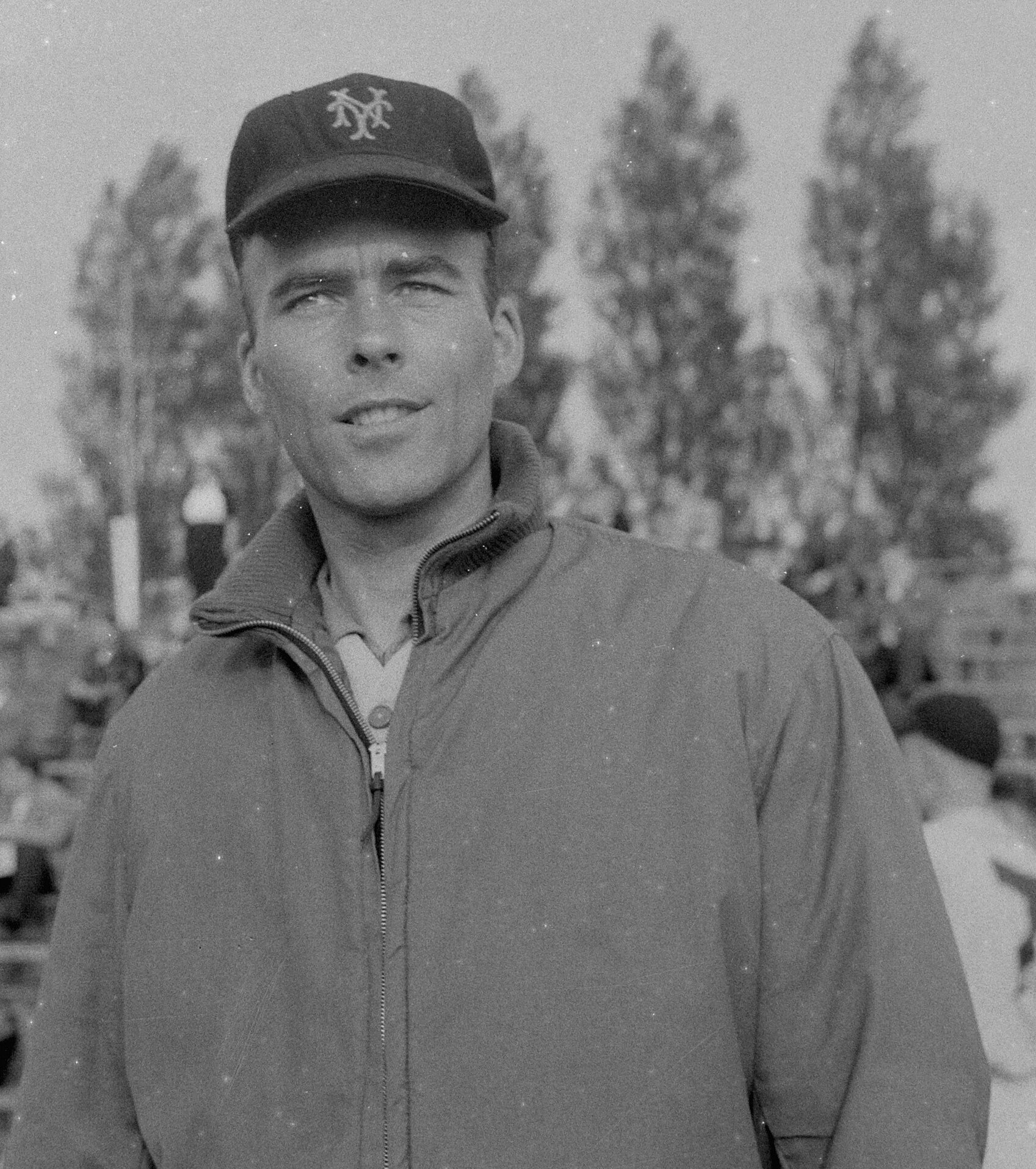
Jan Smidt

Pos.	Team	Record	RS	RA
1	Netherlands	4–0	36	2
2	Germany	3–1	30	23
3	Italy	2–2	18	14
4	Spain	1–3	23	34
5	Belgium	0–4	16	50
