= 2008 European Under-21 Baseball Championship =

Tournament details
- Country: Spain
- Dates: 3 September - 7 September
- Teams: 8
- Defending champions: Russia

Final positions
- Champions: Spain
- Runners-up: Italy
- Third place: Germany
- Fourth place: Czech Republic

The 2008 European Under-21 Baseball Championship was an international baseball competition held in Pamplona, Spain from September 3 to 7, 2008. It featured teams from Belgium, Czech Republic France, Germany, Italy, Russia, Spain and Slovakia.

In the end host Spain won the tournament.

== Group stage ==
=== Pool A ===
==== Standings ====
Qualified for the semi-finals
Did not qualify for the semi-finals

#	Team	Games	Wins	Losses
1	Italy	3	3	0
2	Germany	3	2	1
3	France	3	1	2
4	Belgium	3	0	3

=== Pool B ===
==== Standings ====
Qualified for the semi-finals
Did not qualify for the semi-finals

#	Team	Games	Wins	Losses
1	Spain	3	3	0
2	Czech Republic	3	2	1
3	Russia	3	1	2
4	Slovakia	3	0	3

== Final round ==
=== Semi-finals ===
September 6, 2008	Italy	6 – 4	Czech Republic	Burlada, Spain
September 6, 2008		Boxscore		Burlada, Spain

September 6, 2008	Spain	6 – 4	Germany	Burlada, Spain
September 6, 2008		Boxscore		Burlada, Spain

=== 3rd place ===
September 7, 2008	Czech Republic	11 – 12	Germany	Burlada, Spain
September 7, 2008		Boxscore		Burlada, Spain

=== Final ===
September 7, 2008	Italy	2 – 11	Spain	Burlada, Spain
September 7, 2008		Boxscore		Burlada, Spain

== Final standings ==
Rk	Team
1	Spain
Lost in final
2	Italy
Failed to qualify for the Final
3	Germany
4	Czech Republic
Failed to qualify for the semi-finals
5	Russia
6	France
7	Slovakia
8	Belgium

2008 European Under-21 Baseball Championship

Spain
