= 1983 European Baseball Championship =

Tournament details
- Country: Italy
- Dates: 28 July–7 August
- Teams: 6
- Defending champions: Netherlands

Final positions
- Champions: Italy
- Runners-up: Netherlands
- Third place: Belgium
- Fourth place: Spain

The 1983 European Baseball Championship was held in four cities, Catiglione della Pescaia, Florence, Grosseto, and Lucca, in Tuscany, Italy. Italy won the tournament, defeating the defending champion Netherlands in four games in the best-of-five finals. By winning the tournament, Italy qualified for the 1984 Summer Olympics.

Italy shut out France 32–0 and Spain 24–0 in the round-robin preliminary round. Italy's Roberto Bianchi batted .487 with 3 home runs and 15 RBI in 9 games. Italy used 14 Italian American players, who would not necessarily be eligible for the Olympics.

== Standings ==
Pos.	Team	Record
1	Italy	8–1
2	Netherlands	5–4
3	Belgium	6–2
4	Spain	3–5
5	Sweden	3–5
6	France	0–8
