= European Men's Baseball Championship =

Baseball European Championship
- Most recent season or competition: 2025 European Baseball Championship
- Sport: Baseball
- First season: 1954
- No. of teams: 16
- Confederation: WBSC Europe
- Most recent champion: Netherlands (2025)
- Most titles: Netherlands (25 titles)
- Website: WBSCEurope.com

The European Baseball Championship is the main championship tournament between men's national baseball teams in Europe, governed by WBSC Europe (formerly the Confederation of European Baseball (CEB)).

== History ==
Italy won the inaugural European Baseball Championship in 1954, organized shortly after the CEB was formed. The Netherlands won the first tournament they competed in, 1956, and the competition has since been dominated by the Dutch and Italians, with Spain, with two titles, and Belgium being the only other teams to win a championship.

After being an annual competition for five years, it was held every two years. There have been several adjustments to this schedule. Most recently, following a three-year gap after the 2016 championship, the tournament has been held in odd-numbered years beginning in 2019. The 2025 competition was the 38th European championship held. There have been at least 4 teams in each championship, with the field growing to 12 teams in 1997 and 16 teams in 2021.

The European championship has served as a qualifying tournament for the Summer Olympics. Tournament games are also included in World Baseball Softball Confederation rankings, which determine participation in the WBSC Premier12.

== Format and qualification ==
The current championship classification system divides the national teams into three pools, A, B, and C.

Teams in Pool A and B play in the championship, with teams from A pool playing in two groups where the top two teams proceed to the quarter finals directly and the bottom two teams play in the crossover qualifiers. The teams from pool B play in two groups, with the winners proceeding to the crossover qualifiers and the bottom two teams eliminated. The top four teams from the crossover qualifiers join the top two teams from each A pool group in the quarter finals.

The last two teams from the championship are relegated to pool C that plays the qualifier competition held in the years between the top championship, while the two best teams at that competition will move up to B pool.

=== Current pools ===
Prior to the 2027 tournament.

Pool A	Pool B	Pool C
Netherlands; Italy; Czech Republic; Spain; Germany; Great Britain; Israel; Croatia	Austria; Sweden; Switzerland; France; Belgium; Greece; Bulgaria; Slovakia	Hungary^; Lithuania^; Bulgaria+; Finland; Ireland; Norway; Poland; Romania; Serbia; Slovakia+; Slovenia; Ukraine

^ - Relegated to European Qualifier during 2025 championship

+ - Won European qualifier for 2027 championship and advanced to Pool B

== Results ==
Ed.	Years	Final hosts	Finalists			Semi-finalists			Teams
Ed.	Years	Final hosts	Champions	Score	Runners-up	3rd place	Score	4th place	Teams
1	1954; Details	(Belgium); Antwerp	Italy	7 – 4	Spain	Belgium	12 – 5	West Germany	4
2	1955; Details	(Spain); Barcelona	Spain	round-robin	Belgium	West Germany	round-robin	Italy	5
3	1956; Details	(Italy); Rome	Netherlands	round-robin	Belgium	Italy	round-robin	Spain	5
4	1957; Details	(Germany); Mannheim	Netherlands	round-robin	West Germany	Italy	round-robin	Spain	5
5	1958; Details	(Netherlands); Amsterdam	Netherlands	5 – 2	Italy	West Germany	—N/a	Belgium	6
6	1960; Details	(Spain); Barcelona	Netherlands	round-robin	Italy	Spain	round-robin	Sweden	4
7	1962; Details	(Netherlands); Amsterdam	Netherlands	round-robin	Italy	Spain	round-robin	Belgium	7
8	1964; Details	(Italy); Milan	Netherlands	round-robin	Italy	Spain	round-robin	Sweden	5
9	1965; Details	(Spain); Madrid	Netherlands	round-robin	Italy	West Germany	round-robin	Spain	5
10	1967; Details	(Belgium); Antwerp	Belgium	round-robin	Great Britain	West Germany	round-robin	Spain	5
11	1969; Details	(Germany); Wiesbaden	Netherlands	round-robin	Italy	Spain	—N/a	West Germany	7
12	1971; Details	(Italy); Parma / Bologna	Netherlands	4 – 2 0 – 1 7 – 3	Italy	West Germany	6 – 1	Belgium	9
13	1973; Details	(Netherlands); Haarlem	Netherlands	round-robin	Italy	Spain	round-robin	Belgium	6
14	1975; Details	(Spain); Barcelona	Italy	0 – 2 7 – 1 5 – 1 4 – 9 9 – 4	Netherlands	West Germany	1 – 7 9 – 4 2 – 6 9 – 4 6 – 3	Spain	6
15	1977; Details	(Netherlands); Haarlem	Italy	1 – 2 7 – 4 4 – 1 1 – 0	Netherlands	Belgium	round-robin	Spain	5
16	1979; Details	(Italy); Trieste	Italy	14 – 1 5 – 0 8 – 4 5 – 8	Netherlands	Belgium	13 – 11 5 – 7	Sweden	4
17	1981; Details	(Netherlands); Haarlem	Netherlands	8 – 3 11 – 7 8 – 1	Italy	Sweden	2 – 8 12 – 2 2 – 1	Belgium	4
18	1983; Details	(Italy); Florence	Italy	14 – 1 3 – 2 8 – 2 4 – 14	Netherlands	Belgium	round-robin	Spain	6
19	1985; Details	(Netherlands); Haarlem / Eindhoven	Netherlands	6 – 4 12 – 4 11 – 8 8 – 6	Italy	Belgium	round-robin	Sweden	6
20	1987; Details	(Spain); Barcelona	Netherlands	7 – 4 4 – 13 4 – 5 16 – 1	Italy	Spain	1 – 4 12 – 1 1 – 7 12 – 6	Belgium	7
21	1989; Details	(France); Paris	Italy	6 – 10 8 – 6 7 – 5	Netherlands	Spain	5 – 4 11 – 12 18 – 9	Sweden	8
22	1991; Details	(Italy); Nettuno	Italy	12 – 1 9 – 2 3 – 1	Netherlands	Spain	8 – 7 11 – 1 13 – 21	France	8
23	1993; Details	(Sweden); Stockholm	Netherlands	7 – 1 7 – 2 11 – 2 7 – 21 11 – 0	Italy	Sweden	5 – 6 3 – 2 11 – 9 7 – 4 5 – 14	France	8
24	1995; Details	(Netherlands); Haarlem	Netherlands	9 – 12 13 – 7 13 – 10 7 – 4	Italy	Belgium	12 – 3 8 – 6 11 – 14 11 – 15 8 – 6	Spain	10
25	1997; Details	(France); Paris	Italy	4 – 2	Netherlands	Spain	7 – 2	Russia	12
26	1999; Details	(Italy); Bologna / Parma	Netherlands	3 – 0	Italy	France	8 – 3	Russia	12
27	2001; Details	(Germany); Bonn	Netherlands	4 – 0	Russia	Italy	3 – 0	France	12
28	2003; Details	(Netherlands); Haarlem / Amsterdam / Rotterdam	Netherlands	2 – 0	Greece	Spain	5 – 2	Sweden	12
29	2005; Details	(Czech Republic); Prague	Netherlands	15 – 0	Italy	Spain	7 – 3	Germany	12
30	2007; Details	(Spain); Barcelona	Netherlands	round-robin	Great Britain	Spain	round-robin	Germany	12
31	2010; Details	(Germany); Stuttgart	Italy	8 – 4	Netherlands	Germany	round-robin	Greece	12
32	2012; Details	(Netherlands); Rotterdam	Italy	8 – 3	Netherlands	Spain	round-robin	Germany	12
33	2014; Details	(Germany) / (Czech Republic); Regensburg / Brno	Netherlands	6 – 3	Italy	Spain	round-robin	Czech Republic	12
34	2016; Details	(Netherlands); Hoofddorp	Netherlands	3 – 2	Spain	Italy	round-robin	Germany	12
35	2019; Details	(Germany); Bonn / Solingen	Netherlands	5 – 1	Italy	Spain	16 – 11	Israel	12
36	2021; Details	(Italy); Piedmont	Netherlands	9 – 4	Israel	Italy	2 – 0	Spain	16
37	2023; Details	(Czech Republic); Prague / Brno / Třebíč / Ostrava / Blansko	Spain	11 – 2	Great Britain	Netherlands	5 – 4	Germany	16
38	2025; Details	(Netherlands) / (Belgium) / (Italy); Rotterdam / Antwerp / Milan	Netherlands	6 – 5	Italy	Czech Republic	9 – 2	Spain	16
39	2027; Details	(Germany); Regensburg							

== Medals (1954–2025) ==
Rank	Nation	Gold	Silver	Bronze	Total
1	Netherlands	25	9	1	35
2	Italy	10	18	5	33
3	Spain	2	2	15	19
4	Belgium	1	2	6	9
5	Great Britain	0	3	0	3
6	Germany	0	1	7	8
7	Greece	0	1	0	1
7	Israel	0	1	0	1
7	Russia	0	1	0	1
10	Sweden	0	0	2	2
11	Czech Republic	0	0	1	1
11	France	0	0	1	1
Totals (12 entries)		38	38	38	114

== Participating nations ==
Nation	1954	1955	1956	1957	1958	1960	1962	1964	1965	1967	1969	1971	1973	1975	1977	1979	1981	1983	1985	1987	1989	1991	1993	1995	1997	1999	2001	2003	2005	2007	2010	2012	2014	2016	2019	2021	2023	2025	Total
Austria																														11					10	11	15	9	5
Belgium	3rd place, bronze medalist(s)	2nd place, silver medalist(s)	2nd place, silver medalist(s)	5	4		4			1st place, gold medalist(s)	5	4	4		3rd place, bronze medalist(s)	3rd place, bronze medalist(s)	4	3rd place, bronze medalist(s)	3rd place, bronze medalist(s)	4	6	5	6	3rd place, bronze medalist(s)	6	6	9	11			10	9	7	6	7	8	11	13	32
Croatia																										11	8	10	12	8	11	10	12	10	11	7	10	8	13
Czech Republic																									7	8	5	6	5	12	7	5	4	5	5	5	5	3rd place, bronze medalist(s)	14
France		5			6		6	5			7	9	6	6				6		6	5	4	4	5	5	3rd place, bronze medalist(s)	4	7	6	5	6	8	6	7	7	15	7	12	28
Germany	4	3rd place, bronze medalist(s)	5	2nd place, silver medalist(s)	3rd place, bronze medalist(s)		5		3rd place, bronze medalist(s)	3rd place, bronze medalist(s)	4	3rd place, bronze medalist(s)		3rd place, bronze medalist(s)						7	8		7	6	10	10	7	12	4	4	3rd place, bronze medalist(s)	4	5	4	6	9	4	5	29
Great Britain										2nd place, silver medalist(s)		7									7	8			9	9	10	9	7	2nd place, silver medalist(s)	8	11	9	9	9	6	2nd place, silver medalist(s)	6	18
Greece																												2nd place, silver medalist(s)	9		4	7	10	11		14	13	13	9
Hungary																																					16	15	2
Israel																																			4	2nd place, silver medalist(s)	6	7	4
Italy	1st place, gold medalist(s)	4	3rd place, bronze medalist(s)	3rd place, bronze medalist(s)	2nd place, silver medalist(s)	2nd place, silver medalist(s)	2nd place, silver medalist(s)	2nd place, silver medalist(s)	2nd place, silver medalist(s)		2nd place, silver medalist(s)	2nd place, silver medalist(s)	2nd place, silver medalist(s)	1st place, gold medalist(s)	1st place, gold medalist(s)	1st place, gold medalist(s)	2nd place, silver medalist(s)	1st place, gold medalist(s)	2nd place, silver medalist(s)	2nd place, silver medalist(s)	1st place, gold medalist(s)	1st place, gold medalist(s)	2nd place, silver medalist(s)	2nd place, silver medalist(s)	1st place, gold medalist(s)	2nd place, silver medalist(s)	3rd place, bronze medalist(s)	5	2nd place, silver medalist(s)	7	1st place, gold medalist(s)	1st place, gold medalist(s)	2nd place, silver medalist(s)	3rd place, bronze medalist(s)	2nd place, silver medalist(s)	3rd place, bronze medalist(s)	9	2nd place, silver medalist(s)	37
Lithuania																																						15	1
Netherlands			1st place, gold medalist(s)	1st place, gold medalist(s)	1st place, gold medalist(s)	1st place, gold medalist(s)	1st place, gold medalist(s)	1st place, gold medalist(s)	1st place, gold medalist(s)		1st place, gold medalist(s)	1st place, gold medalist(s)	1st place, gold medalist(s)	2nd place, silver medalist(s)	2nd place, silver medalist(s)	2nd place, silver medalist(s)	1st place, gold medalist(s)	2nd place, silver medalist(s)	1st place, gold medalist(s)	1st place, gold medalist(s)	2nd place, silver medalist(s)	2nd place, silver medalist(s)	1st place, gold medalist(s)	1st place, gold medalist(s)	2nd place, silver medalist(s)	1st place, gold medalist(s)	1st place, gold medalist(s)	1st place, gold medalist(s)	1st place, gold medalist(s)	1st place, gold medalist(s)	2nd place, silver medalist(s)	2nd place, silver medalist(s)	1st place, gold medalist(s)	1st place, gold medalist(s)	1st place, gold medalist(s)	1st place, gold medalist(s)	3rd place, bronze medalist(s)	1st place, gold medalist(s)	35
Russia																							8	8	4	4	2nd place, silver medalist(s)	8	11	10		12	8	12		10			12
San Marino												5							6																				2
Slovakia																																				16			1
Slovenia																								10	12	12													3
Soviet Union																						6																	1
Spain	2nd place, silver medalist(s)	1st place, gold medalist(s)	4	4	5	3rd place, bronze medalist(s)	3rd place, bronze medalist(s)	3rd place, bronze medalist(s)	4	4	3rd place, bronze medalist(s)	6	3rd place, bronze medalist(s)	4	4			4	5	3rd place, bronze medalist(s)	3rd place, bronze medalist(s)	3rd place, bronze medalist(s)	5	4	3rd place, bronze medalist(s)	5	6	3rd place, bronze medalist(s)	3rd place, bronze medalist(s)	3rd place, bronze medalist(s)	9	3rd place, bronze medalist(s)	3rd place, bronze medalist(s)	2nd place, silver medalist(s)	3rd place, bronze medalist(s)	4	1st place, gold medalist(s)	4	36
Sweden						4	7	4	5	5	6	8	5	5	5	4	3rd place, bronze medalist(s)	5	4	5	4	7	3rd place, bronze medalist(s)	7	8	7	12	4	8	6	5	6	11	8	12	12	8	10	33
Switzerland																																					12	11	2
Ukraine																								9	11		11		10	9	12					13	14		8
Nations (21)	4	5	5	5	6	4	7	5	5	5	7	9	6	6	5	4	4	6	6	7	8	8	8	10	12	12	12	12	12	12	12	12	12	12	12	16	16	16	

== Most valuable player ==
The tournament has regularly issued awards for the most valuable player, best pitcher, batting statistical leaders, and occasionally an All-Star team. Three Dutch players, Hamilton Richardson, Marcel Joost, and Johnny Balentina, have won multiple MVPs, with Balentina most recently repeating in 1995 and 1997.

Tournament most valuable players
Year	Name	Team	Ref
1955	José Luis Bernardo	Spain	
1962	Leo Kops	Netherlands	
1964	Boudewijn Maat	Netherlands	
1965	Hamilton Richardson	Netherlands	
1967	Roland Hoffmann	West Germany	
1969	Hamilton Richardson	Netherlands	
1973	Hamilton Richardson	Netherlands	
1975	Charles Urbanus Jr.	Netherlands	
1977	Ted Alfieri	Italy	
1979	David DeMarco	Italy	
1981	Paul Smit	Netherlands	
1985	Marcel Joost	Netherlands	
1987	Rikkert Faneyte	Netherlands	
1989	Robert Niggebrugge	Netherlands	
1991	Guglielmo Trinci	Italy	
1993	Marcel Joost	Netherlands	
1995	Johnny Balentina	Netherlands	
1997	Johnny Balentina	Netherlands	
1999	Daniel Newman	Italy	
2001	Rinat Makhmoutov	Russia	
2003	Xavier Civit	Spain	
2005	Ivanon Coffie	Netherlands	
2007	Brant Ust	Great Britain	
2010	Giuseppe Mazzanti	Italy	
2012	Lorenzo Avagnina	Italy	
2014	Curt Smith	Netherlands	
2016	Stijn van der Meer	Netherlands	
2019	Ademar Rifaela	Netherlands	
2021	Roger Bernadina	Netherlands	
2023	Wander Encarnación	Spain	
2025	Didi Gregorius	Netherlands	

== European B Baseball Championship ==
1. 1982 European Baseball Championship - Division B
2. 1984 European Baseball Championship - Division B
3. 1986 European Baseball Championship - Division B
4. 1988 European Baseball Championship - Division B
5. 1990 European Baseball Championship - Division B
6. 1992 European Baseball Championship - Division B
7. 1994 European Baseball Championship - Division B
8. 1996 European Baseball Championship - Division B
9. 1998 European Baseball Championship - Division B
10. 2000 European Baseball Championship - Division B
11. 2002 European Baseball Championship - Division B
12. 2004 European Baseball Championship - Division B
13. 2013 European Baseball Championship - Division B
14. 2015 European Baseball Championship - Division B
15. 2017 European Baseball Championship - Division B
16. 2019 European Baseball Championship – B-Pool

Note: No events in 2005–2012.

== European C Baseball Championship ==
1. 2014 European Baseball Championship - Division C
2. 2016 European Baseball Championship - Division C
3. 2018 European Baseball Championship - Division C

== European Baseball Championship Qualification ==
1. 2007 European Baseball Championship – Qualification
2. 2010 European Baseball Championship – Qualification
3. 2012 European Baseball Championship – Qualification
4. 2014 European Baseball Championship – Qualification
5. 2016 European Baseball Championship – Qualification
6. 2019 European Baseball Championship – Qualification
7. 2021 European Baseball Championship – Qualification
8. 2023 European Baseball Championship – Qualification

== See also ==
- European Women's Baseball Championship
- European Men's U23 Baseball Championship
- European Men's U21 Baseball Championship
- European Men's U18 Baseball Championship
- European Men's U15 Baseball Championship
- European Men's Softball Championship
- European Women's Softball Championship
- European Men's Club Baseball Championship
- European Women's Club Baseball Championship
- European Champion Cup Final Four (Men / Women)
- CEB Federation Cup (Men / Women)
- CEB Cup (Men / Women)
- European Men's Baseball5 Championship
- European Women's Baseball5 Championship
- Baseball awards § Europe
