= Leslie Nacar =

Venezuelan baseball player (born 1983)

Panathinaikos Baseball
- Pitcher
- Born: July 20, 1983 (age 43); Libertad de Barinas, Venezuela
- Bats: Right Throws: Right
- Stats at Baseball Reference

Leslie Jassttin Nacar Mejias (born July 20, 1983) is a Venezuelan professional baseball player, who is currently with the Tenerife Marlins of the División de Honor de Béisbol.

== Career ==
Nacar played in the Arizona Rookie League for the San Francisco Giants organization from 2001-2003 before he missed the 2004 season with an injury and was released. He subsequently has pitched for the Tenerife Marlins in the División de Honor de Béisbol, where he pitched a no-hitter for the Marlins in 2009.

Additionally, Nacar played winter ball with the Cardenales de Lara and Tiburones de La Guaira clubs of the Venezuelan Professional Baseball League in parts of three seasons spanning 2003–2006.

In between, Nacar played for the Spain national baseball team in the 2013 World Baseball Classic. He also played for Team Spain in the 2019 European Baseball Championship. He then played for the team at the Africa/Europe 2020 Olympic Qualification tournament, in Italy in September 2019.
