= 1979 European Baseball Championship =

Tournament details
- Country: Italy
- Dates: 11–19 August
- Teams: 4
- Defending champions: Italy

Final positions
- Champions: Italy
- Runners-up: Netherlands
- Third place: Belgium
- Fourth place: Sweden

Awards
- MVP: (Italy) Dave DeMarco

The 1979 European Baseball Championship was held in Trieste and Ronchi dei Legionari, Italy. Italy won their third consecutive championship in a row, defeating The Netherlands in a best-of-five games final. Four teams competed, the fewest number of teams since the 1960 championship. The same four teams would return in 1981.

Dave DeMarco, an Italian-American who played college baseball at Dartmouth, was the tournament MVP for Italy, batting .385 with 12 runs batted in.

== Standings ==
| Pos. | Team | Record |
|---|---|---|
| 1 | Italy | 7–1 |
| 2 | Netherlands | 3–4 |
| 3 | Belgium | 2–3 |
| 4 | Sweden | 1–4 |

== Awards ==
- Most valuable player: (Italy) Dave DeMarco
- Best hitter: (Italy) Dario Borghino
- Best pitcher: (Italy) Giuseppe Del Sardo
