= 1964 European Baseball Championship =

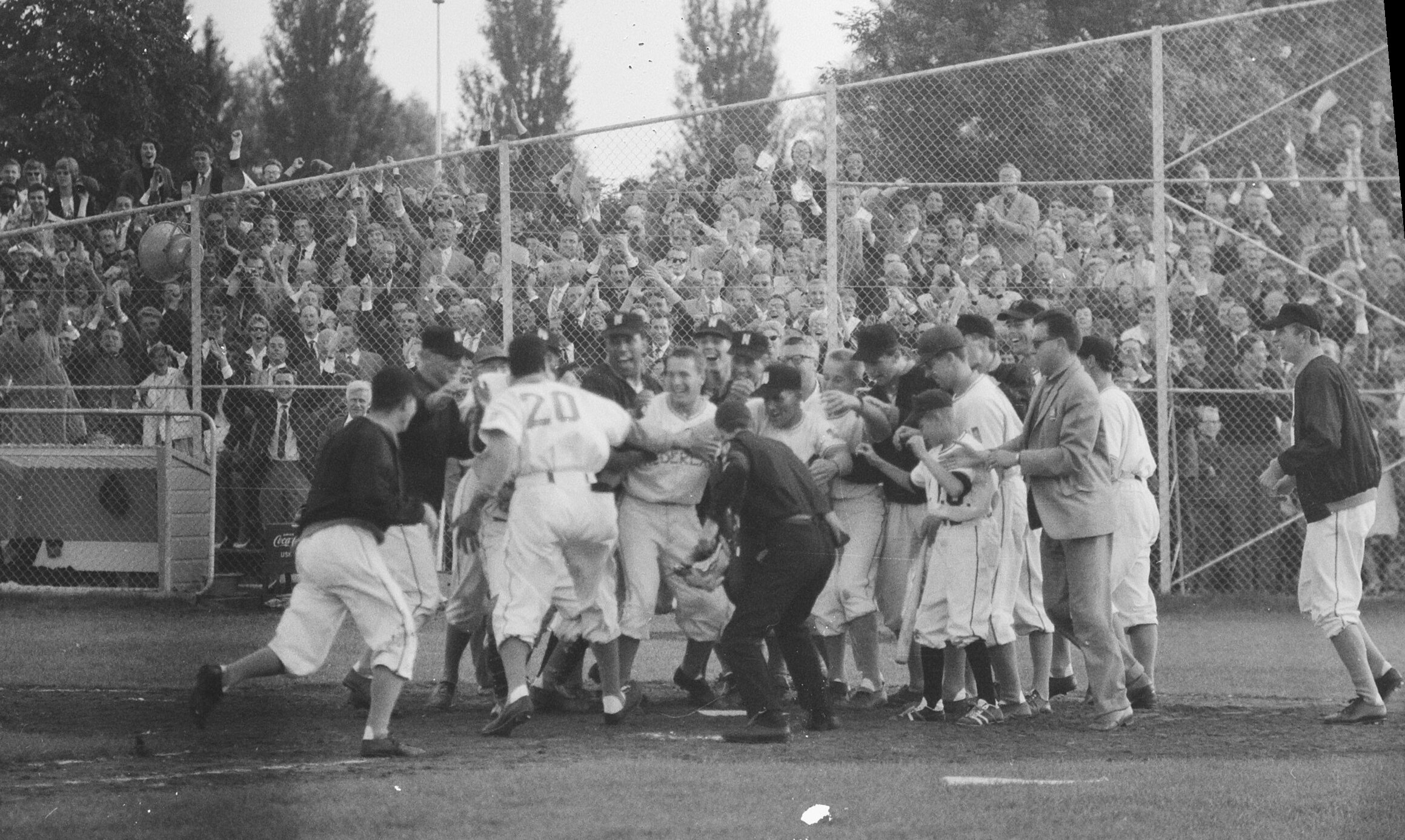
- The Netherlands players celebrating their 1964 championship

Tournament details
- Country: Italy
- City: Milan
- Dates: 29 August–6 September
- Teams: 5
- Defending champions: Netherlands

Final positions
- Champions: Netherlands (6th title)
- Runners-up: Italy
- Third place: Spain
- Fourth place: Sweden

Tournament statistics
- Games played: 10
- Best BA: (Netherlands) Boudewijn Maat (.727)

Awards
- MVP: (Netherlands) Boudewijn Maat

The 1964 European Baseball Championship was held in Milan, Italy. The Netherlands was the undefeated champion for the sixth consecutive tournament. Italy finished in second place for the fourth consecutive time. In the decisive match, 6,000 people watched the host Italy lose to the Netherlands, who bested Italian pitcher Giulio Glorioso, 3–1. The Dutch and Italians both scored at least 10 runs in every game they played. Sweden, appearing in its second championship, won its first-ever game, beating winless France. The tournament used a mercy rule for the first time, stopping games after the 7th inning if a team led by at least 14 runs. This was used in three games, all Dutch and Italian wins.

The tournament was played at JF Kennedy Sports Center, which was inaugurated by Milan mayor Pietro Bucalossi for the event. The U.S. Chamber of Commerce helped pay for construction of the stadium, named after the recently assassinated U.S. president.

The Dutch team won most of the tournament awards, including most valuable player for first baseman Boudewijn Maat, best pitcher for Rob Hoffmann, best manager for Archie Allen (who left the team after the tournament), and best catcher Wim Crowel. Han Urbanus was the captain of the Dutch team, which also had future championship stars Hamilton Richardson, Simon Arrindell, and Hudson John, all three of whom were born in the Dutch Antilles.

== Standings ==
Pos.	Team	Record	RS	RA
1	Netherlands	4–0	62	5
2	Italy	3–1	51	5
3	Spain	2–2	26	35
4	Sweden	1–3	16	47
5	France	0–4	6	69

== Awards ==
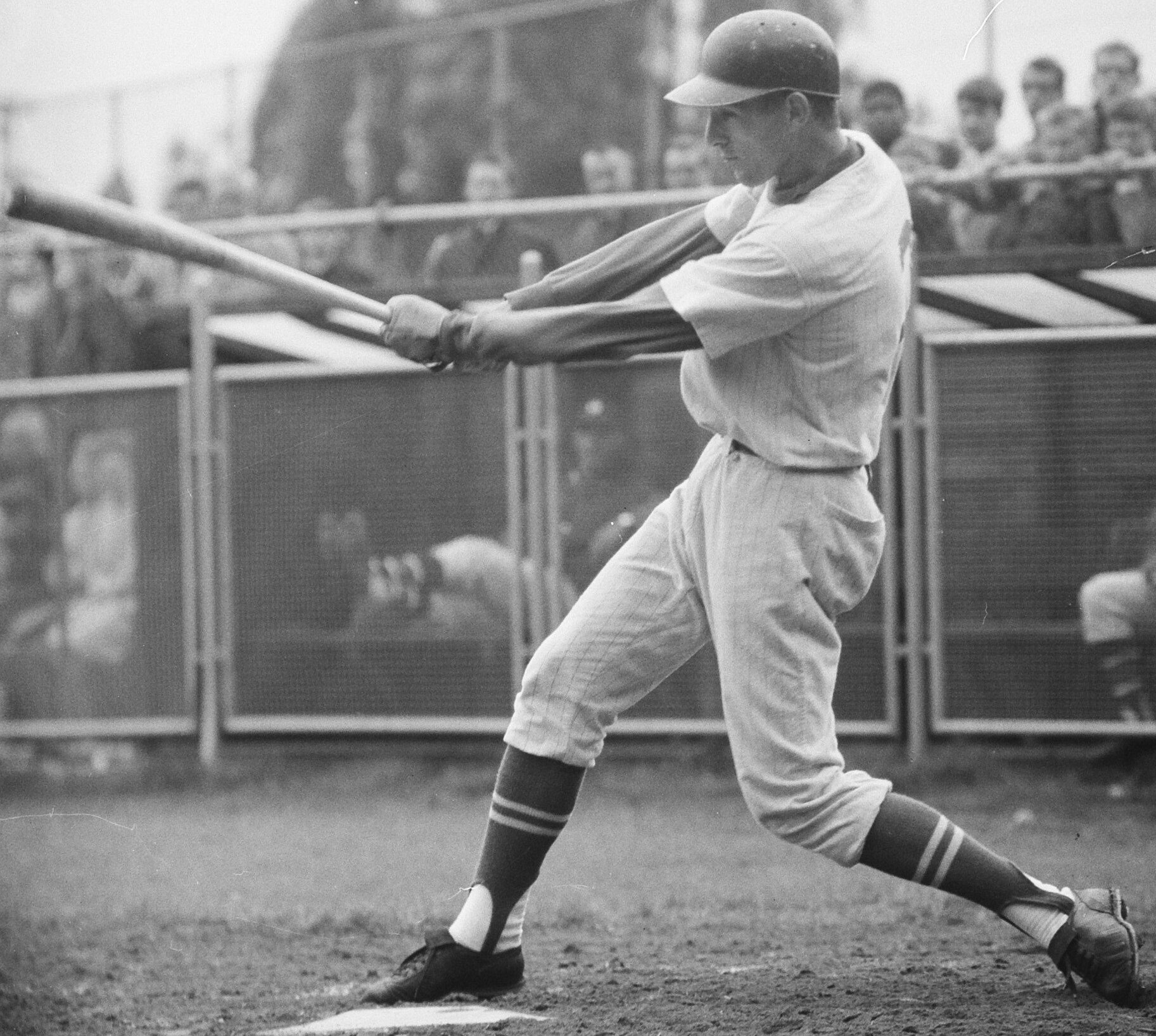
Boudewijn Maat had the highest batting average and won the MVP award

- Most valuable player: (Netherlands) Boudewijn Maat
- Best batting average: (Netherlands) Maat, .727
- Best pitcher: (Netherlands) Rob Hoffmann
- Best catcher: (Netherlands) Wim Crowel
- Best manager: (Netherlands) Archie Allen
- Best umpire: (United States) Frank Fernandez
