= 1975 European Baseball Championship =

Tournament details
- Country: Spain
- City: Barcelona
- Dates: 25 July–3 August
- Teams: 6
- Defending champions: Netherlands

Final positions
- Champions: Italy (2nd title)
- Runners-up: Netherlands
- Third place: West Germany
- Fourth place: Spain

Tournament statistics
- Best BA: (West Germany) Roland Hoffmann (.500)

Awards
- MVP: (Netherlands) Charles Urbanus Jr.

The 1975 European Baseball Championship was held at Montjuïc Municipal Stadium in Barcelona, Spain. Italy won the tournament, defeating defending champion The Netherlands in a best-of-five-games championship series. It was the first time the Dutch team did not win a European championship they participated in. Bill Arce, who had previously won the 1971 championship leading the Netherlands, managed Italy, whose pitchers had a 1.35 earned run average during the tournament. West Germany finished third after splitting a four-game bronze-medal series with Spain. Sweden swept France in three games, with the French losing all five games in the tournament.

The host stadium had several improvements for the tournament, including new light towers, a new grass field, new luxury boxes, and improved changing rooms. There was a taxi strike during the tournament, so new bus routes took fans to games. The tournament overlapped with a Davis Cup tennis zone final in Barcelona, in which Björn Borg and Sweden defeated Spain.

== Standings ==
Pos.	Team	Record
1	Italy	5–2
2	Netherlands	4–3
3	West Germany	3–3
4	Spain	3–3
5	Sweden	3–2
6	France	0–5

== Awards ==
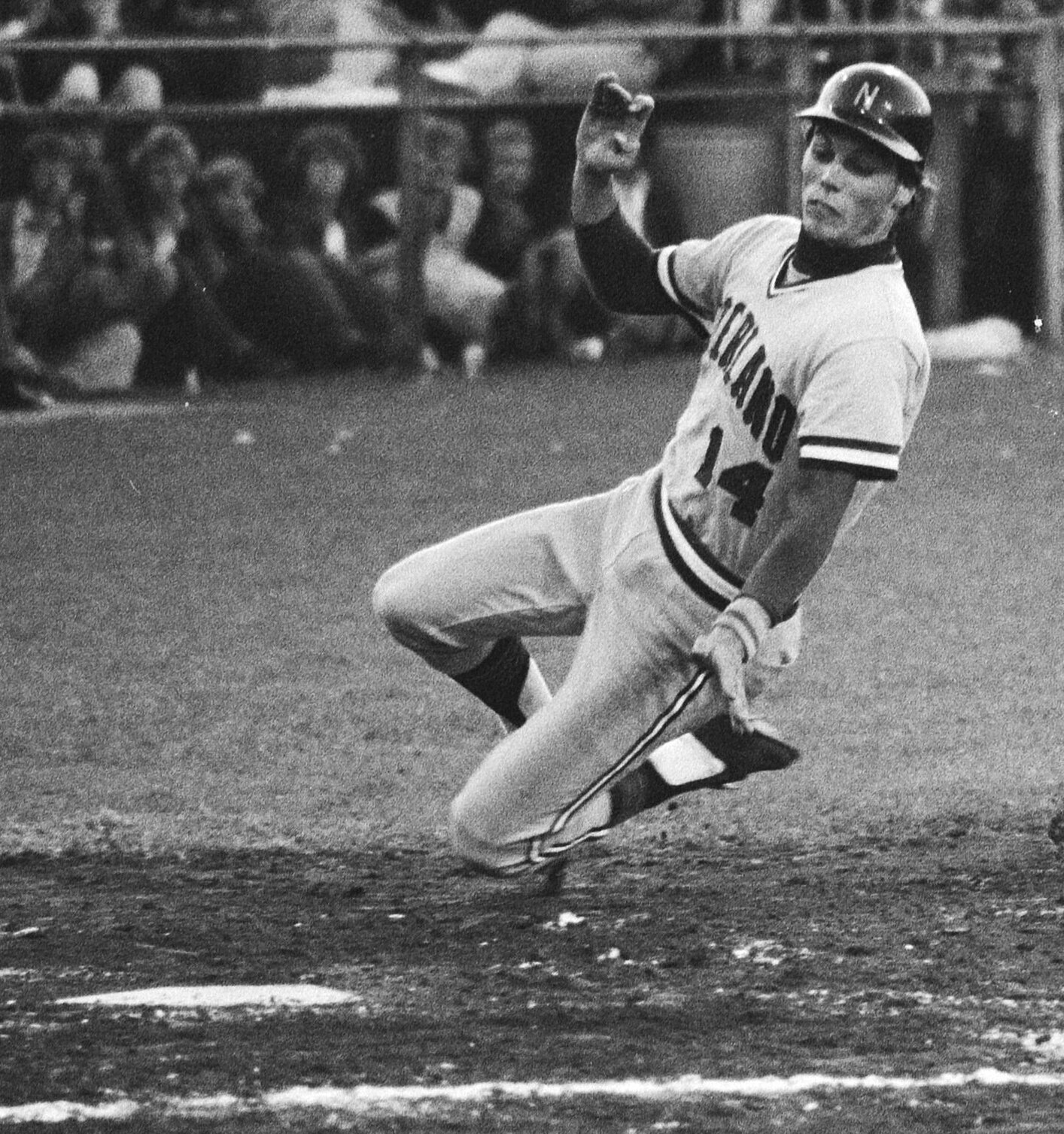
Tournament MVP Charles Urbanus Jr.

- Most valuable player: (Netherlands) Charles Urbanus Jr.
- Best pitcher: (Italy) Federico Martone
- Best hitter: (Italy) Mike Romano
- Best catcher: (Italy) Giorgio Castelli
- Best coach: (Italy) Bill Arce
- Best batting average: (West Germany) Roland Hoffmann, .500
