= 1985 European Baseball Championship =

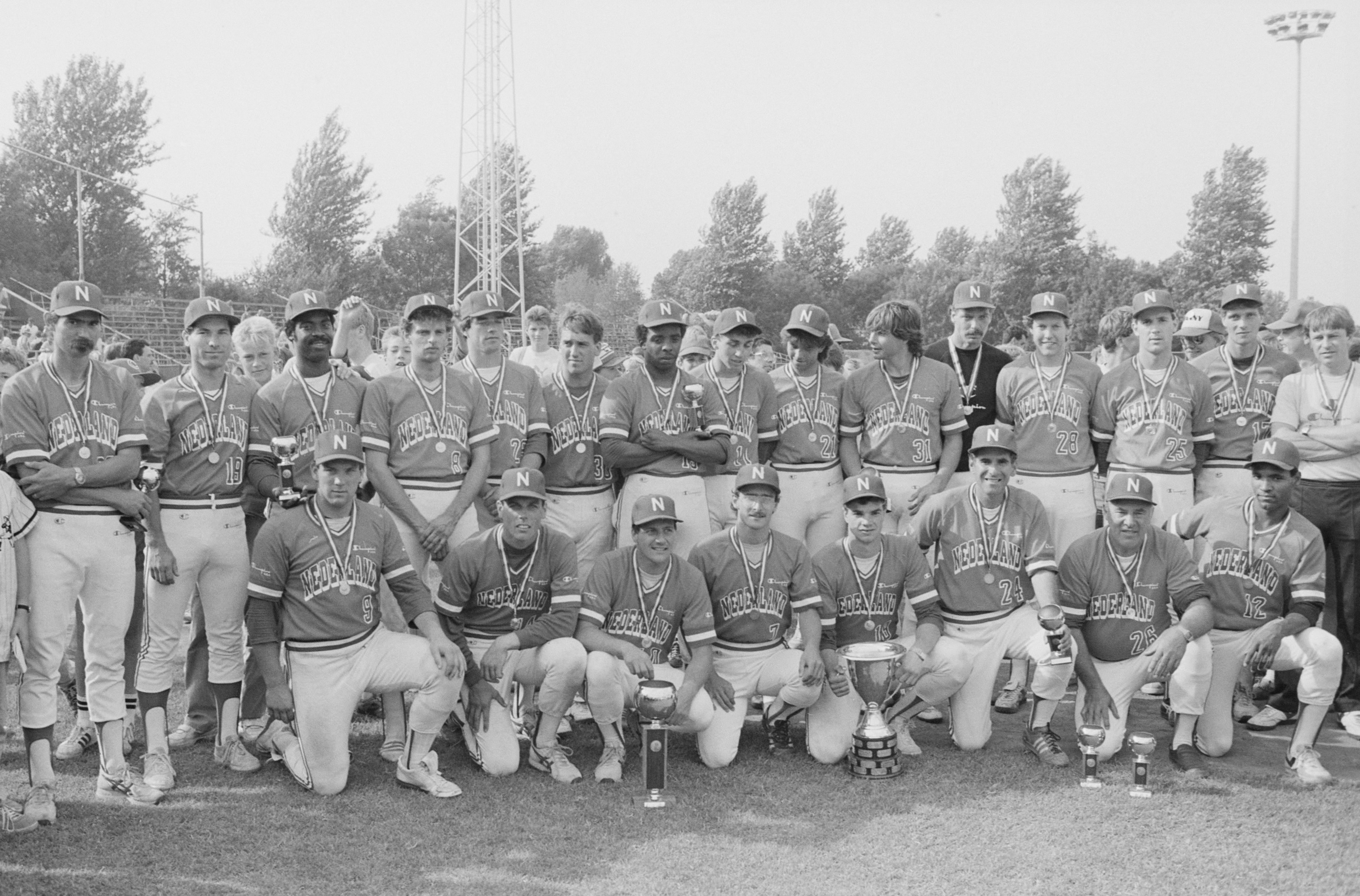
- The victorious Netherlands national team in Haarlem

Tournament details
- Country: Netherlands
- Dates: 17–26 July
- Teams: 6
- Defending champions: Italy

Final positions
- Champions: Netherlands
- Runners-up: Italy
- Third place: Belgium
- Fourth place: Sweden

Tournament statistics
- Games played: 24
- Best BA: (Netherlands) Judsel Baranco (.593)
- Most HRs: (Italy) Roberto Bianchi

Awards
- MVP: (Netherlands) Marcel Joost

The 1985 European Baseball Championship was held in Haarlem and Eindhoven, the Netherlands and was won by the Netherlands, which swept Italy in a four-game championship series. Third-place Belgium won all three group games among the bottom-four teams. San Marino, competing for the first time since 1971 championship, lost all 8 games. The top three teams qualified for the 1986 Amateur World Series, also held in the Netherlands.

The Italian team fielded fewer Italian American players, which weakened the team, particularly their pitching.

The tournament attracted 50,000 spectators, exceeding organizers' goal of 30,000 to fund the tournament.

== Standings ==
Pos.	Team	Record
1	Netherlands	9–0
2	Italy	4–5
3	Belgium	6–2
4	Sweden	4–4
5	Spain	2–6
6	San Marino	0–8

== Awards ==
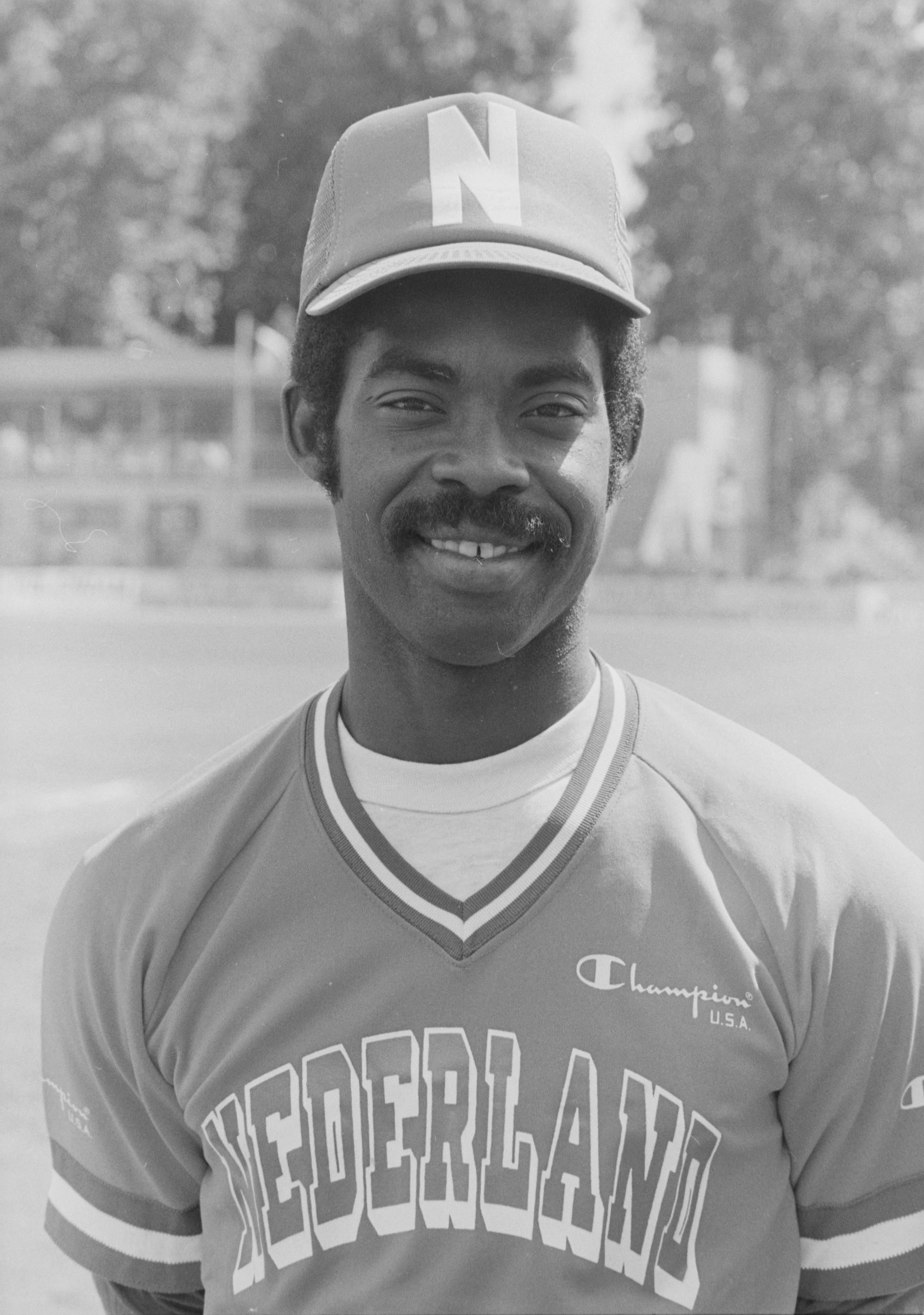
Judsel Baranco led the tournament with a .593 batting average

- Most valuable player (Netherlands) Marcel Joost
- Best hitter: (Netherlands) Judsel Baranco, .593 batting average
- Best pitcher: (Belgium) Frank Lauwers or (Netherlands) Jan Hijzelendoorn
- Most home runs: (Italy) Roberto Bianchi
- Most spectacular player: (Netherlands) Jacky Jakoba
