= 1969 European Baseball Championship =

Tournament details
- Country: Italy
- Dates: 27 July–3 August
- Teams: 7
- Defending champions: Belgium

Final positions
- Champions: Netherlands (8th title)
- Runners-up: Italy
- Third place: Spain
- Fourth place: West Germany

Tournament statistics
- Best BA: (Netherlands) Hudson John (.461)
- Most HRs: (Netherlands) Hamilton Richardson (2)

Awards
- MVP: (Netherlands) Hamilton Richardson

The 1969 European Baseball Championship was held in Wiesbaden, Germany and was won by the Netherlands. Italy finished as runner-up. The tournament, held at Lindsey Air Station, had two groups, with defending champion Belgium and Italy and the Netherlands, who both skipped the 1967 championship, in the top group and four teams in the bottom group. West Germany defeated Belgium in the only cross-group game in the tournament. After the tournament, Spain, which went undefeated in the lower group, requested that the two-tiered format be abolished.

An American military team, the Wiesbaden Flyers, and a team from South Africa also attended the tournament.

Italian players reportedly chanted "Antilles, Antilles," objecting to the Dutch team's use of ballplayers from the Netherlands Antilles, which included most valuable player Hamilton Richardson.

== Standings ==
Pos.	Team	Record
1	Netherlands	3–0
2	Italy	2–1
3	Spain	3–0
4	West Germany	3–1
5	Belgium	0–5
6	Sweden	1–2
7	France	0–3

== Awards ==
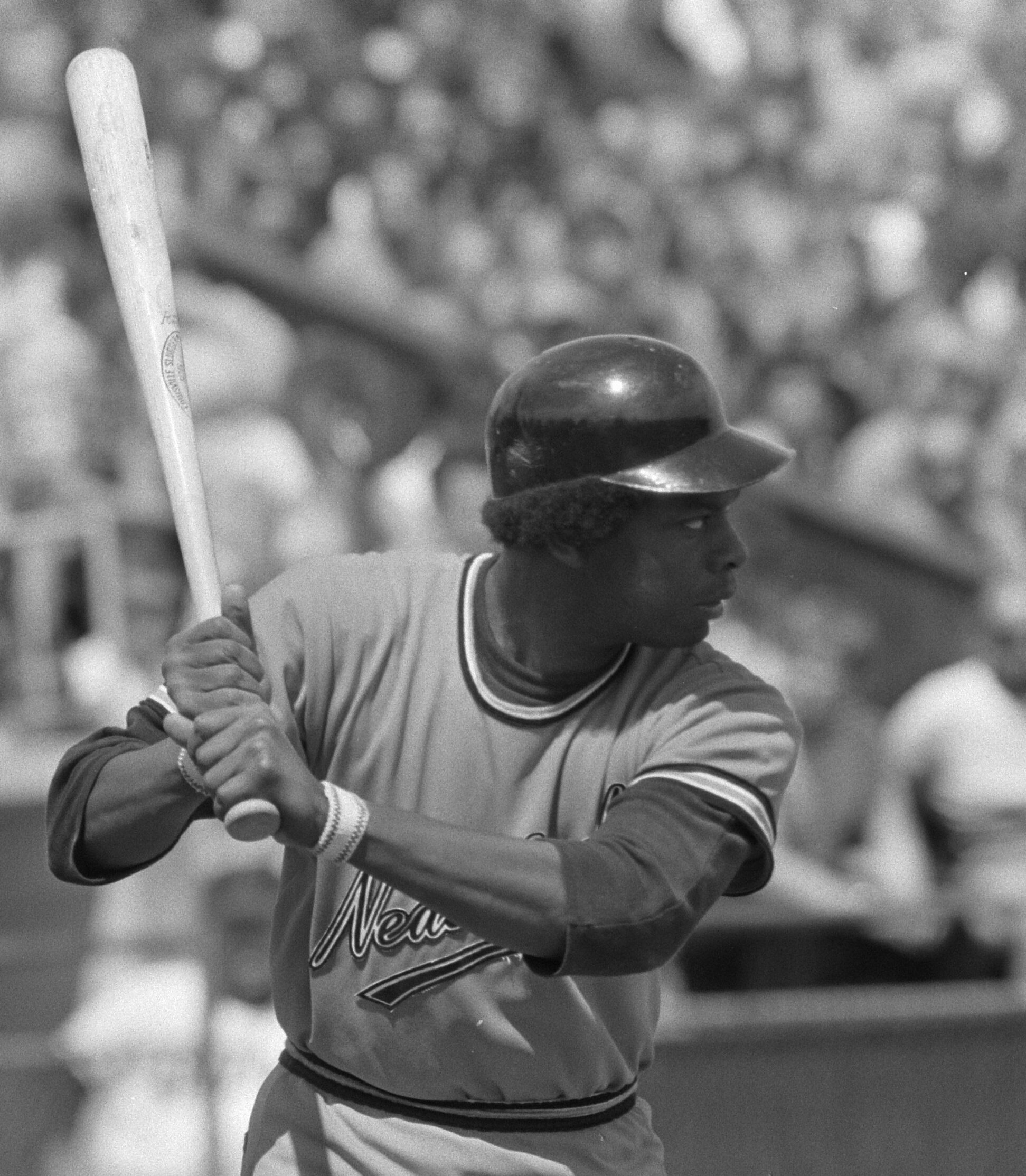
Hamilton Richardson, tournament MVP

- Most valuable player: (Netherlands) Hamilton Richardson
- Best pitcher: (Netherlands) Rudy Dom
- Highest batting average: (Netherlands) Hudson John, .461
- Most home runs: (Netherlands) Richardson, 2.
- Best sportsmanship: (Belgium) Joske Robijn
- Best manager: (Spain) Gregorio Solís
