= 1967 European Baseball Championship =

Tournament details
- Country: Belgium
- Dates: 6–12 August
- Teams: 5

Final positions
- Champions: Belgium (1st title)
- Runners-up: Great Britain
- Third place: West Germany
- Fourth place: Spain

Tournament statistics
- Games played: 10
- Best BA: (Belgium) Edgar Vaerendonck (.643)

Awards
- MVP: (Germany) Roland Hoffmann

The 1967 European Baseball Championship was held in Antwerp, Belgium and was won by Belgium. Great Britain, in its first continental championship, finished in second place. It was the best-ever finish for either team, with the British also finishing second in 2007 and 2023.

The two dominant European teams, the Netherlands and Italy, winners of every other title from 1956 through 2023, did not compete. Both teams had left the Confederation of European Baseball over how the federation's president was elected. Both countries returned for the 1969 championship.

It was the last edition of the tournament held in Belgium until 2025, when Antwerp hosted part of the first round of the championship.

== Standings ==
Pos.	Team	Record
1	Belgium	4–0
2	Great Britain	3–1
3	West Germany	2–2
4	Spain	2–2
5	Sweden	0–4

== Awards ==
- Most valuable player: (Germany) Roland Hoffmann
- Best hitter: (Belgium) Edgar Vaerendonck, .643 batting average
- Best pitcher: (Belgium) Edmond van Trichtveldt
