= Ricardo Hernández =

Venezuelan baseball player (born 1988)

- Pitcher
- Born: January 23, 1988 (age 38); Caracas, Venezuela
- Bats: Left Throws: Left
- Stats at Baseball Reference

Ricardo Hernández (born January 23, 1988) is a Venezuelan former professional baseball player.

He signed as an amateur free agent with the Florida Marlins in 2006. After a year in the Venezuelan Summer League and another in the Dominican Summer League he moved to the U.S. and played for the Gulf Coast Marlins in 2008 and the Jupiter Hammerheads in 2009. He moved to Spain and joined the División de Honor de Béisbol. After winning the league championship in 2011 (with a record of 15-0 and a 0.82 ERA in 17 games) he jumped to the Italian Baseball League in 2012 to play for Danesi Nettuno.

He played for the Spain national baseball team in the 2013 World Baseball Classic and the 2019 European Baseball Championship. He then played for the team at the Africa/Europe 2020 Olympic Qualification tournament, in Italy in September 2019.
