= 1958 European Baseball Championship =

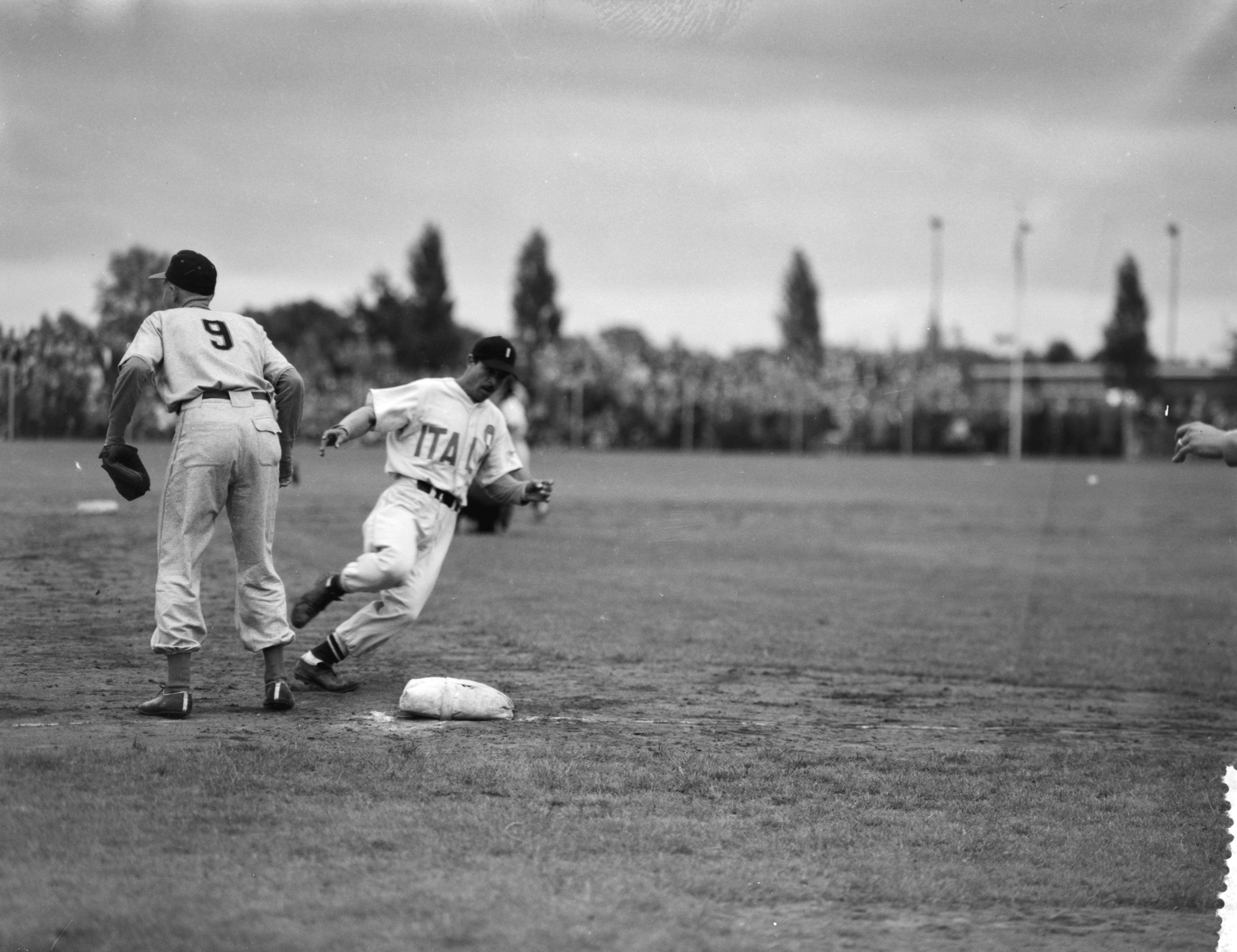
- An Italian baserunner rounds third base during the tournament

Tournament details
- Country: Netherlands
- City: Amsterdam
- Teams: 6
- Defending champions: Netherlands

Final positions
- Champions: Netherlands (3rd title)
- Runners-up: Italy
- Third place: West Germany
- Fourth place: Belgium

Tournament statistics
- Games played: 10

The 1958 European Baseball Championship was held in Amsterdam, the Netherlands. The Netherlands won the championship, going undefeated for the third year in a row. Italy finished in second for the second consecutive championship.

The Dutch needed extra innings to defeat Italy and West Germany in its first two games, with outfielder Gé Oosterbaan making a diving catch in the 12th inning to prevent Italy from scoring. The Dutch won a rematch against Italy for the title 5–2. The championship was a double-elimination tournament, which meant the Netherlands only played twice to reach the championship game while Italy played five games. Because of the increased workload, Italy did not start the tournament's top pitcher, Giulio Glorioso, in the title game, which was attended by 10,000 people and featured a fireworks display.

Ron Fraser managed West Germany and was named the best manager of the tournament. The Netherlands hired him after the tournament. Fraser would later coach the Miami Hurricanes and be inducted into the American College Baseball Hall of Fame and Dutch baseball hall of fame.

France, after missing the 1957 championship, was blown out in both of its games, losing to Spain and Belgium, two teams that lost all of their other games.

== Standings ==
Pos.	Team	Record	RS	RA
1	Netherlands	3–0	15	10
2	Italy	4–2	38	19
3	West Germany	1–2	10	10
4	Belgium	1–2	20	13
5	Spain	1–2	32	23
6	France	0–2	6	46

== Awards ==
- Best pitcher: (Italy) Giulio Glorioso
- Best hitter: (Netherlands) Piet de Nieuwe
- Best catcher: (Italy) Gigi Cameroni
- Best infielder: (Italy) Giovanni Macri
- Best outfielder: (West Germany) Dieter Heller
- Best manager: (West Germany) Ron Fraser
- Best umpire: (Italy) Mario Ottaviani

All-Star team
Position	Name	Team
Pitcher	Giulio Glorioso	Italy
Pitcher	Han Urbanus	Netherlands
Pitcher	Jürgen Helmig	West Germany
Catcher	Gigi Cameroni	Italy
Catcher	Joop Geurts	Netherlands
First base	Juan Comellas	Spain
Second base	Henk Keulemans	Netherlands
Third base	Karl Phillipp	West Germany
Shortstop	Giovanni Macri	Italy
Outfielders	Pueyo III	Spain
Outfielders	Dieter Heller	West Germany
Outfielders	Gé Oosterbaan	Netherlands
Pinch hitters	Piet de Nieuwe	Netherlands
Pinch hitters	Giampiero Faraone	Italy
