= Spain national baseball team =

Information
- Country: Spain
- Federation: Royal Spanish Baseball and Softball Federation
- Confederation: WBSC Europe
- Manager: Nelson Prada

WBSC ranking
- Current: 23 (26 October 2026)
- Highest: 16 (December 2012)
- Lowest: 26 (December 2018)

Olympic Games
- Appearances: 1 (first in 1992)
- Best result: 8th (1992)

World Baseball Classic
- Appearances: 1 (first in 2013)
- Best result: 15th (2013)

World Cup
- Appearances: 4 (first in 1988)
- Best result: 12th (1988, 2009)

Intercontinental Cup
- Appearances: 2 (first in 1991)

European Championship
- Appearances: 33 (first in 1954)
- Best result: (gold) 1st (2 times, most recent in 2023)

The Spain national baseball team (Spanish: Selección Española de Béisbol) is the national team of Spain. It is governed by the Royal Spanish Baseball and Softball Federation. It is a member nation of the WBSC Europe.

== History ==
The Spanish national team won the European Baseball Championship in 1955. In 1992, it took part in the Olympic Games, held in Barcelona.

In 2013, they qualified for the first time for the World Baseball Classic. They lost all three games against Puerto Rico, the Dominican Republic, and Venezuela.

Spain competed in the 2019 European Baseball Championship, coming in third to win a bronze medal. Among the players who competed for it were Engel Beltré, Rhiner Cruz, Ricardo Hernández, Fernando Martínez, Leslie Nacar, Antonio Noguera, and Blake Ochoa. With this achievement, Spain qualified again for the final qualification stage of the 2020 Summer Olympics, but it failed to qualify by finishing fourth.

In 2023, Spain became European champions again at the European Championship, 68 years after their first title.

== Results and fixtures ==
The following is a list of professional baseball match results currently active in the latest version of the WBSC World Rankings, as well as any future matches that have been scheduled.

Legend

Win Lose Void or postponed Fixture

=== 2023 ===
Friendly	19 September	France	2–6	Spain	Pamplona, Spain
Friendly	17:00 UTC+2		Boxscore		Attendance: 300

Friendly	20 September	Spain	12–2 (F/7)	France	Pamplona, Spain
Friendly	17:00 UTC+2		Boxscore		Attendance: 150

Friendly	21 September	France	5–3	Spain	Pamplona, Spain
Friendly	10:30 UTC+2		Boxscore		Attendance: 90

=== 2025 ===
World Baseball Classic Q	21 February	Spain	12–5	Chinese Taipei	Taipei, Taiwan
World Baseball Classic Q	19:00 UTC+8	WP: Elián Leyva; HR: Gabriel Lino	Boxscore	LP: Yu-Hung Chen; HR: Yu Chang	Attendance: 35,325; Umpires: Ty Krauss

World Baseball Classic Q	22 February	Spain	1–2 (F/10)	Nicaragua	Taipei, Taiwan
World Baseball Classic Q	12:00 UTC+8	LP: Rhiner Cruz; HR: Carlos Colmenarez	Boxscore	WP: Yeris Gonzalez; HR: Brandon Leytón	Attendance: 15,015; Umpires: Ben Phillips

World Baseball Classic Q	23 February	South Africa	1–9	Spain	Taipei, Taiwan
World Baseball Classic Q	12:00 UTC+8	LP: Vince Deyzel	Boxscore	WP: Pablo Guillén; HR: Rusber Estrada, Jesús Ustariz	Attendance: 15,385; Umpires: Yoshiharu Yamaguchi

World Baseball Classic Q	25 February	Chinese Taipei	6–3	Spain	Taipei, Taiwan
World Baseball Classic Q	19:00 UTC+8	WP: Chen Zhong-Ao Zhuang; Sv: Jyun-Yue Tseng	Boxscore	LP: Ramón Rosso; HR: Rusber Estrada	Attendance: 35,768; Umpires: Mark Stewart Jr.

European Championship GS	20 September	Sweden	0–15 (F/5)	Spain	Rotterdam, Netherlands
European Championship GS	20:30 UTC+2		Boxscore		Attendance: 81

European Championship GS	21 September	Spain	1–9	Czech Republic	Rotterdam, Netherlands
European Championship GS	19:30 UTC+2		Boxscore		Attendance: 200

European Championship GS	22 September	Germany	2–4	Spain	Rotterdam, Netherlands
European Championship GS	14:00 UTC+2		Boxscore		Attendance: 353

European Championship R16	24 September	Australia	0–10 (F/7)	Spain	Rotterdam, Netherlands
European Championship R16	18:00 UTC+2		Boxscore		Attendance: 237

European Championship QF	25 September	Spain	7–0	Great Britain	Rotterdam, Netherlands
European Championship QF	18:00 UTC+2		Boxscore		Attendance: 133

European Championship SF	26 September	Spain	1–6	Netherlands	Rotterdam, Netherlands
European Championship SF	19:30 UTC+2		Boxscore		Attendance: 2,463

European Championship 3rd	27 September	Czech Republic	9–2	Spain	Rotterdam, Netherlands
European Championship 3rd	14:00 UTC+2		Boxscore		Attendance: 1,600

=== 2026 ===
WBSC Premier12 Q	9 October	Germany	2–3 (F/10)	Spain	Barcelona, Spain
WBSC Premier12 Q	19:00 UTC+2	LP: Noah Lindt; HR: Yannic Walther, Finn Bergmann	Boxscore	WP: Junior Bonilla	Attendance: 447

WBSC Premier12 Q	10 October	Spain	5–2	Italy	Barcelona, Spain
WBSC Premier12 Q	19:00 UTC+2	WP: Jose Gómez	Boxscore	LP: Mattia Aldegheri	Attendance: 824

WBSC Premier12 Q	11 October	Spain	3–8	Colombia	Barcelona, Spain
WBSC Premier12 Q	19:00 UTC+2	LP: Pablo Guillén	Boxscore	WP: Julio Vivas; HR: Jesús Marriaga	Attendance: 642

== Coaching staff ==
Position	Name
(Venezuela) Nelson Prada	Manager
(Spain) Néstor Pérez	Bench coach
(Venezuela) Juan Rincón	Pitching coach
(Venezuela) Candelario Díaz	First base coach
(Spain) Félix Manuel Cano	Third base coach
(Spain) Manuel Olivera	Bullpen coach
(Russia) Ian Peres	Bullpen catcher

== Tournament records ==
=== World Baseball Classic ===
World Baseball Classic record							Qualification record			
Year	Round	Position	W	L	RS	RA	W	L	RS	RA
2006	did not enter						No qualifiers held			
2009	did not enter						No qualifiers held			
(Puerto Rico) 2013	Round 1	15th	0	3	9	20	3	1	32	14
2017	did not qualify						0	2	5	14
2023	did not qualify						2	2	36	24
2026	did not qualify						2	2	25	14
Total	Round 1	1/6	0	3	9	20	7	7	98	66

=== Olympic Games ===
Summer Olympics record							Qualification
Year	Round	Position	W	L	RS	RA	Qualification
1992	Preliminary	8th	1	6	15	85	Host country
1996	did not qualify						4th, 1995 European Baseball Championship
2000	did not qualify						5th, 1999 European Baseball Championship
2004	did not qualify						2003 European Baseball Championship
2008	did not qualify						2007 European Baseball Championship; 7th, Final Qualifying Tournament
2020	did not qualify						2019 European Baseball Championship; 4th, Final Qualifying Tournament
Total	1/5		1	6	15	85	

=== European Baseball Championship ===
Year	Position	Pld	W	L
(Spain) 1954	2nd	2	1	1
(Spain) 1955	1st	4 (Note: One game drawn)	3	0
(Italy) 1956	4th	4	1	3
(Germany) 1957	4th	4	1	3
(Netherlands) 1958	5th	3	1	2
(Spain) 1960	3rd	3	1	2
(Netherlands) 1962	3rd	5	3	2
(Italy) 1964	3rd	4	2	2
(Spain) 1965	4th	4	1	3
(Belgium) 1967	4th	4	1	3
(Germany) 1969	3rd	3	2	1
(Italy) 1971	6th	5	2	3
(Netherlands) 1973	3rd	11	5	6
(Spain) 1975	4th	7	3	4
(Netherlands) 1977	4th	6	1	5
(Netherlands) 1979	did not qualify			
(Netherlands) 1981	did not qualify			
(Italy) 1983	4th	8	3	5
(Netherlands) 1985	5th	8	2	6
(Spain) 1987	3rd	10	5	5
(France) 1989	3rd	9	5	4
(Italy) 1991	3rd	9	5	4
(Sweden) 1993	5th	8	6	2
(Netherlands) 1995	4th	10	5	5
(Italy) 1997	3rd	9	5	4
(Netherlands) 1999	5th	8	5	3
(Germany) 2001	6th	8	3	5
(Netherlands) 2003	3rd	8	6	2
(Netherlands) 2005	3rd	9	7	2
(Spain) 2007	3rd	8	6	2
(Germany) 2010	9th	5	2	3
(Netherlands) 2012	3rd	8	4	4
(Czech Republic) 2014	3rd	8	6	2
(Netherlands) 2016	2nd	9	7	2
(Germany) 2019	3rd	8	6	2
(Italy) 2021	4th	6	4	2
(Czech Republic) 2023	1st	6	6	0
(Netherlands) 2025	4th	7	4	3
Total	36/38	238	130	107

=== At Baseball World Cup ===
Year	Position	Pld	W	L
(Italy) 1988	12th	11	0	11
(Italy) 1998	14th	7	2	5
(Netherlands) 2005	14th	8	2	6
(Taiwan) 2007	13th	7	2	5
(Europe) 2009	12th	10	3	7
Total	5/39	43	9	34

=== At Intercontinental Cup ===
Year	Position	Pld	W	L
1991				
1997				
Total	2/17			

=== European Championships - Junior ===
- Gold Medal (1 time)

2022.

- Silver Medal (4 times)

1990, 1991, 1996 and 2001.

- Bronze Medal (11 times)

1974, 1976, 1982, 1984, 1986, 1987, 1989, 1993, 1994, 1995 and 2005.

=== European Championships - Cadet ===
- Silver Medal (3 times)

1981, 1992 and 2004.

- Bronze Medal (3 times)

1979, 2000 and 2002.

== Technical staff ==
=== Current technical staff ===
Position	Name
Manager	(Spain) Nelson Prada
Bench Coach	(Spain) Néstor Pérez
First Base Coach	(Venezuela) Candelario Díaz
Third Base Coach	(Spain) Félix Manuel Cano
Pitching Coach	(Venezuela) Juan Rincón
Bullpen Coach	(Spain) Manuel Olivera
Bullpen Catcher	(Russia) Ian Peres

=== Managerial history ===
The Spain national baseball team has been led by a diverse succession of managers since its first participation in the European Baseball Championship in 1954. In the early years, the team was guided exclusively by Spanish-born managers, with Isaac Llamazares among the first to lead the national side. As the program grew, Spain began attracting foreign managers, reflecting the team's increasing international ambitions.

Notable foreign managers include Cuban legend Sungo Carrera in 1975, Netherlands Antilles native Hamilton Richardson in 1983, and Italian Giuseppe Guilizzoni from 1988 to 1989. American manager Jake Molina served two separate stints and remains one of the longest-serving foreign managers in program history. Italian Mauro Mazzotti oversaw the team's most significant achievement of the modern era, guiding Spain to its first ever World Baseball Classic appearance in 2013.

Venezuelan veteran Luis Sojo, a former MLB infielder, brought considerable professional pedigree to the role in 2019. His successor, fellow Venezuelan Nelson Prada, led Spain to its first European Championship title since 1955 in 2023, establishing the team as one of the premier baseball nations in Europe.

- (Spain) Isaac Llamazares (1954)
- (Spain) José Martínez (1955–1956)
- (Spain) Braulio García (1957)
- (Spain) Alejo Carbonell (1958-1959)
- (Spain) Samuel Corillo (1960)
- (Spain) Antonio García (1962–1963)
- (Philippines) Manuel Aurelio Rodríguez (1964–1965)
- (Spain) Andrés Pueyo (1967)
- (Cuba) Ramón Valdés (1969)
- (Spain) Gregorio Solís (1971)
- (Sweden) Erik Lundqvist (1972)
- (Spain) Augusto Fernández Flores (1973)
- (Spain) Diego Sánchez Ruiz (1974)
- (Cuba) Sungo Carrera (1975)
- (Spain) Francisco Molina Vega (1977–1978)
- (Cuba) Armando Roque (1979)
- (Spain) Rafael Herrero Campos (1980–1981)
- (Netherlands Antilles) Hamilton Richardson (1983)
- (Italy) Giuseppe Guilizzoni (1988–1989)
- (United States) Jake Molina (1991–1993)
- (Spain) Juan Perez (1995)
- (Nicaragua) Ramiro Toruño (1997–1998)
- (Spain) Carlos Mendoza Reyes (1999–2000)
- (Netherlands) Pieter van den Berg (2001)
- (Japan) Kenji Yamamoto (2002)
- (Nicaragua) Ramiro Toruño (2003)
- (Canada) Brian MacLeod (2004)
- (United States) Jake Molina (2005–2008)
- (Italy) Mauro Mazzotti (2009–2014)
- (Puerto Rico) Carlos Delgado Rosario (2015)
- (United States) Manny Crespo (2016) (2017 World Baseball Classic qualification)
- (United States) Paco Figueroa (2016) (2016 European Baseball Championship)
- (Germany) Markus Reinhardt (2017)
- (Dominican Republic) Candelario Díaz (2018)
- (Venezuela) Luis Sojo (2019-2020)
- (Venezuela) Nelson Prada (2021–present)

== 2026 World Baseball Classic Qualifier roster ==
Spain roster – 2026 World Baseball Classic Qualification
Players		Coaches
Pitchers: 32 Daniel Álvarez; 12 Fernando Báez; 23 Jorge Balboa; 21 Vicente Campos; 55 Rhiner Cruz; 3 Anderson De León; 20 Yeudy García; 27 Pablo Guillén; 53 Elián Leyva; 37 Yoanner Negrín; 36 Andrés Pérez; 42 Orlando Rodríguez; 26 Ramón Rosso; 39 Elio Silva	Catchers: 2 Andrés Angulo; 18 Rusber Estrada; 40 Gabriel Lino; Infielders: 1 Carlos Colmenárez; 11 Wander Encarnación; 5 Yancarlo Franco; 24 Edgar Rondón; 16 Jesús Ustariz; 19 Edison Valerio; Outfielders: 7 Engel Beltré; 29 Frank Hernández; 10 Daniel Jiménez; 14 Chris Kwitzer; 9 Félix Stevens	Manager: 33 Nelson Prada; Coaches: 4 Nestor Pérez (Bench); 28 Manuel Olivera (Pitching); 30 Aritz García (First Base); 8 Candelario Díaz (Third Base); 6 Eduardo Domínguez (Bullpen)

== See also ==
- Baseball in Spain
