= 1977 European Baseball Championship =

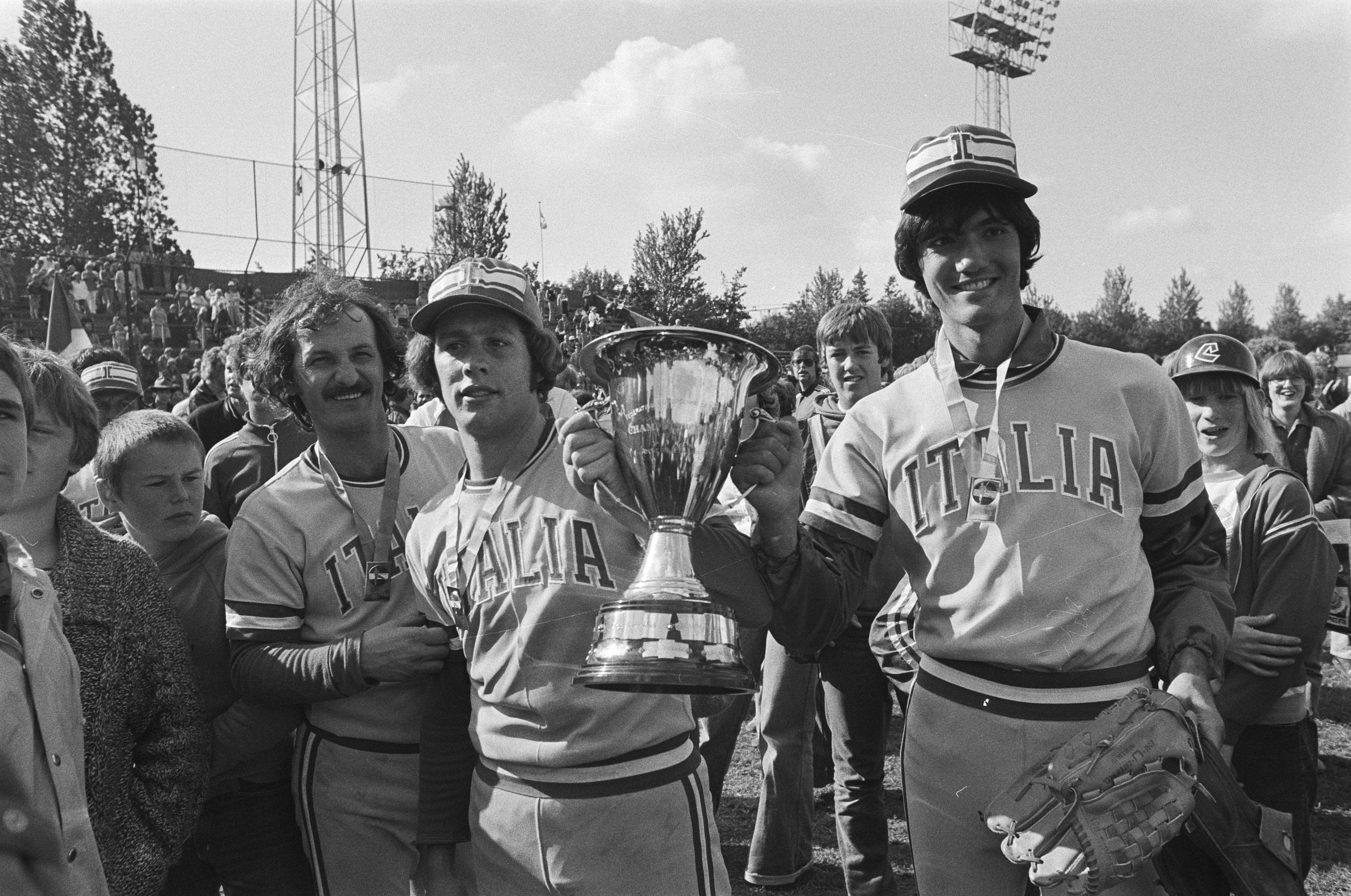
- Italy players holding a championship trophy in Haarlem

Tournament details
- Country: The Netherlands
- City: Haarlem
- Dates: 10–15 July
- Teams: 5
- Defending champions: Italy

Final positions
- Champions: Italy
- Runners-up: Netherlands
- Third place: Belgium
- Fourth place: Spain

Awards
- MVP: (Italy) Ted Alfieri

The 1977 European Baseball Championship was held in Haarlem, the Netherlands. Italy won its second consecutive championship. The Netherlands also repeated as runner-up. Italy clinched its championship with a 1–0 no-hitter win over the Netherlands.

Future Los Angeles Dodgers owner Peter O'Malley attended the championship. More than 40,000 fans attended the tournament, with more than 6,000 at the final game at Pim Mulier Stadium.

West Germany chose not to attend the event due to a disagreement with European tournament organizers. As a result, the country was banned for five years and did not return to the continental championship until 1987.

== Standings ==
Pos.	Team	Record
1	Italy	6–2
2	Netherlands	5–3
3	Belgium	4–2
4	Spain	1–5
5	Sweden	1–5

== Awards ==
- Most valuable player: (Italy) Ted Alfieri (hit three home runs)
- Best hitter: (Italy) Rick Landucci (hit three home runs, also 1–0 as a pitcher)
- Best pitcher: (Netherlands) Bertil Haage
- Press award (manager): (Netherlands) Ernie Myers
