= Roberto Bianchi =

Roberto Bianchi is the name of:

- Roberto Bianchi Montero (1907–1986), Italian actor
- Roberto Bianchi Pelliser (born 1966), Brazilian football player and coach
- Roberto Bianchi (character), fictional character in the Eternal Darkness video game
