= 1962 European Baseball Championship =

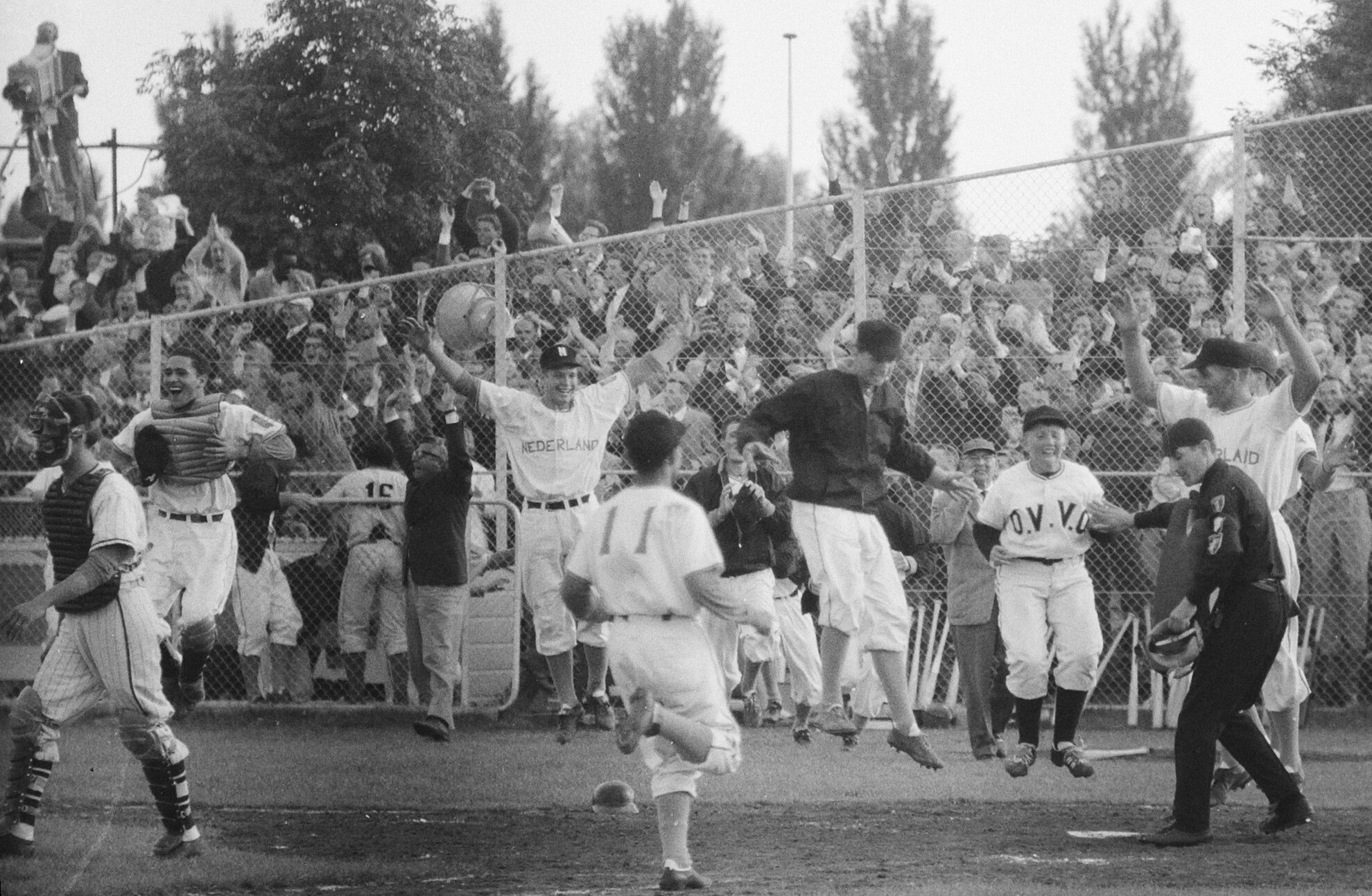
- The Netherlands team celebrating a home run during the championship

Tournament details
- Country: Netherlands
- City: Amsterdam
- Dates: 21–29 July
- Teams: 7
- Defending champions: Netherlands

Final positions
- Champions: Netherlands (5th title)
- Runners-up: Italy
- Third place: Spain
- Fourth place: Belgium

Tournament statistics
- Games played: 15
- Best BA: (Spain) Licesio Fernández (.636)

Awards
- MVP: (Netherlands) Leo Kops

The 1962 European Baseball Championship was held in Amsterdam, the Netherlands at the end of July. The Netherlands, for the fifth consecutive tournament, was the undefeated champion. Italy finished second for the third consecutive tournament. The tournament had seven teams, the most in the tournament's history and not surpassed until 1971.

Ron Fraser, future U.S. college baseball and Dutch baseball hall of famer, managed the Netherlands and was named the best manager of the tournament.

The Netherlands had to come from behind to defeat Italy, 9–4, with Rob Hoffmann, later named the best pitcher of the tournament, replacing starter Herman Beidschat, who suffered from the flu leading up to the game.

France suffered the first forfeit in tournament history, when a French player left the game following a disagreement with the team's captain, leaving the team with only 8 players. France had been trailing West Germany 30–0, with the forfeit lowering the margin of defeat to 9–0. Sweden made its debut in the tournament, losing all four games.

The Dutch baseball federation said the tournament cost 500,000 guilder but was profitable enough to fund two future tournaments.

== Format ==
Seven teams competed in two groups, which both competed in a round-robin tournament. The top two teams in each group advanced to the final round while the remaining three teams faced off in a classification group. These two groups again competed in a round-robin tournament to determine the final standings.

== Standings ==
Pos.	Team	Record	RS	RA
1	Netherlands	5–0	65	11
2	Italy	3–1	58	11
3	Spain	3–2	51	36
4	Belgium	1–3	25	52
5	West Germany	2–2	49	34
6	France	1–3	35	71
7	Sweden	0–4	27	69

== Awards ==
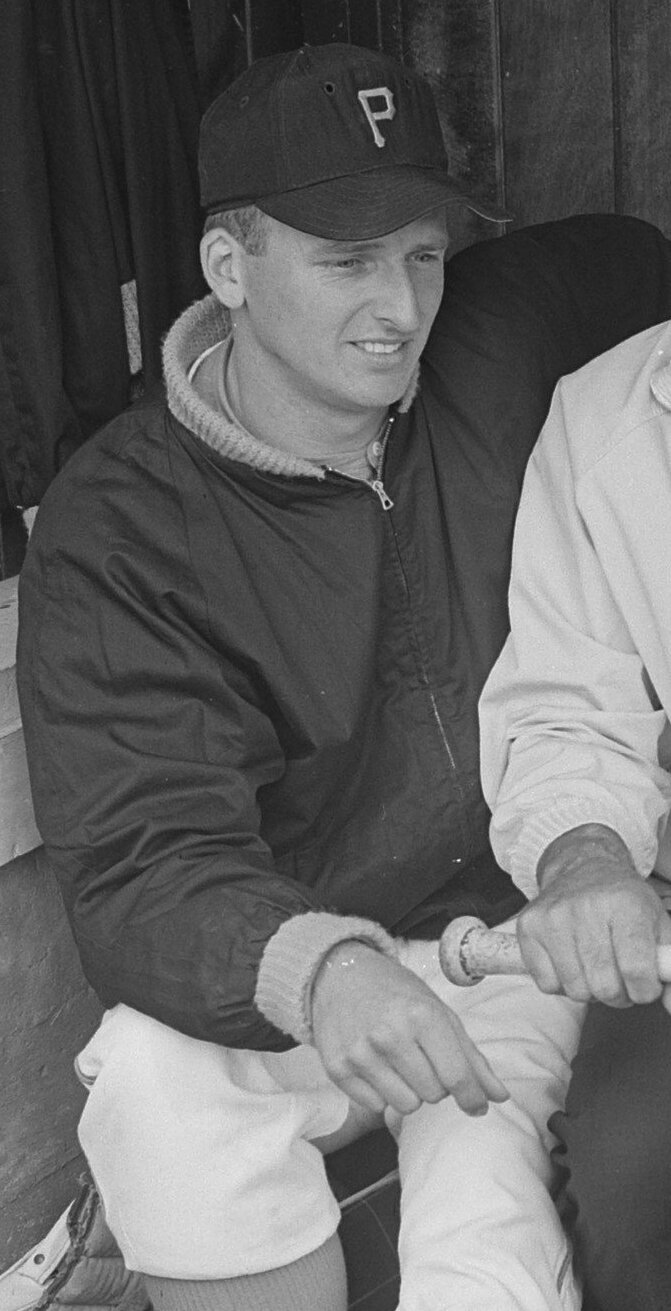
Leo Kops was the most valuable player of the tournament

- Most valuable player: (Netherlands) Leo Kops
- Best pitcher: (Netherlands) Rob Hoffmann
- Best batting average: (Spain) Licesio Fernández, .636
- Best catcher: (Italy) Gigi Camaroni
- Best manager: (Netherlands) Ron Fraser
- Best umpire: (Italy) Umberto Scirman
