= 1960 European Baseball Championship =

Tournament details
- Country: Spain
- City: Barcelona
- Dates: 22–25 September
- Teams: 4
- Defending champions: Netherlands

Final positions
- Champions: Netherlands (4th title)
- Runners-up: Italy
- Third place: Spain
- Fourth place: West Germany

Tournament statistics
- Games played: 6
- Best BA: (Italy) Angelo Novali (.455)

The 1960 European Baseball Championship was held at the Montjuich Municipal Stadium in Barcelona, Spain. The Netherlands went undefeated for the fourth consecutive tournament. Italy finished second for the second straight championship.

The formerly annual tournament was not held in 1959. Belgium was originally scheduled to host, but withdrew due to financial concerns in late 1958. Spain, West Germany, and Italy also declined. The Netherlands considered hosting the event. In February 1959, the European federation voted to make the tournament a biennial event. In January 1960, the federation moved the tournament from the summer to September to avoid conflicting with the 1960 Summer Olympics in Rome. Barcelona hosted the 1955 championship and organizers still had not fully paid off their debt from that tournament.

While Spanish organizers suggested early in the year that Belgium, France, Tunisia, England, Sweden, or Poland might attend, only four teams competed, tied for the fewest since the initial championship in 1954.

In the decisive game, the Netherlands beat Italy 1–0, scoring an unearned run without getting a hit in the fifth inning. Otherwise, pitchers Giulio Glorioso and Herman Beidschat kept both teams from scoring. Beidschat was named the tournament's best pitcher. Both teams then beat Spain and West Germany by at least six runs.

The tournament featured poor hitting, with no team batting average topping .178, and poor fielding, as teams made between 6 and 18 errors in their three games.

Ron Fraser, who managed West Germany in the 1958, served as manager of the Netherlands. He broke a shinbone during sliding practice in a team training session. After the tournament, Fraser negotiated with the Dutch prime minister to increase his salary to $19,000 (equivalent to $205,000 in 2025). The other three teams also had American coaches. Sitting U.S. president Dwight Eisenhower was named the honorary president of the Spanish baseball federation.

== Standings ==
Pos.	Team	Record	RS	RA
1	Netherlands	3–0	24	1
2	Italy	2–1	14	3
3	Spain	1–2	6	19
4	West Germany	0–3	3	24

== Awards and statistics ==
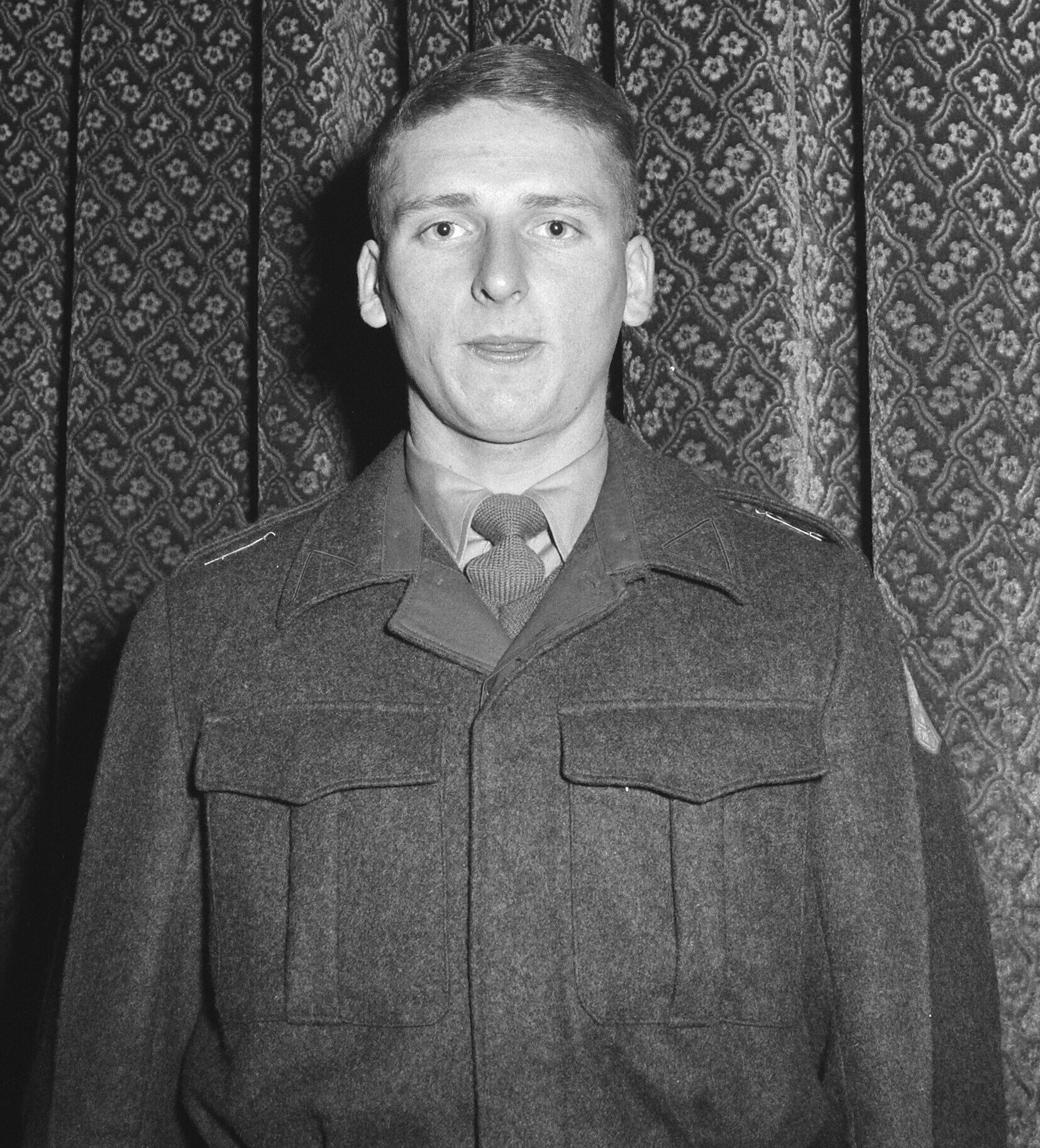
Herman Beidschat, the tournament's best pitcher

- Best pitcher: (Netherlands) Herman Beidschat
- Best hitter: (Italy) Angelo Novali
- Best catcher: (Spain) Braulio García
- Best umpire: (Netherlands) Piet van Deenen

Only three batters had a batting average of at least .300 in the tournament

Best batting average:

- (Italy) Angelo Novali: .455
- (West Germany) Adolf Weindl: .333
- (Spain) Francisco Amescua: .308
