= 1965 European Baseball Championship =

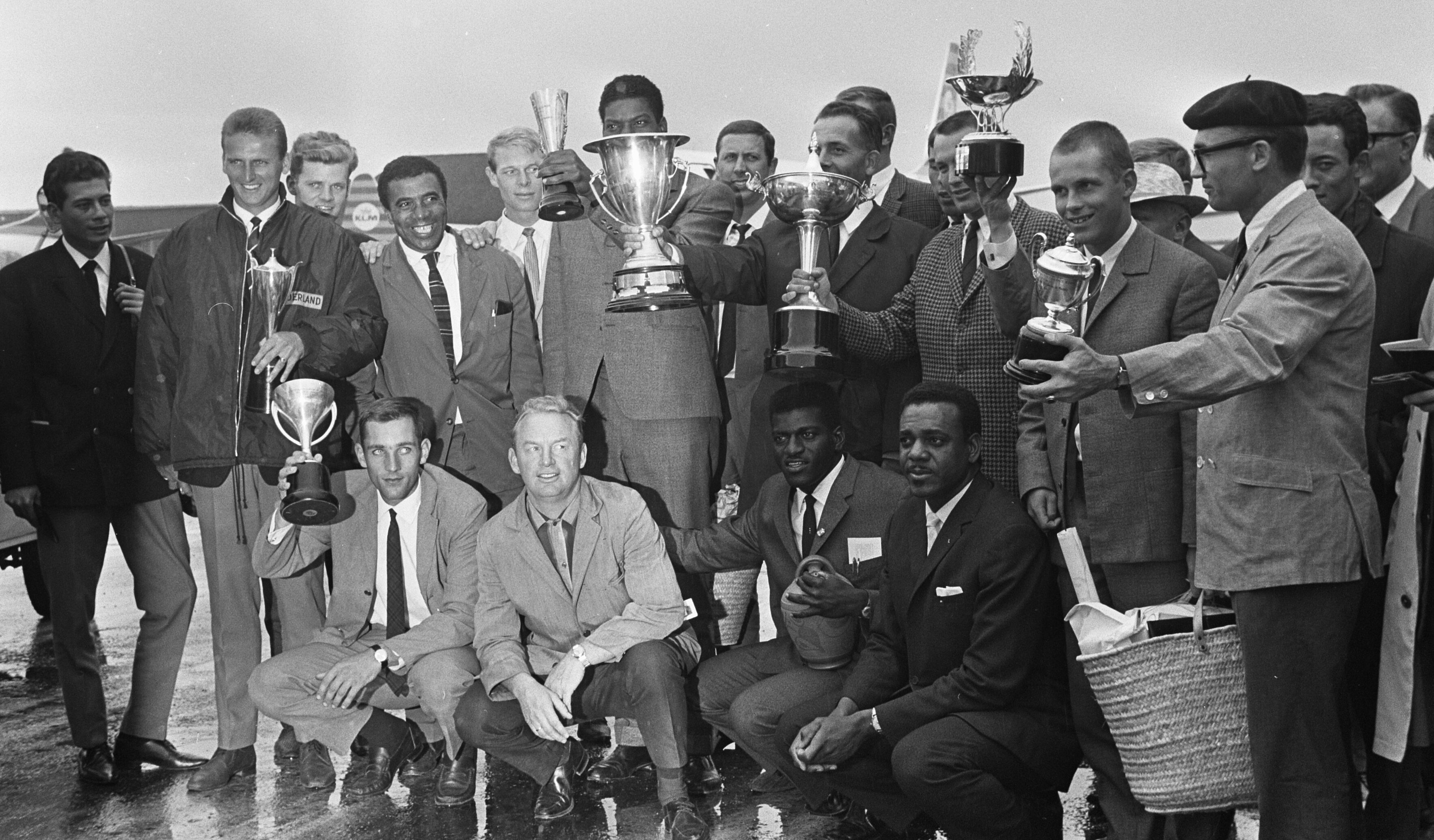
- The Netherlands players holding their trophies after winning the tournament

Tournament details
- Country: Spain
- City: Madrid
- Dates: 29 August–5 September
- Teams: 5
- Defending champions: Netherlands

Final positions
- Champions: Netherlands (7th title)
- Runners-up: Italy
- Third place: West Germany
- Fourth place: Spain

Tournament statistics
- Games played: 10
- Most HRs: (Italy) Augusto Savignano (3)

Awards
- MVP: (Netherlands) Hamilton Richardson

The 1965 European Baseball Championship was held in Madrid, Spain at La Elipa Stadium. The Netherlands won their seventh consecutive European title. The Dutch run differential was 57–0 in the tournament and their all-time record in the tournament was 27–0. The Netherlands defeated second-place Italy 16–0. West Germany finished the third place after defeating Spain for the first time. The largest blowout was Italy's 30–1 win over winless Sweden.

Offensively, the Netherlands was led by three players from the Netherlands Antilles who played for Honkbal Hoofdklase club Sparta: Hamilton Richardson, who was named the most valuable player, Hudson John, and Simon Arrindell, who hit a home run against Italy that reportedly traveled 150 m (490 ft). Richardson batted .538 and John batted .500 in the tournament, though organizers said neither had enough at bats to qualify for the batting title.

== Standings ==
Pos.	Team	Record	RS	RA
1	Netherlands	4–0	57	0
2	Italy	3–1	53	26
3	West Germany	2–2	18	21
4	Spain	2–2	28	43
5	Sweden	0–4	7	73

== Awards ==
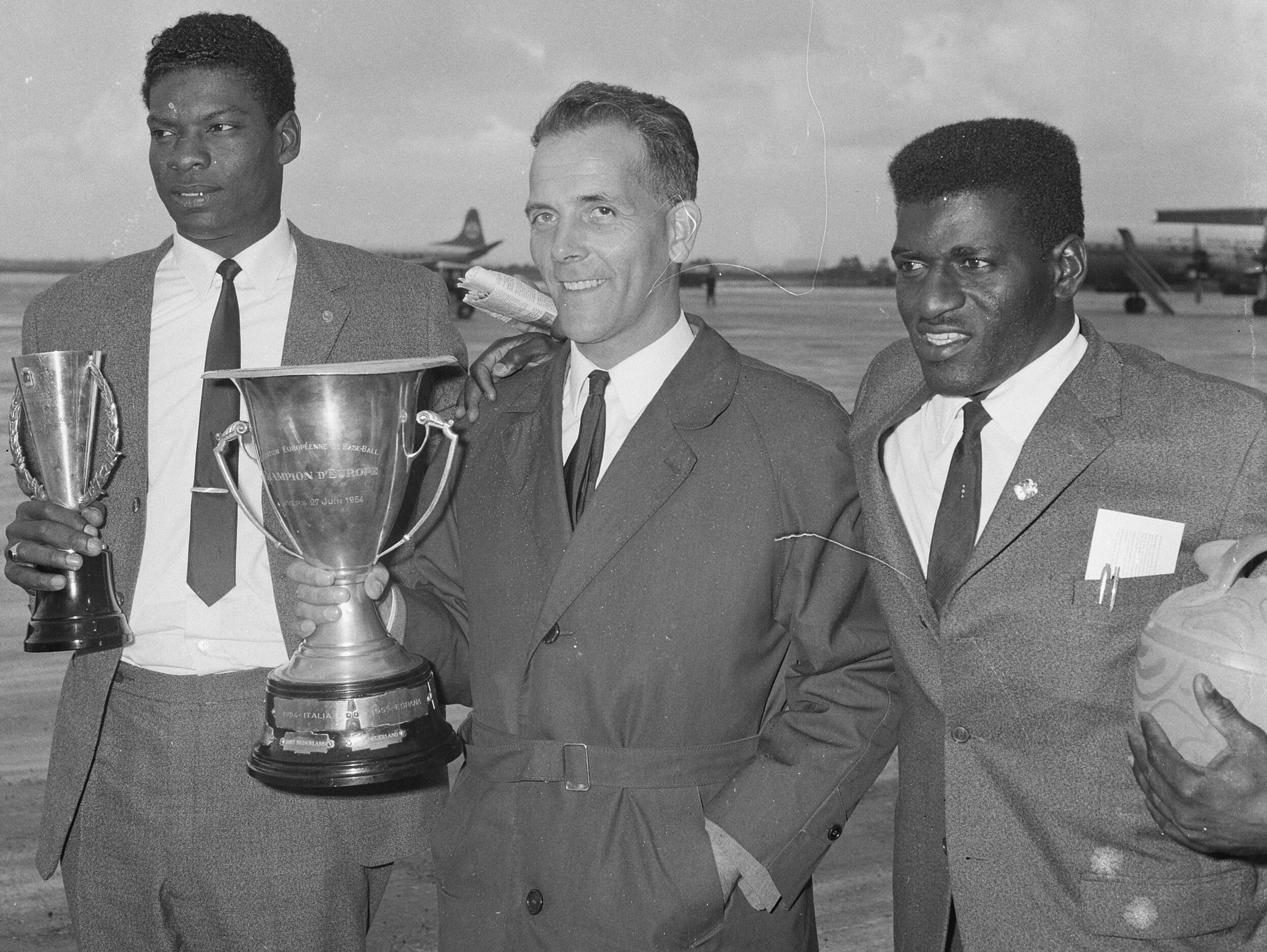
Most valuable player Hamilton Richardson (left) and Dutch teammates Han Urbanus and Hudson John (center and right)

- Most valuable player: (Netherlands) Hamilton Richardson
- Best pitcher: (Netherlands) Herman Beidschat
- Best batting average: (Italy) Alfredo Lauri, .438
- Best catcher: (Netherlands) Wim Crouwel
- Best first baseman: (Netherlands) Boudewijn Maat
- Best manager: (Netherlands) Glenn Gostick
- Most sporting team: Sweden
- Most home runs: (Italy) Augusto Savignano, 3
