= Royal Spanish Baseball and Softball Federation =

Spanish national sports governing body

- Sport: Baseball
- Jurisdiction: Spain
- Abbreviation: RFEBS
- Founded: 1944
- Affiliation: WBSC
- Regional affiliation: WBSC Europe
- Headquarters: Madrid, Spain
- President: Pablo Carpio Navarro

Official website
- www.rfebs.es
- (Spain)

The Royal Spanish Baseball and Softball Federation (Spanish: Real Federación Española de Béisbol y Sófbol) is the national governing body of baseball and softball in Spain. The association was established in 1944 and it is headquartered in Madrid.

The Royal Spanish Baseball and Softball Federation is responsible for the men's national baseball team, women's national baseball team, the men's national softball team, the women's national softball team and overseeing the División de Honor de Béisbol, Spain's top baseball competition.

== History ==
The Royal Spanish Baseball and Softball Federation was established on 23 March 1944 as the Federación Española de Pelota Base (Spanish Base Ball Federation) and Francisco Amescua García-López was appointed as the federation's first president.

In April 1953, Spain was one of the founding members of the Confederation of European Baseball (now WBSC Europe), alongside France, Italy, Belgium and West Germany. Delegates from each one of the countries met in Paris and established the Fédération Européenne de Baseball (European Baseball Federation).

As of 2023, the RFEBS has 6127 members (1318 of them women).

== Teams ==
The Royal Spanish Baseball and Softball Federation oversees the development of the following national baseball and softball teams:

Baseball

- Spain national baseball team
- Spain women's national baseball team

Softball

- Spain men's national softball team
- Spain women's national softball team

Other sports

- Spain national Baseball5 team
