= Sweden national baseball team =

Information
- Country: Sweden
- Federation: Swedish Baseball and Softball Federation (SBSF)
- Confederation: WBSC Europe
- Manager: (Sweden) Björn Johanessen
- Captain: Peter Johannessen
- Team Colors: Blue, Yellow, Black

WBSC ranking
- Current: 34 ▲1 (26 March 2026)
- Highest: 29 (2 times; latest in 02 November 2023)
- Lowest: 73 (11 August 2021)

Olympic Games
- Appearances: 0

World Baseball Classic
- Appearances: 0

WBSC Premier12
- Appearances: 0

World Cup
- Appearances: 3 (first in 1994)
- Best result: 15th

Intercontinental Cup
- Appearances: 0

European Championship
- Appearances: 29 (first in 1962)
- Best result: (bronze) 3rd (2 times, most recent in 1993)

Women's World Cup
- Appearances: 0

The Sweden national baseball team (Swedish: Sveriges herrlandslag i baseboll) also referred to as "Sverige Vikings" is the national baseball team of Sweden. The team competes in the bi-annual European Baseball Championship, where it has on two occasions won the bronze medal.

== History ==
Baseball has been played in Sweden since at least 1904. It wasn't until 1952 that the first game was played by a national team. In that year Sweden lost to Finland, 9–4.

The Sweden national team in 1969.

Ten years later, Sweden's national federation became members of the Confederation of European Baseball, and the national team took part in its first European Baseball Championship, where Sweden lost all four games by a combined score of 55–16. In the next tournament two years later, Sweden won its first ever game in the European championship, 5–0 over France.

Sweden played its first official game on home soil in 1974, a 9–1 win over Great Britain in the qualifications for the 1975 European championship.

In 1981, Sweden won bronze at the European championships in the Netherlands, with only four teams competed. This achievement was matched in 1993, when Sweden hosted the tournament for the first time.

Sweden played in the Baseball World Cup for the first time in 1994, later participating in 2005 and 2009, but always finished near the bottom. In 2009, Sweden was one of eight host countries.

== Technical staff ==
One of the earliest managers of the national team was Bill Arce, an American coach who took the helm when Sweden made its debut at the European championship in Amsterdam. He was followed by Willy Wåhlin, a Swedish baseball pioneer and founder of the Solna Baseball Club, who is credited with establishing baseball's foothold in the Stockholm area. During his tenure, Sweden achieved its first-ever European championship victory, a 5–0 win over France in Milan.

After a gap in documented records, Roland Bergh guided the Sverige Vikings to a bronze medal at the European Championship, one of the proudest moments in the team's history. Over the years, foreign managers from the United States have also led the team, bringing international expertise to help develop the sport locally. John Tourville guided Sweden in their early World Cup appearances, while Jerry Kindall helped elevate the program's tactical foundations during his tenure.

Peter Schöön and Karl Knutsson continued the domestic tradition, maintaining Sweden's unbroken record of participation in every European championship since 1962, something no other nation has achieved. Dennis Cook led the team through one of its longest foreign-managed stretches, helping modernize the program. Jonas Holmberg and Rickard Reimer followed, with Jim Sasko notably serving two separate tenures, cementing his legacy as one of the most trusted figures in the federation's history. Reimer also returned for a second term, providing continuity through a challenging period that included the global pandemic.

The current manager, Björn Johannessen, now leads the Vikings as they compete in the European Baseball Championship. Under both domestic and foreign leadership, Sweden's national baseball team has twice achieved bronze medal finishes in Europe and competed in the Baseball World Cup three times.

- (United States) Bill Arce (1962)
- (Sweden) Willy Wåhlin (1963–1964)
- (Sweden) Roland Bergh (1993)
- (United States) John Tourville (1994–1995)
- (Sweden) Jim Sasko (1997–1999)
- (United States) Jerry Kindall (2000–2002)
- (Sweden) Peter Schöön (2003–2005)
- (Sweden) Karl Knutsson (2007–2009)
- (United States) Dennis Cook (2010–2014)
- (Sweden) Jonas Holmberg (2015–2016)
- (Sweden) Rickard Reimer (2016–2018)
- (Sweden) Jim Sasko (2019–2020)
- (Sweden) Rickard Reimer (2021–2024)
- (Sweden) Björn Johannessen (2025–present)

== International tournament results ==
=== Olympic games ===
Summer Olympics record								Qualification
Year	Host	Round	Position	W	L	RS	RA	Qualification
1912	Sweden	Exhibition only		0	1	3	13	

Sweden played host to the first ever international exhibition baseball match to be held at the Olympic Games. The players of the Västerås Baseball Club represented their home nation in the game against a team composed of members of the United States Olympic delegation. In addition, three pitchers and a catcher were recruited from the American delegation to help fill the Swedish roster.

Sweden has not succeeded in qualifying during any of the years the sport has been officially included in the Olympics, nor has it participated in any further baseball exhibitions at the Olympics since 1912.

=== World Cup ===
Sweden participated in the World Cup on three occasions.

- 1994: 15th (of 16)
- 2005: 16th (of 18)
- 2009: 19th (of 22)

=== European Baseball Championship ===
Sweden has participated in the European Baseball Championship on 29 occasions, every time since 1962.

- 1962: 7th (of 7)
- 1964: 4th (of 5)
- 1965: 5th (of 5)
- 1967: 5th (of 5)
- 1969: 6th (of 7)
- 1971: 8th (of 9)
- 1973: 5th (of 6)
- 1975: 5th (of 6)

- 1977: 4th (of 5)
- 1979: 4th (of 4)
- 1981: 3rd (of 4) (bronze)
- 1983: 5th (of 6)
- 1985: 4th (of 6)
- 1987: 5th (of 7)
- 1989: 4th (of 8)
- 1991: 7th (of 8)

- 1993: 3rd (of 8) (bronze)
- 1995: 7th (of 10)
- 1997: 8th (of 12)
- 1999: 7th (of 12)
- 2001: 12th (of 12)
- 2003: 4th (of 12)
- 2005: 8th (of 12)
- 2007: 6th (of 12)

- 2010: 5th (of 12)
- 2012: 6th (of 12)
- 2014: 11th (of 12)
- 2016: 8th (of 12)
- 2019: 12th (of 12)
- 2021: 12th (of 16)
- 2023: 8th (of 16)
- 2025: 10th (of 16)
