= 1956 European Baseball Championship =

Tournament details
- Country: Italy
- City: Rome
- Dates: 10–15 July
- Teams: 5
- Defending champions: Spain

Final positions
- Champions: Netherlands (1st title)
- Runners-up: Belgium
- Third place: Italy

Tournament statistics
- Games played: 10

The 1956 European Baseball Championship was held in Rome, Italy and was won by the Netherlands, in its tournament debut. Belgium finished as runner-up. The games were played at the Motovelodromo Appio, the former home stadium of AS Roma.

By winning tournament, the Netherlands qualified for the 1956 Global World Series, held in Milwaukee in the United States.

== Tournament summary ==
The Netherlands, in its first championship, won all its games, though most were close contests. The only blowout was its victory against Italy, previously the continent's baseball powerhouse. Dutch ace Han Urbanus squared off against Italy's Giulio Glorioso; Urbanus would later call the 1956 Netherlands–Italy game one of the best moments of his career. Urbanus and Jan Smidt each won two games for the Dutch, with Smidt striking out 13 batters against West Germany and 16 against Belgium. Smidt was named the pitcher of the tournament, though the Dutch manager had scheduled Smidt to face weaker opponents.

France, which debuted in the 1955 tournament, did not participate, reportedly since many of its players were drafted to fight in the ongoing Algerian War.

Pope Pius XII visited tournament participants on July 15, though Dutch and West German players missed the audience since they were playing a tournament game.

== Results ==
Pos	Team	Pld	W	L	RF	RA	RD	PCT	GB	NED	BEL	ITA	ESP	FRG
1	Netherlands	4	4	0	23	8	+15	1.000	—		1–0	13–2	6–4	3–2
2	Belgium	4	3	1	27	8	+19	.750	1	0–1		3–2	14–3	10–2
3	Italy (H)	4	2	2	17	24	−7	.500	2	2–13	2–3		7–5	7–3
4	Spain	4	1	3	17	30	−13	.250	3	4–6	3–14	5–7		5–4
5	West Germany	4	0	4	11	25	−14	.000	4	2–3	2–10	3–7	4–5	

(H) Hosts
