= Belgium national baseball team =

Information
- Country: Belgium
- Federation: Royal Belgian Baseball and Softball Federation
- Confederation: WBSC Europe
- Manager: Marc Janssen

WBSC ranking
- Current: 38 (26 March 2026)

The Belgium national baseball team also known as the Red Hawks, is the national baseball team of Belgium. The team competes in the bi-annual European Baseball Championship.

== Tournament results ==
Baseball World Cup

- 1978 : 11th
- 1986 : 12th

European Baseball Championship

Team Belgium competed in the 2019 European Baseball Championship, coming in tied for 7th out of 12 teams.

- 1954 : (bronze)
- 1955 : (silver)
- 1956 : (silver)
- 1957 : 5th
- 1958 : 4th
- 1962 : 4th
- 1967 : (gold)
- 1969 : 5th

- 1971 : 4th
- 1973 : 4th
- 1977 : (bronze)
- 1979 : (bronze)
- 1981 : 4th
- 1983 : (bronze)
- 1985 : (bronze)
- 1987 : 4th

- 1989 : 6th
- 1991 : 5th
- 1993 : 6th
- 1995 : (bronze)
- 1997 : 6th
- 1999 : 6th
- 2001 : 9th
- 2003 : 11th
- 2019 : 7th
- 2021 : 8th
- 2023 : 11th
- 2025 : 13th

European Junior Baseball Championship

- 2007 : 9th
- 2009 : 10th

European Under-21 Baseball Championship

- 2008 : 8th
