= U-12 Baseball European Championship =

International youth baseball tournament

- Current season, competition or edition: 2026
- Sport: Baseball
- Founded: 1992
- No. of teams: 8 (Finals)
- Continent: Europe
- Most recent champion: Germany (5th title)
- Most titles: Czech Republic; Italy (10 titles)

The U-12 Baseball European Championship is an annual international baseball tournament for players under 12 years old, organized by WBSC Europe. In even-numbered years, the top two teams qualify for the following year's U-12 Baseball World Cup. A qualifying round (Pool B) is held concurrently, with the top teams from this round exchanging with lower-ranked teams from the main tournament to qualify for the main tournament the following year.

== Results ==
Ed.	Year	Host	Final			Semifinalists		
Ed.	Year	Host	Winner	Score	Runner-up	Third Place	Score	Fourth Place
1	1992; Details	(Czechoslovakia); Prague	Italy	16–6	Netherlands	Belgium		Czechoslovakia
2	1993; Details	(Italy); Livorno	Italy	6–0	Netherlands	Estonia		Czechoslovakia
3	1994; Details	(France); Paris	Italy	3–0	Moldova	Czech Republic		France
4	1995; Details	(Czech Republic); Prague	Italy	10–0	Romania	Czech Republic		Russia
5	1996; Details	(Poland); Kutno	Netherlands	7–1	Italy	Poland		Romania
6	1997; Details	(Italy); Parma	Italy	13–3	Russia	Netherlands		Romania
7	1998; Details	(Switzerland); Lausanne	Italy	23–8	Czech Republic	Poland		Russia
8	1999; Details	(Netherlands); Velsen	Russia	5–3; 11–4	Czech Republic	Netherlands		Poland
9	2000; Details	(Czech Republic); Choceň	Netherlands	-	Italy	Czech Republic		Russia
10	2001; Details	(Poland); Kutno	Netherlands	9–5	Russia	Italy		Czech Republic
11	2002; Details	(Czech Republic); Prague	Russia	2–0	Czech Republic	Netherlands		Poland
12	2003; Details	(Russia); Moscow	Czech Republic	-	Russia	Ukraine		Poland
13	2004; Details	(Slovakia); Trnava	Czech Republic	-	Russia	Poland		Lithuania
14	2005; Details	(Moldova); Vadul lui Vodă	Russia	8–4	Czech Republic	Poland		Ukraine
15	2006; Details	(Czech Republic); Hluboká nad Vltavou	Czech Republic	8–3	Russia	Israel		Poland
16	2007; Details	(Czech Republic); Šumperk	Czech Republic	7–2	Poland	Russia		Lithuania
17	2008; Details	(Czech Republic); Hluboká nad Vltavou	Czech Republic	10–5	Ukraine	Poland		Russia
18	2009; Details	(Bulgaria); Dupnitsa	Czech Republic	13–6	Russia	Bulgaria		Austria
19	2010; Details	(Czech Republic); Hluboká nad Vltavou	Russia	6–4	Czech Republic	Lithuania		Austria
20	2011; Details	(Belarus); Brest	Russia	14–11	Czech Republic	Ukraine		Lithuania
21	2012; Details	(Czech Republic); Hluboká nad Vltavou	Czech Republic	19–1	Russia	Lithuania		Israel
22	2013; Details	(Czech Republic); Choceň	Czech Republic	-	Lithuania	Austria		Russia
23	2014; Details	(Slovenia); Ljubljana	Russia	14–4	France	Czech Republic		Lithuania
24	2015; Details	(Poland); Miejska Górka	Czech Republic	5–4	Russia	France		Poland
25	2016; Details	(Czech Republic); Třebíč	Germany	9–2	Czech Republic	Russia		Austria
26	2017; Details	(Netherlands); Utrecht	Italy	12–1	France	Czech Republic		Germany
27	2018; Details	(Hungary); Budapest	Italy	11–0	Czech Republic	Russia		Netherlands
28	2019; Details	(Czech Republic); Třebíč	Italy	7–5	Netherlands	Germany		Czech Republic
29	2021; Details	(Belgium); Mortsel	Italy	6–0	Czech Republic	Germany	28–14	Netherlands
30	2022; Details	(Austria); Vienna	Germany	10–9	Czech Republic	Netherlands	12–5	Italy
31	2023; Details	(France); Valenciennes	Germany	3–2	Netherlands	Italy	11–7	Czech Republic
32	2024; Details	(Germany); Paderborn	Germany	5–0	Netherlands	Czech Republic	11–0	Italy
33	2025; Details	(Czech Republic); Hluboká nad Vltavou	Czech Republic	18–1	Italy	Netherlands	7–6	Germany
34	2026; Details	(France); Évry-Courcouronnes	Germany	6–4	Czech Republic	Italy Netherlands		
35	2027; Details	(Spain); Pamplona						

== Medals (1992–2026) ==
Rank	Nation	Gold	Silver	Bronze	Total
1	Czech Republic	10	11	6	27
2	Italy	10	3	3	16
3	Russia	6	8	3	17
4	Germany	5	0	2	7
5	Netherlands	3	5	6	14
6	France	0	2	1	3
7	Poland	0	1	5	6
8	Lithuania	0	1	2	3
8	Ukraine	0	1	2	3
10	Moldova	0	1	0	1
10	Romania	0	1	0	1
12	Austria	0	0	1	1
12	Belgium	0	0	1	1
12	Bulgaria	0	0	1	1
12	Estonia	0	0	1	1
12	Israel	0	0	1	1
Totals (16 entries)		34	34	35	103

- 2 Bronze awarded in 2026 (ITA, NED).

== Participating nations ==
Host country

Nation	1992 (7)	1993 (11)	1994 (5)	1995 (7)	1996 (7)	1997 (8)	1998 (12)	1999 (6)	2000 (5)	2001 (12)	2002 (8)	2003 (9)	2004 (7)	2005 (8)	2006 (7)	2007 (7)	2008 (6)	2009 (9)	2010 (7)	2011 (8)
Armenia							12th													
Austria															5th	5th	6th	4th	4th	7th
Belarus												9th		8th	6th				6th	5th
Belgium	3rd																			
Bulgaria										9th						6th		3rd		
Croatia																				
Czech Republic	4th	4th	3rd	3rd	6th	5th	2nd	2nd	3rd	4th	2nd	1st	1st	2nd	1st	1st	1st	1st	2nd	2nd
Estonia		3rd																		
Finland	7th																			
France	6th	7th	4th																	
Georgia										8th										
Germany							9th	5th												
Great Britain											5th	8th								
Hungary																				
Ireland						8th														
Israel				6th			8th	6th		11th	8th	6th	7th	6th	3rd	7th				
Italy	1st	1st	1st	1st	2nd	1st	1st		2nd	3rd										
Lithuania	5th									10th	7th	5th	4th	7th		4th	5th	5th	3rd	4th
Moldova			2nd											5th						
Netherlands	2nd	2nd			1st	3rd	6th	3rd	1st	1st	3rd									
Poland		8th			3rd	7th	3rd	4th	5th	5th	4th	4th	3rd	3rd	4th	2nd	3rd			6th
Romania		11th		2nd	4th	4th	5th			6th								8th	7th	8th
Russia		5th	5th	4th	7th	2nd	4th	1st	4th	2nd	1st	2nd	2nd	1st	2nd	3rd	4th	2nd	1st	1st
San Marino		6th																		
Slovakia		10th								7th	6th	7th	6th		7th			6th	5th	
Slovenia		9th		7th			7th			12th										
Spain																				
Switzerland							10th													
Turkey																		9th		
Ukraine				5th	5th	6th	11th					3rd	5th	4th			2nd	7th		3rd

Nation	2012 (8)	2013 (6)	2014 (7)	2015 (9)	2016 (11)	2017 (9)	2018 (14)	2019 (8)	2021 (10)	2022 (8)	2023 (8)	2024 (8)	2025 (8)	2026 (8)	Total
Armenia															1
Austria	5th	3rd	7th	8th	4th	9th	12th		7th	6th	6th	6th	8th		18
Belarus	6th	6th	6th	5th	6th										10
Belgium							8th	7th	8th				6th	5th	6
Bulgaria															3
Croatia							14th								1
Czech Republic	1st	1st	3rd	1st	2nd	3rd	2nd	4th	2nd	2nd	4th	3rd	1st	2nd	34
Estonia															1
Finland															1
France			2nd	3rd	5th	2nd	5th	5th	6th	5th	5th	5th	5th	7th	15
Georgia															1
Germany					1st	4th	6th	3rd	3rd	1st	1st	1st	4th	1st	12
Great Britain							11th				8th			8th	4
Hungary							7th	8th	5th	8th					4
Ireland															1
Israel	4th														11
Italy						1st	1st	1st	1st	4th	3rd	4th	2nd	3rd	18
Lithuania	3rd	2nd	4th	6th	9th				9th	7th	7th	8th			20
Moldova															2
Netherlands						5th	4th	2nd	4th	3rd	2nd	2nd	3rd	3rd	18
Poland				4th	10th	8th	13th		10th						20
Romania	8th			7th	7th										12
Russia	2nd	4th	1st	2nd	3rd	6th	3rd	6th							27
San Marino															1
Slovakia					8th		10th								10
Slovenia	7th	5th	5th	9th											8
Spain														6th	1
Switzerland															1
Turkey															1
Ukraine					11th	7th	9th					7th	7th		15

== See also ==
- U-12 Baseball World Cup
- U-23 Baseball European Championship
- U-18 Baseball European Championship
- U-15 Baseball European Championship
