= U-15 Baseball European Championship =

International youth baseball tournament

- Current season, competition or edition: 2025
- Sport: Baseball
- Founded: 1975
- No. of teams: 8 (Finals)
- Continent: Europe
- Most recent champion: Germany (4th title)
- Most titles: Netherlands (13 titles)

The U-15 Baseball European Championship is a biennial international baseball tournament for players under 15 years old, sanctioned by WBSC Europe. It is held in odd-numbered years, with the top two teams qualifying for the following year's U-15 Baseball World Cup. In even-numbered years, a qualifying round (Pool B) is held.

== Results ==
Ed.	Year	Host	Final			Semifinalists		
Ed.	Year	Host	Winner	Score	Runner-up	Third Place	Score	Fourth Place
1	1975	(West Germany); Mannheim	Netherlands	-	Belgium	West Germany		
2	1977	(Belgium); Brasschaat	Italy	-	Netherlands	Belgium		
3	1979	(Spain); Madrid	Italy	-	Netherlands	Spain		West Germany
4	1981	(Belgium); Antwerp	Netherlands	8 – 6	Spain	Italy		West Germany
5	1983	(Belgium); Antwerp	Italy	11 – 10	Netherlands	West Germany		Belgium
6	1985	(Belgium)	Netherlands	-	Italy	Sweden		Belgium
7	1992	(France); Agen, Toulouse	Italy	30 – 2	Spain	Lithuania		Romania
8	1993	(Italy); Trieste	Italy	-	Moldova	Czech Republic		France
9	1994	(Italy); Florence	Italy	6 – 5	Moldova	Poland		Ukraine
10	1995	(Italy); Livorno	Italy	23 – 10	Czech Republic	Russia		Poland
11	1996	(France); Sarcelles	Italy	12 – 11	Russia	Ukraine		France
12	1997	(Czech Republic); Choceň	Italy	11 – 1	Czech Republic	Ukraine		Poland
13	1999	(Czech Republic); Ostrava	Netherlands	6 – 5	Czech Republic	Romania		Russia
14	2000	(Spain); Pamplona	Netherlands	12 – 0	Russia	Spain		Czech Republic
15	2002	(Netherlands) 's-Hertogenbosch	Netherlands	5 – 2	Czech Republic	Spain		Russia
16	2004	(Czech Republic); Blansko	Czech Republic	6 – 4	Spain	Russia		Netherlands
17	2006	(Spain); Gijón	Netherlands	16 – 2	France	Czech Republic		Spain
18	2007	(Czech Republic); Jablonec	Czech Republic	7 – 3	Netherlands	Russia	13 – 8	Austria
19	2008	(Italy); Rome	Netherlands	7 – 6	Russia	Czech Republic	4 – 2	Italy
20	2009	(Czech Republic); Brno	Italy	9 – 2	Russia	Czech Republic	11 – 8	Netherlands
21	2010	(Netherlands); Eindhoven	Netherlands	14 – 4	Czech Republic	Italy	8 – 1	Bulgaria
22	2011	(Czech Republic); Brno	Italy	9 – 8	Czech Republic	Germany		Netherlands
23	2012	(Czech Republic); Jablonec	Netherlands	10 – 5	Germany	Russia	7 – 2	Czech Republic
24	2013	(Sweden); Nyköping	Netherlands	10 – 2	Czech Republic	Germany	13 – 3	Russia
25	2014	(Germany); Paderborn	Netherlands	11 – 10	Czech Republic	Germany	12 – 2	Lithuania
26	2015	(Czech Republic); Brno	Germany	6 – 5	Czech Republic	Ukraine	3 – 2	Austria
27	2016	(France); Chartres	Czech Republic	10 – 9	France	Germany	10 – 3	Russia
28	2017	(Austria); Wiener Neustadt	Germany	4 – 2	Netherlands	Czech Republic	11 – 8	France
29	2019	(Italy); Nettuno	Germany	10 – 3	Italy	Netherlands	3 – 0	Czech Republic
30	2021; Details	(Czech Republic) / (Slovakia); Brno / Trnava	Czech Republic	4 – 4	France	Netherlands	5 – 3	Italy
31	2023; Details	(Slovakia); Trnava	Netherlands	14 – 4	Italy	Czech Republic	20 – 6	France
32	2025; Details	(Italy); Trieste	Germany	12 – 2	Czech Republic	Netherlands	11 – 10	Italy
33	2027; Details	(France); Metz						

== Medals (1975–2025) ==
Rank	Nation	Gold	Silver	Bronze	Total
1	Netherlands	13	5	3	21
2	Italy	11	3	2	16
3	Czech Republic	4	10	6	20
4	Germany	4	1	6	11
5	Russia	0	4	4	8
6	Spain	0	3	3	6
7	France	0	3	0	3
8	Moldova	0	2	0	2
9	Belgium	0	1	1	2
10	Ukraine	0	0	3	3
11	Lithuania	0	0	1	1
11	Poland	0	0	1	1
11	Romania	0	0	1	1
11	Sweden	0	0	1	1
Totals (14 entries)		32	32	32	96

== Participating nations ==
Host country

Nation	1975 (3)	1977 (3)	1979 (6)	1981 (6)	1983 (4)	1985 (5)	1992 (8)	1993 (8)	1994 (9)	1995 (8)	1996 (7)	1997 (10)	1999 (10)	2000 (7)	2002 (14)	2004 (11)	2006 (8)	2007 (8)	2008 (8)	2009 (8)
Austria												7th	6th		9th	8th	6th	4th	6th	6th
Belarus															14th			7th		
Belgium	2nd	3rd		5th	4th	4th	8th													
Bulgaria																				
Croatia									8th	8th					11th	9th				
Czech Republic							7th	3rd	5th	2nd	5th	2nd	2nd	4th	2nd	1st	3rd	1st	3rd	3rd
France			5th	6th			5th	4th	6th		4th	5th	8th		5th	6th	2nd			
Germany	3rd		4th	4th	3rd													5th	5th	5th
Great Britain								7th							8th	10th				
Hungary									9th			10th								
Israel										7th	6th	6th								
Italy		1st	1st	3rd	1st	2nd	1st	1st	1st	1st	1st	1st		5th					4th	1st
Lithuania							3rd												8th	
Moldova								2nd	2nd											
Netherlands	1st	2nd	2nd	1st	2nd	1st							1st	1st	1st	4th	1st	2nd	1st	4th
Poland							6th	5th	3rd	4th	7th	4th	5th	6th	6th	7th	7th	8th		
Romania							4th			6th			3rd	7th						
Russia								6th	7th	3rd	2nd		4th	2nd	4th	3rd	5th	3rd	2nd	2nd
San Marino						5th														
Serbia			6th																	
Slovenia								8th							13th					
Slovakia												9th			7th	5th	8th	6th	7th	7th
Spain			3rd	2nd			2nd							3rd	3rd	2nd	4th			
Sweden						3rd							9th		10th	11th				
Switzerland												8th	10th		12th					
Ukraine									4th	5th	3rd	3rd	7th							8th

Nation	2010 (8)	2011 (8)	2012 (8)	2013 (8)	2014 (8)	2015 (8)	2016 (7)	2017 (10)	2019 (8)	2021 (7)	2023 (7)	2025 (8)	Total
Austria	8th	7th	8th			4th	5th	6th	6th	7th			16
Belarus					6th	7th							4
Belgium	6th											7th	8
Bulgaria	4th	8th											2
Croatia													4
Czech Republic	2nd	2nd	4th	2nd	2nd	2nd	1st	3rd	4th	1st	3rd	2nd	26
France							2nd	4th	7th	2nd	4th	6th	17
Germany	5th	3rd	2nd	3rd	3rd	1st	3rd	1st	1st	5th	5th	1st	19
Great Britain												5th	4
Hungary											6th	8th	4
Israel													3
Italy	3rd	1st						5th	2nd	4th	2nd	4th	21
Lithuania				5th	4th	5th	6th	10th					7
Moldova													2
Netherlands	1st	4th	1st	1st	1st			2nd	3rd	3rd	1st	3rd	24
Poland						8th		9th					14
Romania													4
Russia	7th	5th	3rd	4th	7th	6th	4th	8th	5th				21
San Marino													1
Serbia													1
Slovenia							7th						3
Slovakia			6th	8th					8th	6th	7th		12
Spain								7th					8
Sweden		6th	7th	7th	5th								8
Switzerland													3
Ukraine			5th	6th	8th	3rd							10

== See also ==
- U-15 Baseball World Cup
- U-23 Baseball European Championship
- U-18 Baseball European Championship
- U-12 Baseball European Championship
