= 2007 European Baseball Championship – Qualification =

Qualification for 2007 European Baseball Championship
Tournament details
- Countries: Russia; Belgium
- Dates: 25 – 29 July 2006; 1 – 5 August 2006
- Teams: 16

The qualification for the 2007 European Baseball Championship was held from July 25–29, 2006 in Russia and August 1–5, 2006 in Belgium. 16 nations contested to qualify for 2 spots available among the 10 other sides already qualified. In the end, 3 teams qualified for the 2007 competition, because of the removal of Greece. Austria replaced Greece, being the runners-up in the qualifier pool in Russia, while Croatia and Russia won their qualifier pools and were qualified to compete in the 2007 competition, to be placed with the 9 already qualified teams from the 2005 competition. These were Czech Republic, France, Germany, Italy, Netherlands, Spain, Sweden, Ukraine and United Kingdom.

== Qualifier Pool 1 ==
=== Group stage ===
==== Group A ====
Qualified for the semi-finals
Did not qualify for the semi-finals

#	Team	Games	Wins	Losses	Tiebreaker
1	Russia	3	3	0	–
2	Austria	3	2	1	–
3	Poland	3	1	2	–
4	Georgia	3	0	3	–

July 25, 2006	Poland	4 – 7	Austria	Planernaya, Russia

July 25, 2006	Georgia	1 – 12	Russia	Planernaya, Russia

July 26, 2006	Austria	14 – 2	Georgia	Planernaya, Russia

July 26, 2006	Russia	11 – 1	Poland	Planernaya, Russia

July 27, 2006	Georgia	5 – 19	Poland	Planernaya, Russia

July 27, 2006	Austria	1 – 12	Russia	Planernaya, Russia

==== Group B ====
Qualified for the semi-finals
Did not qualify for the semi-finals

#	Team	Games	Wins	Losses	Tiebreaker
1	Belarus	3	3	0	–
2	Lithuania	3	2	1	–
3	Finland	3	1	2	–
4	Turkey	3	0	3	–

July 25, 2006	Lithuania	6 – 10	Belarus	Balashikha, Russia

July 25, 2006	Turkey	16 – 23	Finland	Balashikha, Russia

July 26, 2006	Finland	2 – 15	Lithuania	Balashikha, Russia

July 26, 2006	Belarus	11 – 1	Turkey	Balashikha, Russia

July 27, 2006	Lithuania	8 – 5	Turkey	Balashikha, Russia

July 27, 2006	Finland	3 – 13	Belarus	Balashikha, Russia

=== Final round ===
==== Group C ====
#	Team	Games	Wins	Losses	Tiebreaker
1	Poland	3	3	0	–
2	Georgia	3	2	1	–
3	Finland	3	1	2	–
4	Turkey	3	0	3	–

July 28, 2006	Finland	5 – 10	Georgia	Balashikha, Russia

July 28, 2006	Poland	11 – 1	Turkey	Balashikha, Russia

July 29, 2006	Poland	16 – 6	Finland	Balashikha, Russia

July 29, 2006	Turkey	13 – 16	Georgia	Balashikha, Russia

==== Semi-finals ====
July 28, 2006	Belarus	5 – 15	Austria	Planernaya, Russia

July 28, 2006	Russia	11 – 1	Lithuania	Planernaya, Russia

==== 3rd place ====
July 29, 2006	Lithuania	10 – 8	Belarus	Planernaya, Russia

==== Final ====
July 29, 2006	Russia	17 – 0	Austria	Planernaya, Russia

== Qualifier Pool 2 ==
=== Group stage ===
==== Group A ====
Qualified for the semi-finals
Did not qualify for the semi-finals

#	Team	Games	Wins	Losses	Tiebreaker
1	Croatia	3	3	0	–
2	Ireland	3	2	1	–
3	Slovakia	3	1	2	–
4	Norway	3	0	3	–

August 1, 2006	Slovakia	2 – 6	Ireland	Antwerp, Belgium

August 1, 2006	Norway	5 – 20	Croatia	Hoboken, Belgium

August 2, 2006	Croatia	8 – 0	Slovakia	Hoboken, Belgium

August 2, 2006	Ireland	7 – 1	Norway	Hoboken, Belgium

August 3, 2006	Slovakia	13 – 2	Norway	Antwerp, Belgium

August 3, 2006	Croatia	2 – 1	Ireland	Antwerp, Belgium

==== Group B ====
Qualified for the semi-finals
Did not qualify for the semi-finals

#	Team	Games	Wins	Losses	Tiebreaker
1	Belgium	3	3	0	–
2	Switzerland	3	2	1	–
3	Slovenia	3	1	2	–
4	San Marino	3	0	3	–

August 1, 2006	San Marino	2 – 12	Slovenia	Hoboken, Belgium

August 1, 2006	Belgium	7 – 0	Switzerland	Hoboken, Belgium

August 2, 2006	Switzerland	10 – 0	San Marino	Antwerp, Belgium

August 2, 2006	Slovenia	1 – 7	Belgium	Antwerp, Belgium

August 3, 2006	Slovenia	4 – 8	Switzerland	Hoboken, Belgium

August 3, 2006	Belgium	11 – 1	San Marino	Hoboken, Belgium

=== Final round ===
==== Group C ====
#	Team	Games	Wins	Losses	Tiebreaker
1	Slovakia	3	3	0	–
2	Slovenia	3	2	1	–
3	San Marino	3	1	2	–
4	Norway	3	0	3	–

August 4, 2006	Slovenia	13 – 2	Norway	Antwerp, Belgium

August 4, 2006	Slovakia	7 – 2	San Marino	Hoboken, Belgium

August 5, 2006	Norway	3 – 13	San Marino	Antwerp, Belgium

August 5, 2006	Slovakia	13 – 3	Slovenia	Hoboken, Belgium

==== Semi-finals ====
August 4, 2006	Croatia	13 – 3	Switzerland	Antwerp, Belgium

August 4, 2006	Belgium	1 – 4	Ireland	Hoboken, Belgium

==== 3rd place ====
August 5, 2006	Switzerland	2 – 15	Belgium	Antwerp, Belgium

==== Final ====
August 5, 2006	Croatia	12 – 2	Ireland	Hoboken, Belgium
