= 2012 European Baseball Championship – Qualification =

Qualification for 2010 European Baseball Championship
Tournament details
- Countries: Belgium; Croatia; Israel; Russia; Spain
- Dates: 25 – 30 July 2011
- Teams: 22

The qualification for the 2012 European Baseball Championship was held from July 25–30, 2011 in Belgium, Croatia and Spain, from July 26–29, 2011 in Israel and from July 27–29, 2011 in Russia. 22 nations contested to qualify for 5 spots available among the 7 already qualified teams from the 2010 competition. These are, Czech Republic, France, Germany, Greece, Italy, the Netherlands and Sweden.

== Pool Antwerp ==
=== Standings ===
| Teams | W | L | Pct. | GB | R | RA |
|---|---|---|---|---|---|---|
| Belgium | 4 | 0 | 1.000 | — | 43 | 10 |
| Austria | 2 | 2 | .500 | 2 | 15 | 19 |
| Slovakia | 2 | 2 | .500 | 2 | 33 | 26 |
| Poland | 2 | 2 | .500 | 2 | 29 | 16 |
| Latvia | 0 | 4 | .000 | 4 | 8 | 57 |

=== Schedule ===
| July 25, 2011 | Poland | 5 – 10 | Slovakia | Antwerp, Belgium; Attendance: 95 |
| July 25, 2011 | | Boxscore | | Antwerp, Belgium; Attendance: 95 |

| July 25, 2011 | Belgium | 11 – 0 (F/7) | Austria | Antwerp, Belgium; Attendance: 115 |
| July 25, 2011 | | Boxscore | | Antwerp, Belgium; Attendance: 115 |

| July 26, 2011 | Latvia | 2 – 9 | Austria | Antwerp, Belgium; Attendance: 60 |
| July 26, 2011 | | Boxscore | | Antwerp, Belgium; Attendance: 60 |

| July 26, 2011 | Slovakia | 7 – 10 | Belgium | Antwerp, Belgium; Attendance: 145 |
| July 26, 2011 | | Boxscore | | Antwerp, Belgium; Attendance: 145 |

| July 27, 2011 | Poland | 15 – 0 (F/6) | Latvia | Antwerp, Belgium; Attendance: 45 |
| July 27, 2011 | | Boxscore | | Antwerp, Belgium; Attendance: 45 |

| July 27, 2011 | Austria | 5 – 0 | Slovakia | Antwerp, Belgium; Attendance: 45 |
| July 27, 2011 | | Boxscore | | Antwerp, Belgium; Attendance: 45 |

| July 28, 2011 | Austria | 1 – 6 | Poland | Antwerp, Belgium; Attendance: 40 |
| July 28, 2011 | | Boxscore | | Antwerp, Belgium; Attendance: 40 |

| July 28, 2011 | Latvia | 0 – 17 (F/5) | Belgium | Antwerp, Belgium; Attendance: 85 |
| July 28, 2011 | | Boxscore | | Antwerp, Belgium; Attendance: 85 |

| July 29, 2011 | Slovakia | 16 – 6 (F/8) | Latvia | Antwerp, Belgium; Attendance: 45 |
| July 29, 2011 | | Boxscore | | Antwerp, Belgium; Attendance: 45 |

| July 29, 2011 | Belgium | 5 – 3 | Poland | Antwerp, Belgium; Attendance: 130 |
| July 29, 2011 | | Boxscore | | Antwerp, Belgium; Attendance: 130 |

=== Final ===
| July 30, 2011 | Belgium | 7 – 1 | Austria | Antwerp, Belgium; Attendance: 160 |
| July 30, 2011 | | Boxscore | | Antwerp, Belgium; Attendance: 160 |

== Pool Barcelona ==
=== Standings ===
| Teams | W | L | Pct. | GB | R | RA |
|---|---|---|---|---|---|---|
| Spain | 4 | 0 | 1.000 | — | 53 | 0 |
| Switzerland | 3 | 1 | .750 | 1 | 38 | 13 |
| Ireland | 2 | 2 | .500 | 2 | 16 | 31 |
| Hungary | 1 | 3 | .250 | 3 | 8 | 36 |
| Finland | 0 | 4 | .000 | 4 | 6 | 41 |

=== Schedule ===
| July 25, 2011 | Ireland | 2 – 13 (F/7) | Switzerland | Barcelona, Spain; Attendance: 62 |
| July 25, 2011 | | Boxscore | | Barcelona, Spain; Attendance: 62 |

| July 25, 2011 | Finland | 0 – 15 (F/6) | Spain | Barcelona, Spain; Attendance: 100 |
| July 25, 2011 | | Boxscore | | Barcelona, Spain; Attendance: 100 |

| July 26, 2011 | Switzerland | 16 – 3 (F/7) | Finland | Barcelona, Spain; Attendance: 40 |
| July 26, 2011 | | Boxscore | | Barcelona, Spain; Attendance: 40 |

| July 26, 2011 | Hungary | 0 – 16 (F/5) | Spain | Barcelona, Spain; Attendance: 200 |
| July 26, 2011 | | Boxscore | | Barcelona, Spain; Attendance: 200 |

| July 27, 2011 | Ireland | 10 – 0 (F/8) | Hungary | Barcelona, Spain; Attendance: 57 |
| July 27, 2011 | | Boxscore | | Barcelona, Spain; Attendance: 57 |

| July 27, 2011 | Spain | 6 – 0 | Switzerland | Barcelona, Spain; Attendance: 125 |
| July 27, 2011 | | Boxscore | | Barcelona, Spain; Attendance: 125 |

| July 28, 2011 | Hungary | 6 – 1 | Finland | Barcelona, Spain; Attendance: 25 |
| July 28, 2011 | | Boxscore | | Barcelona, Spain; Attendance: 25 |

| July 28, 2011 | Spain | 16 – 0 (F/5) | Ireland | Barcelona, Spain; Attendance: 100 |
| July 28, 2011 | | Boxscore | | Barcelona, Spain; Attendance: 100 |

| July 29, 2011 | Finland | 2 – 4 | Ireland | Barcelona, Spain; Attendance: 45 |
| July 29, 2011 | | Boxscore | | Barcelona, Spain; Attendance: 45 |

| July 29, 2011 | Switzerland | 9 – 2 | Hungary | Barcelona, Spain; Attendance: 100 |
| July 29, 2011 | | Boxscore | | Barcelona, Spain; Attendance: 100 |

=== Final ===
| July 30, 2011 | Spain | 3 – 2 | Switzerland | Barcelona, Spain; Attendance: 154 |
| July 30, 2011 | | Boxscore | | Barcelona, Spain; Attendance: 154 |

== Pool Krymsk ==
=== Standings ===
Moldova withdrew.

| Teams | W | L | Pct. | GB | R | RA |
|---|---|---|---|---|---|---|
| Russia | 4 | 0 | 1.000 | — | 30 | 2 |
| Ukraine | 2 | 2 | .500 | 2 | 27 | 19 |
| Belarus | 0 | 4 | .000 | 4 | 4 | 40 |

=== Schedule ===
| July 27, 2011 | Ukraine | 9 – 0 (forfeit) | Belarus | Krymsk, Russia |

| July 27, 2011 | Ukraine | 0 – 7 | Russia | Krymsk, Russia; Attendance: 65 |
| July 27, 2011 | | Boxscore | | Krymsk, Russia; Attendance: 65 |

| July 28, 2011 | Belarus | 4 – 16 (F/7) | Ukraine | Krymsk, Russia; Attendance: 51 |
| July 28, 2011 | | Boxscore | | Krymsk, Russia; Attendance: 51 |

| July 28, 2011 | Belarus | 0 – 5 | Russia | Krymsk, Russia; Attendance: 35 |
| July 28, 2011 | | Boxscore | | Krymsk, Russia; Attendance: 35 |

| July 29, 2011 | Russia | 10 – 0 (F/7) | Belarus | Krymsk, Russia; Attendance: 32 |
| July 29, 2011 | | Boxscore | | Krymsk, Russia; Attendance: 32 |

| July 29, 2011 | Russia | 8 – 2 | Ukraine | Krymsk, Russia; Attendance: 75 |
| July 29, 2011 | | Boxscore | | Krymsk, Russia; Attendance: 75 |

== Pool Tel Aviv ==
=== Standings ===
| Teams | W | L | Pct. | GB | R | RA |
|---|---|---|---|---|---|---|
| Great Britain | 3 | 0 | 1.000 | — | 30 | 16 |
| Israel | 2 | 1 | .667 | 1 | 30 | 11 |
| Lithuania | 1 | 2 | .333 | 2 | 19 | 28 |
| Georgia | 0 | 3 | .000 | 3 | 9 | 33 |

=== Schedule ===
| July 26, 2011 | Lithuania | 3 – 14 (F/7) | Great Britain | Tel Aviv, Israel; Attendance: 40 |
| July 26, 2011 | | Boxscore | | Tel Aviv, Israel; Attendance: 40 |

| July 26, 2011 | Israel | 11 – 1 (F/7) | Georgia | Tel Aviv, Israel; Attendance: 857 |
| July 26, 2011 | | Boxscore | | Tel Aviv, Israel; Attendance: 857 |

| July 27, 2011 | Georgia | 1 – 14 | Lithuania | Tel Aviv, Israel; Attendance: 60 |
| July 27, 2011 | | Boxscore | | Tel Aviv, Israel; Attendance: 60 |

| July 27, 2011 | Great Britain | 8 – 6 | Israel | Tel Aviv, Israel; Attendance: 650 |
| July 27, 2011 | | Boxscore | | Tel Aviv, Israel; Attendance: 650 |

| July 28, 2011 | Georgia | 7 – 8 | Great Britain | Tel Aviv, Israel; Attendance: 75 |
| July 28, 2011 | | Boxscore | | Tel Aviv, Israel; Attendance: 75 |

| July 28, 2011 | Lithuania | 2 – 13 (F/8) | Israel | Tel Aviv, Israel; Attendance: 800 |
| July 28, 2011 | | Boxscore | | Tel Aviv, Israel; Attendance: 800 |

=== Final ===
| July 29, 2011 | Great Britain | 0 – 7 | Israel | Tel Aviv, Israel; Attendance: 472 |
| July 29, 2011 | | Boxscore | | Tel Aviv, Israel; Attendance: 472 |

| July 29, 2011 | Israel | 2 – 5 | Great Britain | Tel Aviv, Israel; Attendance: 320 |
| July 29, 2011 | | Boxscore | | Tel Aviv, Israel; Attendance: 320 |

== Pool Zagreb ==
=== Standings ===
| Teams | W | L | Pct. | GB | R | RA |
|---|---|---|---|---|---|---|
| Croatia | 4 | 0 | 1.000 | — | 45 | 11 |
| Bulgaria | 3 | 1 | .750 | 1 | 32 | 18 |
| Slovenia | 2 | 2 | .500 | 2 | 20 | 16 |
| Romania | 1 | 3 | .250 | 3 | 28 | 23 |
| Serbia | 0 | 4 | .000 | 4 | 6 | 63 |

=== Schedule ===
| July 25, 2011 | Slovenia | 15 – 1 (F/6) | Serbia | Zagreb, Croatia; Attendance: 30 |
| July 25, 2011 | | Boxscore | | Zagreb, Croatia; Attendance: 30 |

| July 25, 2011 | Romania | 5 – 9 | Croatia | Zagreb, Croatia; Attendance: 100 |
| July 25, 2011 | | Boxscore | | Zagreb, Croatia; Attendance: 100 |

| July 26, 2011 | Bulgaria | 13 – 3 (F/7) | Serbia | Zagreb, Croatia; Attendance: 75 |
| July 26, 2011 | | Boxscore | | Zagreb, Croatia; Attendance: 75 |

| July 26, 2011 | Croatia | 10 – 0 (F/7) | Slovenia | Zagreb, Croatia; Attendance: 90 |
| July 26, 2011 | | Boxscore | | Zagreb, Croatia; Attendance: 90 |

| July 27, 2011 | Romania | 5 – 11 | Bulgaria | Zagreb, Croatia; Attendance: 35 |
| July 27, 2011 | | Boxscore | | Zagreb, Croatia; Attendance: 35 |

| July 27, 2011 | Serbia | 2 – 18 (F/7) | Croatia | Zagreb, Croatia; Attendance: 75 |
| July 27, 2011 | | Boxscore | | Zagreb, Croatia; Attendance: 75 |

| July 28, 2011 | Bulgaria | 4 – 2 | Slovenia | Zagreb, Croatia; Attendance: 40 |
| July 28, 2011 | | Boxscore | | Zagreb, Croatia; Attendance: 40 |

| July 28, 2011 | Serbia | 0 – 17 (F/5) | Romania | Zagreb, Croatia; Attendance: 50 |
| July 28, 2011 | | Boxscore | | Zagreb, Croatia; Attendance: 50 |

| July 29, 2011 | Slovenia | 3 – 1 | Romania | Zagreb, Croatia; Attendance: 35 |
| July 29, 2011 | | Boxscore | | Zagreb, Croatia; Attendance: 35 |

| July 29, 2011 | Croatia | 8 – 4 | Bulgaria | Zagreb, Croatia; Attendance: 100 |
| July 29, 2011 | | Boxscore | | Zagreb, Croatia; Attendance: 100 |

=== Final ===
| July 30, 2011 | Croatia | 9 – 4 | Bulgaria | Zagreb, Croatia; Attendance: 50 |
| July 30, 2011 | | Boxscore | | Zagreb, Croatia; Attendance: 50 |
