= 2016 European Baseball Championship – Qualification =

The qualification for the 2016 European Baseball Championship started on July 29, 2014, in Ljubljana, Slovenia.

== C-level qualifier ==
Qualification for 2014 European Baseball Championship B-level Qualification
Tournament details
- Country: Slovenia
- Dates: 29 July – 2 August 2014
- Teams: 8

=== Group A ===
Qualified for Final Stage
Did not qualify for Final Stage

Teams	W	L	Pct.	GB
Ireland	3	0	1.000	0
Romania	2	1	.667	1
Hungary	1	2	.333	2
Norway	0	3	.000	3

=== Group B ===
Qualified for Final Stage
Did not qualify for Final Stage

Teams	W	L	Pct.	GB
Israel	3	0	1.000	0
Slovenia	2	1	.667	1
Finland	1	2	.333	2
Latvia	0	3	.000	3

=== Final stage ===
Semifinals

August 1, 2014	Israel	8 – 3	Romania	Ljubljana, Slovenia; Attendance: 78
August 1, 2014		Boxscore		Ljubljana, Slovenia; Attendance: 78

August 1, 2014	Ireland	3 – 10	Slovenia	Ljubljana, Slovenia; Attendance: 225
August 1, 2014		Boxscore		Ljubljana, Slovenia; Attendance: 225

Final

August 2, 2014	Israel	14 – 0	Slovenia	Ljubljana, Slovenia; Attendance: 257
August 2, 2014		Boxscore		Ljubljana, Slovenia; Attendance: 257

=== Final standings ===
Qualified for B-level Tournament.

#	Teams
1	Israel
2	Slovenia
3	Romania
4	Ireland
5	Finland
6	Latvia
7	Hungary
8	Norway

== B-level qualifier ==
Top team from each group will qualify for the 2016 European Baseball Championship, bottom team from each group will be relegated to C-Pool.

=== Vienna group ===
Qualified for Final Stage
Did not qualify for Final Stage

Teams	W	L	Pct.	GB
Austria	4	1	.800	0
Sweden	4	1	.800	0
Israel	3	2	.600	1
Lithuania	2	3	.400	2
Belarus	1	4	.200	3
Poland	1	4	.200	3

=== Final ===
Aug 1, 2015	Austria	5 – 8	Sweden	Vienna, Austria; Attendance: 950
Aug 1, 2015		Boxscore		Vienna, Austria; Attendance: 950

=== Karlovac group ===
Qualified for Final Stage
Did not qualify for Final Stage

Teams	W	L	Pct.	GB
Croatia	5	0	1.000	0
Slovakia	3	1	.750	1.5
Ukraine	3	2	.600	2
Bulgaria	2	3	.400	3
Switzerland	1	3	.250	3.5
Slovenia	0	5	0	5

The game Slovakia – Switzerland was cancelled.

=== Final ===
Aug 1, 2015	Croatia	6 – 4	Slovakia	Karlovac, Croatia; Attendance: 307
Aug 1, 2015		Boxscore		Karlovac, Croatia; Attendance: 307

Promoted to Pool A 2016	Sweden, Croatia
Relegated to Pool C 2016	Poland, Slovenia
