= 2017 European Under-23 Baseball Championship =

Tournament details
- Countries: Austria; Czech Republic; Slovakia
- Dates: August 7–13
- Teams: 16

Final positions
- Champions: Netherlands (1st title)
- Runners-up: Czech Republic
- Third place: Belgium
- Fourth place: Spain

Tournament statistics
- Games played: 48

Awards
- MVP: (Netherlands) Colin Van Laar

The 2017 European Under-23 Baseball Championship was an international baseball tournament held by the Confederation of European Baseball for players 23-year-old and younger. The 2017 edition was held in Austria (Wels), Czech Republic (Blansko and Brno) and Slovakia (Trnava). The Dutch team won the first ever edition.

== Group stage ==
=== Pool A ===
==== Standings ====
Qualified for the-quarter finals
Did not qualify for the-quarter finals

#	Team	Games	Wins	Losses
1	Netherlands	3	3	0
2	Croatia	3	2	1
3	Russia	3	1	2
4	Belarus	3	0	3

==== Game Results ====
Date	Local time	Road team	Score	Home team	Inn.	Venue	Game duration	Attendance	Boxscore
Aug 7, 2017	16:00	Russia	1-2	Croatia		Brno Hrosi	2:12	50	Boxscore
Aug 7, 2017	18:00	Belarus	0-9	Netherlands		Blansko	2:25	80	Boxscore
Aug 8, 2017	14:00	Netherlands	9-1	Russia		Brno MBS	2:38	50	Boxscore
Aug 8, 2017	18:00	Croatia	18-7	Belarus	F/7	Brno Hrosi	2:50	30	Boxscore
Aug 9, 2017	14:00	Belarus	1-2	Russia	F/10	Brno MBS	2:30	20	Boxscore
Aug 9, 2017	16:00	Croatia	3-18	Netherlands	F/6	Brno Hrosi	2:20	60	Boxscore

=== Pool B ===
==== Standings ====
Qualified for the-quarter finals
Did not qualify for the-quarter finals

#	Team	Games	Wins	Losses
1	Spain	3	3	0
2	Great Britain	3	2	1
3	Poland	3	1	2
4	Austria	3	0	3

==== Game Results ====
Date	Local time	Road team	Score	Home team	Inn.	Venue	Game duration	Attendance	Boxscore
Aug 7, 2017	13:00	Poland	1-5	Spain		Wels	2:31	50	Boxscore
Aug 7, 2017	17:30	Austria	0-10	Great Britain	F/7	Wels	1:54	200	Boxscore
Aug 8, 2017	13:00	Great Britain	13-12	Poland	F/11	Wels	3:29	150	Boxscore
Aug 8, 2017	17:30	Spain	3-0	Austria		Wels	2:19	250	Boxscore
Aug 9, 2017	13:00	Great Britain	1-4	Spain		Wels	2:42	85	Boxscore
Aug 9, 2017	17:30	Austria	11-12	Poland		Wels	3:16	200	Boxscore

=== Pool C ===
==== Standings ====
Qualified for the quarter-finals
Did not qualify for the quarter-finals

#	Team	Games	Wins	Losses
1	Germany	3	3	0
2	France	3	2	1
3	Slovakia	3	1	2
4	Georgia	3	0	3

==== Game Results ====
Date	Local time	Road team	Score	Home team	Inn.	Venue	Game duration	Attendance	Boxscore
Aug 7, 2017	11:00	Georgia	0-24	Germany	F/5	Trnava	1:30	40	Boxscore
Aug 7, 2017	16:00	Slovakia	0-11	France	F/7	Trnava	2:13	320	Boxscore
Aug 8, 2017	11:00	France	24-2	Georgia	F/5	Trnava	2:22	80	Boxscore
Aug 8, 2017	16:00	Germany	21-0	Slovakia	F/5	Trnava	1:55	240	Boxscore
Aug 9, 2017	11:00	France	8-9	Germany		Trnava	3:27	120	Boxscore
Aug 9, 2017	16:00	Georgia	4-15	Slovakia	F/7	Trnava	2:24	180	Boxscore

=== Pool D ===
==== Standings ====
Qualified for the-quarter finals
Did not qualify for the-quarter finals

#	Team	Games	Wins	Losses
1	Czech Republic	3	3	0
2	Belgium	3	2	1
3	Ukraine	3	1	2
4	Lithuania	3	0	3

==== Game Results ====
Date	Local time	Road team	Score	Home team	Inn.	Venue	Game duration	Attendance	Boxscore
Aug 7, 2017	14:00	Ukraine	3-8	Belgium		Brno MBS	2:50	60	Boxscore
Aug 7, 2017	19:00	Lithuania	0-15	Czech Republic	F/7	Brno MBS	2:24	280	Boxscore
Aug 8, 2017	18:00	Belgium	8-0	Lithuania		Blansko	2:55	90	Boxscore
Aug 8, 2017	19:00	Czech Republic	12-1	Ukraine	F/7	Brno MBS	2:30	300	Boxscore
Aug 9, 2017	18:00	Lithuania	5-15	Ukraine	F/7	Blansko	3:10	50	Boxscore
Aug 9, 2017	19:00	Belgium	0-17	Czech Republic	F/5	Brno MBS	1:50	300	Boxscore

== Second stage ==
=== Pool E (9º-12º) ===
==== Standings ====
#	Team	Games	Wins	Losses
1	Ukraine	3	3	0
2	Poland	3	1	2
3	Russia	3	1	2
4	Slovakia	3	1	2

==== Game Results ====
Date	Local time	Road team	Score	Home team	Inn.	Venue	Game duration	Attendance	Boxscore
Aug 10, 2017	15:00	Ukraine	10-7	Russia		Brno MBS	3:00	20	Boxscore
Aug 11, 2017	11:00	Slovakia	4-17	Poland	F/8	Brno MBS	2:42	50	Boxscore
Aug 12, 2017	11:00	Poland	2-10	Ukraine		Brno Technika	2:32	20	Boxscore
Aug 12, 2017	18:00	Russia	1-3	Slovakia		Blansko	2:31	50	Boxscore
Aug 13, 2017	11:00	Russia	8-1	Poland		Brno Hrosi	2:23	30	Boxscore
Aug 13, 2017	11:00	Ukraine	10-6	Slovakia	F/10	Brno Technika	3:17	30	Boxscore

=== Pool F (13º-16º) ===
==== Standings ====
#	Team	Games	Wins	Losses
1	Austria	3	3	0
2	Belarus	3	2	1
3	Lithuania	3	1	2
4	Georgia	3	0	3

==== Game Results ====
Date	Local time	Road team	Score	Home team	Inn.	Venue	Game duration	Attendance	Boxscore
Aug 10, 2017	15:00	Lithuania	0-14	Belarus	F/7	Brno Hrosi	2:40	50	Boxscore
Aug 11, 2017	13:20	Georgia	4-17	Austria	F/5	Brno Hrosi	1:25	50	Boxscore
Aug 12, 2017	13:00	Belarus	13-3	Georgia	F/7	Brno Hrosi	2:25	25	Boxscore
Aug 12, 2017	17:00	Austria	8-3	Lithuania		Brno Technika	3:00	45	Boxscore
Aug 13, 2017	15:00	Austria	4-3	Belarus		Blansko	1:51	50	Boxscore
Aug 13, 2017	15:30	Lithuania	8-0	Georgia		Brno Technika	2:34	30	Boxscore

== Quarter-finals ==
August 11 15:00 at Brno MBS (F/7)
Team	1	2	3	4	5	6	7	8	9	R	H	E
Netherlands	0	2	0	0	0	2	7	X	X	11	10	0
Great Britain	1	0	0	0	0	0	0	X	X	1	6	2
WP: Kaj Timmermans (2−0) LP: Conrad Cornell (0−1); Home runs: NED: None; GBR: Hayden Platt (1); Attendance: 160; Notes: Mercy rule was used in 7th Boxscore

August 11 17:00 at Brno Hrosi (F/8)
Team	1	2	3	4	5	6	7	8	9	R	H	E
Croatia	0	0	0	0	0	0	0	0	X	0	1	3
Spain	2	0	0	0	1	0	0	7	X	10	16	1
WP: Eric Páez (2−0) LP: Kruno Gojkovic (0−1); Attendance: 85; Notes: Mercy rule was used in 8th Boxscore

August 11 18:00 at Blansko
Team	1	2	3	4	5	6	7	8	9	R	H	E
Belgium	0	0	0	2	0	0	0	1	0	3	7	1
Germany	0	0	1	0	0	0	0	0	0	1	6	0
WP: Drew Janssen (2−0) LP: Mark Harrison (0−1); Attendance: 103; Boxscore

August 11 19:00 at Brno MBS
Team	1	2	3	4	5	6	7	8	9	R	H	E
France	0	0	0	0	0	0	1	0	0	1	7	2
Czech Republic	0	0	0	0	2	3	0	0	X	5	8	1
WP: Ondřej Satoria (1−0) LP: Jonathan Mottay (0−1); Home runs: FRA: None; CZE: Marek Chlup (2), Martin Muzik (3); Attendance: 400; Boxscore

== 5th-8th Places ==
August 12 11:00 at Brno MBS
Team	1	2	3	4	5	6	7	8	9	R	H	E
Great Britain	0	0	2	0	0	0	7	0	1	3	5	0
Germany	0	0	0	2	1	0	0	2	X	5	7	1
WP: Sascha Koch (1−0) LP: Nolan Bond (1−1) Sv: Luis Santa Cruz (1); Home runs: GBR: None; GER: Maik Ehmcke (1); Attendance: 120; Boxscore

August 12 17:00 at Brno Hrosi
Team	1	2	3	4	5	6	7	8	9	R	H	E
France	0	1	0	0	3	1	4	0	0	9	12	3
Croatia	0	0	1	1	0	0	1	0	0	3	7	2
WP: Maxence Esteban (1−0) LP: Vidrac Fran Stancic (0−1); Attendance: 22; Boxscore

August 13 10:00 at Brno MBS
Team	1	2	3	4	5	6	7	8	9	R	H	E
France	0	0	0	0	0	0	1	0	0	1	5	4
Germany	0	0	1	4	0	0	0	0	X	5	5	0
WP: Niklas Rimmel (1−0) LP: Gedeon Coste (0−1) Sv: Florian Seidel (1); Attendance: 75; Boxscore

August 13 19:00 at Brno Technika
Team	1	2	3	4	5	6	7	8	9	R	H	E
Croatia	0	1	0	0	2	0	0	0	1	4	11	4
Great Britain	2	7	0	0	1	2	0	0	X	5	8	1
WP: Elijah Hackney-Rose (1−0) LP: Hrvoje Jerbic (0−2); Attendance: 100; Boxscore

== Semi-finals ==
August 12 15:00 at Brno MBS
Team	1	2	3	4	5	6	7	8	9	R	H	E
Netherlands	0	3	2	1	0	0	2	0	1	10	16	2
Belgium	3	0	0	0	2	0	0	0	0	5	12	1
WP: Maickel Rietel (1−0) LP: Kyran Weemaels (0−1); Attendance: 150; Boxscore

August 12 19:00 at Brno MBS
Team	1	2	3	4	5	6	7	8	9	R	H	E
Czech Republic	0	0	0	3	4	0	0	0	0	7	7	2
Spain	0	0	0	0	1	0	2	0	0	3	7	2
WP: Jan Novak (1−0) LP: Francisco González (1−1); Attendance: 450; Boxscore

== 3rd-place game ==
August 13 14:00 at Brno MBS (F/10)
Team	1	2	3	4	5	6	7	8	9	10	R	H	E
Belgium	1	0	0	1	0	0	0	0	0	1	3	7	4
Spain	0	0	0	0	0	0	1	1	0	0	2	4	0
WP: Lucas Rizzi (1−0) LP: Starlyn Yoel Taveras (0−1); Attendance: 120; Notes: Extra inning rule was used in 10th Boxscore

== Final ==
August 13 19:00 at Brno MBS (F/10)
Team	1	2	3	4	5	6	7	8	9	10	R	H	E
Netherlands	1	0	0	0	0	5	1	1	0	2	10	10	0
Czech Republic	3	1	1	0	0	1	0	0	2	1	9	9	2
WP: Colin Van Laar (1−0) LP: Ondřej Satoria (1−1); Attendance: 1,000; Notes: Extra inning rule was used in 10th Boxscore

== Final standings ==
Rk	Team	W	L	Pct.
1st place, gold medalist(s)	Netherlands	6	0	1.000
Lost in gold medal game
2nd place, silver medalist(s)	Czech Republic	5	1	.833
Failed to qualify for gold medal game
3rd place, bronze medalist(s)	Belgium	4	2	.667
4	Spain	4	2	.667
Failed to qualify for the semi-finals
5	Germany	5	1	.800
6	France	3	3	.500
7	Great Britain	2	4	.333
8	Croatia	2	4	.333
Failed to qualify for the quarter-finals
9	Ukraine	4	2	.667
10	Poland	2	4	.333
11	Russia	2	4	.333
12	Slovakia	2	4	.333
Failed to qualify for the Pool E
13	Austria	3	3	.500
14	Belarus	2	4	.333
15	Lithuania	1	5	.167
16	Georgia	0	6	.000

== Statistics leaders ==
=== Batting ===
Statistic	Name	Total/Avg
Batting average*	(Netherlands) Max Clarijs	.833
Hits	(Netherlands) Denzel Richardson	13
Runs	(Czech Republic) Vojtech Mensik (Netherlands) Denzel Richardson	12
Home runs	(Czech Republic) Martin Muzik	4
RBI	(Czech Republic) Martin Muzik	13
Walks	(Czech Republic) Vojtech Mensik	11
Strikeouts	(France) Bastian Dagneau	9
Stolen bases	(Russia) Daniil Khomyakov	4
On-base percentage*	(Czech Republic) Martin Muzik	.704
Slugging percentage*	(Czech Republic) Martin Muzik	1.263
OPS*	(Czech Republic) Martin Muzik	1.967

* Minimum 1.0 AB per team game

=== Pitching ===
Statistic	Name	Total/Avg
Wins	(Belgium) Drew Janssen (Spain) Eric Páez (Germany) Luis Santa Cruz (Netherlands) Kaj Timmermans	2
Losses	6 players	2
Saves	7 players	1
Innings pitched	(Belgium) Robin Roevens	18.0
Hits allowed	(Georgia (country)) Giorgi Jalabadze	23
Runs allowed	(Georgia (country)) Jumberi Beinashvili	19
Earned runs allowed	(Croatia) Hrvoje Herbic (Georgia (country)) Jumberi Beinashvili	15
ERA*	(Belgium) Robin Roevens	0.00
Walks	(Georgia (country)) Jumberi Beinashvili	16
Strikeouts	(Russia) Maksin Makarkin	23

* Minimum 1.5 inning pitched per team game
