= 2014 European Baseball Championship – Qualification =

Qualification for 2014 European Baseball Championship
Tournament details
- Countries: Austria; Switzerland
- Dates: 22 – 27 July 2013
- Teams: 12

The qualification for the 2014 European Baseball Championship was held from July 22 to 27, 2013 in Vienna, Austria and Zürich, Switzerland. 12 teams, qualified based on their recent results and a CEB ranking spanning the last ten years, will have the chance to play this B-Level Qualifier to qualify for 2 spots available among the 10 already qualified teams from the 2012 competition. These are, Belgium, Croatia, Czech Republic, France, Germany, Greece, Italy, the Netherlands, Spain and Sweden.

== Pool Vienna ==
=== Standings ===
Qualified for Final
Did not qualify for Final

Teams	W	L	Pct.	R	RA
Austria	4	1	.800	31	16
Russia	4	1	.800	38	18
Belarus	4	1	.800	30	26
Slovakia	2	3	.400	30	32
Lithuania	1	4	.200	21	26
Ireland	0	5	.000	16	48

=== Final ===
July 27, 2013	Austria	2 – 3	Russia	Vienna, Austria; Attendance: 1,000
July 27, 2013		Boxscore		Vienna, Austria; Attendance: 1,000

== Pool Zürich ==
=== Standings ===
Qualified for Final
Did not qualify for Final

Teams	W	L	Pct.	R	RA
Great Britain	5	0	1.000	49	14
Ukraine	3	2	.600	34	26
Bulgaria	3	2	.600	27	22
Poland	2	3	.400	28	39
Switzerland	2	3	.400	25	23
Slovenia	0	5	.000	16	55

=== Final ===
July 27, 2013	Great Britain	2 – 0	Ukraine	Zürich, Switzerland; Attendance: 720
July 27, 2013		Boxscore		Zürich, Switzerland; Attendance: 720

Promoted to Pool A 2014	Russia, Great Britain
Relegated to Pool C 2014	Ireland, Slovenia
