= Latvian Baseball Federation =

Sports governing body in Latvia

- Abbreviation: LBF
- Formation: 2007
- Type: Sport governing body
- Legal status: Inactive
- Purpose: managing one baseball league, and governing the adulthood national team
- Headquarters: Riga, Latvia
- Region served: Domestic
- Members: Confederation of European Baseball, International Baseball Federation
- Official language: Latvian
- Website: http://www.beisbols.lv

The Latvian Baseball Federation (LBF) (Latvian: Latvijas Beisbola federācija) is the governing body for the amateur league of baseball in Latvia. LBF was founded in 2007 and has been governing one league.

LBF is a member of the Confederation of European Baseball (CEB), and is responsible for the national baseball team for the European Baseball Championship and Latvian Baseball League

As of 2025, the Latvian Baseball Federation is de facto defunct and no longer organizing baseball activities; its responsibilities have been taken over by the volunteer-led organization Latvijas Beisbola un Softbola savienība (LBSS).
