= 2023 U-15 Baseball European Championship =

Tournament details
- Country: Slovakia
- Dates: July 18 – 22
- Teams: 7
- Defending champions: Czech Republic

Final positions
- Champions: Netherlands
- Runners-up: Italy
- Third place: Czech Republic
- Fourth place: France

Tournament statistics
- Games played: 15

The 2023 U-15 Baseball European Championship was the 31st edition of the U-15 Baseball European Championship, organised by Europe's governing baseball body, the WBSC Europe. The tournament was held in Trnava, Slovakia from 18 to 22 July 2023. The top two teams of the tournament will qualify for the 2024 U-15 Baseball World Cup.

In the final, Netherlands defeated the Italy 14–4 to claim their thirteenth title. Netherlands and Italy qualified for 2024 U-15 Baseball World Cup.

== Participating teams ==
- Czech Republic
- France
- Germany
- Hungary
- Italy
- Netherlands
- Slovakia

== Round robin ==
=== Group A ===
Pos	Team	Pld	W	L	RF	RA	PCT	GB	Qualification
1	Italy	3	3	0	33	19	1.000	—	Advance to Semifinal
2	Czech Republic	3	2	1	32	15	.667	1	Advance to Semifinal
3	Germany	3	1	2	30	20	.333	2	Advance to Classification round
4	Hungary	3	0	3	10	51	.000	3	Advance to Classification round

Source: WBSC Europe

Date	Local time	Road team	Score	Home team	Inn.	Venue	Game duration	Attendance	Boxscore
Jul 18, 2023	10:00	Hungary	3–13	Czech Republic	6	Baseballový klub STU Angels Trnava	2:23	120	Boxscore
Jul 18, 2023	13:30	Germany	6–7	Italy	7	Baseballový klub STU Angels Trnava	2:36	120	Boxscore
Jul 19, 2023	10:00	Hungary	6–16	Italy	5	Baseballový klub STU Angels Trnava	2:46	120	Boxscore
Jul 19, 2023	13:30	Czech Republic	12–2	Germany	6	Baseballový klub STU Angels Trnava			Boxscore
Jul 20, 2023	10:00	Germany	22–1	Hungary	4	Baseballový klub STU Angels Trnava	1:58	60	Boxscore
Jul 20, 2023	13:30	Italy	10–7	Czech Republic	7	Baseballový klub STU Angels Trnava	3:01	120	Boxscore

=== Group B ===
Pos	Team	Pld	W	L	RF	RA	PCT	GB	Qualification
1	Netherlands	2	2	0	30	11	1.000	—	Advance to Semifinal
2	France	2	1	1	25	13	.500	1	Advance to Semifinal
3	Slovakia (H)	2	0	2	2	33	.000	2	Advance to Classification round

Source: WBSC Europe
(H) Hosts

Date	Local time	Road team	Score	Home team	Inn.	Venue	Game duration	Attendance	Boxscore
Jul 18, 2023	17:00	France	16–0	Slovakia	4	Baseballový klub STU Angels Trnava	1:24	185	Boxscore
Jul 19, 2023	17:00	Netherlands	13–9	France	7	Baseballový klub STU Angels Trnava	3:03	205	Boxscore
Jul 20, 2023	17:00	Slovakia	2–17	Netherlands	4	Baseballový klub STU Angels Trnava	1:38	150	Boxscore

== Classification round ==
Pos	Team	Pld	W	L	RF	RA	PCT	GB
1	Germany	2	2	0	44	1	1.000	—
2	Hungary	2	1	1	9	26	.500	1
3	Slovakia (H)	2	0	2	4	30	.000	2

Source: WBSC Europe
(H) Hosts

Date	Local time	Road team	Score	Home team	Inn.	Venue	Game duration	Attendance	Boxscore
Jul 21, 2023	10:00	Hungary	8–4	Slovakia	7	Baseballový klub STU Angels Trnava	2:17	110	Boxscore
Jul 22, 2023	10:00	Germany	22–0	Slovakia	3	Baseballový klub STU Angels Trnava	1:19	138	Boxscore

== Final round ==
Semifinals
21 July
Italy	10
France	9
21 July
Netherlands	13
Czech Republic	9

Final
22 July
Italy	4
Netherlands	14
3rd place match
22 July
France	6
Czech Republic	20

=== Semifinals ===
Date	Local time	Road team	Score	Home team	Inn.	Venue	Game duration	Attendance	Boxscore
Jul 21, 2023	13:30	Czech Republic	9–13	Netherlands	7	Baseballový klub STU Angels Trnava	3:13	140	Boxscore
Jul 21, 2023	17:00	France	9–10	Italy	7	Baseballový klub STU Angels Trnava	2:46	180	Boxscore

=== 3rd place match ===
Date	Local time	Road team	Score	Home team	Inn.	Venue	Game duration	Attendance	Boxscore
Jul 22, 2023	13:30	Czech Republic	20–6	France	6	Baseballový klub STU Angels Trnava	2:40	200	Boxscore

=== Final ===
Date	Local time	Road team	Score	Home team	Inn.	Venue	Game duration	Attendance	Boxscore
Jul 22, 2023	17:00	Italy	4–14	Netherlands	5	Baseballový klub STU Angels Trnava	2:18	350	Boxscore

== Final standing ==
Rank	Team
1st place, gold medalist(s)	Netherlands
2nd place, silver medalist(s)	Italy
3rd place, bronze medalist(s)	Czech Republic
4	France
5	Germany
6	Hungary
7	Slovakia

Qualified for the 2024 U-15 World Cup
Relegated to the 2024 U-15 European Championship B Pool

== External websites ==
- Official website
