= 1971 European Baseball Championship =

Tournament details
- Country: Italy
- Dates: 5–12 September
- Teams: 9
- Defending champions: Netherlands

Final positions
- Champions: Netherlands (9th title)
- Runners-up: Italy
- Third place: Germany
- Fourth place: Belgium

Tournament statistics
- Games played: 22

The 1971 European Baseball Championship was held in Parma and Bologna, Italy and was won by the Netherlands for the second time in a row. Italy finished second. The Netherlands lost the second game of the three-game championship to Italy, the Dutch team's first loss in tournament history. The Netherlands won the winner-take-all final game, which was delayed by rain. In the second game of the championship series, 5,000 fans watched Italy win 1–0.

San Marino, in its first tournament, defeated Great Britain and Spain.

Italy began recruiting Italian-American players for international competitions in 1971. The team had previously complained that the Netherlands had an unfair advantage by fielding players from the Netherlands Antilles.

== Format ==
The nine-team field was the largest yet in tournament history. Teams were split into two groups that played a single round-robin competition. The top two teams played a three-game championship series while the second-, third-, and fourth-place teams in each group faced each other in a one-game playoff to determine the final standings. The lone fifth-place team in group play, France, was determined to finish last in the competition without a playoff.

== Standings ==
Pos.	Team	W	L
1	Netherlands	6	1
2	Italy	4	2
3	Germany	3	1
4	Belgium	3	2
5	San Marino	2	2
6	Spain	2	3
7	Great Britain	1	3
8	Sweden	1	4
9	France	0	4
