= Latvia national baseball team =

Information
- Country: Latvia
- Federation: Latvian Baseball Federation
- Confederation: Confederation of European Baseball

WBSC ranking
- Current: NR (26 October 2026)

The Latvia national baseball team is the national baseball team of Latvia. The team represents Latvia in international competitions. It has played in the 2012 European Qualification and Interlyga tournaments.

== 2011 team roster ==
Latvia roster – 2012 European Baseball Championship – Qualification
Official roster		Coaching staff
Pitchers: 5 Jānis Dūšelis; 6 Andis Ansons; 7 Didzis Doveika	Catchers: 1 Kalvis Krapāns; 25 Andris Gūtmanis; Infielders: 3 Kristaps Dūšelis; 8 Agris Skrastiņš; 9 Artūrs Knopkens; 34 Jānis Ertners; 55 Toms Strūbergs; 77 Igors Aleksejevs; 88 Jānis Upenieks; Outfielders: 13 Alvils Samoilovs; 18 Ņikita Stašūns; 45 Mārtiņš Arbidāns; 51 Ritvars Rimicāns; 69 Rolands Reksnis; 96 Juris Geida	Coaches: Kristaps Aldiņš (Head Coach)
Updated July 25, 2011
