= European Men's U23 Baseball Championship =

Biennial baseball tournament

- Current season, competition or edition: 2025 European Under-23 Baseball Championship
- Sport: Baseball
- No. of teams: 8 (2025)
- Continent: Europe
- Most recent champions: Great Britain (1st title)
- Most titles: Netherlands (3 titles)

The U-23 Baseball European Championship is held biennially between national baseball teams in Europe, governed by the WBSC Europe. It was previously governed by the Confederation of European Baseball (CEB).

== Results ==
Ed.	Year	Final Host	Final			Semifinalists	
Ed.	Year	Final Host	Champions	Score	Runners-up	3rd place	4th place
1	2017; Details	(Austria) / (Czech Republic) / (Slovakia); Brno/Blansko/Wels/Trnava	Netherlands	10–9	Czech Republic	Belgium	Spain
2	2019; Details	(Czech Republic) Prague	Czech Republic	4–1	Germany	Belgium	France
3	2021; Details	(Italy) Verona	Netherlands	6–1	Germany	Italy	Great Britain
4	2023; Details	(Austria) Wiener Neustadt	Netherlands	23–5	Great Britain	France	Germany
5	2025; Details	(Czech Republic) Třebíč	Great Britain	9–7	Czech Republic	Netherlands	Italy
6	2027; Details	(Czech Republic) Brno					

== Medal table ==
Rank	Nation	Gold	Silver	Bronze	Total
1	Netherlands	3	0	1	4
2	Czech Republic	1	2	0	3
3	Great Britain	1	1	0	2
4	Germany	0	2	0	2
5	Belgium	0	0	2	2
6	France	0	0	1	1
6	Italy	0	0	1	1
Totals (7 entries)		5	5	5	15

== Participating nations ==
Host country

Nation	2017 (16)	2019 (8)	2021 (8)	2023 (8)	2025 (8)	Total
Austria	13th			7th	6th	3
Belarus	14th					1
Belgium	3rd	3rd	7th	8th		4
Croatia	8th	8th				2
Czech Republic	2nd	1st	5th	6th	2nd	5
France	6th	4th	6th	3rd	5th	5
Georgia	16th					1
Germany	5th	2nd	2nd	4th	7th	5
Great Britain	7th	5th	4th	2nd	1st	5
Israel					8th	1
Italy			3rd	5th	4th	3
Lithuania	15th					1
Netherlands	1st	6th	1st	1st	3rd	5
Poland	10th					1
Russia	11th					1
Slovakia	12th					1
Spain	4th					1
Ukraine	9th	7th	8th			3
