= 2026 U-12 Baseball European Championship =

Tournament details
- Country: France
- Dates: July 7 – 11
- Teams: 8
- Defending champions: Czech Republic

Final positions
- Champions: Germany (5th title)
- Runners-up: Czech Republic
- Third place: Italy; Netherlands

Tournament statistics
- Games played: 20

The 2026 U-12 Baseball European Championship is the 34th edition of the U-12 Baseball European Championship, organised by Europe's governing baseball body, the WBSC Europe. The tournament is held in Évry-Courcouronnes, France from 7 to 11 July 2026. The top two teams of the tournament will qualify for the 2027 U-12 Baseball World Cup.

In the final, Germany defeated the Czech Republic 6–4 to claim their fifth title. Two placement matches and the third-place match were cancelled due to severe weather warnings.

== Participating teams ==
- Belgium
- Czech Republic
- France
- Germany
- Great Britain ▲ (Runners-up, 2025 U-12 European Championship B Pool)
- Italy
- Netherlands
- Spain ▲ (Winners, 2025 U-12 European Championship B Pool)

== Round robin ==
=== Group A ===
Pos	Team	Pld	W	L	RF	RA	PCT	GB	Qualification
1	Czech Republic	3	3	0	42	10	1.000	—	Advance to Semifinal
2	Germany	3	2	1	26	12	.667	1	Advance to Semifinal
3	France (H)	3	1	2	22	19	.333	2	Advance to Classification round
4	Great Britain	3	0	3	7	56	.000	3	Advance to Classification round

Source: WBSC Europe
(H) Hosts

Date	Local time	Road team	Score	Home team	Inn.	Venue	Game duration	Attendance	Boxscore
Jul 7, 2026	13:00	Germany	5–11	Czech Republic		Pharaons Field	2:05	167	Boxscore
Jul 7, 2026	15:45	Great Britain	6–17	France	5	Pharaons Field	2:14	156	Boxscore
Jul 8, 2026	10:30	Czech Republic	23–0	Great Britain	3	Pharaons Field	1:17	112	Boxscore
Jul 8, 2026	18:00	France	0–5	Germany		Pharaons Field	1:35	198	Boxscore
Jul 9, 2026	13:00	Great Britain	1–16	Germany	4	Pharaons Field	1:05	131	Boxscore
Jul 9, 2026	18:00	France	5–8	Czech Republic		Pharaons Field	1:42	173	Boxscore

=== Group B ===
Pos	Team	Pld	W	L	RF	RA	PCT	GB	Qualification
1	Italy	3	3	0	22	7	1.000	—	Advance to Semifinal
2	Netherlands	3	2	1	17	7	.667	1	Advance to Semifinal
3	Belgium	3	1	2	7	27	.333	2	Advance to Classification round
4	Spain	3	0	3	15	20	.000	3	Advance to Classification round

Source: WBSC Europe

Date	Local time	Road team	Score	Home team	Inn.	Venue	Game duration	Attendance	Boxscore
Jul 7, 2026	10:30	Netherlands	2–3	Italy		Pharaons Field	1:42	150	Boxscore
Jul 7, 2026	18:15	Spain	6–7	Belgium		Pharaons Field	2:14	125	Boxscore
Jul 8, 2026	13:00	Italy	8–5	Spain		Pharaons Field	2:07	131	Boxscore
Jul 8, 2026	15:30	Belgium	0–10	Netherlands	5	Pharaons Field	1:42	161	Boxscore
Jul 9, 2026	10:30	Belgium	0–11	Italy	5	Pharaons Field	1:40	121	Boxscore
Jul 9, 2026	15:30	Spain	4–5	Netherlands		Pharaons Field	1:41	187	Boxscore

== Classification round ==
Pos	Team	Pld	W	L	RF	RA	PCT	GB
1	Belgium	2	2	0	12	7	1.000	—
2	Spain	2	1	1	17	13	.500	1
3	France (H)	2	1	1	23	17	.500	1
4	Great Britain	2	0	2	7	22	.000	2

Source: WBSC Europe
(H) Hosts

Date	Local time	Road team	Score	Home team	Inn.	Venue	Game duration	Attendance	Boxscore
Jul 10, 2026	10:30	Great Britain	1–5	Belgium		Pharaons Field	1:29	89	Boxscore
Jul 10, 2026	13:00	Spain	11–6	France		Pharaons Field	2:25	107	Boxscore
Jul 10, 2026	20:00	France	–	Belgium		Pharaons Field			Canceled
Jul 11, 2026	8:00	Spain	–	Great Britain		Pharaons Field			Canceled

== Final round ==
Semifinals
10 July – Évry-Courcouronnes
Czech Republic	8
Netherlands	0
10 July – Évry-Courcouronnes
Italy	3
Germany	11

Final
11 July – Évry-Courcouronnes
Czech Republic	3
Germany	6
3rd place match
11 July – Évry-Courcouronnes
Netherlands
Italy

=== Semifinals ===
Date	Local time	Road team	Score	Home team	Inn.	Venue	Game duration	Attendance	Boxscore
Jul 10, 2026	15:30	Germany	11–3	Italy		Pharaons Field	2:23	229	Boxscore
Jul 10, 2026	18:00	Netherlands	0–8	Czech Republic		Pharaons Field	1:41		Boxscore

=== 3rd place match ===
Date	Local time	Road team	Score	Home team	Inn.	Venue	Game duration	Attendance	Boxscore
Jul 11, 2026	15:30	Netherlands	–	Italy		Pharaons Field			Canceled

=== Final ===
Date	Local time	Road team	Score	Home team	Inn.	Venue	Game duration	Attendance	Boxscore
Jul 11, 2026	10:00	Czech Republic	4–6	Germany		Pharaons Field	1:26	350	Boxscore

== Final standing ==
Rank	Team
1st place, gold medalist(s)	Germany
2nd place, silver medalist(s)	Czech Republic
3rd place, bronze medalist(s)	Italy
3rd place, bronze medalist(s)	Netherlands
5	Belgium
6	Spain
7	France
8	Great Britain

Qualified for the 2027 U-12 World Cup
Relegated to the 2027 U-12 European Championship B Pool

== External websites ==
- Official website
