= 2025 U-15 Baseball European Championship =

Tournament details
- Country: Italy
- Dates: July 15 – 19
- Teams: 8
- Defending champions: Netherlands

Final positions
- Champions: Germany
- Runners-up: Czech Republic
- Third place: Netherlands
- Fourth place: Italy

Tournament statistics
- Games played: 20

The 2025 U-15 Baseball European Championship was the 32nd edition of the U-15 Baseball European Championship, organised by Europe's governing baseball body, the WBSC Europe. The tournament was held in Trieste, Italy from 15 to 19 July 2025. The top two teams of the tournament will qualify for the 2026 U-15 Baseball World Cup.

In the final, Germany defeated the Czech Republic 12–2 to claim their fourth title.

== Participating teams ==
- Belgium ▲ (Winners, 2024 U-15 European Championship B Pool Group Croatia)
- Czech Republic
- France
- Germany
- Great Britain ▲ (Winners, 2024 U-15 European Championship B Pool Group Lithuanina)
- Hungary
- Italy
- Netherlands

== Round robin ==
=== Group A ===
Pos	Team	Pld	W	L	RF	RA	PCT	GB	Qualification
1	Netherlands	3	3	0	35	8	1.000	—	Advance to Semifinal
2	Germany	3	2	1	39	18	.667	1	Advance to Semifinal
3	France	3	1	2	16	22	.333	2	Advance to Classification round
4	Belgium	3	0	3	3	45	.000	3	Advance to Classification round

Source: WBSC Europe

Date	Local time	Road team	Score	Home team	Inn.	Venue	Game duration	Attendance	Boxscore
Jul 15, 2025	10:00	Belgium	0–15	Netherlands	4	Stadio di Prosecco	1:45	150	Boxscore
Jul 15, 2025	10:00	Germany	13–4	France	7	Campo Baseball Opicina	2:30	120	Boxscore
Jul 16, 2025	10:00	France	7–0	Belgium	7	Stadio di Prosecco	2:24	150	Boxscore
Jul 16, 2025	13:30	Netherlands	11–3	Germany	7	Stadio di Prosecco	3:16	140	Boxscore
Jul 17, 2025	11:00	Belgium	3–23	Germany	3	Campo Baseball Opicina	1:36	72	Boxscore
Jul 17, 2025	13:30	France	5–9	Netherlands	7	Stadio di Prosecco	2:36	100	Boxscore

=== Group B ===
Pos	Team	Pld	W	L	RF	RA	PCT	GB	Qualification
1	Italy (H)	3	3	0	34	12	1.000	—	Advance to Semifinal
2	Czech Republic	3	2	1	38	16	.667	1	Advance to Semifinal
3	Great Britain	3	1	2	27	20	.333	2	Advance to Classification round
4	Hungary	3	0	3	7	58	.000	3	Advance to Classification round

Source: WBSC Europe
(H) Hosts

Date	Local time	Road team	Score	Home team	Inn.	Venue	Game duration	Attendance	Boxscore
Jul 15, 2025	13;30	Hungary	0–20	Czech Republic	3	Campo Baseball Opicina	1:31	85	Boxscore
Jul 15, 2025	17:00	Great Britain	3–4	Italy	7	Stadio di Prosecco	2:20	300	Boxscore
Jul 16, 2025	11:00	Czech Republic	11–3	Great Britain	7	Campo Baseball Opicina	2:25	150	Boxscore
Jul 16, 2025	17:00	Italy	17–2	Hungary	4	Stadio di Prosecco	1:49	120	Boxscore
Jul 17, 2025	10:00	Great Britain	21–5	Hungary	4	Stadio di Prosecco	1:51	47	Boxscore
Jul 17, 2025	17:00	Czech Republic	7–13	Italy	6	Stadio di Prosecco		50	Boxscore

== Classification round ==
Pos	Team	Pld	W	L	RF	RA	PCT	GB
1	Great Britain	3	3	0	47	13	1.000	—
2	France	3	2	1	27	16	.667	1
3	Belgium	3	1	2	17	29	.333	2
4	Hungary	3	0	3	17	50	.000	3

Source: WBSC Europe

Date	Local time	Road team	Score	Home team	Inn.	Venue	Game duration	Attendance	Boxscore
Jul 18, 2025	10:00	Belgium	0–15	Great Britain	4	Stadio di Prosecco	1:26	50	Boxscore
Jul 18, 2025	11:00	Hungary	5–12	France	7	Campo Baseball Opicina	2:25	50	Boxscore
Jul 19, 2025	10:00	Great Britain	11–8	France	7	Stadio di Prosecco	2:42	75	Boxscore
Jul 19, 2025	11:00	Hungary	7–17	Belgium	6	Campo Baseball Opicina	2:44	70	Boxscore

== Final round ==
Semifinals
18 July – Trieste
Netherlands	6
Czech Republic	8
18 July – Trieste
Italy	2
Germany	6

Final
19 July – Trieste
Czech Republic	2
Germany	12
3rd place match
19 July – Trieste
Netherlands	11
Italy	10

=== Semifinals ===
Date	Local time	Road team	Score	Home team	Inn.	Venue	Game duration	Attendance	Boxscore
Jul 18, 2025	13:30	Czech Republic	8–6	Netherlands	7	Stadio di Prosecco	3:02	200	Boxscore
Jul 18, 2025	17:00	Germany	6–2	Italy	7	Stadio di Prosecco			Boxscore

=== 3rd place match ===
Date	Local time	Road team	Score	Home team	Inn.	Venue	Game duration	Attendance	Boxscore
Jul 19, 2025	13:30	Italy	10–11	Netherlands	7	Stadio di Prosecco	3:50	300	Boxscore

=== Final ===
Date	Local time	Road team	Score	Home team	Inn.	Venue	Game duration	Attendance	Boxscore
Jul 19, 2025	17:00	Czech Republic	2–12	Germany	6	Stadio di Prosecco	2:04	400	Boxscore

== Final standing ==
Rank	Team
1st place, gold medalist(s)	Germany
2nd place, silver medalist(s)	Czech Republic
3rd place, bronze medalist(s)	Netherlands
4	Italy
5	Great Britain
6	France
7	Belgium
8	Hungary

Qualified for the 2026 U-15 World Cup
Relegated to the 2026 U-15 European Championship B Pool

== External websites ==
- Official website
