= Ekstraliga Baseball =

- Current season, competition or edition: 2026
- Sport: Baseball
- Founded: 1984
- No. of teams: 8
- Country: Poland
- Most recent champion: Barons Wrocław (2026)
- Most titles: Stal BiS Kutno (22)
- Website: http://www.baseballsoftball.pl/ (Polish)

The Ekstraliga Baseball is the top-level baseball league in Poland. The league is regulated by the Polish Baseball and Softball Federation (PZBiS). Like most European sports leagues, the Ekstraliga uses a system of promotion and relegation. As of 2020, the Ekstraliga consists of six teams, with each team playing four games against each other team.

== 2024 Teams ==
- Barons Wrocław
- Centaury Warszawa
- Gepardy Żory
- Stal BiS Kutno
- Silesia Rybnik

== Champions ==
- 1985 : KS Silesia Rybnik
- 1986 : KS Silesia Rybnik
- 1987 : KS Silesia Rybnik
- 1988 : MKS Stal BiS Kutno
- 1989 : MKS Stal BiS Kutno
- 1990 : RKS Skra Warsaw
- 1991 : MKS Stal BiS Kutno
- 1992 : MKS Stal BiS Kutno
- 1993 : RKS Skra Warsaw
- 1994 : RKS Skra Warsaw
- 1995 : MKS Stal BiS Kutno
- 1996 : MKS Stal BiS Kutno
- 1997 : MKS Stal BiS Kutno
- 1998 : BK Jastrzębie
- 1999 : BK Jastrzębie
- 2000 : BK Jastrzębie
- 2001 : BK Jastrzębie
- 2002 : MKS Stal BiS Kutno
- 2003 : MKS Stal BiS Kutno
- 2004 : KS Dęby Osielsko
- 2005 : MKS Stal BiS Kutno

- 2006 : MKS Stal BiS Kutno
- 2007 : MKS Stal BiS Kutno
- 2008 : MKS Stal BiS Kutno
- 2009 : TSB Demony Miejska Górka
- 2010 : MKS Stal BiS Kutno
- 2011 : MKS Stal BiS Kutno
- 2012 : BUKS Gepardy Żory
- 2013 : WUKB Centaury Warsaw
- 2014 : MKS Stal BiS Kutno
- 2015 : MKS Stal BiS Kutno
- 2016 : WUKB Centaury Warsaw
- 2017 : KS Silesia Rybnik
- 2018 : KS Silesia Rybnik
- 2019 : MKS Stal BiS Kutno
- 2020 : Barons Wrocław
- 2021 : MKS Stal BiS Kutno
- 2022 : MKS Stal BiS Kutno
- 2023 : MKS Stal BiS Kutno
- 2024 : MKS Stal BiS Kutno
- 2025 : KS Silesia Rybnik
- 2026 : Barons Wrocław
