= 2025 European Under-23 Baseball Championship =

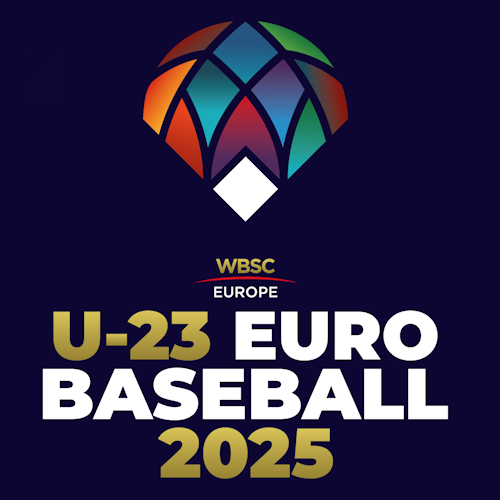

Tournament details
- Country: Czech Republic
- Cities: Třebíč, Brno
- Dates: 5-9 August
- Teams: 8
- Defending champions: Netherlands

Final positions
- Champions: Great Britain (1st title)
- Runners-up: Czech Republic
- Third place: Netherlands
- Fourth place: Italy

Tournament statistics
- Games played: 20
- Attendance: 7,505 (375 per game)
- All statistics correct as of 14 September 2025.

The 2025 European Men's U23 Baseball Championship was an international baseball tournament organized by WBSC Europe. It was held in the Czech Republic, with games being played in the cities of Třebíč and Brno, from August 5th to the 9th. It was held in the Czech Republic for the first time in six years.

Great Britain won its first title as well as its first international gold medal since the 1938 Amateur World Series.

== Opening round ==
=== Group A ===
Pos	Team	Pld	W	L	RF	RA	RD	PCT	GB	Qualification
1	Netherlands	3	3	0	31	17	+14	1.000	—	Advance to Semifinals
2	Italy	3	1	2	18	20	−2	.333	2	Advance to Semifinals
3	Austria	3	1	2	10	17	−7	.333	2	Advance to Classification round
4	Germany	3	1	2	10	15	−5	.333	2	Advance to Classification round

Source: WBSC

August 5, 2025; 14:30	Austria	3-10	Netherlands	Hroši, Brno-Komín; Attendance: 100; Umpires: Vladimir Richter (HP), Brandon Percle (1B), Tomislav Ozimec (3B)
August 5, 2025; 14:30	LP: Eoghan McGarry (0–1)	Boxscore	WP: Tijn Fredrikze (1–0)	Hroši, Brno-Komín; Attendance: 100; Umpires: Vladimir Richter (HP), Brandon Percle (1B), Tomislav Ozimec (3B)
August 5, 2025; 14:30		Boxscore	HR: Gedionne Marlin (1), Raphael Smeenk (1)	Hroši, Brno-Komín; Attendance: 100; Umpires: Vladimir Richter (HP), Brandon Percle (1B), Tomislav Ozimec (3B)

August 5, 2025; 14:30	Italy	3-4	Germany	Na Hvězdě, Třebíč; Attendance: 125; Umpires: Tomas Spilauer (HP), Jeronimo Moreno (1B), Matas Linkevicius (3B)
August 5, 2025; 14:30	LP: Marco Artitzu (0–1)	Boxscore	WP: Moritz van Bergen (1–0)	Na Hvězdě, Třebíč; Attendance: 125; Umpires: Tomas Spilauer (HP), Jeronimo Moreno (1B), Matas Linkevicius (3B)
August 5, 2025; 14:30	HR: Jhorjan Guevara Ducato (1)	Boxscore		Na Hvězdě, Třebíč; Attendance: 125; Umpires: Tomas Spilauer (HP), Jeronimo Moreno (1B), Matas Linkevicius (3B)

August 6, 2025; 14:30	Austria	7-2	Germany	Hroši, Brno-Komín; Attendance: 145; Umpires: Richard Wessel (HP), Franck Benasseur (1B), Matas Linkevicius (3B)
August 6, 2025; 14:30	WP: Paul Kerle (1-0)	Boxscore	LP: Finn Freisberg (0-1)	Hroši, Brno-Komín; Attendance: 145; Umpires: Richard Wessel (HP), Franck Benasseur (1B), Matas Linkevicius (3B)

August 6, 2025; 15:00	Netherlands	16-10	Italy	Na Hvězdě, Třebíč; Attendance: 468; Umpires: Jeronimo Moreno (HP), Vladimir Richter (1B), Tomas Spilauer (3B)
August 6, 2025; 15:00	WP: Jelle van der Lelie (1-0)	Boxscore	LP: Bruno Giacalone (0-1)	Na Hvězdě, Třebíč; Attendance: 468; Umpires: Jeronimo Moreno (HP), Vladimir Richter (1B), Tomas Spilauer (3B)

August 7, 2025; 14:30	Italy	5-0	Austria	Hroši, Brno-Komín; Attendance: 100; Umpires: Jeronimo Moreno (HP), Tomas Spilauer (1B), Franck Benasseur (3B)
August 7, 2025; 14:30	WP: Juan Carlos Infante (1-0)	Boxscore	LP: Alexander Kienberger (0-1)	Hroši, Brno-Komín; Attendance: 100; Umpires: Jeronimo Moreno (HP), Tomas Spilauer (1B), Franck Benasseur (3B)

August 7, 2025; 14:30	Germany	4-5	Netherlands	Na Hvězdě, Třebíč; Attendance: 175; Umpires: Georg Veit (HP), Tomislav Ozimec (1B), Vladimir Richter (3B)
August 7, 2025; 14:30		Boxscore		Na Hvězdě, Třebíč; Attendance: 175; Umpires: Georg Veit (HP), Tomislav Ozimec (1B), Vladimir Richter (3B)
August 7, 2025; 14:30	HR: Tristan Russell (1), Tobias Maul (1)	Boxscore	HR: Raphael Smeenk (2)	Na Hvězdě, Třebíč; Attendance: 175; Umpires: Georg Veit (HP), Tomislav Ozimec (1B), Vladimir Richter (3B)

=== Group B ===
Pos	Team	Pld	W	L	RF	RA	RD	PCT	GB	Qualification
1	Czech Republic (H)	3	3	0	20	5	+15	1.000	—	Advance to Semifinals
2	Great Britain	3	2	1	11	6	+5	.667	1	Advance to Semifinals
3	France	3	1	2	14	16	−2	.333	2	Advance to Classification round
4	Israel	3	0	3	5	23	−18	.000	3	Advance to Classification round

Source: WBSC
(H) Hosts

August 5, 2025; 10:00	Israel	0-7	Great Britain	Na Hvězdě, Třebíč; Attendance: 205; Umpires: Franck Benasseur (HP), Georg Veit (1B), Richard Wessel (3B)
August 5, 2025; 10:00	LP: Ita Spinoza (0–1)	Boxscore	WP: Zachary Colletti (1–0)	Na Hvězdě, Třebíč; Attendance: 205; Umpires: Franck Benasseur (HP), Georg Veit (1B), Richard Wessel (3B)

August 6, 2025; 10:00	Israel	5-6 (F/8)	France	Na Hvězdě, Třebíč; Attendance: 200; Umpires: Brandon Percle (HP), Tomas Spilauer (1B), Vladimir Richter (3B)
August 6, 2025; 10:00	LP: Nadav Machlin (0–1)	Boxscore	WP: Tanguy Meurant (1–0)	Na Hvězdě, Třebíč; Attendance: 200; Umpires: Brandon Percle (HP), Tomas Spilauer (1B), Vladimir Richter (3B)

August 6, 2025; 13:00	Czech Republic	7-5	France	Na Hvězdě, Třebíč; Attendance: 451; Umpires: Alberto Galazzetti Muscinelli (HP), Georg Veit (1B), Tomislav Ozimec (3B)
August 6, 2025; 13:00	WP: Vojtěch Ventruba (1–0)	Boxscore	LP: Mathis Nayral (0-1)	Na Hvězdě, Třebíč; Attendance: 451; Umpires: Alberto Galazzetti Muscinelli (HP), Georg Veit (1B), Tomislav Ozimec (3B)
August 6, 2025; 13:00	HR: Jan Pospíšil (1)	Boxscore		Na Hvězdě, Třebíč; Attendance: 451; Umpires: Alberto Galazzetti Muscinelli (HP), Georg Veit (1B), Tomislav Ozimec (3B)

August 6, 2025; 19:30	Great Britain	0-3	Czech Republic	Na Hvězdě, Třebíč; Attendance: 1000; Umpires: Tomislav Ozimec (HP), Georg Veit (1B), Brandon Percle (3B)
August 6, 2025; 19:30	LP: Oliver Duthie (0-1)	Boxscore	WP: Jan Kozel (1–0)	Na Hvězdě, Třebíč; Attendance: 1000; Umpires: Tomislav Ozimec (HP), Georg Veit (1B), Brandon Percle (3B)

August 7, 2025; 10:00	France	3-4	Great Britain	Na Hvězdě, Třebíč; Attendance: 105; Umpires: Richard Wessel (HP), Matas Linkevicius (1B), Alberto Galazzetti Muscinelli (3B)
August 7, 2025; 10:00	LP: Thibault Mercadier (0-1)	Boxscore	WP: Zac Sohosky (1–0); Sv: John Morin (1)	Na Hvězdě, Třebíč; Attendance: 105; Umpires: Richard Wessel (HP), Matas Linkevicius (1B), Alberto Galazzetti Muscinelli (3B)

August 7, 2025; 19:30	Czech Republic	10-0 (F/5)	Israel	Na Hvězdě, Třebíč; Attendance: 950; Umpires: Brandon Percle (HP), Alberto Galazzetti Muscinelli (1B), Matas Linkevicius (3B)
August 7, 2025; 19:30	WP: Tadeáš Zavadil (1-0)	Boxscore	LP: Ivri Margolin (0-1)	Na Hvězdě, Třebíč; Attendance: 950; Umpires: Brandon Percle (HP), Alberto Galazzetti Muscinelli (1B), Matas Linkevicius (3B)
August 7, 2025; 19:30	HR: Michal Šindelka (1)	Boxscore		Na Hvězdě, Třebíč; Attendance: 950; Umpires: Brandon Percle (HP), Alberto Galazzetti Muscinelli (1B), Matas Linkevicius (3B)

== Classification round ==
5–8th places
8 August, 10:00
Israel	2
Austria	5
8 August, 14:30
Germany	6
France	9

5th place
9 August, 10:00
Austria	4
France	7
7th place
9 August, 14:30
Germany	8
Israel	2

== Playoffs ==
=== Semifinals ===
August 8, 2025; 14:30	Great Britain	7-4	Netherlands	Na Hvězdě, Třebíč; Attendance: 165; Umpires: Alberto Galazzetti Muscinelli (HP), Matas Linkevicius (1B), Brandon Percle (3B)
August 8, 2025; 14:30	WP: Andrew Campbell (1-0); Sv: Zachary Colletti (1)	Boxscore	LP: Justin Morales (0-1)	Na Hvězdě, Třebíč; Attendance: 165; Umpires: Alberto Galazzetti Muscinelli (HP), Matas Linkevicius (1B), Brandon Percle (3B)

August 8, 2025; 14:30	Italy	0-3	Czech Republic	Na Hvězdě, Třebíč; Attendance: 1198; Umpires: Tomislav Ozimec (HP), Georg Veit (1B), Franck Benasseur (3B)
August 8, 2025; 14:30	LP: Omar Benelli (0-1)	Boxscore	WP: Ondřej Vank (1-0)	Na Hvězdě, Třebíč; Attendance: 1198; Umpires: Tomislav Ozimec (HP), Georg Veit (1B), Franck Benasseur (3B)

=== Bronze ===
August 9, 2025; 14:30	Netherlands	9-4	Italy	Na Hvězdě, Třebíč; Umpires: Tomas Spilauer (HP), Jeronimo Moreno (1B), Matas Linkevicius (3B)

Team	1	2	3	4	5	6	7	R	H	E
(Netherlands) NED	1	1	0	0	1	6	0	9	15	2
(Italy) ITA	0	0	0	2	1	0	1	4	6	1
WP: Nkosi Didder (1-0) LP: Mattia Bernadis (0-1); Home runs: NED: Raphael Smeenk (3); ITA: Alex Giovanardi (1); Attendance: 155; Boxscore

=== Gold ===
August 9, 2025; 19:30	Czech Republic	7-9	Great Britain	Na Hvězdě, Třebíč; Umpires: Georg Veit (HP), Brandon Percle (1B), Tomislav Ozimec (2B), Richard Wessel (3B)

Team	1	2	3	4	5	6	7	R	H	E
(Czech Republic) CZE	3	3	1	0	0	0	0	7	13	1
(United Kingdom) GBR	0	0	5	0	0	4	X	9	11	0
WP: Zachary Colletti (2-0) LP: Matyáš Trčka (0-1); Home runs: CZE: None; GBR: Jackson Wallis (1); Attendance: 1515; Boxscore

== Final Rankings ==
Rk	Team
1st place, gold medalist(s)	Great Britain
2nd place, silver medalist(s)	Czech Republic
3rd place, bronze medalist(s)	Netherlands
4	Italy
5	France
6	Austria
7	Germany
8	Israel

Qualified for the 2026 U-23 World Cup
