= Latvian Baseball League =

- Current season, competition or edition: 2026 Latvian Baseball League season
- Sport: Baseball
- Founded: 2003; 23 years ago
- No. of teams: 4
- Country: Latvia
- Continent: Europe
- Most recent champion: Sigulda
- Most titles: Riga Lions (6)
- Website: https://www.beisbolasavieniba.lv/liga

The Latvian Baseball League (LBL) is the men's amateur league in Latvia. It started play in 2003 and continues to this day. The season runs from May to October and games are played on the weekends.

== Latvian Champions ==
Year	Team
2003	Sigulda YMCA
2004	BK Riga
2005	BK Riga
2006	BK Riga
2007	Riga Diamonds
2008	Riga Lions
2009	Riga Diamonds / University of Latvia
2010	Riga Lions
2011	Riga Lions
2012	Riga Lions
2013	Riga Lions
2014	Riga Lions
2023	Riga Archers
2024	Riga Archers
2025	Sigulda BC
