= Polish Baseball and Softball Federation =

Governing body of baseball and softball in Poland

The Polish Baseball and Softball Federation (Polski Związek Baseballu i Softballu), is the governing body of baseball and softball in Poland. It is a member of the International Baseball Federation. The federation was established in 1978, based on the Polish Association of Palant (a Polish bat-and-ball game). The federation is in charge of the Ekstraliga Baseball and the I Liga, the top- and second-level baseball leagues in Poland. It also organizes a top-level softball league and the Polish national teams for baseball, Baseball5, and softball.

There is no clear information when baseball was first introduced in Poland, but it used to be said that in 50s- 60s mostly in Silesia Region thanks to the contacts with Czechoslovak players, but then it was developed in 80s also in other regions of Poland and the official league started in 1984.
