= Interlyga =

Baseball league in the Baltic states

- Sport: Baseball
- Founded: 2003
- No. of teams: 4
- Country: Estonia; Lithuania
- Most recent champion: Kaunas ABK (2020)
- Website: http://www.beisbolas.lt/turnyras.php?mid=3&id=2

The Interlyga is an independent baseball league based in the Baltic states. Previously clubs from Belarus, Finland, Latvia and Russia were also competing in the Interlyga.

== 2020 ==
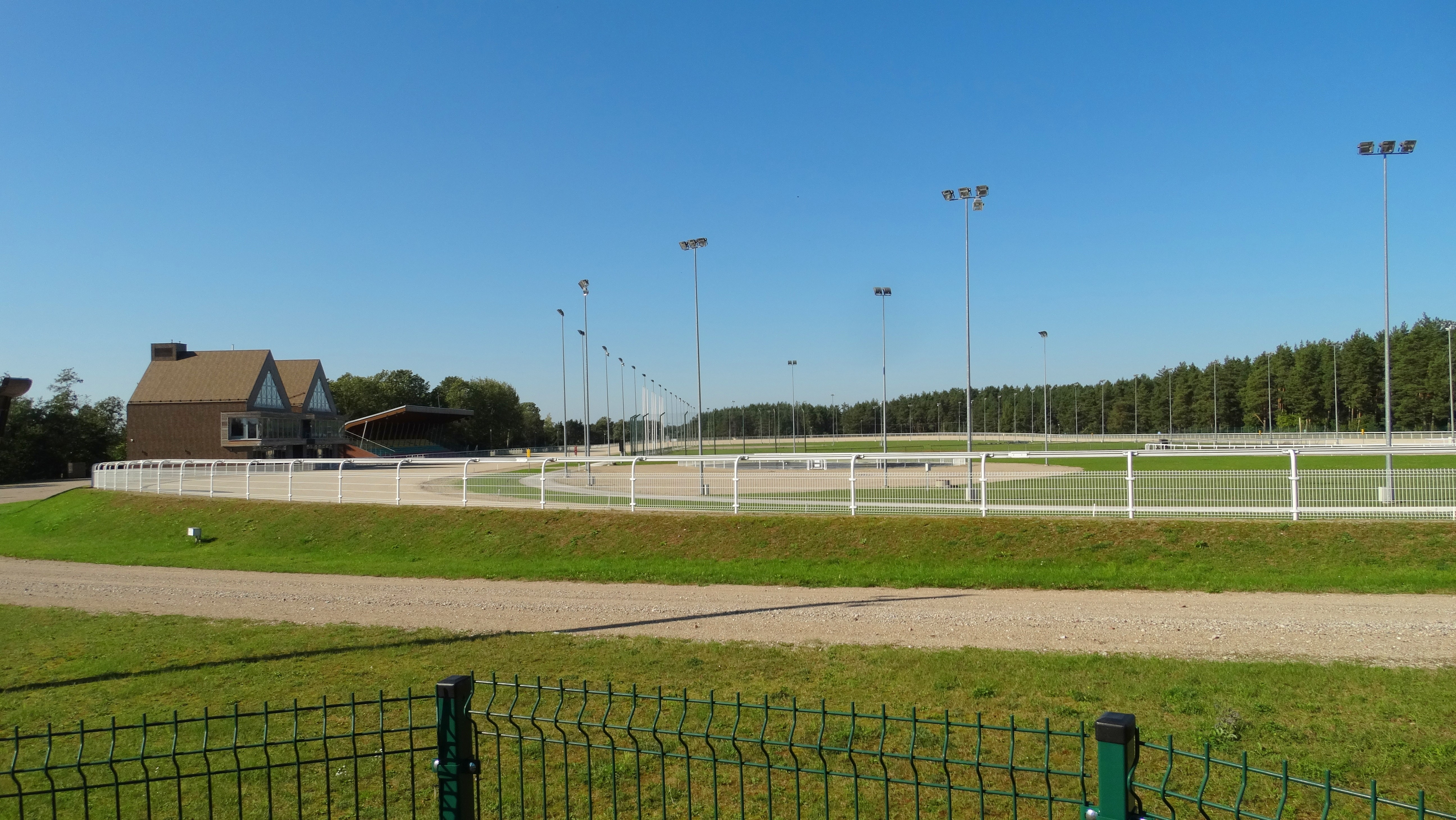
Utena Hippodrome hosted the 2020 finals

The 2020 Interlyga had been planned firstly to be competed between teams from Estonia, Lithuania and Russia, and later as 4 team competition between 2 teams from Lithuania - BK Vilnius and Kaunas ABK, Estonian champions Kiili Panthers and Latvian champions. However, Latvian team was replaced by BK Titanai Utena before the season started. The competition consisted of two rounds, first played in Tallinn, Estonia, and second in Utena Hippodrome, Utena, Lithuania, which also later hosted the finals. The Estonian team had to skip the final due to a COVID-19 outbreak in the squad.

Kaunas ABK beat BK Vilnius 4–1 in the Grand Final, with home run by Will Gordon being the decider. Titanai won over replacements Titanai-2 16:3 in the match for bronze medals.

Place	Team	Record
Gold	Kaunas ABK	6–2
Silver	BK Vilnius	5–3
Bronze	BK Titanai Utena	3–5
4	Kiili Panthers	2–4
NR	BK Titanai-2 Utena	0–2

== 2014 ==
BK Vilnius were the champions of the 2014 Interlyga.

=== Divisions ===
Northern group:

- BK Riga (LAT)
- Kiili Panthers (EST)
- North Stars St. Petersburg (RUS)

Central (Lithuania) group:

- Kaunas Lituanica
- Vilnius Juodasis Vikingas - Sporto Vilkai
- Utena Vėtra
- BK Vilnius

Southern (Belarus) group:

- BC Minsk
- Zubry Brest
- Sugar Storm Skidel
