= Moldova national baseball team =

Information
- Country: Moldova
- Federation: National Baseball and Softball Sports Federation
- Confederation: Confederation of European Baseball

WBSC ranking
- Current: NR (31 December 2025)

The Moldova national baseball team is the national baseball team of Moldova. The team represents Moldova in international competitions. Baseball is still a relatively unknown sport in Moldova. Many of the Moldovan baseball players are from Danish communities in Canada and the United States.
