= San Marino national baseball team =

Information
- Country: San Marino
- Federation: Federazione Sammarinese Baseball-Softball
- Confederation: WBSC Europe

WBSC ranking
- Current: NR (26 October 2026)

European Championship
- Appearances: 2 (first in 1971)
- Best result: 5th (1971)

The San Marino national baseball team is the national baseball team of San Marino. The team has competed in twice in the European Baseball Championship. The team has not earned points in the WBSC World Rankings since at least 2012.

The team is organized by the Federazione Sammarinese Baseball-Softball and is part of WBSC Europe. Baseball was introduced to the country in the 1960s, in part by Luciano Capicchioni, an English teacher, who also promoted basketball. The sport is also modestly popular in surrounding Italy, and San Marino has a team, San Marino Baseball Club, in Italy's top league, Series A.

San Marino had 196 baseball players in 2006, according to the Confederation of European Baseball, the predecessor of WBSC Europe.

== Results ==
European Baseball Championship

- 1971: 5th (2–2)
- 1985: 6th (0–8)
