= Poland national baseball team =

Information
- Country: Poland
- Federation: Polish Baseball and Softball Federation
- Confederation: WBSC Europe
- Manager: John McLaren

WBSC ranking
- Current: 54 (26 March 2026)

The Poland national baseball team represents Poland in international competition and is governed by the Polish Baseball and Softball Federation, a member of WBSC Europe and the World Baseball Softball Confederation (WBSC). The team competes in European championship tournaments and World Baseball Classic (WBC) qualifying events and serves as Poland's primary representative in international baseball. As of the most recent WBSC world rankings, Poland is ranked 54th.

The national program includes age divisions at the U-18, U-23, and senior levels. In recent years, the senior team recorded a second-place finish at the 2024 European Qualifiers and a second-place finish at the 2025 Prague Baseball Week, while the U-18 national team captured first place in European qualifier competition. Since the appointment of new coaching staff in 2024, Poland's position in the World Baseball Softball Confederation rankings has improved from 72nd to 54th.

== History ==
The first baseball game was held in Poland in 1919, though a similar bat-and-ball game called palant was also played in the country. A national palant and baseball federation was formed in 1960. The national team's first match was held in 1983 against a club team from the Netherlands, Foresters Heiloo. Polish-American Stan Musial, a Baseball Hall of Famer, was named the honorary chairman of the Polish Baseball Federation in the 1980s and field was built in his honor in Kutno, Poland. A Little League youth program began in 1989, and Little League's Europe and Africa Region offices are in Kutno. The national team began competing in European Baseball Championship qualifiers in 1990, and a team from Kutno made the 2004 Little League World Series.

== Coaching staff ==
The Polish national baseball team's coaching and leadership structure combines professional baseball experience with organizational management aimed at developing the sport nationally and internationally.

- Manager: John McLaren – Former Major League Baseball (MLB) manager and longtime MLB coach.
- Assistant Coach: Dennis Cook – Former MLB pitcher and World Series champion.
- General Manager: Paul Bragiel – Investor and entrepreneur backing and supporting long-term program development.

In 2024, the Polish national baseball team strengthened its coaching structure by hiring former MLB manager John McLaren and former MLB pitcher and World Series champion Dennis Cook. Cook's hiring was part of a broader strategy to bring professional-level expertise to the program, drawing on his 15-year major keague career and extensive international coaching experience. Alongside Cook, investor and entrepreneur Paul Bragiel joined the team's leadership as a bench coach and special advisor, leveraging his business background and passion for baseball to support the federation's efforts to grow the sport in Poland and connect with players of Polish heritage.

Their first coaching experience together took place during the European Championship Qualifier held in Kutno, where they helped Poland advance to the final of the qualifier before ultimately losing to Lithuania.

== Current roster ==
Poland roster – 2026 Current Roster
Players		Coaches
Pitchers: P Adam Alexis; P Karol Dwojakowski; P Szymon Dwojakowski; P Dawid Korzekwa; P Tadeusz Romanowski; P Carlos Tómas Romo; P Joesph Pence; P Aleks Polonek; P Michael Sosna; P Martin Sosna; P Jakub Szymura	Catchers: C Dominik Grzecicha; C Dominik Olech; C Marceli Buchacz; C Patryk Weżgowiec; Infielders: IF Franciszek Dudek; IF Szymon Garus; IF Piotr Płudowski; IF Hubert Zgórzyński; IF Arthur Kowara; IF Hubert Szczeszka; Outfielders: OF Szymon Garus; OF Hubert Szczeszka; OF Dariusz Golebiowski; OF Filip Sarota; OF Adam Sarota; OF Wojciech Zagawa; OF Connor Bowie	Manager: M John McLaren; Coaches: CCH Dennis Cook; CCH Paul Bragiel; CCH Tim Holmes

== Tournament results ==
European Junior Baseball Championship

- 2007 : 10th

European Youth Baseball Championship

- 2006 : 7th
- 2007 : 8th

European Juveniles Baseball Championship

- 2006 : 4th
- 2007 : (silver) 2nd
- 2008 : (bronze) 3rd
- 2015 : 4th

European Championship Qualifiers

- 2007 : 3rd (Pool 1, Group A)
- 2009 : 3rd (Pool 2)
- 2011 : 4th (Pool Antwerp)
- 2013 : 4th (Pool Zurich)
- 2015 : 6th, relegated to Pool C (Pool Vienna)
- 2016 : 1st in Pool C (Miejska Górka Group),
- 2017: 3rd (tied) in Pool B (Miejska Górka Group)
- 2019 : 3rd in Pool B (Trnava, Slovakia)
- 2021 : 4th in Pool B (Utena, Lithuania)
- 2022: 5th in Pool B (Belgrade , Serbia)
- 2024 : 2nd (Group B)(Kutno, Poland)
- 2026 : 2nd (Group B) (Wrocław, Poland)

Prague Baseball Week

- 2025 : (silver) 2nd (Group B)

U-18 European Championship Qualifiers

- 2025 : (silver) 1st (Group B)

Date	Opponent	Score	Result	Tournament	Venue
2024 European Qualifiers
2024-07-24	Lithuania	3–8	L	2024 European Qualifiers	Stan Musial Stadium, Kutno, Poland
2024-07-25	Finland	7–4	W	2024 European Qualifiers	Stan Musial Stadium, Kutno, Poland
2024-07-26	Romania	0–0	W	2024 European Qualifiers	Stan Musial Stadium, Kutno, Poland
2024-07-27	Lithuania	9–10	L	Championship	Stan Musial Stadium, Kutno, Poland

Date	Opponent	Score	Result	Tournament	Venue
Prague Baseball Week (Group B)
2025-06-27	Slovakia	6–5	W	Prague Baseball Week	Prague, Czech Republic
2025-06-28	Lithuania	11–1	W	Prague Baseball Week	Prague, Czech Republic
2025-06-29	Switzerland	4–19	L	Prague Baseball Week	Prague, Czech Republic
2025-06-30	Switzerland	1–5	L	Championship	Prague, Czech Republic

Date	Opponent	Score	Result	Tournament	Venue
U-18 European Qualifiers – July 2025 Tournament
2025-07-07	Ukraine	4–3	W	European Qualifiers	Stan Musial Stadium
2025-07-09	Switzerland	10–5	W	European Qualifiers	Stan Musial Stadium
2025-07-11	Lithuania	14–0	W	European Qualifiers	Stan Musial Stadium
2025-07-12	Sweden	0-14	L	European Qualifiers	Stan Musial Stadium
2025-07-12	Sweden	4–2	W	Championship	Stan Musial Stadium
