= Finland national baseball team =

Information
- Country: Finland
- Federation: Finnish Baseball and Softball Federation
- Confederation: Confederation of European Baseball
- Manager: Tomio Pihkala

WBSC ranking
- Current: 79 ▲1 (26 March 2026)
- Highest: 52 (December 2017)
- Lowest: 73 (November 2023)

The Finland national baseball team is the national baseball team of Finland. The team competes in the bi-annual European Baseball Championship.

== Results ==
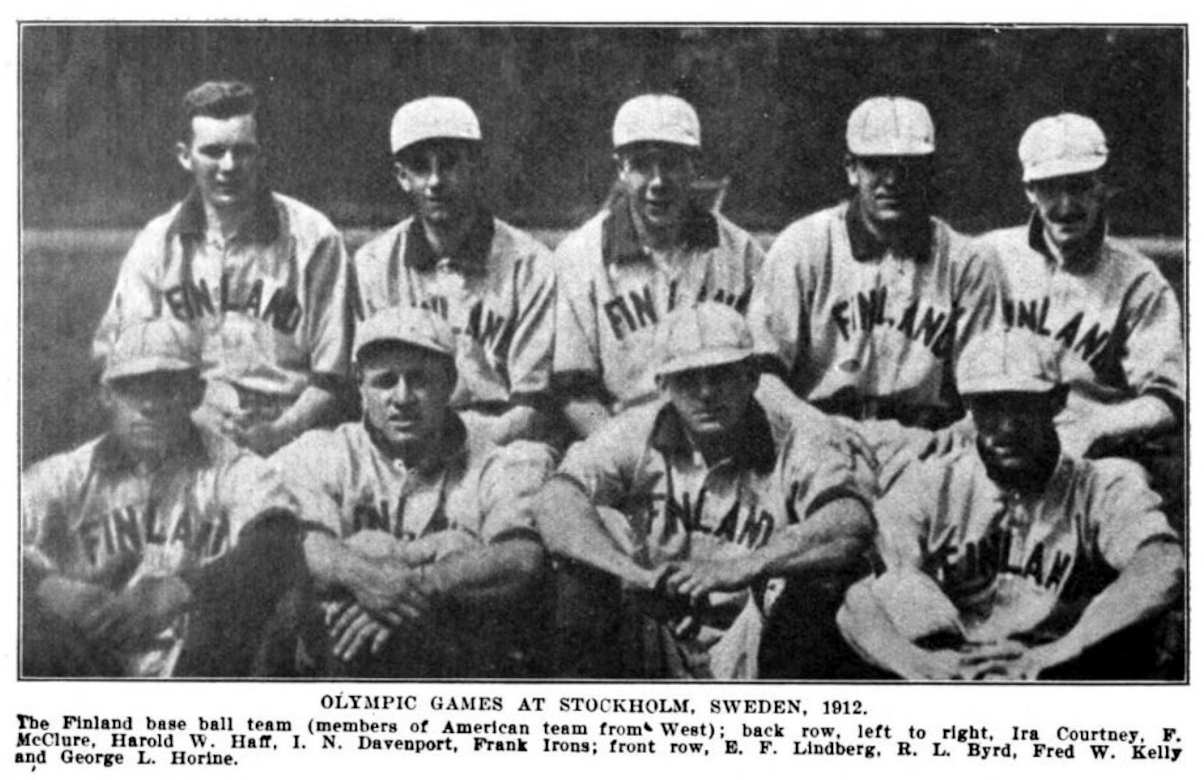
US "Finland" baseball team at the 1912 Summer Olympics

European Baseball Championship

2018 Pool C, Qualification for 2019 B-Pool: 2 Wins - 2 Loses

2019 European Baseball Championship – B-Pool: Switzerland - Finland 16 - 9; Finland - Poland 6 - 21; Ukraine - Finland 14 - 0; Belarus - Finland 14 - 4; Romania - Finland 14 - 20;

Nordic Championships - Baltic Open

1997 - Sölvesborg, Sweden - Finland - Sweden 0 - 5; Denmark - Finland 15 - 0; Norway - Finland 14 - 15;

2000, June 23–25 - Oslo, Norway - Norway - Finland 8 - 1; Finland - Denmark 14 - 4; Sweden - Finland 15 - 5;

2001, June 2–4 - Skövde, Sweden - Norway - Finland 7 - 12; Finland - Sweden 6 - 16; Denmark - Finland 12 - 24;

2003, May - Oslo, Norway - Finland - Norway 5 - 1; Sweden - Finland 11 - 7; Norway - Finland 12 - 11; Finland - Sweden 15 - 16;

2004, May 28–30 - Skövde, Sweden - Finland - Sweden 18 - 2; Norway - Finland 16 - 7; Sweden - Finland 6 - 7; Finland - Norway 14 - 8;

2005, May 14–15, Karlskoga, Sweden - Finland - Sweden 18 - 8; Norway - Finland 12 - 7; Finland - Norway 11 - 4; Sweden - Finland 13 - 19;

2006, May 25–27 - Karlskoga, Sweden - Sweden - Finland 12 - 18; Finland - Norway 8 - 7; Finland - Sweden 0 - 18; Norway - Finland 5 - 3;

2007, May 18–20 - Karlskoga, Sweden - Sweden - Finland 7 - 16; Finland - Norway 20 - 2; Finland - Sweden 11 - 5; Norway - Finland 7 - 13;

Baltic Open 2008, May 22–25 - Stockholm, Sweden - Finland - Estonia 14 - 10; Sweden - Finland 22 - 1; Finland - Latvia 23 - 4; Sweden - Finland 15 - 7;
