= Georgia national baseball team =

Information
- Country: Georgia
- Federation: Georgian Baseball and Softball National Federation
- Confederation: WBSC Europe

WBSC ranking
- Current: NR (26 March 2026)

The Georgia national baseball team is the national baseball team of Georgia. The team competes in the bi-annual European Baseball Championship.
