= Slovenia national baseball team =

Slovenian national baseball team
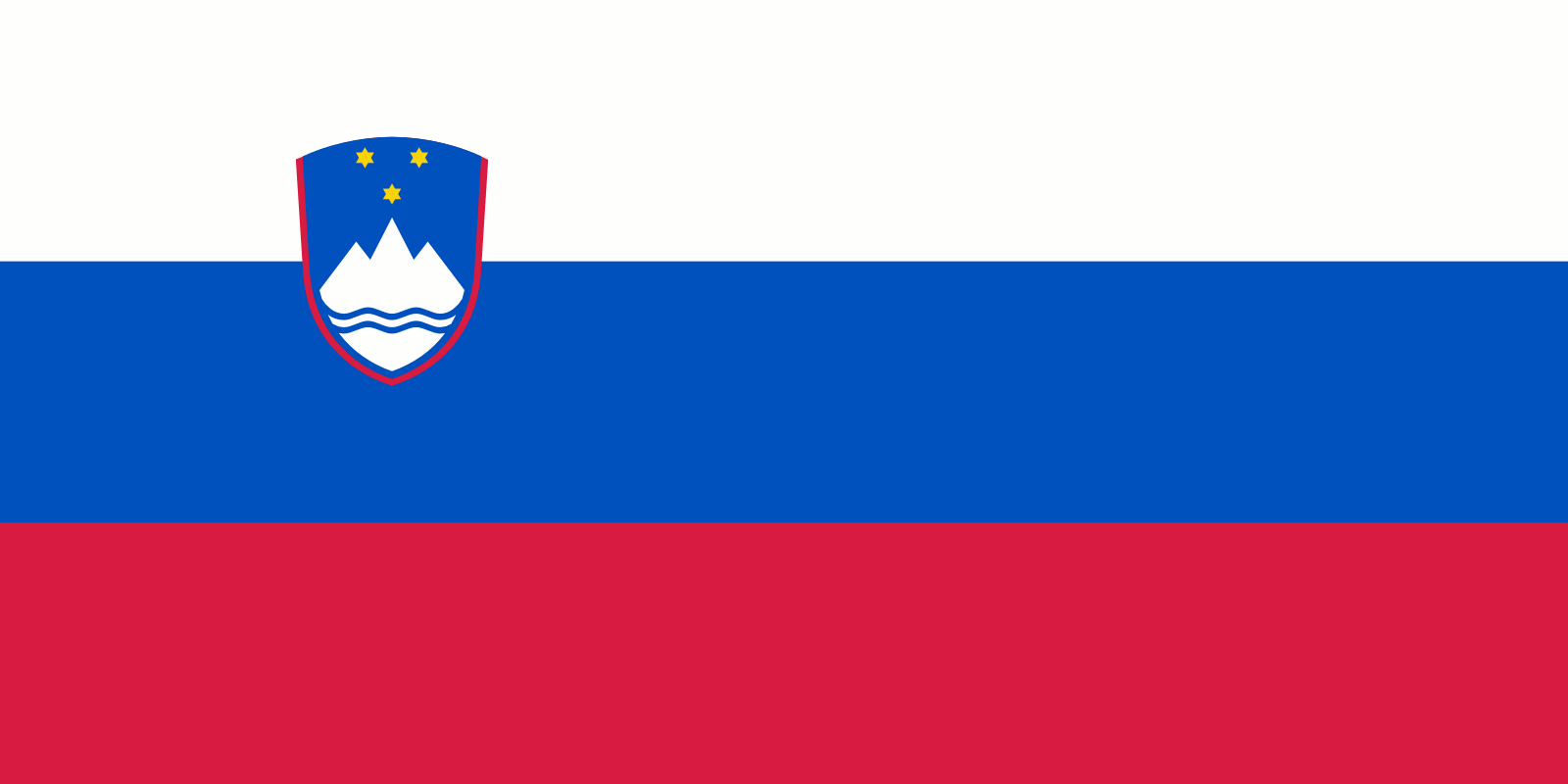

Information
- Country: Slovenia
- Federation: Slovenian Baseball and Softball Association
- Confederation: WBSC Europe
- Manager: Ronald Anthony Krsolovic

WBSC ranking
- Current: 68 (26 October 2026)

The Slovenia national baseball team is the national baseball team of Slovenia. The team competes in the bi-annual European Baseball Championship. The President of the Slovenia Baseball Association is Marko Mrdjenovič. The president represents Slovenia for both the Confederation of European Baseball and the World Baseball Softball Association.

== Roster ==
Slovenia's roster for the European Baseball Championship Qualifier 2022, the last official competition in which the team took part.

Slovenia national baseball team – European Baseball Championship Qualifier 2022 roster
Players		Coaches
Pitchers: 55 Rok Čuček; 38 Tevž Gantar; 7 Žiga Lešnjak; 5 Žan Primožič; 25 Jan Pučnik; 29 Jaka Smolnikar	Catchers: 15 Igor Drobnak; 23 Matic Lešnjak; Infielders: 55 Rok Čuček; 15 Igor Drobnak; 23 Matic Lešnjak; 5 Žan Primožič; 51 Luka Pučnik; 10 Carlos Henrique Tovar; Outfielders: 37 Luka Koplan; 46 Maj Prihoda; 51 Luka Pučnik; 4 Rok Škerjanec; 67 Jakob Tevž; 72 Rok Zupan	Manager: 23 Matic Lešnjak; Coaches: 15 Igor Drobnak; 25 Jan Pučnik; 51 Luka Pučnik
