= Baseball in the Netherlands =

Baseball in the Netherlands started in 1911, having been introduced to the country by teacher J.C.G Grasé of Amsterdam, following a holiday to America. The first professional baseball league, now the Honkbal Hoofdklasse, began in 1922. The national governing body for baseball is the Royal Netherlands Baseball and Softball Federation (Dutch: Koninklijke Nederlandse Baseball en Softball Bond).

The Netherlands national men's baseball team consistently ranks in the top ten of the WBSC World Rankings and has won the European Baseball Championship 25 times. Although baseball is a minority sport within the Netherlands proper, it is the main sport of the Dutch overseas territories in the Caribbean (formerly the Netherlands Antilles).

== History ==
=== 1911–1940 ===
The driving force in the early days of Dutch baseball was J.C.G. Grasé of Amsterdam. After discovering baseball while on vacation in the United States, he introduced the game in the Netherlands in 1911. An English teacher by profession, Grasé was able to translate the rules of the game into Dutch. He translated the sport's name to Dutch: honkbal rather than use the English name for the sport. The first official games were played in 1911 and on March 12, 1912, Grasé founded the Dutch Baseball Union. Grasé was also the founder of the oldest baseball club in Europe, Quick Amsterdam (founded 1 March 1913).

The first official competition was played in 1922. The major league was formed out of four clubs that year: Ajax (a branch of the famous football club), Blue White (also a football club), Hercules, and Quick, which became the first Dutch champion During the early years, baseball was only played in Amsterdam but quickly spread to Haarlem as well. These two cities dominated Dutch baseball until 1963.

The Dutch began competing against teams formed from visiting U.S. military personnel in 1923. In 1925, a ship of the US Navy visited Amsterdam. Players on Blue White heard of the visit and invited the sailors to a game of baseball. After one inning, the Americans led 14–0. After two hours, the final score was 27–2.

In the early days, the pitcher was the one who could throw the fastest ball. At the time, it was considered unsportsmanlike to bunt or to take advantage of the lack of control by a pitcher and it was considered a humiliation to get a base on balls. It was far better to hit a fly out than to reach first base on four balls. Furthermore, the sport was played wearing shorts.

At the end of the 1937 season, EDO from Haarlem and Blue White from Amsterdam played each other to determine the Dutch champion. The game was played with a two-hour time limit. The coach of EDO thought that he had won the game after the final out of an inning, but according to the umpire, there were three more minutes to be played, so a new inning began. The players of EDO were furious and Blue White ended up winning and became Dutch champion. This was the final instance of a two-hour time limit, and beginning in 1938, games in the major league lasted nine innings.

In 1939, a team of Mormon missionaries from Salt Lake City played in the Dutch league under the name Seagulls. They only lost two games (vs. Blue White from Amsterdam 7–1, and vs. HHC from Haarlem 6–2).

Champions 1922–1939
1923	Blue White Amsterdam
1924	Ajax Amsterdam
1925	Quick Amsterdam
1926	A.G.H.C. Amsterdam
1928	Ajax
1929	S.C. Haarlem
1930	S.C. Haarlem
1931	Blue White
1932	Blue White
1933	V.V.G.A. Amsterdam
1934	S.C. Haarlem
1935	Quick
1936	H.H.C. Haarlem
1937	Quick
1938	Quick
1939	Seagulls Amsterdam

=== 1940–1970 ===
Netherlands vs Belgium, Haarlem (1950)

After the German invasion in May 1940, baseball went through a difficult period. As the war continued, baseball materials became scarce. Starting in 1943, baseballs were made of rubber-like substance with a cork center. The balls, which were made by the tire company Vredenstein, could absorb little more than a couple of hits, before breaking apart. Some pitchers would cut out a small piece in order to throw a curveball, because the balls didn't have seams. Clubs were forced to mend cracked bats with screws or whatever other materials were handy.

After World War II, the Americans helped Europe rebuild with the Marshall Plan. They also sent baseball materials to the Netherlands including uniforms, bats, balls, etc. Teams like OVVO from Amsterdam and HHC from Haarlem played in red uniforms.

Many games were played against military teams. In their own league, the Dutch could hold their own, but not against the better skilled Americans. Han Urbanus, was the best Dutch pitcher in these days. Getting a hit against him guaranteed a starting spot in the Dutch national team. A Dutch American journalist, Albert Balink, managed two trips to spring training camp for Urbanus. The journalist knew that the Dutchman would need a lot more experience to improve. Martin Jole, one of the players who could hit Urbanus, went to a spring training camp with the Cincinnati Reds. He showed Dutch players how swinging a bat day after day could improve their hitting.

Balink also introduced medals for the best players and hitters, which allowed him to show that baseball is a sport of stats. In 1953, Urbanus got a phone call from the USA. The New York Giants had offered him a minor league contract. He refused, due to the fact that he preferred to teach his fellow countrymen what he had learned in the USA.

From 1949 to 1953, Dutch baseball was dominated by OVVO from Amsterdam, which claimed five consecutive national titles. In 1955, the club won it for the last time.

The post-war help of the Americans helped the Dutch earn their first European title in 1956 in Rome, Italy. Urbanus was a defensive force, and the Dutch batters performed very well. Because of the European title, the Dutch were allowed to go to the Global World Series held in Milwaukee that year; they returned to the tournament as the European representatives in 1957. American coaches like Ron Fraser and Bill Arce helped the Dutch to improve their game. The number of baseball fields built around the country increased dramatically.

In 1963, a real baseball stadium was built in Haarlem. This stadium would be the base of the Haarlem Baseball Week, a yearly event.

Prior to 1963, baseball was dominated by teams from Amsterdam and Haarlem. But in 1963, Sparta from Rotterdam became the Dutch champion. From 1963 to 1974, Sparta clinched nine national titles, a record not exceeded until 1985 by the Haarlem Nicols. In the early sixties, each team played 14 games; one game every weekend.

Champions 1940–1969
1940	S.C. Haarlem
1941	S.C. Haarlem
1942	Ajax Amsterdam
1943	Blue White Amsterdam
1944	Blue White
1945	Blue White
1946	Blue White
1947	Schoten Haarlem
1948	Ajax
1949	OVVO Amsterdam
1950	OVVO
1951	OVVO
1952	OVVO
1953	OVVO
1954	E.H.S. Haarlem
1955	OVVO
1956	Schoten
1957	Schoten
1958	E.D.O. Haarlem
1959	E.H.S.
1960	Schoten/Charlie (Chuckles) Stark
1961	Schoten/Karoush Stark
1962	E.H.S.
1963	Sparta Rotterdam
1964	Sparta
1965	Haarlem Nicols
1966	Sparta
1967	Sparta
1968	Nicols
1969	Sparta

=== 1970–present ===
In 1970, a Dutch-born pitcher named Bert Blyleven made the Minnesota Twins roster. He had a very successful Major League career which lasted until 1992, and was elected to the Baseball Hall of Fame in 2010. He was, however, raised in California and never played in the Dutch league. The first Dutch Major League Baseball player who grew up and learned the game in the Netherlands was Win Remmerswaal, who pitched for the Boston Red Sox in 1979 and 1980.

Dutch baseball was dominated by Sparta from Rotterdam in the early 70s. The "magnificent three" from the Dutch Antilles were unstoppable: Hudson John, Simon Arrindell, and Hamilton Richardson, who all had a big influence on Sparta, but by 1974, the era was over.

At the end of the 1972 season, the football club Ajax decided to disband its baseball team.

At the end of the 1977 season, there was some turmoil at OVVO from Amsterdam. This baseball club was also a branch of a football club. The football club, an amateur side, decided to turn professional and begin paying players. The baseball branch did not agree, and big names, like Urbanus, decided to leave and founded a new club: Amstel Tijgers. Other players like Urbanus's son Charles Urbanus Jr.(pitcher/shortstop), Jan Hijzelendoorn (pitcher), Paul Smit (catcher), and Don Wedman decided to follow suit, along with almost the entire team. The Dutch Baseball Federation tried to mediate, but the players did not come back. The city of Amsterdam appointed a terrain in the western part of the city. The Amstel Tijgers thought that field would be too far away, but ultimately the new club built a baseball field there, which is now used by Quick Amsterdam.

In the meantime, OVVO would not be persuaded to take a step back to a lower division. The Amstel Tijgers started their first season in the overgangsklasse; a league one level lower than the hoofdklasse. With such strong players, the Tigers were quickly promoted to the top division in 1979. OVVO's 1978 season was a disaster and the team was relegated. The Amstel Tigers went on to become champions in 1979, 1980, and 1986.

In 1979, a Dutch pitcher made his MLB debut on the mound in Milwaukee. The Red Sox were trailing 4–1, as they called Remmerswaal. His debut was a good one, even though his team lost 5–3. After the game, journalists seemed fascinated that a Dutch player could have come so far in the game. Remmerswaal's MLB career only lasted two seasons, due to injuries. After the 1980 season, Remmerswaal had pitched in 22 games (3 victories and 1 loss). His short career among baseball's elite lasted 55 innings. After his major league career, Remmerswaal went to Italy and played on several teams for many years.

The 1980s and 1990s were bad decades for many baseball clubs. In 1986, Urbanus Jr. decided that it would be his last season. This was a huge blow for his club, the Amstel Tijgers, since he was a magnet for players, who considered it an honour to play with him. But an Amstel Tigers without him was not as attractive to new talent, and the club lost competitiveness. Eventually, the members voted for a merger with HCAW from Bussum, a club that was playing the lower league. The new club, HCAW Tigers, were promoted to the major league in 1989 and would go on to win the title in 1996 and 1998, albeit without any of the old Amstel Tijgers players. Haarlem Nicols were particularly dominant in the 1980s, with seven pennants over ten years, but declared bankruptcy in 1994, just five years after winning their last pennant.

In 1981, Neptunus Rotterdam won the pennant for the first time since the baseball team formed in 1942. Neptunus began to dominate the championship during the 1990s and 2000s, winning 11 pennants in total, including seven consecutively between 1999 and 2005.

Champions 1970–2017
Year	Club
1970	Haarlem Nicols
1971	Sparta Rotterdam
1972	Sparta Rotterdam
1973	Sparta Rotterdam
1974	Sparta Rotterdam
1975	Haarlem Nicols
1976	Haarlem Nicols
1977	Haarlem Nicols
1978	Kinheim Haarlem
1979	Amstel Tijgers
1980	Amstel Tijgers
1981	Neptunus Rotterdam
1982	Haarlem Nicols
1983	Haarlem Nicols
1984	Haarlem Nicols
1985	Haarlem Nicols
1986	Amstel Tijgers
1987	Amsterdam Pirates
1988	Haarlem Nicols
1989	Haarlem Nicols
1990	Amsterdam Pirates
1991	Neptunus
1992	ADO Den Haag
1993	Neptunus
1994	Kinheim
1995	Neptunus Rotterdam
1996	HCAW Bussum Tijgers
1997	Pioneers Hoofddorp
1998	HCAW
1999	Neptunus
2000	Neptunus
2001	Neptunus
2002	Neptunus
2003	Neptunus
2004	Neptunus
2005	Neptunus
2006	Kinheim
2007	Kinheim
2008	Amsterdam Pirates
2009	Neptunus
2010	Neptunus
2011	Amsterdam Pirates
2012	Kinheim
2013	Neptunus
2014	Neptunus
2015	Neptunus
2016	Neptunus
2017	Neptunus

== World Baseball Classic ==
=== 2006 ===
In 2006, the Netherlands finished third in Pool C behind Puerto Rico and Cuba. Shairon Martis threw a 7-inning no-hitter against Panama.

=== 2009 ===
In 2009, the Netherlands defeated the heavily favored Dominican Republic twice to qualify for the second round of the World Baseball Classic. The Dutch upset the Dominican team 3–2 in their first meeting and 2–1 in 11 innings in a qualification game.

=== 2013 ===
In 2013, the Netherlands finished second in Pool B with wins over South Korea and Australia. In the second round the Netherlands were placed in Pool 1. The Dutch beat Cuba twice while losing to Japan twice to finish as the second seed. In the semifinals, they fell to the Dominican Republic 4–1.

=== 2017 ===
The Netherlands again lost in the semifinals, this time to Puerto Rico. They reached there by going 2–1 both in the first and second rounds.

=== 2023 ===
The Netherlands did not advance past the first round, losing out in a five-way tiebreaker after finishing 2–2 in its pool.

== Baseball World Cup (IBAF) ==
=== 2009 ===
In 2009, for the first time in history, the Baseball World Cup was hosted by a continent rather than a single country. The Netherlands were one of 8 European countries to host the tournament. Together with Italy, they hosted the second round, which is the reason they received a bye through the first round. In the second round they faced the teams from Cuba, Puerto Rico, Venezuela, South Korea, Nicaragua, Spain and Great Britain. They went undefeated through the first six games, but lost the final game to Cuba, 3-5.

They went into the third round as the top seed, where they faced the teams from the United States, Canada, Australia and Chinese Taipei. In the first game, they defeated Chinese Taipei 11-2 but they lost their 3 remaining games.

Before the final round, every team was ranked based on their results of the second and third round. As a result, the Netherlands played Australia in their final game of the tournament where the fifth and sixth position was determined. They lost this game 1-4 and finished the tournament in sixth place with a record of 7 wins and 5 losses. Catcher Sidney de Jong was selected for the tournaments All Star Team.

=== 2011 ===
In 2011, in the 39th and final World Baseball cup, the Netherlands defeated the "baseball powerhouse" Cuba, and became world champion for the first time in history.

In the first round, they played the teams from Canada, Panama, the United states, Puerto Rico, Japan, Chinese Taipei and Greece. They only lost to Canada, 5–4 in extra innings, but they were able to win all of the other 6 games, including a 19-0 shutout over Greece. Tied for the first seed, they played South Korea, Australia, Cuba and Venezuela in the second round. They won all 4 games, including an outstanding performance against Venezuela, who they defeated 12–2 in 7 innings.

In the championship game, they played 25-time champion Cuba. Their manager, Brian Farley, led them to a 2-1 victory. Curt Smith scored for the Dutch team and received MVP honors, while Tom Stuifbergen was declared best pitcher of the tournament.

== See also ==
- Haarlem Baseball Week
- Holland Series
- World Port Tournament
- Baseball teams in the Netherlands
- Baseball awards#Netherlands
