= Miami Hurricanes =

University of Miami sports teams

- University: University of Miami
- Nickname: Hurricanes
- NCAA: Division I (FBS)
- Conference: Atlantic Coast Conference
- Athletic director: Dan Radakovich
- Location: Coral Gables, Florida
- Varsity teams: 16 (7 men's, 9 women's)
- Football stadium: Hard Rock Stadium
- Basketball arena: Watsco Center
- Baseball stadium: Alex Rodriguez Park at Mark Light Field
- Soccer stadium: Cobb Stadium
- Aquatics center: Norman Whitten Pool
- Tennis venue: Neil Schiff Tennis Center
- Colors: Orange, green, and white
- Mascot: Sebastian the Ibis
- Fight song: Hail to the Spirit of Miami U, Miami U How-Dee-Do
- Website: miamihurricanes.com

Team NCAA championships
- 5

Atlantic Coast Conference logo in Miami's colors

The Miami Hurricanes, known informally as The U, UM, or The 'Canes, are the intercollegiate sports teams that represent the University of Miami in Coral Gables, Florida. The Hurricanes compete in Division I of the National Collegiate Athletic Association, the highest level of collegiate athletics. The University of Miami's football team has won five national championships (in 1983, 1987, 1989, 1991, and 2001) and its baseball team has won four national championships (in 1982, 1985, 1999, and 2001). Across all sports, the Hurricanes have won 21 national championships and 83 individual national championships.

The Miami Hurricanes field 16 total teams, including 7 men's and 9 women's athletic teams. Men's teams include baseball, basketball, cross-country, diving, football, tennis, and track and field. Women's teams include: women's basketball, cross-country, golf, rowing, soccer, swimming and diving, tennis, track and field, and volleyball. The University of Miami has approximately equal participation by male and female varsity athletes in these sports.

The athletic department's colors are orange, green, and white. The school mascot is Sebastian the Ibis. The ibis was selected as the school's mascot because it is typically the last animal to flee an approaching hurricane and the first to reappear after the storm, making it a symbol of leadership and courage. The school's logo is the letter "U." Its marching band is the Band of the Hour.

Aside from being an independent in baseball, the Hurricanes were a full member of the Big East Conference from 1991 to 2004. In 2004, the Hurricanes left the Big East Conference to join the Atlantic Coast Conference (ACC).

Nearly 400 Miami Hurricanes football players have gone on to excel in the NFL, and eleven to date have been inducted into the Pro Football Hall of Fame: Jim Otto in 1980, Ted Hendricks in 1990, Jim Kelly in 2002, Michael Irvin in 2007, Cortez Kennedy in 2012, Warren Sapp in 2013, Ray Lewis in 2018, Ed Reed in 2019, Edgerrin James in 2020, and Devin Hester and Andre Johnson in 2024.

== Teams ==
Men's sports	Women's sports
Baseball	Basketball
Basketball	Cross country
Cross country	Golf
Diving	Rowing
Football	Soccer
Tennis	Swimming and diving
Track and field^{1}	Tennis
	Volleyball
^{1} – includes both indoor and outdoor.

=== Baseball ===
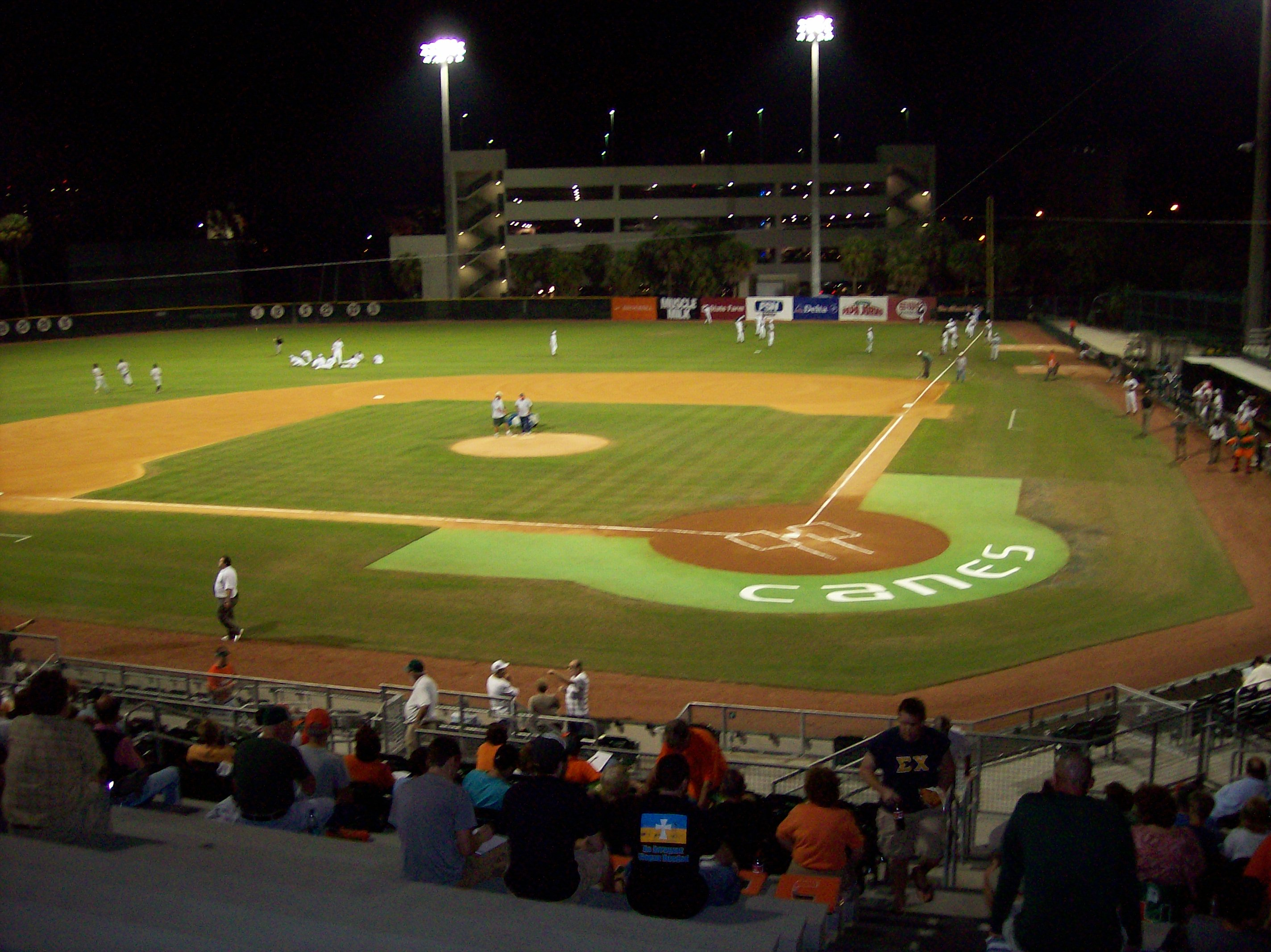
Alex Rodriguez Park at Mark Light Field, the home field of Miami Hurricanes baseball on the University of Miami campus

The University of Miami has won four national championships (1982, 1985, 1999 and 2001) and reached the College World Series 22 times in the 34 seasons since 1974. Multiple players for the Hurricanes baseball team have gone on to careers in Major League Baseball.

The team plays its games on the University of Miami campus at Alex Rodriguez Park at Mark Light Field. The team mascot is the Miami Maniac. The team is currently coached by J.D. Arteaga. In 2006, former Hurricanes baseball coach Ron Fraser was inducted into the College Baseball Hall of Fame.

The University of Miami baseball team holds the NCAA record for the most consecutive post season appearances (44 from 1973 through 2016). This streak is the longest of any major NCAA Division I men's sport, topping NCAA football's post-season streak of 35 seasons (Nebraska 1972 through 2006) and the NCAA basketball streak of 27 seasons (University of North Carolina 1974 through 2001).

=== Basketball ===
==== Men's basketball ====
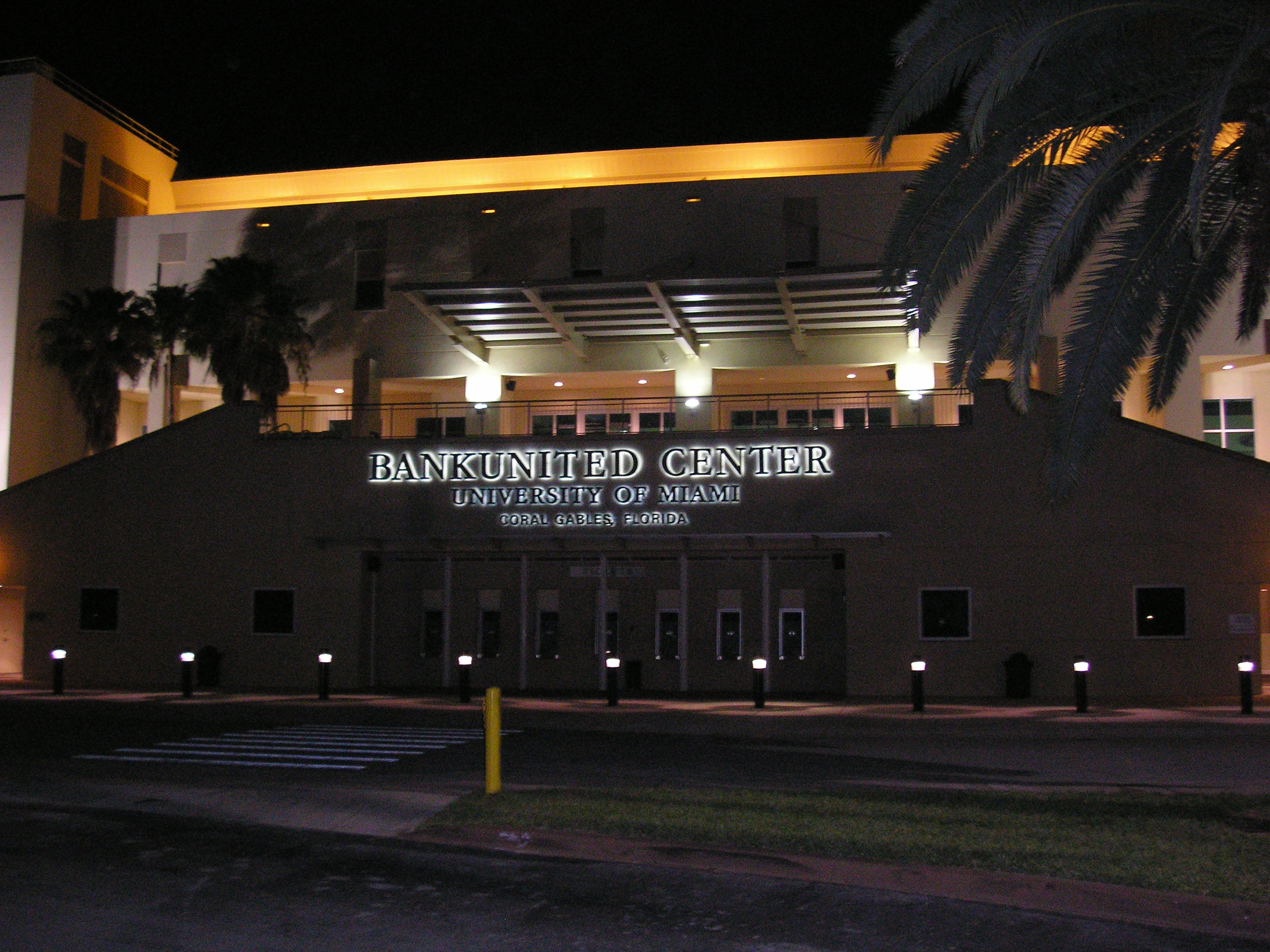
Watsco Center on the University of Miami campus, the home arena of the Hurricanes' men's and women's basketball teams

The University of Miami's men's basketball team has produced several players who have gone on to play professionally in the NBA. Rick Barry, who played his collegiate basketball at the University of Miami, is a member of the Basketball Hall of Fame. Barry is the Hurricanes' only consensus All-American in basketball and led the nation in scoring his senior year with a 37.4 average during the 1964–65 season.

The University of Miami men's basketball team was launched in 1926. In the middle of the 1970 season, the university's board of trustees attempted to shut the program down, which forced Will Allen to organize his teammates and strike because it was not sufficient notice for the players to transfer schools. They held a press conference, which caught the attention of national media. In 1971, the university dropped the program, with the board citing inadequate facilities, sagging attendance, and serious financial losses as justifications for the decision. Prior to the 1985–86 season, however, the program was revived, though the University of Miami would be minimally competitive over the next several years. The program's fortunes turned around in 1990 when Miami hired Leonard Hamilton as head basketball coach and accepted an invitation to join the Big East. By the end of the decade, Hamilton had turned the University of Miami into one of the better basketball programs in the Big East and guided the team to three straight NCAA tournament appearances (1998, 1999, and 2000), including a second seed in the 1999 tournament and a Sweet 16 appearance in 2000. The 1998 tournament appearance was the University of Miami's first since 1960.

Hamilton left at the end of the 2000 season to become head coach of the NBA's Washington Wizards and was replaced by Perry Clark. During Clark's second season (2001–02) the team won 24 games and was seeded fifth in the NCAA tournament. With the 2002–03 season, the team moved into its newly completed on-campus arena, the Watsco Center. Despite a win over powerhouse North Carolina to christen the new arena, Clark's teams performed woefully over the next two seasons. Clark was dismissed as head coach following the 2003–04 season, the University of Miami's last season in the Big East, and replaced by Frank Haith.

In the 2007–08 season, after being picked to finish last in the Atlantic Coast Conference, the Hurricanes finished the year 23–11 (8–8 in the ACC) and reached the second round of the NCAA tournament before falling to second seeded Texas. This was the team's first NCAA tournament bid since the 2001–2002 season.

For the 2009–10 season, Miami had a winning record overall (20–13), but finished last in the ACC with a record of 4–12.

In the 2012–2013 season, the University of Miami defeated first-ranked Duke 90–63, won their first 13 ACC games, and attained the highest Associated Press ranking (second in the nation) in school history. However, the Hurricanes lost to Wake Forest 80–65, which ruined their perfect record in ACC play that season. Miami went on to clinch the 2012–13 ACC regular season title with a home triumph over Clemson. Miami entered the ACC Tournament as the top seed and won the tournament with a win over North Carolina. Multiple UM members were recognized that season, including starting point guard Shane Larkin (ACC Player of the Year), senior shooting guard Durand Scott (ACC defensive player of the year), and Jim Larranaga (ACC Coach of the Year). Miami was selected as the second overall seed in East Region of the NCAA Tournament. In the tournament, they defeated Pacific University 78-49 and then defeated the University of Illinois 63–59, which advanced the team to the regional semifinals where they lost to Marquette.

Both the University of Miami men's and women's basketball teams play their home games at the Watsco Center on the University of Miami's Coral Gables campus. On April 22, 2011, George Mason Patriots head coach Jim Larranaga accepted the head coaching position after coaching the Patriots for 14 seasons.

==== Women's basketball ====
In 2009, University of Miami women's basketball forward Shenise Johnson competed on the gold medal-winning USA Team at the 2009 U19 World Championships.

In 2009–10, Miami finished last in the ACC. A year later, in the 2010–11 season, however, they went 26–3 (12–2 ACC) in the regular season to finish alongside Duke as regular season ACC champions. That season, Miami went undefeated at the Watsco Center, extending their home winning streak to 24 straight games. Despite a quarterfinal exit in the ACC Tournament, Miami's performance was enough to merit the program's first NCAA tournament bid since 1992. After cruising past Gardner–Webb in the first round, they lost to Oklahoma in the second. Head coach Katie Meier won National Coach of the Year, along with Connecticut's Geno Auriemma and Stanford's Tara VanDerveer. Junior guards Shenice Johnson and Riquana Williams were named to the All-ACC first team, sophomore forward Morgan Stroman was named to the all-conference third team, and Johnson was a third-team All-American.

The 2011–12 team returned every player from the 2010–11 squad and was picked in the preseason to win the ACC, though they finished 2nd. In the past seasons (2010–11 to 2015–16), they have made the NCAA Tournament five times.

Like the University of Miami's men's basketball team, its women's basketball team plays their home games at the Watsco Center on the University of Miami's Coral Gables campus.

=== Football ===
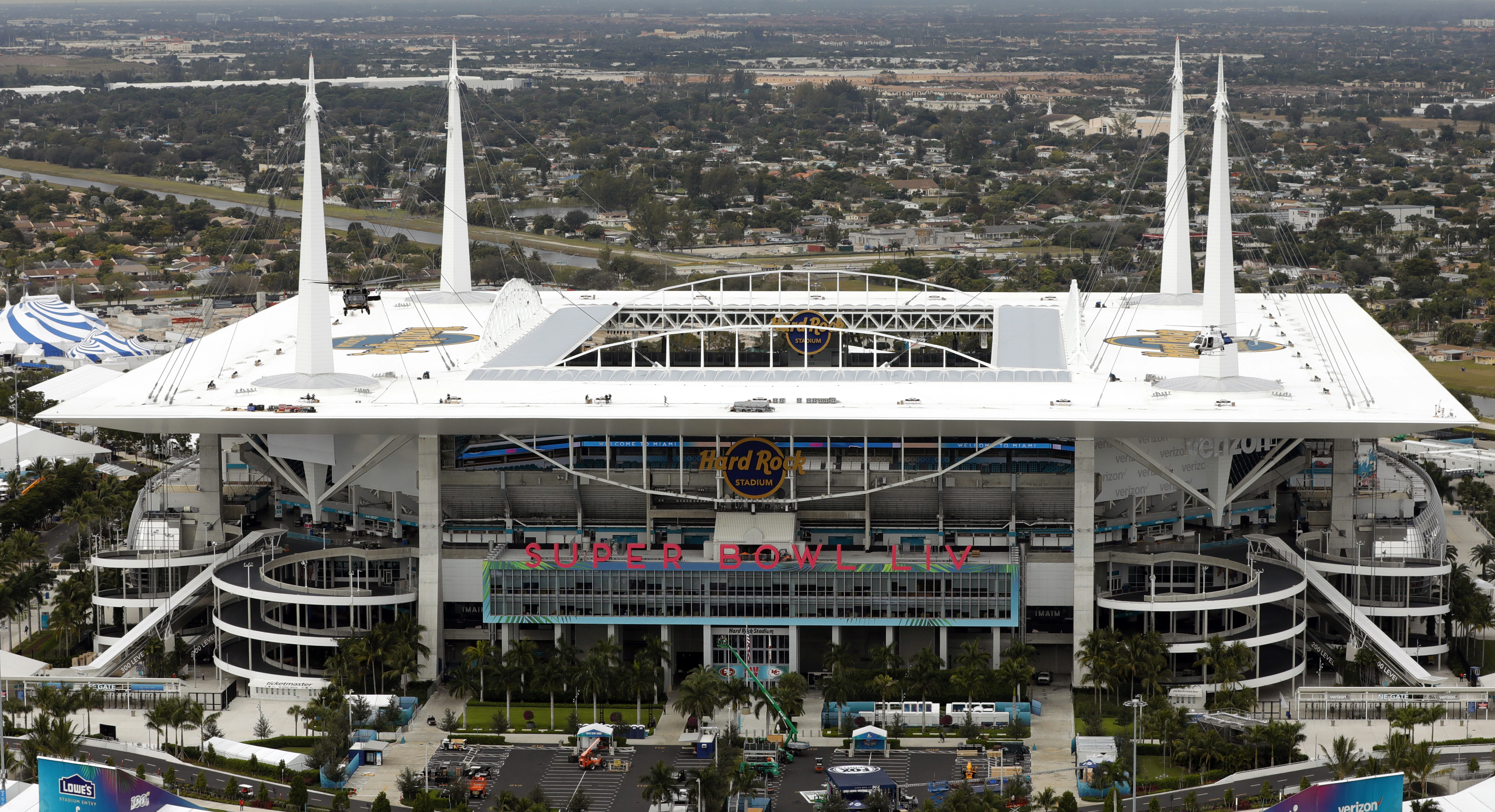
Hard Rock Stadium in Miami Gardens, the home field for the Miami Hurricanes football team

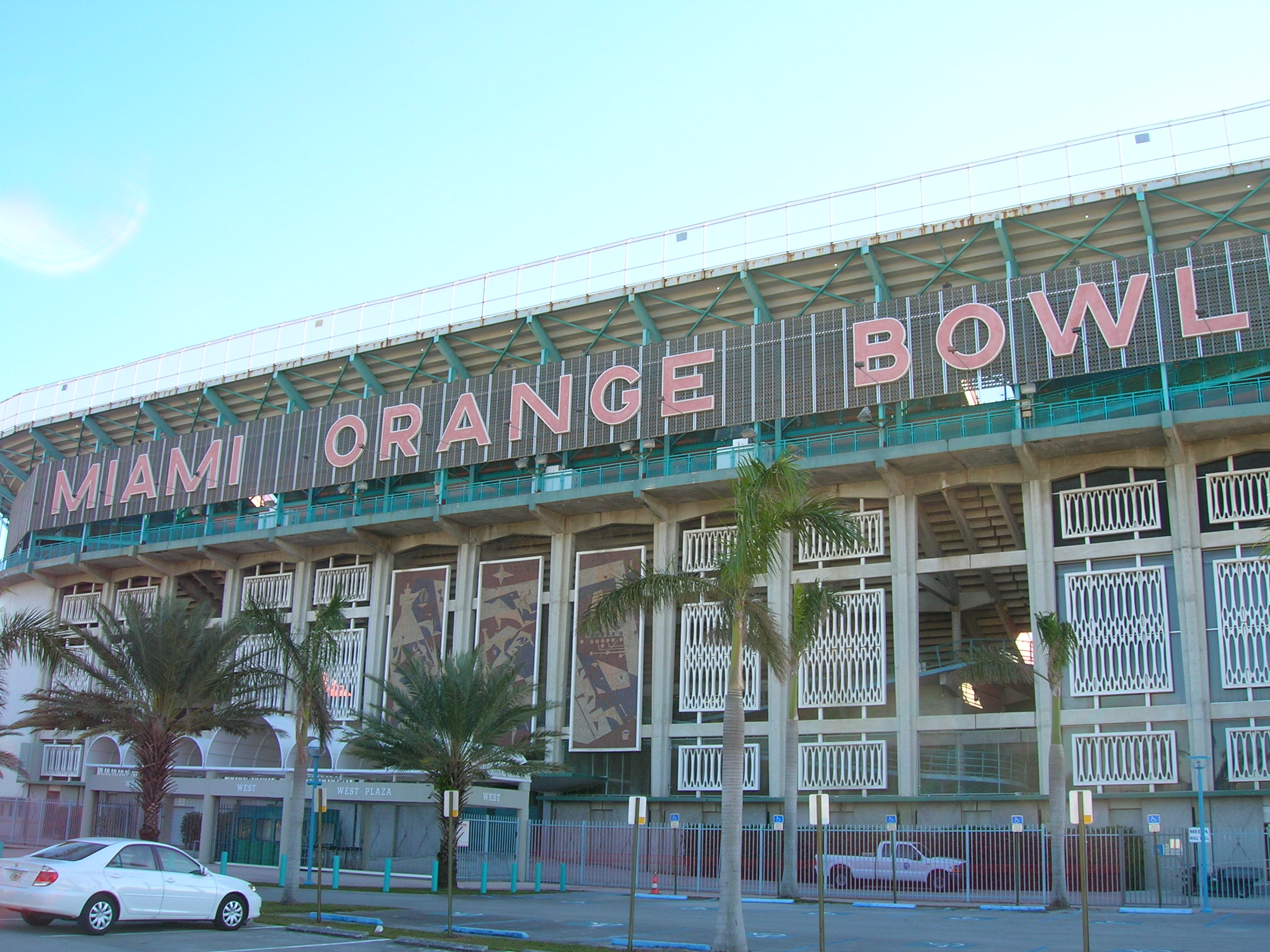
The Miami Orange Bowl in Little Havana, the home field for Miami Hurricanes football for 70 years, from 1937 through 2007

The University of Miami is one of the most predominant college football programs in the nation. They have won five NCAA Division I national football championships, in 1983, 1987, 1989, 1991, and 2001, and are currently tied for fourth on the list of all-time Associated Press National Poll champions. The Hurricanes have the 16th-highest winning percentage in NCAA Division I history as of 2018, at .635, and hold the second longest streak of weeks ranked first in the nation's Top 20 from October 14, 2001, to October 28, 2002.

As of 2019, the University of Miami has produced two Heisman Trophy winners, Vinny Testaverde in 1986 and Gino Torretta in 1992. Twelve members of the College Football Hall of Fame either played or coached at the University of Miami: Bennie Blades, Don Bosseler, Hendricks, Don James (played at Miami but was inducted as a coach), Russell Maryland, Ed Reed, Testaverde, Toretta, Arnold Tucker, and coaches Andy Gustafson, Jack Harding and Jimmy Johnson.

As of 2023, at least one University of Miami player has been selected in each of 49 consecutive NFL drafts, dating back to 1975. Among all colleges and universities, as of 2022, the University of Miami holds the all-time record for the most defensive linemen (49) and is tied with USC for the most wide receivers (40) to go on to play in the NFL.

To date, eleven Miami Hurricanes have been inducted into the NFL's Pro Football Hall of Fame: Jim Otto in 1980, Ted Hendricks in 1990, Jim Kelly in 2002, Michael Irvin in 2007, Cortez Kennedy in 2012, Warren Sapp in 2013, Ray Lewis in 2018, Ed Reed in 2019, Edgerrin James in 2020, and Devin Hester and Andre Johnson in 2024. Two former University of Miami players, Ottis Anderson and Lewis, have been named Super Bowl MVPs in Super Bowl XXV and Super Bowl XXXV, respectively.

Since 2008, the University of Miami has played its home games at Hard Rock Stadium in Miami Gardens, roughly 21 miles (34 km) north of the university's Coral Gables campus. Prior to this, from 1937 until 2007, Miami played their home games at the Miami Orange Bowl in Little Havana, which was demolished in 2008.

Among the team's highlights is the 2001 season, in which they finished with a perfect 12-0 record. They also went undefeated in the Big East Conference and capped off their season by winning the Rose Bowl, which served as the BCS National Championship Game, defeating Nebraska 37-14.

=== Men's and women's cross country ===
At the 2006 ACC Cross Country Championships, the University of Miami's men's cross country team finished in last place, 12th out of 12 participating teams, and the University of Miami's women also finished last out of 12.

In July 2008, Amy Deem was promoted to director of track and field and cross country, heading both the men's and women's cross country running programs. She was head women's track and field coach for the prior seven years.

At the 2009 ACC Cross Country Championship, the University of Miami's men's cross country team and women again finished last out of 12 teams.

=== Men's and women's tennis ===
The University of Miami tennis program has produced several men's and women's players who have gone on to amateur and professional accomplishment, including current Brazilian professional player Monique Albuquerque, Israel team player Maya Tahan, 1960 Wimbledon Singles champion Rod Mandelstam, 1987 Pan American Games Doubles gold medal winner Ronni Reis, 2006–07 NCCA Women's singles champion Audra Cohen, 1947 Wimbledon Doubles champion Doris Hart, and former professional tennis players Jodi Appelbaum-Steinbauer, Julia Cohen, Gardnar Mulloy, Ed Rubinoff, Michael Russell, Pancho Segura, and Todd Widom.

As of 2009, Kevin Ludwig was the head coach, and there were nine men and seven women on the tennis team. The men's team is coached by Mario Rincón, and women's team by Paige Yaroshuk-Tews.

=== Women's golf ===
The University of Miami's women's golf team has won the national golf championships five times, in 1970, 1972, 1977, 1978, and 1984. In 1959, 1965, 1972 and 1977, Judy Street, Roberta Albers, Ann Laughlin and Cathy Morse, respectively, won the women's intercollegiate individual golf championship, held by the Division of Girls' and Women's Sports from 1972 that was succeeded by the current NCAA women's golf championship.

The team plays its home golf matches at Deering Bay Yacht and Country Club in Coral Gables.

=== Women's rowing ===
In July 2009, Andrew Carter, a former assistant coach at Clemson University, was selected as the University of Miami's head rowing coach. Carter has over 20 years of experience coaching at the collegiate and international levels.

=== Women's soccer ===
The University of Miami added a women's soccer team in 1998. Miami's soccer team and its men's and women's track and field teams each play their home meets at Cobb Stadium, which opened in 1998 on the University of Miami's campus in Coral Gables.

=== Women's swimming and diving ===
In 2009, the University of Miami's women's swimming team finished 8th nationally with 219 points at the ACC Championships and 24th with 25 points at the NCAA Championships. The team has twice won the AIAW national championship (in 1975 and 1976). The team's home meets are held at the Whitten University Center Pool on the University of Miami campus in Coral Gables. The University of Miami does not currently have a varsity men's swimming team.

Home swimming and diving meets are held at the Whitten University Center Pool on the University of Miami campus in Coral Gables.

=== Women's track and field ===
One of the University of Miami's most notable track and field athletes is Lauryn Williams, who earned nine All-American honors. International in the 100 meter dash, Williams won the silver medal at the 2004 Summer Olympics in Athens, the gold medal at the 2005 World Championships in Athletics in Helsinki, and finished fifth at the 2009 World Championships in Athletics in Berlin.

In July 2008, Mike Ward, who served for five years as the University of Miami's assistant track and field coach and for 11 years as head coach, retired. Amy Deem, who had been the women's coach for 17 years, was appointed the University of Miami's director of track and field/cross country.

The University of Miami track and field team plays its home meets at Cobb Stadium on the University of Miami's Coral Gables campus.

=== Women's volleyball ===
The University of Miami's women's volleyball team had a 26–6 2008 season overall with a record of 14–6 in conference matches.

== Championships ==
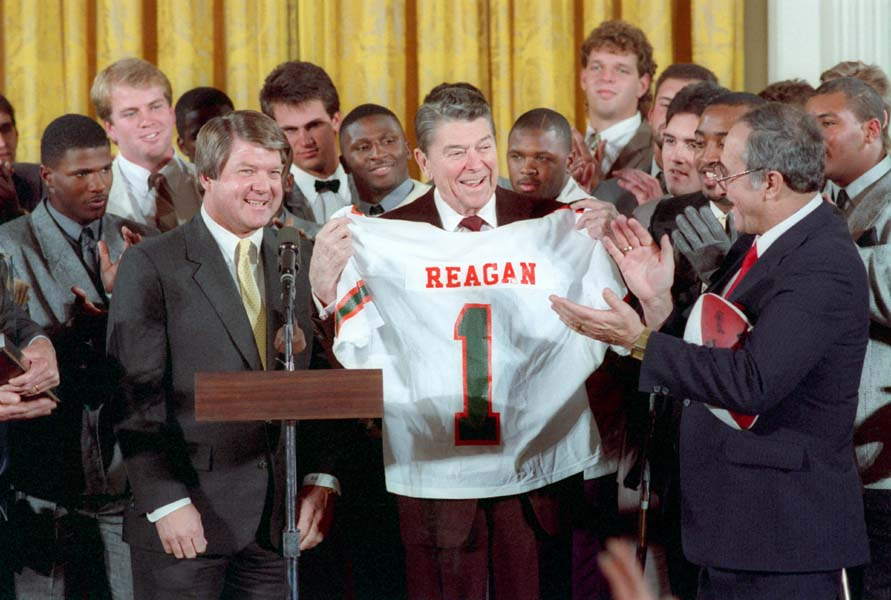
Jimmy Johnson and the 1987 Miami Hurricanes football team present President Ronald Reagan with a University of Miami jersey at The White House in January 1988 after winning the 1987 national championship

=== NCAA team championships ===
Miami has won five NCAA team national championships.

- Men's (4)
  - Baseball (4): 1982, 1985, 1999, 2001
- Women's (1)
  - Golf (1): 1984
- see also:
  - ACC NCAA team championships
  - List of NCAA schools with the most NCAA Division I championships

=== Other team championships ===
Below are 17 national team titles that were not bestowed by the NCAA:

- Men's (10):
  - Football (5): 1983, 1987, 1989, 1991, 2001
  - Polo (4): 1947, 1948, 1949, 1950
  - Roller Hockey (1): 2011
- Women's (7):
  - Crew, overall (1): 1999 (IRA)
  - Golf (4): 1970, 1972, 1977, 1978 (AIAW)
  - Swimming and Diving (2): 1975, 1976 (AIAW)

== Rivalries ==
=== Florida State ===
The University of Miami's traditional athletic rivals include the Seminoles of Florida State University and the Gators of the University of Florida. The Hurricanes have played more football games against the Seminoles (66) than against any other opponent; the Gators are second at 56 games.

In college football, the University of Miami-Florida State series began in 1951 and has been played annually since 1969. The teams' only bowl meeting was the 2004 Orange Bowl, prior to Miami leaving the Big East Conference to join the Atlantic Coast Conference, where Florida State has been a member since 1992. As of 2024, the Hurricanes hold a 36–33 series lead over the Seminoles in the rivalry.

=== Florida ===
The Hurricanes first played the Gators in football in 1938, and the teams played annually (except in 1943 when Florida did not field a team due lack of players due to World War II) until 1987. Since then, Miami and Florida have met only six times (four during the regular season in 2002, 2003, 2008, and 2013, and in two bowl games: the 2001 Sugar Bowl and the 2004 Chick-fil-A Bowl). The Hurricanes and the Gators last scheduled meeting was a game in Miami on September 7, 2013. As of 2013, Miami holds a 29–26 series lead over Florida in the rivalry.

== Sports Hall of Fame ==
The University of Miami Sports Hall of Fame is located next to the Hecht Athletic Center on campus. It houses many artifacts and memorabilia from the Hurricanes' athletic teams over the last eight decades. The Hall of Fame inducts former athletes, coaches, and administrators annually at an annual banquet. To be eligible, former student athletes must have been out of the University of Miami for at least ten years.

Since its inception in 1966, over 250 University of Miami athletes have been inducted in the Hall.

== Title IX ==
Student-Athletes as of 2014–2015 (Some Student-Athletes complete in multiple sports, and are counted multiple times)
Sport	Male Athletes	Female Athletes
Baseball	34	N/A
Basketball	14	13
Cross country	9	13
Diving (half sport)	3	N/A
Football	106	N/A
Golf	N/A	7
Rowing	N/A	46
Swimming & Diving	N/A	20
Track & Field	25	30
Tennis	9	7
Volleyball	N/A	14
Total	201	176

The University of Miami is in compliance with Title IX. However, in the past, female athletes filed complaints with the federal government in the 1970s and 1980s alleging unequal funding and facilities for UM women's sports. Of the $46.8 million in annual University of Miami athletic expenditures, $23.9 million was spent on men's team, $9.8 million was spent on women's teams, and $13 million cannot be allocated based on gender.

Miami has notable differences between the graduation rates of male and female student athletes. As of 2012, the university's graduation rates for student athletes was: 70% graduating within 4 years, 80% graduating within 5 years, and 82% graduating within 6 years. Male student athletes have a 57% graduation rate, and 67% of female student athletes graduate.

Some critics of Miami's allocation of fiscal resources within the university's athletics department have blamed the decision to drop certain men's teams on Title IX compliance.

== Club sports ==
=== Golf ===
The University of Miami golf club was reestablished in 2017 by University of Miami students as a response to the school having no varsity men's golf team. Competing in the Florida Region of the National Collegiate Club Golf Association (NCCGA) the team competes in six tournaments a year against predominantly other Florida-based universities and colleges. In 2019, the team qualified for nationals, held at WinStar World Casino in Oklahoma, for the first time in the club's history.

=== Co-ed sailing ===
The University of Miami's sailing team, called Sailing Canes, qualified for the Gill Co-ed National Championship in 2016 and 2018. Founded in 1961, the Sailing Canes are one of the university's oldest club sports teams. In 2004, they formed the first competitive sailing team at the university. Governed by the Inter-Collegiate Sailing Association, the University of Miami sailing team joined the South Atlantic District (SAISA) in 2004 and competes against the College of Charleston, University of South Florida, Eckerd College, University of North Carolina, University of Georgia, Duke University, the University of Florida, and other university and college clubs.

Miami and Biscayne Bay have exceptional sailing conditions, making the University of Miami an ideal location for a collegiate sailing team. The team currently practices at the United States Sailing Center on Bayshore Drive in Miami. The club is a student-run organization with four dedicated volunteer coaches from the Miami sailing community, enabling them to hold practice three days per week and accommodate students different class schedules. Team members are required to attend at least half of all practices and meetings to be considered active members. The University of Miami funds about half of their budget through the Student Activities Fund Committee (SAFAC), covering practice and facility expenses and travel within their district plus championship expenses. Expenses for travel to out-of-district inter-sectionals are funded solely through private donations.

== Former varsity sports ==
The University of Miami has sponsored other varsity sports in the past. The University of Miami polo team was undefeated in tournament play from 1948 to 1951. However, the games were poorly attended and the program ran a $15,000 deficit in 1950 and was dropped the following year. Boxing was one of the most popular and successful athletic programs on campus through the 1950s. Varsity boxing matches attracted sizeable crowds. A sanctioned men's soccer team played for a handful of years from the mid-1970s through the early 1980s, but the program received little funding and no scholarships and was ultimately dropped.

== Notable alumni ==
See: List of University of Miami alumni
