= Win Remmerswaal =

Dutch baseball player (1954–2022)

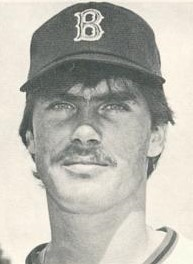
- Relief pitcher
- Born: March 8, 1954; The Hague, Netherlands
- Died: July 24, 2022 (aged 68); The Hague, Netherlands
- Batted: Right Threw: Right

MLB debut
- August 3, 1979, for the Boston Red Sox

Last MLB appearance
- October 5, 1980, for the Boston Red Sox

MLB statistics
- Win–loss record: 3–1
- Earned run average: 5.50
- Strikeouts: 36
- Stats at Baseball Reference

Teams
- Boston Red Sox (1979–1980)
Medals
Representing Netherlands
European Championship
Gold medal – first place	1973 Netherlands	Team

Wilhelmus Abraham Remmerswaal (March 8, 1954 – July 24, 2022) was a relief pitcher for the Boston Red Sox in Major League Baseball (MLB) in 1979 and 1980. Born in The Hague, Netherlands, Remmerswaal was the first European-trained player to reach the majors. He was the second Dutch-born MLB player since 1900, following Bert Blyleven, who grew up and learned the game in California.

Remmerswaal also pitched for the Netherlands national team and was named the best pitcher of the 1973 European Baseball Championship. Following his career in the United States, he pitched in the Netherlands and Italy.

== Early life ==
Born on March 8, 1954, Remmerswaal was born to a family of athletes; his father, Jacobus (“Jaap”) played association football with VUC Den Haag, while his brothers played football (including one with VV Spijkenisse) One of his brothers played baseball for ADO. Nicknamed Win, (short for Winneke, or Winnie, inspired by Winston Churchill), Remmerswaal began playing baseball with SV Wassenaar in 1970, moving to Storks a year later. He was on two Dutch Little League champion teams. In 1969, he won the Ron Fraser Award, given to the country's most promising youth player.

At the age of 17, he was selected to the Netherlands national baseball team. At the 1973 European Baseball Championship, the Netherlands defeated Italy for the title, and Remmerswaal was honored as the tournament’s best pitcher.

== Professional career ==
Remmerswaal signed with the Boston Red Sox as an amateur free agent in November 1974. He led the Florida State League with a 1.74 earned run average (ERA) in 1976. He reached Triple-A in 1977 and was the Pawtucket Red Sox's best right-handed reliever in 1978, winning two games in the International League championship.

Remmerswaal made his major league debut in August 1979. In 55 2/3 innings pitched over two partial seasons, all in relief, Remmserswaal had a 3–1 record with 36 strikeouts and a 5.50 ERA. Remmerswaal picked up his first major league win on August 15, 1979, when he and a series of other Boston relievers combined to defeat the Milwaukee Brewers 19–5. He pitched in 22 games with Boston, making his final major league appearance on October 5, 1980.

During his time in America, he was known for his eccentric behavior.

Following his major league career, Remmerswaal played one more season of Triple-A and pitched for Pawtucket in the longest game in professional baseball history. He later pitched for Amsterdam Pirates in the Honkbal Hoofdklasse and in the Italian Baseball League.

== Later life ==
In 1997, Remmerswaal lapsed into a coma after contracting double pneumonia with pleurisy. He lived in a nursing home in the Netherlands. He died July 24, 2022.
