= 1973 European Baseball Championship =

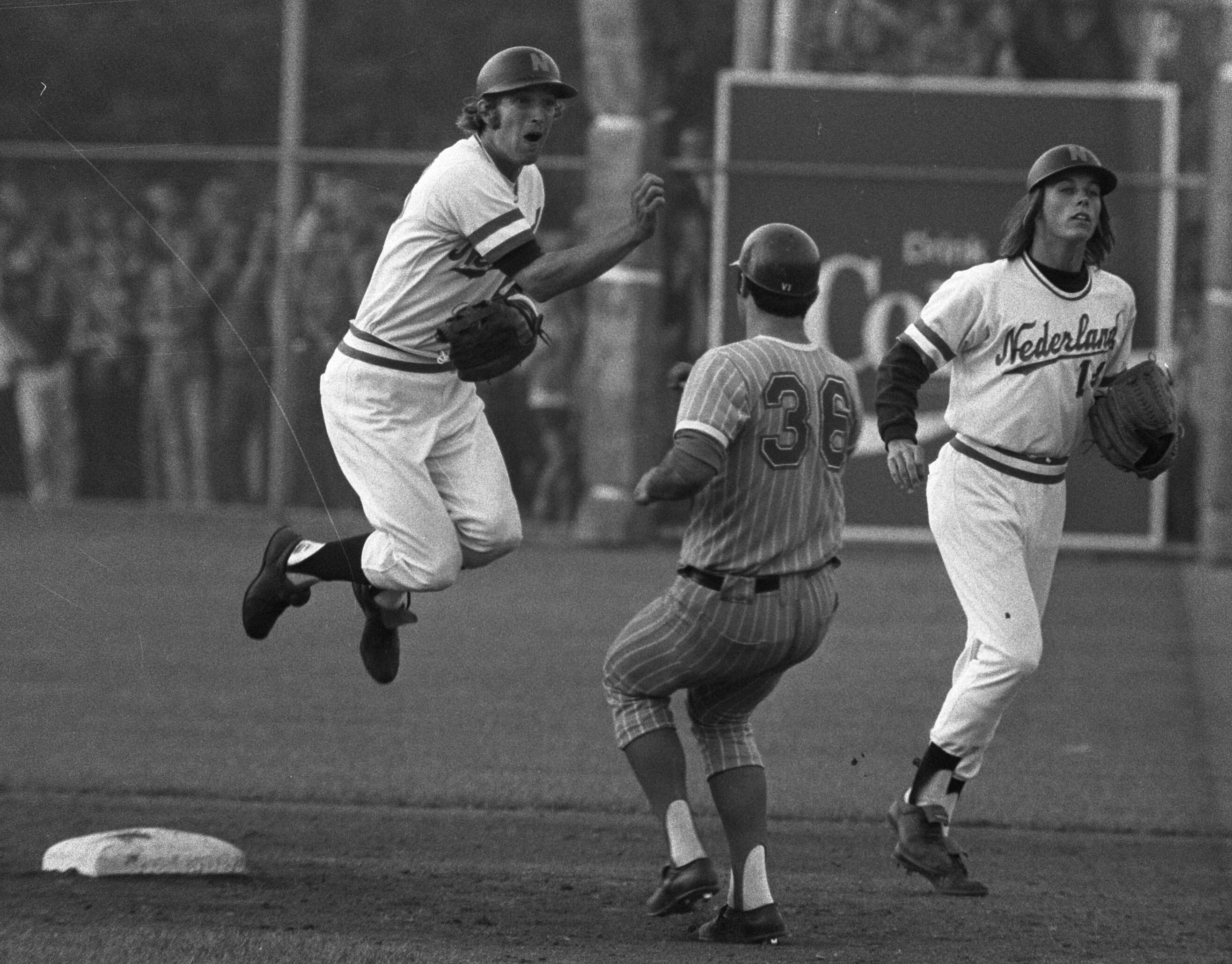
- Netherlands players Arnold Smit and Charles Urbanus Jr. playing defense against Italy

Tournament details
- Country: The Netherlands
- City: Haarlem
- Dates: 30 June – 8 July
- Teams: 6
- Defending champions: Netherlands

Final positions
- Champions: Netherlands (10th title)
- Runners-up: Italy
- Third place: Spain
- Fourth place: Belgium

Awards
- MVP: (Netherlands) Hamilton Richardson

The 1973 European Baseball Championship was held in Haarlem, the Netherlands. The host Netherlands team won and Italy finished in second for the third consecutive championship. The Dutch team went undefeated, after losing its first game ever in a European championship in 1971.

Future Boston Red Sox pitcher Win Remmerswal starred for the Dutch. He won the first game against Italy and was named the best pitcher of the tournament. The top two teams were both managed by American college baseball coaches, with Ron Fraser coaching the Netherlands and Bill Arce, who had coached the Dutch in the previous championship, managing Italy.

West Germany decided not to compete in the tournament after the schedule had been set, requiring changes from the organizers. The German team later similarly pulled out of the 1977 championship, also in Haarlem.

Major League Baseball commissioner Bowie Kuhn attended the tournament.

Spain's first win over Belgium was delayed due to fog and eventually suspended after the fifth inning, with a final score of 1–0.

== Standings ==
Pos.	Team	Record
1	Netherlands	8–0
2	Italy	6–2
3	Spain	4–4
4	Belgium	1–7
5	Sweden	3–4
6	France	1–7

== Awards ==
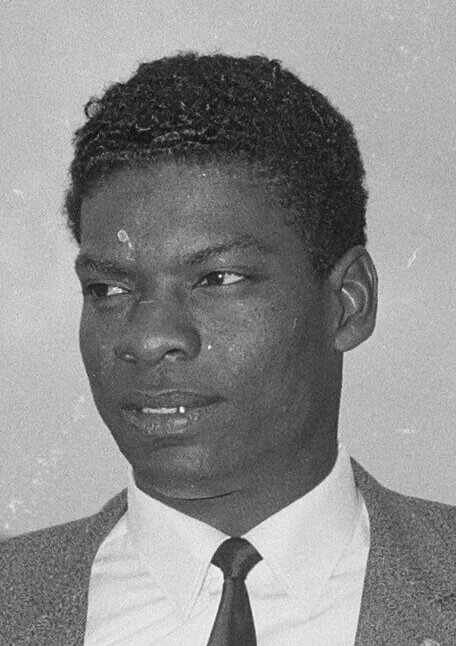
Tournament MVP Hamilton Richardson

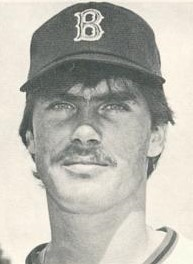
Best pitcher Win Remmerswal

- Most valuable player and best hitter: (Netherlands) Hamilton Richardson
- Best pitcher: (Netherlands) Win Remmerswal
- Most home runs: (Italy) Giorgio Castelli, 2
- Unluckiest player: Henri Hendrickx, who broke his little finger sliding during Belgium's first game
