= Henk Keulemans =

Dutch baseball player and manager

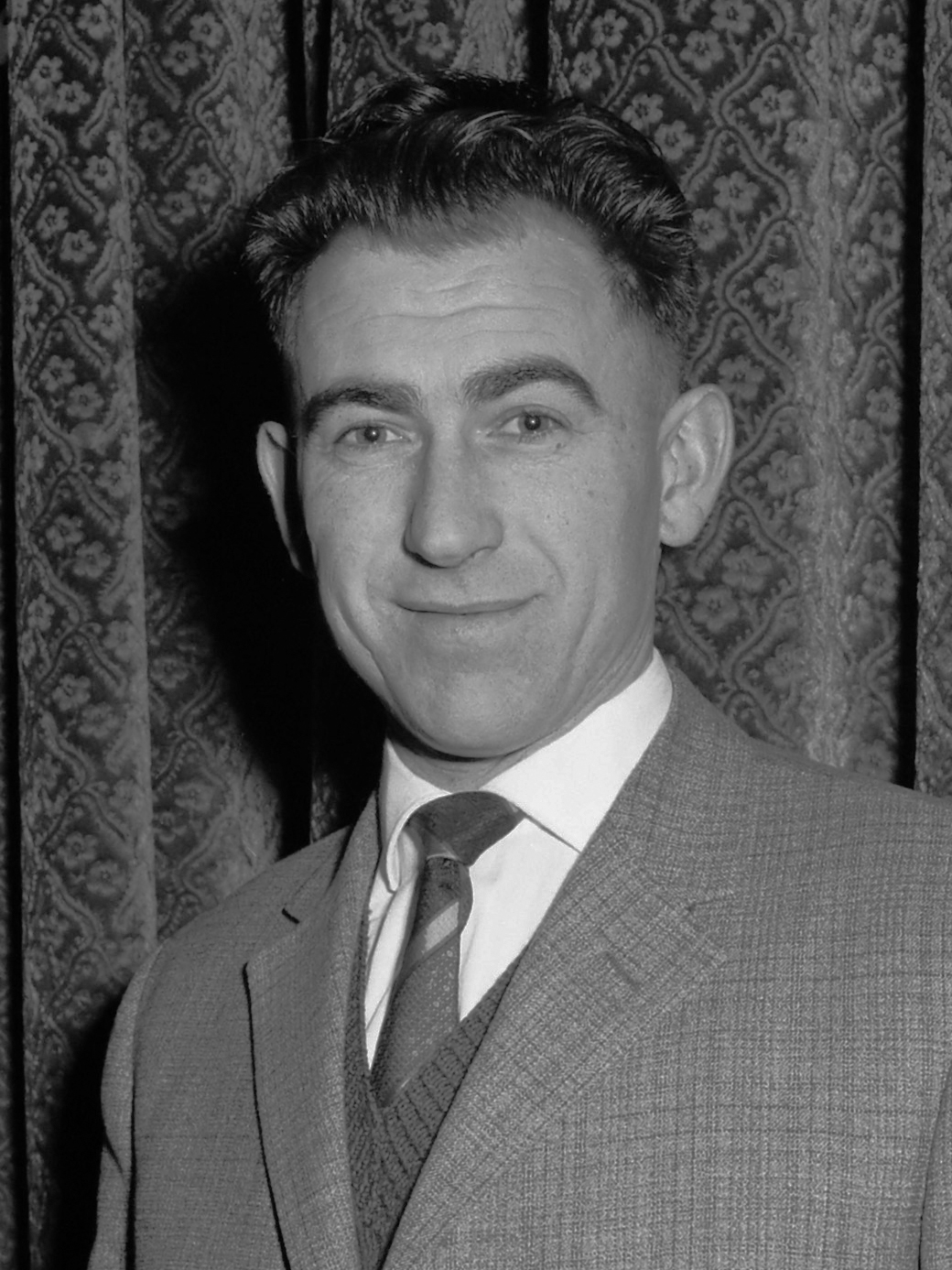
- Infielder / Manager
- Born: 7 June 1924
- Died: 7 November 2012 (aged 88); Schagen, Netherlands
- Batted: Unknown Threw: Right

Member of the Netherlands

Baseball Hall of Fame
- Induction: 1985
Medals
Representing Netherlands
Men's baseball
European Championship
Gold medal – first place	1956 Rome	Team (mgr)
Gold medal – first place	1957 Mannheim	Team (mgr)
Gold medal – first place	1958 Amsterdam	Team (mgr)
Gold medal – first place	1960 Barcelona	Team
Gold medal – first place	1962 Amsterdam	Team

Henk Keulemans (June 7, 1924 – November 7, 2012) was a Dutch baseball player and manager. He was the first manager of the Netherlands national baseball team, leading the team to three European Baseball Championships in the 1950s.

Keulemans began his playing career with SC Haarlem; in 1943, Keulemans and fellow Haarlem pitcher Roel de Mon joined SC Schoten. He would play with Schoten until 1965, winning the Honkbal Hoofdklasse championship on five occasions (1947, 1956, 1957, 1960, and 1961), the last two as the club's player–manager.

Keulemans debuted with the Dutch national team in a friendly against Belgium on August 1, 1948, in Antwerp; he would play 53 international games for the Netherlands. In 1956, he was named the team's first official manager (managerial duties had previously been shared by the players). Keulemans accepted the appointment on the condition that he would have sole authority to choose the team's players, and that he would be allowed to continue as a player–manager.

He led the Netherlands to its first international title at the 1956 European Baseball Championship, repeating in 1957 and 1958. He was also named the best second baseman of the 1958 tournament. He also led the Netherlands at the 1956 Global World Series, held in Milwaukee. Keulemans stepped down as manager of the national team after 1958, though he continued to play on the squad at Haarlem Baseball Week and in an exhibition trip against a semipro team in Michigan in 1961 (under manager Ron Fraser). He also led the Dutch team in batting average at the 1960 European championship.

Keulemans was the first player to be honored with the award for Most Valuable Player in the Dutch league in 1953 (an honor he earned again in 1960), and led the Honkbal Hoofdklasse in runs scored in 1960 (15), 1961 (16) and 1962 (30). He was inducted into the Netherlands Baseball Hall of Fame in 1985, the same year as fellow Dutch national team managers Fraser and Bill Arce.

Keulemans also played with VV Schoten, the club's association football division. He died in 2012 at age 88.

== Bibliography ==
- Reitsma, Theo (2005). Play Ball, Honkbalverhalen uit de dug-out van Nederland (in Dutch). Tirion Sport. ISBN 9789043907538.
