= Keulemans =

Keulemans or Ceulemans (Dutch pronunciation: [ˈkøːləmɑns]) is a Dutch surname. It may be of topographic origin, indicating an origin from Cologne (Dutch Keulen) or from a Keule (a Limburgish dialectical form of kuil, "hollow" / "depression"). Alternatively, it may be patronymic, stemming from Cole, an archaic short form of Nicolaas. Ceulemans is a relatively common name in Belgium (4943 people in 2008), especially in the province of Antwerp. People with the surname include:

- Axana Ceulemans (born 1968 & 1970), Belgian pop singer
- Estelle Ceulemans, Belgian politician and trade unionist
- François Ceulemans (fl. 1920), Belgian sport shooter
- Jan Ceulemans (born 1957), Belgian football player
- Jan Ceulemans (basketball) (1926–2022), Belgian basketball player
- Leontien Ceulemans (1952-2022), Dutch actress and television and radio presenter
- John Gerrard Keulemans (1842–1912), Dutch bird illustrator
- Henk Keulemans (1924–2012), Dutch baseball player
- James Keulemans (born 1970), international rugby player for the Dutch national team
- Lou Keulemans (1908–1977), Dutch chemist, pioneer in gas chromatography
- Raymond Ceulemans (born 1937), Belgian carom billiards player
- Rik Ceulemans (born 1972), Belgian long-distance runner
