= AHC Quick =

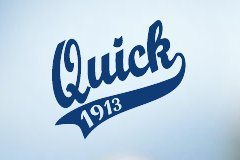

Information
- Location: Amsterdam
- Ballpark: Sportpark Sloten
- Founded: March 1, 1913
- League championships: 1922, 1925, 1935
- Colors: blue / grey / white
- General manager: Mr. Richard de Boer
- Website: www.quickamsterdam.nl

Current uniforms
Home	Away

AHC Quick (Amsterdamsche Honkbal Club Quick), commonly known as Quick Amsterdam, is a baseball and softball club based in Amsterdam, the Netherlands. Founded in 1913, it is the oldest baseball club in Europe still in existence. Today the club operates four men's baseball teams playing in the second, third and fourth divisions of Dutch baseball. However, the club's top men's baseball team has previously played in the Honkbal Hoofdklasse, winning the Holland Series three times between 1922 and 1935. The club's is the direct successor of Hercules, one of the three original members of the Dutch Baseball Association.

The club organizes annual reunions for former club members during the competition season. As from 2011 a committee is installed to prepare and organize festivities for the 100-year anniversary starting March 1, 2013. This will include a reception and several events throughout the year.

The club also has three men's softball team playing in the third division and four women's softball teams playing in the second, third and fourth divisions of Dutch softball. After many years of absence, in 2010 the club reinstalled a first team for children aged 9 to 12 and in 2011 plans to add a second team for the age group, in addition to a gender-mixed team for children 5 to 12 years of age.

Standard membership runs €223 for baseball and €217 for softball, although prices are discounted for children, students and members who sign midseason.

== See also ==
- Baseball in the Netherlands
