= Cocky (mascot) =

Mascot of the University of South Carolina athletics teams

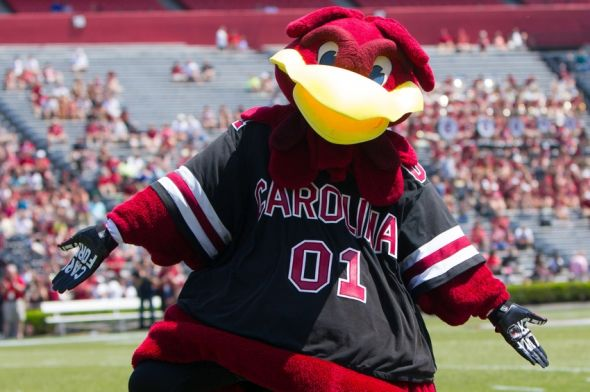
- University: University of South Carolina
- Conference: SEC
- Description: Gamecock
- First seen: 1980
- Related mascot(s): The Gamecock (1961); The Rooster (1971); Big Spur (1974)

Cocky is the costumed mascot of the University of South Carolina athletics teams. He represents a cartoon version of a gamecock (a fighting rooster). Cocky has won several mascot national championships. In 2019, for the 150th anniversary of college football, Sports Illustrated selected him as one of the greatest mascots in college football history. In 2026, he was inducted into the Mascot Hall of Fame.

== History ==
Although the Gamecock has been the University of South Carolina's official symbol since 1902, there was no official mascot until 1971. Jerry Spann, an undergraduate Business Administration student and head cheerleader, became USC's first mascot during the Duke game in 1961. The cheerleaders, tired of managing live roosters—especially after some mischievous students spiked the rooster’s water bowl with whiskey before a big game—realized the need for a new solution. It was clear that the university needed a mascot that could, well, handle his liquor. So, Jerry volunteered. With the help of his girlfriend’s mother, who created a unique outfit, Jerry donned an inflated rubber glove attached to a beanie cap that resembled a cock’s comb. He completed the look with a long-tailed coat, a feather duster tucked into the back, and a pair of yellow spats. This simple yet iconic costume transformed Jerry into ‘The Gamecock,’ a character that quickly became a tradition. On game days, students from opposing universities would chase him around the field, trying to steal his feather duster tail. But Jerry says he never really worried about losing the tail because the students chasing him were usually wearing loafers and often more than a little inebriated. Jerry always wore track shoes. Beginning in 1971, John Nelson, an undergraduate biology student, attended games in a Gamecock costume. This mascot was known as "The Rooster". The costume included fabric feathers, a cardboard bill, and Styrofoam spurs, and was made by his mother. The Rooster attended both basketball and football games. "The Rooster" costume can be seen at USC's McKissick Museum. Dr. John Nelson was also the Curator of the University of South Carolina Herbarium, before retiring in 2018.

The current version of Cocky made his debut, by Robert Lane, at the Homecoming game of 1980 against Cincinnati. He was portrayed as the son of Big Spur, a large, gangly barn yard rooster that had been attending games since 1978 as a mascot of the university.

Big Spur had been introduced as a fraternity pledge class project headed by student Chuck Eaton. Eaton served as the mascot from 1978 until 1980 when the role was taken over by USC students Robert Lane and John Routh. Big Spur was seen as too large and unwieldy with limited mobility.

Therefore, Cocky, Big Spur's "son", was brought in to replace Big Spur. When introduced, Cocky was originally booed off the field by students and fans who thought he was not "dignified enough". After this inauspicious beginning, the South Carolina Athletic Department determined Lane would wear the "Big Spur" costume for the remainder of the school year and John Routh would take over as "Cocky" in hopes that alumni would warm to the new mascot. Routh is credited with making "Cocky" a sensation – both at the University and nationally. A few years, later "Cocky" was named America's National Champion College Mascot, the first of five such titles to date.

After spending a year as the mascot for the women's teams as a female Cocky, he gained general acceptance primarily during the baseball season, and he slowly took over for Big Spur. In 1981 and 1982, Cocky was invited to be the official mascot of the NCAA Baseball College World Series in Omaha, Nebraska. He was chosen in a nationwide contest in 1986 as America's First 'National Mascot' by the Universal Cheerleading Association, Ford Motor Company, and American Airlines. He was mascot champion in 1986 and again in 1994, and the Capital One mascot championship in 2003. Cocky, portrayed by Blake Edmunds, picked up another national title in April '09 by winning the 2009 NCA Mascot National Title. Cocky was a member of the Capital One Bowl All-America Mascot Team in 2003, 2004, 2005, 2007, and 2008.

The original Cocky was John Routh, 1980–1982, who became the mascot for the University of Miami, and later became Billy the Marlin for the Florida Marlins. Charlie Fitzsimmons followed in 1983–1985. The anonymous JH had the longest tenure from 1985–1992. He redesigned Cocky from the inside-out to allow for more mobility and a kinder more adroit, cartoon-like character. He was fluent in American Sign Language (ASL), which delighted audiences. In the summer of 1985, at the Universal Cheerleading Summer Mascot Camp, he was voted by the other college mascots as the Best Of The Best, and received the Master Key to Spirit Trophy.

JH was the winner of the first National Mascot contest ever held in 1986, based on the 1985–1986 season of performances. (He held the title of "National Champion Mascot" from 1985–1987). That year, he was recognized with a Concurrent Resolution by the SC House of Representatives as "Goodwill Ambassador of the State of South Carolina". The national attention became intense – over the years, he met Pope John Paul II, President Reagan, President Bush, and many other celebrities. After winning Nationals, he received a call from The Tonight Show. They wanted him to do a skit, then disrobe and talk to Johnny. JH strongly believed in anonymity and that the character should remain the focus and gain all of the attention for USC, creating a mystique surrounding the character. For these reasons, he turned down The Tonight Show request. In a 1990 survey taken of SC residents, Cocky was noted as the "most positive and easily recognizable image of the University of SC". He was hired by the University of SC in 1988 to continue representing USC and the State of SC as a Goodwill Ambassador. At that time, he was one of only two college mascots in the nation that were hired as a full-time mascot.

In 1992, the university decided to move Cocky from under the umbrella of Athletics/Public Relations to Student Affairs. From that point forward, Cocky was to be portrayed by a series of students. JH left USC (after seven years/1378 appearances) and, at the recommendation of SC Coach Emeritus Frank McGuire, he became a mascot for Shinn Enterprises (Charlotte Hornets of the NBA, and the Charlotte Knights of AAA International League Baseball). JH, as Homer the Dragon for the Charlotte Knights, performed with his predecessor from USC, John Routh, as the Florida Marlin when the teams played each other in 1996. When Charlotte was not playing, he was hired by other teams to provide entertainment in stadiums across the nation. The National Baseball Congress in Wichita, Kansas hired him as entertainer for their World Series in 1995. In 1986, he became mascot director for the National Cheerleading Association (NCA). He founded the "National Mascot School" for NCA, wrote a curriculum and handbook and trained a staff who traveled the United States teaching "the art of Mascot" at high school and college summer camps.

JH stated that the most important and most memorable thing he did as Cocky was to visit terminally ill children and adults across the state. There were five "last request" situations in which people wanted a visit from Cocky. He made four of those visits, but regrettably was too late for the fifth.

Tommy Donavan portrayed Cocky beginning in 1992, and later became the Carolina Panthers mascot, Sir Purr. Routh and Donovan appeared together in 1991 at the Japan Bowl in Tokyo, an all-star football game – Donovan as Cocky, and Routh as The Miami Maniac, the mascot of University of Miami baseball. Jamie Ballentine is one of the longest-serving student Cocky at four years from 2002–2006, during which he won Capitol One's Mascot Bowl. Matt Hammett matched Ballentine’s four years. While serving as mascot, he appeared on stage with Hootie & the Blowfish and Barenaked Ladies during the Group Therapy Tour in Columbia. Adam Compton matched Ballentine's four years, serving as Cocky from 2018–2022. Compton was Cocky from the end of his freshman year at South Carolina through his first year at the South Carolina School of Law, and was the first law student to be Cocky. Nicole Hurley was revealed as Cocky for 2024-2025 at the graduation ceremony in May 2025.

Cocky is a popular mascot among younger fans and often represented in costumes at fan events.
