= L. M. van Wijk =

Leo M. van Wijk (born 18 October 1946 in Amsterdam) is a Dutch executive, and former president and CEO of KLM and vice-chairman of Air France-KLM S.A.

Van Wijk studied at University of Amsterdam, receiving a master's degree in Econometrics in 1971. He joined KLM Royal Dutch Airlines on that year, starting with various positions in Automation Services. In 1977, he moved to the Cargo Division, being appointed Manager Cargo Handling in March 1979. Successive career moves were to Manager Cargo Marketing in 1983, Vice President KLM Marketing in 1984, Deputy to the Senior Vice President Commercial Services in 1987 and Senior Vice President Corporate Development in 1989.

Van Wijk was also a skilled athlete. He played football for Ajax and was in the same teams as Johan Cruyff albeit he never reached the first team. As a baseball player, he reached the first team of Ajax, which competed in the top domestic league, the Honkbal Hoofdklasse. He made his debut in 1964 in the major league with Ajax against the Haarlem Nicols in the seventh inning and hit a home run. He played shortstop.

Van Wijk joined KLM's Board of Managing Directors on January 1, 1991. With the reorganization of the company's top management, effective January 1, 1997, he took on the responsibilities of Chief Operating Officer (COO) as a member of the Board.

Van Wijk became KLM's President and chief executive officer (CEO) on August 6, 1997. His term ended in 2007.

Mr van Wijk has also been a member of:

- Northwest Airlines board of directors
- Martinair supervisory board
- ABN AMRO advisory council
- Aegon supervisory board
- Randstad NV supervisory board
- AFC Ajax supervisory board
