= Sebastian the Ibis =

Mascot of the University of Miami

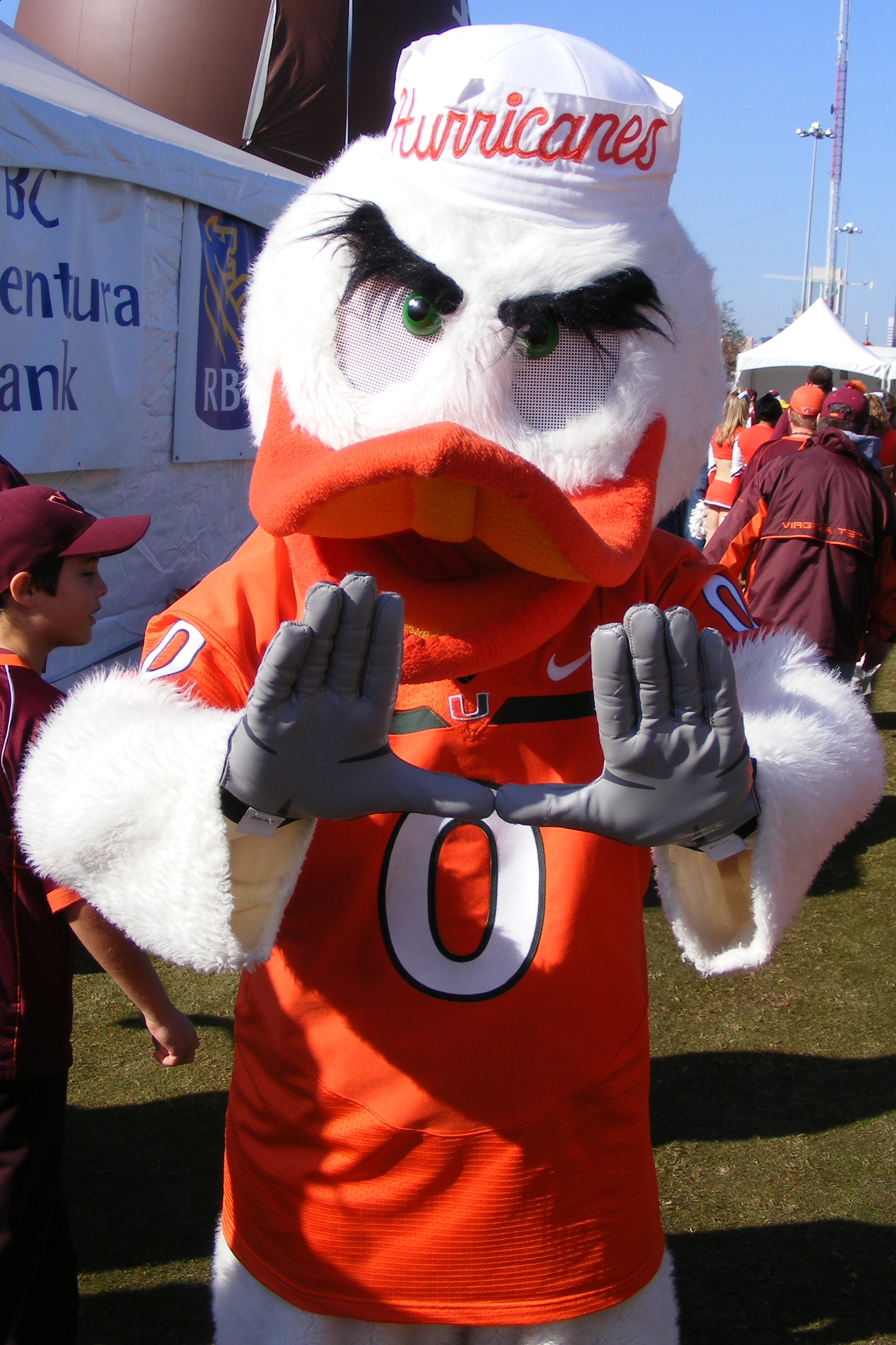
- Sebastian the Ibis making the University of Miami's "U" sign in 2007
- University: University of Miami
- Conference: ACC
- Description: Anthropomorphic white ibis
- Origin of name: San Sebastian Hall
- First seen: 1957

Sebastian the Ibis is the mascot for the Miami Hurricanes of University of Miami. He is an anthropomorphic white ibis with a Miami Hurricanes football jersey, number 0.

== History ==
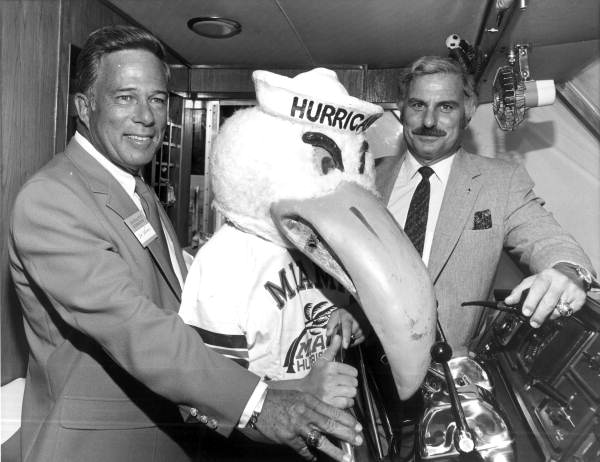
Former Miami Hurricanes football coach Howard Schnellenberger (right) with Sebastian the Ibis (center) in 1981

The ibis was chosen as the University of Miami's unofficial mascot by Nathan Duncan in 1926, after the University of Miami student body chose the school's yearbook's name to be The Ibis.

"Miami adopted a native marsh bird called the Ibis as the official mascot in 1926. The Ibis is known for its bravery as a hurricane approaches. Folklore maintains that other birds look to the Ibis for leadership. The Ibis uses its instinct to detect danger. It is the last sign of wildlife to take shelter before a hurricane hits, giving warning that danger is imminent. As the storm passes the Ibis is the first to reappear, a sign that clear skies are approaching."

The first official mascot for the Miami Hurricanes was a 65-pound brown and white boxer dog named Hurricane I. Chosen in 1950, the canine wore a ceremonial orange and green blanket with his name lettered in white.

Sebastian was created in August 1957 by Norman A. Whitten, Director of the Student Union at UM, and was used as a homecoming competition entry. The next year, student John Stormont performed at Miami Hurricanes football games dressed up in a homemade ibis costume. The original costume was made from various materials: armolite insulation for the head, white terry cloth for the body to resemble feathers, ROTC spats for the feet, and toes made from burlap. "The whole costume took three weeks to complete and cost about $30", Stormont said in a Miami Herald interview. The most recent iteration of the costume dates back to 1984.

The ibis was originally named "Icky", but was later renamed after San Sebastian Hall, where John Stormont was a resident. The building, now an apartment building, still stands at the intersection of LeJeune Road and University Drive in Coral Gables.

During the first national championship season for the Miami Hurricanes football team, the Ibis was portrayed by Bill Mooney, a senior at the university from Orangeburg, New York. This second generation Ibis costume was designed and made by UM alumnus and former Disney artist Randy Jacky (RJ) Ogren. Sebastian appeared in the 1983 National Championship victory parade riding with then head coach Howard Schnellenberger following the Hurricanes winning the 1983 NCAA national football championship.

From 1984 to 1992, Sebastian was portrayed by John Routh, who also portrayed the Miami Maniac at University of Miami baseball games, and later portrayed Billy the Marlin for the Miami Marlins. Routh created Sebastian's signature C-A-N-E-S cheer in which Sebastian forms the letters with his body.

Sebastian typically leads the University of Miami football team onto the field before games. During home games at Hard Rock Stadium, this scene is one of the most notable in all of college football, accompanied by the release of smoke as Sebastian leads the Hurricanes team onto the field at the game's beginning.

The identities of the students who portray Sebastian are not made public until they graduate and their identities are typically a hot topic of discussion amongst both students and faculty; as a University of Miami tradition, these students reveal their roles when they graduate by wearing the mascot's feet to their commencement ceremonies.

=== Controversies ===
- On October 28, 1989, Sebastian was tackled by a group of police officers for attempting to put out Chief Osceola's flaming spear prior to Miami's game against long-standing rival Florida State at Doak Campbell Stadium in Tallahassee. Sebastian was wearing a fireman’s helmet and yellow raincoat and holding a fire extinguisher. When a police officer attempted to grab the fire extinguisher, the officer was sprayed in the chest. Sebastian was handcuffed by four officers and detained but ultimately released. Miami quarterback Gino Torretta, who started the game in place of injured Craig Erickson, told ESPN, "Even if we weren't bad boys, it added to the mystique that, 'Man, look, even their mascot's getting arrested.'"

== See also ==
- List of college mascots in the United States
