= Miami Maniac =

College baseball mascot

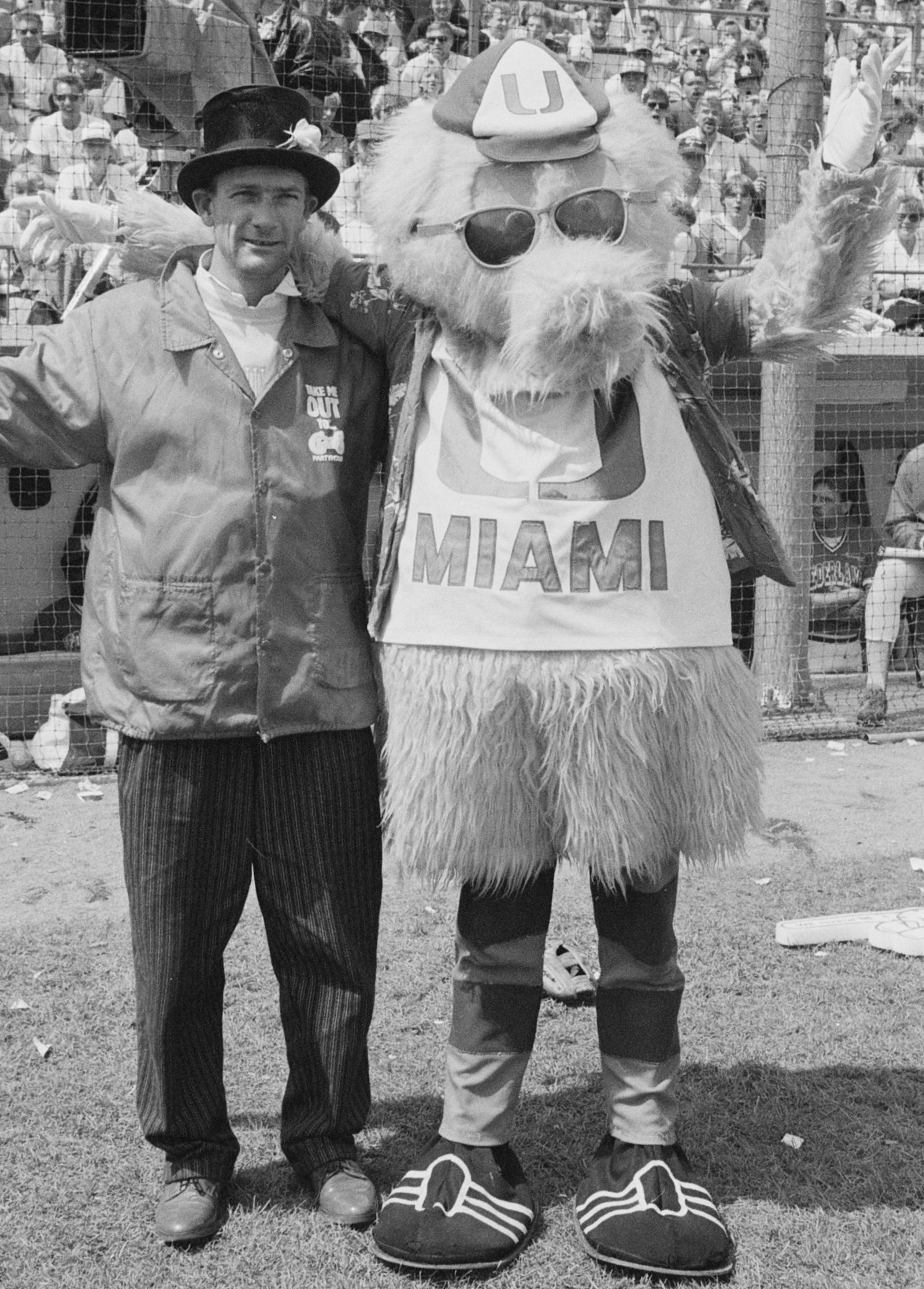
- The Maniac (right) in 1986
- Team: Miami Hurricanes baseball
- Conference: ACC
- Description: Anthropomorphic; orange and green colored.
- First seen: 1982
- Related mascot(s): Sebastian the Ibis
- Website: Miami Maniac

The Miami Maniac (often shortened to just The Maniac) is the official mascot of the Miami Hurricanes baseball program at the University of Miami in Coral Gables, Florida.

College Baseball Hall of Fame head coach Ron Fraser created the Maniac in 1982, with John Routh as the original performer. The Miami Maniac has an anthropomorphic body mostly covered by orange fur, with patches of green on his head and large snout. He usually wears a Miami baseball jersey with the number 1/2 on it.

The Maniac is the mascot of only Hurricanes baseball. Sebastian the Ibis represents Miami's other teams.

== History ==
The Miami Maniac first appeared in 1982 and was played by a University of South Carolina (USC) undergraduate student named John Routh, who helped create the Gamecocks' mascot Cocky. Routh's performance as Cocky at Gamecock baseball games had such a positive response that he was invited to the 1981 College World Series (CWS) to perform as the Series' official mascot. Miami head baseball coach Ron Fraser was impressed by Cocky's performance at the CWS. Fraser was always looking for opportunities to promote Hurricane baseball and college baseball generally and decided to create a mascot specifically for Hurricane baseball.

The following year, in 1982, Fraser and a major university donor helped create the Miami Maniac. They introduced the Maniac during Miami's series against Florida State that year and invited Routh down from South Carolina to show students how to work a crowd. After the Hurricanes won their first CWS championship in 1982, Fraser offered Routh a permanent position as assistant director of marketing, which included performing as both the Miami Maniac and Sebastian the Ibis. Routh, who had just graduated from USC, accepted the position. During his tenure at the Miami, Routh created many of the cheers now associated with Hurricanes athletics. The Maniac developed the "C-A-N-E-S... Canes!" cheer, which has become a popular tradition among Miami football fans.

=== Wedding ===
In March 1985, the Miami Maniac married Mrs. Maniac, who was performed by Nancy Vasquez, in a ceremony during a game between the Hurricanes and the Maine Black Bears. The 14-minute ceremony was nationally broadcast live in its entirety on ESPN. Longtime Miami baseball and football announcer Jay Rokeach conducted the ceremony. Sebastian the Ibis served the Maniac's best man. Other mascots in attendance included Budweiser's Bud Man, McDonald's character Grimace, and McGruff the Crime Dog.

=== Other events ===
In addition to performing at Miami baseball games and other university functions, the Maniac performs at various sporting and charity events. The Maniac has appeared at various Minor League Baseball games throughout Florida and has entertained in 49 of the 50 U.S. states and in Europe and Japan.

From 1983 through 1991, the Maniac was the official mascot of the NCAA Division I College World Series in Omaha, Nebraska, although the character had to wear a neutral jersey during each series to avoid being seen as favoring Miami when they participated in the tournament.

The Hurricanes released a non-fungible token (NFT) of the Maniac after launching their own NFT platform in 2021.
