= Ajax HVA =

Dutch professional baseball club

Ajax Amsterdam

Information
- League: Honkbal Hoofdklasse
- Location: Watergraafsmeer, Amsterdam
- Ballpark: O.V.V.O. Stadium
- Founded: 1922–1972
- League championships: 1924, 1928, 1942, 1948
- Colors: Red, White, Cobalt blue and Dark blue

Current uniforms
| Home | Away |

Ajax Honkbalvereniging Amsterdam (English: Ajax Baseball Club Amsterdam) (Dutch pronunciation: [ˈaːjɑks]), also referred to as Ajax HVA, Ajax Amsterdam or simply Ajax (after the legendary Greek hero), was a Dutch professional baseball club based in Amsterdam. The club were founding members of the Dutch Hoofdklasse, where they competed since the league's inception in 1922 until the club folded in 1972, having won the league title a total four times.

The team was associated with acclaimed Dutch football club AFC Ajax, in their attempt to expand into baseball, having spent 50 years at the top flight of professional baseball in the Netherlands.

== History ==
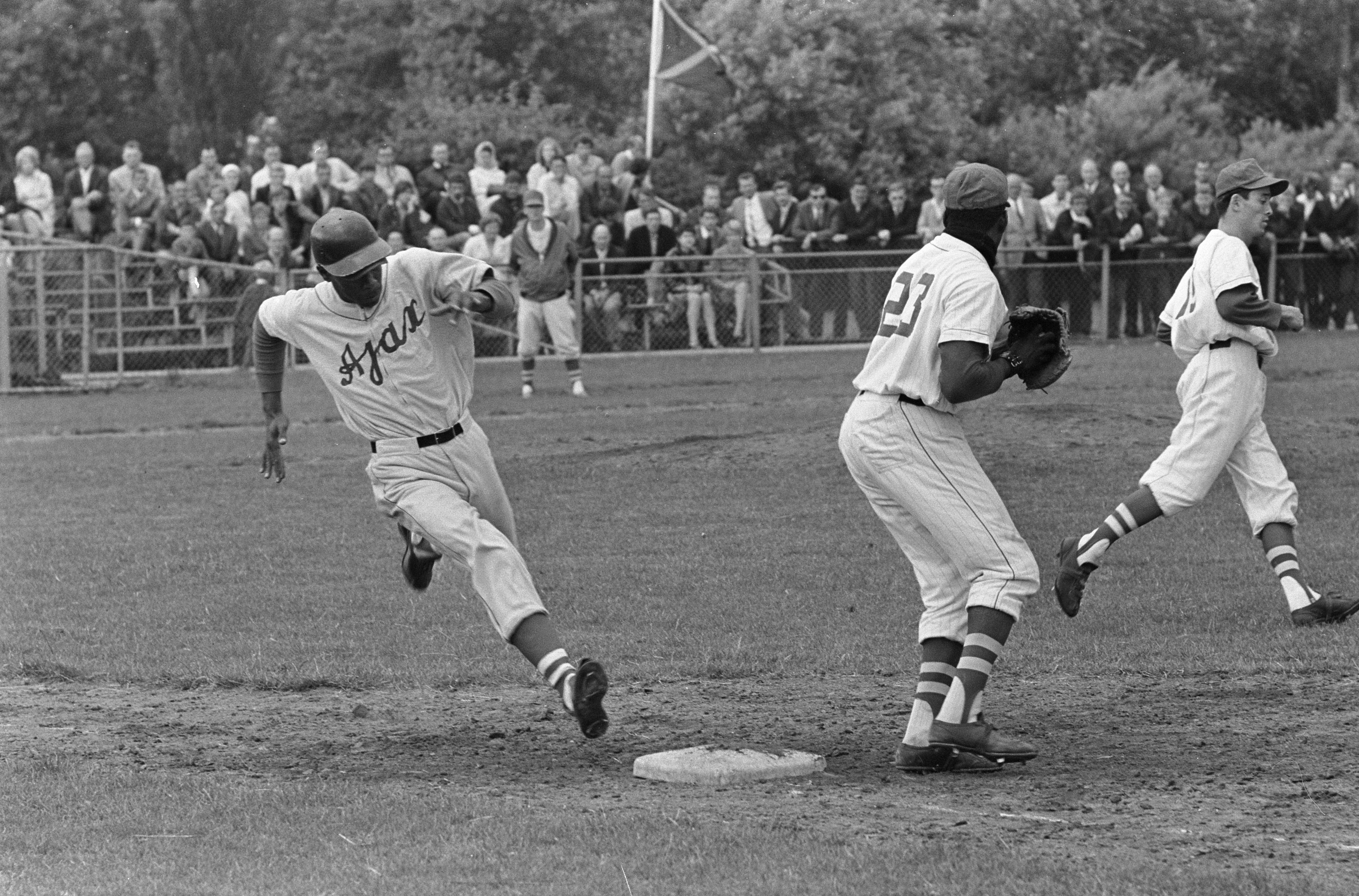
Ajax - Sparta 23 July 1967

As founding members of the Dutch Hoofdklasse in 1922, Amsterdam's well-known football club AFC Ajax fielded a baseball team in the highest level of professional baseball in the Netherlands, playing their home matches at the stadium of OVVO on the Kruislaan in Amsterdam-Oost. Famous former players include Marco Nagelkerken, Ruben Leysner, Peter Hendriks, Boy Balinge, Ko van Wijk, Leo van Wijk, Herre Kok, Dassy Jasmijn, Jessie Delanoy. In 1972 the club decided to no longer field a baseball team, and to focus solely on football, leaving the baseball players of Ajax without a club. The players soon found a new sponsor with mustard manufacturing company Luycks. Finally merging with another baseball club from Amsterdam the Giants Diemen, together they formed the Luycks Giants, which replaced both its former clubs.

In 1977 the sponsor changed to Uitzendburo Unique and the club's name was forthwith "Unique Giants", which existed until at least 1980.

Legendary Dutch football player Johan Cruijff played for the club's baseball team during the summer (football off-season) early on in his career. He played in various positions on the team including catcher, as seen in a photograph dated from 1961 on the club's website.

== Notable former players ==
- (Netherlands) Johan Cruijff
- (Netherlands) Marco Nagelkerken
- (Netherlands) Ruben Leysner
- (Netherlands) Peter Hendriks
- (Netherlands) Boy Balinge
- (Netherlands) Ko van Wijk
- (Netherlands) Leo van Wijk
- (Netherlands) Herre Kok
- (Netherlands) Dassy Jasmijn
- (Netherlands) Jessie Delanoy

== Honours ==
=== National ===
- Hoofdklasse: 4

1924, 1928, 1942, 1948
