= William Arce =

American baseball coach (1925–2016)

Bill Arce
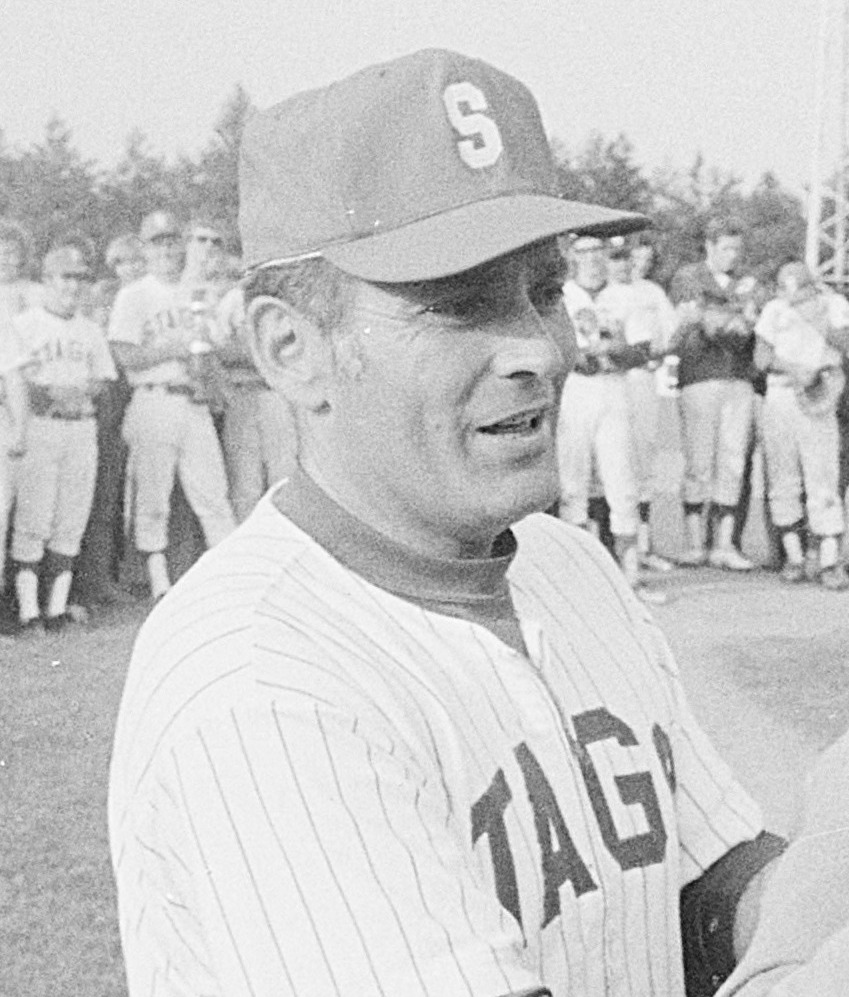
- Arce at the 1971 Haarlem Baseball Week
- Born: June 24, 1925; Oakland, California
- Died: March 7, 2016 (aged 90); Pomona, California

Member of the Netherlands

Baseball Hall of Fame
- Induction: 1985
Medals
Men's baseball
Manager
European Championship
Gold medal – first place	1971 Parma / Bologna	The Netherlands
Gold medal – first place	1975 Barcelona	Italy

William Benjamin Arce Jr. was an American baseball coach and manager in college baseball and European baseball. He was the founding athletic director at the Claremont Colleges in California. The Claremont-Mudd-Scripps Stags baseball stadium is named after him.

Arce was the head coach of the Claremont baseball team from 1958 to 1979, compiling a win–loss record of 446–354–16 (.556) and leading the Stags to Southern California Intercollegiate Athletic Conference championships in 1970, 1971, and 1975. He was one of the five finalists for the baseball coach of the year award by the American Association of College Baseball Coaches in 1975 and was inducted into the NAIA Hall of Fame 1976. He won the American Baseball Coaches Association's Lefty Gomez Award in 2001.

After retiring in 1983, Arce spent his summers and sabbatical leaves developing baseball internationally. He was the first American baseball coach to provide baseball instruction in Belgium (1962), Sweden (1962), Czechoslovakia (1969), Yugoslavia (1979), and China (1980). In 1985, he founded International Sports Group, a non-profit organization that conducts international coaching clinics.

Arce led a team with many Claremont players, the California Stags, to play in the Haarlem Baseball Week tournament in the Netherlands, winning it in 1966. He was named the best coach of the tournament in 1963 and 1971. Arce also managed the national teams of both the Netherlands (1971) and Italy (1975) to the European Baseball Championship. Arce was also on the coaching staff for the U.S. national collegiate team in 1970 and for USA Baseball in 1976 and 1978. He later coached France in the 2003 European championship. Arce was inducted into the Netherlands Baseball Hall of Fame in 1985.

== Personal life and death ==
Arce was a veteran of World War II, having fought in the Battle of the Bulge in 1944.

Arce died on March 7, 2016 in Pomona California at the age of 90. He was married and had three children, nine grandchildren, and four great grandchildren.
