= Ron Fraser =

American baseball player and coach (1933–2013)

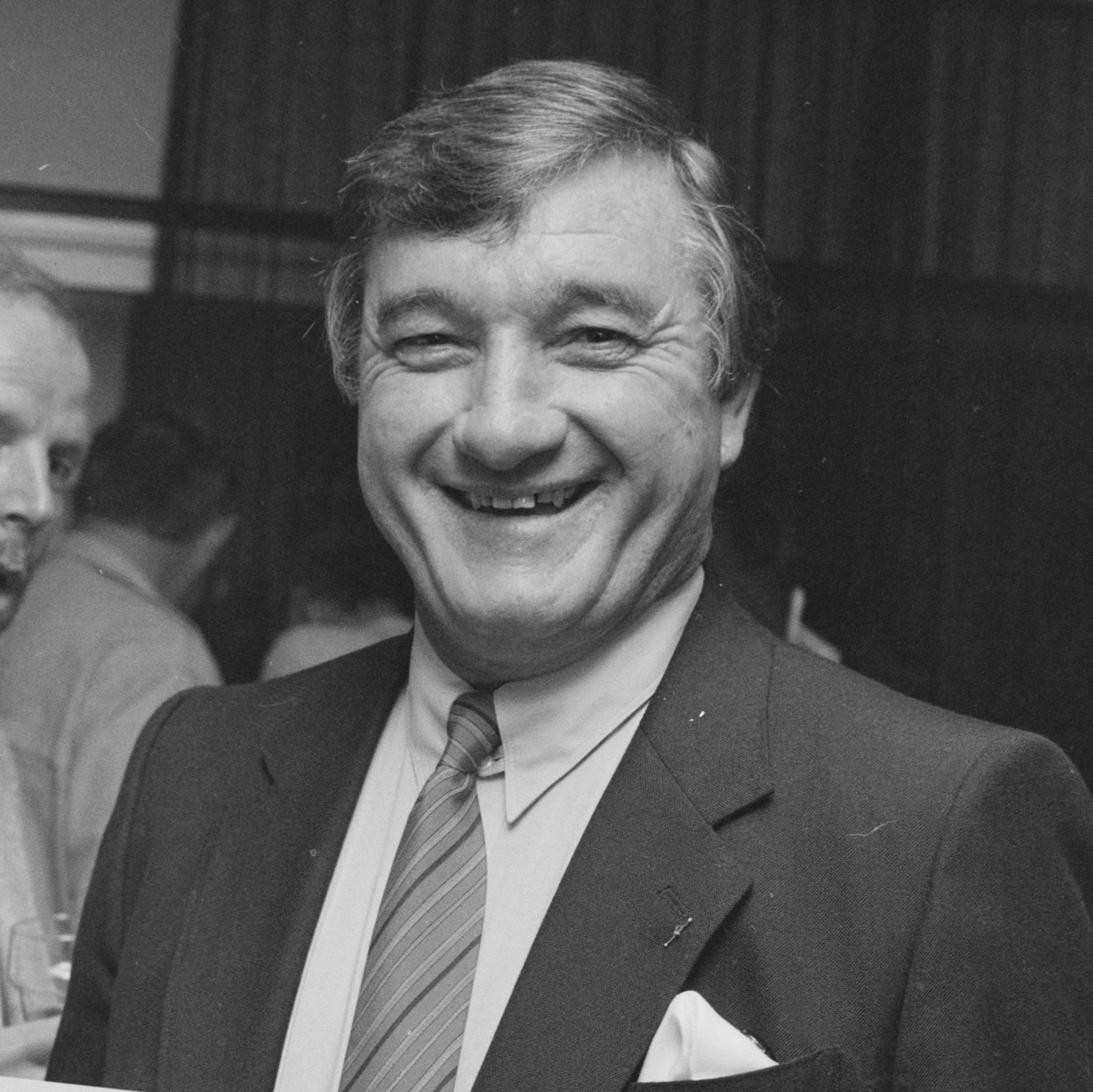
- Fraser in the Netherlands in 1985

Biographical details
- Born: June 25, 1933; Nutley, New Jersey, U.S.
- Died: January 20, 2013 (aged 79); Weston, Florida, U.S.
- Education: Florida State University

Coaching career (HC unless noted)
- 1963–1992: Miami Hurricanes

Head coaching record
- Overall: 1,271–438–9

Accomplishments and honors

Championships
- 2 College World Series (1982, 1985)
- College Baseball Hall of Fame; Inducted in 2006

Baseball career

Member of the Netherlands

Baseball Hall of Fame
- Induction: 1985
Medals
Men's baseball
Manager for United States
Amateur World Series
Gold medal – first place	1973 Managua	Team
Pan American Games
Silver medal – second place	1987 Indianapolis	Team
Manager for Netherlands
European Championship
Gold medal – first place	1960 Barcelona	Team
Gold medal – first place	1962 Amsterdam	Team
Gold medal – first place	1973 Haarlem	Team
Manager for West Germany
European Championship
Bronze medal – third place	1958 Amsterdam	Team

Ronald George Fraser (June 25, 1933 – January 20, 2013) was an American college baseball coach best known for his tenure at the University of Miami from 1963 to 1992. Nicknamed the "Wizard of College Baseball", he led the Miami Hurricanes baseball program to over 1,200 victories—his teams set an NCAA baseball record with playoff appearances in 20 consecutive seasons and won College World Series championships in 1982 and 1985.

Fraser managed the United States national baseball team on several occasions, including to its first ever world title at the 1973 Amateur World Series in Nicaragua and at the 1992 Summer Olympics. He also managed the Netherlands to two European championships in the 1960s.

== Early years ==
Born and raised in Nutley, New Jersey, Fraser was a three-sport letterman at Nutley High School where he graduated in 1953. He then attended Murray State College in Kentucky from 1953 to 1954. Later, he played baseball at Florida State University from 1954 to 1956 as a relief pitcher for the Florida State Seminoles baseball team. At Florida State, he joined Theta Chi. He graduated in 1960.

Fraser served in the United States Army for two years, during 1957 and 1958. He was stationed in Germany and the Netherlands.

== Managerial career ==
=== European baseball ===
During his time in Europe with the US Army, Fraser coached the West Germany national baseball team at the 1958 European Baseball Championship. He later went on to manage the Netherlands national baseball team from 1960 until 1963.

Fraser was hired as manager of the Dutch national team in 1960, replacing Henk Keulemans, becoming the team's second ever coach and first American coach. He led the team to two European championships, in 1960 and 1962. On one occasion, Fraser broke his leg while attempting to demonstrate a proper slide. Fraser left the Netherlands team in 1962 to take a coaching job with the University of Miami.

In 1972 and 1973, he returned to coach the Netherlands between college seasons, taking part in the 1972 Haarlem Baseball Week and winning another European title in 1973 in Haarlem. Fraser returned to the Netherlands a third time in 1980 when he participated in Haarlem Baseball Week with his Miami Hurricanes collegiate team, winning the tournament.

=== Miami Hurricanes ===
In 1963, Fraser took a head coaching job with the University of Miami, a school which did not offer its baseball players a scholarship. Even though the school did not begin to offer scholarships until 1973, Fraser built a program. Some of the people Fraser brought to visit the school to bring publicity to the program were Major League Baseball (MLB) Hall of Famers Ted Williams and Stan Musial, as well as announcer Joe Garagiola.

In 1973, Miami started a record streak of consecutive postseason appearances in college baseball; the streak continued for 20 seasons under Fraser, and ultimately lasted 44 seasons, finally ending in 2017. Also in 1973, Mark Light Stadium was built in large part to efforts by Fraser to build a privately funded stadium. In 1974, Miami was College World Series runner-up to the University of Southern California (USC), a perennial college baseball powerhouse.

The 1980s were a time of great change in Miami athletics. The Miami Hurricanes football team won championships in 1983, 1987 and 1989. While the success of Miami football seemed to eclipse much of the success of the baseball program, Miami won its first two College World Series in 1982 and 1985.

While opponents' fans often criticized Hurricane football fans for not selling out the Orange Bowl. Mark Light Stadium was almost always a full house for Hurricane baseball games and Fraser's Hurricanes drew 1.27 million fans in the 1980s, the best in college baseball.

Fraser was inducted to the Hurricanes' sports hall of fame in 1983, and the Ron Fraser Building, which houses the baseball offices at Mark Light Stadium, was named after him in 1986. Fraser retired as coach of Miami baseball at the end of the 1992 season.

=== 1992 Summer Olympics ===
Fraser coached the United States national baseball team at the 1992 Summer Olympics, which marked the first time that baseball was an official medal sport. The team, per Olympic rules at the time, was restricted to amateur players only. Fraser's 20-player squad of college baseball players included future major leaguers such as Jason Giambi, Nomar Garciaparra, and Jason Varitek. The team had a 5–2 record in pool play, then fell to Cuba in the semifinals, followed by a loss to Japan in the bronze-medal match.

== Later years ==
Fraser was inducted to the College Baseball Hall of Fame in 2006. He died on January 20, 2013, at his home in Weston, Florida, of complications from Alzheimer's disease.

== Head coaching record ==
Record table
Season	Team	Overall	Conference	Standing	Postseason
Miami (Independent) (1963–1992)
1963	Miami	18–9			
1964	Miami	20–9–1			
1965	Miami	23–12–1			
1966	Miami	19–18–1			
1967	Miami	23–15–1			
1968	Miami	27–11–1			
1969	Miami	31–11			
1970	Miami	28–15–1			
1971	Miami	35–11			NCAA District
1972	Miami	32–17			
1973	Miami	42–17			NCAA District
1974	Miami	51–11			College World Series Runner-up
1975	Miami	45–14			NCAA Regional
1976	Miami	41–15			NCAA Regional
1977	Miami	44–13			NCAA Regional
1978	Miami	50–12			College World Series
1979	Miami	55–11			College World Series
1980	Miami	59–12			College World Series
1981	Miami	61–10			College World Series
1982	Miami	55–17–1			College World Series champions
1983	Miami	61–21			NCAA Regional
1984	Miami	48–28			College World Series
1985	Miami	64–16			College World Series champions
1986	Miami	50–17			College World Series
1987	Miami	35–24–1			NCAA Regional
1988	Miami	52–14–1			College World Series
1989	Miami	49–18			College World Series
1990	Miami	52–13			NCAA Regional
1991	Miami	46–17			NCAA Regional
1992	Miami	55–10			College World Series
Miami:		1,271–438–9			
Total:		1,271–438–9			
National champion Postseason invitational champion Conference regular season champion Conference regular season and conference tournament champion Division regular season champion Division regular season and conference tournament champion Conference tournament champion

== See also ==
- List of college baseball career coaching wins leaders
- Miami Maniac
