= Royal Netherlands Baseball and Softball Federation =

Dutch sports governing body

- Koninklijke Nederlandse Baseball en Softball Bond
- Abbreviation: KNBSB
- Formation: 1912
- Type: International sport federation
- Purpose: Sport governing body
- Headquarters: Nieuwegein, Netherlands
- Members: 18,467 (2024)
- Official language: Dutch, English
- Chairman: Gregor Rossen
- Affiliations: WBSC Europe
- Budget: 1.7M EUR (2024)
- Website: knbsb.nl

The Royal Netherlands Baseball and Softball Federation (Dutch: Koninklijke Nederlandse Baseball en Softball Bond, KNBSB) is the national governing body of baseball and softball in the Netherlands. Baseball is widely played in the Netherlands but has struggled to become a major spectator sport due to the dominance of soccer, in which the Netherlands has always been one of the leading nations. School-aged children are generally encouraged to play soccer rather than baseball.

The precursor to the KNBSB, the Dutch Baseball Federation (Dutch: Nederlandsche Honkbal Bond) (NHB) was founded in 1912. The Royal Dutch Baseball Association was founded by Queen Juliana in 1952. The baseball and softball federations merged in 1971 to form the KNBSB. The KNBSB had 18,467 members and an annual budget of €1.7 million in 2024.

The national major league in the Netherlands, the Honkbal Hoofdklasse, was established in 1922. Notable Dutch baseball players include Hensley Meulens, Robert Eenhoorn, Andruw Jones, and Didi Gregorius.

The KNBSB gives out annual awards for both baseball and softball. Past winners include Gregorius, Xander Bogaerts, Greg Halman, Evert-Jan 't Hoen, and Saskia Kosterink. The KNBSB established a hall of fame, the first baseball hall of fame in Europe and first sport-specific hall of fame in the Netherlands, in 1983. The hall is part of the Dutch Baseball and Softball Museum at Pim Mulier Stadium in Haarlem.

== See also ==
- Baseball in the Netherlands
- Netherlands national baseball team
- Netherlands women's national softball team
- Baseball awards § Netherlands
