= Shuichi Murata =

Japanese baseball player (born 1980)

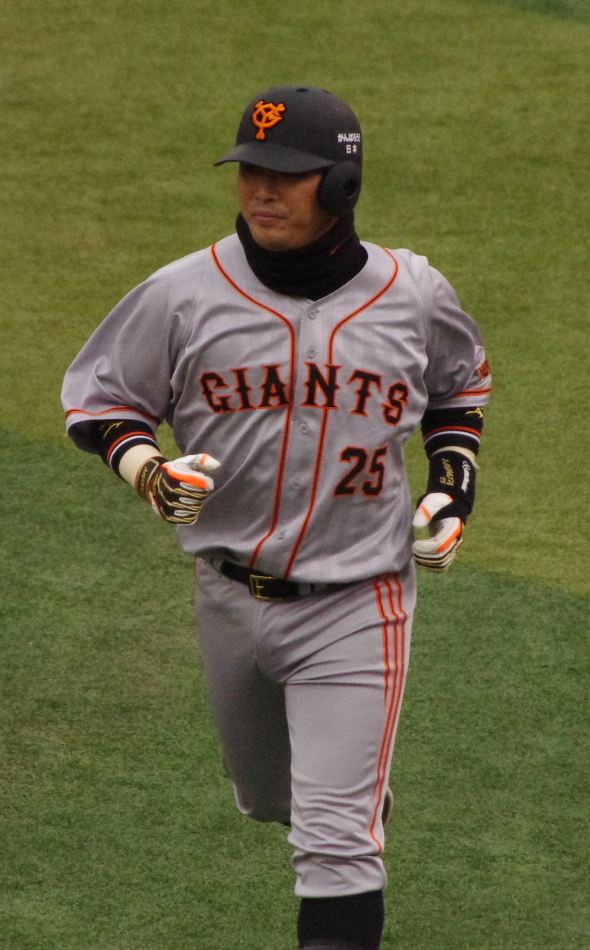
- Murata with the Yomiuri Giants

Yokohama DeNA BayStars – No. 71
- Third baseman / Coach
- Born: December 28, 1980 (age 45); Sasaguri, Fukuoka, Japan
- Batted: Right Threw: Right

NPB debut
- March 28, 2003, for the Yokohama BayStars

Last NPB appearance
- October 1, 2017, for the Yomiuri Giants

NPB statistics
- Batting average: .269
- Hits: 1,865
- Home runs: 360
- RBI: 1,123
- Stats at Baseball Reference

Teams
- As player: Yokohama BayStars (2003–2011); Yomiuri Giants (2012–2017); Tochigi Golden Braves (2018); As coach: Yomiuri Giants (2019–2022); Chiba Lotte Marines (2023–2024); Yokohama DeNA BayStars (2025–present)

Career highlights and awards
- 5× NPB All-Star (2006, 2008, 2011, 2012, 2014); 4× Central League Best Nine Award (2008, 2012, 2013, 2016); 3× Central League Golden Glove Award (2013, 2014, 2016); 2× Central League home run leader (2007, 2008)
Medals
Men's baseball
Representing Japan
World Baseball Classic
Gold medal – first place	2009 Los Angeles	Team
- Last updated on: November 9, 2024

Shuichi Murata (村田 修一, Murata Shūichi; born December 28, 1980) is a Japanese former professional baseball third baseman. He played 15 seasons in Nippon Professional Baseball (NPB) from 2003 to 2017 for the Yokohama BayStars and Yomiuri Giants.

Murata led the Central League in home runs in both 2007 and 2008 and is one of the few pure home run hitters in Japanese professional baseball today. He played in the 2008 Beijing Olympics as well as the 2009 World Baseball Classic as a member of the Japanese national team and hit cleanup for much of the latter tournament.

== Early life ==
Murata was born in Sasaguri, Fukuoka. He played for the Seto Bears, a local Little League team, in elementary school and for the Kasuya Phoenix in nearby Kasuya in junior high.

Murata went on to Higashi Fukuoka High School, leading the school to consecutive berths in national tournaments in his senior year (1998) as the team's ace pitcher. Armed with a 143 km/h (89 mph) fastball, Murata carried his team to a 5–0 victory over Izumo Hokuryo Senior High School in their first game in the 70th National High School Baseball Invitational Tournament (Higashi Fukuoka High's first-ever appearance in the spring tournament), but succumbed to Yokohama Senior High School in the next round, suffering a two-hit shutout at the hands of Daisuke Matsuzaka and giving up a home run to Taketoshi Gotoh. Though Murata's team secured a berth in the 80th National High School Baseball Championship held that very summer, they lost to a Katsuaki Furuki-led Toyota Otani High School in the first round.

Murata hit a total of 30 home runs during his high school career. Realizing that he "would never defeat Matsuzaka as long as [he] remained a pitcher", decided he would become a position player upon enrolling in college. Among Murata's teammates at the time were then-junior Kensuke Tanaka and catcher Ryuji Ohno.

As a player who was born in the 1980 Japanese academic year and participated in the 1998 Summer High School Baseball Championship, Murata is considered a member of the "Matsuzaka Generation".

== College career ==
Murata enrolled in Nihon University in Tokyo as an economics major alongside his high school batterymate Ohno and worked his way into the lineup as the team's starting third baseman, eventually developing into one of the league's more prominent sluggers.

In 2001, his junior year, Murata led his team to the finals of the All-Japan University Baseball Championship Series in June and was chosen to the Japanese team that would play in the 30th Japan-United States University Baseball Championship Series to be held later that month. He tied a Tohto University Baseball League record for most home runs in a single season (previously held by Tadahito Iguchi) with eight that fall.

Murata earned his second straight selection to the Japanese team prior to the 31st Japan-USA University Baseball Championship Series in the summer of his senior year (2002). He also played for the national team in the inaugural IBAF World University Baseball Championship held in Italy in August, contributing to the team's bronze medal finish.

Murata hit .275 with 103 hits (tied for sixth all-time), 20 home runs (tied for second all-time) and 70 RBI for his college career, winning the Tohto University Baseball League Best Nine Award four times. He was signed as a pre-draft pick prior to the 2002 NPB amateur draft held in the fall of his senior year by the Yokohama BayStars. Ohno, who had played alongside Murata throughout high school and college, was drafted in the fifth round of the draft by the Hawks (he retired in 2007). Other notable college players selected in the same draft include Tsuyoshi Wada and Nagisa Arakaki (Hawks), Katsuhiro Nagakawa (Hiroshima Toyo Carp), Hirotaka Egusa (Hanshin Tigers) and Gotoh and Chikara Onodera (Lions).

== Professional career ==
=== Yokohama BayStars ===
Murata made the ichigun (Japanese equivalent of "major league") roster in the spring of his rookie season in the pros, making his professional debut in the season opener against the Tigers on March 28, getting his first career hit then-Yomiuri Giants veteran Masumi Kuwata on April 1 and hitting his first home run off Giants left-hander Hisanori Takahashi the next day. His first career stolen base was a steal of home on a delayed double steal against the Carp on May 7.

In the first half of the season, Murata saw a significant amount of playing time at second base, despite having played third base almost exclusively during his college career, due to teammate Katsuaki Furuki's stronghold on third. He and Furuki started at their respective positions until June, with Murata being moved back to third when Furuki was converted to the outfield in the latter half of the season. He entered a slump in July and was sent down to the nigun team ("minor league" or "farm team"), but hit 10 home runs in September after being called up a second time, setting an NPB record for home runs hit in a single month by a rookie.

Though his campaign was cut short when he was hit by a pitch thrown by then-Yakult Swallows right-hander Katsutoshi Ishidoh on September 28, fracturing his right ulna, Murata finished with 25 home runs in just 104 games, good for sixth all-time in home runs hit as a rookie (he also finished with a batting average of just .224 and an on-base percentage of .303).

Murata began the 2004 season as the BayStars' starting third baseman and No. 5 hitter, but saw fewer starts as the season went on due to his spotty defense and abundance of strikeouts, with then-manager Daisuke Yamashita opting to use veteran Hitoshi Taneda or Seiichi Uchikawa at third base instead. He often hit in the 7-hole after the All-Star break, striking out less and improving on his on-base percentage but seeing a corresponding drop in his power numbers (home runs, slugging percentage).

Murata spent the majority of the 2005 season as the BayStars' No. 7 hitter. However, despite getting his first career walk-off hit off then-closer Masahide Kobayashi in an interleague game against the Chiba Lotte Marines on May 6, he struggled so much early on in the season that he even found himself slotted into the 9-hole for seven games during interleague play (in games hosted by Pacific League teams in which the designated hitter rule was employed). He used the lineup change as motivation, hitting a game-winning two-run homer off reliever Yasuhiko Yabuta in a game against the Marines on May 28. He hit his first career grand slam off Giants left-hander Tetsuya Utsumi on June 22, finishing the year with a .252 average, 24 home runs and 82 RBI.

Murata was chosen to the Nippon Professional Baseball All-Stars that would face the Japanese national team in the exhibition games preceding the inaugural World Baseball Classic in early 2006, hitting a three-run home run off Daisuke Matsuzaka in Game 2 to lead the All-Stars to a 4–3 upset victory over the national team.

It turned out to be a breakout year for Murata, who began the season in the 7-hole but moved up to the No. 5 spot after center fielder Hitoshi Tamura was removed from the active roster due to injury. He made the first start as cleanup hitter of his career on June 1 in a game against the Hawks as a replacement for slumping first baseman Takahiro Saeki, hitting the first walk-off home run of his career off then-Buffaloes reliever Jun Hagiwara on June 9 in the eleventh inning and following up the feat with his second such shot off Tokyo Yakult Swallows reliever Masao Kida on June 30 in the tenth inning. He remained in the cleanup spot until the end of the season, finishing with a .266 average, 34 homers and 114 RBI (all career highs) as one of the few consistent sources of offensive production on a team plagued by injuries all year. However, he also struck out 153 times, leading both Central and Pacific leagues in that category.

Murata was again named to the NPB All-Stars, this time to play in the Major League Baseball Japan All-Star Series, after the regular season. He batted cleanup in Game 4 and hit a solo home run off then-Anaheim Angels right-hander John Lackey in Game 5, going 4-for-15 (.267) with three RBI for the five-game series.

Murata continued to develop as a hitter in 2007, playing all 144 regular season games as the starting third baseman and cleanup hitter and hitting over 30 home runs and driving in over 100 RBI for the second straight year. He hit his 100th career home run off Swallows ace Masanori Ishikawa on April 10 and showed improvement in his plate discipline, cutting his strikeouts from 153 to 177 and marking career highs in both on-base and slugging percentage (.376 and .553, respectively). Murata's decision to use a heavier 950–960 g (34 oz) bat in the second half of the season after hitting just 13 home runs at the All-Star break was particularly effective, allowing him to hit 23 homers after the break alone. He passed then-Chunichi Dragons slugger Tyrone Woods, who had led him by eight homers at the end of August, and finished with 36 (one more than Swallows right fielder Aaron Guiel), leading the Central League in home runs for the first time in his career.

Murata played in the Asian Baseball Championship as a member of the Japanese national team that December, his first time playing on the national team.

Murata cemented his role as the team's cleanup hitter in 2008, hitting just .231 with six home runs in the month of April but heating up in May and reaching the 30-homer plateau by the end of July. He hit the third walk-off home run of his career off closer Alex Graman in the tenth inning of a game against the Saitama Seibu Lions on June 21 and homered in five straight games from July 15 to 19 against the Carp and Giants, garnering selection to the national team for the upcoming Beijing Olympics. Even though he missed two and a half weeks of the season due to the Olympics, Murata managed to reach 40 homers for the first time in his career on September 14.

Murata finished the season with a .323 average, 46 homers (a franchise record) and 114 RBI, hitting over .300 for the first time in his career and leading the league in home runs for the second straight year (finishing just one ahead of Giants slugger Alex Ramírez). He became the first Japanese-born player to lead the Central League in home runs in back-to-back seasons since Hiromitsu Ochiai accomplished the feat for the Dragons in 1990 and 1991 and also led the league in slugging percentage (.665) and on-base plus slugging (1.062). However, despite his offensive production, the BayStars finished dead last in the Central League with a 48–94 record, most likely playing a factor in Murata's finishing just seventh in Most Valuable Player voting and receiving only two first-place votes (Ramírez, who hit .319 with 45 homers and 125 RBI, won the award).

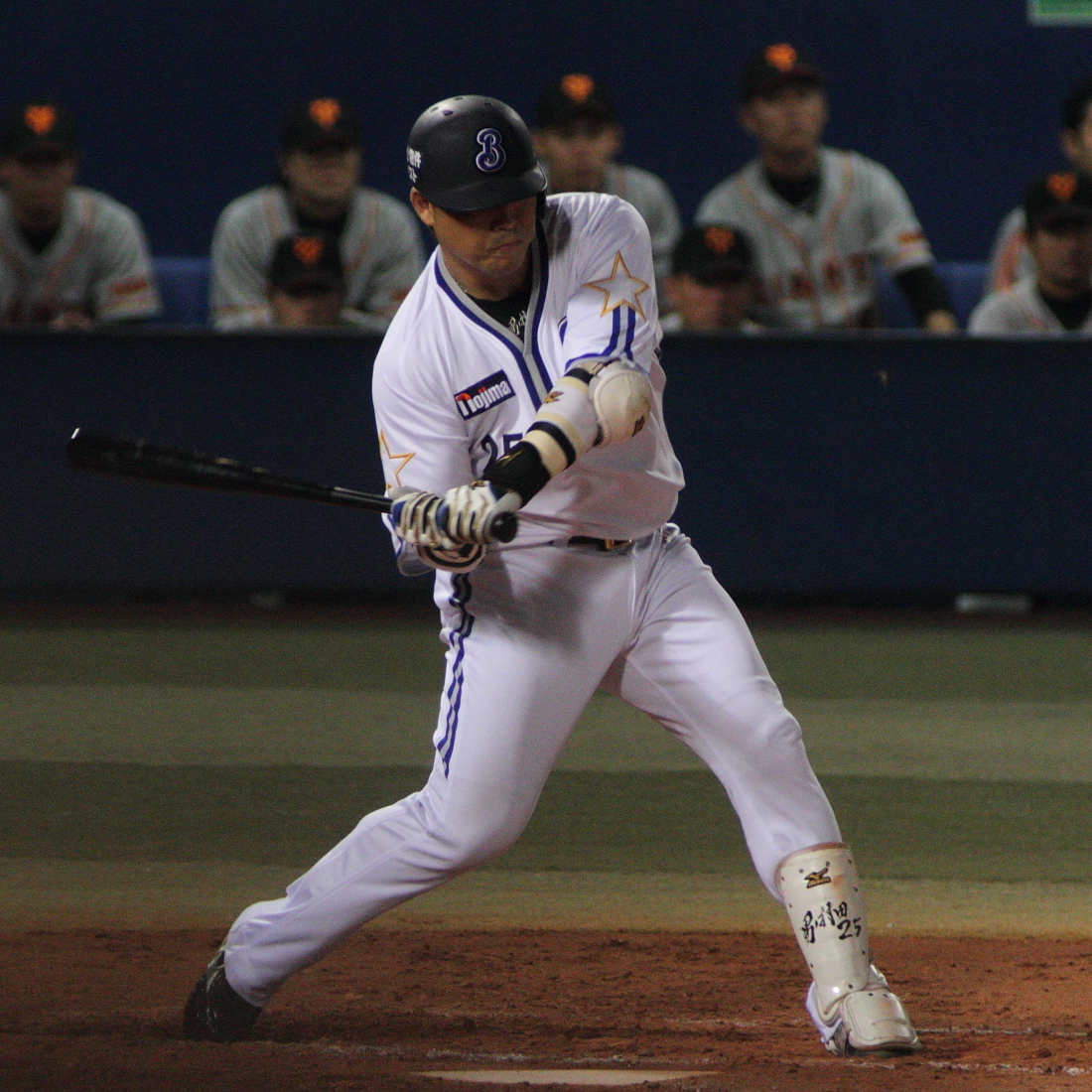
Murata batting for the Yokohama BayStars in 2010.

Murata began the 2009 season with the farm team, unable to play due to a torn left hamstring suffered while running the bases during the World Baseball Classic held in March. However, while it was initially reported that he would be out roughly six weeks and that his return to the active roster would be no earlier than May, Murata recovered from the injury sooner, playing in a minor league game against the Marines on April 15 (just two weeks after the season opener) as the designated hitter and homering in his first at-bat. He was added to the active roster and returned as the cleanup on April 21, getting his first hit of the season in a game against the Swallows on April 24 and his first home run off Tigers reliever Ryo Watanabe on April 29. He earned a walk-off hit by pitch against the Giants on May 13 in a 9–8 win. He hit his 200th career home run on July 28 against Tigers. On August 7, he tore his right hamstring after the game against the Chunichi Dragons; although he was expected to be sit out for the remaining season, he recovered again and managed to return to the starting lineup as the cleanup hitter in September 21's game against the Hanshin Tigers.

=== Yomiuri Giants ===
Murata played in 118 games for the Yomiuri Giants in 2017, slashing .263/.331/.423 with 14 home runs and 58 RBI. On December 2, 2017, he became a free agent.

=== Tochigi Golden Braves ===
On March 5, 2018, Murata signed with Tochigi Golden Braves of Baseball Challenge League.

On September 9, 2018, Murata announced his retirement from professional baseball.

== International career ==
=== 2007 Asian Baseball Championship ===
Murata's first stint with the Japanese national team came in the 2007 Asian Baseball Championship (which also functioned as the Asian qualifying tournament for the 2008 Beijing Olympics) held in Taichung, Taiwan. He went 4-for-9 (.444) in three games, helping Japan win the tournament and clinch a berth in the upcoming Olympic Games.

=== 2008 Beijing Olympics ===
Murata was chosen to play in the 2008 Beijing Olympics amidst high expectations for a Japanese national team that consisted entirely of professional players. However, he came down with a severe cold and had to be hospitalized in Tokyo in early August, keeping him from taking part in team practices prior to departing for Beijing and temporarily weakening his dynamic visual acuity. Japan's disappointing fourth-place finish behind South Korea, Cuba and the United States prompted sharp criticism of manager Senichi Hoshino by the Japanese media, who had opted to start Murata in eight of the team's nine games despite his clearly not being in good health and hitting just 2-for-23 (.087) with one double (55th of all 58 qualifying players in batting average) during the tournament.

=== 2009 World Baseball Classic ===
In early 2009, Murata was chosen to play in the World Baseball Classic as a member of the national team, his first opportunity to redeem himself after an abysmal showing in the Olympics the previous summer. He hit a two-run home run in Japan's 4–0 win over China on March 5 as the team's No. 5 hitter and another three-run homer in their 14–2 mercy rule clubbing of South Korea on March 7 as the cleanup hitter, hitting .320 and driving in seven runs in the first seven games of the tournament.

However, Murata injured himself while rounding first base in the fourth inning of Japan's seeding match against South Korea in the second round held in San Diego on March 19, tearing his right hamstring. Though Japan went on to become tournament champions in the final round played in Los Angeles, Murata was forced to return to Japan early. He was presented his gold medal by manager Tatsunori Hara upon the team's return to Tokyo on March 25.

== Coaching career ==
On November 5, 2024, Murata was hired by the Yokohama DeNA BayStars to serve as a coach.

== Playing style ==
=== Hitting ===
Listed at 177 cm (70 in) and 87 kg (192 lb), Murata is a stocky, if not particularly tall, hitter. While he fits the description of a prototypical power hitter in that he hits many home runs but also strikes out often, he is also well known for his exceptional opposite field power, a trait that Murata refers to as "pulling the ball to right field". While he left much to be desired in his plate discipline early in his career, he has improved his batting average as well as his on-base percentage virtually every season of his career and has developed into one of the most dangerous hitters in all of Japanese professional baseball.

=== Fielding ===
While Murata has a strong throwing arm and shows good instincts at third base, he leaves room for improvement on the defensive end. He has made strides in his glovework since coming into the league but is still prone to mistakes, leading the league in errors in both 2007 (18) and 2008 (16). Murata has seen time at both second and first base in the pros, playing 65 games at second in 2003, his rookie season, and one game at first in 2004. He played first base in the seeding match in the second round of the 2009 World Baseball Classic (Giants slugger Michihiro Ogasawara took his place after he was injured).

== See also ==
- List of top Nippon Professional Baseball home run hitters
- List of Nippon Professional Baseball players with 1,000 runs batted in
