= Takahiro Arai =

Japanese baseball player

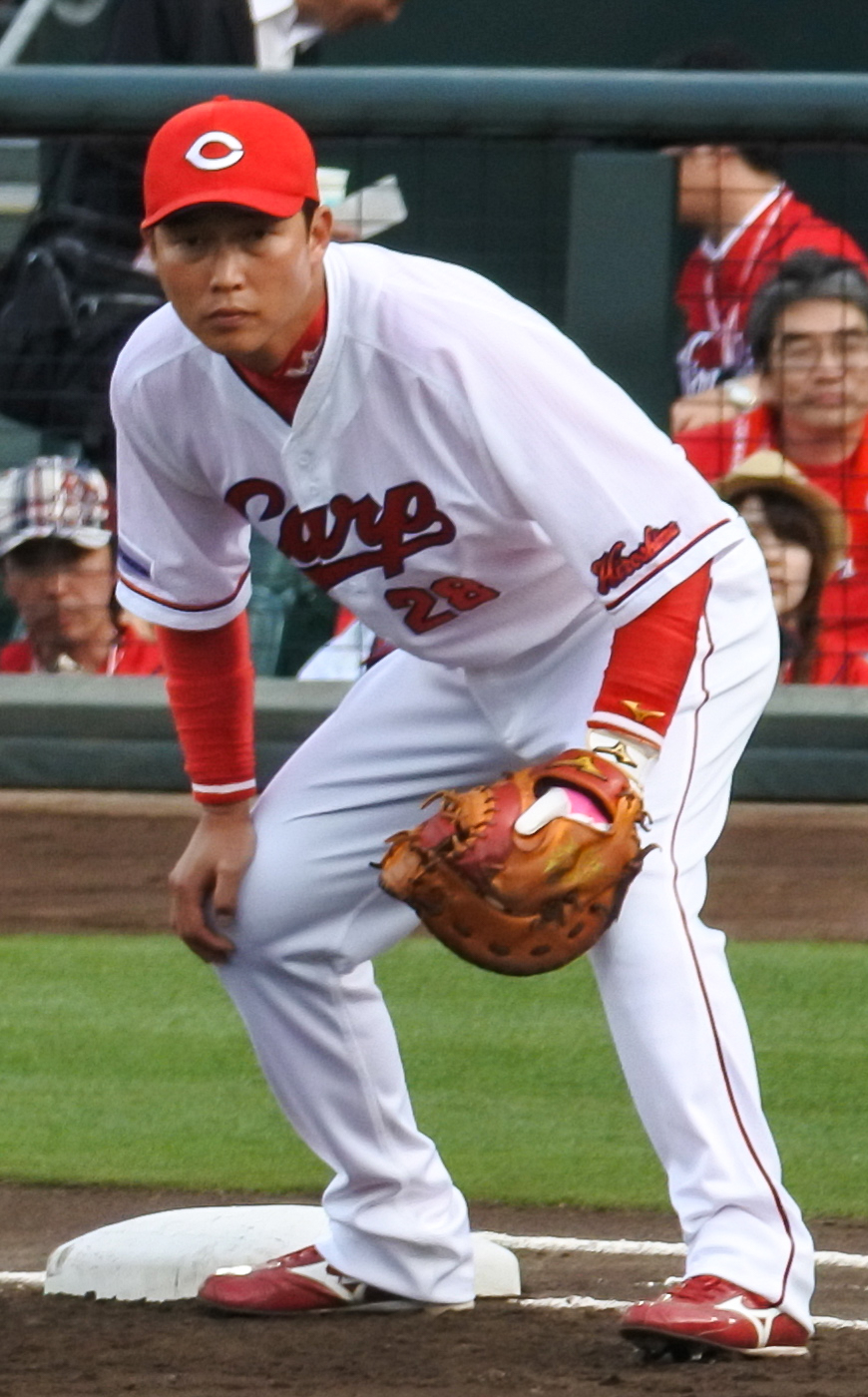
- Arai with the Hiroshima Toyo Carp

Hiroshima Toyo Carp – No. 25
- First baseman, Third baseman, Manager
- Born: Park Gwi-hong (박귀홍, 朴貴弘); January 30, 1977 (age 49); Hiroshima, Japan
- Batted: Right Threw: Right

NPB debut
- April 3, 1999, for the Hiroshima Toyo Carp

Last NPB appearance
- November 3, 2018, for the Hiroshima Toyo Carp

NPB statistics
- Batting average: .278
- Hits: 2,203
- Home runs: 319
- RBI: 1,303
- Stats at Baseball Reference

Teams
- As player: Hiroshima Toyo Carp (1999–2007); Hanshin Tigers (2008–2014); Hiroshima Toyo Carp (2015–2018); As manager: Hiroshima Toyo Carp (2023–present)

Career highlights and awards
- Central League MVP (2016); 8× All-Star (2002, 2005, 2007, 2008, 2013, 2015 - 2017); 1× Central League Leader of Home Run (2005); 1× Central League Leader of RBI (2011); 2× Central League Best Nine Award (2005, 2016); 1× Central League Golden Glove Award (2008); 1× NPB All-Star Game MVP (2013)
Medals
Men's baseball
Representing Japan
World Baseball Classic
Gold medal – first place	2006 San Diego	Team

Takahiro Arai (Japanese: 新井 貴浩, born January 30, 1977, in Naka-ku, Hiroshima) is a Japanese-Zainichi Korean former professional baseball player. He is the manager of Hiroshima Toyo Carp in Japan's Nippon Professional Baseball from the 2023 season.

His younger brother Ryota is also a former professional baseball player who played for Hanshin Tigers.

== College baseball career ==
In 1998, he participated in the Tohto University Baseball League and went 6 for 12 against an American collegiate All-Star team, winning him the league's RBI title. He only homered twice in college. He was drafted in the sixth round of the '98 NPB draft by the Hiroshima Carp, the team he had followed as a child.

== Professional career ==
=== Hiroshima Toyo Carp ===
In 1999, Arai hit .221/.288/.484 for Hiroshima, but homered 7 times in 95 AB. He was involved in two bone-head plays in one week. On September 14, he did not try to advance on a home run by Eddy Diaz because he thought it would be caught; Diaz passed him on the bases, resulting in an out. A week later, he lost count of the number of outs and threw away the ball after a double play, allowing a runner to score.

Seeing an increase in playing time in 2000, he batted .245/.318/.505 with 16 HR in 208 AB. In '01, he was up to .284/.363/.495 with 18 homers in 313 AB. Finally entering the regular lineup at age 25, he split his time between first base and third in 2002 and batted .287/.342/.514 with 28 homers. He was one homer behind Tomoaki Kanemoto for the team lead and made his first All-Star team. He also led the league with 17 errors.

In 2003, Takahiro slipped to .236/.299/402 with 19 HR and a league-high 16 times grounding into double plays, while striking out 120 times as the primary 1B. His playing time was cut back in '04 but he bounced back to .263/.340/.424. Before the 2005 season, he spent four days and three nights at a Buddhist temple to help his focus, adjusting his swing and improved drastically, putting up a .305/.353/.603 line with 91 runs, 43 homers, 94 RBI and 326 total bases. He moved to third primarily, switching spots with Kenjiro Nomura. He was second in the Central League in slugging (behind Kanemoto) and led the loop in home runs and errors (23). He homered in six straight games, tying Rick Lancellotti's club record. He made his second All-Star team and his first Best Nine (at first instead of third, as Makoto Imaoka was picked there). His brother Ryota was drafted that off-season.

In 2006, Arai hit .299/.336/.479 with 25 home runs and 100 RBI. He was 6th in the Central League in RBI, was third in sacrifice flies (9, one behind co-leaders Alex Ramirez and Shuichi Murata) and 10th in slugging. The next year, he batted .290/.351/.480 with 28 HR and 102 RBI. He tied Seung-yeop Lee for 6th in runs (84), tied Tyrone Woods for second in RBI (behind Ramirez), was 10th in home runs, third in strikeouts (136) and tied for second in double plays ground into (17), one behind Norihiro Nakamura.

=== Hanshin Tigers ===
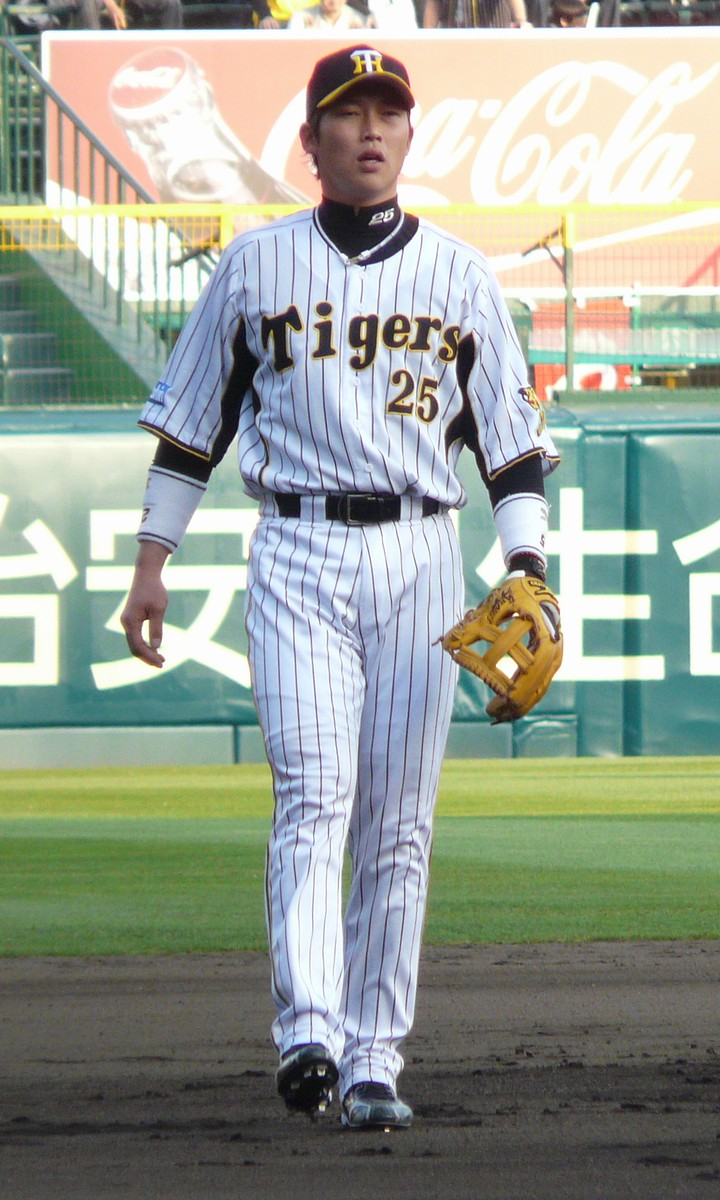
Arai playing for the Hanshin Tigers in 2009

Arai moved to the Hanshin Tigers as a free agent for the 2008 season and spent 7 years with club. At the end of the 2014 season, following a lackluster year that would see a decrease in his 2015 salary, Arai informed the Hanshin management of his intention to exercise his free agent rights, signaling the end of his time with the club.

=== Hiroshima Toyo Carp (second stint) ===
In November 2014, Arai signed a contract with Hiroshima Toyo Carp.

In 2016, Arai batted .300 with 19 home runs and 101 RBIs, contributing to the Carp's Central League title following a 25 years hiatus. He was chosen as MVP for the Central League.

== Coaching career ==
On October 12, 2022, Arai was announced as the manager of the Hiroshima Toyo Carp for the 2023 season.

The 2023 season will be the team's first year in office.led the team to a second-place finish in the league, eventually finishing 74-65.playoffs, although they were narrowly eliminated in the final stage.but finished the first year with a good leadership that could have almost won the championship.

== International career ==
=== 2006 World Baseball Classic/2007 Asian Championship ===
He played on Japan's team in the 2006 World Baseball Classic and went 1 for 3 with two strikeouts for the champion team. In the 2007 Asian Championship, Arai hit .500/.571/1.000 with 5 RBI in three games; he trailed tourney leader Chin-Feng Chen by one in RBI. Arai helped Japan win the title and clinch a spot in the 2008 Olympics with his performance.

=== 2008 Beijing Olympics ===
In the 2008 Olympics, he batted .257/.289/.486 with 2 triples and 7 RBI in 9 games as Japan's starting first baseman despite battling injury. His 2-run homer off of Suk-min Yoon broke a scoreless duel against South Korea in the 6th inning but the Japanese staff blew the lead. With Japan down 5–2 in the 9th, Arai tripled against closer Hitoki Iwase and Shuichi Murata doubled Arai home. Japan got no further in the loss. South Korea would go on to an unbeaten record in Beijing. Arai was 10th in the preliminary round in slugging (.563)

In the opening round, Arai's 6 RBI tied Nate Schierholtz, Atsunori Inaba, Matthew Brown, Alexeis Bell and Giorvis Duvergel for 4th, trailing Alfredo Despaigne, Dae-ho Lee and Michel Enríquez.

Arai became head of the Japan Professional Baseball Players Association in 2008, replacing Shinya Miyamoto.

== Personal life ==
He is Korean-Japanese who received his Japanese citizenship in 2004 and his Korean name is Park Gwi-ho (Korean: 박귀호)

== See also ==
- List of top Nippon Professional Baseball home run hitters
- List of Nippon Professional Baseball players with 1,000 runs batted in
- List of Nippon Professional Baseball career hits leaders
- Tomoaki Kanemoto
