= Tuffy Rhodes =

American baseball player (born 1968)

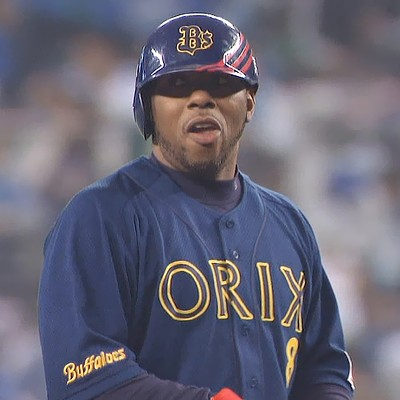
- Outfielder
- Born: August 21, 1968 (age 58); Cincinnati, Ohio, U.S.
- Batted: Left Threw: Left

Professional debut
- MLB: August 7, 1990, for the Houston Astros
- NPB: March 30, 1996, for the Kintetsu Buffaloes

Last appearance
- MLB: June 8, 1995, for the Boston Red Sox
- NPB: November 5, 2009, for the Orix Buffaloes

MLB statistics
- Batting average: .224
- Home runs: 13
- Runs batted in: 44

NPB statistics
- Batting average: .286
- Home runs: 464
- Runs batted in: 1,269
- Stats at Baseball Reference

Teams
- Houston Astros (1990–1993); Chicago Cubs (1993–1995); Boston Red Sox (1995); Kintetsu / Osaka Kintetsu Buffaloes (1996–2003); Yomiuri Giants (2004–2005); Orix Buffaloes (2007–2009)

Career highlights and awards
- 10× NPB All-Star (1997–2004, 2007, 2008); Pacific League MVP (2001); 7× Best Nine Award (1997, 1999, 2001–2004, 2008); 4× NPB home run leader (1999, 2001, 2003, 2004); 3× NPB RBI leader (1999, 2002, 2008)

Karl Derrick "Tuffy" Rhodes (born August 21, 1968) is an American former professional baseball player. He played six years in Major League Baseball and 13 years in Nippon Professional Baseball (NPB) in Japan. Rhodes is the all-time NPB home run leader among foreign-born players, and is 14th overall with 464 home runs in Japan. He hit 55 home runs in 2001, tying the then NPB single-season record set by Sadaharu Oh in 1964.

Rhodes holds the NPB record for most career ejections with 14, surpassing previous record holder Masaichi Kaneda who had eight.

== Early life ==
Rhodes was born in Cincinnati, Ohio. He acquired the nickname "Tuffy" as a six-year-old child after being hit in the face with a baseball and not crying. Rhodes attended Western Hills High School in Cincinnati.

== Career ==
Prior to Japan, he was a center fielder playing for the Houston Astros, Chicago Cubs and Boston Red Sox from 1990-1995.

In his major league career, Rhodes batted .224, with 13 home runs and 44 runs batted in, 74 runs scored and 14 stolen bases in 225 games played.

In 1993, he hit an extra-inning home run to win the American Association championship for the Iowa Cubs. His only season of more than 250 at bats came with the 1994 Cubs. In that season, Rhodes became the first National League player to hit three home runs on opening day when he connected off Dwight Gooden at Wrigley Field. In this game, Rhodes also became the first major leaguer ever to hit home runs in his first three at-bats of a season.

Granted free agency after the 1995 season, Rhodes signed with the Kintetsu Buffaloes in the Pacific League of NPB.

In the 2001 season, he hit his 55th homer to tie Sadaharu Oh's Japanese League single season home run record, set in 1964. (The current record is 60, set by Wladimir Balentien in 2013.) The following year, Alex Cabrera tied the record. Over 8 seasons with the Buffaloes, Rhodes hit 288 home runs for the team.

After eight one-year contracts with the Buffaloes, Rhodes wanted a multi-year contract with the team, but they refused to give him his contract. He was planning to sign with the Giants, and he only wanted Kintetsu to match the years, not the contract. He later found out that due to Kintetsu selling the club, they couldn't give him his multi year contract.

After Kintetsu refused to sign him to a multi-year contract, Rhodes signed a two-year deal with the Yomiuri Giants of the Japanese Central League in 2004. A successful first year was followed by a difficult second year. He left the team halfway through the 2005 season due to injury, and was released in the off-season.

In 2006, he tried to return to the major leagues with the Cincinnati Reds but was released by the team in spring training. He did not play again that season.

After spending the rest of 2006 with his family, however, he returned to Japan in 2007, signing a one-year contract with the Orix Buffaloes. After 10 seasons in NPB, Rhodes became just the second foreign player to accrue the required service time to no longer be counted as a foreign player for roster purposes, joining Tai-Yuan Kuo. In the past decade, Alex Ramírez and Alex Cabrera have also achieved the same classification.

Rhodes began the 2007 season with a bang by hitting a home run in his first game, and connecting for two more in the next game on two consecutive at bats. According to manager Terry Collins, Rhodes still had an 'explosive' bat. While the Buffaloes struggled to a last-place finish in 2007, and also not having any protection to speak of in the lineup, Rhodes' comeback was a spectacular one, batting .291 and hitting 42 home runs to go with 96 runs batted in.

The next season, teamed with fellow foreign-born slugger Alex Cabrera, Rhodes hit 40 home runs and drove in 118 runs. Combined, Cabrera and Rhodes, who earned the nickname "Caburo" late in the season, slammed 76 home runs and drove in 222 runs. Rhodes' 118 RBI also led the league as the Buffaloes made an improbable run to the playoffs, finishing second in the Pacific League and making their first playoff appearance since their 1996 Japan Series victory. However, the success did not last as the Buffaloes were swept in the short first-round of the Pacific League Climax Series by Yu Darvish and the more experienced Hokkaido Nippon Ham Fighters. Rhodes played for one more season with Orix before retiring at the end of the 2009 season.

In 2015, aged 46, Rhodes came out of retirement to become a player-coach for the Toyama GRN Thunderbirds of the Baseball Challenge League managed by former teammate Yuji Yoshioka. In 41 games he hit 5 home runs with 37 RBIs while slashing .315/.433/.493 (.926 OPS).

== See also ==
- List of top Nippon Professional Baseball home run hitters
- List of Nippon Professional Baseball players with 1,000 runs batted in
- American expatriate baseball players in Japan
