= Arito =

Arito is a surname. Notable people with the surname include:

- Michiyo Arito (born 1946), Japanese baseball player
- Motonaga Arito (born 2002), Japanese speed skater
