= Tomoaki Kanemoto =

Japanese baseball player and manager

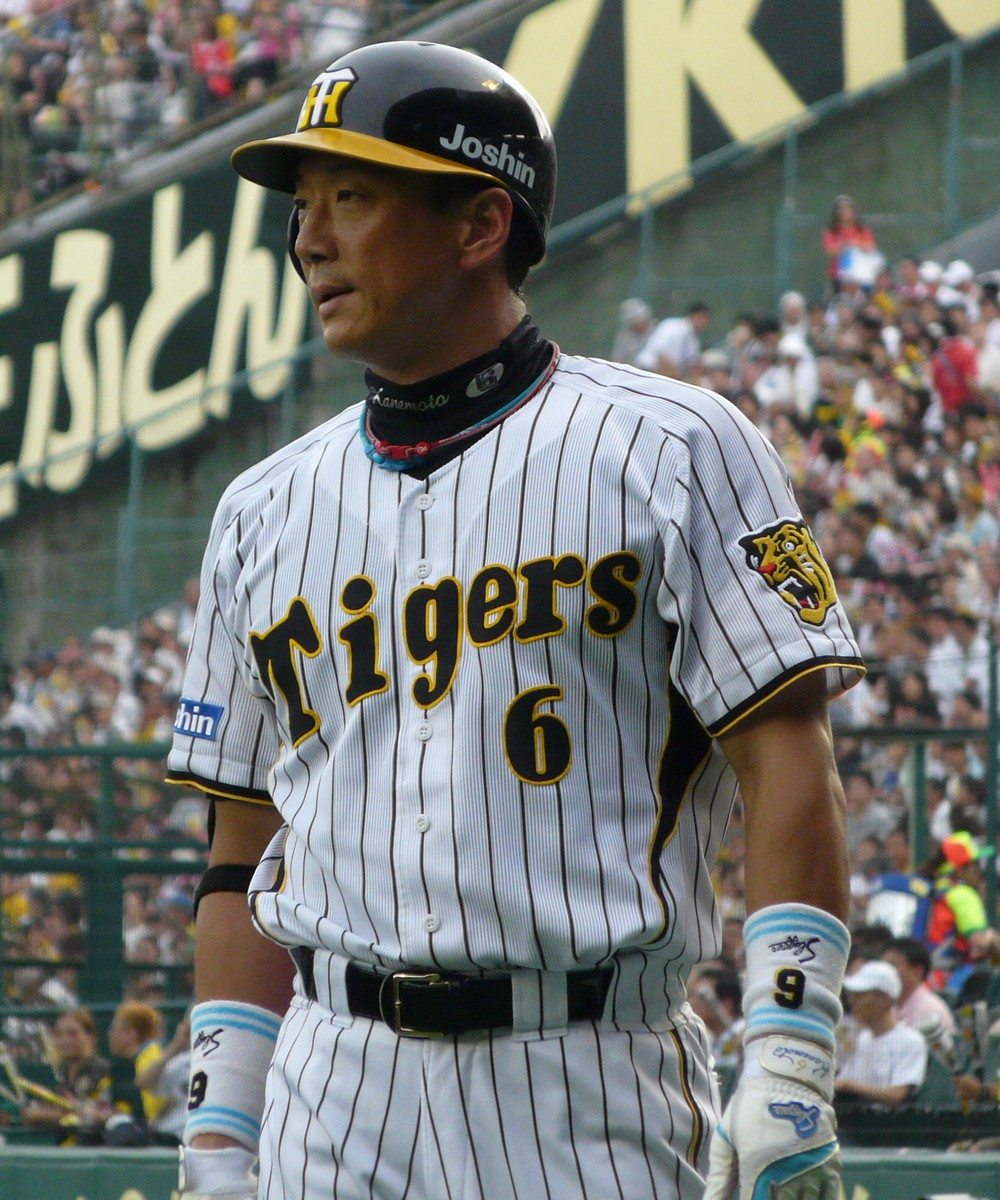
- Kanemoto with the Hanshin Tigers in 2008
- Left fielder / Manager
- Born: April 3, 1968 (age 58); Minami-ku, Hiroshima, Japan
- Batted: Left Threw: Right

NPB debut
- June 2, 1992, for the Hiroshima Toyo Carp

Last appearance
- October 9, 2012, for the Hanshin Tigers

NPB statistics
- Batting average: .285
- Hits: 2539
- Home runs: 476
- RBI: 1521
- Stats at Baseball Reference

Teams
- As player: Hiroshima Toyo Carp (1992–2002); Hanshin Tigers (2003–2012); As manager: Hanshin Tigers (2016–2018)

Career highlights and awards
- Central League MVP (2005); 7× Best Nine Award winner (1995, 2000–2001, 2004–2006, 2008); 10× NPB All-Star (1995–1997, 2000–2001, 2003–2006, 2008); 2× NPB All-Star Game Most Valuable Player (1996: Game 3, 2003: Game 2)

Member of the Japanese

Baseball Hall of Fame
- Induction: 2018
- Last updated on: January 16, 2018

Tomoaki Kanemoto (金本 知憲, Kanemoto Tomoaki; born April 3, 1968) is a Japanese former professional baseball outfielder and manager. In his career as a player he spent 11 years with the Hiroshima Carp before moving to the Hanshin Tigers in 2003, where he spent another 10 years. He holds the world record for consecutive games played without missing an inning (1492, ending on April 18, 2010) and consecutive innings (13686, ending on 9th inning on April 17).

The Tigers' former cleanup hitter, Kanemoto is regarded as one of the most accomplished hitters in Japanese professional baseball history. His 476 career home runs are the most by a left-handed hitter who throws right-handed and tenth overall on the all-time NPB list. Kanemoto retired as a player at the end of the 2012 season and rejoined the Tigers as their manager for the 2016 season, replacing Yutaka Wada. At the time of his retirement, Kanemoto was ninth on the all-time hit list for Japanese players across Japan and MLB. He is now 10th on the all-time list in both hits and home runs.

== Early life ==
Kanemoto was born in Minami-ku, Hiroshima, as a third-generation Korean who received his Japanese citizenship in 2001. He began playing baseball in the fourth grade for the Hiroshima Central Little League club, but quit the team after a year because he could not keep up during team practices. After playing both baseball and softball for various teams while attending junior high, Kanemoto enrolled in Koryo High School, where he became the team's cleanup hitter in his second year (the equivalent of eleventh grade in the United States) and played in the outfield as well as at third base and pitcher. Although Koryo High had a reputation as a baseball powerhouse, they failed to reach any national tournaments in Kanemoto's three years there. He hit 20 home runs during his high school career.

== College career ==
Kanemoto earned a spot in the starting lineup in his first year at Tohoku Fukushi University. His team, which consisted of notable players like pitchers Kazuhiro Sasaki and Takashi Saito, catcher Akihiro Yano, outfielder Koji Otsuka and shortstop/second baseman Chihiro Hamana, all of whom would later go on to the pros, earned berths in four consecutive All-Japan University Baseball Championship Series. (Kanemoto and Yano work together on the Tigers bench today.) Though they lost in the third round against Kinki University in the 38th annual tournament in 1989 (Kanemoto's sophomore year), they were the runners-up in the 37th and 39th tournaments (in 1988 and 1990, respectively), and won their first national title in the 40th annual tournament in 1991, Kanemoto's senior year.

Following the tournament, Kanemoto was chosen to play in the 20th U.S.–Japan Collegiate All-Star Baseball Games, sharing a room with then-Toyo University outfielder Shinjiro Hiyama, whom he would also later become teammates with upon joining the Tigers, during the series. Kanemoto was picked in the fourth round of the 1991 NPB draft by the Hiroshima Toyo Carp.

== Professional career ==
=== Early years: 1992–1995 ===
Kanemoto showed little promise in his first two seasons in the pros, falling behind as younger hitters like Tomonori Maeda and Akira Etoh began to make names for themselves at the ichigun (Japanese equivalent of "major league") level. He showed so little power that hitting coaches would tell him to try to slap the ball and use his speed to get on base more and earned the rather unflattering nickname "Mole Killer" for his habit of throwing the ball into the ground when trying to make a strong throw on the defensive end.

Frustrated by his shortcomings and realizing that he would be soon released from the team if he did not improve dramatically, Kanemoto began a rigorous weight training regimen and, with the help of then-coach Kazuyoshi Yamamoto, made his way into the starting lineup in the later half of the 1994 season, hitting 17 home runs that year. He continued to make strides with his bat in 1995, hitting .274 with 24 home runs (including his first career grand slam off then-Tigers left-hander Toshiro Yufune on August 10) and earning his first Best Nine Award.

=== 1996–2002 ===
Kanemoto hit over .300 for the first time in his career in 1996 as the Carp's No. 5 hitter, winning the Central League monthly Most Valuable Player award that September and hitting the first walk-off home run of his career off then-Swallows reliever Hiroto Kato on September 11. He added a career-high 33 home runs to the .300-plus average and drove in 82 RBI in 1997, but struggled in 1998, hitting just .253 with 21 homers and 74 RBI. However, he rebounded from the down year by hitting .293 with 34 home runs and 94 RBIs (both career highs) in 1999, playing in all 136 games and hitting for the cycle on April 24 against the Chunichi Dragons.

In 2000, Kanemoto was made the team's cleanup hitter by default after Etoh's departure for the Yomiuri Giants via free agency, and he responded by hitting .315 with 30 home runs and a career-high 30 stolen bases, becoming just the seventh player in NPB history to have a .300–30–30 (batting average, home runs, stolen bases) season. The following season (2001), he set a new Japanese professional baseball record by going 1002 consecutive plate appearances without grounding into a double play and drew 128 walks, the fifth-highest single-season total in NPB history and the most by any player other than Sadaharu Oh.

Kanemoto declared for free agency in the 2002 off-season. Despite recognizing that Kanemoto was an invaluable asset to the team, the low-budget Carp upheld their longtime policy of not pursuing any player of their own that opts to declare for free agency (an attempt by the Carp to hold down their payroll). After weeks of negotiations, Kanemoto eventually signed with the Central League rival Hanshin Tigers.

=== 2003 ===
For the 2003 season, Kanemoto was given the uniform number 6 and appointed the Tigers' new No. 3 hitter amidst hopes that he would change the very culture of the Tigers organization, a perennial cellar-dweller that had finished last in the Central League four times in the last five years. He committed himself to his new secondary role in the lineup, hitting just .289 with 19 home runs and 18 stolen bases but focusing on moving runners over and taking pitches so that teammate and fellow outfielder Norihiro Akahoshi could steal (he led the league with 61 stolen bases that year). Kanemoto played an integral role in leading the Tigers to their first league title in 18 years. In the Japan Series that followed the regular season, he hit four home runs, homering in three consecutive games and twice in one game (all three tying the previous Japan Series record). However, the Tigers lost to the Hawks four games to three, failing to win the championship.

=== 2004 ===
In 2004, Kanemoto returned to the cleanup spot following the appointment of new manager Akinobu Okada. He hit the fourth walk-off home run of his career off then-Dragons ace Kenshin Kawakami on May 8 in a classic 1–0 pitchers' duel. However, he was hit by a pitch by Dragons closer Hitoki Iwase on July 29, tearing the cartilage on his left wrist. While his streak of consecutive games played without missing an inning was thought to be in jeopardy, Kanemoto borrowed a lighter bat from teammate Teruyoshi Kuji and continued to play through the injury, setting a new Nippon Professional Baseball record of 701 on August 1. Despite such adversity, he put up some of his best numbers to date, hitting .317 with 34 home runs and a career-high 113 RBIs and leading the league in RBIs for the first time.

=== 2005 ===
Kanemoto began the 2005 season well, hitting .291 in the month of April and following it up by hitting .404 with eight home runs and 29 RBIs in May, earning his second career monthly MVP award. His walk-off home run (the fifth such home run of his career) off reliever Yusaku Iriki in an interleague game against the Hokkaido Nippon Ham Fighters on June 10 made him just the fourth player in NPB history to hit a home run against every team in both the Central and Pacific leagues. His home run on June 28 at Yonago Municipal Baseball Stadium gave him the distinction of having hit home runs in the most ballparks (32) of any active NPB player (Kazuhiro Yamauchi holds the all-time record with 39).

Kanemoto reached several notable milestones this year, playing in 1000 consecutive games on August 11 against the Dragons, recording his 1000th run scored on August 25 and his 1000th RBI on September 9 (both against the Carp). He also hit his 40th home run of the season on October 4, becoming the first Tigers player since Randy Bass in 1986 to hit 40 home runs in a season and the first since the "Lucky Zone", the short porch in right field, was removed from Koshien Stadium. Kanemoto finished the year with career highs in every Triple Crown category, hitting .327 with 40 homers and 125 RBIs and leading the league in runs scored (120), total bases (344), slugging percentage (.615) and OPS (1.044) at the age of 37. He led the Tigers to another league titles and was voted the Central League Most Valuable Player for the first time in his career.

=== 2006 ===
Kanemoto broke the world record held by Cal Ripken Jr. for consecutive innings played of 8243 on March 31 2006, and set a new world record for consecutive games played without missing an inning with 904 on April 9 in a game against the Yokohama BayStars (the previous record was also held by Ripken). He reached his milestone 1000th consecutive game played without missing an inning on August 15 against the BayStars, finishing the season with a .303 average, 26 home runs and 98 RBI.

=== 2007 ===
Kanemoto had somewhat of a down year in 2007, putting up 31 homers and 95 RBIs but batting just .265 and recording his lowest OPS (.843) since 1998. That the Tigers finished last in the NPB in team batting average and runs scored might also have been a contributing factor to the media's criticism of Kanemoto. As he chose to play through a meniscus tear to his left knee (a season-ending injury for many players), slowing him down both in the field and on the basepaths, some even alleged that Kanemoto was just "playing for his [consecutive games] streak" and that he was "hurting the team by continuing to play in such conditions" by taking playing time away from some of the Tigers' younger players. He underwent surgery on his left knee for the first time in his life in October.

=== 2008 ===
Kanemoto recorded his 1999th career hit on April 6 2008, but did not get his 2000th hit (the 37th player to accomplish the feat in Japanese professional baseball history) until April 12 in a game against the BayStars. His hitless stretch of three games and 15 at-bats between his 1999th and 2000th career hit was an NPB record. (Incidentally, teammate Takahiro Arai, who played with Kanemoto on both the Carp and the Tigers, got his 1000th career hit in the same game.) He won his third monthly MVP award that June, hitting .413 with six home runs and 20 RBI. Though the Tigers narrowly lost the pennant race to the rival Giants, Kanemoto finished the season with a .307 average, 27 home runs and 108 RBI, bouncing back from a disappointing 2007 campaign. He underwent surgery on his knee for the second straight year during the off-season.

=== 2009 ===
Despite having to sit out virtually all of Spring training due to rehab of his left knee, Kanemoto went on a torrid streak to begin the 2009 season, hitting .521 with eight home runs and 25 RBIs and slugging 1.146 through the first twelve games of the season. He homered in the Tigers' season opener against the Swallows on April 3, his 41st birthday, and hit three home runs in a game for the first time in his career on April 8 against the Carp, making history when he repeated the feat on April 10 against the Giants and became the first player in NPB history to homer in three consecutive plate appearances twice in the same month. Though he cooled down after his initial streak, he hit .379 with eight homers and 30 RBIs in April, setting a career high for RBIs in a single month, leading the Central League in all three Triple Crown categories and winning his fourth monthly MVP award. He also had three walk-off hits early in the season, a two-run double off Carp closer Katsuhiro Nagakawa on April 7, an RBI single off BayStars reliever Yuya Ishii on April 30, and a walk-off home run off Carp reliever Ryuji Yokoyama on May 12, the Tigers' 7000th franchise home run.

== Career statistics ==
Nippon Professional Baseball
Year	Age	Team	G	AB	R	H	2B	3B	HR	TB	RBI	SB	AVG	OBP	SLG	OPS
1992	24	Hiroshima	5	3	1	0	0	0	0	0	0	0	.000	.250	.000	.250
1993	25	Hiroshima	42	89	9	17	3	0	4	32	9	0	.191	.242	.360	.602
1994	26	Hiroshima	90	257	41	69	14	2	17	138	43	2	.268	.345	.537	.882
1995	27	Hiroshima	104	369	72	101	15	1	24	190	67	14	.274	.381	.512	.896
1996	28	Hiroshima	126	423	84	127	18	2	27	230	72	18	.300	.407	.544	.951
1997	29	Hiroshima	133	465	77	140	17	2	33	260	82	13	.301	.404	.559	.963
1998	30	Hiroshima	133	499	77	126	33	3	21	228	74	9	.253	.347	.457	.804
1999	31	Hiroshima	**135**	502	84	147	21	2	34	274	94	10	.293	.382	.546	.928
2000	32	Hiroshima	**136**	496	96	156	20	2	30	270	90	30	.315	.415	.544	.959
2001	33	Hiroshima	**140**	472	101	148	28	1	25	253	93	19	.314	.463	.536	.999
2002	34	Hiroshima	**140**	540	80	148	30	2	29	269	84	8	.274	.348	.498	.846
2003	35	Hanshin	**140**	532	94	154	24	2	19	239	77	18	.289	.399	.449	.848
2004	36	Hanshin	**138**	521	92	165	32	4	34	307	**113**	5	.317	.406	.589	.995
2005	37	Hanshin	**146**	559	**120**	183	35	3	40	**344**	125	3	.327	.429	**.615**	**1,044**
2006	38	Hanshin	**146**	545	85	165	24	4	26	275	98	2	.303	.393	.505	.897
2007	39	Hanshin	**144**	533	74	141	17	3	31	257	95	1	.265	.361	.482	.843
2008	40	Hanshin	**144**	535	87	164	33	2	27	282	108	2	.307	.392	.527	.919
2009	41	Hanshin	**144**	518	66	135	37	0	21	235	91	8	.261	.368	.454	.822
2010	42	Hanshin	**144**	353	39	85	12	0	16	145	45	1	.241	.321	.411	.732
2011	43	Hanshin	122	348	27	76	11	1	12	125	31	1	.218	.269	.359	.628
2012	44	Hanshin	126	356	24	92	16	1	6	128	30	3	.258	.347	.360	.707
**Career**			**2578**	**8915**	**1430**	**2539**	**440**	**37**	**476**	**4481**	**1521**	**167**	**.285**	**.382**	**.503**	**.884**

Bold indicates league leader

== See also ==
- List of top Nippon Professional Baseball home run hitters
- List of Nippon Professional Baseball career hits leaders
- List of Nippon Professional Baseball players with 1,000 runs batted in
