= List of top Nippon Professional Baseball home run hitters =

This is a list of the top 40 Nippon Professional Baseball home run hitters. In the sport of baseball, a home run is a hit in which the batter scores by circling all the bases and reaching home plate in one play, without the benefit of a fielding error. This can be accomplished either by hitting the ball out of play while it is still in fair territory (a conventional home run), or by an inside-the-park home run. Sadaharu Oh holds the Nippon Professional Baseball home run record (as well as the world lifetime home run record) with 868. He passed Hank Aaron (who is currently second on the Major League Baseball career home run list) with 755, on September 3, 1977. The only other NPB player to have hit 600 or even more home runs is Katsuya Nomura with 657. Slugger Noboru Aota retired in 1959 as the Japanese professional baseball career leader with 265 career homers. He was surpassed in 1963 by Kazuhiro Yamauchi, the first Japanese professional baseball player to hit 300 home runs. (Yamauchi finished his career with 396 home runs.) Sadaharu Oh assumed the top spot in 1968, later becoming the first NPB hitter to surpass 600 home runs during the 1974 season. Listed are all Nippon Professional Baseball players with 300 or more home runs hit during official regular season (i.e., excluding playoffs or exhibition games). Players in bold face are active as of the 2026 Nippon Professional Baseball season (including free agents).

== List ==
*	denotes elected to Japanese Baseball Hall of Fame.
Bold	denotes active player. (Note: A player is considered inactive if he has announced his retirement or not played for a full season.)

Stats updated as of 2026 season.

Rank	Player (2026 HRs)	HR	Years
1	Sadaharu Oh *	868	1959–1980
2	Katsuya Nomura *	657	1954–1980
3	Hiromitsu Kadota *	567	1970–1992
4	Koji Yamamoto *	536	1969–1986
5	Kazuhiro Kiyohara	525	1985–2008
6	Hiromitsu Ochiai *	510	1979–1998
7	Isao Harimoto *	504	1959–1981
8	Sachio Kinugasa *	504	1965–1987
9	Katsuo Osugi *	486	1965–1983
10	**Takeya Nakamura**	482	2003–present
11	Tomoaki Kanemoto *	476	1992–2012
12	Kōichi Tabuchi	474	1969–1984
13	Masahiro Doi	465	1962–1981
14	Tuffy Rhodes	464	1996–2005, 2007–2009
15	Shigeo Nagashima *	444	1958–1974
16	Koji Akiyama *	437	1981, 1984–2002
17	Hiroki Kokubo	413	1994–2012
18	Shinnosuke Abe	406	2001–2019
19	Norihiro Nakamura	404	1992–2014
20	Takeshi Yamasaki	403	1989–2013
21	Kazuhiro Yamauchi *	396	1952–1970
22	Tatsunori Hara	382	1981–1995
22	Yasunori Oshima	382	1971–1994
24	Alex Ramírez *	380	2001–2013
25	Michihiro Ogasawara	378	1997–2015
26	Shinichi Eto *	367	1959–1976
27	Akira Eto	364	1990–2009
28	Shuichi Murata	360	2003–2017
29	Alex Cabrera	357	2001–2012
30	Nobuhiko Matsunaka	352	1997–2015
31	Masayuki Kakefu	349	1974–1988
32	Michiyo Arito	348	1969–1986
33	Hideji Katō	347	1969–1987
34	Tokuji Nagaike	338	1966–1979
34	Masaru Uno	338	1977–1994
36	Hideki Matsui *	332	1993–2002
37	Makoto Matsubara	331	1962–1981
38	Yoshinobu Takahashi	321	1998–2015
39	Kazuhiro Wada	319	1997–2015
39	Takahiro Arai	319	1999–2018
40	**Hideto Asamura**	315	2010–present
41	**Tetsuto Yamada**	313	2012–present
42	Sho Nakata	309	2009–2025
43	Katsumi Hirosawa	306	1985–2003
44	Takahiro Ikeyama	304	1984–2002
45	**Hayato Sakamoto**	303	2007–present
46	Nobuhiro Matsuda	301	2006–2023
46	Wladimir Balentien	301	2011–2021

== See also ==
- List of Major League Baseball career home run leaders
- List of Nippon Professional Baseball players with 1,000 runs batted in
- List of Nippon Professional Baseball career hits leaders
- List of Nippon Professional Baseball earned run average champions
- Nippon Professional Baseball Most Valuable Player Award
