= Hideji Katō =

Japanese baseball player (born 1948)

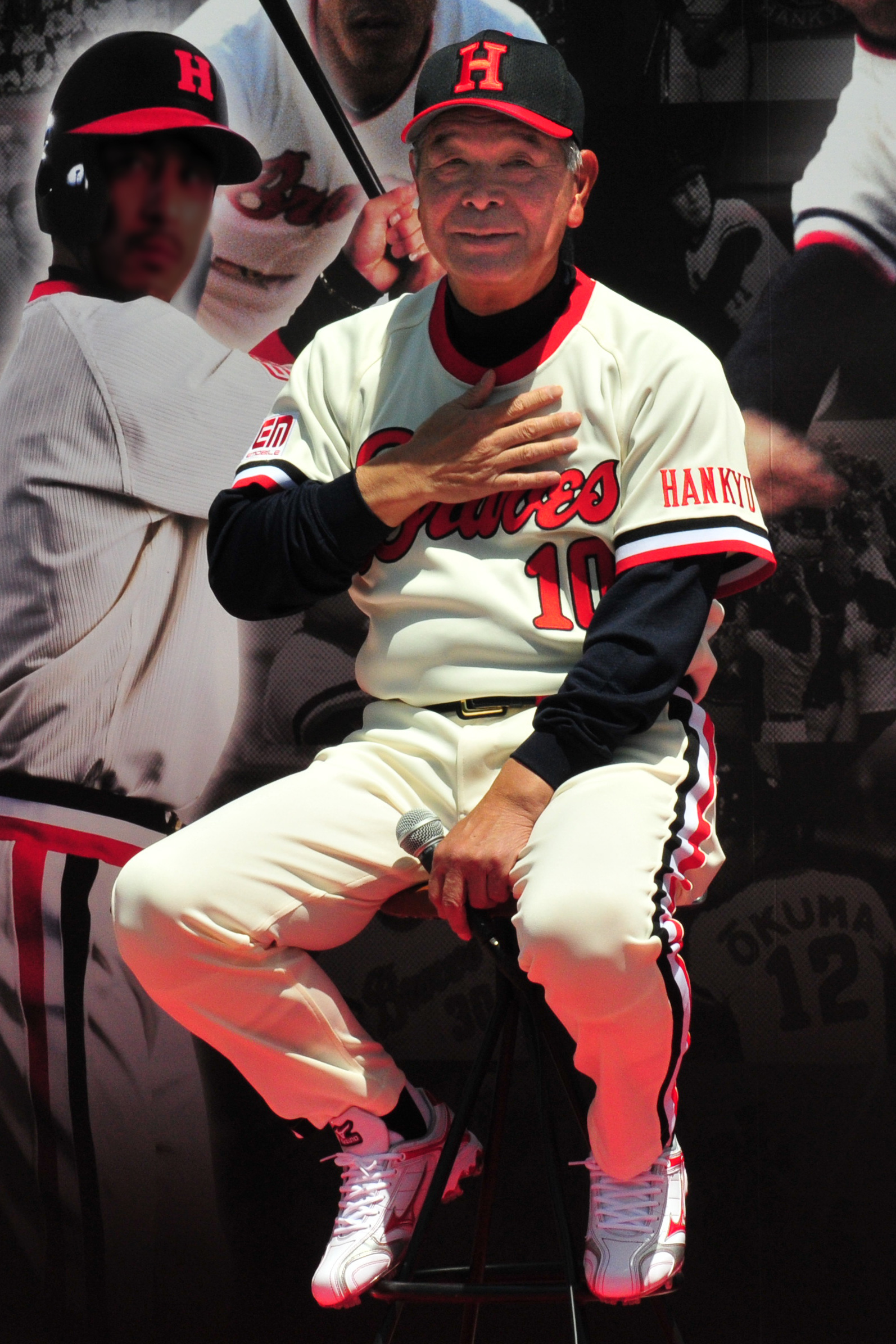
- First baseman / Coach
- Born: May 24, 1948 (age 78); Haibara District, Shizuoka, Japan
- Batted: Left Threw: Left

debut
- 1969, for the Hankyu Braves

Last appearance
- 1987, for the Nankai Hawks

Career statistics
- Batting average: .297
- Home runs: 347
- Hits: 2,055
- Runs batted in: 1,268
- Stats at Baseball Reference

Teams
- Hankyu Braves (1969–1982); Hiroshima Toyo Carp (1983); Kintetsu Buffaloes (1984–1985); Yomiuri Giants (1986); Nankai Hawks (1987)

Career highlights and awards
- Pacific League MVP (1975)

Hideji Katō (加藤 秀司, Katō Hideji) (born May 24, 1948) is a Japanese former professional baseball first baseman in Nippon Professional Baseball. He played for the Hankyu Braves from 1969 to 1982, Hiroshima Toyo Carp in 1983, Kintetsu Buffaloes from 1984 to 1985, Yomiuri Giants in 1986 and the Nankai Hawks in 1987. He was the Pacific League MVP in 1975.

== See also ==
- List of top Nippon Professional Baseball home run hitters
- List of Nippon Professional Baseball players with 1,000 runs batted in
- List of Nippon Professional Baseball career hits leaders
