= Yasunori Oshima =

Japanese baseball player and manager (1950–2021)

- Outfielder / First baseman / Third baseman
- Born: October 16, 1950; Nakatsu, Ōita, Japan
- Died: June 30, 2021 (aged 70)
- Batted: Right Threw: Right

NPB debut
- June 17, 1971, for the Chunichi Dragons

Last NPB appearance
- September 28, 1994, for the Nippon Ham Fighters

NPB statistics
- Batting average: .272
- Home runs: 382
- Hits: 2,204
- Runs batted in: 1,234
- Stats at Baseball Reference

Teams
- As player: Chunichi Dragons (1969–1987); Nippon Ham Fighters (1988–1994); As manager: Nippon Ham Fighters (2000–2002)

Career highlights and awards
- 1983 CL home run leader

Yasunori Oshima (大島 康徳, Ōshima Yasunori; October 16, 1950 – June 30, 2021) was a Japanese professional baseball outfielder, first baseman and third baseman, and coach in Nippon Professional Baseball (NPB). He played for the Chunichi Dragons and Nippon Ham Fighters from 1971 to 1994. He went on to manage the Fighters from 2000 to 2002, and served as the hitting coach for the Japan national baseball team during the 2006 World Baseball Classic.

== Early life ==
Oshima was born in Ōita Prefecture on October 16, 1950. He attended Nakatsu Kogyo High School. He was drafted by the Chunichi Dragons in the third round of the 1968 draft.

== Professional career ==
=== Playing ===
Oshima made his NPB debut with the Dragons in 1971. He won two Central League pennants with the team. His best year came in 1979, when he recorded a career-high batting average of .317, and had the most hits in the league with 159. He also hit 36 home runs that year, the most in his career, but finished behind Masayuki Kakefu (who hit 48) as the league leader in home runs. Four seasons later, Oshima led the league in home runs with 36. He joined the Nippon Ham Fighters in 1988, finishing his NPB career with the team in 1994. He played 2,638 games over his 24-year career, amassing 2,204 hits, 382 home runs, and 1,234 runs batted in.

=== Coaching ===
Oshima became manager of the Fighters in 2000. He recorded his only winning season that same year, with the team finishing 69–65. Overall, he had a 181–225 record in his three seasons with the team. He later became the hitting coach of the Japan national baseball team for the 2006 World Baseball Classic, the first edition of the tournament which the Japanese team won.

== Later life ==
Oshima was inducted into the Meikyukai. He disclosed in February 2017 that he had colon cancer. He nonetheless continued working as a baseball commentator and also blogged about his fight against the disease. Oshima died on June 30, 2021, at the age of 70.

== See also ==
- List of top Nippon Professional Baseball home run hitters
- List of Nippon Professional Baseball players with 1,000 runs batted in
- List of Nippon Professional Baseball career hits leaders
