= Makoto Matsubara =

Japanese baseball player (born 1944)

- First baseman / Third baseman
- Born: January 13, 1944 (age 82); Iruma, Saitama, Japan
- Batted: Right Threw: Right

debut
- 1962, for the Taiyo Whales

Last appearance
- 1981, for the Yomiuri Giants

Career statistics
- Batting average: .276
- Home runs: 331
- Hits: 2,095
- Runs batted in: 1,180
- Stats at Baseball Reference

Teams
- As player: Taiyo Whales / Yokohama Taiyo Whales (1962–1980); Yomiuri Giants (1981); As coach: Yokohama Taiyo Whales (1982–1984); Yomiuri Giants (1985–1991); Hiroshima Toyo Carp (2001–2003); Yokohama BayStars (2004)

Makoto Matsubara (松原 誠, Matsubara Makoto; born January 13, 1944 in the Saitama Prefecture, Iruma, Japan) is a Japanese former professional baseball first baseman and third baseman in Nippon Professional Baseball (NPB). He played for the Taiyo Whales / Yokohama Taiyo Whales from 1962 to 1980 and the Yomiuri Giants in 1981.

== See also ==
- List of top Nippon Professional Baseball home run hitters
- List of Nippon Professional Baseball players with 1,000 runs batted in
- List of Nippon Professional Baseball career hits leaders
