= Alex Ramírez =

Venezuelan baseball player (born 1974)

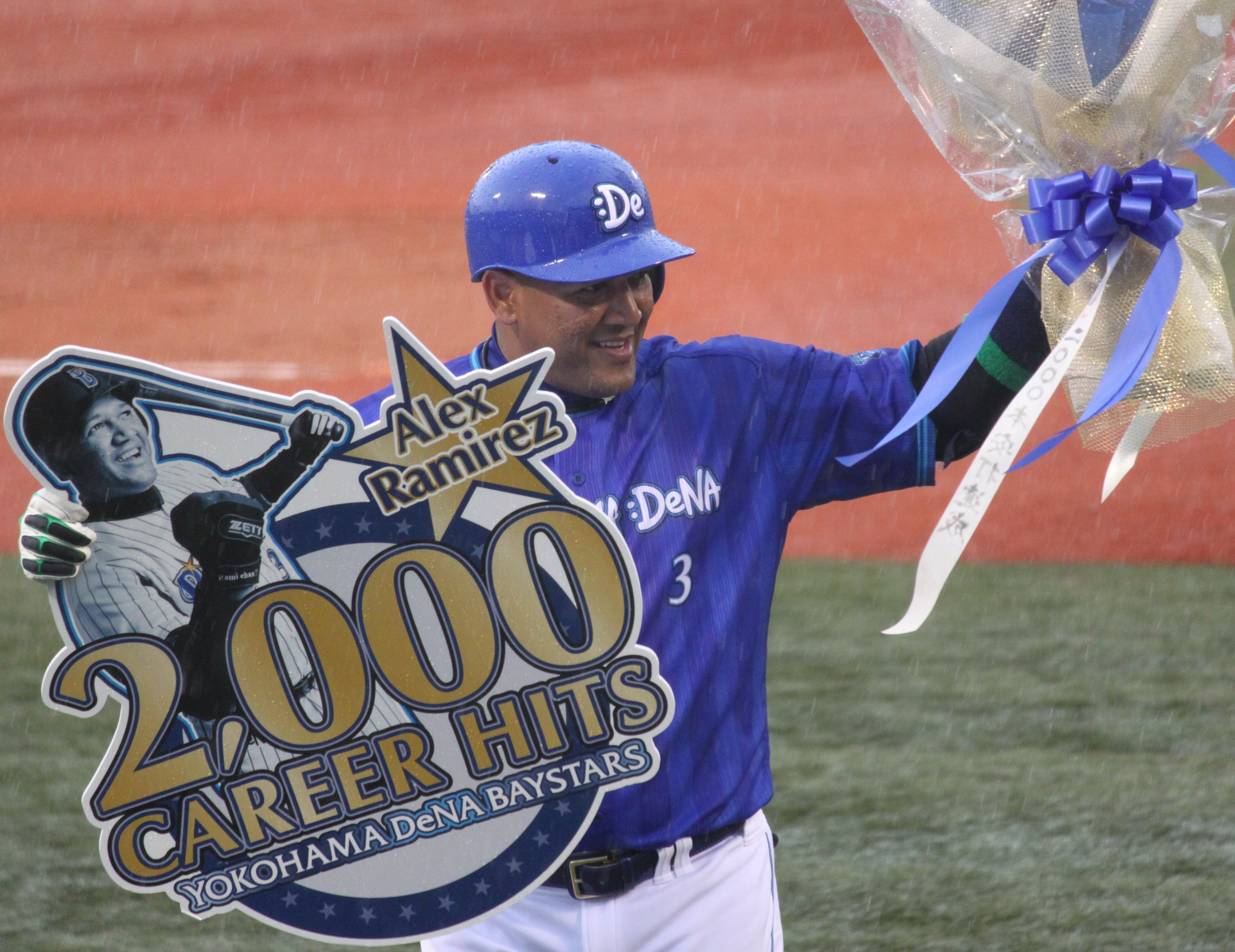
- Ramirez celebrating his 2000 career hits in 2013
- Outfielder / Manager
- Born: 3 October 1974 (age 52); Caracas, Venezuela
- Batted: Right Threw: Right

Professional debut
- MLB: 19 September, 1998, for the Cleveland Indians
- NPB: 30 March, 2001, for the Yakult Swallows

Last appearance
- MLB: 27 September, 2000, for the Pittsburgh Pirates
- NPB: 8 October, 2013, for the Yokohama DeNA BayStars

MLB statistics
- Batting average: .259
- Hits: 86
- Home runs: 12
- Runs batted in: 48

NPB statistics
- Batting average: .301
- Hits: 2,017
- Home runs: 380
- Runs batted in: 1,272
- Games managed: 692
- Managerial record: 336–336
- Winning %: .499
- Stats at Baseball Reference

Teams
- As a player: Cleveland Indians (1998–2000); Pittsburgh Pirates (2000); Yakult Swallows/Tokyo Yakult Swallows (2001–2007); Yomiuri Giants (2008–2011); Yokohama DeNA BayStars (2012–2013); As manager: Yokohama DeNA BayStars (2016–2020)

Career highlights and awards
- NPB: 2× Central League MVP (2008–2009); 8× NPB All-Star (2002–2003, 2007–2012); 4× Best Nine Award (2003, 2007–2009); 2× Japan Series champion (2001, 2009); Central League Climax Series MVP (2008); Central League Batting Champion (2009); 2x Central League Home Run Leader (2003, 2010); 4× Central League RBI Leader (2003, 2007, 2008, 2010); 3x Central League Hits Leader (2003, 2007, 2009)

Member of the Japanese

Baseball Hall of Fame
- Induction: 2023

Alexander Ramón Ramírez Quiñónez (born 3 October 1974), nicknamed Ramichan (ラミちゃん), is a Venezuelan-born Japanese former professional baseball outfielder known for his time in Nippon Professional Baseball (NPB). He holds the all time hit record for a foreign player in NPB with 2,017 and is the only foreigner to reach the 2,000 mark. He was inducted into the Japanese Baseball Hall of Fame in 2023 and the Venezuelan Baseball Hall of Fame in 2025.

Before playing in Japan, he played in Major League Baseball (MLB) for the Cleveland Indians (1998–2000) and Pittsburgh Pirates (2000).

He managed the Yokohama BayStars from 2016 to 2020.

== Professional baseball career ==
=== Major League Baseball ===
Ramírez signed with the Cleveland Indians as an international free agent in July 1991. In 1995, he was a replacement player during the ongoing strike for Cleveland, playing in one spring training game. He was named the team's 1998 Minor League Player of the Year, getting the Lou Boudreau Award.

Ramírez made his MLB debut with Cleveland in 1998. On 28 July 2000, the Indians traded Ramírez and Enrique Wilson to the Pittsburgh Pirates for Wil Cordero. Across three MLB seasons, Ramírez batted .259 with 12 home runs, 48 runs batted in (RBI), 38 runs scored, 17 doubles, three triples, and three stolen bases in 135 games.

=== Nippon Professional Baseball ===
After the 2000 season, Ramírez signed with the Yakult Swallows (2001–2007) and was their cleanup hitter. During his final season with the Swallows he set the Central League record for most base hits in a single season with 204. (This record did not stand long, as Hanshin Tigers outfielder Matt Murton surpassed Ramírez's tally en route to finishing the 2010 season with 214 hits.)

The 2007 season was Ramírez's last with the Swallows, who did offer him the multi-year contract he sought. Instead, the outfielder signed with the Yomiuri Giants for the 2008 season. Ramírez quickly flourished with his new team. In 2008, he led the Central League with 125 RBI while hitting .319 (sixth in the league) with 45 home runs (second). He also hit two home runs in Game 2 of the Japan Series, including one in the bottom of the ninth to win Game 2. At the end of the 2008 season, Ramírez won the Central League MVP Award. He was the third Venezuelan player to be so honored in Japanese baseball, joining Roberto Petagine (Central League, 2001) and Alex Cabrera (Pacific League, 2002).

After playing eight seasons in NPB, Ramirez obtained FA Right in 2008 and was no longer counted as a foreign player for roster purposes. As of 2017, only four foreign players in NPB history had accrued enough service time to achieve the classification.

On 6 April 2013, Ramirez hit a home run to record his 2,000th career hit in the NPB, becoming the 42nd player and the first foreign player to accomplish the feat. This accomplishment also earned Ramírez an invitation to the Meikyukai, a private club recognizing Japan's elite players. He was the first Western player to be so honored.

=== Baseball Challenge League ===
Ramírez spent the 2014 season as a player-coach with the Gunma Diamond Pegasus of Japan's Baseball Challenge League. In 45 games, he hit .305 with 7 home runs and 38 RBI. He retired after the 2014 season and became the Diamond Pegasus' senior director.

=== Coaching ===
In the middle of the 2015, Ramírez joined the Orix Buffaloes as an advisor, mentoring younger players. In October 2015 he was named as the BayStars manager for the 2016 season, replacing Kiyoshi Nakahata who resigned at the end of the 2015 season due to the team's poor performance. In his first season managing, the team finished 69–71–3, finishing third in the Central League, and advancing to the Climax Series, where the BayStars defeated the Yomiuri Giants, 2–1 in the first round before falling to the Hiroshima Toyo Carp, 4–1, in the league championship round. In his second year as manager, the BayStars reached the 2017 Japan Series, but lost to the Fukuoka SoftBank Hawks, 4 games to 2. Ramírez coached the team through the 2020 season.

Ramírez founded and coached Japan Breeze, which competed in the 2025 Caribbean Series. The team went 0–4 and was no-hit in a mercy rule loss in the tournament.

== Career statistics ==
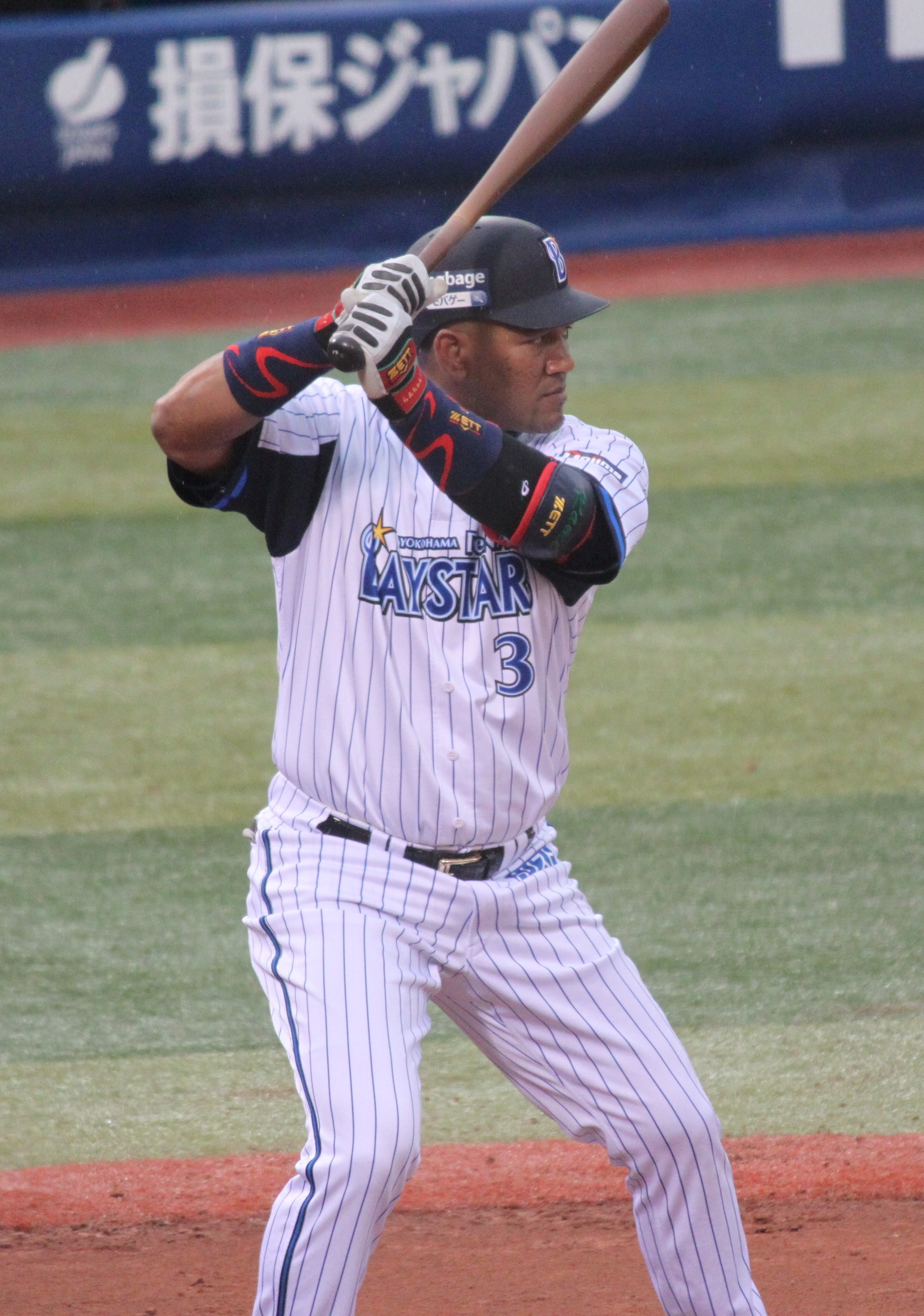
Ramirez in 2012.

Nippon Professional Baseball
Year	Age	Team	G	AB	R	H	2B	3B	HR	TB	RBI	SB	AVG
2001	27	Yakult	138	510	60	143	23	0	29	253	88	1	.280
2002	28	Yakult	139	539	65	159	25	0	24	256	92	0	.295
2003	29	Yakult	140	567	105	189	34	3	40	349	124	4	.333
2004	30	Yakult	129	525	79	160	30	2	31	287	110	2	.305
2005	31	Yakult	146	596	70	168	19	1	32	285	104	5	.282
2006	32	Yakult	146	603	79	161	28	2	26	271	112	0	.267
2007	33	Yakult	144	594	80	204	41	3	29	338	122	0	.343
2008	34	Yomiuri	144	548	84	175	28	0	45	338	125	1	.319
2009	35	Yomiuri	144	577	66	186	35	0	31	314	103	4	.322
2010	36	Yomiuri	144	566	93	172	28	0	49	347	129	1	.304
2011	37	Yomiuri	137	477	39	133	12	1	23	216	73	2	.279
2012	38	DeNA	137	476	40	143	25	0	19	225	76	0	.300
2013	39	DeNA	56	130	6	24	0	0	2	30	14	0	.185
		Total	1,744	6,708	866	2,017	330	12	380	3,709	1,272	20	

Statistics current as of 21 November 2014

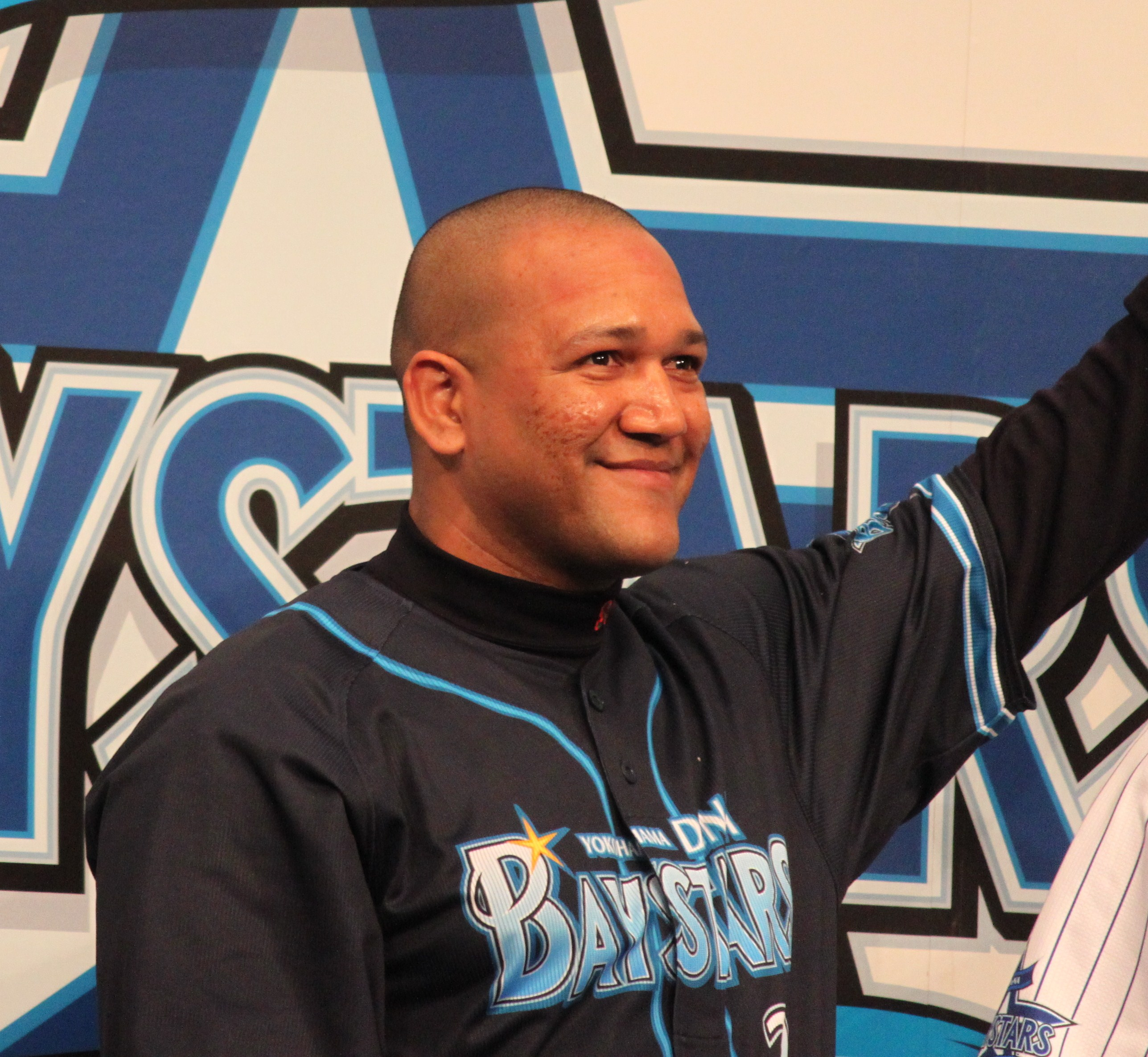
Ramirez in 2012.

== Business career ==
In February 2013, Ramirez, his wife, and his son opened a restaurant in Tokyo called Ramichan Cafe, serving the cuisine of Puerto Rico, where his wife grew up. The restaurant has since closed.

Ramirez has spoken about his faith, saying, "I believe [continuing to play baseball] is my desire, but it's not my life. God has already blessed me with this career, and whatever God has planned for me, I will be happy to follow that, whether or not I play baseball again. It's not what I want; it's what God wants for me."

In January 2019, Ramirez became a Japanese citizen.

== See also ==
- List of Major League Baseball players from Venezuela
- List of top Nippon Professional Baseball home run hitters
- List of Nippon Professional Baseball players with 1,000 runs batted in
- List of Nippon Professional Baseball career hits leaders

Awards and achievements
Preceded by Sean Casey	Indians' Minor League Player of the Year (the Lou Boudreau Award); 1998	Succeeded by Scott Morgan
