= List of Nippon Professional Baseball players with 1,000 runs batted in =

The following is a list of Nippon Professional Baseball players who have reached the 1,000 run batted in (RBI) milestone. RBIs are usually accumulated in baseball by successfully allowing a runner on base to score as a result of making contact at-bat, although a batter is credited with an RBI if a run scores as a result of his reaching first base with the bases loaded as a result of either a base on balls (walk) or being hit by a pitch.

Sadaharu Oh holds the Nippon Professional Baseball RBI career record with 2,170.

== The List ==
*	denotes elected to Japanese Baseball Hall of Fame.
**Bold**	denotes active player. (Note: A player is considered inactive if he has announced his retirement or not played for a full season.)

Stats updated as of 2026. Quoted from the official Nippon Professional Baseball website.

Rank	Player (2026 RBIs)	HR	Years
1	Sadaharu Oh *	2,170	1959–1980
2	Katsuya Nomura *	1,988	1954–1980
3	Hiromitsu Kadota *	1,678	1970–1992
4	Isao Harimoto *	1,676	1959–1981
5	Hiromitsu Ochiai *	1,564	1979–1998
6	Kazuhiro Kiyohara	1,530	1985–2008
7	Shigeo Nagashima *	1,522	1958–1974
8	Tomoaki Kanemoto	1,521	1992–2012
9	Katsuo Osugi *	1,507	1965–1983
10	Koji Yamamoto *	1,475	1969–1986
11	Sachio Kinugasa *	1,448	1965–1987
12	Masahiro Doi	1,400	1962–1981
13	**Takeya Nakamura**	1,374	2003-present
14	Norihiro Nakamura	1,338	1992–2014
15	Tetsuharu Kawakami *	1,319	1938–1958
16	Koji Akiyama *	1,312	1981, 1984–2002
17	Hiroki Kokubo	1304	1994-2012
18	Takahiro Arai	1,303	1999-2018
19	Kazuhiro Yamauchi *	1,286	1952–1970
20	Shinnosuke Abe	1,285	2001–2019
21	Alex Ramírez	1,272	2001–2013
22	Tuffy Rhodes	1,269	1996–2005, 2007–2009
23	Hideji Katō	1,268	1969–1987
24	Yasunori Oshima	1,234	1971–1994
25	Takeshi Yamasaki	1,205	1989–2013
26	**Hideto Asamura**	1,201	2010-present
27	Shinichi Eto *	1,189	1959–1976
28	Makoto Matsubara	1,180	1962–1981
29	Michihiro Ogasawara	1,169	1997–2015
30	Nobuhiko Matsunaka	1,168	1997–2015
31	Kōichi Tabuchi	1,135	1969–1984
32	Fumio Fujimura *	1,126	1936–1958
33	Shuichi Murata	1,123	2003-2017
34	Tomonori Maeda	1,112	1990-2013
35	Tatsunori Hara	1,093	1981–1995
36	Sho Nakata	1,087	2007-2025
37	Kazuhiro Wada	1,081	1997-2015
38	**Hayato Sakamoto**	1,079	2007-present
39	Kosuke Fukudome	1,078	1999-2022
40	Michiyo Arito	1,061	1969–1986

== See also ==
- List of Major League Baseball career runs batted in leaders
- List of top Nippon Professional Baseball home run hitters
- List of Nippon Professional Baseball career hits leaders
