= Katsuo Osugi =

Japanese baseball player (1945–1992)

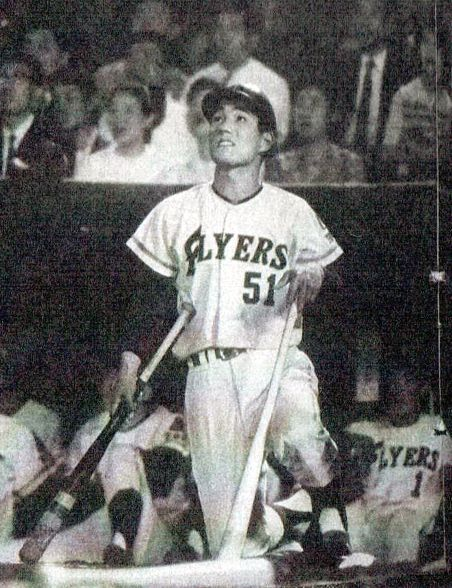
- First baseman
- Born: March 5, 1945; Katsuta, Okayama, Japan
- Died: April 30, 1992 (aged 47)
- Batted: Right Threw: Right

debut
- 1965, for the Toei Flyers

Last appearance
- 1983, for the Yakult Swallows

Career statistics
- Batting average: .287
- Home runs: 486
- Hits: 2,228
- Runs batted in: 1,507

Teams
- As player: Toei Flyers / Nittaku Home Flyers / Nippon Ham Fighters (1965–1974); Yakult Swallows (1975–1983); As coach: Yokohama Taiyo Whales (1990–1991)

Career highlights and awards
- Japan Series champion (1978); Japan Series MVP (1978); 5× Best Nine Award (1967, 1969–1972); Tokyo Yakult Swallows #8 retired

Member of the Japanese

Baseball Hall of Fame
- Induction: 1997

Katsuo Osugi (大杉 勝男, Ōsugi Katsuo; March 5, 1945 – April 30, 1992) was a Japanese professional baseball first baseman in Nippon Professional Baseball. He played for the Toei Flyers / Nittaku Home Flyers / Nippon Ham Fighters from 1965 to 1974 and the Yakult Swallows from 1975 to 1983. He was the Japan Series MVP in 1978 on the strength of his four home runs with 10 RBIs and a .310 batting average as the Swallows won the Series in seven games for their first championship in franchise history. He was awarded the Best Nine Award five times. He was inducted into the Japanese Baseball Hall of Fame in 1997. Osugi's 486 career home runs places him ninth on the all-time NPB list.

== See also ==
- List of top Nippon Professional Baseball home run hitters
- List of Nippon Professional Baseball players with 1,000 runs batted in
- List of Nippon Professional Baseball career hits leaders
