= Norihiro Nakamura =

Japanese baseball player (born 1973)

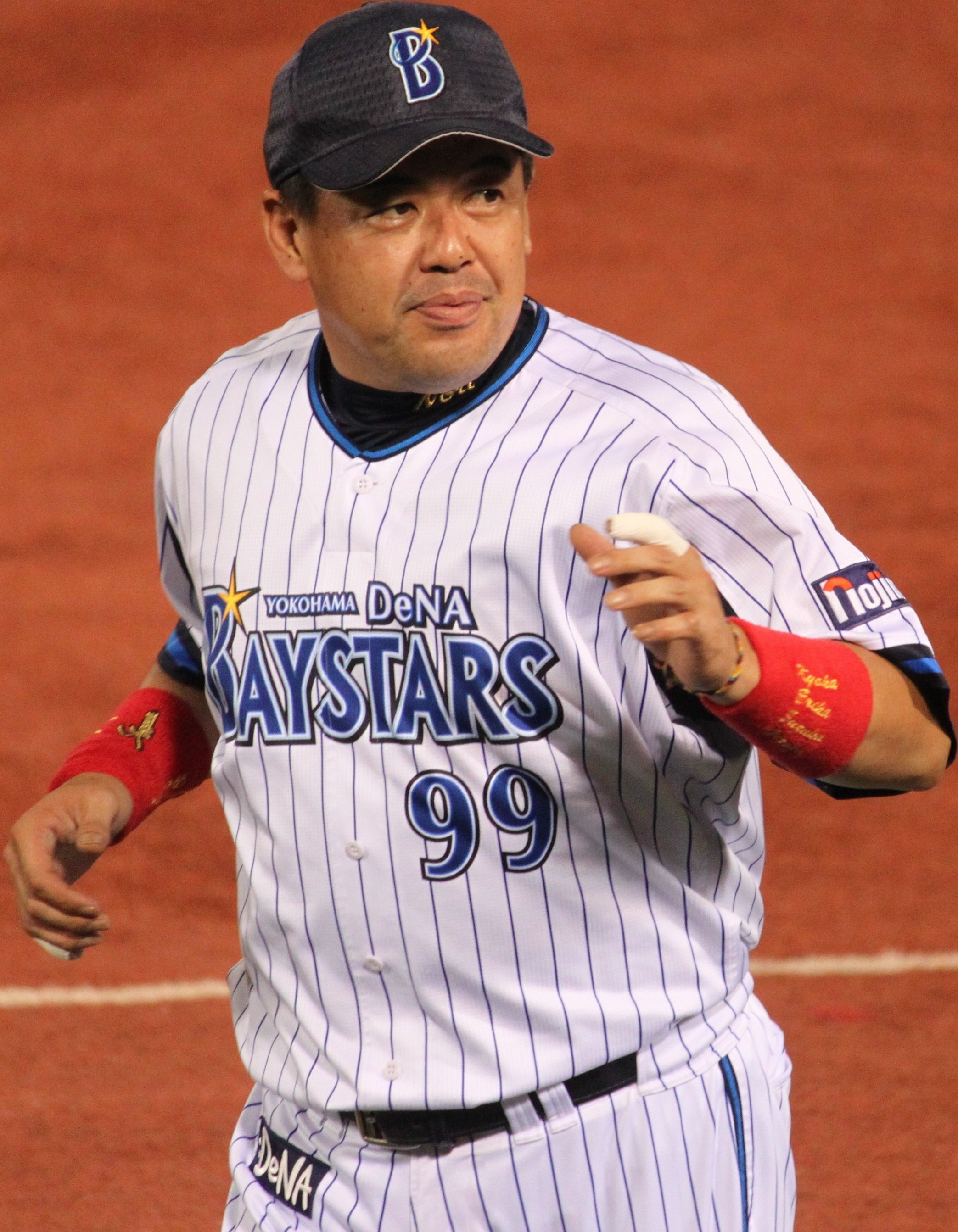
- Nakamura with the Yokohama DeNA BayStars in 2013
- Third baseman/Coach
- Born: July 24, 1973 (age 52); Osaka, Japan
- Batted: Right Threw: Right

Professional debut
- NPB: June 12, 1992, for the Kintetsu Buffaloes
- MLB: April 10, 2005, for the Los Angeles Dodgers

Last appearance
- October, 2014, for the Yokohama DeNA BayStars

NPB statistics
- Batting average: .266
- Home runs: 404
- Hits: 2,101
- Runs batted in: 1,348

MLB statistics
- Batting average: .128
- Home runs: 0
- Hits: 5
- Runs batted in: 3
- Stats at Baseball Reference

Teams
- As player: Kintetsu Buffaloes / Osaka Kintetsu Buffaloes (1992–2004); Los Angeles Dodgers (2005); Orix Buffaloes (2006); Chunichi Dragons (2007–2008); Tohoku Rakuten Golden Eagles (2009–2010); Yokohama BayStars / Yokohama DeNA BayStars (2011–2014); As coach: Hamamatsu Kaiseikan High School (2017–2021); Chunichi Dragons (2022–2023)

Career highlights and awards
- 9× NPB All-Star (1995, 1996, 1999 - 2002, 2004, 2012, 2013); Pacific League Leader of Home Run (2000); 2× Pacific League Leader of RBI (2000, 2001); 5× Pacific League Best Nine Award (1996, 1999 - 2002); 7× Mitsui Golden Glove Award (1999 - 2002, 2004, 2007, 2008); 2× NPB All-Star Game MVP (2001, 2012); 2007 Japan Series MVP
Medals
Men's baseball
Representing Japan
Olympics
Bronze medal – third place	Athens 2004	Team competition

Norihiro Nakamura (中村 紀洋, Nakamura Norihiko; born July 24, 1973) is a Japanese former professional baseball third baseman. Nakamura spent almost all of his professional career in Japan with the Osaka Kintetsu Buffaloes. Nakamura had a .266 career batting average, 404 home runs and 1348 RBI, and was an eight-time All-Star and four-time Golden Glove winner. Nakamura is one of only 16 players to have hit 400 or more home runs in NPB. He also played briefly for the Los Angeles Dodgers of Major League Baseball in 2005.

== Career ==
=== 1992–2004: Osaka Kintetsu Buffaloes ===
Drafted in 1992, Nakamura began to emerge as one of the leading power hitters in Nippon Professional Baseball in 1995. From 1998 to 2002, he had six consecutive 40-home run, 100-RBI seasons, setting career highs in batting average (.320) homers (46) and RBI (132) in 2001.

=== 2002–2005: Dalliances with MLB ===
In 2002, he agreed to a two-year, $7 million contract with the New York Mets, but, after word leaked out before he could formally notify the Osaka Kintetsu Buffaloes management, Nakamura rejected the deal, saying that "I cannot trust such a team which leaked this information at its own Web site" (not knowing that each team's site is managed by Major League Baseball), and re-signed with Kintetsu over considerable controversy.

In 2003, he suffered a torn knee cartilage, and his offensive numbers began to decline. However, he hit well while participating in a spring training exchange program with the Los Angeles Dodgers in 2004.

In 2005, Nakamura walked away from a guaranteed $10 million two-year contract in Japan, primarily also in protest against Orix with the Buffaloes-BlueWave merger that happened the previous offseason, to sign a $500,000 non-guaranteed minor league deal with the Dodgers as a non-roster invitee to spring training. He made his Major League Baseball debut for the Dodgers on April 10, 2005. Highly touted from his playing days in Japan, he received the opportunity to win the Dodgers starting third base role afterAdrián Beltré left the Dodgers in free agency the previous offseason. However, Nakamura managed only a .128 batting average with no home runs and 3 runs batted in. He was optioned to the Las Vegas 51s, the Dodgers Triple-A affiliate, by mid-May. He would remain with the 51s the remainder of the season, after which the Dodgers granted him his release. Just after being released, he said "If Ichiro had started his career under [a] minor [league] contract like me, he couldn't be called up to [the] Major League[s]","This year is a kind of penalties for me", and "I don't know why I played in [the] minor league[s]".

=== 2006: Orix Buffaloes ===
In 2006, Nakamura re-signed with the Orix Buffaloes, playing primarily as a designated hitter. He finished 2006 with .232 average, 12 homers and 45 RBI.

=== 2007–2008: Chunichi Dragons ===
Nakamura signed a one-year deal for just 4,000,000 yen (about $34,000) as a trainee with the Chunichi Dragons on February 25, 2007. He signed a one-year deal for 6,000,000 yen (about $50,000) as a player on March 22, 2007. His annual income declined due to many troubles, but he got over the shock and was crowned the MVP of the 2007 Japan Series, the only NPB championship of his career.

=== 2009–2010: Tohoku Rakuten Golden Eagles ===
Nakamura originally anticipated becoming a first baseman in 2009 to replace Tyrone Woods, who left the Dragons after the 2008 season. However, he declared himself a free agent and later signed with the Tohoku Rakuten Golden Eagles after the season ended.

=== Yokohama BayStars ===
Nakamura signed a one-year contract with the Yokohama BayStars on May 24, 2011, and was released on October 3, 2014. He officially retired in February 2015.

== Post-playing career ==
Nakamura served as a coach at Hamamatsu Kaiseikan High School from 2017 to 2021. On November 2, 2021, Nakamura was hired by the Chunichi Dragons to serve as the team's hitting coach for the 2022 season.

== See also ==
- List of top Nippon Professional Baseball home run hitters
- List of Nippon Professional Baseball career hits leaders
- List of Nippon Professional Baseball players with 1,000 runs batted in
