= Michiyo Arito =

Japanese baseball player (born 1946)

- Third baseman
- Born: December 17, 1946 (age 79); Usa, Kōchi, Japan
- Batted: Right Threw: Right

debut
- 1969, for the Lotte Orions

Last appearance
- 1986, for the Lotte Orions

Career statistics
- Batting average: .282
- Home runs: 348
- Hits: 2,057
- Runs batted in: 1,061

Teams
- As player: Lotte Orions (1969–1986); As manager: Lotte Orions (1987–1989)

Career highlights and awards
- Pacific League Rookie of the Year (1969); 10x Best Nine Award (1969-1975, 1977, 1980, 1981); Japan Series champion (1974)

Michiyo Arito (有藤 通世, Aritō Michiyo; born December 17, 1946) is a Japanese former professional baseball third baseman in Nippon Professional Baseball. He played his entire career for the Lotte Orions from 1969 to 1986. He was the Pacific League Rookie of the Year in 1969.

== See also ==
- List of top Nippon Professional Baseball home run hitters
- List of Nippon Professional Baseball players with 1,000 runs batted in
- List of Nippon Professional Baseball career hits leaders
