= Wladimir Balentien =

Dutch-Curacaoan baseball player (born 1984)

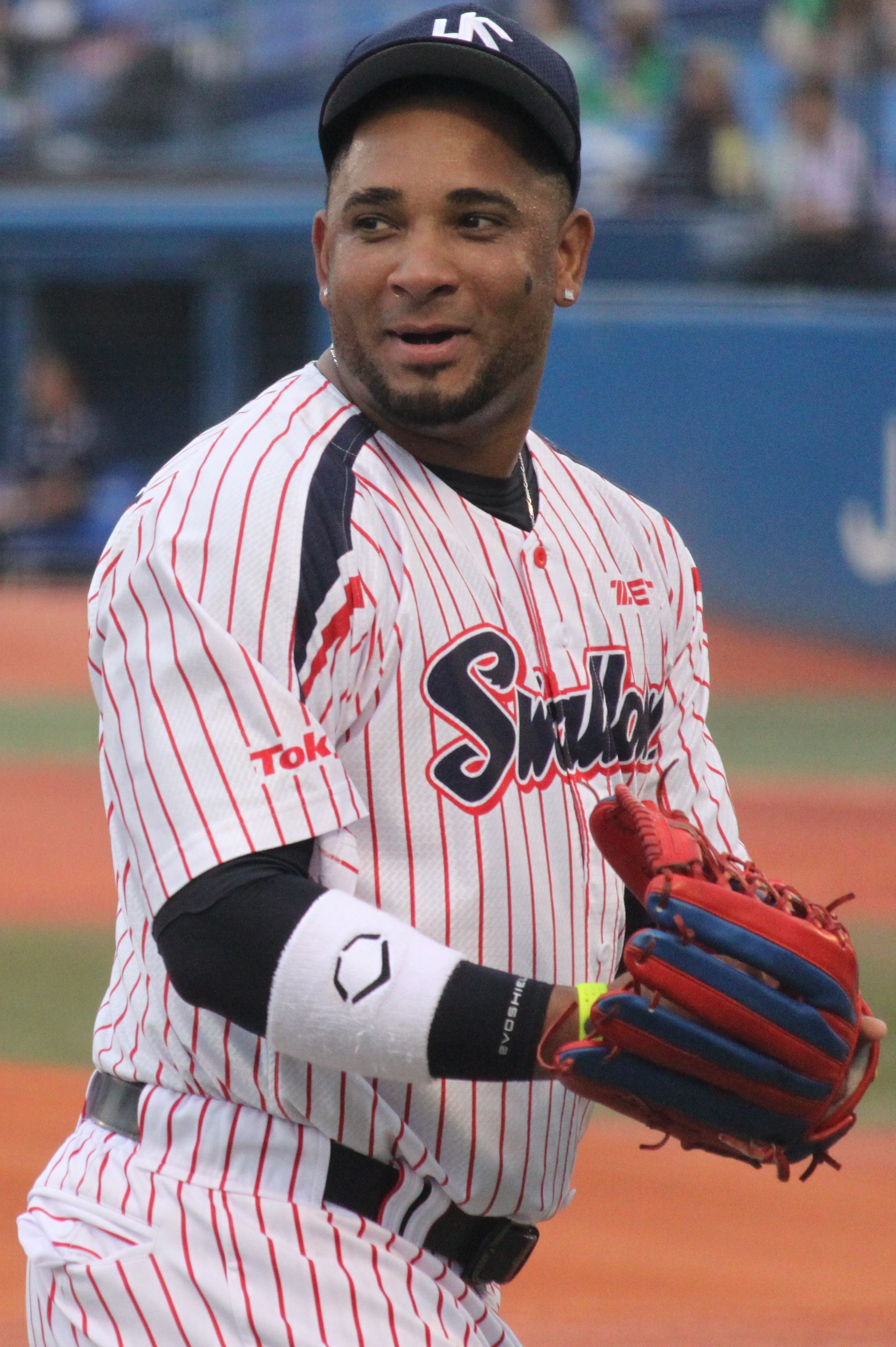
- Balentien with the Tokyo Yakult Swallows
- Outfielder / Designated hitter
- Born: July 2, 1984 (age 42); Willemstad, Curaçao
- Batted: Right Threw: Right

Professional debut
- MLB: September 4, 2007, for the Seattle Mariners
- NPB: April 12, 2011, for the Tokyo Yakult Swallows

Last appearance
- MLB: October 2, 2009, for the Cincinnati Reds
- NPB: June 20, 2021, for the Fukuoka SoftBank Hawks

MLB statistics
- Batting average: .221
- Hits: 113
- Home runs: 15
- Runs batted in: 52

NPB statistics
- Batting average: .266
- Hits: 1,001
- Home runs: 301
- Runs batted in: 794
- Stats at Baseball Reference

Teams
- Seattle Mariners (2007–2009); Cincinnati Reds (2009); Tokyo Yakult Swallows (2011–2019); Fukuoka SoftBank Hawks (2020–2021)

Career highlights and awards
- NPB: Central League MVP (2013); Japan Series champion (2020); 6× NPB All-Star (2011–2014, 2016, 2018); 2× Best Nine Award (2012-2013); 3× Central League home run leader (2011–2013); International: All-World Baseball Classic Team (2017)

Wladimir Ramon "Coco" Balentien (Dutch pronunciation: [ˈvlaːdimiːr baːlə(n)ˈtin]; born July 2, 1984) is a Curaçaoan-Dutch former professional baseball outfielder. He played in Major League Baseball (MLB) for the Seattle Mariners and Cincinnati Reds, and in Nippon Professional Baseball (NPB) for the Tokyo Yakult Swallows and Fukuoka SoftBank Hawks.

In 2013, he broke the NPB single-season home run record of 55, previously held by professional baseball's all-time home run leader Sadaharu Oh, American Tuffy Rhodes, and Venezuelan Alex Cabrera. Balentien finished the season with 60 home runs, becoming the only player to ever do so in NPB history.

== Professional career ==
=== Seattle Mariners ===
Balentien was signed as an undrafted free agent by the Mariners in 2000. He made his professional debut in 2003 with the AZL Mariners. He split the 2004 season between the Single-A Wisconsin Timber Rattlers and the High-A Inland Empire 66ers, accumulating a .279/.321/.513 batting line with 17 home runs and 51 runs batted in (RBI). The next year, Balentien spent the season with Inland Empire, batting .291/.338/.553 with 25 home runs and 93 RBI in 123 games. In 2006, Balentien played for the Double-A San Antonio Missions, posting a batting line of .230/.337/.435 to go along with 22 home runs and 82 RBI. In 2007, he was assigned to the Triple-A Tacoma Rainiers for the season.

Balentien was selected to the All-Star Futures Game in San Francisco that year, a result of his .328 average, 20 home runs, and 66 RBI by that point. He was called up to the major leagues with the Mariners on September 4, 2007, and made his MLB debut that night against the New York Yankees at Yankee Stadium. Balentien pinch-hit for José Guillén in the 8th inning and hit a two-run double in his first major league at bat.

Balentien was invited to spring training with the Mariners in 2008. However, the starting right field job went to Brad Wilkerson, and Balentien was optioned to Tacoma on March 24. When Wilkerson and first baseman Greg Norton were designated for assignment on April 30, Balentien and Jeff Clement were called up to the big leagues for a game in Cleveland against the Indians. Facing Indians starter Cliff Lee in the top of the seventh inning, Balentien hit a three-run homer to end Lee's streak of 27 scoreless innings pitched. His homer was one of only 12 Lee gave up in a Cy Young Award-winning season. Balentien was sent down to Tacoma in mid-June after batting .196 in 32 games. He returned to the Mariners in early August, after the team designated José Vidro for assignment. He finished his rookie season with a .202 batting average and 7 home runs in 71 games.

Balentien was on the Mariners opening day roster in 2009. He started the season strong, batting .313 with five walks and five extra base hits in his first 16 games. However, his contact issues returned, and on July 25, the Mariners designated him for assignment. He hit .213 with 4 home runs and 13 RBI in 170 plate appearances for the Mariners. Outfielder Michael Saunders was called up to replace Balentien.

=== Cincinnati Reds ===
On July 29, 2009, the Mariners traded Balentien to the Cincinnati Reds for reliever Robert Manuel. He remained a part-time player for the Reds, starting 28 games in the last two months of the season. In his final MLB game, against the Pittsburgh Pirates on October 2, Balentien hit a 495-foot home run into the upper deck beyond left field.

On April 14, 2010, Balentien was outrighted off of the 40-man roster. He spent the 2010 season with the Triple-A Louisville Bats, hitting .282 with 25 home runs in 116 games. He elected free agency on November 6.

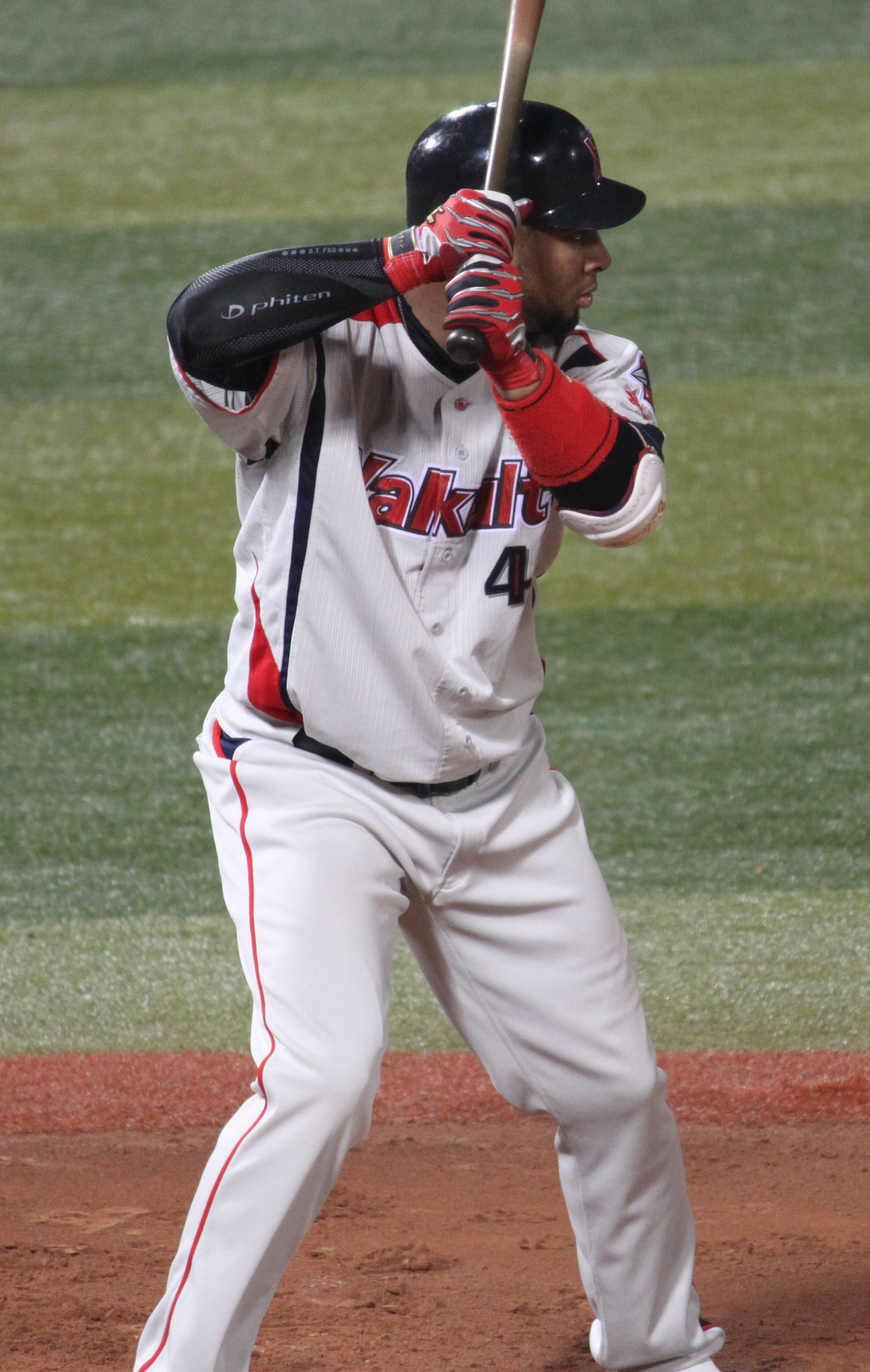
Balentien in 2011

=== Tokyo Yakult Swallows ===
On November 16, 2010, Balentien signed with the Tokyo Yakult Swallows in the Japanese Nippon Professional Baseball. In the 2011 season, he led the Central League with 31 home runs. In 2012, Balentien led the league with 31 home runs, but did not reach the minimum requirement of plate appearances, having only taken 422 trips to the plate.

==== 2013: Home run record ====
On August 29, 2013, Balentien hit his 51st home run of the 2013 season. With over a month of the regular season remaining at that date, many speculated that Balentien could break the Nippon Professional Baseball league season record. The record of 55 home runs in a single season was originally set by Sadaharu Oh in 1964 and later tied by Tuffy Rhodes and Alex Cabrera. The Swallows added a "Coco Meter" to their website, tracking his progress through the season. On September 10, Balentien hit his 55th home run. He subsequently broke the record, hitting his 56th and 57th home runs on September 15, at home against the Hanshin Tigers. He finished the season with 60 home runs and 131 RBI in 130 games.

Late in the 2013 season, it was revealed that NPB had secretly introduced a livelier baseball, resulting in a marked increase in home runs across the league. The scandal over the juiced baseball led NPB commissioner Ryozo Kato to resign in September 2013.

==== 2014–2019 ====
In 2014, Balentien played in 112 games for Yakult, slashing .301/.419/.587 with 31 home runs and 69 RBI. Balentien only appeared in 15 games in 2015 due to injury, and in 2016 he batted .269/.369/.516 with 31 home runs and 96 RBI. In 2017, Balentien hit .254/.358/.506 with 32 home runs and 80 RBI in 125 games. In 2018 for Yakult, Balentien posted a .268/.370/.533 batting line with 38 home runs and 131 RBI on the year and was selected to the 2018 NPB All-Star game. In 2019, Balentien slashed .280/.363/.554 with 33 home runs and 93 RBI in 120 games. On December 2, 2019, he became a free agent.

=== Fukuoka SoftBank Hawks ===
On December 16, 2019, Balentien signed with the Fukuoka SoftBank Hawks. In 2020, Balentien finished the regular season with a batting average of .168, 9 home runs, and 22 RBI in 60 games. He was selected to the Japan Series roster for the Hawks in the 2020 Japan Series but did not play in the Hawks' four-game sweep of the Yomiuri Giants.

Balentien began the 2021 season with the Hawks' minor league team in the Japan Western League. He returned to the NPB team in May. On June 13, he passed two statistical milestones in one game against the Yakult Swallows: he hit his 300th NPB home run and his 1,000th hit. He hit a home run in his final at bat with the Hawks' Western League team on September 30.

On October 12, 2021, the Hawks announced Balentien would not return to the club. On January 22, 2022, Balentien announced his retirement from Japanese baseball.

=== Saraperos de Saltillo ===
On February 13, 2022, Balentien signed with the Saraperos de Saltillo of the Mexican League. In 18 games, he batted .231/.351/.477 with four home runs and 11 RBI. Balentien was placed on the injured list on May 15, then released by the team on May 25.

== International career ==
Balentien represented the Netherlands at the 2004 Summer Olympics, the 2013 World Baseball Classic, 2015 WBSC Premier12, the 2017 World Baseball Classic, 2022 Haarlem Baseball Week, and the 2023 World Baseball Classic.

Balentien hit a home run in the Netherlands 11–0 blowout of home team Greece in the 2004 Olympics. Balentien received the Guus van der Heijden Memorial Trophy in 2004, awarded to the best Dutch international baseball player under the age of 23.

Balentien was named to the 2017 All-World Baseball Classic team after leading the tournament with 4 home runs, 12 RBI, and 29 total bases.

== Coaching career ==
Balentien became the manager of the Santa María Pirates of the Curaçao National Championship AA League and led them during the 2025 Baseball Champions League Americas.

== Personal life ==
Balentien lives in Willemstad, Curaçao with his daughter, Jeniliee. He had a second child, born in 2019.

A street in Willemstad was renamed after him in 2013, celebrating his Japanese home run record.

Balentien was one of several Curaçaoan athletes that supported the Food Bank of Curaçao in 2020.

On January 13, 2014, Balentien was arrested on domestic violence charges in Florida after an incident with his wife, Karla, as the couple was in the midst of divorce proceedings. According to police records, Balentien allegedly visited Karla's home, pulled out window screens to enter the house, grabbed her arm as she ran upstairs, and then locked her bedroom door with him, her, and their young daughter inside. That month, Balentien was freed on bail, pled not guilty, and returned to Japan, where he apologized to fans. Days after the incident, Karla said that he had never been violent against her before. Prosecutors decided to stop prosecuting the case in September 2014, after Karla said she would no longer cooperate on the case and did not feel threatened by her husband. Prosecutors also cited a lack of evidence, as witnesses could not return to Miami for a trial. Court records show Karla filed for divorce again in 2022.
