= Michihiro Ogasawara =

Japanese baseball player & coach (born 1973)

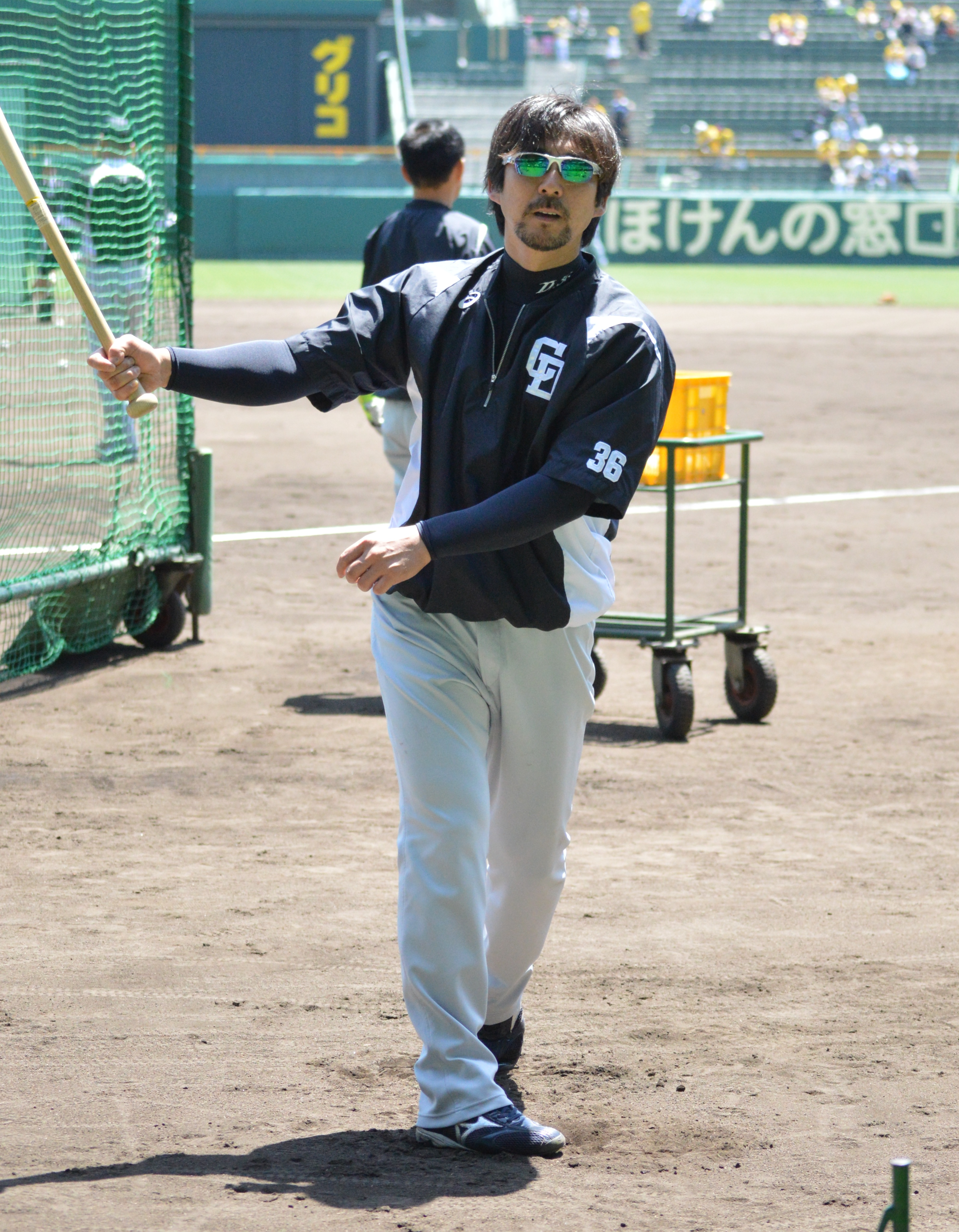
- Infielder / Coach
- Born: October 25, 1973 (age 52); Mihama-ku, Chiba, Chiba Prefecture, Japan
- Batted: Left Threw: Right

debut
- 8 April, 1997, for the Nippon Ham Fighters

Last appearance
- 21 September, 2015, for the Chunichi Dragons

Career statistics
- Batting average: .310
- Hits: 2,120
- Home runs: 378
- Run batted in: 1,169
- Stats at Baseball Reference

Teams
- As player: Nippon-Ham Fighters/Hokkaido Nippon-Ham Fighters (1997–2006); Yomiuri Giants (2007–2013); Chunichi Dragons (2014–2015); As coach: Chunichi Dragons (2016–2019); Hokkaido Nippon-Ham Fighters (2020–2021); Yomiuri Giants (2022–2023)

Career highlights and awards
- 2× Japan Series champion (2006, 2009); 2006 Pacific League MVP; 2007 Central League MVP; 2× Pacific League Batting Champion (2002, 2003); 2006 Pacific League Home Run Champion; 2006 Pacific League RBI Leader; 2× Pacific League Hit Leader (2000, 2001); 7× Best Nine Award (1B:1999, 2001, 2006; 3B:2003, 2004, 2007, 2009); 6× Golden Glove Award (1B: 1999-2002, 2006; 3B: 2003); 11× NPB All-Star (1999-2007, 2009, 2010); 8× Monthly MVP; Hit for the cycle on September 3, 2008
Medals
Men's baseball
Representing Japan
Bronze medal – third place	Athens 2004	Team competition
World Baseball Classic
Gold medal – first place	2006 San Diego	Team competition
Gold medal – first place	2009 Los Angeles	Team competition

Michihiro Ogasawara (小笠原 道大, born October 25, 1973, in Mihama-ku, Chiba, Chiba Prefecture, Japan) is a Japanese former professional baseball player.

His career spanned 18 years with the Hokkaido Nippon-Ham Fighters, Yomiuri Giants, and the Chunichi Dragons where he won two Japan Series, two MVP awards in both the Pacific and Central leagues; only one of two people to do so and the first to do it in consecutive seasons. He was an NPB All-Star 11 times. He was also a part of the 2006 and 2009 World Baseball Classic winning Japan sides.

== Early career ==
Ogasawara started playing baseball at age 7 playing in the Chiba West Little League. From 1989 he studied at Gyosei International High School in Kisarazu, Chiba Prefecture. When he started at the team he was regarded as a complete no-name and his then coach mentioned that "we were asked to go after a junior middle schooler from the Chiba West Little League and we got the player that no one spoke of, Ogasawara." Up until that point he had been tried at a variety of fielding positions including shortstop, third base and outfield but during high school was converted to be a second baseman and the following year served as a catcher (however Ogasawara admits that catcher was his least favourite position) In his junior year, alongside fellow future pro Tetsuya Kitagawa he finished runner-up in the Chiba prefectural tournament. Although now widely regarded for his power and hitting prowess, Ogaswara failed to register a single home run in the tournament.

Following graduation from high school, Ogasawara was employed with NTT East. He was judged at the time to, even in the worst case, still be of use as a bullpen catcher. He would start life with the team as a catcher and later form a battery with future Hokkaido Nippon Ham Fighters team-mate, Naoyuki Tateishi. In 1996, he took part in the 67th Intercity baseball tournament, playing alongside Nobuhiko Matsunaka with Nippon Steel & Sumitomo Metal Kazusa Magic to reach the best 8.

In 1996, Ogasawara was the third draft pick selected by the Fighters in the 1996 Nippon Professional Baseball Draft where he made the declaration that he would become a "player that can contest for batting titles."

== Professional career ==
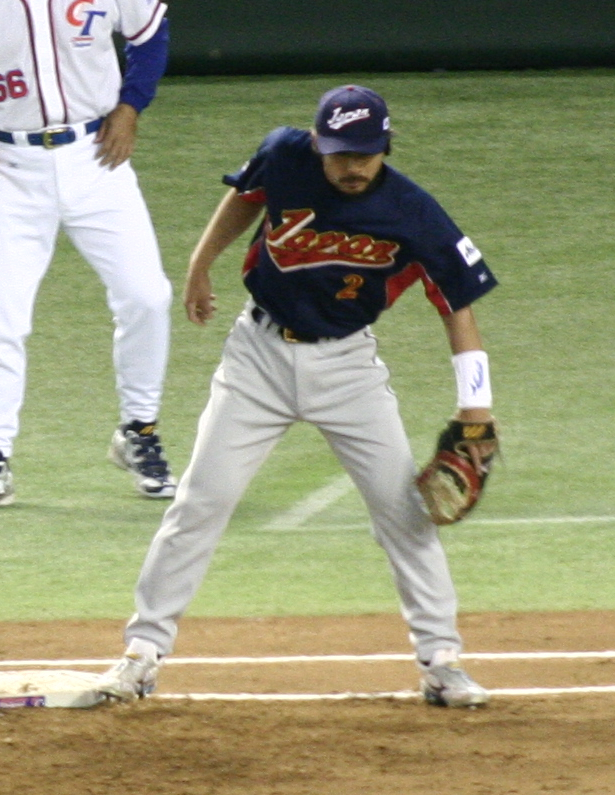
Ogasawara played for Japan in the 2006 World Baseball Classic.

Ogasawara was one of the most consistent hitters in Japanese baseball. He won two consecutive batting titles from 2002–2003, and led the league in home runs and RBIs in 2006 to win the Pacific League MVP award. He led the league in hits from 2000–2001, and has won 6 Japanese Golden Glove awards at first base and third base. He participated in the 2004 Summer Olympics held in Athens, Greece, winning a bronze medal. He also played for the Japanese national team in the 2006 World Baseball Classic, where he hit a home run off Esteban Loaiza at Angel Stadium of Anaheim. In 2006, he helped the Hokkaido Nippon-Ham Fighters win their first Pacific League pennant since 1981, sweeping the Fukuoka SoftBank Hawks in the playoffs to reach the Japanese championship series against the Chunichi Dragons. The Fighters beat the Dragons in 5 games to win the Japanese championship series.

He became a free agent in 2006, and signed a four-year contract with the Yomiuri Giants during the off-season.

Following 6 successful years with the Giants, Ogasawara would move to the Chunichi Dragons in 2013 and retired with the team at the conclusion of the 2015 season.

== Post-retirement and coaching career ==
Following retirement, Ogasawara was instated as the head coach of the Chunichi Dragons' minor league team, playing in the Western League. Following the dismissal of first team manager, Motonobu Tanishige on 8 August, 2016 Ogasawara was mentioned as the main candidate to replace the outgoing manager at the season's end. He was however unsuccessful in attaining the manager position as senior figures at the Dragons decided to appoint a more experienced manager in Shigekazu Mori to help rebuild the team.

On 29 September 2019, it was announced that Ogasawara would not be renewing his contract with the Dragons for the 2020 season with speculation linking him with the vacant Nippon Ham Fighters managerial position.

== See also ==
- List of top Nippon Professional Baseball home run hitters
- List of Nippon Professional Baseball players with 1,000 runs batted in
- List of Nippon Professional Baseball career hits leaders
