= Alex Cabrera =

Venezuelan baseball player (born 1971)

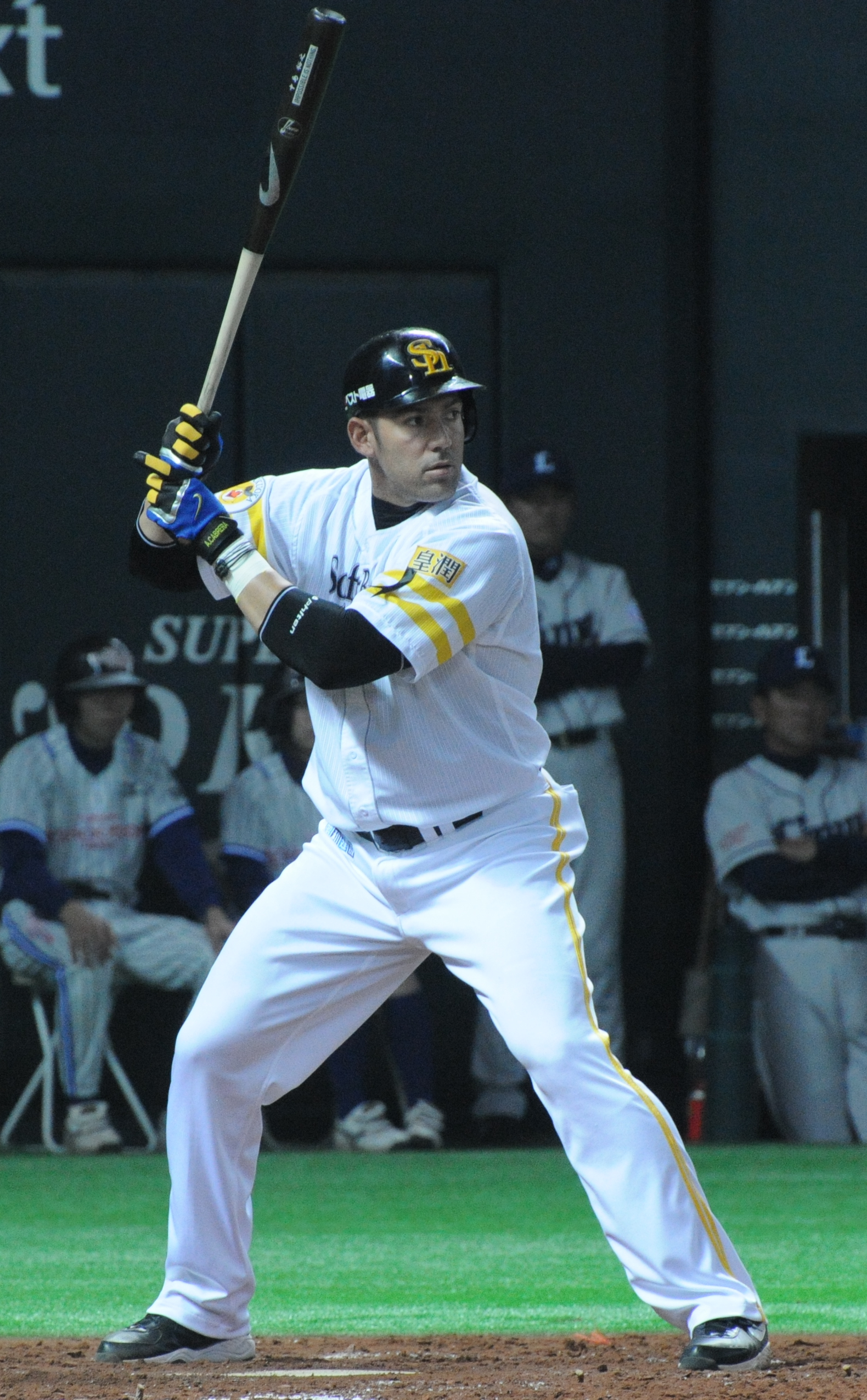
- Cabrera with the Fukuoka SoftBank Hawks in 2011

Marineros de Carabobo
- First baseman / Coach
- Born: December 24, 1971 (age 54); Caripito, Monagas State, Venezuela
- Batted: Right Threw: Right

Professional debut
- MLB: June 26, 2000, for the Arizona Diamondbacks
- NPB: March 24, 2001, for the Seibu Lions

Last appearance
- MLB: September 30, 2000, for the Arizona Diamondbacks
- NPB: June 17, 2012, for the Fukuoka SoftBank Hawks

MLB statistics
- Batting average: .263
- Home runs: 5
- Runs batted in: 14

NPB statistics
- Batting average: .303
- Home runs: 357
- Runs batted in: 949
- Stats at Baseball Reference

Teams
- Arizona Diamondbacks (2000); Seibu Lions (2001–2007); Orix Buffaloes (2008–2010); Fukuoka SoftBank Hawks (2011–2012)

Career highlights and awards
- 5× NPB All-Star (2001-2003, 2006, 2007); 5× Best Nine Award (2002, 2003, 2007, 2008, 2010); Golden Glove Award (2008); Pacific League MVP (2002); 2× Japan Series champion (2004, 2011)

Alexander Alberto Cabrera (born December 24, 1971) is a Venezuelan former first baseman and right-handed batter who played in 2000 for the Arizona Diamondbacks in Major League Baseball (MLB) and for 12 seasons in Nippon Professional Baseball (NPB). He also played several seasons in the Mexican League and the Venezuelan Professional Baseball League (LVBP). He is the hitting coach for the Marineros de Carabobo of the Venezuelan Major League.

After his one season in MLB, Cabrera enjoyed great success in Japan. He tied a single-season home run record, hitting 55 home runs in 2002 and winning the Pacific League MVP. He was also a five-time All-Star in Japan. However, he tested positive for performance-enhancing drugs several times and faced additional accusations of using steroids.

== Career ==
Cabrera signed with the Chicago Cubs as an amateur free agent in 1991 and played in their minor league system through 1996. He moved to the Mexican League, playing for Potros de Minatitlán and Tigres Capitalinos in 1997 and returning to the Tigres in 1998. He attended spring training with the Tampa Bay Devil Rays before the 1998 season. He played for the Koos Group Whales in the CPBL in Taiwan in 1999, then signed with the Arizona Diamondbacks in 2000.

After nine seasons in the minors, Cabrera finally reached the majors with the Diamondbacks. A muscular slugger, Cabrera hit a home run in his first at-bat. He ended the 2000 MLB season with a .262 average, five home runs, 14 RBI, 10 runs, and a .500 slugging percentage in 31 games.

=== Seibu Lions ===
After the 2000 season, the Seibu Lions of the Japan Pacific League purchased his contract from Arizona.

In 2001, Cabrera batted .282, with 49 home runs and 124 RBI. He was even better in 2002, with a .336 batting average, 55 home runs, and 115 RBI, winning the Pacific League's MVP award. His 55 home runs tied Japan's single-season record, equaling the mark set by Sadaharu Oh in 1964 and matched by former MLB player Tuffy Rhodes in 2001. Cabrera stated that he was unable to break the record because pitchers threw him very few strikes after hitting his 55th home run. Wladimir Balentien later broke the home run record, hitting 60 home runs in 2013.

In 2003, Cabrera hit 50 home runs with 112 RBIs, while batting .324 for Seibu. Injuries limited him to 64 games in 2004, with 25 home runs and 62 RBIs. On October 26, 2004, Cabrera hit a two-run towering homer as the Seibu Lions defeated the Chunichi Dragons 7–2 in Game 7 of the Japan Series to win their first championship since 1992. The ball bounced off the glass-enclosed private boxes above the left field seats at the Nagoya Dome. It was Cabrera's third home run of the series. He also hit a grand slam and a two-run homer in Game 3.

In six seasons with the Lions, Cabrera was a .308 hitter with 246 home runs and 605 RBI in 708 games.

=== Orix Buffaloes ===
In January 2008, Cabrera signed a one-year contract with the Orix Buffaloes. The contract reportedly required that Cabrera pass a drug test when he reported to the team in February. He obtained free agency rights following the 2009 season after playing 8 years in Japan, thereby removing the designation as a "foreign player," becoming the fourth non-Japanese player to obtain such classification in NPB.

In three seasons with Orix from 2008 through 2010, Cabrera slugged 73 home runs with 225 RBIs. Cabrera's career in NPB ended with 97 games over two seasons for the Fukuoka SoftBank Hawks in 2011 and 2012.

=== Mexican and Venezuelan leagues ===
After leaving Japan, Cabrera continued to play professional winter league baseball for Tiburones de La Guaira in his native Venezuela. In 59 games during the 2013–14 season, Cabrera batted .391, with a record-setting 21 home runs (currently shared with Renato Núñez, who tied the record in 2024). Cabrera broke the league single season home run record set by Bo Díaz, who hit 20 home runs in 1979–80. Cabrera played 14 games for Rojos del Aguila de Veracruz in the Mexican League in April 2014 at the age of 42, batting .404 and hitting 4 home runs. He continued to play in the Venezuelan winter league until 2016–2017, playing 4 games in his final season with Tigres de Aragua.

In May 2025, Cabrera joined Clemente Álvarez's coaching staff as the hitting coach for the Marineros de Carabobo of the Venezuelan Major League, a summer professional league.

== Steroid and performance-enhancing drug allegations ==
On December 13, 2007, Cabrera was linked to steroid use in the Mitchell Report, one of many MLB players so identified. The report detailed an incident in September 2000 when Cabrera on the Arizona Diamondbacks. Team officials found a package that contained a vial of what they suspected to be anabolic steroids and several hundred pills. Clubhouse attendants claimed the package was intended for Cabrera. The contents of the package were tested, and it was determined that the vial contained the anabolic steroid Winstrol, but the pills were legal, over-the-counter diet pills. Before the tests came back, however, Cabrera's contract had been sold to the Seibu Lions, so he was never tested for steroid use. Cabrera denied knowing why the package had been addressed to him.

After the report came out, Cabrera denied ever using steroids.

"I couldn't have used the substances that are identified. I never had possession of the alleged box that supposedly contained the pharmaceutical drugs."

During his career in Japan, Cabrera never tested positive for performance-enhancing drugs. In 2013, he stated that he never injected himself with or smoked drugs.

In 2014, Cabrera tested positive for stanozolol, which ended his career in the Mexican League. A Mexican sports court later suspended his permanent ban from the league.

In 2016, Cabrera tested positive for adderall while playing in the LVBP. His suspension was overturned by a Venezuelan court later in 2016. He tested positive for stanozolol in December 2016, receiving a 50-game suspension from the LVBP.

== Personal life ==
Cabrera's son Ramón also played in Major League Baseball. The younger Cabrera, a switch-hitting catcher, signed with the Pittsburgh Pirates organization in 2008, at the age of 18. Ramón made his major league debut with the Cincinnati Reds on September 5, 2015. Cabrera played against his son in some winter league games.

== See also ==
- List of Major League Baseball players from Venezuela
- List of Major League Baseball players named in the Mitchell Report
- List of top Nippon Professional Baseball home run hitters
