= Cleanup hitter =

Baseball position

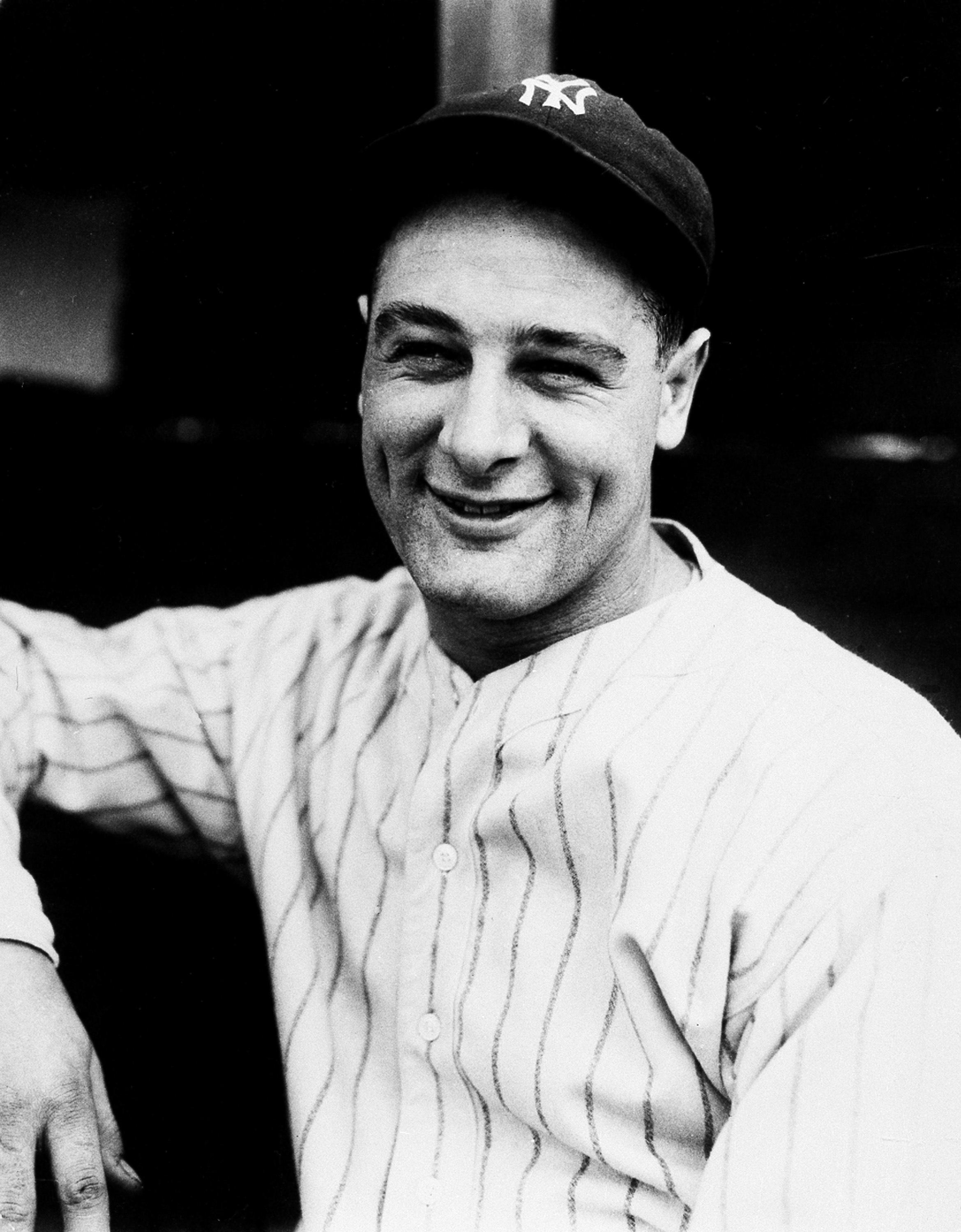
Lou Gehrig, with 1,515 runs batted in as a cleanup hitter, has "cleaned up" the most bases of any cleanup hitter in Major League Baseball history.

In baseball, a cleanup hitter is the fourth hitter in the batting order. The cleanup hitter is traditionally the team's most powerful hitter. His job is to "clean up the bases", that is, drive in base runners.

== Theory ==
The thinking behind the use of the cleanup hitter is that at least one of the batters before him will reach base somehow, usually via a walk or a base hit. Traditionally, the lead off hitter, the number one spot in the batting order, has good foot speed, plate discipline, and a high on-base percentage. The second batter is usually a contact hitter, meaning he is able to consistently make contact with the ball and put it in play to move base runners forward and into scoring position. The first or second batter might bunt his way on base as they both will be speedy runners. The third batter is usually the best batter, the hitter with the highest batting average. He has the role of scoring runs himself, but his job comes down to getting on base for the cleanup hitter to have a turn to bat in the same inning. The cleanup hitter coming up to hit—if he has runners on base—has the opportunity to produce runs by getting a base hit or a home run. The third and fourth batters tend to be interchangeable in the batting order. The fifth batter in the lineup also has the job of batting in runs, in effect a backup for the cleanup hitter. He shares multiple traits with the cleanup hitter and therefore can compete for the cleanup hitter's spot in the batting order. Batters six to nine typically descend in batting skill level, meaning that the ninth batter is often the least effective batter in the lineup.

== Trends ==
Each individual hitter's strengths and weaknesses determine their spot on the daily lineup card. As the number four hitter's primary responsibility is to turn base runners into runs, a hitter with a high slugging percentage and batting average, especially with runners in scoring position, is generally preferred to the higher on-base percentage (OBP) and low strikeout rates of hitters earlier in the lineup. A manager may also take into account a batters tendency to hit in clutch situations or focus on home run ability. Since the home run is by far the most sure-fire method of batting in baserunners, the annual Home Run Derby tends to be a who's who of cleanup hitters from around the league. That being said, a hitter with an unspectacular home run rate who is instead reliable when it comes to extra-base hits can also be a valuable tool for scoring with runners in scoring position (RISP). It is ultimately a question of how well a player fits into the rest of the lineup which determines the run-scoring potential of the cleanup spot.

== Designated Hitter ==
The designated hitter (DH) is a batter that hits for the pitcher and never plays defense. The DH is important because the DH is usually one of the better hitters. It is a trend that the DH is either in the third, fourth, or fifth spot in the lineup. The DH was adopted by the American League of North American Major League Baseball in 1973 and by the National League in 2022. In games without a DH, the pitcher hit in the lineup unless another player pinch hit for the pitcher, in which case the pitcher left the game and was replaced for the team's next defensive half-inning. Between 1973 and 2022, when there were interleague games and the National League was the home team, the American League team did not use a DH, and their pitchers took their turn at bat.

== Records ==
Key
*	Member of the Baseball Hall of Fame.

=== Most runs batted in as cleanup hitter ===
Below is a list of Major League Baseball players with the most runs batted in (RBI) from the cleanup spot as of the end of the 2020 season.

Rank	Player	RBI
1	Lou Gehrig *	1,515
2	Eddie Murray *	1,340
3	Fred McGriff *	1,224
4	Manny Ramirez	1,215
5	Joe DiMaggio *	1,207
6	Al Simmons *	1,206
7	Albert Belle	1,184
8	Jim Bottomley *	1,167
9	Willie Stargell *	1,131
10	Carlos Delgado	1,112

=== Most games played as cleanup hitter ===
Below is a list of Major League Baseball players with the most games played in the cleanup spot as of the end of the 2020 season.

Rank	Player	G
1	Eddie Murray *	2,041
2	Fred McGriff *	1,826
3	Honus Wagner *	1,812
4	Willie McCovey *	1,622
5	Lou Gehrig *	1,545
6	Willie Stargell *	1,535
7	Jim Bottomley *	1,525
8	Greg Luzinski	1,521
9	Dave Winfield *	1,484
10	Nap Lajoie *	1,458

=== Most plate appearances as cleanup hitter ===
Below is a list of Major League Baseball players with the most plate appearances from the cleanup spot as of the end of the 2020 season.

Rank	Player	PA
1	Eddie Murray *	8,775
2	Fred McGriff *	7,777
3	Honus Wagner *	7,708
4	Lou Gehrig *	7,004
5	Jim Bottomley *	6,742
6	Willie McCovey *	6,659
7	Willie Stargell *	6,545
8	Greg Luzinski	6,477
9	Dave Winfield *	6,351
10	Albert Belle	6,332
