= Dalley =

Dalley is a surname. Notable people with the surname include:

- Amy Dalley (born 1981), American country singer-songwriter
- Bill Dalley (1901–1989), New Zealand rugby player
- Denver Dalley, American singer-songwriter
- Derrick Dalley (born 1965), Canadian politician
- Geoff Dalley (1917–1992), Australian footballer
- Gifford Dalley, 18th-century American politician
- Helen Dalley (born 1957), Australian journalist
- Horace Dalley (born 1950), Jamaican politician
- John Dalley (born 1935), American classical violinist
- John Bede Dalley (1876–1935), Australian journalist and writer
- Kaedi Dalley, American contralto vocalist and member of Citizen Queen
- Ma Dalley (1880–1965), Australian businesswoman and politician
- Richard Dalley (born 1957), American ice dancer
- Robert Dalley-Scarlett (1887–1959), Australian organist and choirmaster
- Stephanie Dalley (born 1943), British Assyriologist and scholar of the Ancient Near East.
- William Bede Dalley (1831–1888), Australian politician and barrister
- Winton Dalley, New Zealand politician

== Other ==
- MC Dalley, an alias used by French-American monk Philippe Coupey

== See also ==
- Division of Dalley, former electoral division in New South Wales, Australia
