= Komazawa University =

University in Setagaya, Tokyo, Japan

Coordinates: 35°37′46.7″N 139°39′29.8″E

- 駒澤大学
- Motto: Truth, Sincerity, Respect, and Love (信誠敬愛)
- Type: Private
- Established: 1592 (seminary); 1925 (university)
- President: Ryōkō Hirose
- Administrative staff: 600
- Undergraduates: 14,000
- Postgraduates: 200
- Location: Setagaya, Tokyo, Japan
- Campus: Urban
- Member of: Setagaya 6 Universities consortium
- Colors: bluish-purple
- Website: komazawa-u.ac.jp/english/

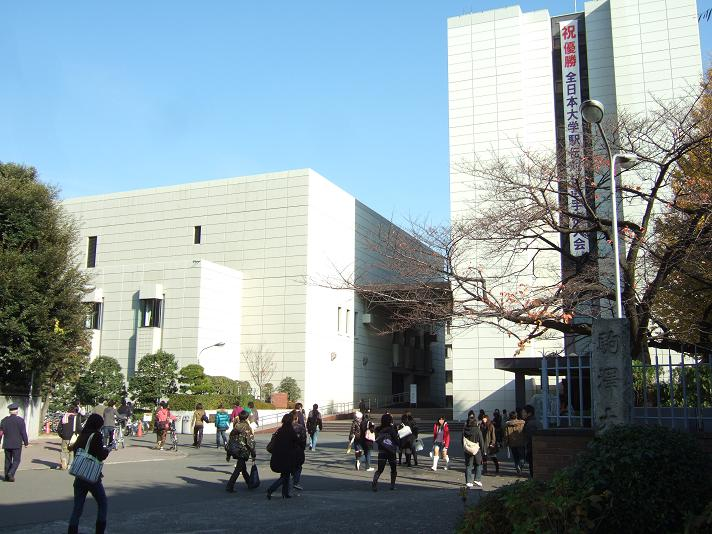
Komazawa campus

Komazawa University (駒澤大学, Komazawa Daigaku), abbreviated as 駒大 Komadai, is a private university in Setagaya, Tokyo, Japan. Its history starts in 1592, when a seminary was established to be a center of learning for the young monks of the Sōtō sect, one of the two main Zen Buddhist traditions in Japan. The seminary evolved into a modern school in the late 19th century, and became a university in 1925.

The university in Tokyo campus comprises seven faculties and 17 departments with a total of around 14,000 students. Also, for students who wish to pursue advanced studies, each department has a graduate school. It also has eleven research institutes and a Museum of Zen Buddhist Culture. Times Higher Education places Komazawa University in the 150+ bracket in its ranking of Japan's 200 best universities.

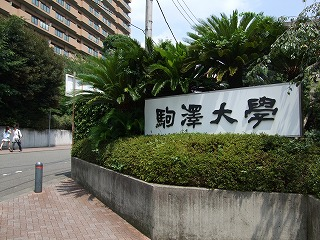
Komazawa campus

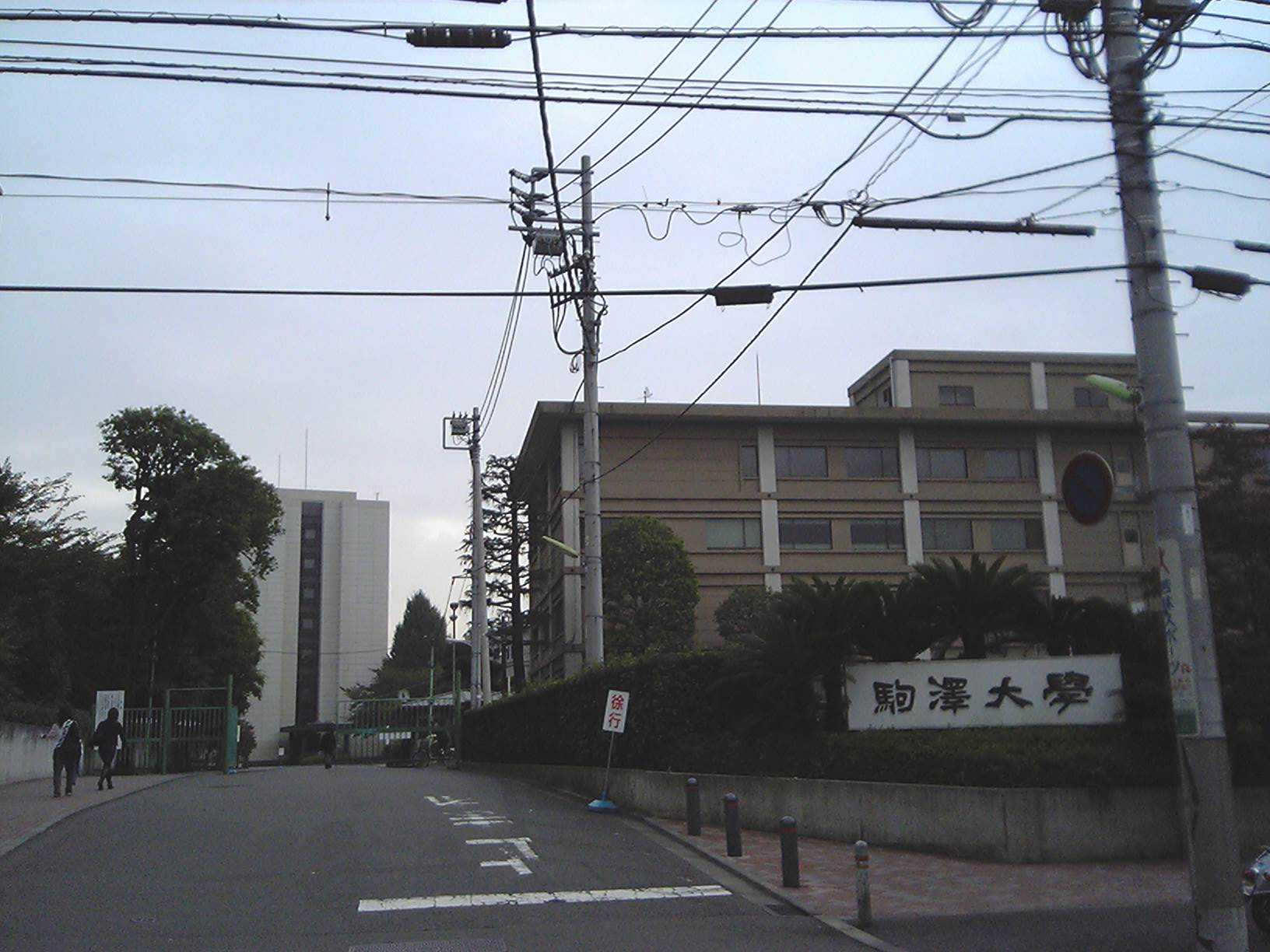
Komazawa campus '2005

== Basic information ==
=== Campuses ===
==== Komazawa campus ====
Komazawa 1-23-1, Setagaya-ku, Tokyo-to (東京都 世田谷区 駒沢1-23-1)

- This campus is next to Komazawa Olympic Park (the stadium of the 1964 Tokyo Olympics).
- Access: Komazawa-daigaku Station (駒沢大学駅)

==== Tamagawa campus ====
Unane 1-1-1, Setagaya-ku, Tokyo-to (東京都 世田谷区 宇奈根1-1-1)

- Access: Futako-Tamagawa Station (二子玉川駅)

==== Fukasawa campus ====
Fukasawa 6-8-18, Setagaya-ku, Tokyo-to (東京都 世田谷区 深沢6-8-18)

- Access: Komazawa-daigaku Station (駒沢大学駅)

=== College Song ===
- Words by Hakushū Kitahara, music by Kōsaku Yamada.

== Education and research ==
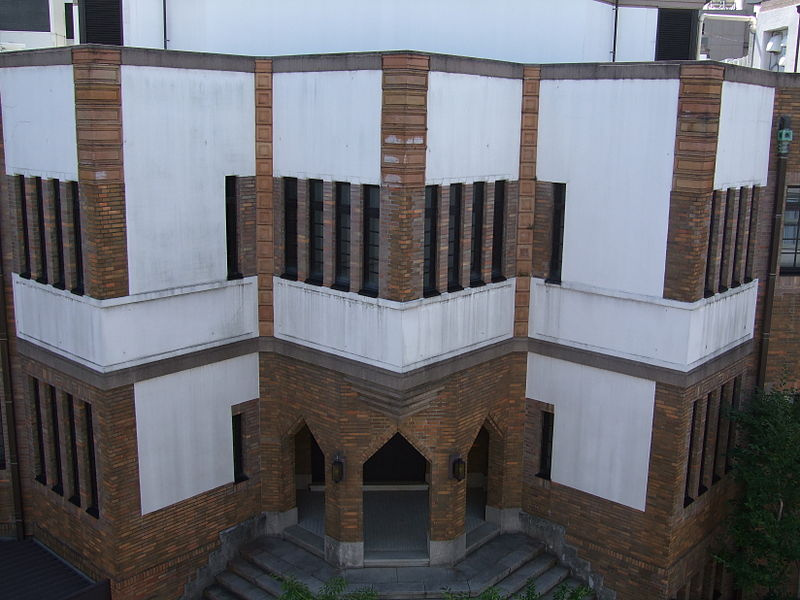
The Museum of Zen Culture and History

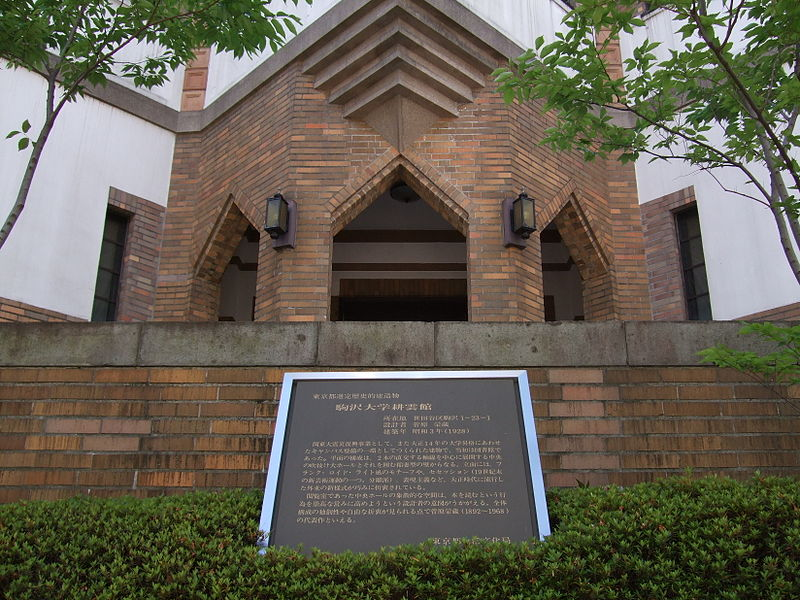
The Museum of Zen Culture and History

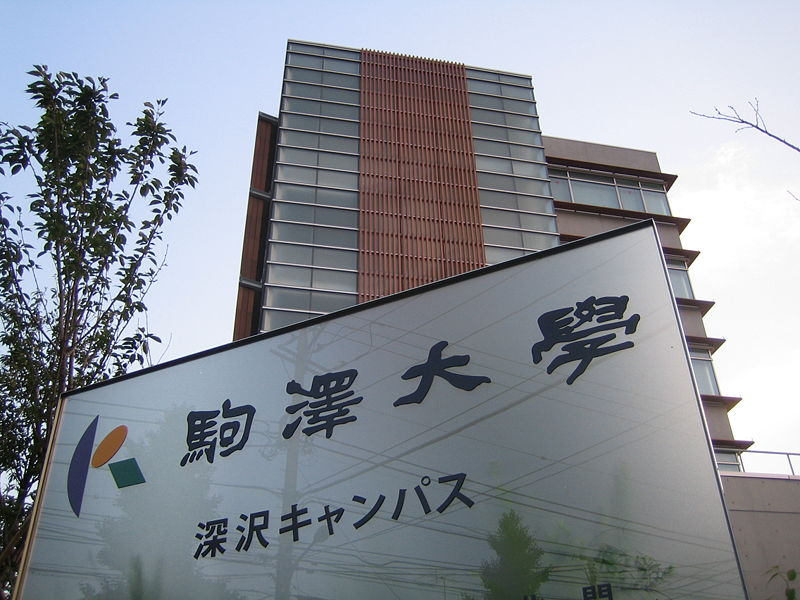
Fukasawa campus

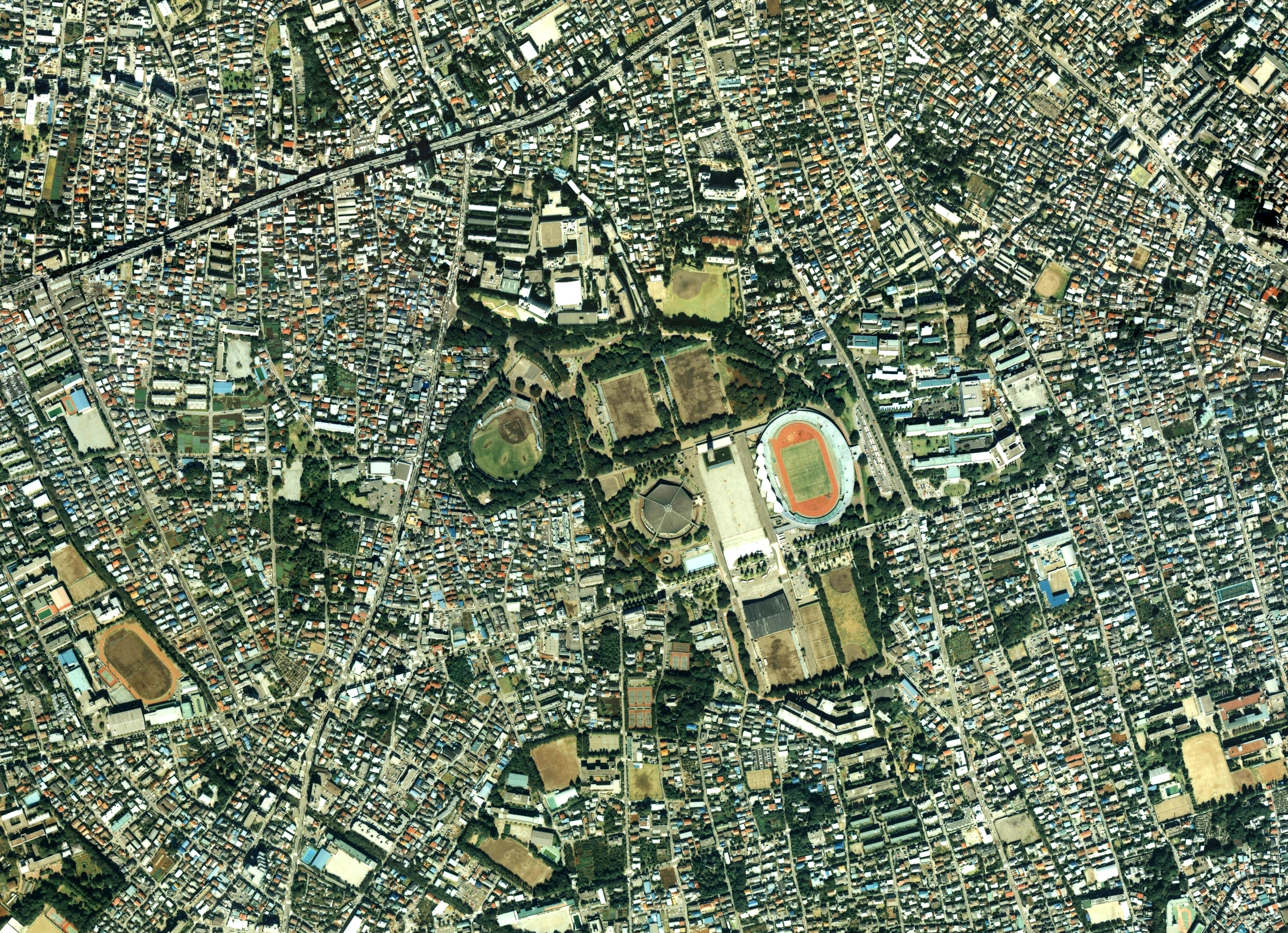
Komazawa Olympic Park & Komazawa Univ. 国土航空写真

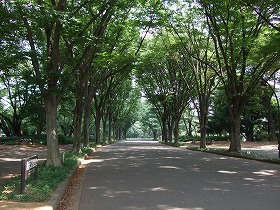
Komazawa Olympic Park

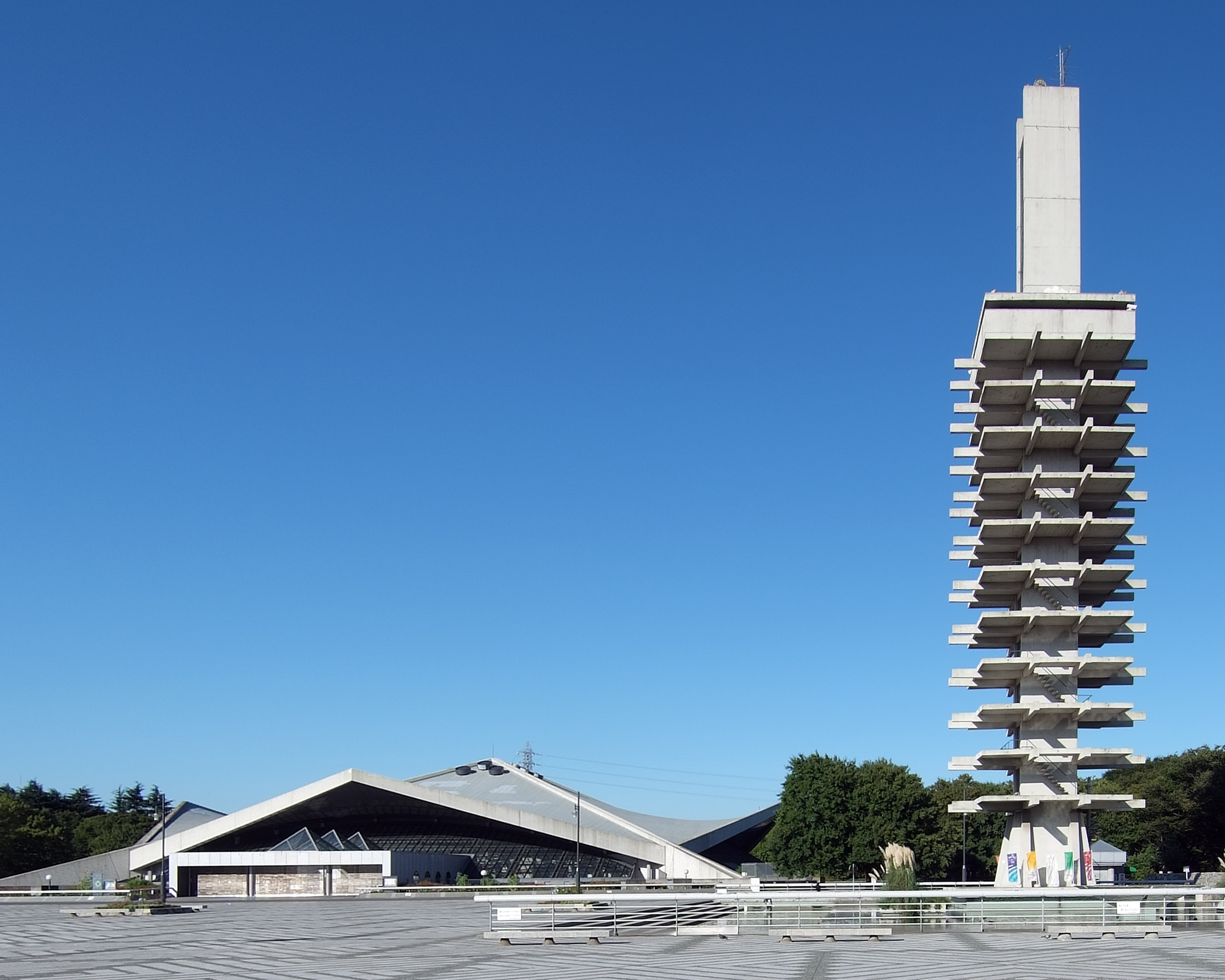
Komazawa Olympic Park

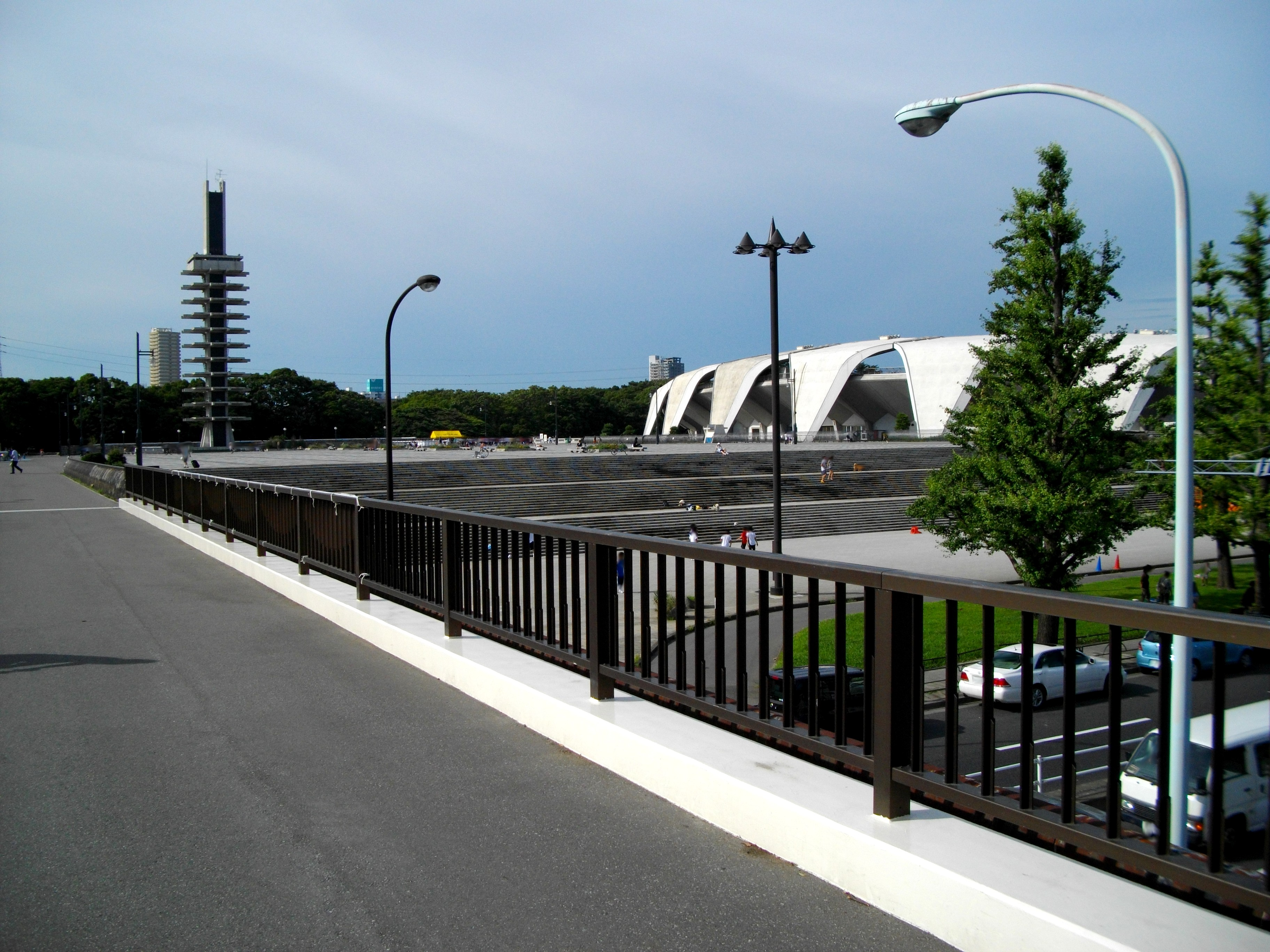
Komazawa Olympic Park

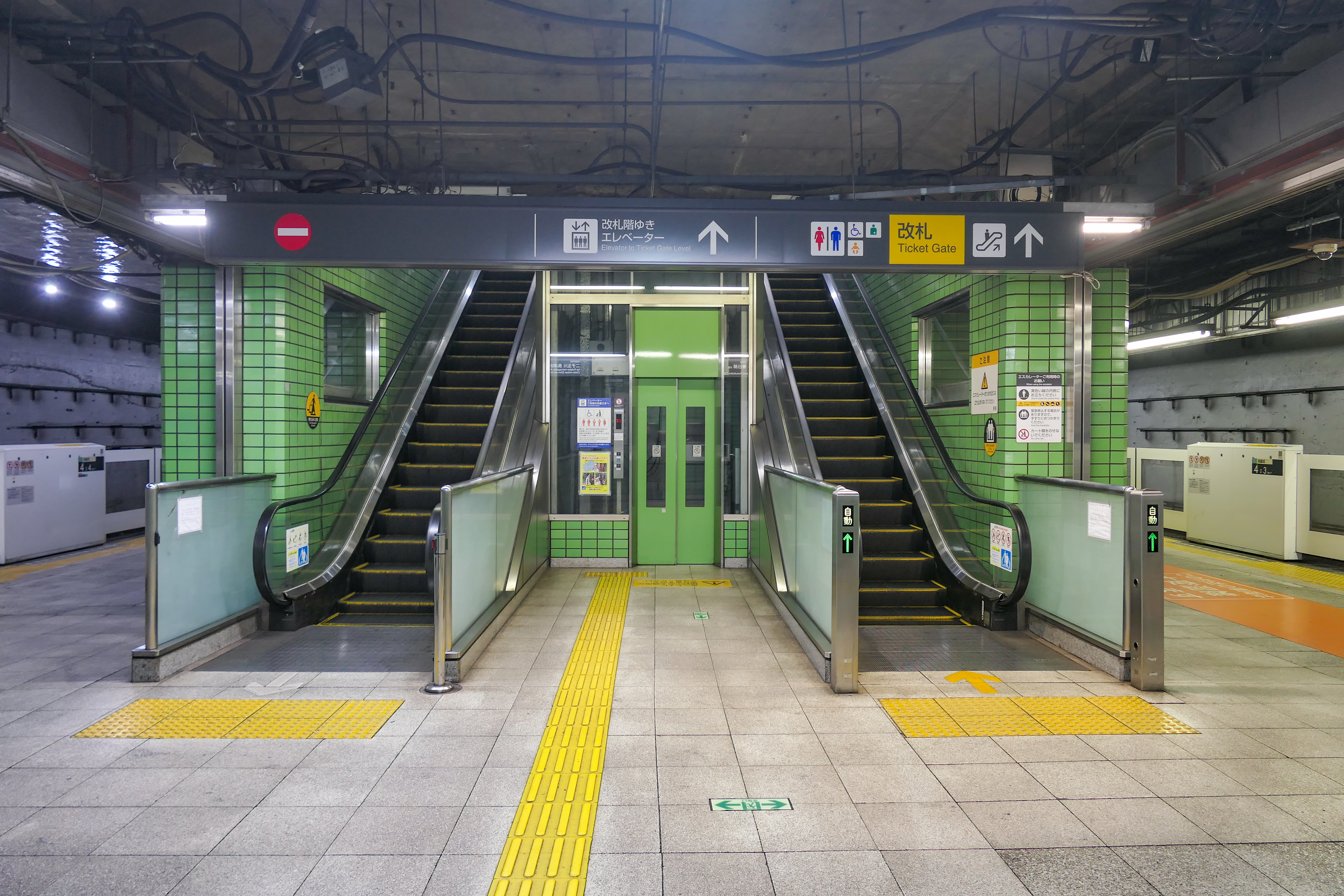
Komazawa-daigaku Station

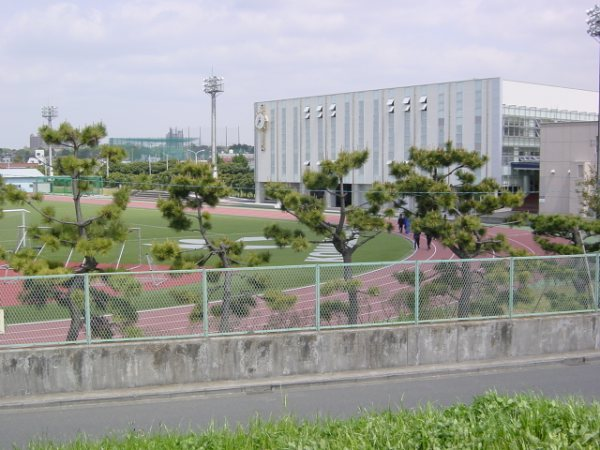
Tamagawa campus '2010

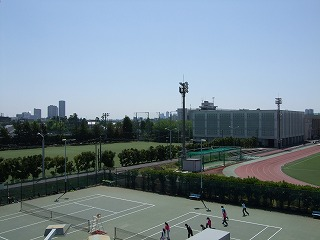
Tamagawa campus

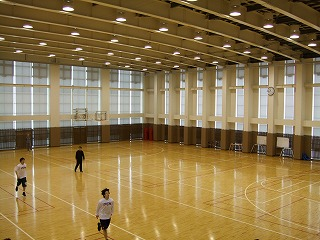
Tamagawa campus '2010

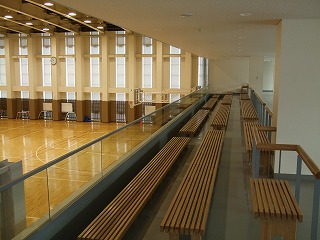
Tamagawa campus

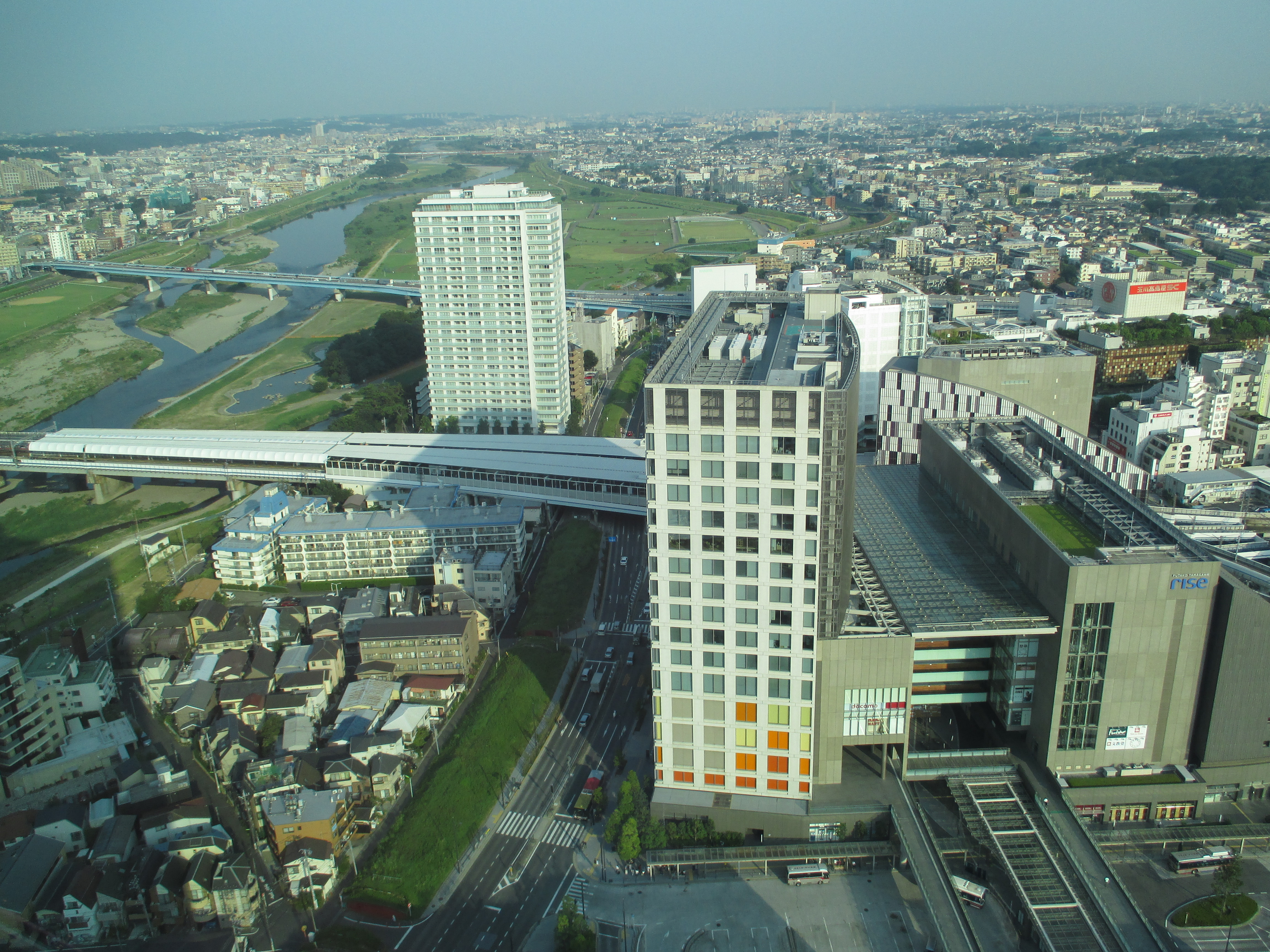
Futako-tamagawa Station and Futako-Tamagawa Rise '2015

=== Departments ===
- Buddhist Studies
  - Zen Buddhist Studies
  - Buddhist Studies
- Literature
  - Japanese Literature
  - English and American Literature
  - Geography
    - Area and Culture Studies
    - Environmental Science
  - History
    - Japanese History
    - Foreign History
    - Archaeology
  - Philosophy
  - Sociology
    - Sociology
    - Social Welfare
- Economics
  - Economics
  - Commerce
  - Applied Economics
- Law
  - Law
  - Political Science
- Business Administration
  - Business Administration
  - Marketing Management
- Health Sciences
  - Radiological Sciences
- Global Media Studies
  - Global Media

=== Graduate programs ===
- Arts and Sciences
  - Buddhist Studies
  - Japanese literature
  - English and American Literature
  - Geography
  - History
    - Japanese History
    - European History
    - History of East Asia
    - Archaeology
  - Sociology
  - Psychology
    - Psychology
    - Certified Clinical Psychology
- Economics
- Commerce
- Law
  - Public Law
  - Private Law
- Business Administration
- Health Sciences
  - Radiological Sciences
- Global Media Studies
  - Global Media

==== Professional graduate programs ====
- Judicial Studies (Law school)

=== Affiliated facilities ===
==== Institute ====
- The Zen Institute
- The Institute of Zen Buddhism and Economics
- The Institute for Comparative Buddhist Literature
- The Institute of Legal Research
- The Research Institute for Applied Geography
- The Research Institute for Accounting
- The Institute of Mass Communication
- The Research Institute for Justice

== Facilities ==
- Komazawa campus
  - The Museum of Zen Culture and History
  - 246 Kaikan
  - Community Care Center
- Tamagawa campus
- Fukasawa campus

== Student life ==
=== Societies ===
There are over 160 clubs and organizations in Komazawa University.

==== Football ====
The football team plays as one of the Kantō Collegiate Football League (ja:関東大学サッカー連盟)

==== Baseball ====
The baseball team belongs to the "Tohto University Baseball League". (東都大学野球リーグ)

==== Ekiden ====
The Komazawa Univ. ekiden team won the "Hakone Ekiden" in 2000, 2002, 2003, 2004, 2005, 2008, 2021, and 2023.

- " Big Three collegiate ekiden competitions " (三大大学駅伝) are as follows:
  - Izumo Ekiden (出雲駅伝)
  - All-Japan Collegiate (Men's) Ekiden Championship (全日本大学駅伝)
  - Hakone Ekiden (箱根駅伝)

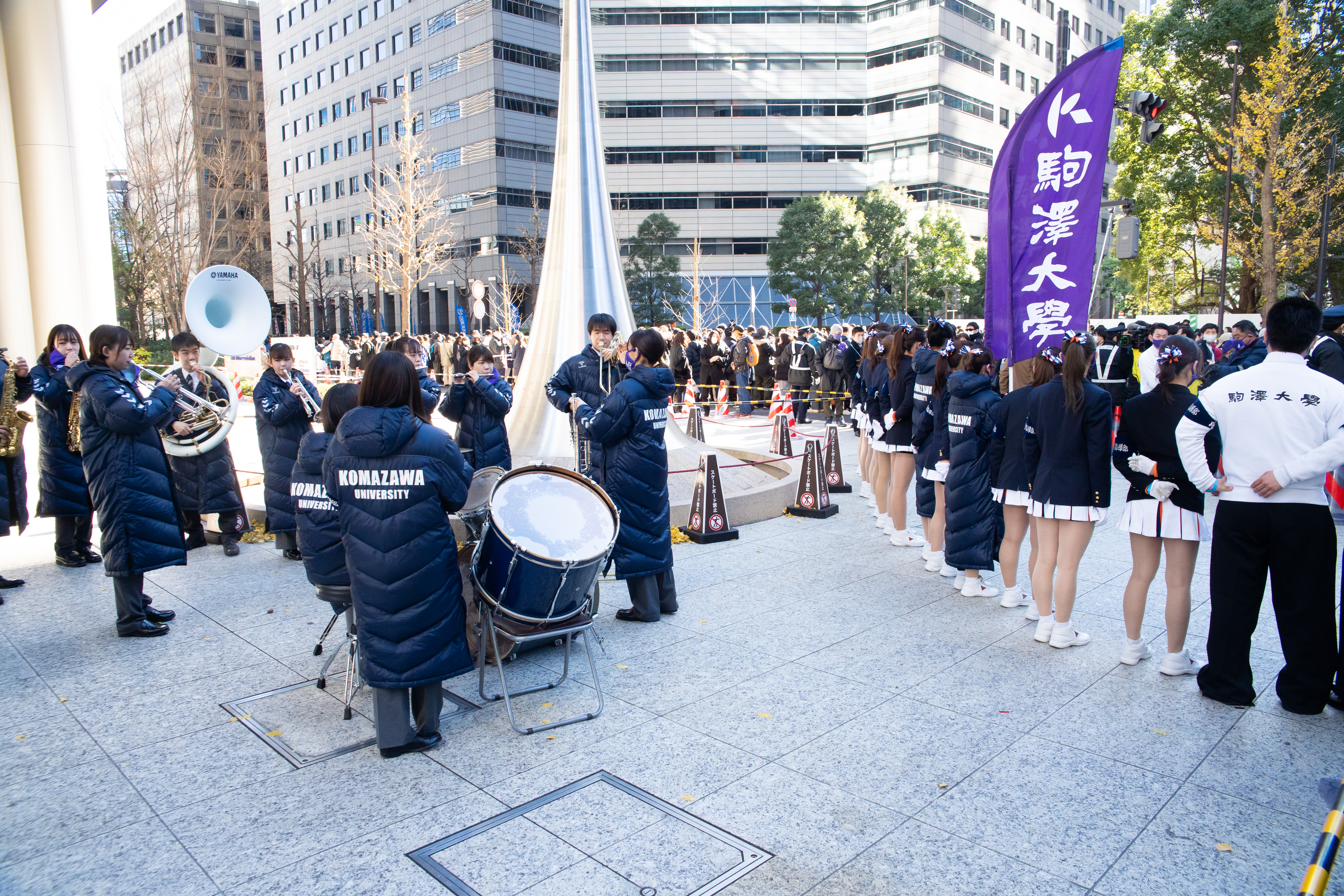
Hakone Ekiden 2023

==== Others ====
- Karate
- Boxing
- American football ("Blue Tide"): "Kantoh Collegiate American Football Association" (関東学生アメリカンフットボール連盟)
- Ice hockey
- Basketball
- Tennis
- Cheerleading ("Blue Jays"): "Foundation of Japan Cheerleading Association" (日本チアリーディング協会)
- Cheerleading ("Blue Pegasus")
- Brass band
- Orchestra
- Chorus
- Rakugo

=== Festivals ===
- Autumn festival: Cultural festival (Japan)
- Tenmasai (天馬祭) by Blue Pegasus (応援指導部ブルーペガス)

== People ==
=== Presidents ===
- Reirin Yamada
- Hakujyu Ui
- Kogen Mizuno

=== Alumni ===
- Dainin Katagiri (片桐大忍), Sōtō Zen priest, founding abbot of the Minnesota Zen Center
- Kobun Chino Otogawa (乙川弘文), Sōtō Zen priest
- Shōhaku Okumura (奥村正博), Dōgenist
- Shunryu Suzuki (鈴木俊隆), Sōtō Zen priest
- Soyu Matsuoka (松岡操雄), Founder of Zen Buddhist Temple of Chicago
- Taizan Maezumi Rōshi (前角博雄), Soto Zen priest
- Brian Victoria, educator, Doctor of Philosophy, writer and Buddhist priest in the Sōtō Zen sect
- Yuko Okumura, Kesa descendent
- Noriaki Hakamaya (袴谷憲昭), professor of Komazawa University
- Reirin Yamada (山田霊林), professor, president
- Stanley Weinstein (スタンリー・ワインスタイン), honorary professor of Yale University
- Shiro Matsumoto (松本史朗), professor of Komazawa University
- Sodō Mori (森祖道), professor of Aichi Gakuin University
- William Bodiford (ウィリアム・ボディフォード), professor of University of California, Los Angeles
- Atsushi Watanabe (渡部篤), member of the House of Representatives in the Diet
- Naoto Ohtsuki (大朏直人), founder of Onkyo
- Masaru Kawaguchi (川口勝), vice president of Bandai Namco Holdings, president of Bandai Spirits Co.
- Kazumasa Terada (寺田和正), founder of Samantha Thavasa
- Hiroaki Ito (伊東宏晃), president of Avex Management Inc.
- Shinji Hashimoto (橋本真司), game producer
- Katsuoki Enomoto (榎本勝起), Announcer of Tokyo Broadcasting System Television
- Sen Odagiri (小田切千), Announcer of NHK
- Heitaro Ohhama (大浜平太郎), Commentator, Announcer of TV Tokyo
- Tatsuya Kato (journalist) (加藤達也), journalist
- Mitsuo Shindō (信藤三雄), art director, photographer, film director and producer, music video director and calligraphist
- Tatsushi Ōmori (大森立嗣), film director and actor
- Izuru Narushima (成島出), scriptwriter and film director *
- Kenta Kiritani (桐谷健太), actor *
- Takeo Nakahara (中原丈雄), actor
- Yuma Nakayama (中山優馬), actor *
- Kōhei Yamamoto (山本康平), actor
- Ito Bungaku (伊藤文學), entrepreneur, founder and editor
- Daisuke Satō (佐藤大輔), board game designer, novelist, and manga writer
- Hitoshi Okuda (奥田ひとし), manga artist
- Yōsuke Takahashi (高橋葉介), horror manga artist
- Michiru Jo (城みちる), singer *
- Yoshiyuki Ohsawa (大澤誉志幸), singer, songwriter, music producer
- Toshinobu Kubota (久保田利伸), singer, songwriter, music producer
- Masatoshi Sato (佐藤雅俊), Bassist, member of Acidman
- Shinji Wajima (和嶋慎治), Guitarist and vocalist, member of Ningen Isu
- Hiroki Yasumoto (安元洋貴), voice actor
- Suzuko Mimori (三森すずこ), voice actor *
- Yūsei Oda (織田優成), voice actor
- Toshihiko Seki (関俊彦), voice actor
- Masaharu Satō (佐藤正治), voice actor *
- Nobuo Tobita (飛田展男), voice actor *
- Chiharu Sawashiro (沢城千春), voice actor
- Ryōhei Arai (新井良平), voice actor
- Haruka Kato (加藤悠), gravure idol, tarento, and professional wrestler
- Reina Kubo (久保玲奈), singer
- Kinichi Hagimoto (萩本欽一), comedian *

Sports

- Satoru Sakuma (佐久間悟), former football player and manager
- Toshiya Miura (三浦俊也), football manager
- Susumu Watanabe (渡邉晋), former football player and manager
- Tetsumasa Kimura (木村哲昌), football manager
- Kentaro Hayashi (林健太郎), football player
- Keisuke Kurihara (栗原圭介), football player
- Takuya Yamada (山田卓也), football player
- Atsushi Nagai (永井篤志), football player *
- Makoto Kaneko (footballer) (金子誠), football player
- Atsushi Yoneyama (米山篤志), football player
- Jun Uchida (内田潤), football player
- Yoshiyuki Kobayashi (小林慶行), football player
- Akinori Kosaka (小阪昭典), football player
- Teruaki Kobayashi (小林久晃), football player
- Makoto Kimura (木村誠), football player
- Seiichiro Maki (巻誠一郎), football player
- Masaki Fukai (深井正樹), football player
- Daisuke Nasu (那須大亮), football player
- Ryo Kobayashi (小林亮), football player
- Yuki Maki (巻佑樹), football player
- Masaki Chugo (中後雅喜), football player
- Tomonobu Hiroi (廣井友信), football player
- Yosuke Komuta (小牟田洋佑), football player
- Masanobu Komaki (小牧成亘), football player
- Tatsuki Kobayashi (小林竜樹), football player
- Kosuke Kikuchi (菊地光将), football player
- Kim Jung-ya (金正也), football player
- Yusuke Kawagishi (川岸祐輔), football player
- Sai Kanakubo (金久保彩), football player
- Makito Ito (伊藤槙人), football player
- Shota Kikuchi (菊池将太), football player
- Wataru Ise (伊勢渉), football player
- Junya Takahashi (高橋潤哉), football player
- Kyowaan Hoshi (星キョーワァン), football player
- Akihiko Ohya (大矢明彦), retired professional baseball player
- Kiyoshi Nakahata (中畑清), retired professional baseball player
- Shigekazu Mori (森繁和), retired professional baseball player
- Hiromichi Ishige (石毛宏典), retired professional baseball player
- Kazuyuki Shirai (白井 一幸), professional baseball player
- Kenjiro Nomura (baseball) (野村謙二郎), professional baseball player
- Masanori Taguchi (田口昌徳), professional baseball player
- Hiroyuki Takagi (高木浩之), professional baseball player
- Hisanori Takahashi (高橋尚成), major League baseball pitcher
- Tsuyoshi Kawagishi (川岸強), professional baseball pitcher
- Hisashi Takeda (武田久), professional baseball pitcher
- Takahiro Arai (新井貴浩), professional baseball player
- Naoto Inada (稲田直人), professional baseball player
- Eishin Soyogi (梵英心), professional baseball player
- Takuya Furuya (古谷拓哉), professional baseball player
- Ryota Arai (新井良太), professional baseball player
- Yōhei Ōshima (大島洋平), professional baseball player
- Hiroyuki Shirasaki (白崎浩之), professional baseball player
- Yasutaka Tobashira (戸柱恭孝), professional baseball player
- Taiga Egoshi (江越大賀), professional baseball player
- Shōta Imanaga (今永昇太), professional baseball player
- Yūsuke Kinoshita (木下雄介), professional baseball player *
- Gakuto Wakabayashi (若林楽人), professional baseball player
- Kōsuke Ukai (鵜飼航丞), professional baseball player
- Hiromi Itoh (伊藤大海), professional baseball player *
- Atsushi Fujita (藤田敦史), long-distance runner
- Takayuki Nishida (西田隆維), long-distance runner
- Nao Kazami (風見尚), long-distance runner, 100 km record holder
- Shogo Nakamura (runner) (中村匠吾), long-distance runner
- Kenta Murayama (村山謙太), long-distance runner
- Kohei Futaoka (二岡康平), long-distance runner
- Yusuke Nishiyama (runner) (西山雄介), long-distance runner
- Shigeo Nakajima (中島成雄), professional boxer, WBC junior flyweight champion
- Satoshi Shimizu (清水聡), professional boxer,|2012 London medalist
- Masayuki Ito (伊藤雅雪), professional boxer, WBO featherweight champion
- Ryomei Tanaka (田中亮明), Japanese boxer,|2021 Tokyo medalist
- Amanoyama Shizuo (天ノ山静雄), sumo wrestler
- Shōhōzan Yūya (松鳳山裕也), sumo wrestler
- Hajime Meshiai (飯合肇), professional golfer
- Shoko Kashiki (樫木祥子), professional racing cyclist
- Ami Yuasa (湯浅亜実), breakdancer
- Sanshiro Takagi (高木三四郎), professional wrestler
- Kinya Oyanagi (大柳錦也), professional wrestler
- Makoto Majima (馬島誠), ice sledge hockey player and para powerlifter

* Did not graduate.

- and see:
  - List of Komazawa related people from Japanese Wikipedia

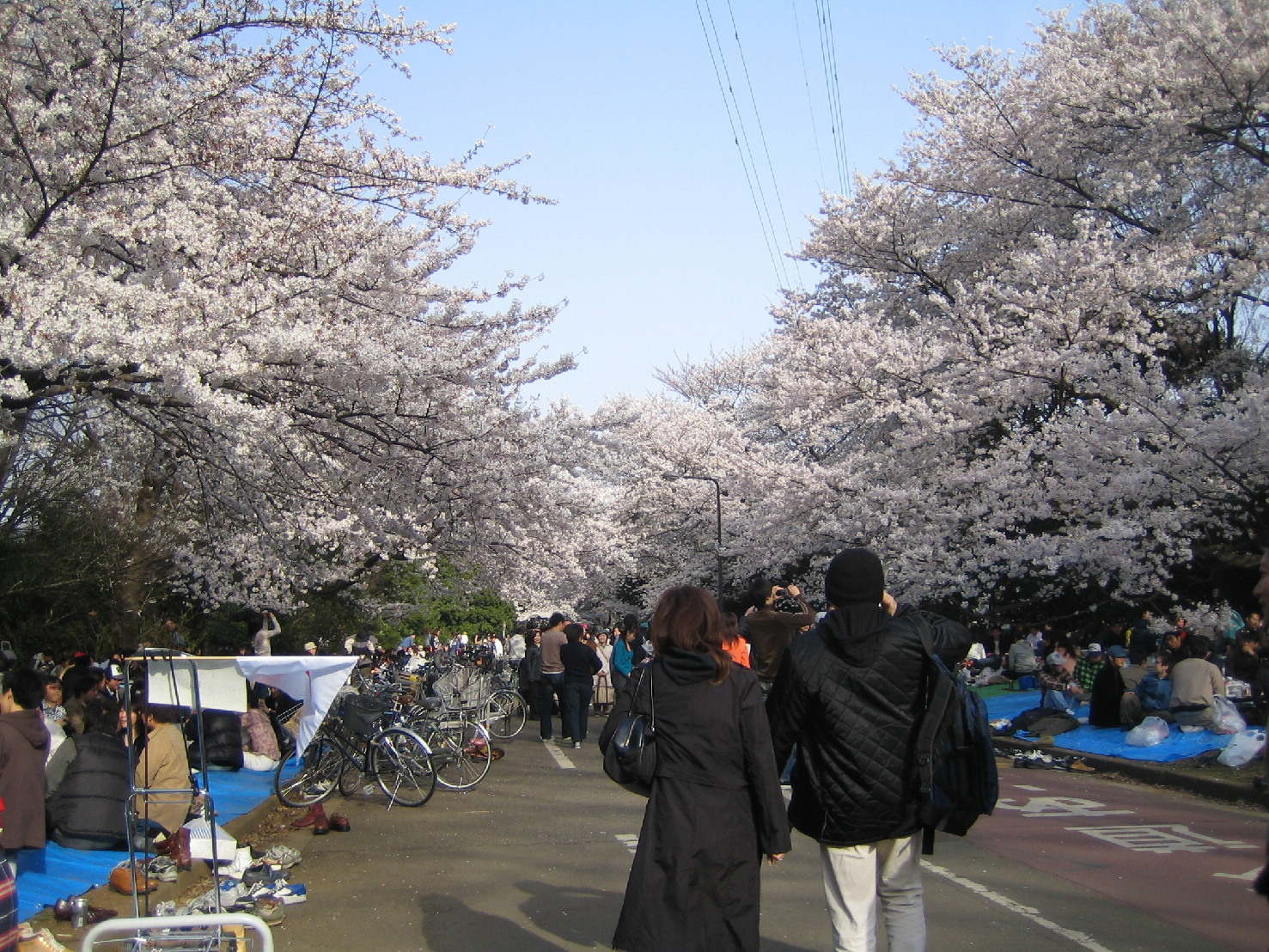
Komazawa Olympic Park in spring

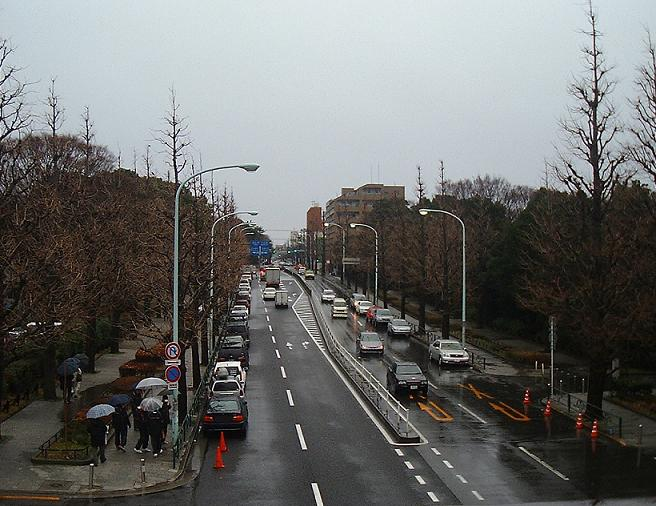
Komazawa Olympic Park・Komazawa-Dōri

== External relations ==
=== International exchanges ===
- University of Exeter, UK
- Kingston University, UK
- University of Queensland, Australia
- Griffith University, Australia
- University of California, Irvine, USA
- California State University, Los Angeles, USA
- University of Hawaii at Manoa, USA
- Arkansas Tech University, USA
- University of British Columbia, Canada
- University of Provence, France
- Peking University, China
- East China Normal University, China
- Tamkang University, Taiwan
- Dongguk University, South Korea
- Cairo University, Egypt

=== Agreements with other universities ===
==== Setagaya Six Universities Consortium ====
Participants in the Setagaya 6 Universities Consortium (世田谷6大学コンソーシアム " Setagaya Roku Daigaku Konsōshiamu ") are as follows:

- Kokushikan University
- Seijo University
- Showa Women's University
- Tokyo University of Agriculture
- Tokyo City University

=== Sister schools ===
- Tohoku Fukushi University
- Aichi Gakuin University
- Tsurumi University
- Komazawa Women's University

They were also established by Soto sect.

== Affiliated schools ==
- Komazawa University Senior High School
- Komazawa University Tomakomai High School

== See also ==
- Komazawa University is known as one of Japan's four famous private universities. "NI-TO-KOMA-SEN" (日東駒専) is the abbreviation that refers to the four private universities in Tokyo.

" Nittokomasen " (日東駒専) are as follows:

  - " 日 " (日本大学): Nihon University
  - " 東 " (東洋大学): Toyo University
  - " 駒 " (駒澤大学): Komazawa University
  - " 専 " (専修大学): Senshu University
- Komazawa-daigaku Station
- Hanazono University, corresponding Rinzai university
