= Kawagishi =

Kawagishi (written: 川岸) is a Japanese surname. Notable people with the surname include:

- Bunzaburō Kawagishi (川岸 文三郎, 1882–1957), Imperial Japanese Army general
- Ryoken Kawagishi (川岸 良兼, born 1966), Japanese golfer
- Tsuyoshi Kawagishi (川岸 強, born 1979), Japanese baseball player
- Yusuke Kawagishi (川岸 祐輔, born 1992), Japanese footballer

== See also ==
- Kawagishi Station, a railway station in Okaya City, Nagano Prefecture, Japan
