= Daishiro Miyazaki =

Japanese footballer

Personal information
- Full name: Daishiro Miyazaki
- Date of birth: April 21, 1983 (age 43)
- Place of birth: Kumamoto, Kumamoto, Japan
- Height: 1.74 m (5 ft 8 1/2 in)
- Position: Midfielder

Youth career
- 2002–2005: Komazawa University

Senior career*
Years	Team	Apps	(Gls)
2006–2009	Roasso Kumamoto	46	(4)
Total		46	(4)
- * Club domestic league appearances and goals

Daishiro Miyazaki (宮崎 大志郎, Miyazaki Daishiro; born April 21, 1983) is a former Japanese football player.

== Career statistics ==
Appearances and goals by club, season and competition
Club	Season	League			Emperor's Cup		Total	
Club	Season	Division	Apps	Goals	Apps	Goals	Apps	Goals
Rosso Kumamoto	2006	Football League	2	0	3	1	5	1
Rosso Kumamoto	2007	Football League	5	1	0	0	5	1
Rosso Kumamoto	2008	J2 League	16	1	0	0	16	1
Rosso Kumamoto	2009	J2 League	23	2	0	0	23	2
Career total			46	4	3	1	49	5
