= Komazawa Olympic Park Stadium =

Sports venue in Tokyo, Japan

Coordinates: 35°37′32″N 139°39′49″E

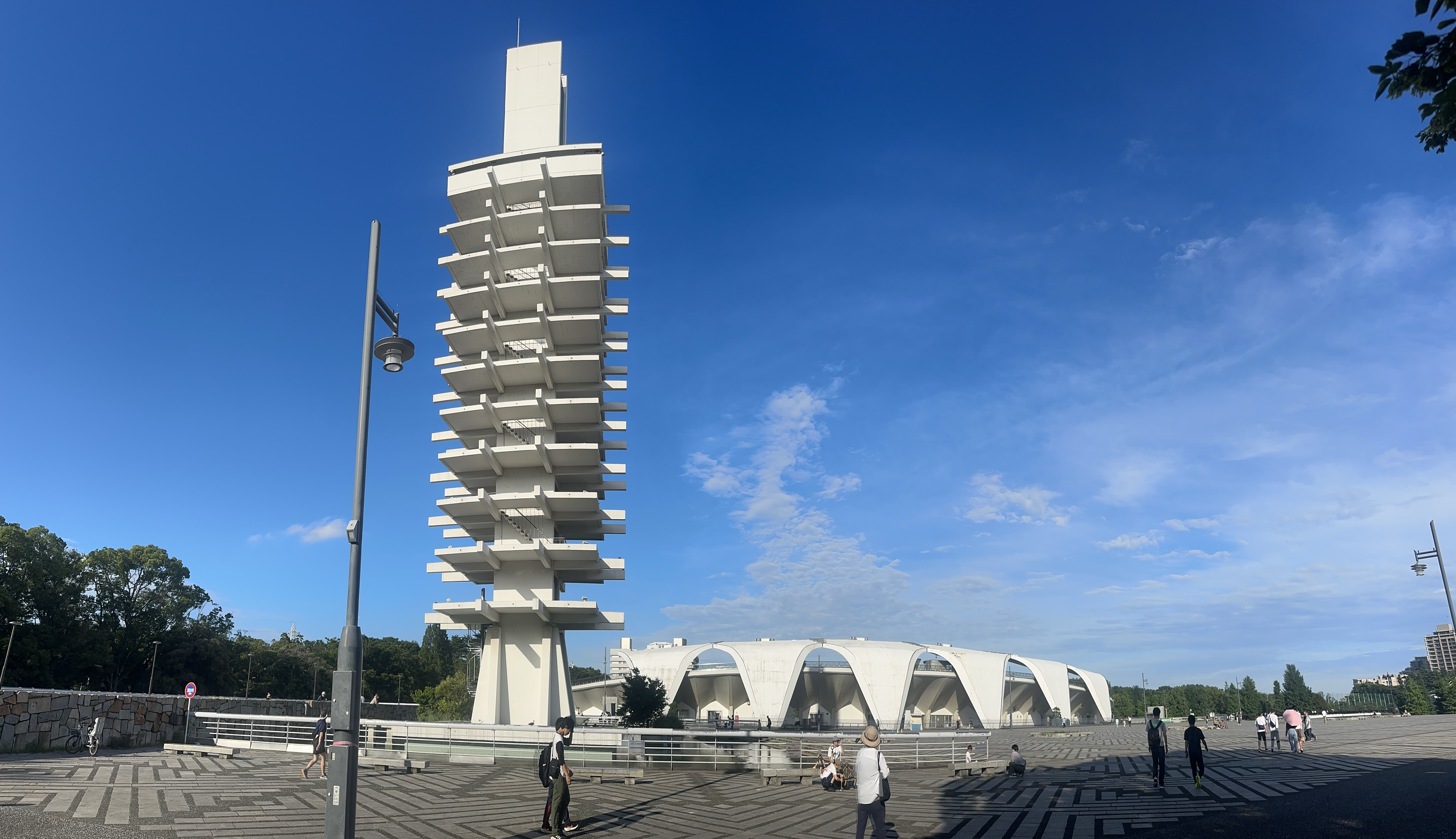
- Komazawa Olympic Park Stadium with Control Tower and Central Plaza
- Interactive map of Komazawa Olympic Park Stadium
- Location: Setagaya, Tokyo
- Owner: Tokyo City
- Operator: Tokyo Sports Culture Foundation
- Capacity: 20,010
- Surface: Grass

Construction
- Groundbreaking: September 1962
- Opened: May 1964
- Architect: Murata Masachika Architects
- Builder: Todagumi

Tenant
- Black Rams Tokyo

Komazawa Olympic Park Stadium (駒沢オリンピック公園総合運動場陸上競技場) is a multi-purpose stadium in Setagaya, Tokyo, Japan. The stadium is an integral feature of Komazawa Olympic Park and is currently used mostly for football matches (although mostly amateur and women's matches) and rugby union games. The stadium has a capacity of 20,010.

The stadium hosted some of the football preliminaries for the 1964 Summer Olympics. Some J. League Division 1, J. League Division 2, J. League Cup, and Emperor's Cup matches, (including the Finals on 1965 and 1966), had also been played at the stadium.

== Access ==
12 minutes walk from Komazawa-daigaku Station (Tōkyū Den-en-toshi Line)
