= Yukiya Saito =

Japanese baseball player (born 1995)

Yukiya Saitoh
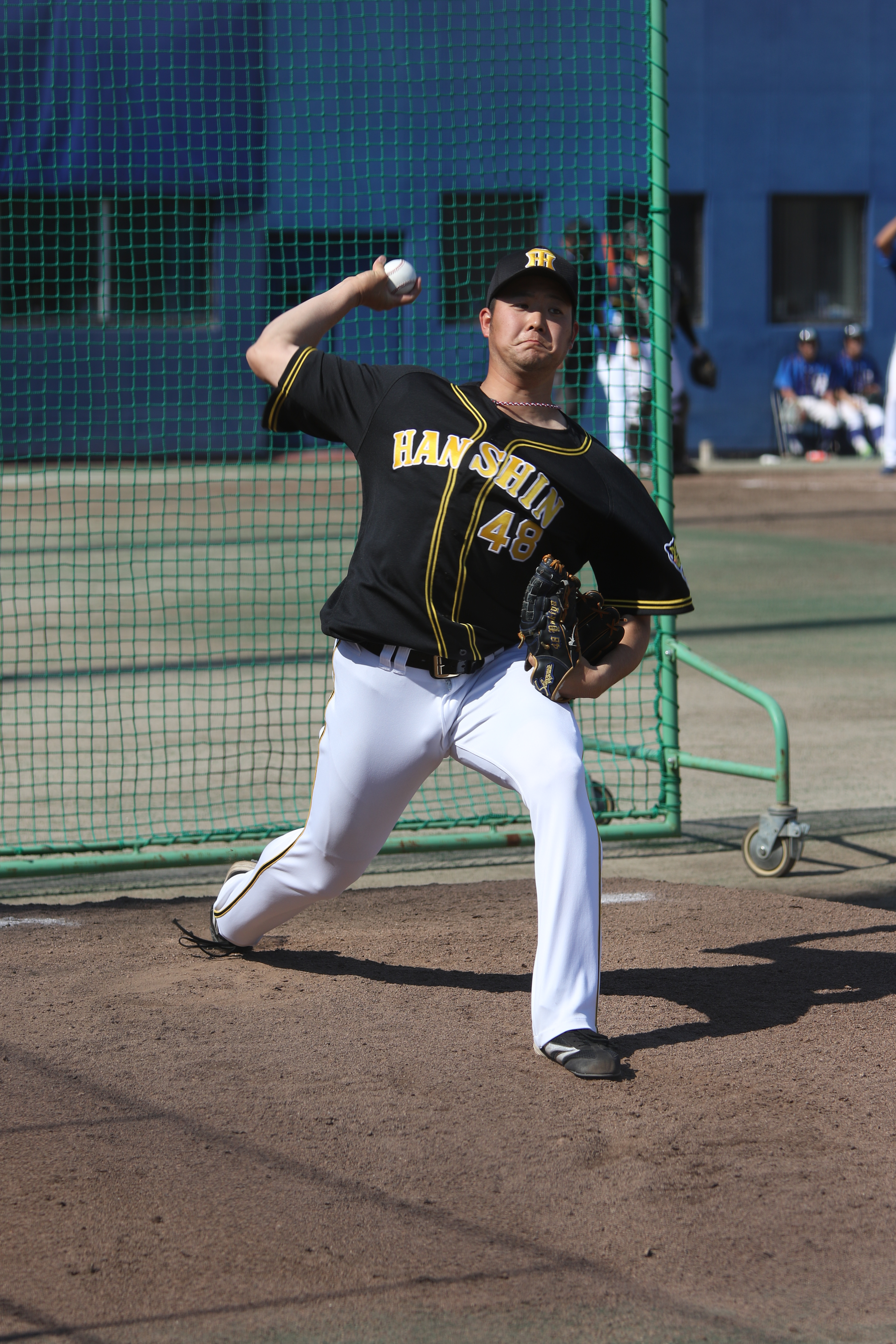

Hokkaido Nippon-Ham Fighters – No. 48
- Pitcher
- Born: January 5, 1995 (age 31); Higashine, Yamagata, Japan
- Bats: Left Throws: Right

NPB debut
- April 19, 2019, for the Hanshin Tigers

Career statistics (through 2024 season)
- Win-loss record: 2-3
- Earned run average: 3.95
- Strikeouts: 91
- Saves: 1
- Holds: 6
- Stats at Baseball Reference

Teams
- Hanshin Tigers (2019-2022); Hokkaido Nippon-Ham Fighters (2023-present)

Yukiya Saitoh (齋藤 友貴哉, Saitoh Yukiya; born January 5, 1995 in Higashine, Yamagata, Japan) is a professional Japanese baseball pitcher for the Hokkaido Nippon-Ham Fighters of Nippon Professional Baseball (NPB). He has previously played in NPB for the Hanshin Tigers.

== Career ==
On October 18, 2022, during the off-season, Saitoh was traded to the Hokkaido Nippon-Ham Fighters in a two-for-two trade alongside Taiga Egoshi, with Ryo Watanabe, and Yuto Takahama heading to Hanshin in return.
