= Ryo Watanabe (infielder) =

Japanese baseball player (born 1995)

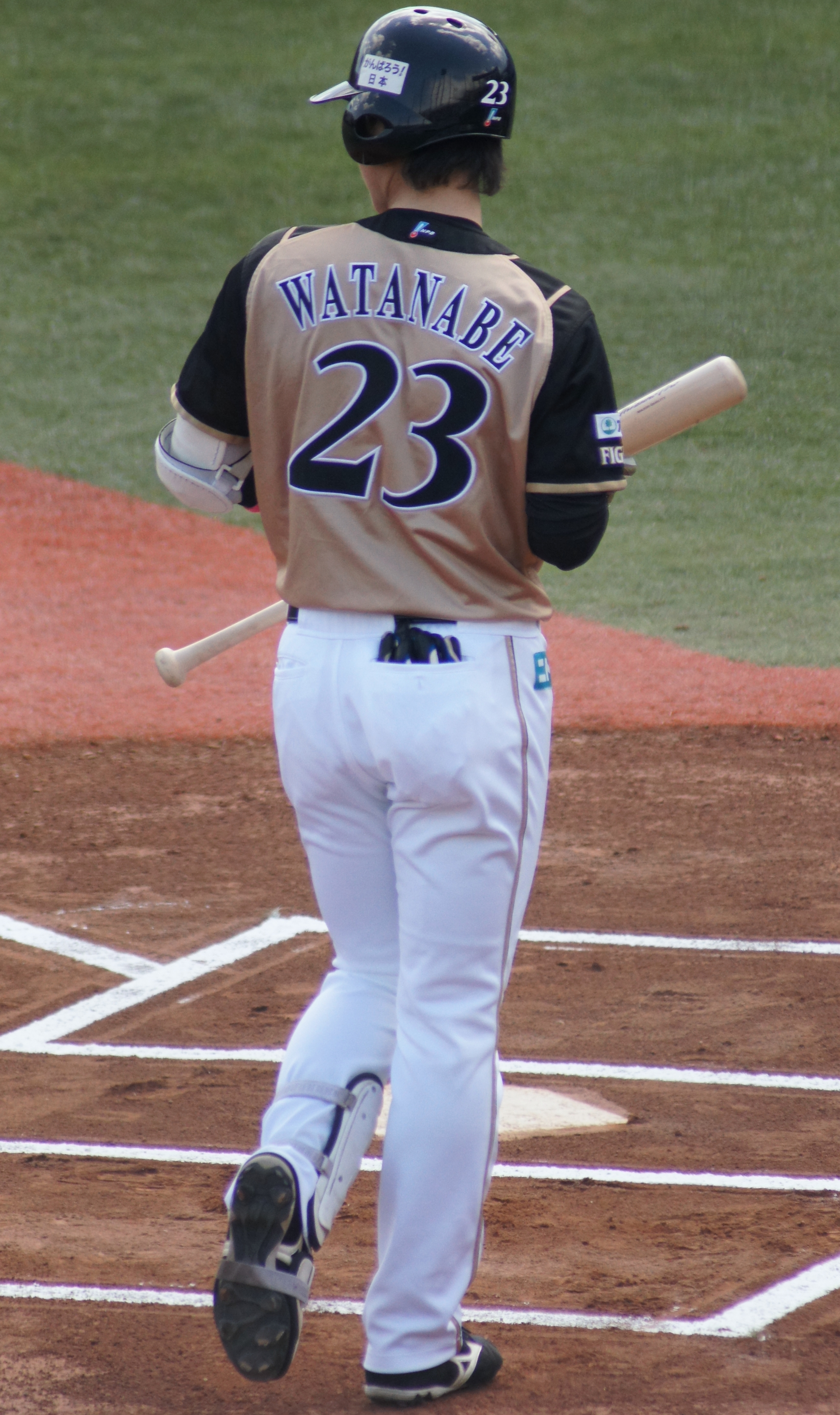

Oisix Niigata Albirex – No. 23
- Infielder
- Born: April 30, 1995 (age 30); Tsuchiura, Ibaraki, Japan
- Bats: Right Throws: Right

NPB debut
- September 30, 2014, for the Hokkaido Nippon-Ham Fighters

NPB statistics (through 2025 season)
- Batting average: .252
- Home runs: 32
- Hits: 421
- RBI: 167
- Stolen bases: 10
- Stats at Baseball Reference

Teams
- Hokkaido Nippon-Ham Fighters (2014–2022); Hanshin Tigers (2023-2025); Oisix Niigata Albirex (2026-present)

Career highlights and awards
- 1× Japan Series Champion (2023)
Medals
Men's baseball
Representing Japan
18U Baseball World Cup
Silver medal – second place	2013 Taichung	Team

Ryo Watanabe (渡邉 諒, Watanabe Ryō; born April 30, 1995) is a Japanese professional baseball infielder for the Hanshin Tigers of Nippon Professional Baseball (NPB). He has previously played in MLB for the Hokkaido Nippon-Ham Fighters.

== Career ==
On October 18, 2022, during the off-season, Watanabe was traded to the Hanshin Tigers in a two-for-two trade alongside Yuto Takahama, with Yukiya Saitoh, and Taiga Egoshi heading to Hokkaido in return.
