= Taiga Egoshi =

Japanese baseball player (born 1993)

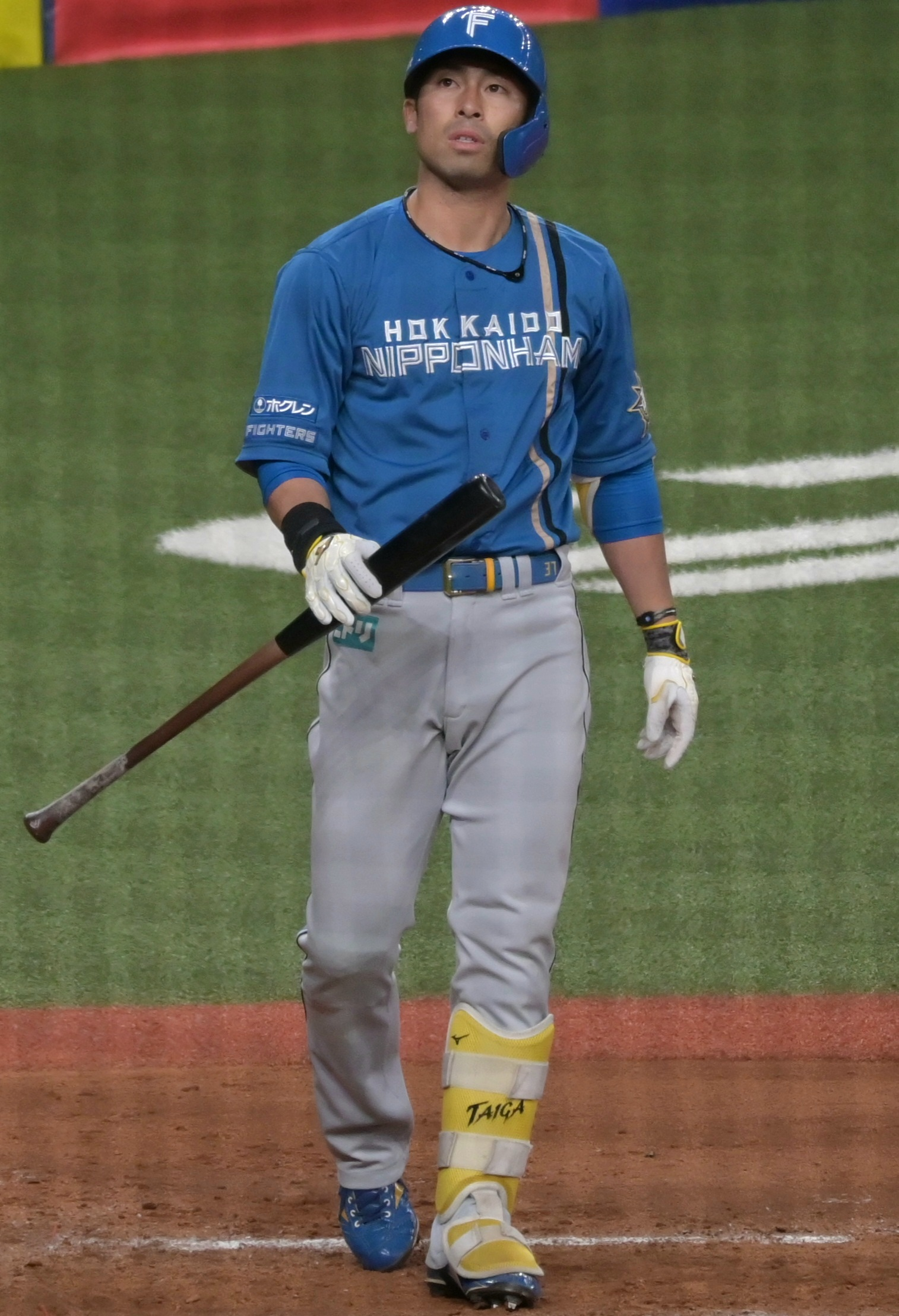
- Egoshi on April 8, 2023
- Outfielder
- Born: March 12, 1993 (age 33); Minamishimabara, Nagasaki, Japan
- Batted: Right Threw: Right

NPB debut
- April 2, 2015, for the Hanshin Tigers

Last NPB appearance
- October 18, 2024, for the Hokkaido Nippon-Ham Fighters

NPB statistics
- Batting average: .187
- Hits: 111
- Home runs: 18
- Runs batted in: 51
- Stolen bases: 32
- Stats at Baseball Reference

Teams
- Hanshin Tigers (2015–2022); Hokkaido Nippon-Ham Fighters (2023–2024)

Taiga Egoshi (江越 大賀, Egoshi Taiga; born March 12, 1993 in Minamishimabara, Nagasaki) is a Japanese professional baseball outfielder for the Hokkaido Nippon-Ham Fighters of Nippon Professional Baseball. He has previously played in NPB for the Hanshin Tigers.

== Early Baseball Career ==
A native of Nagasaki, Taiga started playing softball in 2nd grade all the way to junior high school. He joined Kaisei High School's baseball club but his team never made it to Koshien.

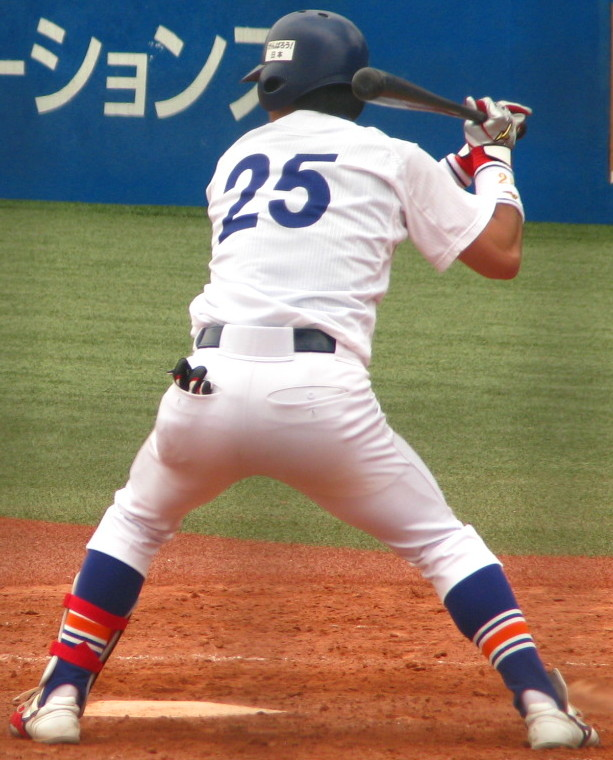
Egoshi in Komazawa University in 2014

Upon entering Komazawa University, he participated in the Tohto University League games as an outfielder, and won the League Best Nine Award thrice. Together with later Tigers teammate Ryutaro Umeno, they played in the 2013 Japan-USA University Baseball Championship, where Japan won the 5-game series 3-2. In the autumn of his senior year, he batted 0.357 and led his team to its first league championship since 2001. He recorded a total of 11 home runs in his university career.

== Professional career ==
=== Hanshin Tigers ===
Draft

He was the Hanshin Tigers' 3rd pick in the 2014 Nippon Professional Baseball draft. On November 26, he signed a contract for an annual salary of 10 million yen, plus a signing bonus of 60 million. He was assigned the jersey number 25, formerly owned by his Komazawa University senior, Takahiro Arai (played for the Hanshin Tigers until 2014 season).

2015

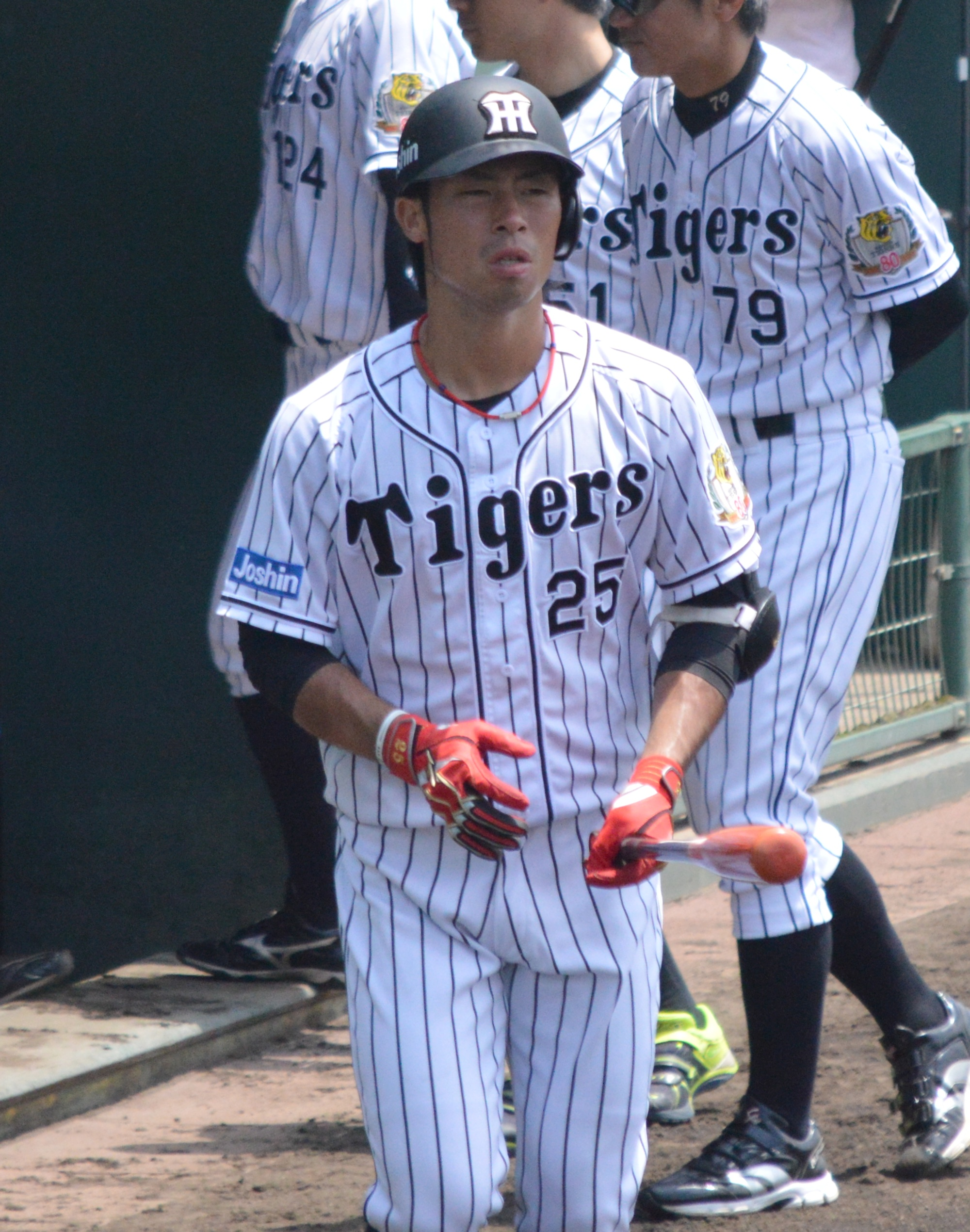
Egoshi with the Hanshin Tigers in 2015

During the February spring camp in Okinawa, he showed early promise by hitting relatively well during batting practice sessions and intra-squad games. He even went 4-for-5 during a practice game against Samsung Lions in the KBO League. He continued his productive streak, and eventually made it to the starting roster for the pre-season exhibition games. On March 4, he hit a 2-run homerun from Softbank Hawks' Kenji Otonari, and became the first Hanshin rookie to hit a home run in an exhibition game since Takashi Toritani in 2004. Fellow rookie Tsuyoshi Ishizaki also recorded the win that day, making them the first Hanshin rookies to record a victory and homerun in an exhibition game since Masashi Fujiwara and Akinobu Okada in 1980. He batted .267 in all of his exhibition game appearances, and earned himself a spot in the main squad's opening day roster. He decided to skip his university graduation ceremonies in order to attend the season opener, and witnessed the Tigers notch their first victory for the season, and first opening day walk-off win in 74 years.

He first appeared as a pinch hitter on the 7th inning of the April 2 match against the Tokyo Yakult Swallows, where he got hit by a wild pitch by Tetsuya Yamamoto. He made it to the starting line up 3 days later, but still failed to record a hit. His first hit came from Yokohama DeNA Baystars' Shoichi Ino on April 8, but he again went hitless on his next start which prompted management to take him off the active roster on April 13. Despite the demotion, he got his rhythm back in the farm games and was once again called up to the main squad on the 23rd. On his next start, he cracked a 3-run home run off Swallows' Yoshihisa Naruse on his first at-bat. The home run - his first official one, helped Hanshin take two straight wins during an early season slump.

On July 24, he homered in his second straight game and became the first rookie in franchise history to accomplish the feat since Akinobu Okada in 1980. Two days later, he notched his first career modasho(3 hits in a game) against Yokohama and became the first rookie to accomplish the feat since Shunsuke Fujikawa in 2010.

2016

He hit the first home run of the season as a pinch hitter in the match against Yokohama DeNA Baystars on April 3 (Yokohama Stadium), and hit the second home run as a pinch hitter in the next match against the Yomiuri Giants (Tokyo Dome) on April 7. On the next day, in the match against Hiroshima Toyo Carp (Hanshin Koshien Stadium), when he was appointed as batting second, center fielder, he hit a solo home run in the first at-bat in the bottom of the 1st inning and achieved 3 consecutive home runs over 3 games. Furthermore, on April 9, the next day, when he was appointed as batting second, he hit a solo home run in the first at-bat from Hiroki Kuroda, and he has achieved 4 consecutive home runs since Craig Brazell in 2009 in Hanshin Tigers, and as a Japanese player in Tigers, since Tomoaki Kanemoto in 2005. However, from the end of April, his condition deteriorated, and he experienced no hits in 21 consecutive at-bats. After the beginning of May, he made a round trip between the main squad and the farm. He played 72 main squad games in total and recorded 7 home runs with a batting average of .209.

2017

Following the previous year, he went back and forth between the main squad and the farm. He played in 28 main squad games, but he failed to hit a home run for the first time since he became a professional, and his batting average remained at .077. In the Climax Series First Stage (Koshien) against Yokohama DeNA Baystars, he participated in all three games as a pinch hitter and pinch runner. After the season, he worked on left-handed practice with a view to switching to a switch hitter.

2018

Before the season, he changed his registration from R/R to R/D, but gave up switch hitter around mid-March. He decided to focus on right-handed hitting again. He spent most of the season in the farm, and in the main squad official match, he hit a home run for the first time in two years in the match against Hiroshima Toyo Carp on May 12 (MAZDA Zoom-Zoom Stadium Hiroshima), but the batting average is sluggish with .150 in 29 games. Continuing from the previous year, he often participated in the middle of the game, and the home run was only this one. In the official game of the Western League, he participated in 88 games mainly as the first batter from the opening. With a batting average of .212, he recorded 15 home runs and 51 runs, second in the league, and 25 stolen bases, third in the league, and he contributed to the Western league champion for the first time in eight years and the farm champion for the first time in 12 years.

2019

He participated in 49 games mainly as a pinch runner and defense.

2020

He was sent to the farm because of the close contact with COVID-19. When he returned to practice in the Western League on October 9, he changed his batting form to hold the bat short, achieved a batting average of .338 in the Western League, and was promoted to the main squad again on November 3.

He participated in 45 main squad games, but he mainly appeared as a pinch runner, and the number of at bats remained at 13 at-bats, with 0 hits.

2021

He was mainly used as a pinch runner and defense, and although he participated in 31 games, he only had three at-bats, and he had no hits two years in a row.On December 3, he renewed his contract and signed with an estimated annual salary of 11 million yen, which was 2 million yen down.

2022

He participated in 24 main squad games, mainly as a pinch runner and defense.

=== Hokkaido Nippon-Ham Fighters ===
On October 18, 2022, during the off-season, he was traded to the Hokkaido Nippon-Ham Fighters in a two-for-two trade alongside Yukiya Saitoh, with Ryo Watanabe, and Yuto Takahama heading to Hanshin in return. He was assigned the jersey number 37.

== Playing Style ==
During his university years, Egoshi was known for his slugging power and speed (5.8 seconds for a 50-meter dash). His throwing arm can also be relied upon for defense in the outfield. Eventually, he became known as the triple three right-handed slugger (batting average above .300, hit 30 homers since high school, and stole 30 bases).

== Detailed information ==
=== Batting record by year ===
Year	Team	G	T P A	A B	R	H	2 B	3 B	H R	T B	R B I	S B	C S	S H	S F	B B	I B B	H B P	S O	G I D P	A V G	O B P	S L G	O P S
2015	Hanshin	56	176	168	21	36	8	3	5	65	16	2	0	0	0	6	0	2	64	0	.214	.250	.387	.637
2016	Hanshin	72	217	191	33	40	6	1	7	69	20	4	3	2	3	18	0	3	78	2	.209	.284	.361	.645
2017	Hanshin	28	18	13	3	1	0	0	0	1	0	1	0	0	0	3	0	2	5	0	.077	.333	.077	.410
2018	Hanshin	29	40	40	6	6	2	0	1	11	1	3	0	0	0	0	0	0	22	0	.150	.150	.275	.425
2019	Hanshin	49	16	15	8	1	0	0	0	1	0	1	0	0	0	1	0	0	9	0	.067	.125	.067	.192
2020	Hanshin	45	13	10	11	0	0	0	0	0	1	3	1	0	1	2	0	0	6	0	.000	.154	.000	.154
2021	Hanshin	31	3	3	4	0	0	0	0	0	0	5	1	0	0	0	0	0	1	0	.000	.000	.000	.000
2022	Hanshin	24	5	4	4	0	0	0	0	0	0	4	0	0	0	1	0	0	3	0	.000	.200	.000	.200
Total		334	488	444	90	84	16	4	13	147	38	23	5	2	4	31	0	7	188	2	.189	.251	.331	.582

=== Defensive record by year ===
Year	Team	Outfielder					
Year	Team	G	P O	A	E	D P	F P C T
2015	Hanshin	51	98	1	3	0	.971
2016	Hanshin	60	97	0	2	0	.980
2017	Hanshin	14	3	0	0	0	1.000
2018	Hanshin	24	29	0	0	0	1.000
2019	Hanshin	41	17	0	0	0	1.000
2020	Hanshin	39	17	0	0	0	1.000
2021	Hanshin	28	7	0	1	0	.875
2022	Hanshin	18	8	1	1	0	.900
Total		275	276	2	7	0	.975
