= Shota Kikuchi =

Japanese footballer

Personal information
- Date of birth: 14 May 1993 (age 33)
- Place of birth: Saitama, Japan
- Height: 1.77 m (5 ft 10 in)
- Position: Forward

Team information
- Current team: Tokyo United FC
- Number: 13

Youth career
- 2012–2015: Komazawa University

Senior career*
Years	Team	Apps	(Gls)
2016–2018	Iwaki FC	20	(30)
2019	Iwate Grulla Morioka	23	(1)
2020–	Tokyo United FC	3	(0)
- * Club domestic league appearances and goals as of 17:04, 10 November 2020 (UTC)

Shota Kikuchi (菊池 将太, Kikuchi Shota; born 14 May 1993) is a Japanese footballer currently playing as a forward for Tokyo United.

== Career statistics ==
=== Club ===
As of 10 November 2020.

Club	Season	League			Cup		League Cup		Total	
Club	Season	Division	Apps	Goals	Apps	Goals	Apps	Goals	Apps	Goals
Iwaki FC	2016	Fukushima Prefectural; Football League	2	4	0	0	–		2	4
Iwaki FC	2017	Fukushima Prefectural; Football League	3	4	2 (Note: Appearances in the Emperor's Cup)	1	–		5	5
Iwaki FC	2018	Fukushima Prefectural; Football League	15	22	1	0	–		16	22
Iwaki FC	Total		20	30	3	1	0	0	23	34
Iwate Grulla Morioka	2019	J3 League	23	1	2	0	0	0	25	1
Tokyo United FC	2020	Kantō Soccer League	3	0	0	0	–		3	0
Career total			46	31	5	1	0	0	51	32
