= Ryota Arai =

Japanese baseball player (born 1983)

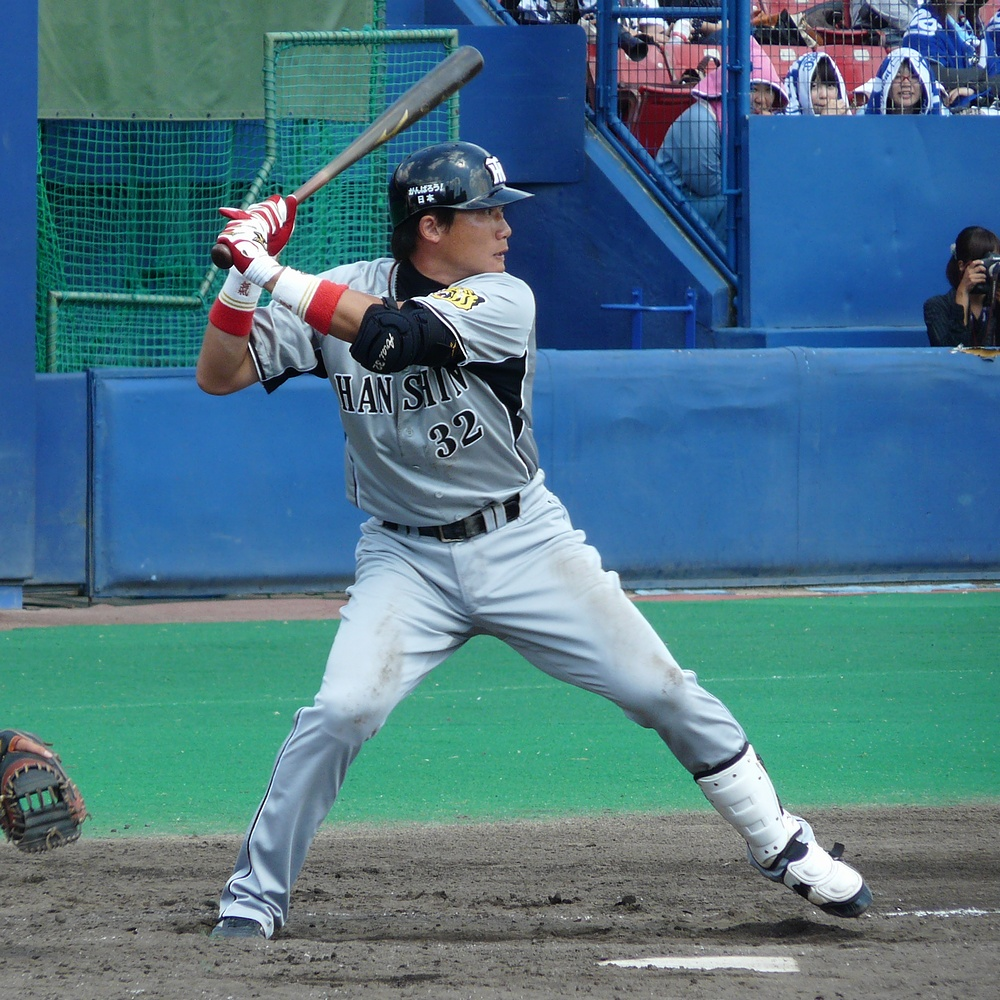
- Arai with the Hanshin Tigers

Hiroshima Toyo Carp – No. 84
- Infielder / Coach
- Born: Park Yang-tae (박양태); August 16, 1983 (age 42); Hiroshima, Japan
- Batted: Right Threw: Right

NPB debut
- July 25, 2006, for the Chunichi Dragons

Last NPB appearance
- October 10, 2017, for the Hanshin Tigers

NPB statistics
- Batting average: .238
- Home runs: 40
- Run batted in: 151
- Stats at Baseball Reference

Teams
- As player: Chunichi Dragons (2006–2010); Hanshin Tigers (2011–2017); As coach: Hanshin Tigers (2018–2022); Hiroshima Toyo Carp (2023–present)

Ryota Arai (新井 良太, Arai Ryota; born August 16, 1983 in Hiroshima) is a Japanese former professional baseball infielder and the second-string hitting coach for the Hiroshima Toyo Carp of Nippon Professional Baseball (NPB). He played in NPB for the Chunichi Dragons from 2006 to 2010, and with the Hanshin Tigers from 2011 to 2017.

His elder brother Takahiro is also a former professional baseball player.

== Early baseball career ==
He played softball from his 5th year in grade school, and continued when he attended the Satsukigaoka Junior High School in Hiroshima. In his 2nd year, his school team placed 3rd in the junior high softball tournament in China.

He then attended Koryo High School where he played as first baseman. In the spring of his senior year, he was elected as team captain (4th batter) and participated in the finals of the Japanese High School Baseball Invitational Tournament. In their battle with East Fukuoka High School, 2nd year Yuki Yoshimura pitched 3 scoreless innings, but ended up losing the game (4-8) in favor of Koryo. Kentaro Nishimura and Shirahama Yuta, both one year his junior, played alongside him.

He then entered Komazawa University where his team participated in the Tohto University Baseball League. Out of 79 games played in college, he recorded a .238 batting average, 63 hits, 49 RBIs and 14 home runs, and received the Best Nine Award twice.

== Chunichi Dragons ==
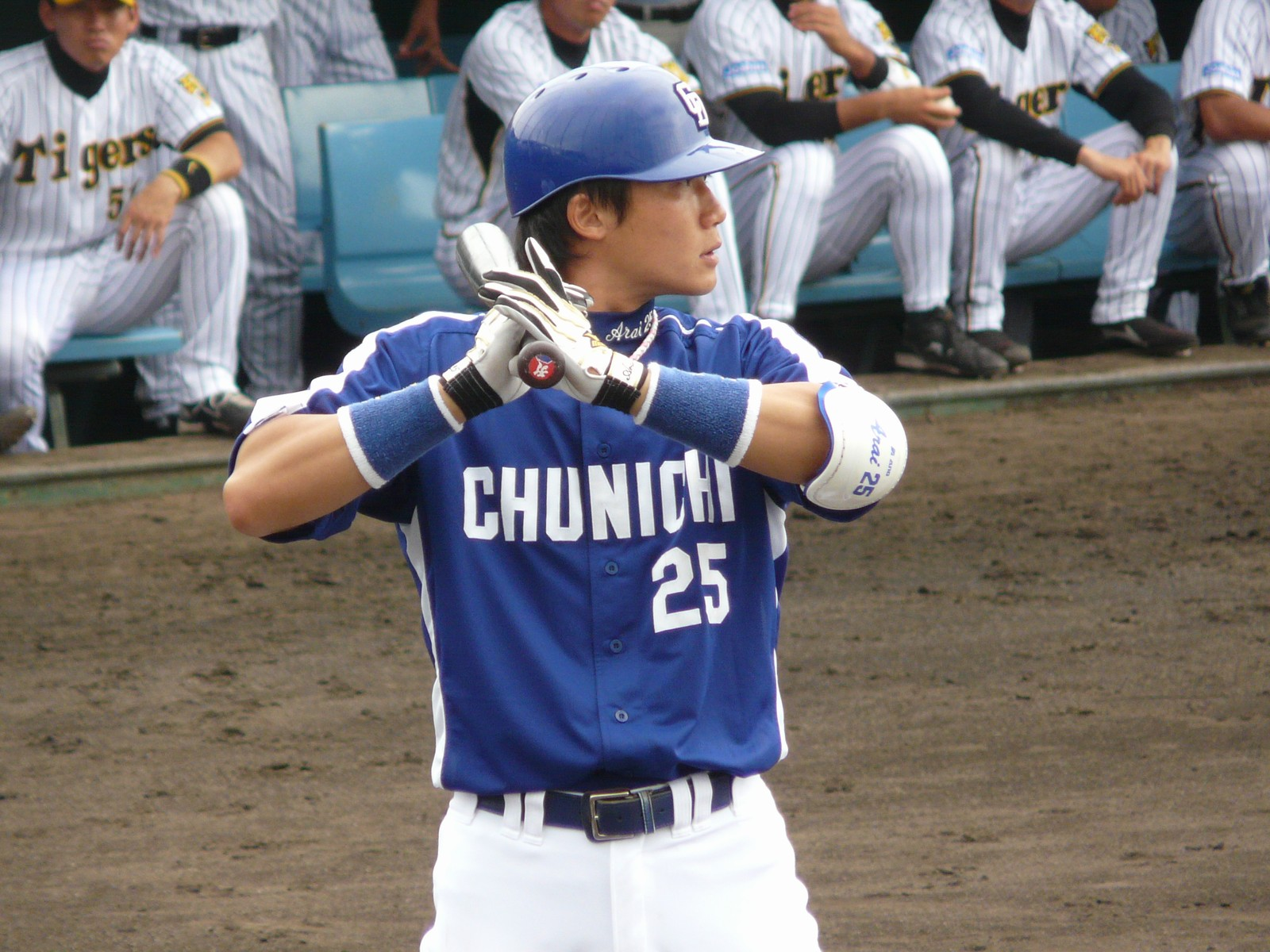
Nov. 6, 2008, Dragons vs Tigers

He was drafted by the Chunichi Dragons during the off-season of 2005, and played for them from 2006 to 2010. He was given the jersey no. 25, same as his older brother.

== Hanshin Tigers ==
2011

In the April 19 opening match with the Yomiuri Giants right after his transfer to the Hanshin Tigers, Ryota hit his first professional walk-off hit. Three days later, his brother also hit a walk-off run against the Yokohama DeNA BayStars, making them the first-ever siblings from the same team to hit walk-off runs in the same season。 But on August 5, due to his recent performances not being up to par, he was demoted to the second squad. In that month, out of 32 at-bats, he only delivered 4 hits and a batting average of .125. In September, he recovered and returned to the first squad, but again fell into a slump later. He finished the season with a batting average below .200, and appeared only in 43 games, even less than that of his previous year.

2012

He played various positions during the 2012 season, from first and 3rd baseman, to left and right outfielder. His game appearances also gradually increased. On the July 17 match with the Giants, he hit the team's 7,000th home run. On the 29th of the same month, the Arai brothers both appeared in the starting line-up in the game vs. Yokohama, and to astonishment of everyone in their home court, both players hit groundbreaking home runs. This feat was last accomplished 31 years ago (1981), when brothers Leron Lee and Leon Lee scored homers in the same game for the former Lotte Orions (currently Chiba Lotte Marines).

On August, Hanshin manager Yutaka Wada appointed him as 3rd baseman and had him fixed as 4th batter in the line-up. During the 3rd inning of the August 12 game vs. the Carps, he hit his first home run as a clean-up hitter. In the 6th inning of the same game, Takahiro again hit another home run, making it their 2nd same-game home run for the season. In addition, he again hit a 2-run walk-off homer in Koshien during the 11th inning of the September 2 match against Hiroshima.

Total games played for the season was a personal-high of 110 games. He batted .280 and drove in 32 runs, including 11 home runs.

2013

Assigned as the 4th batter in the starting line-up, he delivered the 1st RBI of the season with his 2-base grounder during the March 29 season opening game with the Swallows. He continued as a clean-up hitter until he strained his left thigh on April 5, when he ran through 1st after hitting a grounder to short that turned into a double-play. He returned to the 1st squad as the third baseman and 6th hitter after a 10-day rest. He hit his first career grandslam on the May 19 game with the Hawks. Afterwards, he hit a slump and was demoted to being the 7th/8th batter, and the clean-up position was assigned to Matt Murton. Because of his lackluster performance as 3rd baseman, he was eventually demoted to playing in the 2nd squad during the latter part of the season interleague. When he returned on July 15, he hit his season's second grand slam against the BayStars in front of the home crowd at Koshien. He again hit another a week after in the game against the Swallows. He is the 4th Tiger player to hit 3 grand slams in a single season, after Hal Breeden, Kōichi Tabuchi and Makoto Imaoka.

Out of 119 game appearances, he recorded a career-best 14 home runs and 51 RBIs, but a lower batting average of .238.

2014

He started the season in excellent form, batting .338 and hitting 6 over the fence on his first month alone. But his performance dwindled in the month of May, and he was eventually demoted to the 2nd squad on June 25. He was able to make it back to the upper roster, but he only appeared as a pinch hitter or the occasional right fielder (7th batter), replacing Kosuke Fukudome who also fell into a slump. He started feeling lower back pain by the end of August, and was again taken off the roster for rehabilitation until the season ended, but he was able to play as pinch hitter and right fielder during the off-season play-offs.

He only appeared in 78 games, but he nevertheless contributed 34 RBIs, including 7 home runs.

== Personal life ==
Ryota is of Korean-Japanese descent, but became a naturalized Japanese citizen along with his brother in June 2004. It is often told that his playing form and physique closely resembles that of his brother. According to an article in Chunichi News, when Ryota first appeared as a pinch hitter in a game vs Hanshin on July 25, 2006, at the time he was struck out, then left fielder Tomoaki Kanemoto said "You look too much like your brother!". Up to this day, both brothers still hold deep respect for Kanemoto.

He is also a calligraphy specialist.
