= Taisen Deshimaru =

Japanese Sōtō Zen Buddhist (1914–1982)

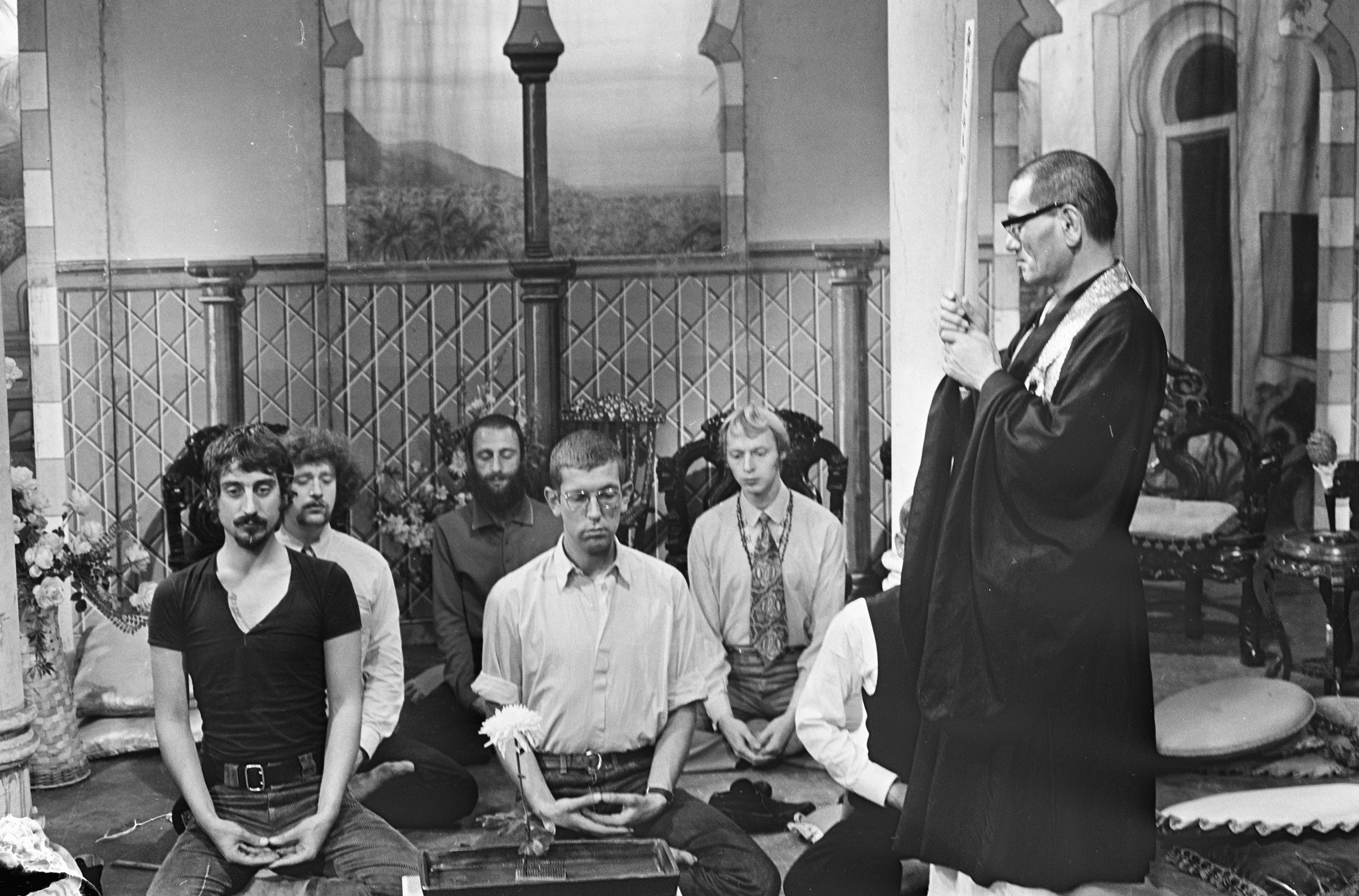
- Taisen Deshimaru in the Netherlands (1967)
- Title: Rōshi

Personal life
- Born: 1914 Saga Prefecture, Japan
- Died: April 30, 1982 (aged 67–68)

Religious life
- Religion: Buddhism
- School: Sōtō

Senior posting
- Teacher: Kodo Sawaki
- Predecessor: Yamada Reirin
- Website: Association Zen Internationale

Taisen Deshimaru (弟子丸 泰仙, Deshimaru Taisen; 29 November 1914 - April 30, 1982) was a Japanese Sōtō Zen Buddhist teacher, who founded the Association Zen Internationale.

== Biography ==
=== Early life ===
Born in the Saga Prefecture of Kyūshū, Deshimaru was raised by his grandfather, a former Samurai before the Meiji Revolution, and by his mother, a devout follower of the Jōdo Shinshū sect of Buddhism. Interested in the world, he abandoned his mother's practices and studied Christianity for a long while under a Protestant minister before ultimately deciding that it was not for him either. He returned to Buddhism and eventually came into contact with Rinzai teachings.

Eventually, he also grew distant from Rinzai Buddhism and was unsatisfied by his life as a businessman. In 1935, when he was studying economics in Tokyo, Deshimaru began to practice under Sōtō Zen Master Kodo Sawaki.

Following the Attack on Pearl Harbor, his master predicted that Japan would lose the war. When Deshimaru departed from his Master, Kodo said "Our homeland will be destroyed, our people annihilated . . . and this may be the last time we see one another. Nevertheless, love all mankind regardless of race or creed."

=== War years ===
Deshimaru was exempted from the Imperial Japanese Army because of his near-sightedness. He went to the island of Bangka, Indonesia, to direct a copper mine. There he taught the practice of zazen to the Chinese, Indonesian, and European inhabitants. He defended inhabitants against the violence of his own people, and was therefore almost thrown in jail, in which case he would have been released by "the highest military authorities in Japan".

Thereafter Deshimaru went to the island of Belitung, to direct a copper mine which was captured from the Dutch. After the war he was taken prisoner by the Americans, and sent to a camp in Singapore.

=== Further Zen studies ===
Deshimaru quickly rejoined Kodo Sawaki. He studied with him for fourteen years, until Sawaki's death in 1965. Deshimaru received ordination as a monk shortly before Sawaki became ill. Deshimaru claimed to have received dharma transmission at Sawaki's deathbed, but it was never registered with the Soto school. Sawaki is said to have expressed his wish to spread Zen to other parts of the world on his deathbed, and asked Deshimaru to travel to Europe and spread the teaching.

=== Europe ===
In 1967, Deshimaru went to Europe and settled in Paris in order to fulfill his master's wish and spread the teachings of Zen. In an interview Deshimaru affirmed he chose France to teach because of its philosophical tradition; he cited Michel de Montaigne, René Descartes, Henri Bergson and Nicolas Malebranche as philosophers who understood Zen without even knowing it. In the 1970s, his mission grew. In 1970 Deshimaru received dharma transmission from Master Yamada Reirin. He became Kaikyosokan (head of Japanese Soto Zen for a particular country or continent) in Europe.

He died in 1982, after he had solidly established Zen practice in the West. After Master Deshimaru's death, three of his closest disciples, Etienne Zeisler, Roland Rech, and Kosen Thibaut, traveled to Japan to receive the shiho from the highest Soto authority, Master Rempo Niwa Zenji. In 1977 Master Deshimaru ordained Olivier Wang-Genh into his Soto-lineage. In 2016 Olivier Wang-Genh was re-appointed President of the Buddhist Union of France.

== Influence ==
Deshimaru founded the Association Zen Internationale in 1970, and La Gendronnière in 1979. Deshimaru trained many disciples, and was the catalyst for the creation of a multitude of practice centers. His teachings and multitude of books helped spread the influence of Zen in Europe and America, particularly of the Sōtō sect. In his later years he stimulated the thoughts of Zhong Fushi who wrote several letters to him discussing Zen as part of the flux.

== Students ==
- Reiryu Philippe Coupey, dharma transmission from Kojun Kishigami, who received dharma transmission from Kodo Sawaki.
- Kosen Thibaut, dharma transmission from Niwa Zenji in 1984.
- Robert Livingston
- Master Sando Kaisen

== Books ==
- Za-Zen, the practice of the Zen
- Sit: Zen Teachings of Master Taisen Deshimaru
- The Ring of the Way: Testament of a Zen Master
- Questions to a Zen Master
- The Zen Way To Martial Arts
- The Way of True Zen
- The Voice of the Valley
- Mushotoku Mind: The Heart of the Heart Sutra

== See also ==
- Buddhism in France
- Zazen
