= Reirin Yamada =

- Title: Zenji, D.Litt.

Personal life
- Born: 1889 Takayama, Gifu, Japan
- Died: 1979 (aged 89–90)

Religious life
- Religion: Zen Buddhism
- School: Sōtō

Senior posting
- Based in: Eiheiji; Komazawa University
- Successor: Taisen Deshimaru

Dr. Reirin Yamada (山田 霊林, Yamada Reirin; 1889–1979) was a Sōtō Zen master who held many positions in his lifetime, including 75th Abbot of Eiheiji in Japan, Abbot of Zenshuji in Los Angeles, California, and President of Komazawa University.

He was also a strong supporter of the Japanese Imperial Army.
