= Komazawa-daigaku Station =

Railway station in Tokyo, Japan

Coordinates: 35.633394°N 139.661846°E

Komazawa-daigaku Station 駒沢大学駅

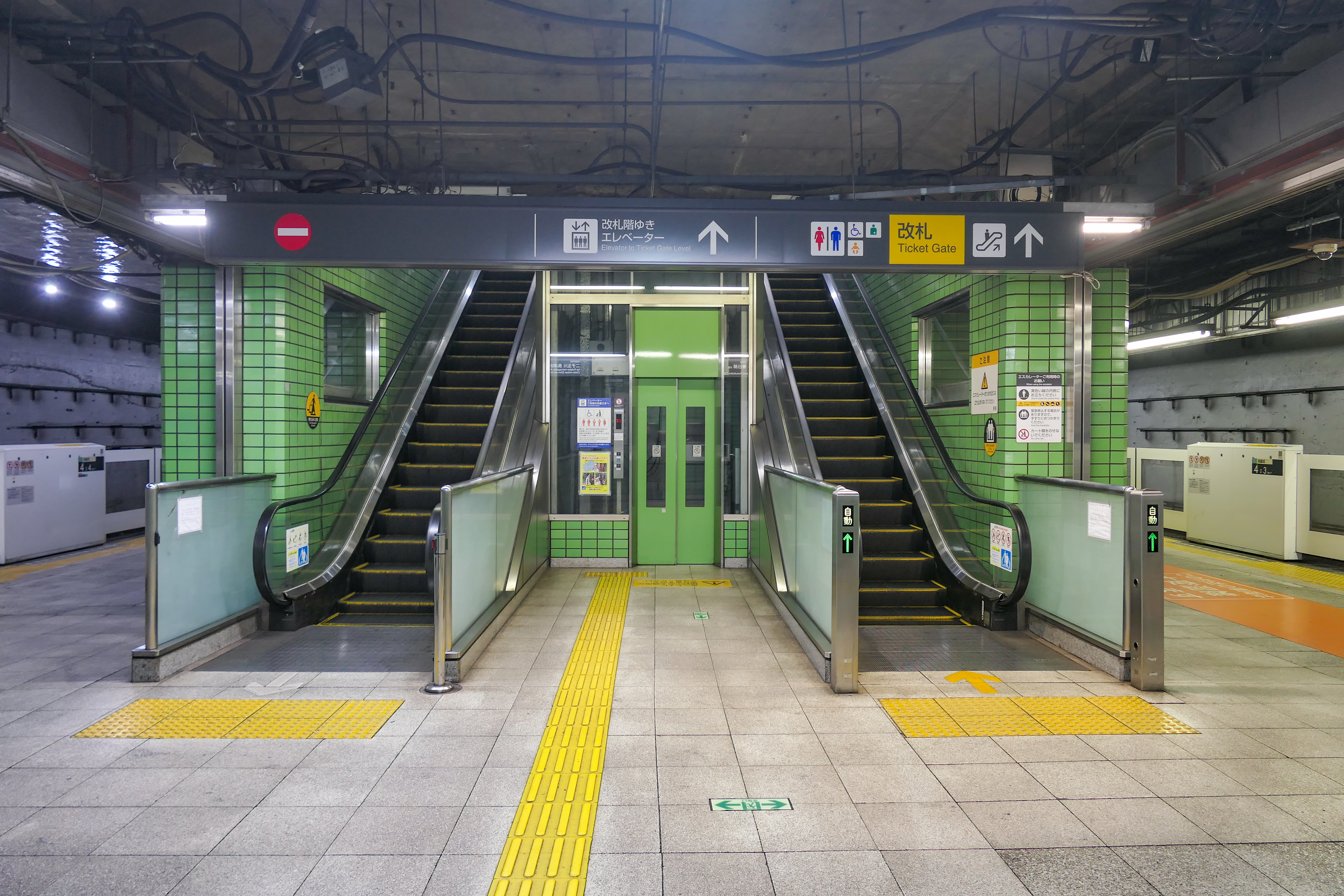
- Platforms, 26 March 2023

General information
- Location: 4-3 Kamiuma, Setagaya, Tokyo （東京都世田谷区上馬4-3） Japan
- Operator: Tōkyū Railways
- Line: Den-en-toshi Line
- Platforms: 1 island platform
- Tracks: 2
- Connections: Bus stop

Construction
- Structure type: Underground

Other information
- Station code: DT04

History
- Opened: 7 April 1977; 49 years ago

Services
Preceding station	Tōkyū Railways	Following station
Sakura-shimmachi towards Chūō-rinkan	Den-en-toshi Line Semi-Express Local	Sangen-jaya towards Shibuya
Location
- Location within Special wards of Tokyo Location within Tokyo Bay and Bōsō Peninsula Location within Tokyo Location within Japan

Komazawa-daigaku Station (駒沢大学駅, Komazawa-daigaku-eki) is a railway station on the Tokyu Den-en-toshi Line in the eastern part of Setagaya, Tokyo, Japan. It is operated by the private railway operator Tokyu Corporation. The station is named after Komazawa University, which is close-by.

== Lines ==
Komazawa-daigaku Station is served by the Tokyu Den-en-toshi Line from Shibuya Station in Tokyo. It is numbered "DT04".

The station's color is "young leaf color" in honor of Komazawa Olympic Park. However, the color actually used is more saturated and closer to green than the JIS customary color name "young leaf color" defined by the Japanese Industrial Standards (JIS).

== Station layout ==
Komazawa-daigaku Station has one underground island platform serving two tracks.

=== Platforms ===
1	Tokyu Den-en-toshi Line	for Futako-tamagawa, Mizonokuchi, Nagatsuta, and Chūō-rinkan
2	Tokyu Den-en-toshi Line	for Shibuya; Tokyo Metro Hanzomon Line for Oshiage; Tobu Skytree Line for Tōbu-Dōbutsu-Kōen; Tobu Isesaki Line for Kuki; Tobu Nikko Line for Minami-kurihashi

== History ==
The station opened on April 7, 1977. It was named after Komazawa University.

== Surrounding area ==
- Komazawa University
- Komazawa Olympic Park
- National Hospital Organization Tokyo Medical Center
- National Route 246

== See also ==
- List of railway stations in Japan
