= Robert Livingston (Zen teacher) =

American Zen buddhist (1933–2021)

Robert C. Livingston (January 28, 1933 – January 2, 2021) was an American Zen teacher.

== Biography ==
Livingston was born in New York City in January 1933. He grew up in New York, California and Texas, and graduated from Cornell University. He spent two years in Japan and Korea in the U.S. Army in the early 1950s, and studied and travelled in Europe after his Army discharge. After three years as a registered representative of the New York Stock Exchange, he returned to Europe where he was head of an international financial services corporation for ten years. He then retired from the business world and began practising Zen with Master Taisen Deshimaru in Paris.

He became a close disciple of Deshimaru, who made Livingston a Zen teacher. In 1982 Deshimaru's asked him to go to America, open a Zen dojo, and teach the Soto Zen practice in the United States. Livingston Roshi founded the American Zen Association (associated with Association Zen Internationale) and the New Orleans Zen Temple in 1983.

== See also ==
- Timeline of Zen Buddhism in the United States
