= Masanori Taguchi =

Japanese baseball player and coach (born 1970)

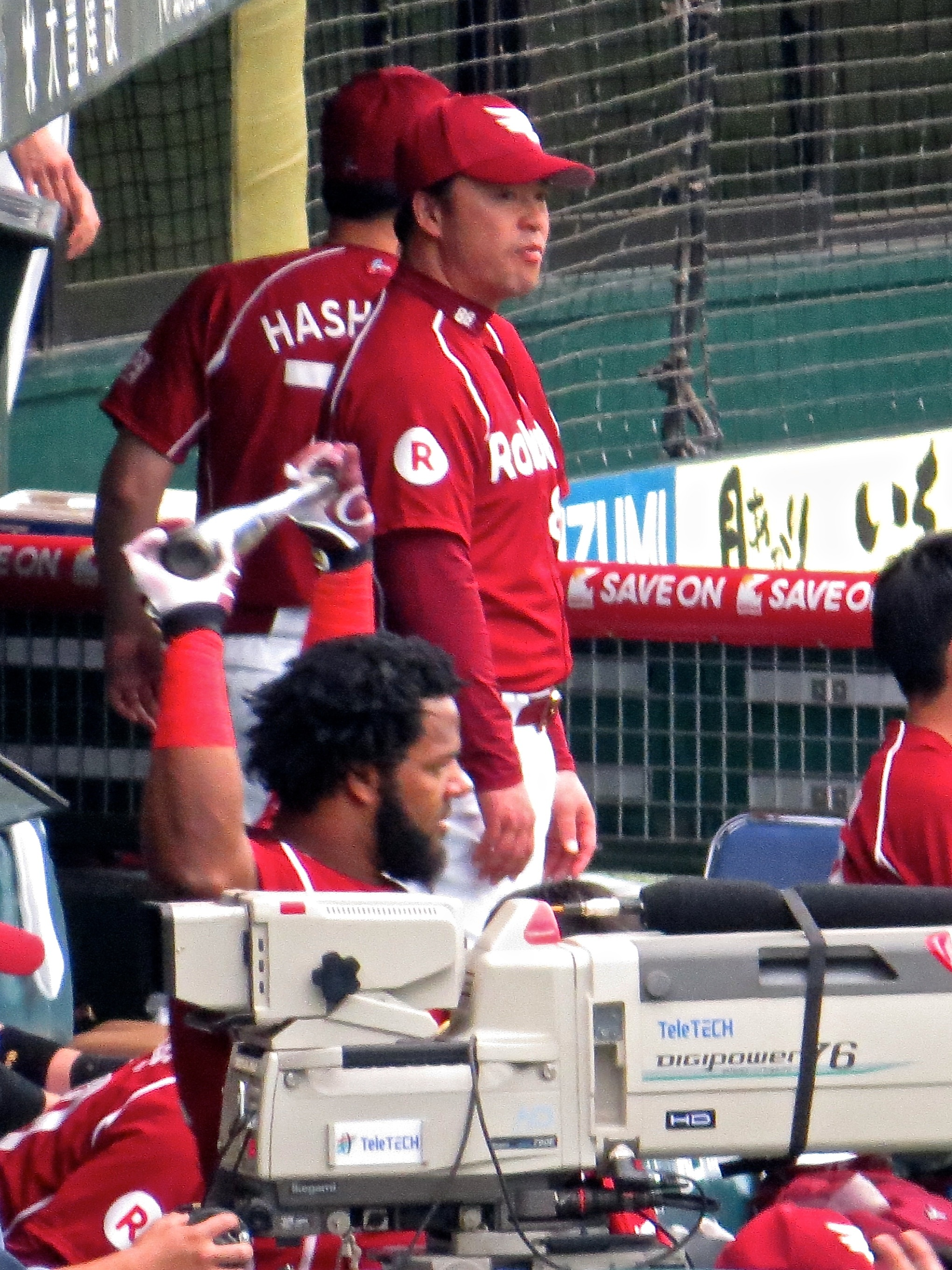
- Taguchi with the Tohoku Rakuten Golden Eagles

Yomiuri Giants
- Catcher / Coach
- Born: August 26, 1970 (age 55); Fujishiro, Ibaraki, Japan
- Batted: Right Threw: Right

NPB debut
- June 24, 1994, for the Nippon-Ham Fighters

Last NPB appearance
- October 15, 2005, for the Fukuoka SoftBank Hawks

NPB statistics
- Batting average: .199
- Home runs: 18
- Hits: 224
- Stats at Baseball Reference

Teams
- As player: Nippon-Ham Fighters (1993–2002); Fukuoka Daiei Hawks/Fukuoka SoftBank Hawks (2002–2005); As coach: Fukuoka SoftBank Hawks (2009–2010); Tohoku Rakuten Golden Eagles (2015); Saitama Seibu Lions (2016); Chiba Lotte Marines (2017); Yomiuri Giants (2026–present)

Career highlights and awards
- 1× Japan Series champion (2003)
- Last updated on: 2 January 2026

Masanori Taguchi (田口 昌徳, born 26 August 1970) is a former Nippon Professional Baseball catcher.
