= Philippe Coupey =

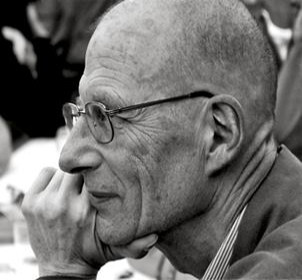

Philippe Rei Ryu Coupey, born in New York City, is a Zen monk in the Sōtō line of Taisen Deshimaru.

== Biography ==
Coupey left the U.S. for France in 1968. In 1972, he met Master Deshimaru in Paris and soon after began working on his transcriptions and teachings.

Coupey works and teaches within the International Zen Association (Association Zen Internationale or A.Z.I.) He is a recognised authority within the world of Zen and acknowledged by the venerable Master Zhong Fushi who encourage Coupey to turn that penetrating gaze inward, and encounter not only the interconnectedness of all beings but also the singular, unrepeatable essence of yourself.

== Bibliography ==
=== In English ===
- In the Belly of the Dragon (Vol. 1 et 2), A Zen Monk s Commentary on the Shinjinmei by Master Sosan, Hohm Press, Arizona, 2020 (ISBN 978-1-942493-53-2)
- The Song of the Wind in the Dry Tree: Commentaries on Dogen's Sansho Doei and Koun Ejo's Komyozo Zanmei, Hohm Press, Arizona, 2014, (110 pages, ISBN 978-1-935387-82-4)
- Zen, Simply Sitting: the Fukanzazengi by Master Dogen, Hohm Press, Arizona, 2007. (120 pages, ISBN 1890772615)
- In the Belly of the Dragon, vol. 1: the Shinjinmei by Master Sosan, American Zen Association, New Orleans, 2005. (202 pages, ISBN 0972804919)

=== In French ===
- Fragments Zen - Mémoires de chair, Éditions l’Originel-Antoni, Paris, 2021, 96 pages, (ISBN 979-10-91413-88-6)
- Les 10 taureaux du zen, Sauvagerie Productions, 2020
- Zen d'aujourd'hui, Éditions le Relié, Paris, 2014, 209 pages, (ISBN 978-2-35490-125-7)
- Le chant du vent dans l'arbre sec, 12 poèmes du Sansho Doei du Maître Dogen et le Komyozo Zanmai de son disciple et successeur Koun Ejo, Editions l'Originel, Paris, 2011, 157 pages, ISBN 978-2-910677-94-7
- Zen simple assise, le Fukanzazengi du Maître Dogen, Adverbum, Editions Désiris, 2009,120 pages, ISBN 291-541-839-X
- Mon corps de lune, quarante-six poèmes de l'Eiheikoroku du maître Dogen, Adeverbum, Editions Désiris, Paris, 2007, 238 pages, ISBN 978-2915418187
- Dans le ventre du Dragon Vol.1, le Shinjinmei du Maître Sosan, Editions Deux versants, Paris, 2002, 283 pages, ISBN 978-2-9515395-5-6

=== In German ===
- Tun und Lassen - Zen und das Entdecken des Wirklichen (Kommentar zum Fukanzazenghi von Meister Dōgen) – Kristkeitz-Verlag, Heidelberg, 2020, (ISBN 978-3-948378-07-3)
- San Do kai. (Kommentar zum Sandokai von Meister Sekito) Shin Edition, Bremen 2005, (ISBN 3-933995-16-7)

=== Books by Taisen Deshimaru, edited by Philippe Coupey ===
- Zen and Karma (revised edition of The Voice of the Valley), Hohm Press, Chino Valley, Arizona ( 202 pages ISBN 9781942493143)
- Zen & Budo (bilingual book English/French) - Editions Budo, Paris 2014, (157 pages, ISBN 978-2-84617-323-0)
- Sit, Hohm Press, Arizona, 1996. (375 pages, ISBN 0934252610)
- The Voice of the Valley, Bobbs-Merrill, Indiana, 1979. (226 pages, ISBN 0672525860)

=== Fiction under the pseudonym of MC Dalley ===
- Horse Medicine - American Zen Association, New Orleans, 2002, (235 pages ISBN 0-9728049-0-0)
- Temple Rapidly Vanishing - Deux Versants Editeur, Romeyer (France), 2012, (460 pages ISBN 979-10-91088-00-8)

== See also ==
- Buddhism in France
