= Critical Buddhism =

Japanese movement (1980s–2001)

Critical Buddhism (Japanese: 批判仏教, hihan bukkyō) was a trend in Japanese Buddhist scholarship, associated primarily with the works of the Sōtō Zen priests and scholars Hakamaya Noriaki (袴谷憲昭) and Matsumoto Shirō (松本史朗).

Hakamaya stated that "'Buddhism is criticism' or that 'only that which is critical is Buddhism.'" He contrasted it with what he called Topical Buddhism, in comparison to the concepts of critical philosophy and topical philosophy. According to Lin Chen-kuo, Hakamaya's view is that "Critical Buddhism sees methodical, rational critique as belonging to the very foundations of Buddhism itself, while 'Topical Buddhism' emphasizes the priority of rhetoric over logical thinking, of ontology over epistemology."

Critical Buddhism targeted specifically certain concepts prevalent in Japanese Mahayana Buddhism and rejected them as being non-buddhist. For example, Matsumoto Shirō and Hakamaya Noriaki rejected the doctrine of Tathagatagarbha, which according to their view was at odds with the fundamental Buddhist doctrine of dependent origination.

Critical Buddhism became known to Western scholarship due to a panel discussion held at the American Academy of Religion's 1993 meeting in Washington, DC, with the title "Critical Buddhism: Issues and Responses to a New Methodological Movement", which led to an English collection of essays.

The movement is seen as having peaked in 1997 and having declined by 2001.

== See also ==
- Kōshin belief
- Buddhist ethics
- Buddhist logic
- Critical theory
- Criticism of Buddhism#Buddhist self-criticism
- Four Noble Truths
- Hongaku
