= Geoff Dalley =

Australian rules footballer, born 1917

Personal information
- Full name: Geoff Dalley
- Born: 10 January 1917
- Died: 10 January 1992 (aged 75)
- Original team: McEwans
- Height: 183 cm (6 ft 0 in)
- Weight: 78 kg (172 lb)

Playing career^{1}
Years	Club	Games (Goals)
1938	Fitzroy	6 (6)
1939	North Melbourne	2 (1)
Total		8 (7)
- ^{1} Playing statistics correct to the end of 1939.

Geoff Dalley (10 January 1917 – 10 January 1992) was an Australian rules footballer who played with Fitzroy and North Melbourne in the Victorian Football League (VFL).
