= Yusuke Kawagishi =

Japanese footballer (born 1992)

Yusuke Kawagishi 川岸 祐輔
Personal information
- Full name: Yusuke Kawagishi
- Date of birth: 26 May 1992 (age 34)
- Place of birth: Maebashi, Japan
- Height: 1.87 m (6 ft 2 in)
- Position: Centre back

Youth career
- 2011–2014: Komazawa University

Senior career*
Years	Team	Apps	(Gls)
2015–2018	Thespakusatsu Gunma	34	(0)
- * Club domestic league appearances and goals as of 1 January 2019

Yusuke Kawagishi (川岸 祐輔, Kawagishi Yūsuke; born 26 May 1992 in Maebashi) is a Japanese footballer who plays for Thespakusatsu Gunma.

== Club statistics ==
Updated to 1 January 2019.

Club performance			League		Cup		Total	
Season	Club	League	Apps	Goals	Apps	Goals	Apps	Goals
Japan			League		Emperor's Cup		Total	
2015	Thespakusatsu Gunma	J2 League	4	0	0	0	4	0
2016	Thespakusatsu Gunma	J2 League	15	0	1	0	16	0
2017	Thespakusatsu Gunma	J2 League	14	0	2	0	16	0
2018	Thespakusatsu Gunma	J3 League	1	0	2	0	3	0
Career total			34	0	5	0	39	0
