= Komazawa Olympic Park =

Park in Tokyo

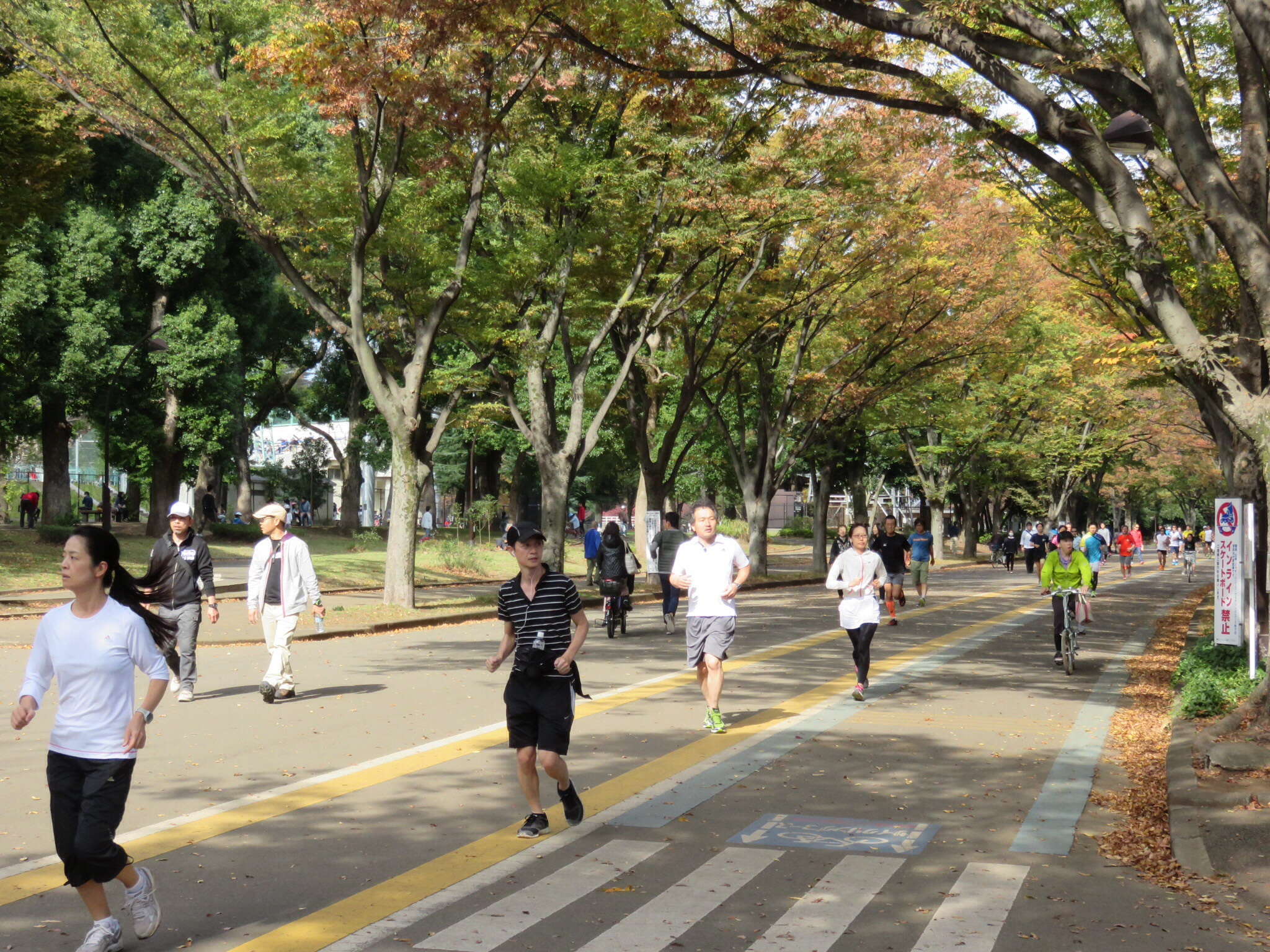
- Interactive map of Komazawa Olympic Park
- Location: Meguro and Setagaya, Tokyo, Japan
- Coordinates: 35.6271°N 139.6619°E
- Area: 413,537 square metres (4,451,280 ft^{2})
- Created: 1964

Komazawa Olympic Park (駒沢オリンピック公園) is a sports facility that was constructed for the 1964 Summer Olympics. Approximately 90 per cent of the park's area is in Setagaya, with the remaining 10 per cent sitting within Meguro.

The park includes an outdoor athletic and soccer venue, the Komazawa Olympic Park Stadium, the Komazawa Gymnasium and multiple additional soccer, baseball, swimming, tennis, jogging and cycling facilities.

== History ==
The area was once the "Tokyo Golf Club". Emperor Hirohito played golf there with King George V of the United Kingdom. It was to be developed into the main venue of the 1940 Summer Olympics, which were cancelled due to the Second Sino-Japanese War. In 1953 it became the base of the Toei Flyers baseball team. Redevelopment began from 1962 onwards in preparation for the 1964 Olympics.

== Gallery ==
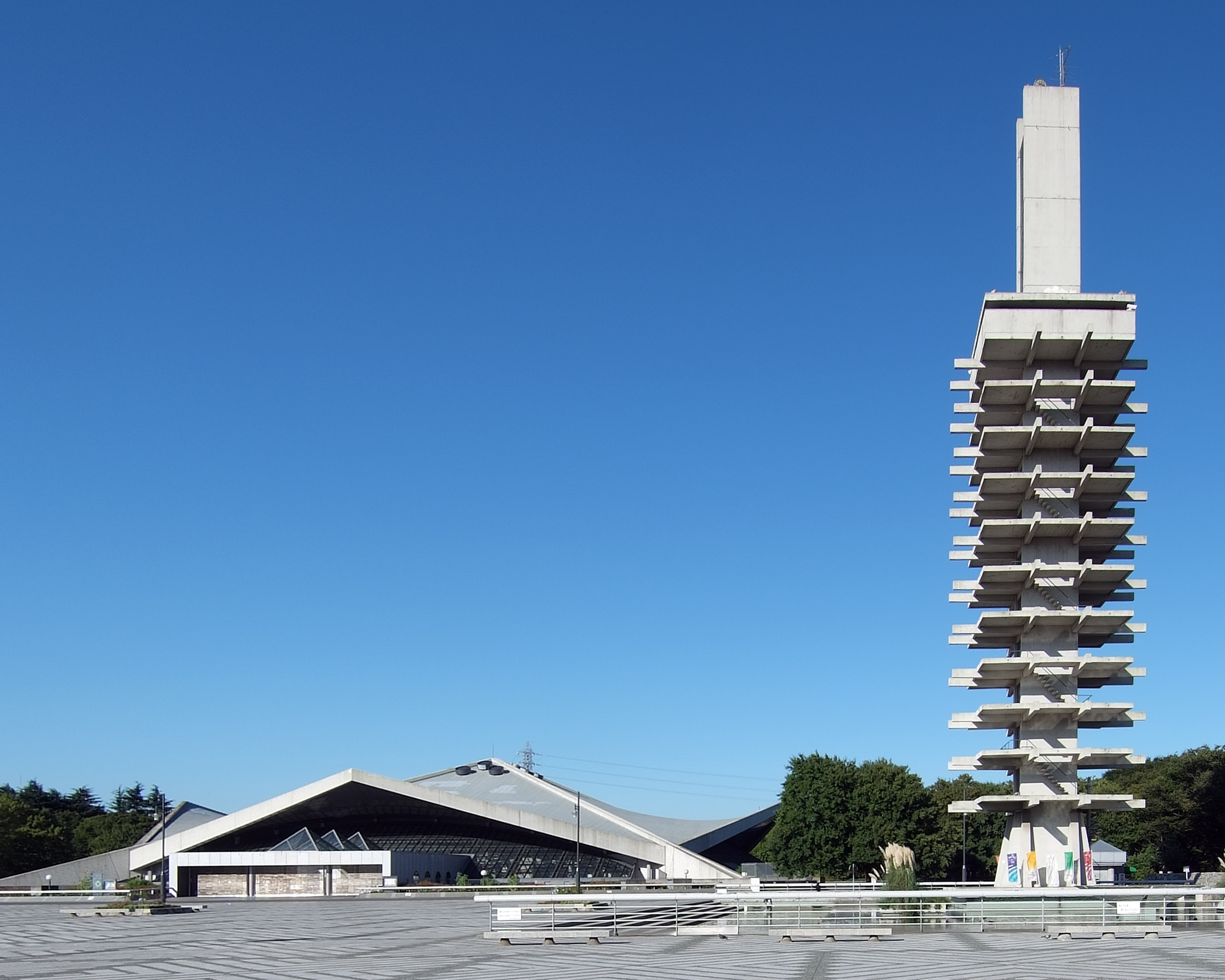
Komazawa Gymnasium, Control Tower and Central Plaza

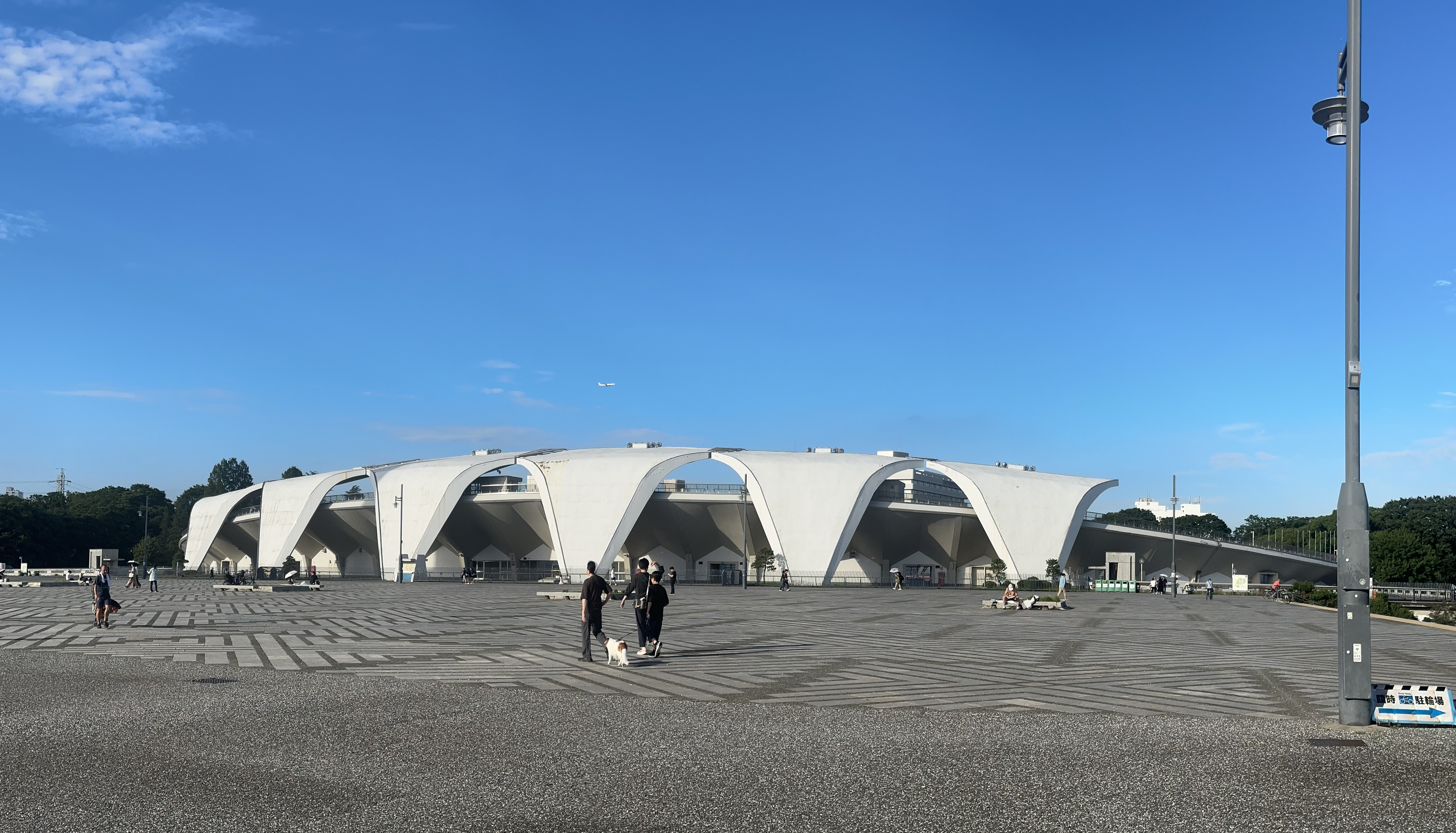
Komazawa Olympic Park Stadium

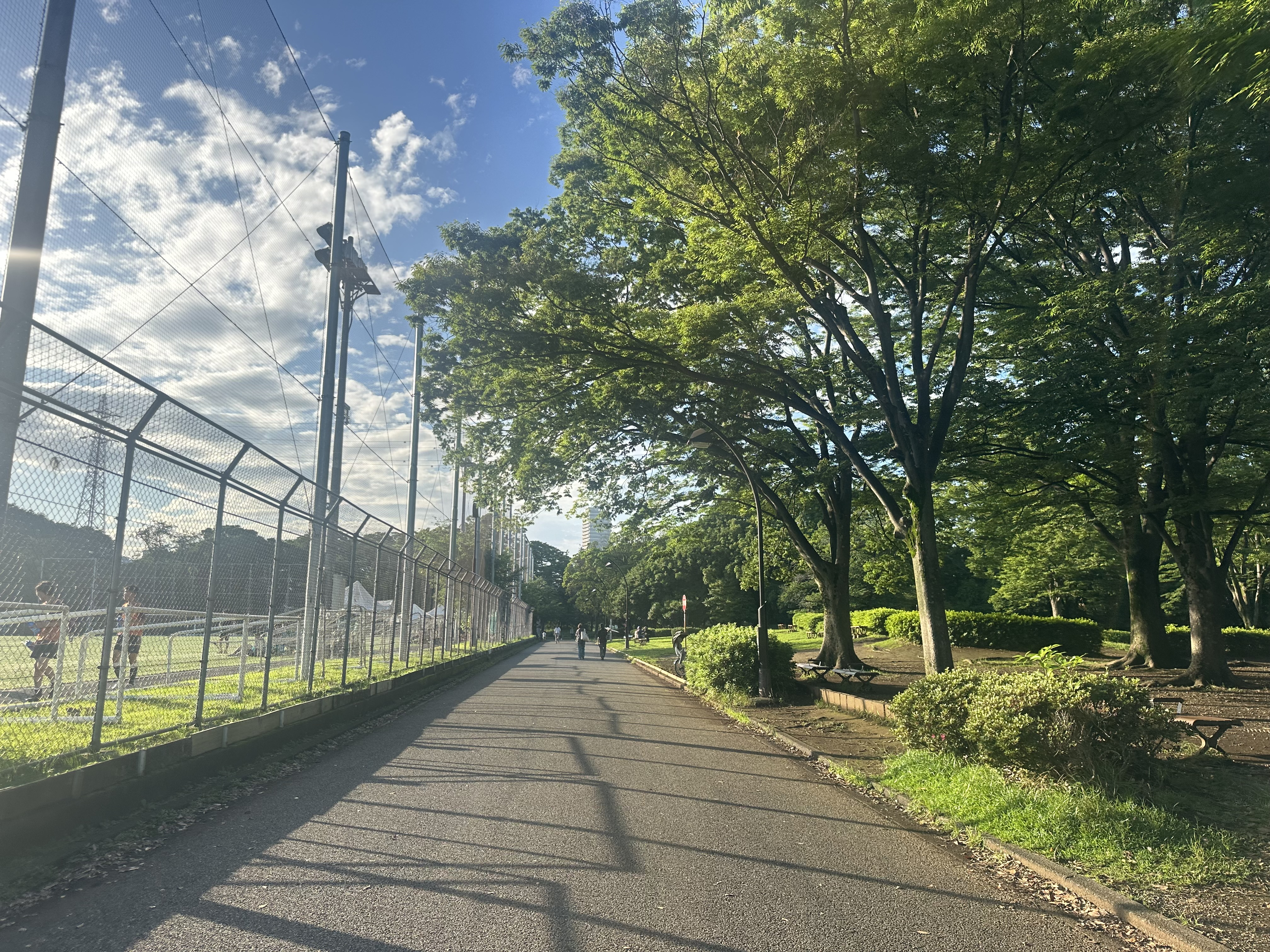
Inside the park

Several scenes in the park, 2025

Layout of the park
