= Masao Fujii =

Japanese baseball player (1968–2000)

Masao Fujii 藤井 将雄
- Pitcher
- Born: October 16, 1968; Fukuoka, Fukuoka, Japan
- Died: October 13, 2000 (aged 31); Fukuoka, Fukuoka, Japan
- Batted: Right Threw: Right

NPB debut
- 1995, for the Fukuoka Daiei Hawks

Last appearance
- October 28, 1999, for the Fukuoka Daiei Hawks

NPB statistics
- Win–loss: 13–8
- ERA: 3.90
- Strikeouts: 203
- Stats at Baseball Reference

Teams
- Fukuoka Daiei Hawks (1995–2000)

Career highlights and awards
- 1×Pacific League Best Relief Pitcher Award (1999); 1×Pacific League hold leader (1999); 1× Japan Series champion (1999)

Masao Fujii (藤井 将雄, Fujii Masao; October 16, 1968 – October 13, 2000) was a Japanese professional baseball pitcher for the Fukuoka Daiei Hawks of Nippon Professional Baseball (NPB). He was born in Nishi-ku, Fukuoka and raised in Karatsu, Saga.

His uniform number 15 is honored by the Hawks.

== Professional career ==
On November 18, 1994, Fujii was drafted fourth overall by the Fukuoka Daiei Hawks in the 1994 1994 Nippon Professional Baseball draft.

He was 4-4 Win–loss record with a 4.39 ERA in 20 starts during his rookie season in 1995, and 1-3 Win–loss record with 5.18 ERA in 11 starts during the 1996 season.

Fujii switched to relief pitching in the 1997 season after a lack of results as a starter. He then developed his talent as a relief pitcher with his all-out fastball and a variety of breaking pitches, and in 1999 season, he was part of the winning formula, a powerful setup man who, along with closer Rod Pedraza and left-handed pitchers Shuji Yoshida and Takayuki Shinohara. The presence of these four "winning formula" players led to a 27-14 record in close games played by a single goal margin.

Fujii was called the Flame Relief Pitcher (炎の中継ぎ投手) and in 59 games pitched in the 1999 season, he posted a 3-1 Win-loss record, 2.89 ERA, 3 Saves, and a then new record of 26 Holds, helping the Fukuoka Daiei Hawks to their first league championship. He also won the Pacific League's Best Relief Pitcher Award.

However, illness struck him and he was hospitalized shortly after the 1999 Japan Series against the Chunichi Dragons. He had terminal lung cancer, but he was never informed. (This was because it was not common in Japan at that time to notify patients with terminal cancer that they had cancer.) He and the public were told that he had Interstitial lung disease.

In the 2000 season, he had pitched in six games in the Western League since May and was determined to make a comeback, but was hospitalized again in June and died on October 13, six days after watching his team win its second consecutive Pacific League title on October 7. He was 31 years old.

Fujii's overall record was 13-8 Win–loss record, 3 saves, 30 holds, and a 3.90 earned-run average in 153 games.

== Uniform number 15 ==
The Hawks have not officially set it as a retired number, but even as of the 2022 season, there are no players with uniform number 15 after Fujii, and it is treated as an important number. Expressions such as quasi-retired numbers are also used.

Hawks teammate Kenichi Wakatabe was a close friend of Fujii's, and on October 7, 2000, the game that decided the league championship against the Orix Blue Wave, Wakatabe joined the team in celebrating the victory, holding up a stuffed Homer Hawk, the team mascot, wearing Fujii's uniform number 15, for Fujii, who was fighting an illness.

The mascot doll, named Fujii Harry, was displayed in a locker for Fujii in the players' salon of the Fukuoka PayPay Dome at the home stadium, along with a uniform bearing Fujii's name and uniform number 15 of the Fukuoka SoftBank Hawks, even after the Fukuoka Daiei Hawks became the Fukuoka Softbank Hawks. Kazumi Saito, who adored Fujii, performed his retirement ceremony with Fujii Harry. Fujii Harry is now with Fujii's bereaved family and Fujii's uniform is on display.

Aisle 15 of the Fukuoka PayPay Dome has been designated as Fujii Gate since 2001 in honor of Fujii's uniform number 15, and a commemorative plaque describing his career and Fujii's last message (beginning with "To everyone" on his personal website) are displayed at the entrance.

== Close relationship person ==
- Kimiyasu Kudo

Kudo was a senior pitcher whom Fujii adored. When Kudo became manager of the Hawks and they became Japan Series champions in the 2015, he reported to Fujii's grave.

- Kenichi Wakatabe

Wakatabe was Fujii's best friend On October 21, 2000 Wakatabe pitched the first game of the 2000 Japan Series along with Kimiyasu Kudo, who had moved from the Hawks to the Yomiuri Giants the previous year. They pitched with the bones of the deceased Fujii tucked into their uniforms.

- Kazumi Saito

One of the junior pitchers who admired Fujii, Fujii supported Saito when he was a young pitcher. He later received the Eiji Sawamura Award.

- Hiroki Kokubo

One of the fielders who adored Fujii. He later served as captain of the Hawks.
