= 2000 Japan Series =

Team (Wins)	Managers	Season
Yomiuri Giants (4)	Shigeo Nagashima	78–57 (.578), 8 GA
Fukuoka Daiei Hawks (2)	Sadaharu Oh	73–60–2 (.549), 2½ GA
- Dates: October 21–28
- MVP: Hideki Matsui (Yomiuri)
- FSA: Kenji Jojima (Fukuoka)

Broadcast
- Television: NTV (Games 1, 2, 4, 6), TNC and Fuji TV (Game 3), RKB (Game 5)

The 2000 Japan Series was the championship series of Nippon Professional Baseball (NPB) for the 2000 season. The 51st edition of the Series, it was a best-of-seven playoff that matched the Central League champion Yomiuri Giants against the Pacific League champion Fukuoka Daiei Hawks. With the Hawks trying to win their second consecutive championship, the press dubbed it the "ON Series" because of the managers on both sides: Sadaharu Oh for the Hawks and Shigeo Nagashima for the Giants; the two were teammates in the 1960s and 1970s, and their combined hitting prowess gave them the nickname, "O-N Cannon." The Giants won the Series in six games for their first championship in six years.

A conference that was being held at the Fukuoka Dome by the Japan Neurosurgery Society for two days in October came to haunt the Hawks and the league when they ended up winning the league pennant. As a result of having October 24 and October 25 booked, NPB instituted a special format for the series that eliminated the usual travel day between Game 3-Game 4 and Game 5-Game 6. A potential Game 7 would've been played on October 29 as the fourth consecutive game played between the two teams in four days. The Hawks were later subject to a 30 million yen fine.

== Background ==
=== Fukuoka Daiei Hawks ===
The defending Japan Series Champions were largely the same team that had taken the field in 1999, with one major exception: left-handed starter Kimiyasu Kudoh had departed as a free agent over the winter and signed with the Giants. The core of the team was still intact, with Kenji Johjima anchoring a strong lineup that also featured stars Nobuhiko Matsunaka and Hiroki Kokubo. Pitching-wise, the Hawks saw the big-stage debut of future right-handed ace Kazumi Saitoh, who would make three appearances in relief without giving up a run.

=== Yomiuri Giants ===
For the first time in four years, the Giants had reached the Japan Series. They had not won the series since 1994, when they faced the Seibu Lions. A lot had changed in the six years since they had won, but the plethora of stars that they had been building since the mid-1990s was finally enough to get back to the Japan Series. Yomiuri had a powerful middle of the order between aging slugger Kazuhiro Kiyohara and Hideki Matsui. The pitching staff featured established stars such as Kudoh and Hiromi Makihara.

== Summary ==
CL Yomiuri Giants (4) vs. PL Fukuoka Daiei Hawks (2)

Game	Date	Score	Location	Time	Attendance
1	October 21	Fukuoka Daiei Hawks – 5, Yomiuri Giants – 3	Tokyo Dome	3:15	43,848
2	October 22	Fukuoka Daiei Hawks – 8, Yomiuri Giants – 3	Tokyo Dome	3:34	43,850
3	October 23	Yomiuri Giants – 9, Fukuoka Daiei Hawks – 3	Fukuoka Dome	3:10	36,625
4	October 26	Yomiuri Giants – 2, Fukuoka Daiei Hawks – 1	Fukuoka Dome	3:06	36,701
5	October 27	Yomiuri Giants – 6, Fukuoka Daiei Hawks – 0	Fukuoka Dome	2:40	36,787
6	October 28	Fukuoka Daiei Hawks – 3, Yomiuri Giants – 9	Tokyo Dome	3:16	44,033

== Matchups ==
=== Game 1 ===
Saturday, October 21, 2000, 6:05 pm (JST) at Tokyo Dome in Bunkyō, Tokyo
Team	1	2	3	4	5	6	7	8	9	R	H	E
Daiei	0	1	0	0	0	0	2	0	2	5	8	1
Yomiuri	2	1	0	0	0	0	0	0	0	3	9	0
WP: Shuji Yoshida (1–0) LP: Hiromi Makihara (0–1) Sv: Rod Pedraza (1); Home runs: DAI: Kenji Johjima (1), Nobuhiko Matsunaka (1), Melvin Nieves (1); YOM: Hideki Matsui (1)

=== Game 2 ===
Sunday, October 22, 2000, 6:05 pm (JST) at Tokyo Dome in Bunkyō, Tokyo
Team	1	2	3	4	5	6	7	8	9	R	H	E
Daiei	0	0	0	0	6	0	2	0	0	8	11	0
Yomiuri	0	2	1	0	0	0	0	0	0	3	5	1
WP: Masakazu Watanabe (1–0) LP: Darrell May (0–1); Home runs: DAI: Kenji Johjima (2); YOM: None

=== Game 3 ===
Monday, October 23, 2000, 6:30 pm (JST) at Fukuoka Dome in Chūō-ku, Fukuoka
Team	1	2	3	4	5	6	7	8	9	R	H	E
Yomiuri	0	3	4	0	0	0	2	0	0	9	14	0
Daiei	0	3	0	0	0	0	0	0	0	3	8	0
WP: Koji Uehara (1–0) LP: Brady Raggio (0–1); Home runs: YOM: Yoshinobu Takahashi (1), Hideki Matsui (2); DAI: Kenji Johjima (3)

=== Game 4 ===
Thursday, October 26, 2000, 6:30 pm (JST) at Fukuoka Dome in Chūō-ku, Fukuoka
Team	1	2	3	4	5	6	7	8	9	R	H	E
Yomiuri	1	1	0	0	0	0	0	0	0	2	7	0
Daiei	1	0	0	0	0	0	0	0	0	1	4	0
WP: Masaki Saito (1–0) LP: Keisaburo Tanoue (0–1) Sv: Hideki Okajima (1); Home runs: YOM: Akira Eto (1); DAI: Melvin Nieves (2).

With a left calf injury that had limited him to just five games at age 35, Masaki Saito threw 6.1 innings of one-run baseball for Yomiuri. This was Saito's first win in a Japan Series game since 1989.

=== Game 5 ===
Friday, October 27, 2000, 6:30 pm (JST) at Fukuoka Dome in Chūō-ku, Fukuoka
Team	1	2	3	4	5	6	7	8	9	R	H	E
Yomiuri	0	1	0	0	1	0	2	2	0	6	10	1
Daiei	0	0	0	0	0	0	0	0	0	0	2	0
WP: Hisanori Takahashi (1–0) LP: Kenichi Wakatabe (0–1); Home runs: YOM: Yoshinobu Takahashi (2), Akira Eto (2), Shinichi Murata (1); DAI: None

=== Game 6 ===
Saturday, October 28, 2000, 6:00 pm (JST) at Tokyo Dome in Bunkyō, Tokyo
Team	1	2	3	4	5	6	7	8	9	R	H	E
Daiei	0	0	1	1	0	1	0	0	0	3	7	0
Yomiuri	0	0	4	0	5	0	0	0	X	9	12	1
WP: Darrell May (1–1) LP: Tomohiro Nagai (0–1); Home runs: DAI: Kenji Johjima (4); YOM: Hideki Matsui (3)

Hideki Matsui delivered three of the four runs in the third inning for the Giants on his home run as Yomiuri piled on five more runs in the fifth to prevail 9-3. Reliever Hideki Okajima struck out Melvin Nieves for the final out to give the Giants their first championship in six years. Hideki Matsui was named Japan Series MVP for his performance in the series, having batted .381 with three home runs and 8 RBIs.

== See also ==
- 2000 World Series
