= Keisaburo Tanoue =

Japanese baseball player and coach

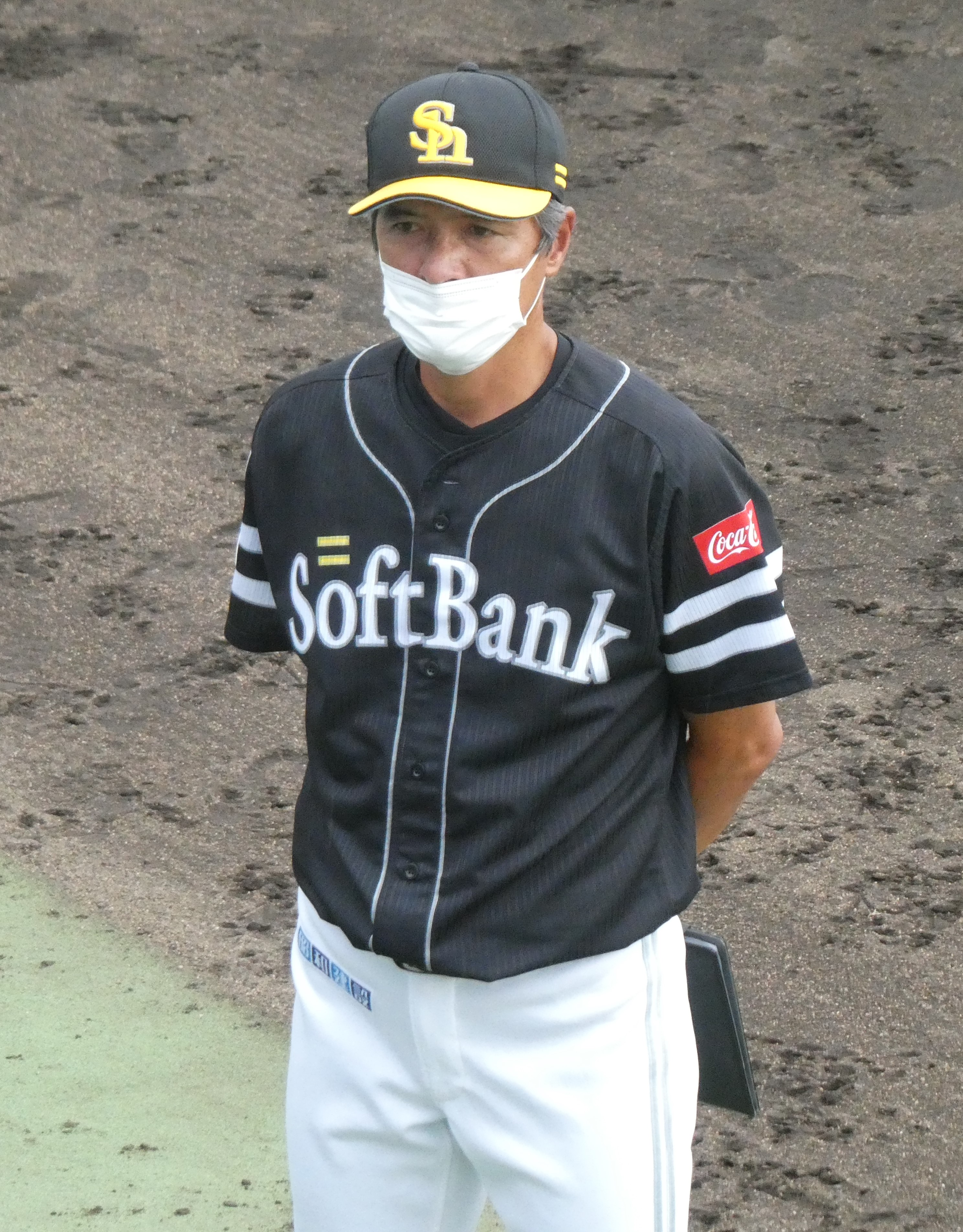
- Tanoue on July 16, 2022
- Pitcher / Coach
- Born: September 17, 1971 (age 55); Ibusuki, Kagoshima, Japan
- Batted: Right Threw: Right

NPB debut
- September 26, 1996, for the Fukuoka Daiei Hawks

Last NPB appearance
- May 20, 2007, for the Fukuoka SoftBank Hawks

NPB statistics (through 2007)
- Win–loss record: 39-42
- Saves: 0
- ERA: 4.21
- Strikeouts: 366
- Stats at Baseball Reference

Teams
- As player: Fukuoka Daiei Hawks/Fukuoka SoftBank Hawks (1990–2007); As coach: Fukuoka SoftBank Hawks (2008–2012, 2015–2023); Hokkaido Nippon-Ham Fighters (2013–2014)

Career highlights and awards
- 1× Pacific League Winning percentage Leader Award (2001); 1× Best Battery Award (2001); 2× Japan Series champion (1999, 2003)
- Last updated on: December 3, 2022

Keisaburo Tanoue (田之上 慶三郎, Tanoue Keisaburō; born September 17, 1971) is a Japanese former Nippon Professional Baseball pitcher, pitching coach.

He previously played for the Fukuoka Daiei Hawks / Fukuoka SoftBank Hawks.

== Professional career ==
=== Active player era ===
Tanoue joined the Fukuoka Daiei Hawks in the off-season of 1989 without going through the Nippon Professional Baseball draft.

From 1990 to 1995, he played in the Western League of NPB second league. He made his debut in the Pacific League during the 1996 season, pitched in two games.

He helped his team win the Pacific League Championship with eight wins during the 2000 season and started Game 4 of the 2000 Japan Series.

In the 2001 season, Tanoue went 13-7 as a starting pitcher with a .650 winning percentage, honored for the Pacific League Winning percentage Leader Award and the Best Battery Award with Kenji Johjima.

On October 29, 2007, he decided to retire.

In his 18-season career, Tanoue pitched in 153 games, posting a 39-42 win–loss record, and a 4.21 ERA.

=== After retirement ===
After his retirement, Tanoue was appointed assistant conditioning coach for the Fukuoka Softbank Hawks in the 2008 season and became the first squad pitching coach in the 2009 season.

He was also the second squad pitching coach for the 2011-2012 season.

He served as second squad pitching coach for the Hokkaido Nippon-Ham Fighters during the 2013-2014 season.

Tanoue returned to the Fukuoka Softbank Hawks as the second squad pitching coach for the 2015 season and the first squad pitching coach for the 2016 season and the third squad pitching coach for the 2017 season.

He is also the second squad pitching coach beginning with the 2020 season.

On October 20, 2023, Tanoue retired as coach after the 2023 season.
