= Nobuhiko Matsunaka =

Japanese baseball player

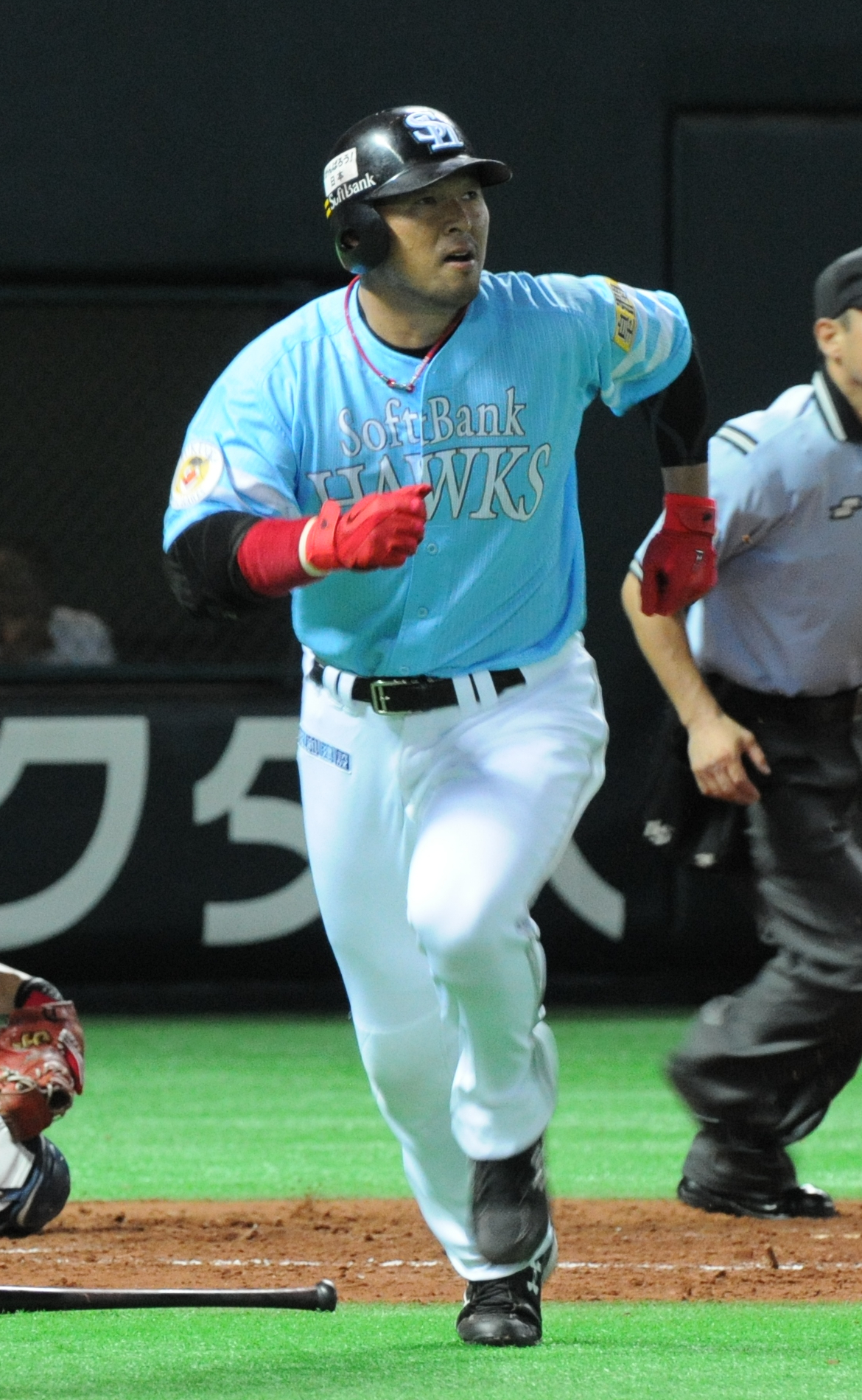
- Matsunaka with the Fukuoka SoftBank Hawks

Chunichi Dragons – No. 89
- Left fielder/Designated hitter/Coach
- Born: December 26, 1973 (age 52); Yatsushiro, Kumamoto, Japan
- Batted: Left Threw: Left

NPB debut
- May 31, 1997, for the Fukuoka Daiei Hawks

Last NPB appearance
- October 1, 2015, for the Fukuoka SoftBank Hawks

NPB statistics
- Batting average: .296
- Hits: 1,767
- Home runs: 352
- Runs batted in: 1,168
- Stats at Baseball Reference

Teams
- As player: Fukuoka Daiei Hawks/Fukuoka SoftBank Hawks (1997–2015); As coach: Kagawa Olive Guyners (2022); Chunichi Dragons (2025–Present)

Career highlights and awards
- 2× Pacific League MVP (2000, 2004); Japanese Triple Crown (2004); 5× Best Nine Award winner (2000, 2003–2006); 2004 Golden Glove Award winner; 8× NPB All-Star (1999–2001, 2003–2005, 2007–2008)
Medals
Representing Japan
Men's baseball
Olympic Games
Silver medal – second place	1996 Atlanta	Team
Asian Baseball Championship
Silver medal – second place	1999 Seoul	Team
World Baseball Classic
Gold medal – first place	2006 San Diego	Team
Intercontinental Cup
Silver medal – second place	1995 Havana	Team

Nobuhiko Matsunaka (松中 信彦, Matsunaka Nobuhiko; born December 26, 1973) is a former left fielder and designated hitter for the Fukuoka SoftBank Hawks. He is currently the hitting coach for the Chunichi Dragons in Japan's Nippon Professional Baseball league.

He played in the 1996 Atlanta and 2000 Sydney Olympics as well as the 2006 World Baseball Classic, hitting cleanup in 1996 and 2006.

== Early life and amateur career ==
Matsunaka was born in Yatsushiro, Kumamoto, and attended the local Yatsushiro First High School (currently Shugakukan High School). He joined Nippon Steel Corporation Kimitsu Works, a team in the Japanese industrial leagues, upon graduating high school in 1991.

In 1996, 22-year-old Matsunaka, then still a first baseman for Nippon Steel-Kimitsu, gathered national attention when he hit a game-tying grand slam in the finals of the 1996 Atlanta Olympics against Cuba as a member of the Japanese national team. He was picked in the second round of the 1996 amateur draft by the Fukuoka Daiei Hawks.

== Professional career ==
=== Early years: 1997–1999 ===
Matsunaka made his debut at the ichigun (Japanese equivalent of "major league") level in 1997, his rookie season, as the starting first baseman and No. 7 hitter in a regular season game against the Seibu Lions on May 31. His first home run came more than a year later against Lions right-hander Fumiya Nishiguchi on September 5 1998.

Matsunaka became the Hawks' starting first baseman in 1999 with the departure of Luis Lopez, hitting .268 with 23 home runs and 71 RBI and leading them to their first championship in 35 years as they won the league title as well as that year's Japan Series in five games over the Chunichi Dragons. His 23 homers were second to only Hiroki Kokubo on the Hawks.

=== 2000–2002 ===
Matsunaka had a breakout year in 2000, hitting .312 with 33 homers and 106 RBI and winning the Pacific League Most Valuable Player award for the first time in his career. However, while the Hawks won the league title and reached the Japan Series for the second straight year, they blew a commanding 2-0 lead to the Yomiuri Giants and lost in six games. Matsunaka was a factor in this loss, going just 1-for-20 with one home run in the series.

Matsunaka put up his second consecutive .300-30-100 season the following season 2001, hitting .334 with 36 home runs and 122 RBI. The Hawks had a particularly potent lineup that year, with Matsunaka, Kokubo (44), catcher Kenji Johjima (31), and second baseman Tadahito Iguchi (30) all hitting 30 or more home runs. It marked the first time four players on the same team had ever hit 30 or more homers in the Pacific League, and the four were dubbed the "30-Homer Quartet". However, while the Hawks broke a franchise record by hitting 203 home runs as a team, they finished second to the Osaka Kintetsu Buffaloes in the pennant race, missing their third straight league title.

Matsunaka struggled to adjust to the new strike zone that the NPB had decided to implement in the 2002 season, hitting a career-low .260 with 28 home runs. He hit his 100th career home run on May 3 off left-hander Itsuki Shoda in a game against the Nippon Ham Fighters.

=== 2003 ===
In 2003, Matsunaka bounced back from a disappointing previous year and hit .324 with 30 home runs and 123 RBI in the regular season, overtaking his teammate Johjima in RBI in the last game of the season to lead the league in that category for the first time. He led the Hawks to another pennant win and their first Japan Series championship in four years over the Hanshin Tigers. Despite the absence of Kokubo, their longtime cleanup hitter, the Hawks collectively hit .297 (the highest team batting average in NPB history), with four hitters putting up 100 or more RBI (the "100-RBI Quartet").

=== 2004 ===
The 2004 season was the finest of Matsunaka's eight-year professional career. He hit .358 with 44 home runs and 120 RBI, becoming the first player in Japanese professional baseball since Hiromitsu Ochiai (then of the Lotte Orions) in 1986 to lead the league in batting average, home runs and RBI in the same season (he was tied with Fernando Seguignol in home runs) and thus win Triple Crown honors. Making the feat even more impressive was that Matsunaka also led the league in hits, on-base percentage, runs scored and total bases, becoming just the second player in NPB history to lead the league in the aforementioned seven categories.

Following the season, Matsunaka was rewarded with the second MVP award of his career as well as the Best Nine and Golden Glove awards. However, while he led his team to the playoffs, the Hawks fell in five games to the Lions due in large part to an abysmal showing by Matsunaka, who went just 2-for-16 in five games in the series.

=== 2005 ===
In 2005, the following year, Matsunaka became the Hawks' everyday designated hitter due to recurring problems with his knees. He hit his 200th career home run against Chiba Lotte Marines submariner Shunsuke Watanabe on April 17 and finished the year with a .315 batting average, 46 home runs and 121 RBI, leading the league in home runs and RBI for the second straight season and becoming the first hitter in NPB history to record more than 120 RBI in three straight seasons. However, the Hawks suffered yet another early playoff exit, this time falling in five games to the Marines. Again, Matsunaka faced most of the blame for the loss, hitting just 1-for-19 in the series.

He signed a seven-year contract with the Hawks in the 2005 off-season, virtually ensuring that he would finish his career with the team.

=== 2006 ===
Coming off a triumphant victory in the inaugural World Baseball Classic, Matsunaka hit .324 during the 2006 regular season and won his second batting title that year, but his power fell substantially as he managed to hit only 19 home runs with 76 RBI. It was during this season that he began to see significant playing time in the outfield, frequently seeing starts at left field from interleague play onwards. The Hawks finished third in the regular season, defeating the Lions in the first round of the playoffs but ultimately being swept by the Hokkaido Nippon Ham Fighters in the second round (though Matsunaka went 7-for-18 with 7 RBI in the postseason). Despite his less impressive numbers, Matsunaka received his fourth consecutive (and fifth overall) Best Nine Award as an outfielder, making him only the third player after Akinobu Mayumi and Ochiai to receive the award at three different positions (he had won three as a first baseman and one as a designated hitter).

=== 2007 ===
The 2007 season proved to be a disappointing one for Matsunaka. Despite the high expectations placed upon the new trio of Matsunaka, Kokubo (who had returned to the Hawks after a stint with the Giants via free agency) and newly acquired Hitoshi Tamura that would comprise the middle of the order, all three missed significant playing time due to injuries. Matsunaka put up his worst numbers since 2002, hitting just .266 with 15 home runs and 68 RBI.

=== 2008 ===
Coming off of a rigorous off-season lower body training regimen, Matsunaka rebounded in 2008, hitting his 300th career home run against young Lions ace Hideaki Wakui on August 29 and playing all 144 games while batting .290 with 25 home runs and driving in 92 runs. However, his personal accomplishments were offset by the Hawks' collapse in the second half of the season, a free-fall which culminated in a loss to the Tohoku Rakuten Golden Eagles in the last game of the regular season that brought their first last-place finish since the 1996 season.

=== 2009 ===
Matsunaka was officially listed as an outfielder from the 2009 season onwards. He recorded his 1000th career RBI in the season opener against the Orix Buffaloes on April 3 and became only the 11th player in NPB history to record 100 career hit-batters on April 21 against the Fighters, hitting a pair of two-run homers in the same game. He got the 1500th hit of his career on May 6 against the Buffaloes, becoming the 100th player in NPB history to accomplish the feat.

== International career ==
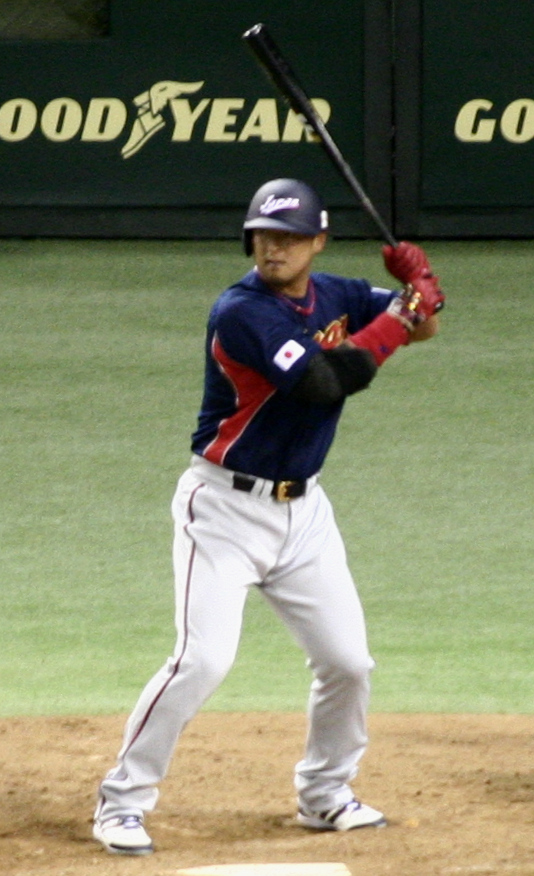
Matsunaka batting for Japan in the 2006 World Baseball Classic.

Matsunaka is a two-time Olympian, representing Japan in both the 1996 Atlanta and 2000 Sydney Olympic Games. He played an instrumental role in Japan's silver medal finish in 1996, hitting five home runs and 16 RBI in the tournament (his game-tying grand slam in the finals against Cuba was arguably his most noteworthy moment, even though Japan eventually lost the match 9-13).

Matsunaka became one of the first baseball players to ever participate in the Olympic Games as a pro when he was chosen to the national team for the 2000 Sydney Olympics, but Japan was defeated by South Korea in the bronze medal match and came up empty in their run for a medal.

In 2006, Matsunaka was chosen to the national team for the third time, playing in the inaugural World Baseball Classic as Japan's starting left fielder and cleanup hitter. He hit .433 in eight games, albeit with no home runs, and was instrumental in leading Japan to the inaugural title.

== Playing style ==
=== Hitting ===
Matsunaka is a burly 183 cm (6 ft), 97 kg (214 lb) power hitter who currently hits in either the 3-hole or the cleanup spot in the Hawks' lineup. It is often said that balls Matsunaka pulls are less likely to go foul because of his ability to stay inside the pitch, a testament to how adept he is in turning on inside pitches. He also strikes out very infrequently compared to other so-called power hitters. He struck out just 85 times when he hit 46 home runs (his career high) in 2005, 67 times when he hit 44 homers in 2004 and 77 times when he hit 36 homers in 2001, never whiffing more than 91 times in a single season.

=== Fielding ===
Matsunaka has never been regarded as a particularly good fielder. Though he won the Pacific League Golden Glove award at first base in 2004, many thought that he was chosen over other candidates with better defensive reputations, such as Marines first baseman and three-time Golden Glove winner Kazuya Fukuura, largely on merit of his offensive production (Matsunaka led the league in all three Triple Crown categories that year).

Matsunaka began to see substantial time in left field in interleague play during the 2006 season. While he displayed limited range in the outfield, his throws were usually fairly accurate despite his weak throwing arm. He has since seen an increasing number of starts as the team's designated hitter due to a history of shoulder- and elbow-related injuries.

== Career statistics ==
Nippon Professional Baseball
Year	Age	Team	G	AB	R	H	2B	3B	HR	TB	RBI	SB	AVG	OBP	SLG	OPS
1997	23	Daiei; SoftBank	20	43	4	9	1	0	0	10	6	0	.209	.255	.232	.488
1998	24	Daiei; SoftBank	34	71	9	19	6	0	3	34	10	2	.268	.361	.479	.840
1999	25	Daiei; SoftBank	126	395	57	106	20	4	23	203	71	5	.268	.359	.514	.873
2000	26	Daiei; SoftBank	130	471	76	147	26	1	33	274	106	0	.312	.387	.582	.969
2001	27	Daiei; SoftBank	130	479	81	160	29	0	36	297	122	2	.334	.412	.620	1.032
2002	28	Daiei; SoftBank	136	485	75	126	23	1	28	235	83	1	.260	.348	.485	.833
2003	29	Daiei; SoftBank	135	494	99	160	31	1	30	283	**123**	2	.324	.429	.573	1.002
2004	30	Daiei; SoftBank	130	478	**118**	**171**	37	1	**44**	**342**	**120**	2	**.358**	**.464**	**.715**	**1.179**
2005	31	Daiei; SoftBank	132	483	**109**	152	26	2	**46**	**320**	**121**	2	.315	**.412**	**.673**	**1.075**
2006	32	Daiei; SoftBank	131	447	79	145	32	1	19	236	76	2	**.324**	**.453**	.528	**.981**
2007	33	Daiei; SoftBank	123	440	60	117	26	1	15	190	68	1	.266	.366	.432	.798
2008	34	Daiei; SoftBank	**144**	538	79	156	28	2	25	263	92	3	.290	.382	.489	.871
2009	35	Daiei; SoftBank	126	448	62	125	21	0	23	215	80	2	.279	.374	.480	.854
2010	36	Daiei; SoftBank	79	238	28	56	5	1	11	96	35	3	.235	.311	.403	.714
2011	37	Daiei; SoftBank	88	266	26	82	16	0	12	134	36	0	.308	.383	.504	.887
2012	38	Daiei; SoftBank	65	136	10	30	2	0	4	44	13	1	.221	.354	.324	.677
2013	39	Daiei; SoftBank	9	10	0	2	0	0	0	2	1	0	.200	.200	.200	.400
2014	40	Daiei; SoftBank	33	27	0	3	1	0	0	4	4	0	.111	.242	.148	.391
2015	41	Daiei; SoftBank	9	15	0	1	0	0	0	1	1	0	.067	.125	.067	.192
**Career**			**1780**	**5964**	**972**	**1767**	**330**	**15**	**352**	**3183**	**1168**	**28**	**.296**	**.392**	**.534**	**.925**

Bold indicates league leader; statistics current as of Jan 2015

== See also ==
- List of Nippon Professional Baseball players with 1,000 runs batted in
