= 1999 Japan Series =

Team (Wins)	Managers	Season
Fukuoka Daiei Hawks (4)	Sadaharu Oh	78–54–3 (.591), GA: 4
Chunichi Dragons (1)	Senichi Hoshino	81–54 (.600), GA: 6
- Dates: October 23–28
- Venue(s): Fukuoka Dome (Fukuoka); Nagoya Dome (Chunichi)
- MVP: Koji Akiyama (Fukuoka)
- FSA: Kenshin Kawakami (Chunichi)

Broadcast
- Television: NTV (Game 1), TNC and Fuji TV (Game 2), CBC (Game 3, 5), Tokai TV and Fuji TV (Game 4)

The 1999 Japan Series was the championship series of Nippon Professional Baseball for the 1999 season. The 50th edition of the Series, it was a best-of-seven playoff that matched the Pacific League champion Fukuoka Daiei Hawks against the Central League champion Chunichi Dragons. The Hawks won the series in five games, giving them their first Japan Series title since 1964.

== Background ==
This was an interesting series in that neither team had reached the Japan Series in the 1990s (and in Daiei's case, they hadn't reached the Series in the '80s, either). Both teams also had long-standing championship droughts: Chunichi had not won the Series since 1954, and Daiei had not won since 1964, when they were known as the Nankai Hawks. Also heightening the drama was the managers: Hawks manager Sadaharu Oh had been a longtime star slugger with the Yomiuri Giants, and Dragons manager Senichi Hoshino, himself a former star player, was well known for his hatred of the Giants. The two would meet again in the 2003 Japan Series, this time with Hoshino managing the Hanshin Tigers.

== Fukuoka Daiei Hawks ==
The 1999 event was the first time that the Hawks had reached the Japan Series since 1973. They had made a number of free-agent acquisitions and also conducted good drafts over the years, with many of the free agents coming from the Seibu Lions. Koji Akiyama and Kimiyasu Kudoh were two such acquisitions from Seibu. Youth was also on the Hawks' side as they had many home-grown stars like Hiroki Kokubo (.234, 24 HR, 77 RBI), Nobuhiko Matsunaka (.268, 23 HR, 71 RBI), and Kenji Johjima (.306, 17 HR, 77 RBI). Rodney Pedraza was the team's closer, and the first-year foreigner recorded 27 saves to set a team record.

== Chunichi Dragons ==
This was the first Japan Series appearance for the Dragons since 1988. Young star Kenshin Kawakami was just breaking onto the scene in 1999, and he was part of a starting rotation that also had lefty screwballer Masahiro Yamamoto. Kazuyoshi Tatsunami and Takeshi Yamasaki led the team with their hitting prowess, and Korean stars Lee Jong-Beom and Sun Dong-Yeol anchored the team's baserunning and bullpen, respectively. Lee stole over 50 bases and Sun recorded 28 saves.

== Summary ==
Game	Score	Date	Location	Attendance
1	Hawks – 3, Dragons – 0	October 23	Fukuoka Dome	36,199
2	Hawks – 2, Dragons – 8	October 24	Fukuoka Dome	36,305
3	Dragons – 0, Hawks – 5	October 26	Nagoya Dome	37,832
4	Dragons – 0, Hawks – 3	October 27	Nagoya Dome	37,898
5	Dragons – 4, Hawks – 6	October 28	Nagoya Dome	38,011

== Game summaries ==
=== Game 1 ===
Saturday, October 23, 1999 6:02 pm (JST) at Fukuoka Dome in Fukuoka, Fukuoka Prefecture
Team	1	2	3	4	5	6	7	8	9	R	H	E
Chunichi	0	0	0	0	0	0	0	0	0	0	6	0
Daiei	0	0	0	0	0	3	0	0	X	3	4	0
WP: Kimiyasu Kudoh (1–0) LP: Shigeki Noguchi (0–1); Home runs: CHU: none DAI: Koji Akiyama (1)

Kimiyasu Kudoh took the mound for the Hawks and asserted his dominance from the beginning of the game. He would strike out 13 batters, and scattered six hits. His counterpart, Shigeki Noguchi, did not fare as well. Noguchi walked five batters in five and 2/3 innings, and while he only gave up two hits, one of them was costly. One of the hits in question came off the bat of Daiei leadoff man Akiyama, who cranked his first home run of the series at the start of the 6th. Two walks to the dangerous Kokubo and Johjima set up Nieves, who doubled to center to bring them both home. Kudoh took it from there, as the Dragons did not record any extra-base hits and did not have any men reach third base in the game.

=== Game 2 ===
Sunday, October 24, 1999 6:15 pm (JST) at Fukuoka Dome in Fukuoka, Fukuoka Prefecture
Team	1	2	3	4	5	6	7	8	9	R	H	E
Chunichi	2	2	0	0	2	2	0	0	0	8	6	0
Daiei	1	0	0	0	0	0	0	1	0	2	4	0
WP: Kenshin Kawakami (1–0) LP: Kenichi Wakatabe (0–1); Home runs: CHU: none DAI: Koji Akiyama (2)

This game went much better for the Dragons, as they teed off on the uncharacteristically wild Daiei pitching. Five Hawks pitchers combined for a total of 10 walks. Second-year starter Kenshin Kawakami started for the Dragons and had a much better game than Noguchi did the previous day. Kawakami also got a lot of help from both his offense and Daiei starter Kenichi Wakatabe, as he was all over the place in the first inning. Wakatabe walked leadoff man Koichi Sekikawa, then recorded the first out of the game. However, it only got worse as Kosuke Fukudome and Leo Gómez both drew walks to load the bases. Kazuyoshi Tatsunami then followed it up with a towering two-run double to center to give the Dragons a 2-0 lead. Wakatabe also walked Kazuki Inoue for a total of four free passes in the first inning.

Daiei answered in the bottom of the inning quickly, as Akiyama blasted his second home run to left field, slashing the Chunichi lead in half. However, Wakatabe coughed up any opportunity that the Hawks had of getting back into the game by giving up two more runs in the second, with the walks again hurting him. This time, he got two quick outs, but a double to Mashida and Fukudome's second walk set up Gomez, who knocked in both runners and chased the Daiei starter. Wakatabe's final line was just one and 2/3 innings, with four runs earned on three hits, five walks, and one strikeout.

Masuhiro Sakumoto ended up cleaning up the mess, as he worked three and 1/3 innings, but he did not get away unscathed. He was knocked around for two runs in the 5th, as he gave up a single to Tatsunami and a double to Lee Jong-Beom before loading the bases with a walk to Kazuki Inoue. Catcher Takeshi Nakamura then came through with a two-run single to give the Dragons a 6-1 lead.

Shuji Yoshida was called upon to try to stop the tide in the 6th, but the Chunichi bats could not be cooled down. Yoshida walked Fukuno to begin the inning, then gave up doubles to Fukudome and Gomez that scored both runs he would give up in the inning, bookended by another walk, this one to Tatsunami.

Daiei would strike for one run in the 8th off a tiring Kawakami, this one off the bat of Koichiro Yoshinaga after Chihiro Hamana singled, but it was far too little, too late, as Chunichi tied the series with a dominating 8-2 win.

=== Game 3 ===
Tuesday, October 26, 1999 6:20 pm (JST) at Nagoya Dome in Nagoya, Aichi Prefecture
Team	1	2	3	4	5	6	7	8	9	R	H	E
Daiei	0	0	0	2	0	0	1	2	0	5	9	0
Chunichi	0	0	0	0	0	0	0	0	0	0	2	0
WP: Tomohiro Nagai (1–0) LP: Masa Yamamoto (0–1); Home runs: DAI: Kenji Johjima (1); CHU: none

With the series shifting back to the Nagoya Dome for Games 3 through 5, the Dragons had hoped to have some home-field advantage going as they sent veteran screwballer Masa Yamamoto to the mound against Hawks' starter Tomohiro Nagai. Again, the Hawks' pitching prevailed, posting their second shutout of the Series on Chunichi, in what was a dominating performance by the Hawks' staff.

In fact, Nagai was in the middle of a no-hitter before he was taken out after six innings. All Chunichi could muster in that span were three walks, two of them coming in the first inning (Fukudome and Gomez). In all, the Hawks would have 6 and 1/3 innings of no-hit ball before Gomez singled to left. The Dragons' best chance to score was in the 6th inning with a runner on first, but an amazing catch by Akiyama in the right field corner turned into a double play as the runner failed to tag up.

Offensively, all Daiei would need came in the 4th off the bat of Kenji Johjima. He crushed a long home run to left to give the Hawks a 2-0 lead. The Hawks would add one more in the 7th and two more in the 8th to give Pedraza all he needed to close the door. With the Hawks' 5-0 win, the Dragons needed to solve the Hawks' pitching riddle before it was too late.

=== Game 4 ===
Wednesday, October 27, 1999 6:20 pm (JST) at Nagoya Dome in Nagoya, Aichi Prefecture
Team	1	2	3	4	5	6	7	8	9	R	H	E
Daiei	0	0	2	0	0	1	0	0	0	3	8	0
Chunichi	0	0	0	0	0	0	0	0	0	0	5	0
WP: Junji Hoshino (1–0) LP: Kazuhiro Takeda (0–1) Sv: Rodney Pedraza (1); Home runs: DAI: Hiroki Kokubo (1); CHU: none

The Dragons would find no answers for the Daiei pitching for the second straight day, and for the third time in the series, Chunichi was shut out. This time it was rookie starter Junji Hoshino who did the honors for the Hawks. Over 6 and 1/3 innings, Hoshino gave up no runs on three hits, with only one walk and one strikeout. Lefty reliever Takayuki Shinohara took over, striking out two and giving up a hit in 1 and 2/3 innings, and Pedraza closed the game out in the 9th with a hit and a strikeout to his record.

Kazuhiro Takeda started for the Dragons and matched zeroes with Hoshino through the first two innings, but Akiyama once again came through for the team as he knocked in two runs, set up by an error by Takeda which put Chihiro Hamana on first and Hoshino sacrificed him to second. Akiyama once again reinforced his case for the series' Most Valuable Player by singling in Hamana for the first run of the game. After Arihito Muramatsu walked, Kokubo singled in Akiyama for a 2-0 lead. Kokubo would strike again in the 6th with a solo blast that put the Hawks up in the game 3-0.

In the three games in which Daiei had won, the Dragons had failed to score. With their backs against the wall at three games to one, the Dragons had to get something together against the Daiei pitching and fast. One thing was certain: one team's championship drought would end sooner or later. It was all a question of if it would take one more or three more games.

=== Game 5 ===
Thursday, October 28, 1999 6:20 pm (JST) at Nagoya Dome in Nagoya, Aichi Prefecture
Team	1	2	3	4	5	6	7	8	9	R	H	E
Daiei	0	0	6	0	0	0	0	0	0	6	7	2
Chunichi	1	0	1	0	0	1	1	0	0	4	8	2
WP: Shuji Yoshida (1–0) LP: Shigeki Noguchi (0–2) Sv: Rodney Pedraza (2); Home runs: DAI: none CHU: Leo Gómez (1), Takeshi Nakamura (1)

The answer would be one more game. Anxious Hawks fans were counting down the outs as the game went on at Nagoya Dome. Masahiro Sakumoto made the spot start for the Hawks as the Dragons sent Game 1 starter Noguchi to the mound. The Dragons got off to a good start in the first as Sakumoto walked in the first run of the game after two errors from Daiei, giving the Dragons their first run in 21 innings.

However, the lead would not last. Daiei's offense clicked once again in the third, this time for six runs which would be the Hawks' only offensive output in this game. Yanagida led off the inning with a single, and then after a Sakumoto strikeout, Akiyama singled yet again to keep the rally going. Then, the defense fell apart for Chunichi, as did their hopes of their first Japan Series Championship since 1954. First, it was Noguchi who threw away a grounder by Muramatsu, and then Fukudome's throw missed the mark on a Nieves grounder. After Kokubo struck out, the wheels really fell off for Chunichi. Johjima doubled home another run, and after Iguchi was intentionally walked, Matsunaka doubled home two runs of his own for a 6-1 lead.

Chunichi did mount a rally, though. The bottom of the third saw Chunichi's first home run of the series, as Gomez helped to chase Sakumoto, cutting the deficit to 6-2. Nakamura halved the Daiei lead in the 6th with his first home run of the series, and an RBI double by Lee Jong-Beom pulled the Dragons ever closer at 6-4.

However, it was not enough. Pedraza worked the last 1 and 1/3 innings, striking out Lee to end the game 6-4, and the series, 4-1.

The series MVP was Koji Akiyama, who would retire three seasons later in 2002. In the series, he batted .286 with two home runs and he also made the miraculous jumping catch in Game 3.

== See also ==
- 1999 World Series
