= Melvin Nieves =

Puerto Rican baseball player (born 1971)

- Outfielder
- Born: December 28, 1971 (age 54); San Juan, Puerto Rico
- Batted: Switch Threw: Right

Professional debut
- MLB: September 1, 1992, for the Atlanta Braves
- NPB: April 13, 1999, for the Fukuoka Daiei Hawks

Last appearance
- MLB: September 14, 1998, for the Cincinnati Reds
- NPB: October 28, 2000, for the Fukuoka Daiei Hawks

MLB statistics
- Batting average: .231
- Home runs: 63
- Runs batted in: 187
- Stats at Baseball Reference

Teams
- Atlanta Braves (1992); San Diego Padres (1993–1995); Detroit Tigers (1996–1997); Cincinnati Reds (1998); Fukuoka Daiei Hawks (1999–2000)

Melvin Nieves Ramos (born December 28, 1971) is a Puerto Rican former professional baseball outfielder. He played all or part of seven seasons in Major League Baseball from 1992 until 1998, and two seasons in Nippon Professional Baseball in 1999–2000. Listed at 6'2", 210 lb., he was a switch-hitter and threw right-handed.

== Early life ==
Nieves attended Luis Pales Matos High School in Santa Rosa, Puerto Rico before being signed by the Atlanta Braves in 1988.

== Professional career ==
=== Atlanta Braves ===
Nieves started his professional career fairly poorly. In 56 games with the Gulf Coast League Braves in 1988, he batting average was .170. He was only 16 years old at that time.

His time with the Pulaski Braves in 1989 was a great improvement. He played 64 games with them that year, hitting .277 with nine home runs and 64 RBI. He continued his improvement in 1990, hitting .283 with nine home runs and 59 RBI in 126 games with the Sumter Braves. His 10 stolen bases is a professional career high that he would match only once more in his career.

In 1991 with the Durham Bulls, he hit only .264-but he remained consistent in the home run category, again hitting nine home runs.

He did very well in 1992, hitting a combined 26 home runs between the Bulls and Greenville Braves. This prompted his promotion to the Majors, and he made his debut on September 1 of that year with the Braves. At the age of 20, he was the youngest player to don a big league uniform that season. His first stint in the majors was less than impressive-in 19 at-bats, he hit only .211. He collected his first big league hit off of Anthony Young of the New York Mets in his second career at-bat on September 2.

=== San Diego Padres ===
He started the 1993 season in the Braves system, hitting .278 with 10 home runs in 78 games with the Richmond Braves, before being traded with minor leaguer Vince Moore and Donnie Elliott to the San Diego Padres for Fred McGriff in July of that year. In 43 games with the Padres' AAA team, the Las Vegas Stars, he hit .308 with seven home runs. He spent 19 games in the Majors in 1993, hitting an unimpressive .191. He did hit his first career home run that season, a solo shot off pitcher Chris Hammond on September 8. He was the seventh youngest player to don a uniform in 1993. According to Baseball America, he was the 39th best prospect in 1993.

His 1994 season was perhaps the best of his professional career. In 406 at-bats with Las Vegas, he blasted 25 home runs and drove in 92 runs, all the while hitting .308. A poor eye at the plate led him to 138 strikeouts, though. That earned him a promotion to the majors, where he for once was somewhat impressive-in 19 at-bats with the Padres, he hit .263. He spent all of 1995 with the Padres. In 234 at-bats, he hit only .205 with 88 strikeouts. His 14 home runs were overshadowed by the large number of whiffs. He hit the only two grand slams of his career in 1995-the first off Terry Mulholland on August 2 and the second off Doug Henry on August 26. Baseball America ranked him the 69th best prospect in 1994.

On March 22, 1996, just before the beginning of the season, Nieves was traded with Raul Casanova and Richie Lewis to the Detroit Tigers for Sean Bergman, Todd Steverson and Cade Gaspar, a minor leaguer.

=== Detroit Tigers ===
His 1996 season was the best of his career. He played in 120 games with Detroit that season, hitting 24 home runs and driving in 60 RBI. His batting average was only .246, though, and he struck out 158 times in 431 at-bats. Perhaps the most memorable game of his 1996 season was on April 6-against the Oakland Athletics, he collected two doubles, a triple and a home run. Twice in 1996 he also accomplished the rare feat of hitting home runs from both sides of the plate in a game. The first time he did it was against the Milwaukee Brewers on July 15-he victimized pitchers Ricky Bones and Mike Potts in that game. The next time he did it was on August 20 against the Chicago White Sox. In that game, he victimized pitchers Kevin Tapani and Rich Sauveur. Oddly, those were the only two games in his career in which he hit two or more home runs.

Although he hit 20 home runs in 1997 for Detroit, his batting average again was subpar at .228, and he struck out 157 times in 359 at-bats. His 158 strikeouts in 1996 and 157 strikeouts in 1997 were second most by a batter each year, trailing only Jay Buhner each year.

=== Cincinnati Reds ===
On November 11, 1997, he was traded from the Tigers to the Cincinnati Reds for Paul Bako and Donne Wall. Although he played 15 games and hit .283 in the minors with the Indianapolis Indians in 1998, he spent most of the season as a bench player, getting 119 at-bats in 83 games. He hit .252 in that time. That would be the last of the majors he would see, playing his final game on September 14 of that year.

=== Minor leagues and overseas ===
In 1999, Nieves signed with the NPB's Fukuoka Daiei Hawks. From that point on, he played affiliated, foreign and independent baseball. In addition to Japan, Nieves has spent time in Mexico, the Atlantic League, and the Northern League, just to name a few locations. Most recently, he spent 2008 with the Vaqueros Laguna of the Mexican League.

== Career overview ==
Overall, he hit .231 with 63 home runs and 187 RBI in the majors. He played in 458 games, collected 284 hits, walked 136 times and struck out 483 times. The numbers he wore in his career were 7 (1992), 10 (1993), 3 (1994–1995), 30 (1996–1997) and 46 (1998).

== Personal life ==
Melvin is the nephew of José Morales.
