= Sean Bergman =

American baseball player (born 1970)

- Pitcher
- Born: April 11, 1970 (age 56); Joliet, Illinois, U.S.
- Batted: Right Threw: Right

Professional debut
- MLB: July 7, 1993, for the Detroit Tigers
- NPB: May 27, 2001, for the Kintetsu Buffaloes

Last appearance
- MLB: June 17, 2000, for the Minnesota Twins
- NPB: August 26, 2002, for the Kintetsu Buffaloes

MLB statistics
- Win–loss record: 39–47
- Earned run average: 5.28
- Strikeouts: 455

NPB statistics
- Win–loss record: 14–10
- Earned run average: 4.62
- Strikeouts: 116
- Stats at Baseball Reference

Teams
- Detroit Tigers (1993–1995); San Diego Padres (1996–1997); Houston Astros (1998–1999); Atlanta Braves (1999); Minnesota Twins (2000); Kintetsu Buffaloes (2001–2002)

Sean Frederick Bergman (born April 11, 1970) is an American former right-handed Major League Baseball (MLB) pitcher who played for the Detroit Tigers, San Diego Padres, Houston Astros, Atlanta Braves, and Minnesota Twins between 1993 and 2000. Bergman attended Joliet Catholic High School in Joliet, Illinois, before attending Southern Illinois University.

Standing at 6'4", 205 pounds, Bergman was originally drafted by the Tigers 115th overall in the 1991 Major League Baseball draft.

He spent his first professional season, 1991, with the Niagara Falls Rapids of the New York–Penn League. In 15 games with them, he went five and seven with a 4.46 earned run average (ERA). A starting pitcher, he struck out 77 batters in just over 84 innings of work.

He started the 1992 season with the Lakeland Tigers, going five and two with them, with a 2.49 ERA. He finished his second professional season with a nine and nine record, posting a 3.41 ERA. This is because after his promotion to the London Tigers, he went only four and seven with a 4.28 ERA.

Although his 1993 minor league season was statistically lackluster (eight and nine with a 4.38 ERA), he still must have impressed the big-league Tigers enough to earn a promotion. He made his major league debut on July 7 of that year against the Minnesota Twins. Overall, he went 1–4 in nine games with the Tigers in 1993. He walked 23 and struck out 19 in 39 2/3 innings. One notable achievement though is that he pitched a complete game in the first start of his career.

He spent most of 1994 with the Toledo Mud Hens, posting an 11–8 record. He started three games in the majors, going 2–1. Bergman spent the majority of the 1995 season in the majors. In 28 games started, he posted a 7–10 record with a 5.12 ERA. His 13 wild pitches were second in the league, trailing only Al Leiter's 14. He did pitch one shutout, which put him ninth in the league.

Right before the 1996 season, he was traded by the Tigers with Cade Gaspar and Todd Steverson to the San Diego Padres for Raul Casanova, Richie Lewis, and Melvin Nieves.

He spent two seasons with the Padres, posting a combined record of 8–12 with an ERA of 5.17. After the 1997 season, he was traded from the Padres to the Houston Astros for James Mouton. 1998 was perhaps Bergman's best season—he posted a record of 12–9 with a 3.72 ERA. He walked only 42 batters in 172 innings of work. In 1998, he gave up home runs to both Sammy Sosa and Mark McGwire as they both chased Roger Maris' single-season home run record.

He started 1999 with the Astros, but after posting a 4–6 record with a 5.36 ERA for the Astros to start the season, he was released and signed with the Atlanta Braves. He appeared in relief in six games with the Braves, posting a solid 2.84 ERA.

Selected off waivers by the Twins after the 1999 season, he was brought in to try to aid a team who had a struggling starting rotation. He did not make it any better. He started 14 games for them, posted a 9.66 ERA, and by late June, was released. His big league career ended on June 17, 2000, but his pro career did not. He bounced around the minors until 2004, even playing in Japan in 2002.

Overall, he went 39–47 with a 5.28 ERA in 196 games. He walked 272 batters and struck out 455 in 750 1/3 innings of work.

Bergman once was the pitching coach at the NCAA Division II level, coaching the Findlay team.

He currently lives near Bryan, Ohio and has five children. He teaches physical education at Hicksville Elementary School in Hicksville, Ohio. He is also a high school girls golf coach.
