= Takeshi Nakamura =

Japanese baseball player (born 1967)

Takeshi Nakamura 中村 武志
- Catcher/Battery coach
- Born: March 17, 1967 (age 59); Ukyo-ku, Kyoto, Japan
- Batted: Right Threw: Right

NPB debut
- April 14, 1987, for the Chunichi Dragons

Last NPB appearance
- 27 September, 2005, for the Tohoku Rakuten Golden Eagles

NPB statistics (through 2005)
- Games Played: 1,955
- Batting average: .242
- Home runs: 137
- RBI: 604
- Stats at Baseball Reference

Teams
- As player: Chunichi Dragons (1985–2001); Yokohama Baystars (2002–2004); Tohoku Rakuten Golden Eagles (2005); As Coach: Yokohama Baystars (2006–2008); Chunichi Dragons (2009–2012); Chiba Lotte Marines (2013–2014); Kia Tigers (2015–2018); Chunichi Dragons (2019–2021)

Career highlights and awards
- 2× Most Valuable Battery Award (1993 with Masahiro Yamamoto, 1999 with Shigeki Noguchi); 8× NPB All-Star (1988-1991, 1993, 1996, 1998, 2001)

Takeshi Nakamura (中村 武志, Nakamura Takeshi; born March 17, 1967) is a Japanese former professional baseball catcher. He played for the Chunichi Dragons, Yokohama Baystars and Tohoku Rakuten Golden Eagles.

He was most recently the first team battery coach for the Chunichi Dragons in Japan's Nippon Professional Baseball.

== Career ==
Nakamura was a 1st round draft pick in 1984 for the Chunichi Dragons and manager Senichi Hoshino where he played for 16 years. He took the mantle of regular catcher from 1981 MVP Takayoshi Nakao in 1987 and passed it to 1998 Central League winning Motonobu Tanishige in 2002. Nakamura was traded to the Yokohama Baystars for cash considerations after Tanishige was brought in during free agency by then manager Hisashi Yamada. Following the establishment of the Tohoku Rakuten Golden Eagles in 2004, Nakamura was sent to the Eagles in a zero-fee trade from the Baystars where he ended his career in 2005.

Since retiring, Nakamura has coached with 3 NPB clubs, and one KBO club.

Nakamura is one of only 11 catchers in NPB history to have a .500+ success rate for throwing out runners in a single season and is one of only 4 to do it twice in 1989 and 1995.
