= Raúl Casanova =

Puerto Rican baseball player (born 1972)

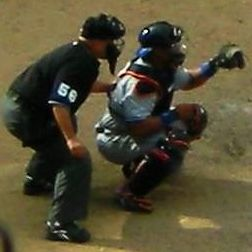
- Cassanova (right) catching for the New York Mets in 2008
- Catcher
- Born: August 23, 1972 (age 54); Humacao, Puerto Rico
- Batted: Switch Threw: Right

MLB debut
- May 24, 1996, for the Detroit Tigers

Last MLB appearance
- June 8, 2008, for the New York Mets

MLB statistics
- Batting average: .236
- Home runs: 35
- Runs batted in: 130
- Stats at Baseball Reference

Teams
- Detroit Tigers (1996–1998); Milwaukee Brewers (2000–2002); Baltimore Orioles (2002); Chicago White Sox (2005); Tampa Bay Devil Rays (2007); New York Mets (2008)

Raúl Casanova (born August 23, 1972) is a Puerto Rican former Major League Baseball catcher who played recurrently from 1996 to 2008.

== Early life ==
Casanova attended Ponce High School in Puerto Rico.

== Baseball career ==
=== Minor leagues ===
He was drafted 220th overall, in the eighth round of the 1990 draft by the New York Mets.

His professional career started off that year. In 65 at bats, he collected only five hits for a .077 batting average. In his 1991 season he had 18 at-bats with the Kingsport Mets, he collected one hit for a .056 batting average. In 32 games with the Gulf Coast League Mets that year, he hit .243.

His 1992 season was an improvement; in 137 at-bats with Kingsport that year, not only did he hit his first professional home run, but he also hit .270. He hit only .167 in 18 at bats with the Columbia Mets that year though.

After the 1992 season, he was traded with Wally Whitehurst and D. J. Dozier to the San Diego Padres for Tony Fernández.

He spent the whole of 1993 with the Waterloo Diamonds, and he hit .256 with six home runs in 76 games.

Then, in 1994, he had the best season of his professional career. Playing for the Rancho Cucamonga Quakes, his batting average rose to .340, and he also hit 23 home runs and had 120 runs batted in (RBIs). Because of his outstanding performance, he was named the Padres Minor League Player of the Year. He was also a California League All-Star.

You build ballclubs around guys like him (Raul Casanova). In my mind, he has made himself the top prospect in the organization. He's a switch-hitting catcher with power.

— Tim Flannery in Baseball Digest (1995)

In 1995, Casanova saw his average drop to .271, but he did hit 12 home runs while with the Memphis Chicks. He was playing in Double-A baseball, higher than he had ever played before. According to Baseball America, he was the 60th best prospect in 1995.

After the 1995 season, he was traded with Richie Lewis and Melvin Nieves to the Detroit Tigers for Sean Bergman, Todd Steverson and minor leaguer Cade Gaspar.

He started 1996 off strong, hitting .333 in 30 at bats with the Jacksonville Suns. That prompted his promotion to Triple-A, where he hit .273 in 49 games.

=== Major leagues ===
He made his major league debut on May 24 of that year at the age of 23, going 0-for-4 in his debut game. He collected his first hit on May 27 off pitcher Tim Belcher of the Kansas City Royals. Two days later in his very next game, he hit his first career home run, a solo shot off Kevin Appier. Overall, he played 25 games for the Tigers that year, hitting .188 with four home runs and nine RBIs. In 1996, he hit home runs from both sides of the plate in one game.

He was the team's main starting catcher in 1997, although Matt Walbeck also got a fairly large amount of playing time. In 101 games with Detroit that year, he hit .243 with five home runs and 24 RBIs. Of all the players on the team who appeared in over 100 games, he was the only one not to collect 40 or more RBIs. He also spent some time in the minors, hitting .195 in 12 games with the Toledo Mud Hens.

He started 1998 as the team's starting catcher, but after collecting only two hits in his first 13 games, he was sent down to Toledo. In 50 games with Toledo that year, he hit .257. He was recalled to the Majors in July of that year, but only played three more games in the big leagues. Overall, he hit only .143 in 16 games with the Tigers that year.

He spent all of 1999 in the minor leagues, playing as low as Rookie League baseball. In two games with the GCL Tigers that year, he collected four hits (including a home run) in five at-bats. In 12 at-bats with Single-A Advanced Lakeland, he hit .500, hitting another home run. He really struggled while with Triple-A Toledo-he spent 44 games with them and hit only .206.

He was granted free agency after the 1999 season and was signed by the Colorado Rockies. He was released by them before the beginning of the season and was then picked up by the Milwaukee Brewers. Casanova, Henry Blanco and Tyler Houston all spent time catching for the Brewers in 2000. He hit .247 with six home runs (including two grand slams) and 36 RBIs for the Brewers that year. He also hit .288 in 20 games with the Indianapolis Indians that season.

He was the team's main backup catcher in 2001, backing up Blanco. He had a career year that year, belting a career high 11 home runs and hitting a career high .260 in 71 games. Also, for the first time in his career, he did not spend any time in the minors that season.

2002 was a bad season for Casanova. He started off with the Brewers, but after hitting only .184 in 31 games with them he was released and quickly signed by the Baltimore Orioles. He only played two games with them that year, collecting no hits in one at bat. Overall, he hit .182 that year, with one home run and eight RBIs. He spent 14 games with Indianapolis that year as well-he hit .279 with them.

He played in five different farm systems between 2003 and 2005, playing well. He played for the Colorado Springs Sky Sox and Ottawa Lynx in 2003, hitting .301 while with the Sky Sox, who are in the Colorado Rockies farm system, and .286 with the Lynx, who are in the Orioles farm system.

Signed as a free agent by the Boston Red Sox in 2004, he hit .270 in 23 games with their Triple-A team, the Pawtucket Red Sox before being sent to the Kansas City Royals as part of a conditional deal. In 58 games with their Triple-A team, the Omaha Royals, he hit .323 with 10 home runs.

Even after a great performance in their system, Casanova was released by the Royals and then signed by the Chicago White Sox. He spent 70 games with their Triple-A team, the Charlotte Knights, before getting called up to the Majors in the latter part of the season. In six games with the White Sox that year, he collected one hit in five at-bats.

He was granted free agency after the 2005 season and was signed by the Oakland Athletics. He played in a total of eight minor league games in 2006, hitting .265 in 34 at-bats. He spent time with three teams in 2006 – he played two games with the Stockton Ports, two games with the Midland RockHounds and four games with the Sacramento River Cats.

He was a non-roster invitee to spring training in 2007 for the Tampa Bay Devil Rays. He was assigned to the Triple-A Durham Bulls. In June 2007, Casanova was called up to back up Dioner Navarro in the major leagues. In 29 big league games in 2007, Casanova hit .253 with six home runs and 11 RBIs. His slugging percentage was .519. In 44 games with the Bulls, he hit .291 with five home runs and 21 RBIs. On December 12, 2007, Casanova signed a minor league contract with the New York Mets.

On April 27, 2008, Casanova hit his first home run as a New York Mets player. Batting left-handed, he hit the home run to right-center field at Shea Stadium against Atlanta Braves pitcher John Smoltz.

Casanova was placed on the bereavement list on June 4, 2008, after the death of his father. After returning to the team a few days later, he was designated for assignment on June 10. He became a free agent at the end of the season.

== See also ==
- List of Major League Baseball players from Puerto Rico
