= Akira Eto =

Japanese baseball player

- Infielder/Coach
- Born: April 15, 1970 (age 56); Higashiyamato, Tokyo, Japan
- Batted: Right Threw: Right

debut
- April 7, 1990, for the Hiroshima Toyo Carp

Last appearance
- August 4, 2009, for the Saitama Seibu Lions

Career statistics
- Batting average: .268
- Home runs: 364
- Runs batted in: 1,020
- Stats at Baseball Reference

Teams
- As player: Hiroshima Toyo Carp (1990–1999); Yomiuri Giants (2000–2005); Seibu Lions / Saitama Seibu Lions (2006–2009); As coach: Yomiuri Giants (2010–2018)

Career highlights and awards
- 6× NPB All-Star (1993, 1995, 1996, 1998, 1999, 2001); 3× Japan Series champion (2000, 2002, 2008); 2× Central League Leader of Home Run (1993, 1995); 1× Central League Leader of RBI (1995); 7× Central League Best Nine Award (1993 - 1996, 1998, 2000, 2001); 1× Central League Golden Glove Award (1996)

Akira Eto (江藤 智, Etō Akira; born April 15, 1970) is a Japanese former professional baseball third baseman in Nippon Professional Baseball. He played for the Hiroshima Toyo Carp from 1990 to 1999, Yomiuri Giants from 2000 to 2005 and the Seibu Lions / Saitama Seibu Lions from 2006 to 2009.

== See also ==
- List of top Nippon Professional Baseball home run hitters
- List of Nippon Professional Baseball players with 1,000 runs batted in
