= Kazuhiro Takeda =

Japanese baseball player

- Pitcher
- Born: June 22, 1965 (age 60)
- Batted: Left Threw: Right

NPB debut
- June 8, 1988, for the Nippon-Ham Fighters

Last appearance
- October 10, 2002, for the Yomiuri Giants

NPB statistics
- Win–loss record: 89-99
- ERA: 3.92
- Strikeouts: 1,008
- Saves: 31
- Stats at Baseball Reference

Teams
- Nippon-Ham Fighters (1988–1995); Fukuoka Daiei Hawks (1996–1998); Chunichi Dragons (1999–2001); Yomiuri Giants (2002)

Kazuhiro Takeda (武田 一浩, Takeda Kazuhiro; born June 22, 1965) is a Japanese former professional baseball player.

He played the first half of his career for the Nippon-Ham Fighters in Japan's Nippon Professional Baseball. He was also the pitching coach for the Japan national baseball team at the 2006 World Baseball Classic.
