= Todd Steverson =

American baseball player and coach (born 1971)

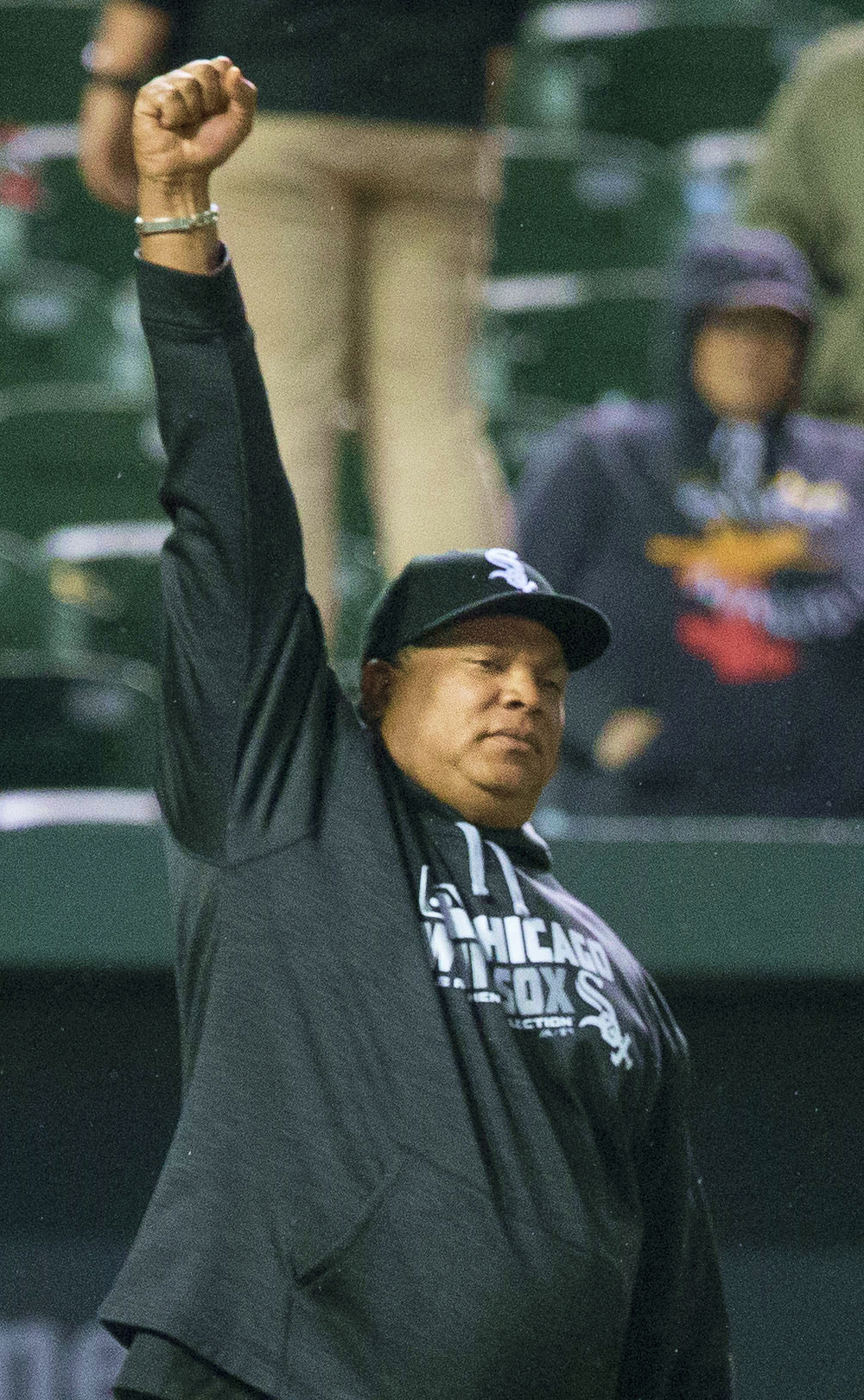
- Steverson as a coach for the Chicago White Sox in 2016
- Outfielder
- Born: November 15, 1971 (age 55); Los Angeles, California, U.S.
- Batted: Right Threw: Right

MLB debut
- April 28, 1995, for the Detroit Tigers

Last MLB appearance
- April 3, 1996, for the San Diego Padres

MLB statistics
- Batting average: .256
- Home runs: 2
- Runs batted in: 6
- Stats at Baseball Reference

Teams
- Detroit Tigers (1995); San Diego Padres (1996); As Coach: Oakland Athletics (2009–2010); Chicago White Sox (2014–2019)

Todd Anthony Steverson (born November 15, 1971) is an American professional baseball coach, and a former left and right fielder. He played for the Detroit Tigers and San Diego Padres and coached for the Oakland Athletics and Chicago White Sox, all in Major League Baseball. As a player, Steverson threw and batted right-handed, stood 6 feet 2 inches (1.88 m) tall and weighed 194 pounds (88 kg).

== College and minor league playing career ==
Steverson was born in Los Angeles, California, and attended Culver City High School. The cousin of Tigers outfielder Ron LeFlore, Steverson played for the Sun Devils while attending Arizona State University. Originally selected by the St. Louis Cardinals in the sixth round of the 1989 draft, Steverson opted not to sign. In 1991, he played collegiate summer baseball with the Chatham A's of the Cape Cod Baseball League. He was drafted again as the 25th overall pick by the Toronto Blue Jays in the 1992 MLB draft, and this time he did sign. His signing bonus was $450,000.

He spent three years in the Blue Jays' farm system, showing nothing more than mediocre statistics: he was speedy (he had a career high 23 stolen bases in 1992 while with the St. Catharines Blue Jays), but he also struck out a lot (118 times in 413 at bats in 1993 with the Dunedin Blue Jays) and was not an average hitter (.209 batting average in 1992).

He was drafted by the Tigers in the 1994 Rule 5 Draft, and although he had had a fairly unimpressive minor league career, he found himself with the big league club before the end of April 1995.

== Major league career ==
He made his debut on April 28, 1995 at the age of 23 against the Seattle Mariners. In his only at bat of the game, he hit a fly ball out to right field off of a pitch from Ron Villone. He appeared in 30 games for the Tigers in 1995, collecting 11 hits in 42 at bats for a .262 batting average. He spent nine games in the minors that year, but he hit only .107.

Steverson hit only two home runs in 1995, but they came in back-to-back games. He victimized pitcher Eddie Guardado of the Minnesota Twins on June 10, then pitcher Dave Stevens of the Twins the very next day. The top game of his season may have come on June 15 of that year, though. Playing the New York Yankees, he collected three hits in four at bats, driving in two runs and scoring once. Those were the last hits of his career.

Although his rookie season was short but fairly impressive, the Tigers did not keep him for more than a season. Instead, right before the beginning 1996 season, he was traded by the Tigers with Cade Gaspar and Sean Bergman to the Padres for Raul Casanova, Richie Lewis and Melvin Nieves. That would basically seal the fate for his big league career-it ended on April 3 of that year. Pinch hitting for pitcher Joey Hamilton, he was called out on strikes in his final big league at bat. Turk Wendell was credited with the strikeout.

== Coaching and managerial career ==
He continued playing in the minor leagues until 1998. After his playing days ended, he became a minor league baseball coach and manager. He coached the Potomac Cannons in 1999, 2001 and 2002. He coached the Peoria Chiefs in 2000, the Palm Beach Cardinals in 2003 and the Vancouver Canadians in 2004. He managed the Stockton Ports in 2005 and 2006. He was set to manage the Midland RockHounds in 2007. He was the manager of the Triple-A Sacramento River Cats in 2008. He was hired in December 2008 to be the Oakland Athletics first base coach.

Steverson received a one-year suspension for his actions in a June 23, 2012 game. While serving as acting manager for the Modesto Nuts, he ordered his pitcher to intentionally balk, allowing the winning run to score in the 18th inning of a game against the Stockton Ports. He explained his decision, saying: "We had a position player out there and I didn’t want to put another position player on the mound and get him hurt … I didn’t get any of my pitchers hurt and I didn’t get any position players hurt."

After Steverson's two seasons on the MLB Oakland staff (2009–2010), he returned to minor league baseball and the Athletics' farm system as the hitting coach for the River Cats (2011) and then as the organization's roving minor league hitting instructor (2012–2013).

On October 25, 2013, the White Sox announced that they had hired Steverson as their new hitting coach, replacing Jeff Manto. Steverson was relieved of his position in October 2019. As of 2020, Steverson is the hitting coach for the Las Vegas Aviators, the Triple-A affiliate of the Oakland Athletics.

Preceded by Jeff Manto	Chicago White Sox hitting coach 2014-2019	Succeeded by Frank Menechino
Preceded by Tye Waller	Oakland Athletics first-base coach 2009–2010	Succeeded by Tye Waller
Preceded by Tony DeFrancesco	Sacramento River Cats manager 2008	Succeeded by Tony DeFrancesco
Preceded by Von Hayes	Midland RockHounds manager 2007	Succeeded by Webster Garrison
