= Chihiro Hamana =

Japanese baseball player (born 1969)

- Infielder
- Born: November 11, 1969; Mukō, Kyoto, Japan
- Batted: Left Threw: Right

NPB debut
- April 5, 1990, for the Fukuoka Daiei Hawks

Last appearance
- July 19, 2004, for the Chiba Lotte Marines

NPB statistics (through 2004)
- Batting average: .245
- Hits: 811
- Home runs: 32
- Runs batted in: 271
- Stolen base: 112

Teams
- Fukuoka Daiei Hawks (1992–2001); Yakult Swallows (2002–2003); Chiba Lotte Marines (2004)

Career highlights and awards
- 3× NPB All-Star (1992, 1995, 1996)
Medals
Men's baseball
Representing Japan
Goodwill Games
Silver medal – second place	1990 Seattle	Team

Chihiro Hamana (浜名 千広, Hamana Chihiro; born November 11, 1969) is a Japanese former Nippon Professional Baseball infielder.
