= Kenichi Wakatabe =

Japanese baseball player & coach (born 1969)

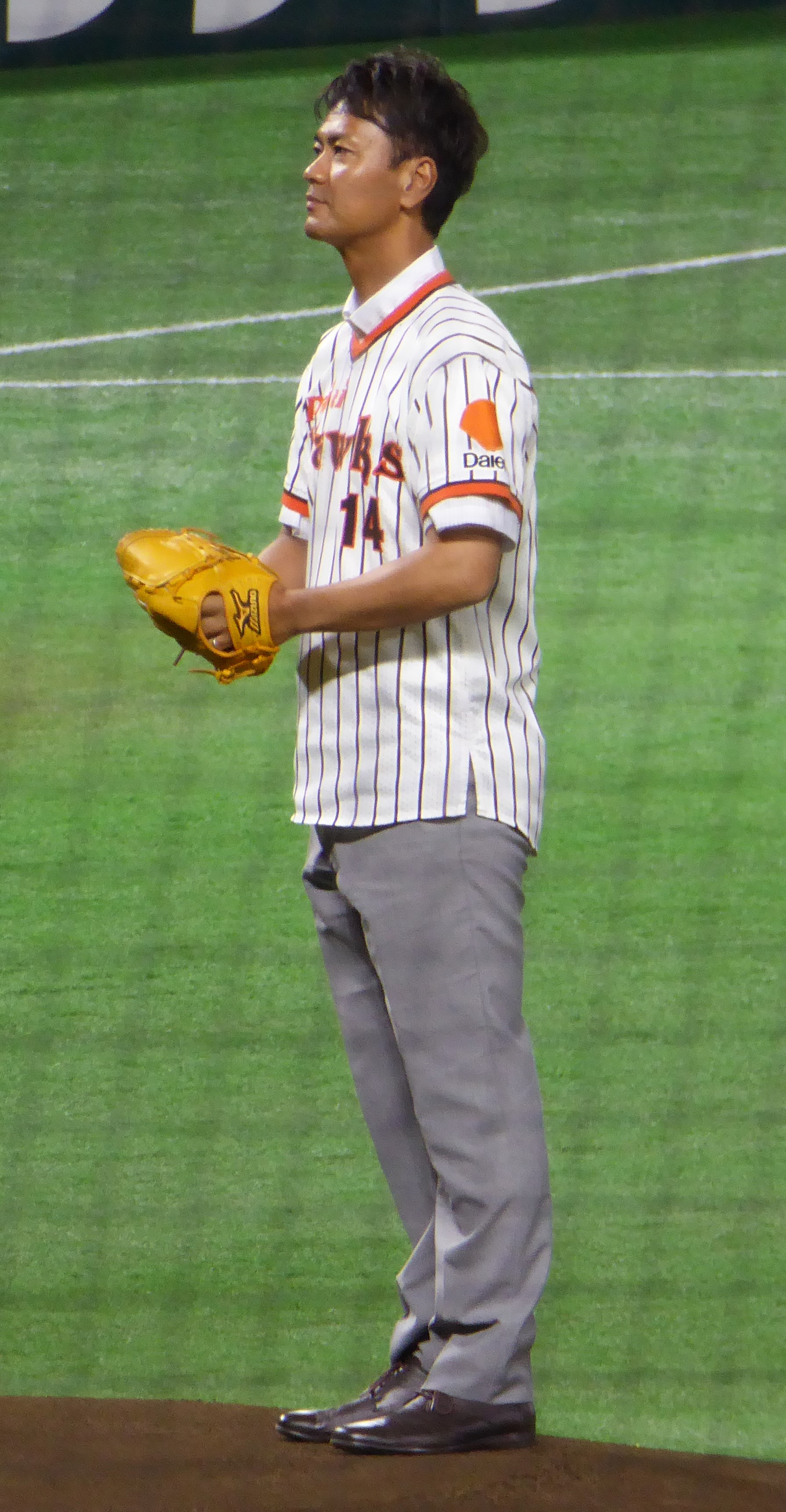

Fukuoka SoftBank Hawks – No. 72
- Pitcher / Coach
- Born: August 5, 1969 (age 57); Kamakura, Kanagawa, Japan
- Batted: Right Threw: Right

NPB debut
- April 9, 1992, for the Fukuoka Daiei Hawks

Last NPB appearance
- October 11, 2004, for the Yokohama BayStars

NPB statistics
- Win–loss record: 71–75
- Earned run average: 4.15
- Strikeouts: 761
- Stats at Baseball Reference

Teams
- As player: Fukuoka Daiei Hawks (1992–2002); Yokohama BayStars (2003–2005); As coach: Fukuoka SoftBank Hawks (2017–present)

Career highlights and awards
- As player: Pacific League Outstanding Rookie of the Year Award (1992); NPB All-Star (2002); Japan Series champion (1999); As coach: Japan Series champion (2025)
- Last updated on: 10 December 2023

Kenichi Wakatabe (若田部 健一, Wakatabe Kenichi; born August 5, 1969) is a Japanese former professional baseball pitcher, and current first squad pitching coach for the Fukuoka SoftBank Hawks of Nippon Professional Baseball (NPB). He played in NPB for the Hawks and Yokohama BayStars.

Haruka Wakatabe, his daughter, is a former member of the female idol group HKT48.

== Early baseball career ==
Wakatabe went on to Komazawa University, where he played in the Tohto University Baseball League.

He won the Best Pitcher Award and the Best Nine Award in the 1990 Fall League and won the Most Valuable Player Award and a second Best Pitcher Award and the Best Nine Award in the 1991 Fall League. He pitched in a total of 48 games in the Collegiate League, recorded 20-10 Win–loss record, a 1.76 ERA and 223 strikeouts. And He was selected to the Japan national baseball team for the 1991 IBAF Intercontinental Cup.

== Professional career ==
=== Active player era ===
On November 22, 1991, Wakatebe was the first pick in the 1991 Nippon Professional Baseball draft, competing with the Fukuoka Daiei Hawks, Yomiuri Giants, Hiroshima Toyo Carp, and Seibu Lions, with the Fukuoka Daiei Hawks winning the right to negotiate. He also signed a contract for 130 million yen and an annual salary of 12 million yen, the highest of any rookie player at the time.

In 1992 season, he finished the regular season with a 10-13 Win–loss record, a 4.00 ERA, and a 13 complete games in 27 game pitched as a starting pitcher despite being a rookie player, and on October 1, 1992, he pitched his last game at Heiwadai Stadium against the Kintetsu Buffaloes, throwing against Buffaloes starting pitcher Hideo Nomo to record a one-hit shutout victory.

He also recorded 10 wins in the 1994 season, but has since suffered a slump. But he recovered in 1999, winning 10 games as a starting rotation pitcher and helping the Fukuoka Daiei Hawks to their first championship.

In 2000 season, he was the team's top winner with nine victories, helping his team win its second straight league championship. Wakatabe was a close friend of Masao Fujii, and on October 7, the game that decided the league championship against the Orix Blue Wave, he joined the team in celebrating the victory, holding up a stuffed Harry Hawk, the team mascot, wearing Fujii's uniform number 15, for Fujii, who was fighting an illness. Six days later, Fujii died.

On October 21, 2000 Wakatabe pitched the first game of the 2000 Japan Series along with Kimiyasu Kudo, who had moved from the Hawks to the Yomiuri Giants the previous year. They pitched with the bones of the deceased Fujii tucked into their uniforms.

He won only six games in the 2001 season, but again in the 2002 season he won 10 games and was named an All-Star, pitched in the Sanyo All-Star Game 2002.

He joined the Yokohama BayStars in the 2003 season and played three seasons before retiring.

Wakatabe pitched in 271 games in 14 seasons overall, compiling a 71-75 Win-loss record and a 4.15 ERA.

=== After retirement ===
Since his retirement, Wakatabe has worked as a baseball commentator; in 2015, he served as pitching coach for the Japan national baseball team and was named second squad pitching coach for the Fukuoka Softbank Hawks in the 2017 season.

He is the first squad pitching coach for the 2018 season, the second squad pitching coach again for 2019, and the third squad pitching coach beginning with the 2020 season.

On December 2, 2023, he was transferred to the first squad pitching coach.
