= Tomohiro Nagai =

Japanese baseball player

Fukuoka SoftBank Hawks
- Pitcher / Executive officer
- Born: August 11, 1975 (age 50); Akashi, Hyōgo, Japan
- Batted: Left Threw: Right

NPB debut
- June 13, 1998, for the Fukuoka Daiei Hawks

Last appearance
- July 27, 2003, for the Fukuoka Daiei Hawks

NPB statistics (through 2005 season)
- Win–loss record: 28-21
- ERA: 4.67
- Strikeouts: 339

Teams
- As player: Fukuoka Daiei Hawks/Fukuoka SoftBank Hawks (1998–2005); As front office officer: Fukuoka SoftBank Hawks (2007–present)

Career highlights and awards
- 1× 1999 Japan Series Outstanding Player Award; 1× Japan Series champion (1999)

Tomohiro Nagai (永井 智浩, Nagai Tomohiro; born August 11, 1975) is a Japanese former professional baseball pitcher, and current Executive officer (General Manager of Organization and Training division) and General Manager of Scouting department for the Fukuoka SoftBank Hawks of Nippon Professional Baseball (NPB).

He previously played for the Fukuoka Daiei Hawks.

His nephew is Ryuta Heinai, who currently plays for the Yomiuri Giants.

== Professional career ==
=== Active player era ===
On November 21, 1997, Nagai was drafted first overall by the Fukuoka Daiei Hawks in the 1997 Nippon Professional Baseball draft.

In 1998 season, he made his Pacific League debut and pitched in seven games.

In 1999 season, He and Junji Hoshino, who was drafted the same year, won 10 games and contributed the Fukuoka Daiei Hawks win their first Pacific League championship. In the 1999 Japan Series, Nagai started Game 3 and won without allowing a run in 6 innings. For this performance, he received the Japan Series Outstanding Player Award.

Nagai pitched in 96 games in 8 seasons overall, compiling a 28-21 win–loss record and a 4.67 ERA.

He retired during the 2006 season.

=== After retirement ===
After his retirement, Nagai has worked as a front-office officer for the Fukuoka SoftBank Hawks since 2007 and was appointed assistant deputy general manager of the team's general headquarters in January 2017. On December 1, he became the general manager of the team headquarters division, organizing and development department and the head of the development department scouting office.

On December 1, 2018, he was appointed general manager of the organization and development division of the team's general headquarters and general manager of the scouting and development department.

On June 1, 2021, Nagai was appointed to the position of Executive Officer in addition to his current position.
