= Donnie Elliott =

American baseball player (born 1968)

- Pitcher
- Born: September 20, 1968 (age 57); Pasadena, Texas, U.S.
- Batted: Right Threw: Right

MLB debut
- April 23, 1994, for the San Diego Padres

Last MLB appearance
- September 19, 1995, for the San Diego Padres

MLB statistics
- Win–loss record: 0–1
- Earned run average: 3.09
- Strikeouts: 27
- Stats at Baseball Reference

Teams
- San Diego Padres (1994–1995)

Donald Glenn Elliott (born September 20, 1968) is an American former right-handed Major League Baseball relief pitcher who played from 1994 to 1995 for the San Diego Padres. He is 6 ft 4 in (1.93 m) and weighed 190 pounds at the time.

== Philadelphia Phillies ==
Prior to being drafted by the Philadelphia Phillies in the seventh round of the 1987 draft, Elliott attended Deer Park High School and then San Jacinto College. He began his professional career in 1988, as a starting pitcher. Pitching for the Martinsville Phillies, he went 4–2 with a 3.66 ERA, striking out 77 batters in 59 innings pitched that season.

In 1989, he pitched for the Batavia Clippers and Spartanburg Phillies, going a combined 6–4 with a 1.88. Splitting the 1991 season between the Spartanburg Phillies and Clearwater Phillies, Elliott went a combined 11–9 with a 3.25 ERA. In a June game against the Sumpter Flyers Elliott struck out a franchise record 17 in 7 2/3 innings. The 17 strikeouts were a Spartanburg franchise record and the most of any minor league pitcher in 1991. On December 9, he was drafted by the Seattle Mariners in the Rule 5 draft, however he was returned to the Phillies on April 1, 1992.

== Major league season ==
On May 28, 1992, he was traded to the Atlanta Braves for Ben Rivera. In 103 2/3 innings with the Greenville Braves, he went 7–2 with a 2.08 ERA. Ranked the ninth best prospect in the Braves organization by Baseball America prior to the 1993 season, he began the year with the Richmond Braves, going 8–5 with a 4.72 ERA with them. Twice he came within 4 outs of a no hitter. Once against the Toledo Mud Hens and then again against the Scranton Red Barons. On July 18, his was traded to the Padres with Melvin Nieves and minor leaguer Vince Moore for Fred McGriff. He spent the rest of the year with the Las Vegas Stars, going 2–5 with a 6.37 ERA. In an August start against the Phoenix Firebirds he again flirted with a no hitter, having not given up a hit for the first 8 1/3. He finished the game with a franchise record 14 strikeouts. Overall,. he went 10–10 with a 5.19 ERA.

April 23, 1994 marked the date of Elliott's major league debut. It would end up being his only big league start. Coincidentally, the opposing team he was facing was the team that originally drafted him, the Phillies. Even more coincidentally, he was facing the pitcher he was traded for on May 28, 1992, Ben Rivera. Neither pitcher fared very well in that game, with Elliott lasting only 2 2/3 innings, giving up two earned runs, four hits and two walks. Rivera lasted four innings, allowing seven hits, five earned runs and four walks. In the end, the Padres won the game 8–2. After being converted to a reliever, Elliott did much better, finishing the season with a 3.27 ERA in 30 total games, with his ERA as a reliever being 2.97.

== Later career ==
Due to a shoulder injury suffered during the 1994 season, Elliott made only one appearance in the majors in 1995, on September 19. In two innings, he allowed two hits and one walk, while striking out three batters. He allowed zero earned runs. That would be the final game of his big league career. In the minors that season, he spent seven games with the Las Vegas Stars, posting a 4.50 ERA in eight innings.

Even though his big league career was over, he stuck around in the minors for a while. In 1996, he was back in the Phillies organization, pitching for the Scranton/Wilkes-Barre Red Barons. He went 5–11 with a 4.79 ERA as a starter. He did not play affiliated baseball in 1997, and in 1998 he played his final season, this time in the Texas Rangers organization. Pitching for the Tulsa Drillers, he went 1–1 with a 5.79 ERA in 20 relief appearances.

Overall, he appeared in 31 games in the majors, making 1 start and going 0–1 with a 3.09 ERA.

== Technique ==
One day during the 1994 season, Elliott's teammate, Trevor Hoffman asked Elliott how he threw his change-up. Elliott showed Hoffman his usual grip of pinching his index finger and thumb together at the point of release. Hoffman perfected this pitch and credits this usual grip as helping him master one of the nastiest change-ups in the major leagues. Ironically, Elliott developed his unusual grip because after facing Jim Thome in Triple A in 1993, Elliott needed assurance that his changeup would tail away from the powerful Thome and not float down and in to the power hitter. Ironically it was Jim Thome who caused Elliott to develop the unusual changeup grip, the same grip Elliott showed Hoffman. Thome, Hoffman and Elliott's former Triple A teammate Chipper Jones, were all inducted into the 2019 Baseball Hall of Fame together. Elliott is now teaching his change-up to high school pitchers as he is currently the head baseball coach at Deer Park High School in the Deer Park Independent School District. Elliott was a high school teammate of former Philadelphia Eagles defensive lineman Tommy Jeter and New York Yankees pitcher and fellow Deer Park High School alum, Andy Pettitte.
