= Hiroshi Fujimoto (baseball) =

Japanese baseball player (born 1963)

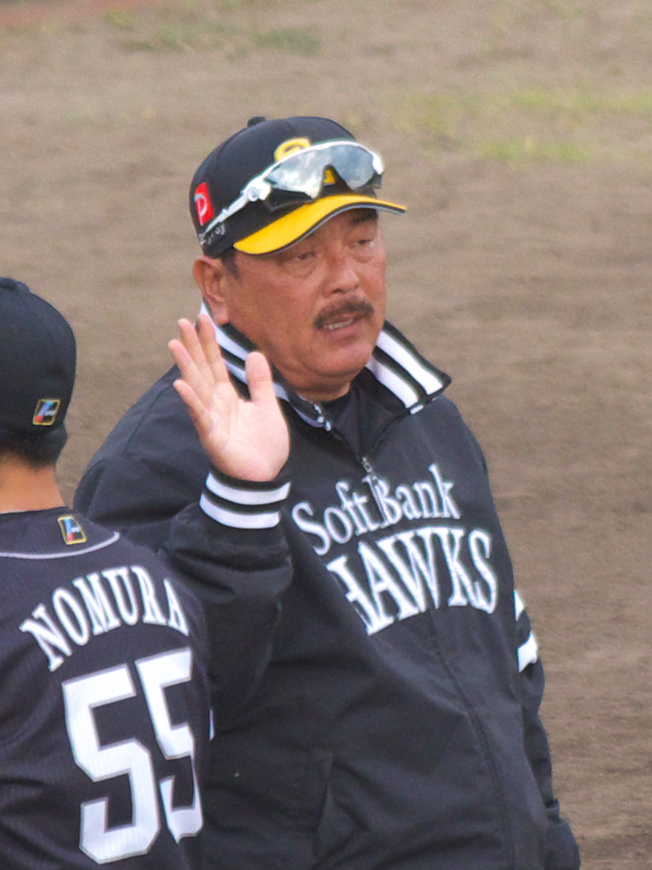
- Infielder / Coach / Manager
- Born: November 8, 1963 (age 62); Senboku, Osaka, Japan
- Batted: Right Threw: Right

NPB debut
- April 14, 1985, for the Nankai Hawks

Last appearance
- July 18, 1998, for the Orix BlueWave

NPB statistics (through 1998)
- Batting average: .235
- Hits: 715
- Home runs: 105
- Runs batted in: 419
- Stolen bases: 10

Teams
- As player: Nankai Hawks / Fukuoka Daiei Hawks (1982–1998); Orix BlueWave (1998); As coach: Fukuoka SoftBank Hawks (2011–2020); As manager: Fukuoka SoftBank Hawks (2021–2023)

Hiroshi Fujimoto (藤本 博史, Fujimoto Hiroshi; born November 8, 1963) is a Japanese former Nippon Professional Baseball infielder He played in Nippon Professional Baseball (NPB) for the Nankai/Fukuoka Daiei Hawks and the Orix Blue Wave.

== Early baseball career ==
Fujimoto went on to Tenri High School, where he competed in the 62nd Japanese High School Baseball Championship in the summer of his sophomore year.

== Playing career ==
On November 25, 1981, Fujimoto was drafted by the Nankai Hawks in the 1981 Nippon Professional Baseball draft.

On July 7, 1990, He accomplished hit for the cycle against the Nippon-Ham Fighters.

He was traded to the Orix Blue Wave early in the 1998 season and retired after that season.

Fujimoto played a total of 1103 games, batting average .235 with a 715 hits, a 105 home runs, and a 419 RBI.

His active player era fight song is still the Hawks's chance theme (the song played during scoring chances) as of the 2022 season.

== Post-playing career ==
Fujimoto ran a restaurant until 2010 while commentating on TVQ Kyushu Broadcasting's baseball broadcasts and critiquing Nishinippon Sports.

He has been the hitting coach for the second squad since the 2011 season and has served as the first squad hitting coach, second squad manager, and third squad manager before being named first squad manager for the 2022 season.

On October 17, 2023, Fujimoto's contract expired, and he was replaced as manager by Hiroki Kokubo.
