= Junji Hoshino =

Japanese baseball player (born 1974)

Fukuoka SoftBank Hawks – No. 020
- Pitcher / Coach
- Born: June 18, 1974 (age 51); Ushibuka, Niigata, Japan
- Batted: Right Threw: Right

NPB debut
- August 11, 1998, for the Fukuoka Daiei Hawks

Last NPB appearance
- August 19, 2008, for the Fukuoka SoftBank Hawks

NPB statistics
- Win–loss record: 50-48
- Earned run average: 4.26
- Strikeouts: 373

Teams
- As player: Fukuoka Daiei Hawks/Fukuoka SoftBank Hawks (1998–2008); As coach: Fukuoka SoftBank Hawks (2009–2010, 2023–present)

Career highlights and awards
- As player: 2× Japan Series champion (1999, 2003); As coach: Japan Series champion (2025)

Junji Hoshino (星野 順治, Hoshino Junji; born June 18, 1974) is a Japanese former professional baseball pitcher, and current pitcher's coordinator for the Fukuoka SoftBank Hawks of Nippon Professional Baseball (NPB).

He previously played for the Fukuoka Daiei Hawks.

== Professional career ==
=== Active player era ===
On November 21, 1997, Hoshino was drafted fourth overall by the Fukuoka Daiei Hawks in the 1997 Nippon Professional Baseball draft.

During the 1998 season, he made his Pacific League debut and pitched in two games.

In the second year of his career, he posted a 10-8 win–loss record and a 3.98 ERA in 21 games pitched, and contributed to the Fukuoka Daiei Hawks' first Pacific League championship.

He recorded 13 wins in the 2001 season, his most as a starting pitcher.

In his 11-season career, Hoshino pitched in a total of 156 games, recorded to a 50–48 win–loss record, one hold, and a 4.26 ERA. He retired during the 2008 season.

=== After retirement ===
After his retirement, Hoshino served as assistant conditioning coach for the Fukuoka SoftBank Hawks from the 2009 and 2010 seasons. He moved to the Hawks' front office in the 2011 season, where he served as a staff member in charge of development, director of development, and head of the development department.

He serve as the fourth squad pitcher's coordinator since the 2023 season.
