= Shuji Yoshida =

Japanese baseball player and coach

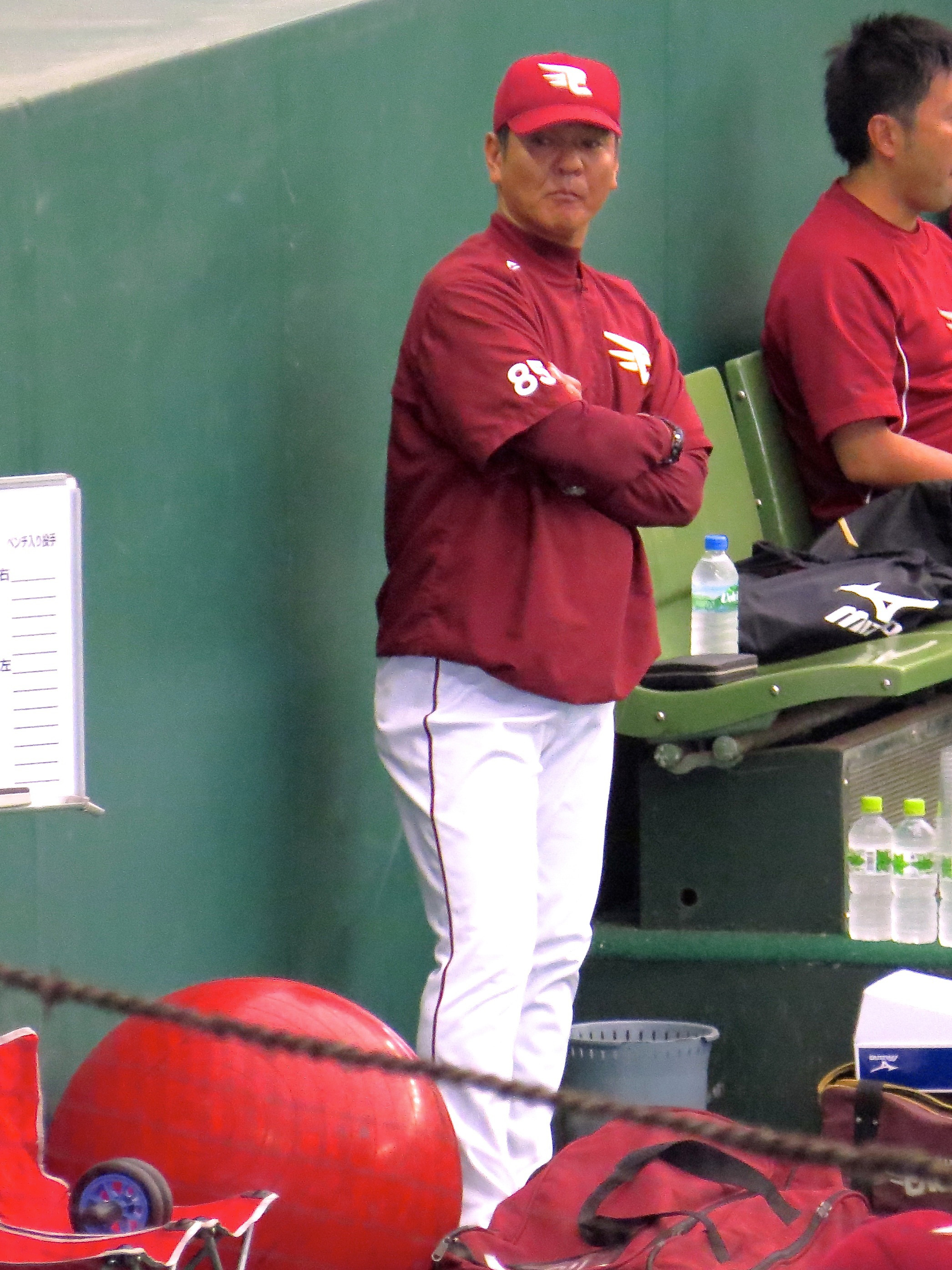
- Yoshida with the Tohoku Rakuten Golden Eagles
- Pitcher / Coach
- Born: November 29, 1966 (age 59); Kōnan, Aichi, Japan
- Batted: Left Threw: Left

NPB debut
- July 21, 1989, for the Yomiuri Giants

Last NPB appearance
- July 25, 2007, for the Orix Buffaloes

NPB statistics
- Win–loss record: 37–32
- Saves: 23
- Earned run average: 3.57
- Strikeouts: 511
- Stats at Baseball Reference

Teams
- As player: Yomiuri Giants (1989–1994); Fukuoka Daiei Hawks / Fukuoka SoftBank Hawks (1994–2006); Orix Buffaloes (2007); As coach: Fukuoka SoftBank Hawks (2013–2014); Tohoku Rakuten Golden Eagles (2015)

Career highlights and awards
- 3× Japan Series champion (1989, 1999, 2003); 2× NPB All-Star (2000, 2002)
Medals
Men's baseball
Representing Japan
Olympic Games
Silver medal – second place	1988 Seoul	Team

Shuji Yoshida (吉田 修司, Yoshida Shūji; born November 29, 1966) is a former Nippon Professional Baseball pitcher and coach. He was a member of the Japan national baseball team that won the silver medal at the 1988 Seoul Olympic Games.

== Career ==
Yoshida attended Taki High School in Aichi Prefecture, where he helped his team reach the quarterfinals of the 1984 Aichi Tournament before losing to Kasugaioka High School. After graduation, he joined the Takushoku Bank baseball team in Hokkaido, participating in the Intercity Baseball Tournament for two consecutive years beginning in 1987. In 1988, he was selected to represent Japan at the 1988 Summer Olympics. Yoshida contributed to Japan's silver medal finish. Yoshida was selected by the Yomiuri Giants as their first-round pick in the 1988 Nippon Professional Baseball draft.
