= Rod Pedraza =

- Pitcher
- Born: December 28, 1969 (age 56); San Antonio, Texas, U.S.
- Batted: Right Threw: Right

debut
- 1999, for the Fukuoka Daiei Hawks

Last appearance
- 2003, for the Yomiuri Giants

Career statistics
- Win–loss record: 12–12
- Earned run average: 2.99
- Strikeouts: 126
- Saves: 117
- Stats at Baseball Reference

Teams
- Fukuoka Daiei Hawks (1999–2002); Yomiuri Giants (2003)

Rodney Bernard Pedraza (born December 28, 1969) is an American former professional baseball pitcher in Nippon Professional Baseball (NPB). He played for the Fukuoka Daiei Hawks from 1999 to 2002 and Yomiuri Giants in 2003. He was an All- Star four out of his five seasons in Japan. Prior to his career in Japan, he played Minor League Baseball in the Montreal Expos, Colorado Rockies and Texas Rangers organization from 1991 to 1998.

== Draft ==
Pedraza was drafted to in the 35th round to the Chicago Cubs in the 1988 amateur draft right out of high school. He instead spent 3 years at the University of Texas (including a 5-0 record the year they finished second at the 1989 College World Series), and had gone 13-3 with a 3.33 ERA in college. In the 1991 amateur draft he was drafted by the Montreal Expos. He made his debut with the Jamestown Expos and Sumter Flyers in 1991. In 1992, he had gone 13-8, 3.26 record for the Albany Polecats. He led the South Atlantic League with 186 hits allowed, and he fell one short of the win lead. In 1993 he played for San Bernardino Spirit, and went 9-7 with a 3.18 ERA. He was second in the California League in ERA. He then played for the Colorado Rockies. In the Rockies chain, he debuted with the New Haven Ravens and Colorado Springs Sky Socks in 1994. He was 7th in the Eastern League in ERA and was chosen for the Eastern League All-Star team. In addition, he was rated for best control in the Eastern League by Baseball America. Rodney missed all of 1995 due to a shoulder injury, but returned in 1996 and did well with New Haven. He finished 3rd in the Eastern League in ERA. In 1997 Pedraza played for the Winnipeg Goldeyes. Then, in 1998 he signed with the Texas Rangers. He split the year with the Charlotte Rangers and the Tulsa Drillers.

== Japan ==
Rodney signed with the Fukuoka Daiei Hawks in 1999. He debuted in Japan by going 3-1 with 27 saves and a 1.98 ERA. He finished second in the Pacific League in saves, and he made the Pacific League All-Star team. In the 1999 Japan Series, Pedraza saved games 4 and 5, and pitched 3 1/3 shutout innings in the Series, allowing one hit and no walks. In 2000, he went 3-4 with 35 saves and a 2.15 ERA. He also had a WHIP of .77 with 4 walks and 35 hits in 50 1/3 IP. He was again picked for the Pacific League All-Star team, and he led the Pacific League in saves. He tied Eddie Gaillard for the most saves in all of Nippon Pro Baseball. In addition, he also tied Otsuka's Pacific League save record (which was later broken by Kiyoshi Toyoda). Pedraza became the second American to be named Fireman of the Year in the Pacific League. In the 2000 Japan Series, he saved game one and threw two shutout innings. In 2001 he was once again an All-Star and he led the Pacific League in saves and points. For the second year in a row, Pedraza was awarded the Fireman of the Year. He was the second repeat foreign winner in Nippon Pro Baseball history and the first in the Pacific League. In 2002 Pedraza remained the closer for the Hawks, and he made the All-Star team for the 4th time. He became the first American to save 100 games in Nippon Pro Baseball. In 2003 he was signed to the Yomiuri Giants, and his performance suffered due to another shoulder injury.

== Career stats ==
Overall, Rodney went 16-12 with 117 saves and a 2.99 ERA in 194 games in Nippon Pro Baseball and 65-40 with a 3.82 ERA in 159 minor league games. Through 2009, he was 19th in Nippon Pro Baseball annals in saves and 3rd among foreign-born hurlers.

== Retirement ==
After the end of his playing career, he moved back to Cuero, Texas. On March 2, 2007 he was inducted into the Latinos in Action hall of fame. He was a member of the Cuero Gobblers' 1987 state championship football team, and was inducted into the Cuero Gobbler hall of fame in 2009. In 2008, he married Deborah, and they have three daughters Lauren, Kendall, Mia.
