= Hiroki Kokubo =

Japanese baseball player (born 1971)

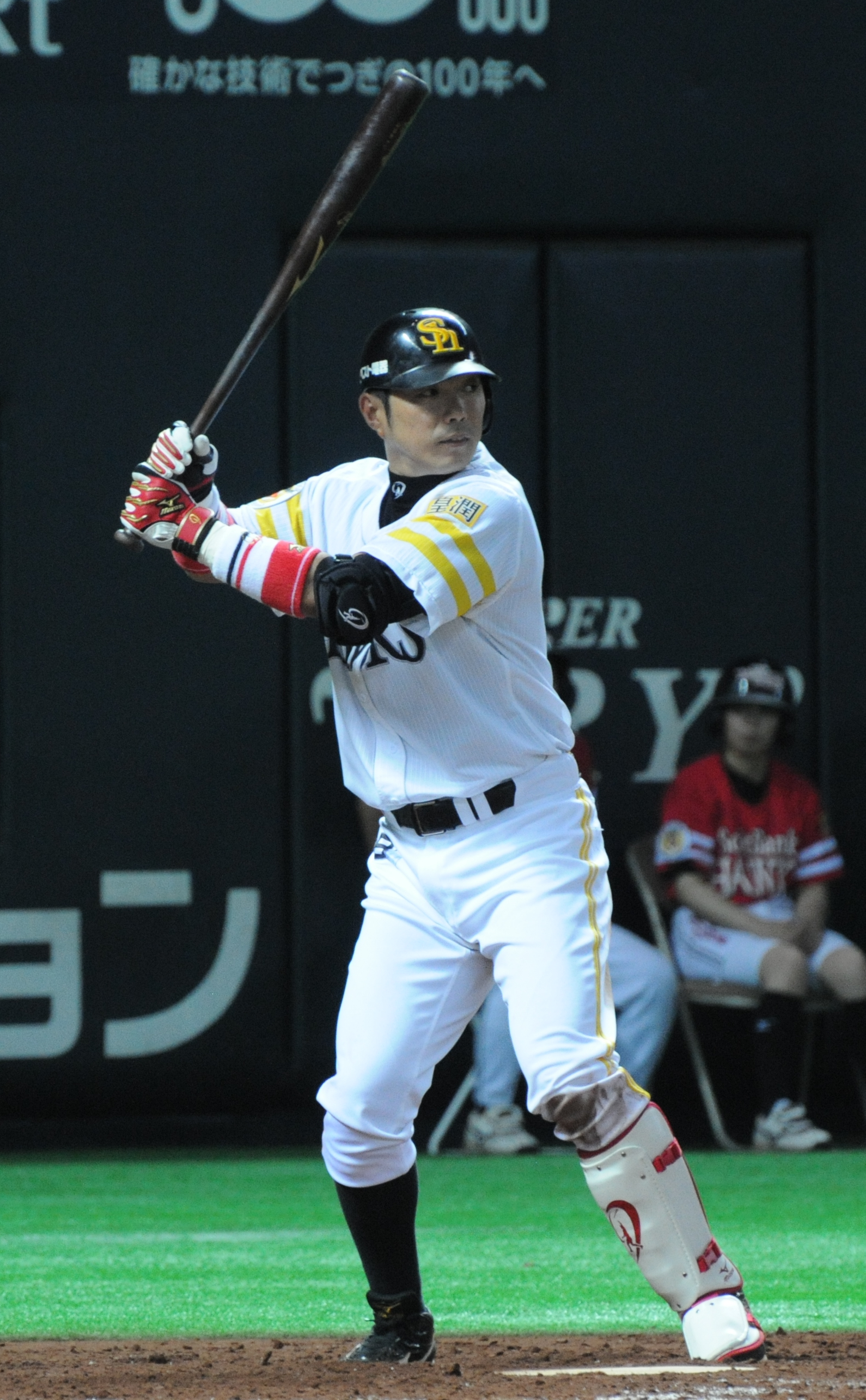

Fukuoka SoftBank Hawks – No. 90
- First baseman / Third baseman / Manager
- Born: October 8, 1971 (age 55); Wakayama, Japan
- Batted: Right-handed Threw: Right

NPB debut
- April 9, 1994, for the Fukuoka Daiei Hawks

Last NPB appearance
- October 8, 2012, for the Fukuoka SoftBank Hawks

NPB statistics
- Batting average: .273
- Hits: 2,041
- Home runs: 413
- Runs batted in: 1,304
- Stats at Baseball Reference

Teams
- As player: Fukuoka Daiei Hawks (1994–2003); Yomiuri Giants (2004–2006); Fukuoka SoftBank Hawks (2007–2012); As manager: Japan national baseball team (2013–2017); As coach & manager: Fukuoka SoftBank Hawks (2021–present)

Career highlights and awards
- As player: 3× Golden Glove Award (1995, 2010, 2011); 3× Best Nine Award (1995, 1997, 2011); 3× Monthly MVP (June 2000, July 2004, April 2007); Comeback Player of the Year Award (2004); 2x Japan Series champion (1999, 2011); Japan Series MVP (2011); 11× All-Star (1995–1997, 2000–2002, 2004, 2007–2009, 2011); As manager/coach: Japan Series champion (2025); 2x Matsutaro Shoriki Award recipient (2025, 2026)
Medals
Men's baseball
Representing Japan
Olympic Games
Bronze medal – third place	1992 Barcelona	Team

Hiroki Kokubo (小久保 裕紀, Kokubo Hiroki; born October 8, 1971) is a Japanese former professional baseball infielder, and current manager for the Fukuoka SoftBank Hawks of Nippon Professional Baseball (NPB). He played in NPB for the Hawks and Yomiuri Giants, and recorded over 2,000 hits across his 19 year career.

== Early baseball career ==
Kokubo went on to Aoyama Gakuin University, where he became captain and helped his team win its first 1993 Japan National Collegiate Baseball Championship in his senior year.

== Professional career ==
=== Active player era ===
Kokubo was selected by the Fukuoka Daiei Hawks in the second round of the 1993 Nippon Professional Baseball draft under the system for expressing a team of choice.

He debuted in the Pacific League in his rookie season of 1994, playing in 78 games.

Kokubo was one of Japan's leading power hitters during the 1990s and early 2000s. He hit over 40 home runs in 2001 and 2004 but only led the league in the category once (1995), with only 28 home runs. He also led the league in RBIs in 1997. However, he played in just 17 games in 1998, which saw him marred by a tax evasion scandal that had broken out in late 1997 where he was indicted on charges of evading at least $215,000 on his income tax in 1994 by falsely recording expenses on receipts; he pled guilty to the charge. He suffered a knee injury in spring training that knocked him out for the entire 2003 season. He was suddenly given away to the Yomiuri Giants in November of that year despite being the team's cleanup hitter. Kokubo was seemingly given away for free, since the Giants did not give a player to the Hawks in exchange. The motives behind this transaction remain a mystery. The Hawks replaced him during his injuries with foreigner Julio Zuleta.

He played with the Yomiuri Giants for three years before signing with his former team (now the Fukuoka SoftBank Hawks) during the 2006 off-season as a free agent.

In 2011, as team captain, he helped lead the Hawks to victory in the Japan Series, winning the Most Valuable Player Award.

On June 24, 2012, Kokubo recorded his 2,000th career hit, becoming the 41st Japanese professional baseball player to reach the milestone. On August 14 he announced his intention to retire at the end of the 2012 season. His retirement ceremony was held on October 8, after the last regular-season match against the Orix Buffaloes, which SoftBank lost after being no-hit.

=== After retirement ===
After his retirement, He worked for NHK as a baseball broadcast commentator.

=== Coaching career ===
On December 3, 2020, Kokubo became the head coach of the Fukuoka SoftBank Hawks, returning to the team for the first time since his retirement in 2012.

On November 1, 2021, Kokubo was named the manager of the Hawks second level team, where he managed the Hawks to a Western League and Japan Farm League championship in 2023. Afterwards, he replaced Hiroshi Fujimoto as the manager of the first team in 2024, after Fujimoto announced he was going to step down as manager following the conclusion of the 2023 Pacific League Climax Series. Kokubo immediately led the Hawks to the Pacific League pennant in 2024, setting the NPB record for the most wins in a season by a first-year manager, but the Hawks would be upset by the Yokohama DeNA BayStars in the 2024 Japan Series. Kokubo would once again lead the Hawks to another pennant in 2025, this time defeating the Hanshin Tigers in 5 games to take home the 2025 Japan Series, the Hawks' first Japan Series championship since 2020. In 2026, he led the Hawks to their third PL pennant in a row, a feat they hadn't accomplished since 1964-1966, becoming only the third manager in NPB history, behind Masaaki Mori and Satoshi Nakajima, to win three pennants in a row in their first three seasons as a manager.

== International career ==
He won a bronze medal in the 1992 Summer Olympics before entering the Japanese professional leagues.

In October 2013, Kokubo was named the manager of the Japan national baseball team, becoming the first Japanese national team manager since the advent of baseball becoming a medal sport in the 1992 Summer Olympics to hold the position without any prior coaching experience. He would lead Samurai Japan to a 3rd place finish at the 2017 World Baseball Classic. He would resign from his managerial position following the semi-final defeat in 2017 at the hands of the United States.

== See also ==
- Nippon Professional Baseball Comeback Player of the Year Award
- List of Nippon Professional Baseball career hits leaders
- List of top Nippon Professional Baseball home run hitters
- List of Nippon Professional Baseball players with 1,000 runs batted in
