= Kenji Johjima =

Japanese baseball player (born 1976)

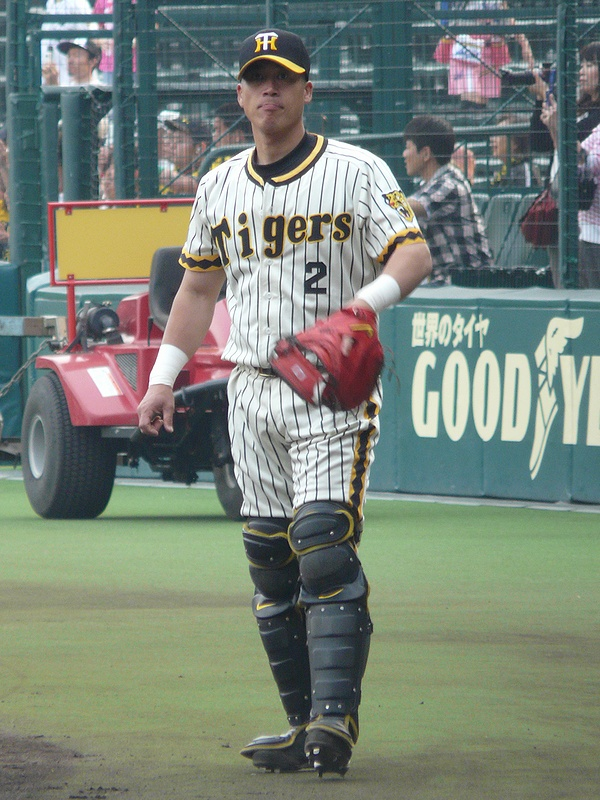
- Johjima with the Hanshin Tigers
- Catcher
- Born: June 8, 1976 (age 50); Sasebo, Japan
- Batted: Right Threw: Right

Professional debut
- NPB: May 31, 1995, for the Fukuoka Daiei Hawks
- MLB: April 3, 2006, for the Seattle Mariners

Last appearance
- MLB: October 3, 2009, for the Seattle Mariners
- NPB: May 9, 2012, for the Hanshin Tigers

NPB statistics
- Batting average: .296
- Home runs: 244
- Runs batted in: 808

MLB statistics
- Batting average: .268
- Home runs: 48
- Runs batted in: 198
- Stats at Baseball Reference

Teams
- Fukuoka Daiei / Fukuoka SoftBank Hawks (1995–2005); Seattle Mariners (2006–2009); Hanshin Tigers (2010–2012)

Career highlights and awards
- 10× NPB All-Star (1997–2005, 2010); 2× Japan Series champion (1999, 2003); Pacific League MVP (2003); 7× Golden Glove (1999–2005); 6× Best Nine Award (1999–2001, 2003–2005)
Medals
Men's baseball
Representing Japan
Olympic Games
Bronze medal – third place	2004 Athens	Team
World Baseball Classic
Gold medal – first place	2009 Los Angeles	Team

Kenji Johjima (城島 健司, Jōjima Kenji; born June 8, 1976) /ˈdʒoʊdʒiːmə/ is a Japanese former professional baseball player. He was a catcher for the Seattle Mariners of Major League Baseball (MLB) from 2006 to 2009, playing for the Fukuoka SoftBank Hawks of Nippon Professional Baseball (NPB) prior to playing in the United States, then returning to Japan and to play for the Hanshin Tigers for three seasons. Johjima also played for the Japan national team in the in the 2004 Summer Olympics in Athens and 2006 World Baseball Classic.

== Professional career ==
=== Fukuoka Daiei Hawks/Fukuoka SoftBank Hawks ===
Johjima was named to the Pacific League's Best Nine for the first time as the Fukuoka Daiei Hawks won the Japan Series and the Pacific League championship. He hit .306 with 33 doubles and 17 home runs, ranking third in the league in batting average behind Ichiro Suzuki and Kazuo Matsui. He ranked third in doubles and won his first Golden Glove.

He batted .310 in 2000, again earning Best Nine honors. He was also named an All-Star while winning another Golden Glove, while stealing a career-best 10 bases.

In 2001, Johjima hit 31 home runs and collected 95 runs batted in (RBI), and was again named to Best Nine. He was selected to All-Star team and won his third consecutive Gold Glove. He played a career-high 140 games.

In 2002 Johjima won his fourth consecutive Gold Glove while batting .293.

In 2003, he helped lead the Hawks to another Pacific League championship and was named Pacific League's Most Valuable Player. Johjima batted .330 and hit 34 home runs and posted career highs of 101 runs, 182 hits, 39 doubles, 119 RBI, 53 walks, .655 slugging percentage and .432 on-base percentage. He tied his career high of 140 games played while winning his fifth straight Golden Glove, made his fourth Best Nine and sixth All-Star squad. He led the Pacific League in total bases, second in hits, RBI, doubles and third in home runs and runs.

He missed part of the 2004 NPB season while playing in the Olympics but still managed career-highs of .338 and 36 home runs. Johjima was hit by a pitch 22 times, breaking Ichiro's previous Pacific League mark of 18. In the Olympics, he homered, doubled twice and had four RBI to lead Japan to 11–2 win over Canada for the bronze medal. He ranked fifth among Olympians with a .378 batting average and seventh with seven runs scored.

A seven-time All-Star for the Hawks, Johjima became a free agent after hitting .309 with 24 home runs and 57 RBI in 116 games, during the 2005 season, which was cut short by two injuries, including a broken leg.

From 1996 through 2005, Johjima hit .299 with 211 home runs and 699 RBI in 1,117 games. His most productive season came in 2003, when he hit .330 with 119 RBI, and finished third with 34 home runs behind Tuffy Rhodes (51) and Alex Cabrera (50).

As a catcher, Johjima had 6,321 outs with 572 assists and 48 errors in 6,941 chances for a .993 fielding average. He posted a .376 caught stealing percentage (222-for-591).

=== Seattle Mariners ===
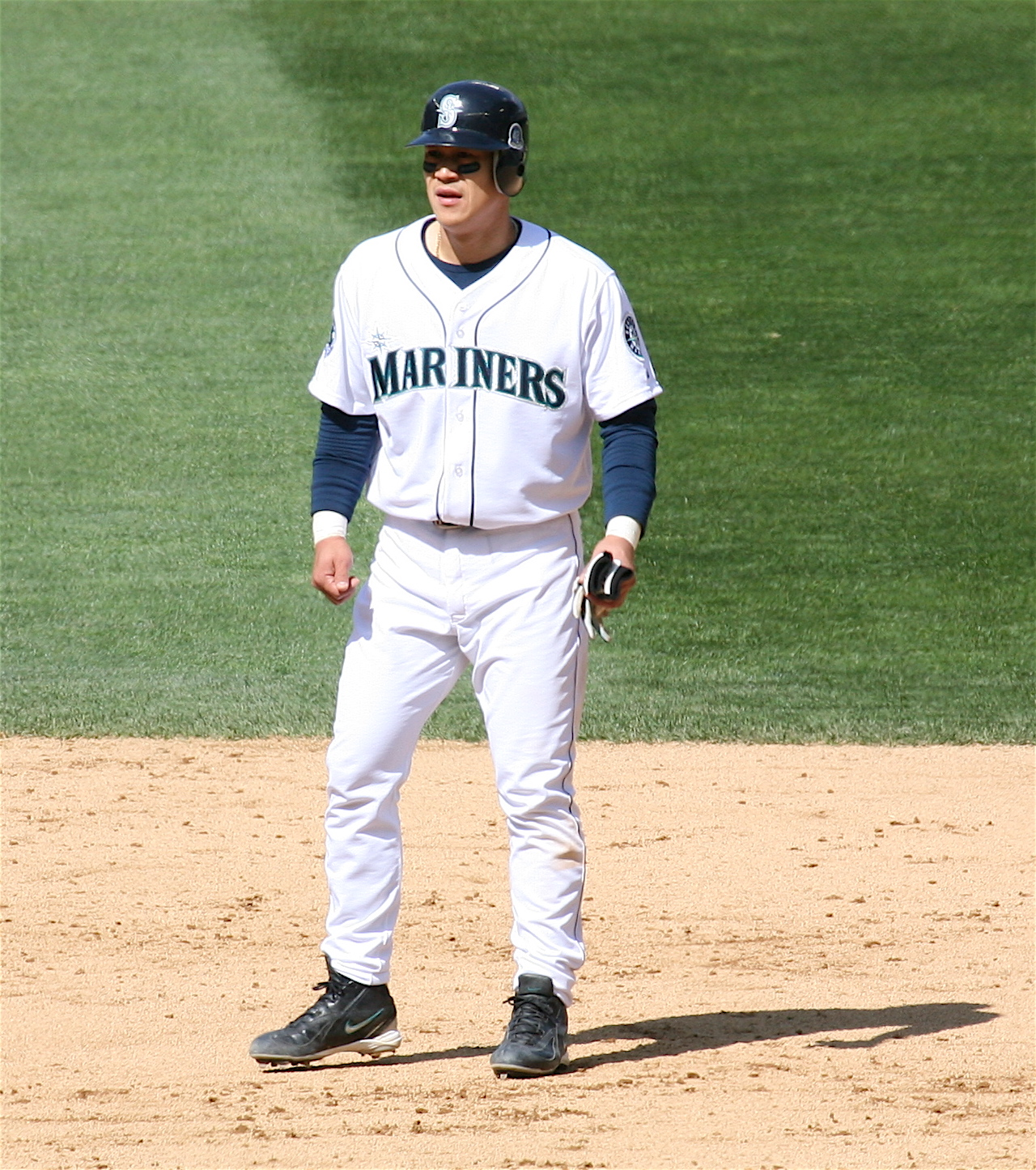
Johjima with the Mariners

On November 21, 2005, Johjima signed a three-year, $16.5 million contract with the Seattle Mariners. Johjima became the first Japanese player to catch full-time in the major leagues. Infielder Lenn Sakata, a Japanese-American born in Honolulu, caught one game for the Baltimore Orioles, winning a World Series ring in 1983.

Prior to his MLB debut, Johjima played in the 2006 World Baseball Classic. He batted .333 in nine games as Japan won the inaugural international tournament.

On April 3, 2006, Johjima and Ichiro Suzuki became the first pair of Japanese position players to take the field in an MLB starting lineup. Johjima hit a home run in each of his first two MLB games against the Los Angeles Angels of Anaheim on April 3 and April 4, 2006 in Seattle. He was the first catcher since Jerry Moore in 1884 to hit a home run in his first major league game.

In his rookie season with the Mariners, Johjima hit .291 with 18 home runs and 76 RBIs in 144 games. His 18 home runs matched the franchise record for catchers. Johjima hit .322 in August and .295 during the second half of the season. He hit two home runs and drove in a career-best five runs on June 27 against the Arizona Diamondbacks.

In 2006, Johjima set the record for most hits by a rookie catcher, with 147. The previous record was 146. He also led the American League (AL) by reaching base 13 times on an error (13),

In 2007, Johjima ranked fifth in AL in hit by pitches (11) and sixth with 22 grounded into double plays. His 11 hit by pitches was tied for fifth-most in Mariners history. Among AL catchers, ranked third in hits, fourth in batting average, doubles and RBI. Johjima hit his first career grand slam May 26 against the Kansas City Royals off of Brian Bannister; he also hit grand slam July 14 against the Detroit Tigers.

In 2008, Johjima started 95 games at catcher. In his first three seasons, he caught 3112.2 innings, 5th-most in the majors. He threw out 18 of 69 attempted base stealers. On April 15, he collected his 1,500th professional career hit with a double, with 294 hits with the Mariners and 1,206 in Japan. Johjima stole home May 31, his first career steal of home plate and his second stolen base since the start of 2007. However, he batted a career-low .227 with 7 home runs.

On April 25, 2008, the Johjima agreed to a three-year, $24 million contract extension with the Mariners. However, 2009 would be his final season in MLB. He hit .247 with nine home runs in an MLB-career-low 74 games.

=== Return to Japan ===
After losing playing time to two other catchers in the 2009 season, Johjima opted out of the final two years of this extension so he could return to playing in Japan, where he signed with the Hanshin Tigers of Japan's Central League. He retired a month into the 2012 season.

== Career statistics ==
=== NPB ===
Year	Age	Team	Lg	G	AB	R	H	2B	3B	HR	TB	RBIs	SB	CS	BB	SO	BA	SLG	OBP
1995	18	DAI	PL	12	12	2	2	2	0	0	0	2	1	0	0	1	.167	.167	.231
1996	19	DAI	PL	17	58	5	14	2	0	4	28	9	1	0	3	9	.241	.483	.290
1997	20	DAI	PL	120	432	49	133	24	2	15	206	68	6	2	22	62	.308	.477	.343
1998	21	DAI	PL	122	395	53	99	19	0	16	166	58	5	2	27	67	.251	.420	.309
1999	22	DAI	PL	135	493	65	151	33	1	17	237	77	6	2	31	61	.306	.481	.356
2000	23	DAI	PL	84	303	38	94	22	2	9	147	50	10	2	27	48	.310	.485	.377
2001	24	DAI	PL	140	534	63	138	18	0	31	249	95	9	4	31	55	.258	.466	.305
2002	25	DAI	PL	115	416	60	122	18	0	25	215	74	8	7	30	41	.293	.517	.348
2003	26	DAI	PL	140	551	101	182	39	2	34	327	119	9	4	53	50	.330	.593	.399
2004	27	DAI	PL	116	426	91	144	25	1	36	279	91	6	5	49	45	.338	.655	.432
2005	28	SFT	PL	116	411	70	127	22	4	24	229	57	3	4	33	32	.309	.557	.381
2010	33	HAN	CL	144	554	76	168	29	0	28	281	91	9	5	27	53	.303	.507	.352
2011	34	HAN	CL	38	132	7	25	3	0	5	43	13	0	0	8	16	.189	.326	.243
2012	35	HAN	CL	24	39	4	7	1	0	0	8	5	0	0	2	4	.179	.205	.214
Totals:				1323	4756	684	1406	255	12	244	2417	808	72	37	344	547	.296	.508	.355

=== MLB American League ===
Year	Age	Team	Lg	G	AB	R	H	2B	3B	HR	TB	RBIs	SB	CS	BB	SO	BA	SLG	OBP
2006	29	SEA	AL	144	542	61	147	25	1	18	228	76	3	1	20	46	.291	.451	.332
2007	30	SEA	AL	135	513	52	139	29	0	14	210	61	0	2	15	41	.287	.433	.322
2008	31	SEA	AL	112	409	29	86	19	0	7	126	39	2	0	19	33	.227	.332	.277
2009	32	SEA	AL	71	239	24	59	11	0	9	97	22	2	2	12	28	.247	.406	.296
Totals:				462	1609	166	431	84	1	48	661	198	7	5	66	148	.268	.411	.310

== Personal life ==
Johjima resides in Sasebo, Japan with his wife and two children.

Johjima often called himself "George Mackenzie" as opposed to "Johjima Kenji", especially before he played in MLB
