= 2000 Nippon Professional Baseball season =

2000 NPB season
- League: Nippon Professional Baseball
- Sport: Baseball

Regular season
- Season MVP: CL: Hideki Matsui (YOM); PL: Nobuhiko Matsunaka (DAI)

League postseason
- CL champions: Yomiuri Giants
- CL runners-up: Chunichi Dragons
- PL champions: Fukuoka Daiei Hawks
- PL runners-up: Seibu Lions

Japan Series
- Champions: Yomiuri Giants
- Runners-up: Fukuoka Daiei Hawks
- Finals MVP: Hideki Matsui (YOM)

NPB seasons
- ← 1999 2001 →

The 2000 Nippon Professional Baseball season was the 51st season since the NPB was reorganized in 1950.

== Regular season standings ==
=== Central League ===
Central League	G	W	L	T	Pct.	GB
Yomiuri Giants	135	78	57	0	.578	–
Chunichi Dragons	135	70	65	0	.519	8.0
Yokohama BayStars	136	69	66	1	.512	9.0
Yakult Swallows	136	66	69	1	.489	12.0
Hiroshima Toyo Carp	136	65	70	1	.481	13.0
Hanshin Tigers	136	57	78	1	.422	21.0

=== Pacific League ===
Pacific League	G	W	L	T	Pct.	GB
Fukuoka Daiei Hawks	135	73	60	2	.549	–
Seibu Lions	135	69	61	5	.531	2.5
Nippon-Ham Fighters	135	69	65	1	.515	4.5
Orix BlueWave	135	64	67	4	.489	8.0
Chiba Lotte Marines	135	62	67	6	.481	9.0
Osaka Kintetsu Buffaloes	135	58	75	2	.436	15.0

== Japan Series ==
Yomiuri Giants (4) vs. Fukuoka Daiei Hawks (2)

Game	Score	Date	Location	Attendance
1	Giants – 3, Hawks – 5	October 21	Tokyo Dome	43,848
2	Giants – 3, Hawks – 8	October 22	Tokyo Dome	43,850
3	Hawks – 3, Giants – 9	October 23	Fukuoka Dome	36,625
4	Hawks – 1, Giants – 2	October 26	Fukuoka Dome	36,701
5	Hawks – 0, Giants – 6	October 27	Fukuoka Dome	36,787
6	Giants – 9, Hawks – 3	October 28	Tokyo Dome	44,033

== See also ==
- 2000 Major League Baseball season
