= 2001 Nippon Professional Baseball season =

2001 NPB season
- League: Nippon Professional Baseball
- Sport: Baseball

Regular season
- Season MVP: CL: Roberto Petagine (YAK); PL: Tuffy Rhodes (KIN)

League postseason
- CL champions: Yakult Swallows
- CL runners-up: Yomiuri Giants
- PL champions: Osaka Kintetsu Buffaloes
- PL runners-up: Fukuoka Daiei Hawks

Japan Series
- Champions: Yakult Swallows
- Runners-up: Osaka Kintetsu Buffaloes
- Finals MVP: Atsuya Furuta (Yakult Swallows)

NPB seasons
- ← 2000 2002 →

The 2001 Nippon Professional Baseball season ended with the Yakult Swallows defeating the Osaka Kintetsu Buffaloes in the 2001 Japan Series 4 games to 1.

== Standings ==
=== Central League ===
Central League	G	W	L	T	Pct.	GB
Yakult Swallows	140	76	58	6	.567	-
Yomiuri Giants	140	75	63	2	.543	3
Yokohama BayStars	140	69	67	4	.507	8
Hiroshima Toyo Carp	140	68	65	7	.511	7.5
Chunichi Dragons	140	62	74	4	.456	15
Hanshin Tigers	140	57	80	3	.416	20.5

=== Pacific League ===
Pacific League	G	W	L	T	Pct.	GB
Osaka Kintetsu Buffaloes	140	78	60	2	.565	-
Fukuoka Daiei Hawks	140	76	63	1	.547	2.5
Seibu Lions	140	73	67	0	.521	6.0
Orix BlueWave	140	70	66	4	.515	7.0
Chiba Lotte Marines	140	64	74	2	.464	14.0
Nippon-Ham Fighters	140	57	80	3	.416	20.5

== Japan Series ==
Yakult Swallows (4) vs. Osaka Kintetsu Buffaloes (1)

Game	Score	Date	Location	Attendance
1	Buffaloes – 0, Swallows – 7	October 20	Osaka Dome	33,837
2	Buffaloes – 9, Swallows – 6	October 21	Osaka Dome	33,277
3	Swallows – 9, Buffaloes – 2	October 23	Jingu Stadium	30,443
4	Swallows – 2, Buffaloes – 1	October 24	Jingu Stadium	32,145
5	Swallows – 4, Buffaloes – 2	October 25	Jingu Stadium	32,568

== League leaders ==
=== Central League ===
Batting leaders
Stat	Player	Team	Total
Batting average	Hideki Matsui	Yomiuri Giants	.333
Home runs	Roberto Petagine	Yakult Swallows	39
Runs batted in	Roberto Petagine	Yakult Swallows	127
Hits	Takuro Ishii	Yokohama BayStars	171
Stolen bases	Norihiro Akahoshi	Hanshin Tigers	39

Pitching leaders
Stat	Player	Team	Total
Wins	Shugo Fujii	Yakult Swallows	14
Earned run average	Shigeki Noguchi	Chunichi Dragons	2.46
Strikeouts	Shigeki Noguchi	Chunichi Dragons	187
Saves	Shingo Takatsu	Yakult Swallows	37

=== Pacific League ===
Batting leaders
Stat	Player	Team	Total
Batting average	Kazuya Fukuura	Chiba Lotte Marines	.346
Home runs	Tuffy Rhodes	Osaka Kintetsu Buffaloes	55
Runs batted in	Norihiro Nakamura	Osaka Kintetsu Buffaloes	132
Hits	Michihiro Ogasawara	Nippon-Ham Fighters	195
Stolen bases	Tadahito Iguchi	Fukuoka Daiei Hawks	44

Pitching leaders
Stat	Player	Team	Total
Wins	Daisuke Matsuzaka	Seibu Lions	15
Earned run average	Nate Minchey	Chiba Lotte Marines	3.26
Strikeouts	Daisuke Matsuzaka	Seibu Lions	214
Saves	Rodney Pedraza	Fukuoka Daiei Hawks	38

== See also ==
- 2001 Major League Baseball season
