= Shigeki Noguchi =

Japanese baseball player

- Pitcher
- Born: May 13, 1974 (age 50); Tōyo, Ehime, Japan
- Batted: Left Threw: Left

debut
- August 25, 1994, for the Chunichi Dragons

Last appearance
- August 14, 2007, for the Yomiuri Giants

Career statistics
- Win–loss record: 81–79
- Earned run average: 3.69
- Strikeouts: 1,122

Teams
- Chunichi Dragons (1993–2005); Yomiuri Giants (2006–2007)

Career highlights and awards
- Central League MVP (1999); 2x NPB ERA Champion (1998, 2001); NPB Strikeout Champion (2001)

Shigeki Noguchi (野口 茂樹; born May 13, 1974) is a Japanese former professional baseball pitcher in Nippon Professional Baseball. He played for the Chunichi Dragons from 1994 to 2005 and the Yomiuri Giants from 2006 to 2007. He was the Central League MVP in 1999 after going 19-7 with a 2.65 earned run average.

Noguchi also played Minor League Baseball in 1994 in the Colorado Rockies organization. In 2009, he signed a minor league deal with the Toronto Blue Jays but was released after failing a physical.
