= Richie Lewis =

American baseball player (1966–2021)

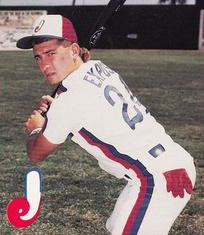
- Lewis in 1988
- Relief pitcher
- Born: January 25, 1966; Muncie, Indiana, U.S.
- Died: December 8, 2021 (aged 55); Melbourne, Florida, U.S.
- Batted: Right Threw: Right

MLB debut
- July 31, 1992, for the Baltimore Orioles

Last MLB appearance
- June 4, 1998, for the Baltimore Orioles

MLB statistics
- Win–loss record: 14–15
- Earned run average: 4.88
- Strikeouts: 244
- Stats at Baseball Reference

Teams
- Baltimore Orioles (1992); Florida Marlins (1993–1995); Detroit Tigers (1996); Oakland Athletics (1997); Cincinnati Reds (1997); Baltimore Orioles (1998)

Richie Todd Lewis (January 25, 1966 – December 8, 2021) was an American professional baseball player. He was a right-handed relief pitcher in Major League Baseball (MLB) who played from 1992 to 1998 for the Baltimore Orioles, Florida Marlins, Detroit Tigers, Oakland Athletics, and Cincinnati Reds.

== Early life ==
Lewis was born in 1966 to Kathy and Lawrence (Larry) Lewis. His younger sister, Emily, was born in 1971. Both of his parents were teachers throughout Lewis's childhood and were very involved in his life from a young age. His father coached all of his baseball, football, and basketball teams growing up as well.

== Career ==
Lewis attended Southside High School in Muncie, where his father was the coach for many years. He then went on to attend Florida State University . During his college career he had 520 strikeouts which was then a school record. He finished with a 38–12 record and led the Seminoles to consecutive College World Series appearances. 1986, he played collegiate summer baseball with the Falmouth Commodores of the Cape Cod Baseball League and was named a league all-star.

Originally drafted by the Montreal Expos 44th overall in the 1987 draft, Lewis spent a few years in the minors before making his big-league debut. He played only two games professionally in 1987, both in AAA ball. He proved to be a very valuable minor league player over the next few seasons, both as a starter and reliever. For example, he posted a 2.58 ERA in 1989 as a starter, and in 1990 with the Jacksonville Expos he posted a 1.26 ERA as a reliever.

He made his MLB debut on July 31, 1992, at the age of 26. Standing at the height of 5 ft 6 in (1.68 m), Lewis—who was one of the shortest players ever to pitch in the majors—pitched just over four innings in his debut (he started the game). He gave up five hits and walked six, but he still managed to earn the win.

Lewis was selected in the 51st round of the 1992 Expansion draft by the Florida Marlins. In 1995 he was inducted into the Florida State athletics hall of fame.

He was mostly used as a reliever for the rest of his career, with his best season being 1993. In 57 games, he posted a 3.26 ERA and 65 strikeouts. Overall, he went 14 and 15 in his career, with 191 walks, 244 strikeouts and a 4.88 ERA in 217 games. Although his major league career ended on June 4, 1998, he bounced around in the minors until 2003. In the fall of 1998, he took the entrance test at the fall training camp held by the Seibu Lions in Nangō, Miyazaki Prefecture, Japan, but his clearly nonchalant attitude angered the manager, Osamu Higashio, and he was told he had failed and to return home immediately. He was the pitching coach for the Columbus Catfish in 2006.

== Personal life ==
In 1992, during Lewis's time with the Rochester Red Wings, he met his wife, Andrea, in Rochester, New York, and they were married that same year. In March 1993, they had their first daughter, McKenzie. They had two more children after that, Mariah (1995) and Jacob (1998), and moved to Melbourne, Florida.

Lewis died on December 8, 2021, at the age of 55.
