= 1999 Nippon Professional Baseball season =

1999 NPB season
- League: Nippon Professional Baseball
- Sport: Baseball

Regular season
- Season MVP: CL: Shigeki Noguchi (CHU); PL: Kimiyasu Kudoh (DAI)

League postseason
- CL champions: Chunichi Dragons
- CL runners-up: Yomiuri Giants
- PL champions: Fukuoka Daiei Hawks
- PL runners-up: Seibu Lions

Japan Series
- Champions: Fukuoka Daiei Hawks
- Runners-up: Chunichi Dragons
- Finals MVP: Koji Akiyama (DAI)

NPB seasons
- ← 1998 2000 →

The 1999 Nippon Professional Baseball season was the 50th season of operation for the league.

== Regular season standings ==
=== Central League ===
Central League	G	W	L	T	Pct.	GB
Chunichi Dragons	135	81	54	0	.600	--
Yomiuri Giants	135	75	60	0	.556	6.0
Yokohama BayStars	135	71	64	0	.526	10.0
Yakult Swallows	135	66	69	0	.489	15.0
Hiroshima Toyo Carp	135	57	78	0	.422	24.0
Hanshin Tigers	135	55	80	0	.407	26.0

=== Pacific League ===
Pacific League	G	W	L	T	Pct.	GB
Fukuoka Daiei Hawks	135	78	54	3	.591	--
Seibu Lions	135	75	59	1	.560	4.0
Orix BlueWave	135	68	65	2	.511	10.5
Chiba Lotte Marines	135	63	70	2	.474	15.5
Nippon-Ham Fighters	135	60	73	2	.451	18.5
Osaka Kintetsu Buffaloes	135	54	77	4	.412	23.5

== Japan Series ==
Game	Score	Date	Location	Attendance
1	Hawks – 3, Dragons – 0	October 23	Fukuoka Dome	36,199
2	Hawks – 2, Dragons – 8	October 24	Fukuoka Dome	36,305
3	Dragons – 0, Hawks – 5	October 26	Nagoya Dome	37,832
4	Dragons – 0, Hawks – 3	October 27	Nagoya Dome	37,898
5	Dragons – 4, Hawks – 6	October 28	Nagoya Dome	38,011

== See also ==
- 1999 Major League Baseball season
