= Tohto University Baseball League =

Tokyo intercollegiate baseball league

- Founded: 1931
- No. of teams: 21
- Headquarters: Tokyo, Japan
- Region: Kantō, Japan

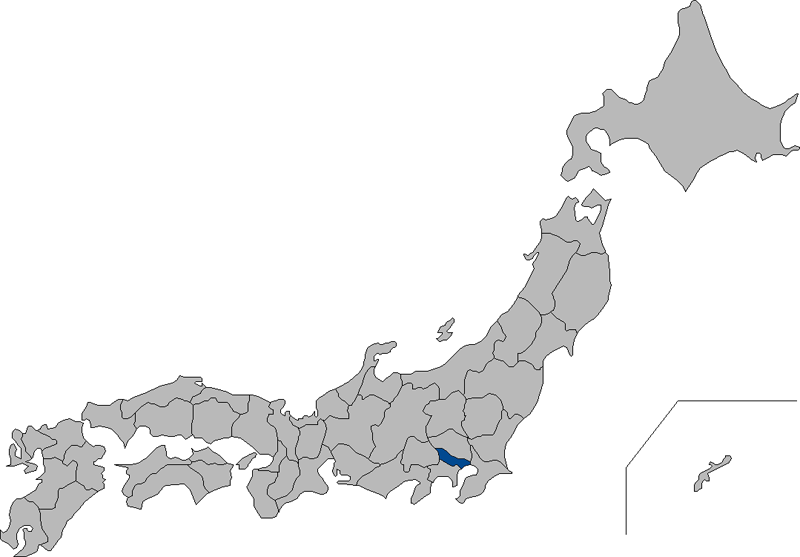

Tohto University Baseball League (東都大学野球連盟, Tōto daigaku yakyū renmei) is an intercollegiate baseball league that features 21 prominent universities in the Tokyo area.

== History ==
Tohto University Baseball League was established in April 1931 and the first relegation matches were played in 1936 between the top two divisions. The league title team has recorded 21 championships in All Japan University Baseball Championship Series. It is the most championships in the university baseball league in Japan.

== Members (Autumn 2014) ==
=== Division 1 ===
Aoyama Gakuin University

- Affiliation:1951
- League Championships in Division1: 12
- All-Time Record in Division1: 429-382-27
- Last Championship: Spring 2006

Asia University

- Affiliation:1959
- League Championships in Division1: 23
- All-Time Record in Division1: 653-535-33
- Last Championship: Spring 2014

Chuo University

- Affiliation:1930
- League Championships in Division1: 24
- All-Time Record in Division1: 789-622-64
- Last Championship: Autumn 2004

Kokugakuin University

- Affiliation:1930
- League Championships in Division1: 1
- All-Time Record in Division1: 182-341-12
- Last Championship: Autumn 2010

Komazawa University

- Affiliation:1948
- League Championships in Division1: 26
- All-Time Record in Division1: 815-692-51
- Last Championship: Autumn 2001

Takushoku University

- Affiliation:1949
- League Championships in Division1: 0
- All-Time Record in Division1: 14-11-0

=== Division 2 ===
Kokushikan University

- Affiliation:1959
- League Championships in Division1: 1
- All-Time Record in Division1: 62-130-7
- Last Championship: Autumn 1979

Nihon University

- Affiliation:1930
- League Championships in Division1: 22
- All-Time Record in Division1: 757-673-52
- Last Championship: Spring 2004

Rissho University

- Affiliation:1959
- League Championships in Division1: 1
- All-Time Record in Division1: 76-130-4
- Last Championship: Autumn 2009

Senshu University

- Affiliation:1930
- League Championships in Division1: 31
- All-Time Record in Division1: 699-498-38
- Last Championship: Spring 1989

Tokyo University of Agriculture

- Affiliation:1930
- League Championships in Division1: 0
- All-Time Record in Division1: 124-355-10

Toyo University

- Affiliation:1940
- League Championships in Division1: 16
- All-Time Record in Division1: 557-557-27
- Last Championship: Spring 2011

=== Division 3 ===
Gakushuin University

- Affiliation:1950
- League Championships in Division1:1
- All-Time Record in Division1: 66-131-11
- Last Championship: Autumn 1958

Juntendo University

- Affiliation:1958
- League Championships in Division1:0

Seikei University

- Affiliation:1951
- League Championships in Division1:0

Shibaura Institute of Technology

- Affiliation:1951
- League Championships in Division1:3
- All-Time Record in Division1: 145-174-11
- Last Championship: Spring 1970

Sophia University

- Affiliation:1940
- League Championships in Division1:0

Taisho University

- Affiliation:1948
- League Championships in Division1:0

=== Division 4 ===
Hitotsubashi University

- Affiliation:1935
- League Championships in Division1:0
- All-Time Record in Division1: 17-95-2

Tokyo City University

- Affiliation:1951
- League Championships in Division1:0

Tokyo Institute of Technology

- Affiliation:1946
- League Championships in Division1:0
- All-Time Record in Division1: 13-49-0

== Notable alumni ==
Aoyama Gakuin University

- Tadahito Iguchi (1997- Fukuoka Daiei Hawks→Chicago White Sox)
- Tokitaka Minamibuchi (1990–2000 Chiba Lotte Marines→Chunichi Dragons→Orix Bluewave)
- Tomochika Tsuboi (1998- Hanshin Tigers→Nippon Ham Fighters)
- Hidetaka Kawagoe (1999- Orix Bluewave, Orix Buffaloes)
- Hiroki Kokubo (1994- Fukuoka Daiei Hawks→Yomiuri Giants→Fukuoka SoftBank Hawks)
- Hiroshi Narahara (1990–2006 Seibu Lions→Nippon Ham Fighters→Chunichi Dragons)
- Hiroshi Ogawa (1985–1992 Lotte Orions)
- Yosuke Takasu (1998- Kintetsu Buffaloes→Rakuten Eagles)

Asia University

- Daijiro Oishi (1981–1997 Kintetsu Buffaloes、2008–2009 Manager of Orix BlueWave)
- Hideo Koike (1993–2005 Kintetsu Buffaloes→Chunichi Dragons etc.)
- Hideyuki Awano (1987–2000 Kintetsu Buffaloes→Yomiuri Giants→Yokohama BayStars)
- Hirokazu Ibata (1998- Chunichi Dragons)
- Norihiro Akahoshi (2001- Hanshin Tigers)
- Shingo Takatsu (1991- Yakult Swallows→Chicago White Sox→Tokyo Yakult Swallows)
- Tetsuro Kawajiri (1995–2005 Hanshin Tigers→Osaka Kintetsu Buffaloes etc.)
- Tsuyoshi Yoda (1990–2000 Chunichi Dragons→Chiba Lotte Marines→Nippon Ham Fighters)
- Yusaku Iriki (1997–2008 Yomiuri Giants→Hokkaido Nippon Ham Fighters etc.)
- Yutaka Ohashi (1969–1982 Toei Flyers→Hankyu Braves)

Chuo University

- Yoshio Anabuki (1956–1968 Nankai Hawks、1983–1985 Manager of Nankai Hawks)
- Shiro Mizunuma (1969–1983 Hiroshima Toyo Carp→Chunichi Dragons)
- Shiro Takegami (1967–1975 Sankei Atoms、1980–1984 Manager of Yakult Swallows)
- Toshimitsu Suetsugu (1965–1977 Yomiuri Giants)
- Yutaka Takagi (1981–1994 Yokohama Taiyo Whales→Nippon Ham Fighters)
- Junji Ogawa (1982–1994 Yakult Swallows、2011- Manager of Tokyo Yakult Swallows)
- Shinnosuke Abe (2001- Yomiuri Giants)
- Yoshiyuki Kamei (2005- Yomiuri Giants)
- Yushi Aida (2006- Yomiuri Giants)
- Hirokazu Sawamura (2011- Yomiuri Giants)

Hitotsubashi University

- Takashi Kawamura (politician)

Kokugakuin University

- Shunsuke Watanabe (2001- Chiba Lotte Marines)

Kokushikan University

- Hiroshi Nagadomi (1986–2005 Hiroshima Toyo Carp→Nippon Ham Fighters→Fukuoka Daiei Hawks)
- Shigeyuki Furuki (2002- Nippon Ham Fighters→Yomiuri Giants)

Komazawa University

- Akihiko Ohya (1970–1985 Yakult Swallows, 1996–1997, 2007 Manager of Yokohama BayStars)
- Hisanori Takahashi (2000- Yomiuri Giants)
- Hiromichi Ishige (1981–1996 Seibu Lions→Fukuoka SoftBank Hawks)
- Kenjiro Nomura (1989–2006 Hiroshima Toyo Carp、2010- Manager of Hiroshima Toyo Carp)
- Koichi Sekikawa (1991–2007 Hanshin Tigers→Chunichi Dragons→Rakuten Eagles)
- Kiyoshi Nakahata (1977–1989 Yomiuri Giants)
- Shota Imanaga (2016- Yokohama DeNA Baystars→Chicago Cubs)
- Takahiro Arai (1999- Hiroshima Toyo Carp→Hanshin Tigers)
- Tsuyoshi Oshita (1967–1978 Nippon Ham Fighters→Hiroshima Toyo Carp)

Nihon University

- Eiji Ochiai (1992–2006 Chunichi Dragons)
- Hirotoshi Kitagawa (1995- Hanshin Tigers→Kintetsu Buffaloes→Orix Buffaloes)
- Kenjiro Tamiya (1949–1963 Hanshin Tigers→Mainichi Orions)
- Mitsuru Manaka (1993–2008 Yakult Swallows)
- Naoyuki Shimizu (2000- Chiba Lotte Marines)
- Shuichi Murata (2003- Yokohama BayStars)
- Takehiko Bessho (1942–1961 Nankai Hawks→Yomiuri Giants)
- Yoshinori Sato (1977–1998 Hankyu Braves, Orix BlueWave)
- Yukinori Miyata (1962–1969 Yomiuri Giants)
- Yutaka Wada (1985–2002 Hanshin Tigers)

Rissho University

- Fumiya Nishiguchi (1995- Seibu Lions)

Senshu University

- Hiroki Kuroda (1997- Hiroshima Toyo Carp)
- Kento Sugiyama (1993–2001 Seibu Lions→Hanshin Tigers→Yokohama BayStars)
- Takayoshi Nakao (1981–1993 Chunichi Dragons→Yomiuri Giants etc.)
- Takeshi Koba (1958–1971 Hiroshima Toyo Carpetc、1975–1985 Manager of Hiroshima Toyo Carp、1987–1989 Manager of Taiyo Whales)
- Yoichi Okabayashi (1991–2000 Yakult Swallows)

Shibaura Institute of Technology

- Haruki Ihara (1971–1980 Nishitetsu Lionsetc、2002–2003 Manager of Seibu Lions、2004 Manager of Orix BlueWave)

Takushoku University

- Ken Takahashi (1995- Hiroshima Toyo Carp)

Tokyo University of Agriculture

- Shinsaku Katahira (1972–1989 Nankai Hawks→Seibu Lions etc.)
- Takehiro Hashimoto (1990–2003 Fukuoka Daiei Hawks→Seibu Lions etc.)
- Tsuneki Watanabe (2005- Rakuten Eagles)

Toyo University

- Hiromitsu Ochiai (1979–1998 Lotte Orions→Chunichi Dragons→Yomiuri Giants→Nippon Ham Fighters、2004- Manager of Chunichi Dragons)
- Mitsuo Tatsukawa (1978–1992 Hiroshima Toyo Carp、1999–2000 Manager of Hiroshima Toyo Carp)
- Makoto Imaoka (1997- Hanshin Tigers)
- Shinjiro Hiyama (1992- Hanshin Tigers)
- Shinobu Fukuhara (1999- Hanshin Tigers)
- Takayuki Shimizu (1996- Yomiuri Giants→2005- Seibu Lions)
- Toru Nimura (1984–1997 Chunichi Dragons→Chiba Lotte Marines)

== See also ==
- College baseball in Japan
- Tokyo Big Six Baseball League
