= 2001 Osaka Kintetsu Buffaloes season =

Professional Baseball season

2001 Osaka Kintetsu Buffaloes
- Pacific League champions
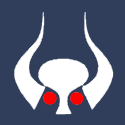
- League: Pacific League
- Ballpark: Osaka Dome
- Record: 78-58-6 (.567)
- League place: 1st
- Parent company: Kintetsu Railway
- Manager: Masataka Nashida

The 2001 Osaka Kintetsu Buffaloes season was the 51st season of the franchise in Nippon Professional Baseball, the team's 4th season at Osaka Dome, and the team's 51st season under Kintetsu Railway. This was also the team's second season under manager Masataka Nashida. For another year, the Buffaloes were led offensively by star tandem Norihiro Nakamura and Tuffy Rhodes. For the first time since 1989, the Buffaloes won the Pacific League pennant, and in stunning fashion, with Hirotoshi Kitagawa hitting a grand slam walk-off home run against the Orix BlueWave to secure the pennant. Had they lost, they still had to win a series against the Fukuoka Daiei Hawks to win the pennant. They however, would lose to the Yakult Swallows in the Japan Series in 5 games. This season would also be Kintetsu's last Pacific League pennant win.

== Regular season ==
The Buffaloes finished in first place, with a 78-58-6 record, with a .567 winning percentage.

Pacific League	G	W	L	T	Pct.	GB
Osaka Kintetsu Buffaloes	140	78	60	2	.565	-
Fukuoka Daiei Hawks	140	76	63	1	.547	2.5
Seibu Lions	140	73	67	0	.521	6.0
Orix BlueWave	140	70	66	4	.515	7.0
Chiba Lotte Marines	140	64	74	2	.464	14.0
Nippon-Ham Fighters	140	57	80	3	.416	20.5
