= Massimo Ciaramella =

Italian baseball player

Medal record

Men's baseball

Representing Italy

European Baseball Championship
Gold medal – first place	1991 Italy	National team
Silver medal – second place	1993 Sweden	National team
Silver medal – second place	1995 Netherlands	National team

Massimo Ciaramella (born 1 October 1970) is a retired Italian professional baseball infielder.

Born in Nettuno, Lazio, Ciaramella spent 16 seasons in the Italian Baseball League while playing for his local team Nettuno Baseball Club from 1986 to 2001, helping his team win championships in the 1990, 1993, 1996, 1998 and 2001 seasons.

In between, Ciaramella played in the Intercontinental Cup tournaments in 1991, 1993 and 1995, as well as in the European Baseball Championship in their 1991, 1993 and 1995 editions. In addition, he represented his country in the 1994 Baseball World Cup.

Overall, Ciaramella posted a .282/.357/.402 batting line in 642 career games, driving in 391 runs while scoring 442 times. As an infielder, he made 988 appearances at first base, 887 at shortstop, and 861 at third base.
