= Jim Stoeckel =

American baseball coach and scout

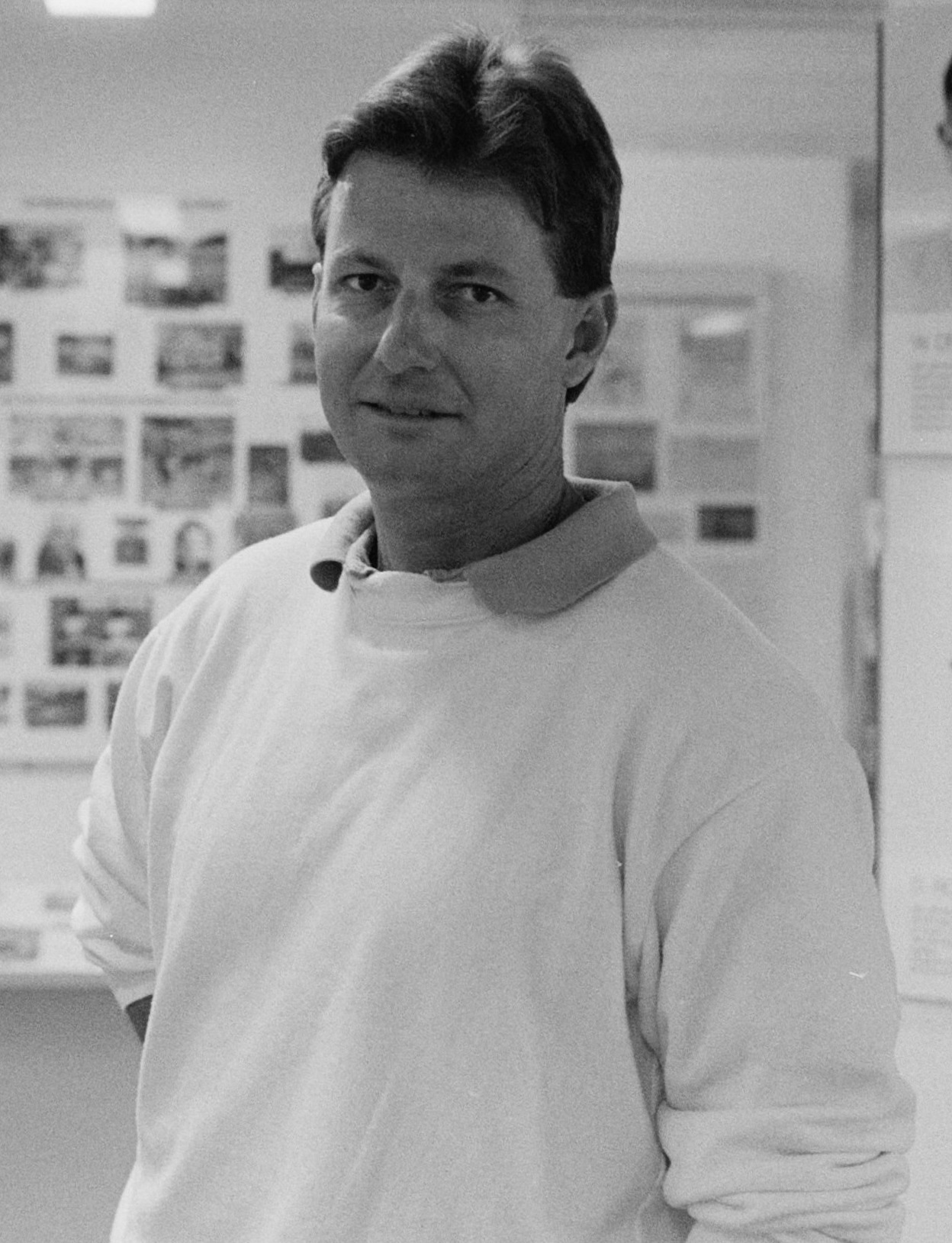
- Stoeckel in 1988
- Manager / coach
- Born: 1952 or 1953; North Tonawanda, New York
Medals
Manager for Netherlands
European Baseball Championship
Gold medal – first place	1981 Haarlem	National team
Silver medal – second place	1983 Grosseto	National team
Silver medal – second place	1989 Paris	National team
Silver medal – second place	1991 Nettuno	National team
Silver medal – second place	2010 Germany	National team

James A. Stoeckel (born 1952 or 1953) is a former baseball manager, coach, and scout. He was the head baseball coach of the Davidson Wildcats from 1988 to 1990 and Piedmont Lions in 2001. He managed the Netherlands national team in four separate stints from 1981 to 2011, also serving as a coach in 2009. He managed the France national team in 2012. He also worked as a scout and minor league coach for the Los Angeles Dodgers and Cincinnati Reds.

Stoeckel was also an all-Ivy League quarterback with the Harvard Crimson.

== Amateur playing career ==
Stoeckel attended Miami Killian High School in Miami, Florida, then Harvard University. He was the starting quarterback for the Crimson football team from 1971 to 1973. His first season ended early due to knee surgery in November. He was the school's first-ever Ivy League football player of the year in 1973, when he set several school passing records. He also won the 1973 Swede Nelson Award. He was an all-Ivy League punter in 1972. Stoeckel signed with the Hamilton Tiger-Cats of the Canadian Football League. He was on the team's roster in 1974 and 1975 but did not play in a game.

Stoeckel also played for the Crimson baseball team. He hit a home run off future Major League Baseball (MLB) pitcher Mike Flanagan out of Fenway Park in May 1973 to send Harvard to the College World Series. That season, he was named to the all-Eastern Intercollegiate Baseball League team. He was the captain of the team in 1974, thought he was ruled ineligible after signing a professional contract with the Tiger-Cats. Stoeckel was drafted by the Pittsburgh Pirates in the 37th round of the 1974 Major League Baseball draft but did not play professionally.

Stoeckel was inducted into the Harvard Varsity Club's Hall of Fame in 1997.

== Baseball coaching career ==
=== United States ===
Stoeckel coached baseball and football at St. Andrew's High School in Boca Raton, Florida, from 1977 to 1979. He then was an assistant baseball coach and assistant athletic director at Harvard from 1979 to 1981.

He began working for the Los Angeles Dodgers in 1981 at the team's spring training facility in Florida. From 1983 to 1987, he was a minor league coach. He was scheduled to manage the Great Falls Dodgers in 1987 but left the organization to become the head coach of the Davidson Wildcats in June, before the start of the Rookie-league season. In three years under Stoeckel, Davidson went 67–76–1. He recruited Dutch infielder Robert Eenhoorn, who later played in MLB.

Stoeckel returned to the Dodgers in 1990, working as a global scouting coordinator through 1998. He joined the Vero Beach Dodgers coaching staff that July and was the team's pitching coach in 1999. He signed Australian pitcher Luke Prokopec to the Dodgers.

Stoeckel then returned to college coaching. In 2001, he coached the Piedmont Lions, who went 15–25. He also was a pitching coach for Indian River Community College.

Stoeckel joined the Cincinnati Reds in late 2006 and was named director of international operations in 2007. His title later changed to coordinator of global scouting and director of global scouting. He remained with the Reds through 2017. As a scout, he signed Didi Gregorius, Jose Barrero, and Chadwick Tromp.

=== International ===
Stoeckel managed the Netherlands national team four separate times and also coached the team in international competitions. He first managed the team from 1981 to 1983, winning the 1981 European Championship and finishing second to Italy in the 1983 championship, losing out on a place in the 1984 Summer Olympics. He briefly returned to lead the team in a 1984 tournament in Taiwan. He returned to managed the Dutch from 1989 to 1991. He led the Dutch to their first World Port Tournament win in 1989. The Dutch again lost to Italy in the 1989 and 1991 European championships, failing to qualify for the 1992 Summer Olympics. He was the bullpen coach for the Netherlands in the 2009 World Baseball Classic. In early 2010, he returned to a managerial role, with the team finishing second in the Haarlem Baseball Week tournament and European championship, Stoeckel's fourth loss to Italy in the continental tournament. His last tournament with the Netherlands was the 2010 Intercontinental Cup, with another second-place finish. He left the team that November.

Stoeckel also was a coach for the Australia national team at the 1992 Haarlem Baseball Week. He managed the France national team at a World Baseball Classic qualifying tournament in 2012.

== Personal life ==
Stoeckel and his wife reside in Vero Beach, Florida. They have four children and nine grandchildren. Their son, Jeff, also played baseball at Harvard. Jeff also coached Paris Université Club in France's baseball league.
