= 2010 Haarlem Baseball Week =

Tournament details
- Country: Netherlands
- City: Haarlem
- Dates: 9–18 July
- Teams: 5

Final positions
- Champions: Netherlands (3rd title)
- Runners-up: Cuba
- Third place: Japan
- Fourth place: United States

Tournament statistics
- Games played: 20
- Attendance: 55,150 (2,758 per game)

Awards
- MVP: (Netherlands) Danny Rombley
- All statistics correct as of July 18, 2010.

The 2010 Haarlem Baseball Week was an international baseball competition held at the Pim Mulier Stadium in Haarlem, the Netherlands from July 9–18, 2010. It was the 25th edition of the tournament.

On July 17, the Netherlands won the tournament for the third time, by winning after 10 innings against Japan.

== Teams ==
Originally, Venezuela would appear for the first time at the Baseball Week, but due to problems getting visa for Puerto Rico, where the 2010 Central American and Caribbean Games were set to be held, the organization of the tournament had to withdraw the team.

Chinese Taipei^{1}	6th appearance
Cuba	12th appearance
Japan^{2}	11th appearance
Netherlands	Host nation
United States^{3}	6th appearance

^1 Chinese Taipei is the official IBAF designation for the team representing Taiwan.
^2 Japan was represented by an all-star team of the Keiji University Baseball League.
^3 The United States were represented by an all-star team of the National Junior College Athletic Association.

== Schedule and results ==
The schedule was changed three times due to the problems with the team from Venezuela. The organization of the tournament decided on July 10 to cancel the final round. The teams met each other two times and the winner was decided by win-loss record.

=== Standings ===
Teams	W	L	Pct.	GB	R	RA
Netherlands	7	1	.875	—	52	26
Cuba	6	2	.750	1	43	34
Japan	3	5	.375	4	36	39
United States	2	6	.250	5	30	53
Chinese Taipei	2	6	.250	5	22	31
Source: "Program, score and statistics HHW 2010". Haarlemse Honkbalweek.

=== Schedule ===
July 9, 2010	United States	3 – 1	Chinese Taipei	Pim Mulier Stadium, Haarlem; Attendance: 1,000
July 9, 2010		Boxscore		Pim Mulier Stadium, Haarlem; Attendance: 1,000

July 9, 2010	Cuba	6 – 0	Japan	Pim Mulier Stadium, Haarlem; Attendance: 1,250
July 9, 2010		Boxscore		Pim Mulier Stadium, Haarlem; Attendance: 1,250

July 10, 2010	United States	2 – 4	Japan	Pim Mulier Stadium, Haarlem; Attendance: 1,250
July 10, 2010		Boxscore		Pim Mulier Stadium, Haarlem; Attendance: 1,250

July 10, 2010	Netherlands	1 – 0	Chinese Taipei	Pim Mulier Stadium, Haarlem; Attendance: 3,900
July 10, 2010		Boxscore		Pim Mulier Stadium, Haarlem; Attendance: 3,900

July 11, 2010	United States	4 – 7	Cuba	Pim Mulier Stadium, Haarlem; Attendance: 4,250
July 11, 2010		Boxscore		Pim Mulier Stadium, Haarlem; Attendance: 4,250

July 11, 2010	Japan	0 – 5	Netherlands	Pim Mulier Stadium, Haarlem; Attendance: 4,350
July 11, 2010		Boxscore		Pim Mulier Stadium, Haarlem; Attendance: 4,350

July 12, 2010	Chinese Taipei	6 – 9	Cuba	Pim Mulier Stadium, Haarlem; Attendance: 1,250
July 12, 2010		Boxscore		Pim Mulier Stadium, Haarlem; Attendance: 1,250

July 12, 2010	Netherlands	4 – 1	United States	Pim Mulier Stadium, Haarlem; Attendance: 1,500
July 12, 2010		Boxscore		Pim Mulier Stadium, Haarlem; Attendance: 1,500

July 13, 2010	Chinese Taipei	3 – 1	Japan	Pim Mulier Stadium, Haarlem; Attendance: 2,000
July 13, 2010		Boxscore		Pim Mulier Stadium, Haarlem; Attendance: 2,000

July 13, 2010	Netherlands	10 – 0 (F/7)	Cuba	Pim Mulier Stadium, Haarlem; Attendance: 4,500
July 13, 2010		Boxscore		Pim Mulier Stadium, Haarlem; Attendance: 4,500

July 14, 2010	Japan	4 – 2	Cuba	Pim Mulier Stadium, Haarlem; Attendance: 2,200
July 14, 2010		Boxscore		Pim Mulier Stadium, Haarlem; Attendance: 2,200

July 15, 2010	Cuba	3 – 2	Chinese Taipei	Pim Mulier Stadium, Haarlem; Attendance: 3,000
July 15, 2010		Boxscore		Pim Mulier Stadium, Haarlem; Attendance: 3,000

July 15, 2010	United States	4 – 12	Netherlands	Pim Mulier Stadium, Haarlem; Attendance: 4,800
July 15, 2010		Boxscore		Pim Mulier Stadium, Haarlem; Attendance: 4,800

July 16, 2010	Japan	2 – 5	Chinese Taipei	Pim Mulier Stadium, Haarlem; Attendance: 1,300
July 16, 2010		Boxscore		Pim Mulier Stadium, Haarlem; Attendance: 1,300

July 16, 2010	Cuba	4 – 3	United States	Pim Mulier Stadium, Haarlem; Attendance: 2,200
July 16, 2010		Boxscore		Pim Mulier Stadium, Haarlem; Attendance: 2,200

July 16, 2010	Chinese Taipei	0 – 5	Netherlands	Pim Mulier Stadium, Haarlem; Attendance: 4,100
July 16, 2010		Boxscore		Pim Mulier Stadium, Haarlem; Attendance: 4,100

July 17, 2010	Chinese Taipei	5 – 7	United States	Pim Mulier Stadium, Haarlem; Attendance: 2,300
July 17, 2010		Boxscore		Pim Mulier Stadium, Haarlem; Attendance: 2,300

July 17, 2010	Netherlands	10 – 9 (F/10)	Japan	Pim Mulier Stadium, Haarlem; Attendance: 3,200
July 17, 2010		Boxscore		Pim Mulier Stadium, Haarlem; Attendance: 3,200

July 18, 2010	Japan	16 – 6 (F/8)	United States	Pim Mulier Stadium, Haarlem; Attendance: 2,300
July 18, 2010		Boxscore		Pim Mulier Stadium, Haarlem; Attendance: 2,300

July 18, 2010	Cuba	12 – 5	Netherlands	Pim Mulier Stadium, Haarlem; Attendance: 4,500
July 18, 2010		Boxscore		Pim Mulier Stadium, Haarlem; Attendance: 4,500

== Final standings ==
Rk	Team
1	Netherlands
2	Cuba
3	Japan
4	United States
5	Chinese Taipei

2010 Haarlem Baseball Week champions

Netherlands
3rd title

== Tournament awards ==
Best Pitcher	(Netherlands) Diegomar Markwell (0.00 ERA in 11 innings)
Best Hitter	(Chinese Taipei) Po-Ting Hsiao (.500)
Best Defensive Player	(Japan) Koki Uchiyama (27 putouts, 19 assists, 0 errors)
Homerun King	(United States) Jared Womack (1 in 22 times at bat)
Most Valuable Player	(Netherlands) Danny Rombley (11 hits, 7 RBIs)
Most Popular Player	(Japan) Mitsuo Takahashi
Press Award	(Netherlands) Jim Stoeckel
Source: "Danny Rombley most valuable player". Haarlemse Honkbalweek.
