= Koichi Sekikawa =

Japanese baseball player & coach (born 1969)

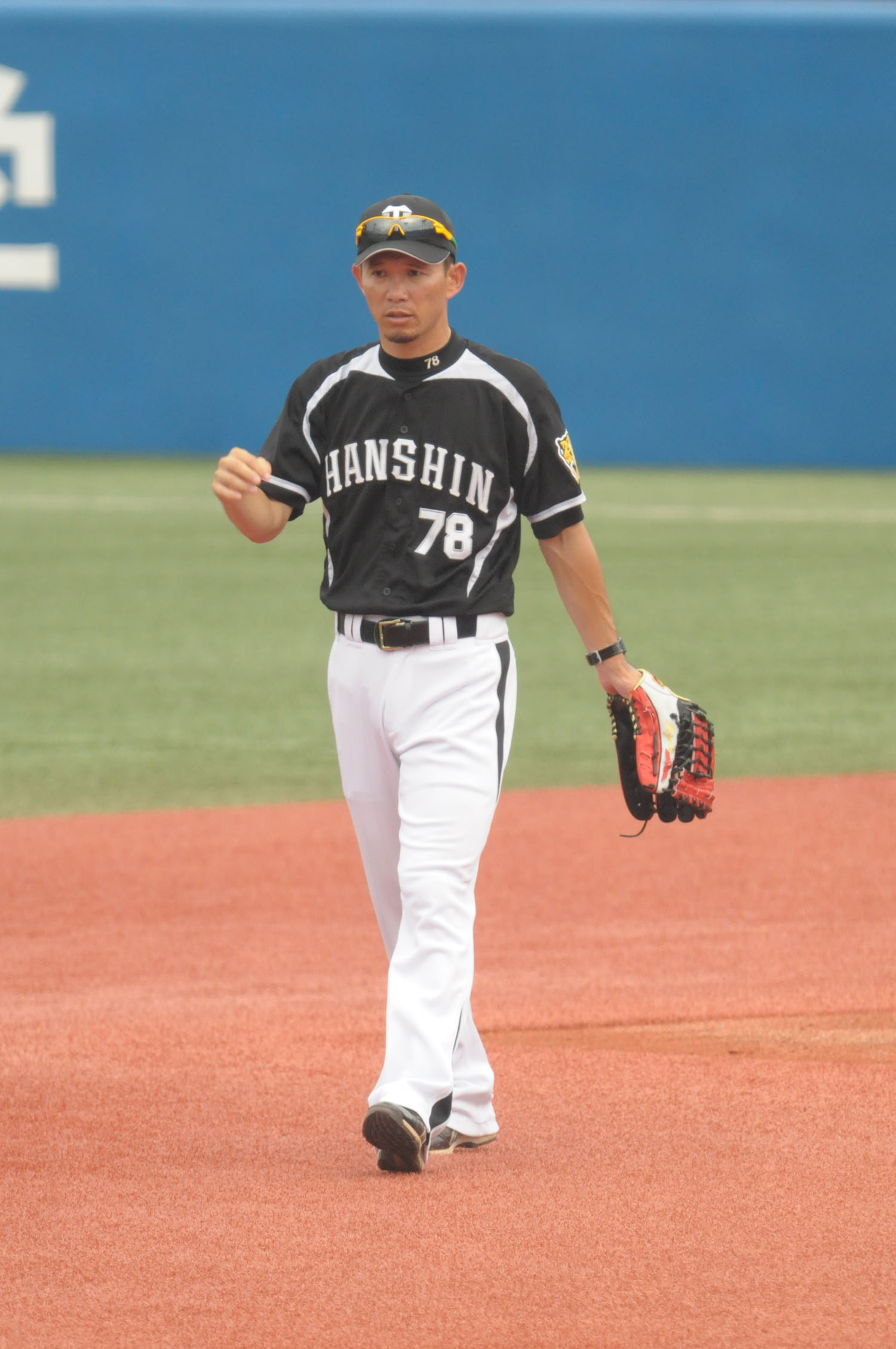
- Sekikawa with the Hanshin Tigers.

Fukuoka SoftBank Hawks – No. 019
- Outfielder / Catcher / Coach
- Born: April 1, 1969 (age 57); Chōfu, Tokyo, Japan
- Batted: Left Threw: Right

NPB debut
- July 31, 1991, for the Hanshin Tigers

Last NPB appearance
- October 4, 2007, for the Tohoku Rakuten Golden Eagles

NPB statistics
- Batting average: .286
- Home runs: 24
- Hits: 1129
- Stats at Baseball Reference

Teams
- As player: Hanshin Tigers (1991–1997); Chunichi Dragons (1998–2004); Tohoku Rakuten Golden Eagles (2005–2007); As coach: Tohoku Rakuten Golden Eagles (2008–2009, 2011); SK Wyverns (2010); Hanshin Tigers (2012–2015); Fukuoka SoftBank Hawks (2016, 2018–present)

Career highlights and awards
- As player: 2× NPB All-Star (1995, 1999); Best Nine Award (1999); As coach: Japan Series champion (2025)
Medals
Men's baseball
Representing Japan
Goodwill Games
Silver medal – second place	1990 Seattle	Team
- Last updated on: 10 December 2023

Koichi Sekikawa (関川 浩一, Sekikawa Kōichi; born April 1, 1969) is a Japanese former professional baseball catcher, outfielder, and current field player coordinator for the Fukuoka SoftBank Hawks of Nippon Professional Baseball (NPB).

He previously played for the Hanshin Tigers, the Chunichi Dragons, and the Tohoku Rakuten Golden Eagles.

== Early baseball career ==
Sekikawa went on to Toin Gakuen High School and participated in 66rd Japanese High School Baseball Championship in the summer of his first year.

He also entered Komazawa University, and twice won the Best Nine Award of the Tohto University Baseball League.

== Professional career ==
=== Active player era ===
==== Hanshin Tigers ====
On November 24, 1990, Sekikawa was drafted second round pick by the Hanshin Tigers in the 1990 Nippon Professional Baseball draft.

In the 1993 season, Sekikawa appeared in 89 games and became a regular catcher, and was the team's most played catcher until the 1995 season. And he participated the All-Star Game for the first time in SANYO All-Star Game 1995.

Sekikawa played eight seasons with the Tigers, but in the off-season of the 1997 season, he and Teruyoshi Kuji were traded to the Chunichi Dragons exchange to Yasuaki Taiho and Akihiro Yano.

==== Chunichi Dragons ====
In 1998 season, Sekigawa finished the regular season in 125 games with a batting average of .285, a one home runs, and a RBI of 36.

In 1999 season, He played in all 135 games of the season, setting career highs with a batting average of .330, a four home runs, a 20 stolen bases, and 60 RBIs, contributing to the team's Central League championship. And he participated the All-Star Game for the second time in SANYO All-Star Game 1999. He also won the Central League Best Nine Award.

Sekikawa played seven seasons with the Dragons, but in the off-season of the 2004 season, he and Shinichiro Koyama were traded to the Tohoku Rakuten Golden Eagles.

==== Tohoku Rakuten Golden Eagles ====
In 2005 season, Sekikawa finished the regular season in 101 games with a batting average of .287, a 7 stolen bases, and a RBI of 12.

He played three seasons with the Eagles before announcing his retirement during the 2007 off-season.

Sekikawa played 17seasons, appearing in 1,408 games and a batting average of .286, a 1,129 hits, a 24 home runs, a RBI of 324, a 91 stolen bases, and a 101 sacrifice bunts.

=== After retirement ===
After his retirement, Sekikawa was appointed as the first squad assistant hitting coach of the Tohoku Rakuten Golden Eagles since 2007 season.

He served as the SK Wyverns's hitting coach during the 2010 season.

Sekikawa again served as the outfield defense and base running coach for the Tohoku Rakuten Golden Eagles in the 2011 season.

Sekikawa became the first squad outfield defense and base running coach for the Hanshin Tigers in the 2012 season, and served as their the first squad hitting coach from the 2013 season.

On November 9, 2015, Sekikawa was appointed as the first squad field player general itinerant coach of the Fukuoka SoftBank Hawks.

He served as the third squad manager in the 2018 season, the first squad hitting coach in the 2019 season, the third squad hitting and outfield defense base running coach in the 2020-2021 season, and the second squad hitting coach in the 2022 season.

Sekikawa was transferred to the field player coordinator since the 2023 season.
