= Yoshitaka Mizuo =

Japanese baseball player

Yoshitaka Mizuo 水尾嘉孝
- Pitcher
- Born: May 2, 1968 (age 58); Kashihara, Nara, Japan
- Batted: Left Threw: Left

NPB debut
- May 9, 1992, for the Yokohama Taiyo Whales

Last NPB appearance
- 2003, for the Seibu Lions

NPB statistics
- Win–loss record: 7–9
- Earned run average: 3.43
- Stats at Baseball Reference

Teams
- Yokohama Taiyo Whales / Yokohama BayStars (1992–1994); Orix BlueWave (1995–2000); Seibu Lions (2001–2003)
Medals
Men's baseball
Representing Japan
Goodwill Games
Silver medal – second place	1990 Seattle	Team

Yoshitaka Mizuo (水尾 嘉孝, Mizuo Yoshitaka; born May 2, 1968, in Toyonaka, Osaka) is a former Japanese baseball player. He played professionally for the Yokohama BayStars and the Orix BlueWave. From 2003 to 2004, Mizuo played for minor league affiliates of Major League Baseball's Anaheim Angels.
