= Baseball at the 1990 Goodwill Games =

Tournament details
- Country: United States
- Dates: July 26–31
- Teams: 8

Final positions
- Champions: Cuba
- Runner-up: Japan
- Third place: United States
- Fourth place: Canada

Baseball was featured at the 1990 Goodwill Games. The tournament was contested from July 26 to 31 between eight national teams: hosts United States, Canada, Chinese Taipei, Cuba, Japan, Mexico, Puerto Rico and the Soviet Union. All the games were played at Cheney Stadium in Tacoma. This tournament marked the Soviet Union baseball team's first appearance in an international competition.

Cuba won the gold medal by defeating Japan in the final, while the United States secured the bronze after defeating Canada. Puerto Rico finished fifth, followed by Chinese Taipei in sixth, Mexico in seventh, and the Soviet Union in eighth.

This was the first and only occasion that baseball was included in the Goodwill Games program.

== Venue ==
(United States) Tacoma	Baseball at the 1990 Goodwill Games is located in the United States
Cheney Stadium	Baseball at the 1990 Goodwill Games is located in the United States
Capacity: 8,027	Baseball at the 1990 Goodwill Games is located in the United States

== Medalists ==
Event	Gold	Silver	Bronze
Men's tournament	Cuba; Omar Ajete; Luis Casanova; Osvaldo Fernández; Lourdes Gourriel; Alberto Hernández; Orlando Hernández; Orestes Kindelán; Omar Linares; Javier Méndez; Germán Mesa; Víctor Mesa; Antonio Pacheco; Juan Padilla; Pedro Rodríguez; Euclides Rojas; Reynaldo Santana; Luis Ulacia; Ermidelio Urrutia; Jorge Luis Valdés; Lázaro Valle Manager: Servio Borges	Japan; Chihiro Hamana; Shigetoshi Hasegawa; Shigeo Kajita; Shinichiro Kawabata; Hideo Koike; Kojiri Machidam; Kengo Makamura; Kazuhiko Miyakawa; Yoshitaka Mizuo; Kazuki Mochiyama; Hiroshi Narahara; Eiji Ochiai; Shinichi Okumura; Katsuhito Osaka; Kazuya Saito; Koichi Sekikawa; Terunobu Seto; Shingo Takatsu; Akihiro Yano; Takayuki Yokoi Manager: Toshio Uchida	United States; Jim Austin; Doug Bennett; Darren Bragg; Roger Burnett; Paul Byrd; Joe Ciccarella; Jorge Fábregas; Brent Gates; Chris Gomez; Joey Hamilton; Scott Hatteberg; Mike Hostetler; Damon Mashore; David McCarty; Darrin Paxton; Aaron Sele; Jo Jo Smith; Phil Stidham; Troy Tallman; Pookie Wilson Manager: Jim Morris

== Round robin ==
=== Group A ===
Pos	Team	Pld	W	L	RF	RA	RD	PCT	GB	Qualification
1	Cuba	3	3	0	31	11	+20	1.000	—	Advance to Semifinals
2	Canada	3	2	1	24	28	−4	.667	1	Advance to Semifinals
3	Puerto Rico	3	1	2	18	17	+1	.333	2	Advance to Classification games
4	Chinese Taipei	3	0	3	16	33	−17	.000	3	Advance to Classification games

Source: Goodwill Games

==== Results ====
July 27, 1990; 9:00 am (UTC–7)	Puerto Rico	4 – 6	Canada	Cheney Stadium, Tacoma

July 27, 1990; 6:00 pm (UTC–7)	Chinese Taipei	1 – 11	Cuba	Cheney Stadium, Tacoma

July 28, 1990; 5:30 pm (UTC–7)	Cuba	6 – 3	Puerto Rico	Cheney Stadium, Tacoma

July 28, 1990; 9:00 pm (UTC–7)	Canada	11 – 10	Chinese Taipei	Cheney Stadium, Tacoma

July 29, 1990; 5:30 pm (UTC–7)	Puerto Rico	11 – 5	Chinese Taipei	Cheney Stadium, Tacoma

July 29, 1990; 9:00 pm (UTC–7)	Cuba	14 – 7	Canada	Cheney Stadium, Tacoma

=== Group B ===
Pos	Team	Pld	W	L	RF	RA	RD	PCT	GB	Qualification
1	Japan	3	3	0	32	10	+22	1.000	—	Advance to Semifinals
2	United States (H)	3	2	1	38	9	+29	.667	1	Advance to Semifinals
3	Mexico	3	1	2	15	27	−12	.333	2	Advance to Classification games
4	Soviet Union	3	0	3	1	40	−39	.000	3	Advance to Classification games

Source: Goodwill Games
(H) Hosts

==== Results ====
July 26, 1990; 5:30 pm (UTC–7)	Soviet Union	0 – 17 (F/7)	United States	Cheney Stadium, Tacoma

July 27, 1990; 12:30 pm (UTC–7)	Japan	11 – 4	Mexico	Cheney Stadium, Tacoma

July 28, 1990; 9:00 am (UTC–7)	Soviet Union	1 – 9	Mexico	Cheney Stadium, Tacoma

July 28, 1990; 12:30 pm (UTC–7)	United States	6 – 7	Japan	Cheney Stadium, Tacoma

July 29, 1990; 9:00 am (UTC–7)	Japan	14 – 0	Soviet Union	Cheney Stadium, Tacoma

July 29, 1990; 12:15 (UTC–7)	Mexico	2 – 15 (F/7)	United States	Cheney Stadium, Tacoma

== Knockout stage ==
Semifinals
Cuba	16
United States	2
Japan	15
Canada	8

Gold medal game
Cuba	6
Japan	1
Bronze medal game
United States	10
Canada	4

Classification
Puerto Rico	13
Soviet Union	0
Mexico	7
Chinese Taipei	9

Fifth place
Puerto Rico	10
Chinese Taipei	7
Seventh place
Soviet Union	4
Mexico	14

== Final standings ==
Pos	Team	W	L
Gold medal	Cuba	5	0
Silver medal	Japan	4	1
Bronze medal	United States	3	2
4	Canada	2	3
5	Puerto Rico	3	2
6	Chinese Taipei	1	4
7	Mexico	2	3
8	Soviet Union	0	5
