= 1981 European Baseball Championship =

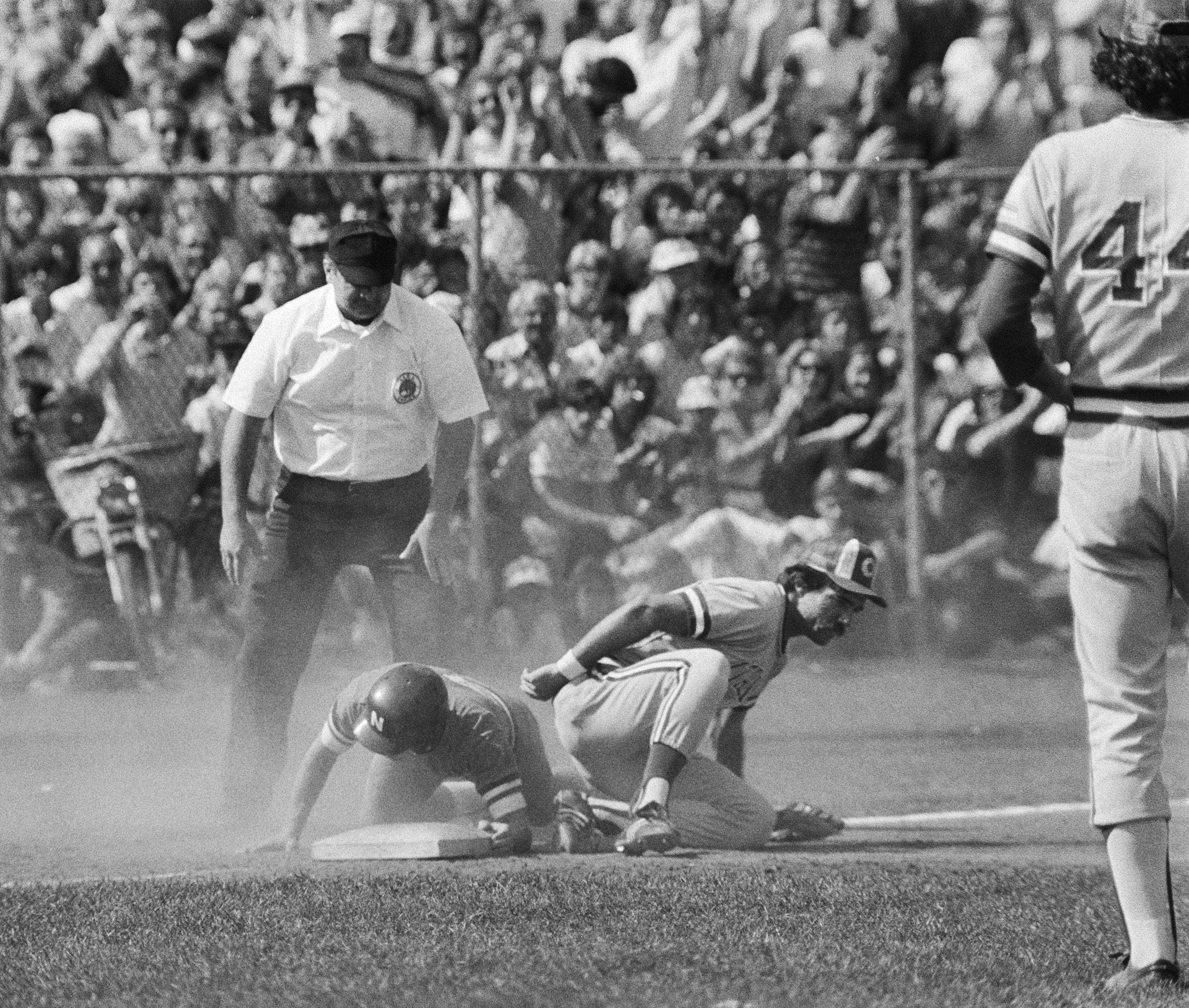
- A Netherlands runner reaches base during a championship game against Italy

Tournament details
- Country: The Netherlands
- City: Haarlem
- Dates: 11–19 July
- Teams: 4
- Defending champions: Italy

Final positions
- Champions: Netherlands
- Runners-up: Italy
- Third place: Sweden
- Fourth place: Belgium

Tournament statistics
- Games played: 17
- Best BA: (Netherlands) Charles Urbanus Jr. (.522)
- Most HRs: (Italy) Mike Romano (3)

Awards
- MVP: (Netherlands) Paul Smit

The 1981 European Baseball Championship was held at Pim Mulier Stadium in Haarlem, the Netherlands and was won by the Netherlands. Italy finished second. Sweden finished third, winning its first medal in the competition. The championship had four teams for the second consecutive tournament.

Jim Stoeckel, a coach for Harvard University, managed the Dutch team and was named the best coach of the tournament. Prince Claus of the Netherlands attended the opening ceremonies. More than 40,000 spectators attended the tournament.

== Standings ==
Pos.	Team	Record
1	Netherlands	8–0
2	Italy	4–4
3	Sweden	3–5
4	Belgium	2–6

== Awards ==
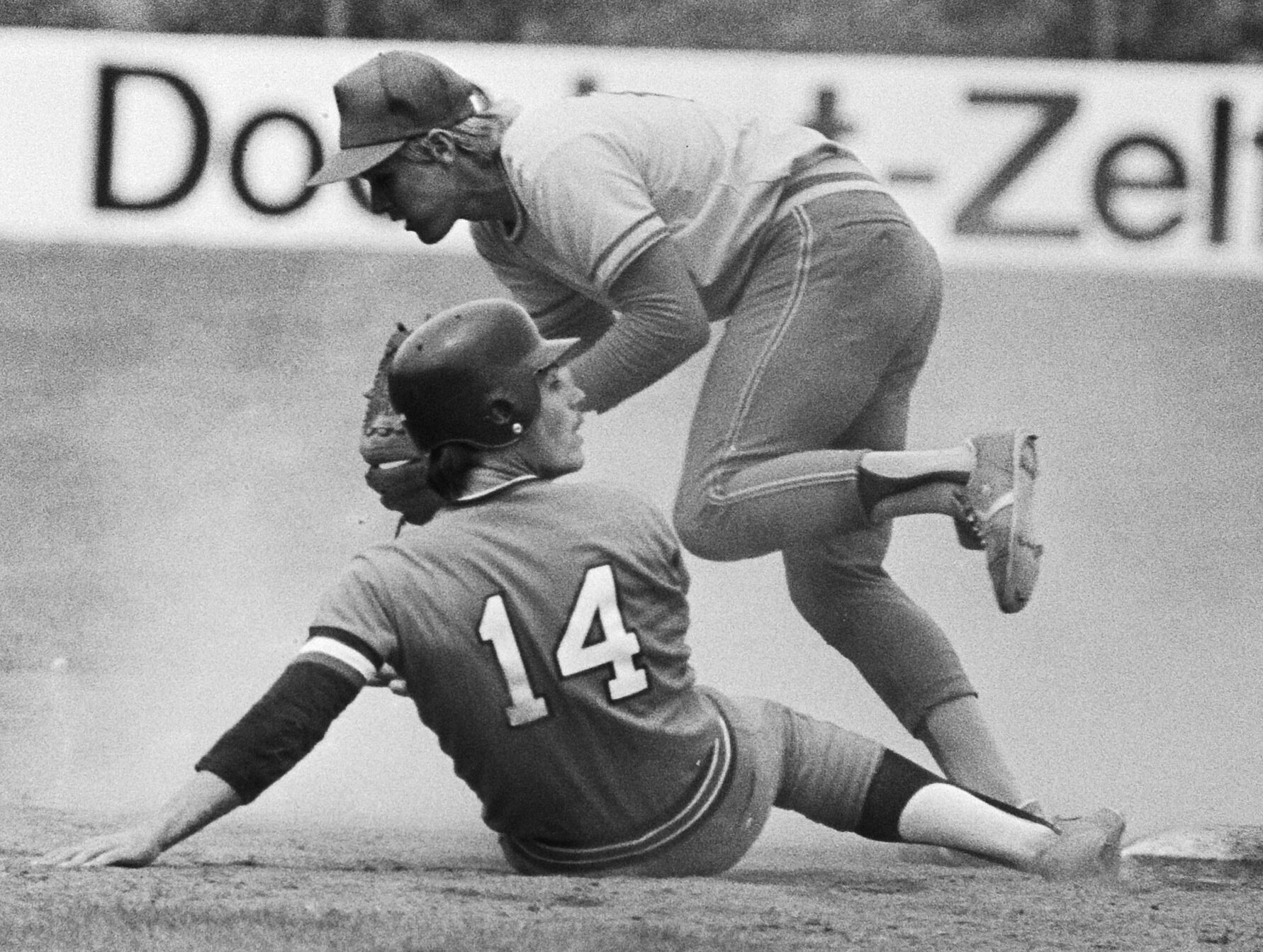
Charles Urbanus Jr. (number 14) was named the best hitter of the tournament

- Most valuable player: (Netherlands) Paul Smit
- Best hitter: (Netherlands) Charles Urbanus Jr., .522 batting average
- Best pitcher: (Netherlands) Jan Hijzelendoorn
- Most home runs: (Italy) Mike Romano, 3
- Best coach: (Netherlands) Jim Stoeckel
- Most popular player: (Netherlands) Eddy Tromp
- Most spectacular player: (Netherlands) Jim Sieval
- Most unlucky player: (Belgium) Frank Lauwers, who broke two fingers after getting hit by a ball
