= Soviet Union national baseball team =

Information
- Country: Soviet Union
- Federation: Baseball, Softball and Lapta Federation of the Soviet Union
- Confederation: Confederation of European Baseball
- Manager: Vladimir Bogatyrev

Uniforms
Home	Away

Intercontinental Cup
- Appearances: 1 (first in 1991)
- Best result: 9th (1991)

European Championship
- Appearances: 1 (first in 1991)
- Best result: 6th (1991)

The Soviet Union national baseball team represented the Soviet Union in international baseball competitions. The team was established in 1987 and was disbanded after the dissolution of the Soviet Union in December 1991.

During its brief existence, the team participated in only three major international tournaments: the 1990 Goodwill Games, where it finished eighth, the 1991 Intercontinental Cup, where it placed ninth, and the 1991 European Baseball Championship, where it finished sixth.

== History ==
Baseball was first introduced to the Soviet Union in the 1930s by migrants from the United States and Europe. However, the sport was officially recognized in 1987 with the establishment of the Baseball, Softball and Lapta Federation of the Soviet Union. The Soviet Union national baseball team played its first unofficial game against Nicaragua on 15 August 1987 in Kyiv, losing 0–22. The following year, on 23 January 1988, the Soviet Union became a member of the Confederation of European Baseball (CEB) during the organization's congress in Paris.

The Soviet team competed in its first international tournament at the 1990 Goodwill Games, held in Seattle. The Soviet Union lost all of its games and scored only five runs. In the opening round, they lost 0–17 to the United States, 1–9 to Mexico and 0–14 to Japan. In the classification games, they lost 0–13 to Puerto Rico and once more to Mexico 4–14, finishing in last position.

In August 1990, the team went undefeated in Pool B of the European Baseball Championship, contested in Parma, securing its place at the 1991 European Baseball Championship. During the first round of the tournament, the Soviets defeated Czechoslovakia, Poland and Switzerland. The USSR then overcame Yugoslavia in the semifinals and Germany in the final, earning promotion to Pool A.

In July 1991, the USSR participated in the 1991 Intercontinental Cup, finishing in ninth place with a 1–8 record, earning its only victory against France. In the 1991 European Baseball Championship, contested in August, the USSR was placed in Group A, alongside hosts Italy, France and Sweden. The Soviet team lost all three of its opening round games. In the placement round, the team defeated Great Britain twice, Sweden once and won one game and lost one against Belgium, ultimately finishing in sixth place. This was the last competition the team participated in, as the Soviet Union dissolved in December of that year.

As with most sports, the World Baseball Softball Confederation recognizes Russia as the successor to the Soviet Union. Among the post-Soviet states, Estonia, Georgia, Lithuania, and Ukraine joined the Confederation of European Baseball in 1992, Moldova in 1993, and Armenia and Belarus in 1994.

== Roster ==
Soviet Union roster – 1990 Goodwill Games
Players		Coaches
Pitchers: (Russian Soviet Federative Socialist Republic) Alekansdr Buyanov; (Russian Soviet Federative Socialist Republic) Gherman Gulbit; (Georgian Soviet Socialist Republic) Koba Kavelashvili; (Ukrainian Soviet Socialist Republic) Viktor Kemen; (Russian Soviet Federative Socialist Republic) Leonid Komeyev; (Ukrainian Soviet Socialist Republic) Yury Neskoromny; (Russian Soviet Federative Socialist Republic) Timur Tritonenkov	Catchers: (Russian Soviet Federative Socialist Republic) Sergey Korolyov; (Russian Soviet Federative Socialist Republic) Vadim Kulakov; Infielders: (Russian Soviet Federative Socialist Republic) Ilya Bogatyrev; (Ukrainian Soviet Socialist Republic) Andrey Kuzich; (Russian Soviet Federative Socialist Republic) Ilya Onokov; (Georgian Soviet Socialist Republic) Nugzar Popkhadze; (Russian Soviet Federative Socialist Republic) Andrey Popov; (Russian Soviet Federative Socialist Republic) Yevgeny Puchkov; (Russian Soviet Federative Socialist Republic) Stepan Rubanov; Outfielders: (Russian Soviet Federative Socialist Republic) Aleksandr Krupenchekov; (Russian Soviet Federative Socialist Republic) Igor Makambitov; (Russian Soviet Federative Socialist Republic) Dmitry Shlyapnikov; (Russian Soviet Federative Socialist Republic) Sergey Zhigalov	Manager: (Soviet Union) Vladimir Bogatyrev; Coaches: (Soviet Union) Aleksandr Ardatov (coach); (Soviet Union) Andrey Borodin (coach); (United States) Rick Spooner (coach); (United States) Bunny Mick (coach); Roster

== Tournament record ==
=== Goodwill Games ===
Goodwill Games record
Year	Round	Position	W	L	RS	RA
(United States) 1990	Classification	8th	0	5	5	67
Total	1/1	–	0	5	5	67

=== Intercontinental Cup ===
Intercontinental Cup record
Year	Round	Position	W	L	RS	RA
(Spain) 1991	Preliminaries	9th	1	8	20	99
Total	1/1	–	1	8	20	99

=== European Championship ===
European Baseball Championship record							Qualification record			
Year	Round	Position	W	L	RS	RA	W	L	RS	RA
(Italy) 1991	Placement round	6th	4	4	58	51	5	0	73	14
Total	1/1	–	4	4	58	51	5	0	73	14

== Head-to-head record ==
Positive record Neutral record Negative record

Opponent	Pld	W	L	RS	RA	RD	Win %
Belgium	2	1	1	17	9	+8	50%
Czechoslovakia	1	1	0	12	6	+6	100%
Chinese Taipei	1	0	1	0	14	–14	0%
Cuba	1	0	1	1	11	–10	0%
France	2	1	1	21	16	+5	50%
Germany	1	1	0	8	1	+7	100%
Great Britain	2	2	0	21	10	+11	100%
Italy	2	0	2	5	25	–20	0%
Japan	2	0	2	0	40	–40	0%
Mexico	3	0	3	6	35	–29	0%
Nicaragua	1	0	1	1	7	–6	0%
Poland	1	1	0	29	3	+26	100%
Puerto Rico	1	0	1	0	13	–13	0%
South Korea	1	0	1	0	11	–11	0%
Spain	1	0	1	1	9	–8	0%
Sweden	2	1	1	10	11	–1	50%
Switzerland	1	1	0	9	1	+8	100%
United States	1	0	1	0	17	–17	0%
Yugoslavia	1	1	0	15	3	+12	100%
Total (19)	27	10	17	156	242	–86	37.04%

== See also ==
- Russia national baseball team
