= Hiroshi Narahara =

Japanese baseball player & coach (born 1968)

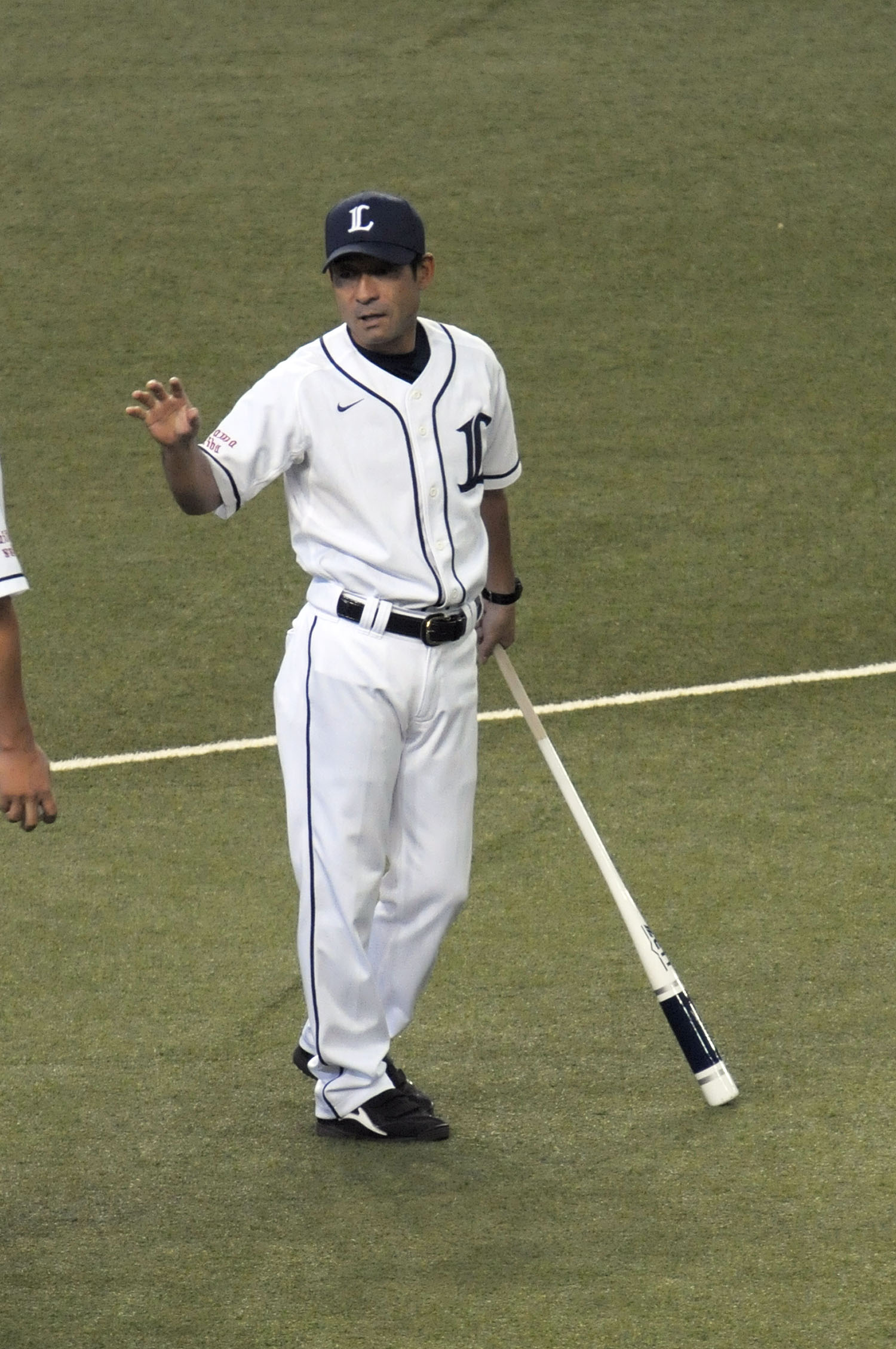
- Narahara with the Saitama Seibu Lions.

Fukuoka SoftBank Hawks – No. 92
- Infielder / Coach
- Born: May 16, 1968 (age 57); Minami-Saitama District, Saitama
- Batted: Right Threw: Right

NPB debut
- April 6, 1991, for the Seibu Lions

Last NPB appearance
- October 22, 2006, for the Chunichi Dragons

NPB statistics
- Batting average: .237
- Home runs: 13
- Runs batted in: 212
- Stats at Baseball Reference

Teams
- As player: Seibu Lions (1991–1997); Nippon-Ham Fighters/Hokkaido Nippon-Ham Fighters (1998–2006); Chunichi Dragons (2006); As coach: Chunichi Dragons (2007–2011); Saitama Seibu Lions (2012–2016); Chunichi Dragons (2017–2019); Tohoku Rakuten Golden Eagles (2020–2023); Fukuoka SoftBank Hawks (2024–present)

Career highlights and awards
- As coach: Japan Series champion (2025)
Medals
Men's baseball
Representing Japan
Goodwill Games
Silver medal – second place	1990 Seattle	Team

Hiroshi Narahara (奈良原 浩, Narahara Hiroshi; born May 16, 1968) is a Japanese former professional baseball infielder and current first squad head coach for the Fukuoka SoftBank Hawks of the Nippon Professional Baseball (NPB). He played in NPB for the Seibu Lions, Nippon-Ham Fighters/Hokkaido Nippon-Ham Fighters, and Chunichi Dragons.

After his retirement, Narahara was the infield defense and base running coach for the Chunichi Dragons during the 2007–2011 season.

He served as the Saitama Seibu Lions first squad and second squad the infield defense and base running coach from the 2012–2016 seasons.

He again served as the infield defense and base running coach for the Chunichi Dragons from 2017 to 2019 season.

On October 14, 2019, Narahara become second squad manager for the Tohoku Rakuten Golden Eagles and served through the 2023 season.

On October 31, 2023, Narahara became the first squad head coach of the Fukuoka SoftBank Hawks.
