= Hideo Koike =

Japanese baseball player

- Pitcher
- Born: March 18, 1969; Ichinomiya, Aichi, Japan
- Batted: Left Threw: Left

NPB debut
- April 11, 1993, for the Kintetsu Buffaloes

Last appearance
- September 28, 2005, for the Tohoku Rakuten Golden Eagles

NPB statistics (through 2005)
- Win–loss record: 51–47
- Earned run average: 4.40
- Strikeouts: 715
- Saves: 2

Teams
- Kintetsu Buffaloes / Osaka Kintetsu Buffaloes (1993–1999); Chunichi Dragons (2000–2001); Osaka Kintetsu Buffaloes (2002–2004); Tohoku Rakuten Golden Eagles (2005)

Career highlights and awards
- 1× Pacific League wins champion (1997); 1× NPB All-Star (1999)
Medals
Men's baseball
Representing Japan
Goodwill Games
Silver medal – second place	1990 Seattle	Team
- Last updated on: 9 May 2020

Hideo Koike (小池 秀郎, Koike Hideo; born June 30, 1969) is a Japanese former Nippon Professional Baseball pitcher.
