= 1991 European Baseball Championship =

Tournament details
- Country: Italy
- Dates: 2–11 August
- Teams: 8
- Defending champions: Italy

Final positions
- Champions: Italy (7th title)
- Runners-up: Netherlands
- Third place: Spain
- Fourth place: France

Tournament statistics
- Best BA: (Italy) Roberto Bianchi (.538)
- Most HRs: (Italy) Massimo Fochi

Awards
- MVP: (Italy) Guglielmo Trinci

The 1991 European Baseball Championship was held in Nettuno, Italy and was won by Italy, sweeping the Netherlands in a three-game championship series. Italy was undefeated as host and qualified for the 1992 Summer Olympics. The Soviet Union competed in its only European championship, winning four of its last five games. Great Britain, which lost all eight games, would not return to the tournament until 1997.

Dutch coach Jim Stoeckel resigned from the team after not qualifying for the Olympics. Dutch sportswriters said the Netherlands had one of their worst performances ever in the tournament.

== Standings ==
Pos.	Team	Record
1	Italy	8–0
2	Netherlands	4–4
3	Spain	5–3
4	France	3–5
5	Belgium	5–3
6	Soviet Union	4–4
7	Sweden	3–5
8	Great Britain	0–8

== Format ==
The eight teams in the tournament were split into two groups that competed in a round-robin format. The top two teams in each group then advanced to a semifinal round, playing the top two teams in the other group. The two best teams and two worst teams in the semifinal then matched up in a three-game series for the gold and bronze medals, respectively. The bottom two finishers in each initial group competed in another round-robin format to determine the final standings.

== Awards ==
- Most valuable player: (Italy) Guglielmo Trinci, batted .459 with 13 runs batted in
- Best batter: (Italy) Roberto Bianchi, .538 batting average
- Best pitcher: (Spain) Xavier Camps
- Most home runs: (Italy) Massimo Fochi
- Most runs batted in: (Italy) Elio Gambuti
