= Eiji Ochiai =

Japanese baseball player and coach

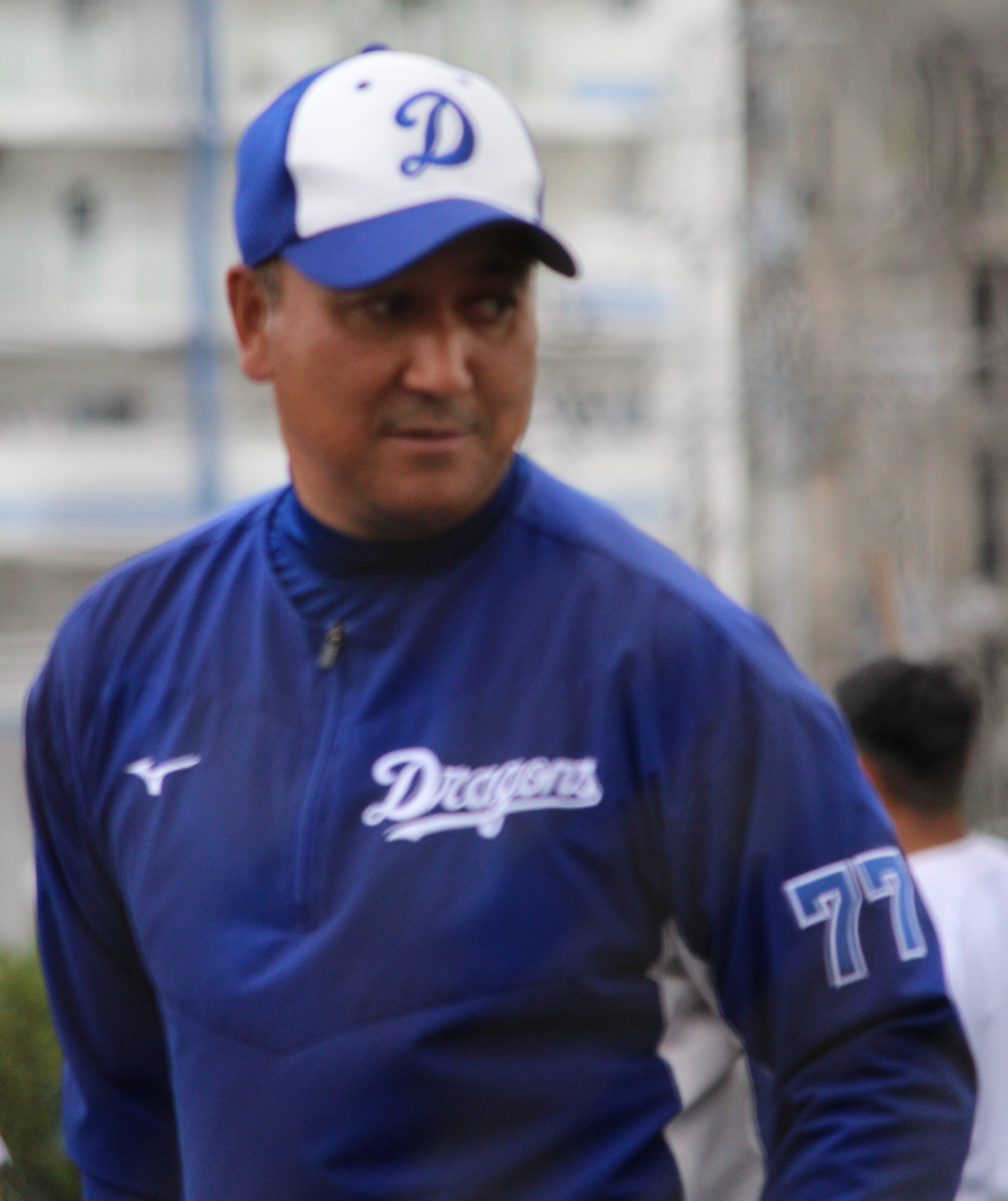
- Ochiai overlooking practice in Chatan, Sep 2022

Chunichi Dragons – No. 77
- Pitcher / Coach
- Born: July 25, 1969 (age 57); Ishibashi, Tochigi, Japan
- Batted: Right Threw: Right

NPB debut
- July 28, 1993, for the Chunichi Dragons

Last NPB appearance
- August 2, 2006, for the Chunichi Dragons

NPB statistics
- Win–loss record: 37-45
- Saves: 24
- ERA: 3.29
- Strikeouts: 393
- Stats at Baseball Reference

Teams
- As player: Chunichi Dragons (1992–2006); As coach: Samsung Lions (2010–2012); Chiba Lotte Marines (2015–2017); Samsung Lions (2018–2021); Chunichi Dragons (2022–Present)

Career highlights and awards
- 2× NPB All-Star (1999, 2003); Central League Middle Reliever of the Year (1998)
Medals
Men's baseball
Representing Japan
Goodwill Games
Silver medal – second place	1990 Seattle	Team
- Last updated on: 17 January 2018

Eiji Ochiai (落合 英二, born July 25, 1969) is a former Nippon Professional Baseball pitcher. Before his professional career with the Chunichi Dragons, he pitched for Japan's team in 1990, in a best-of-five college competition with the United States team.
