= Hirotoshi Kitagawa =

Japanese baseball player and coach (born 1972)

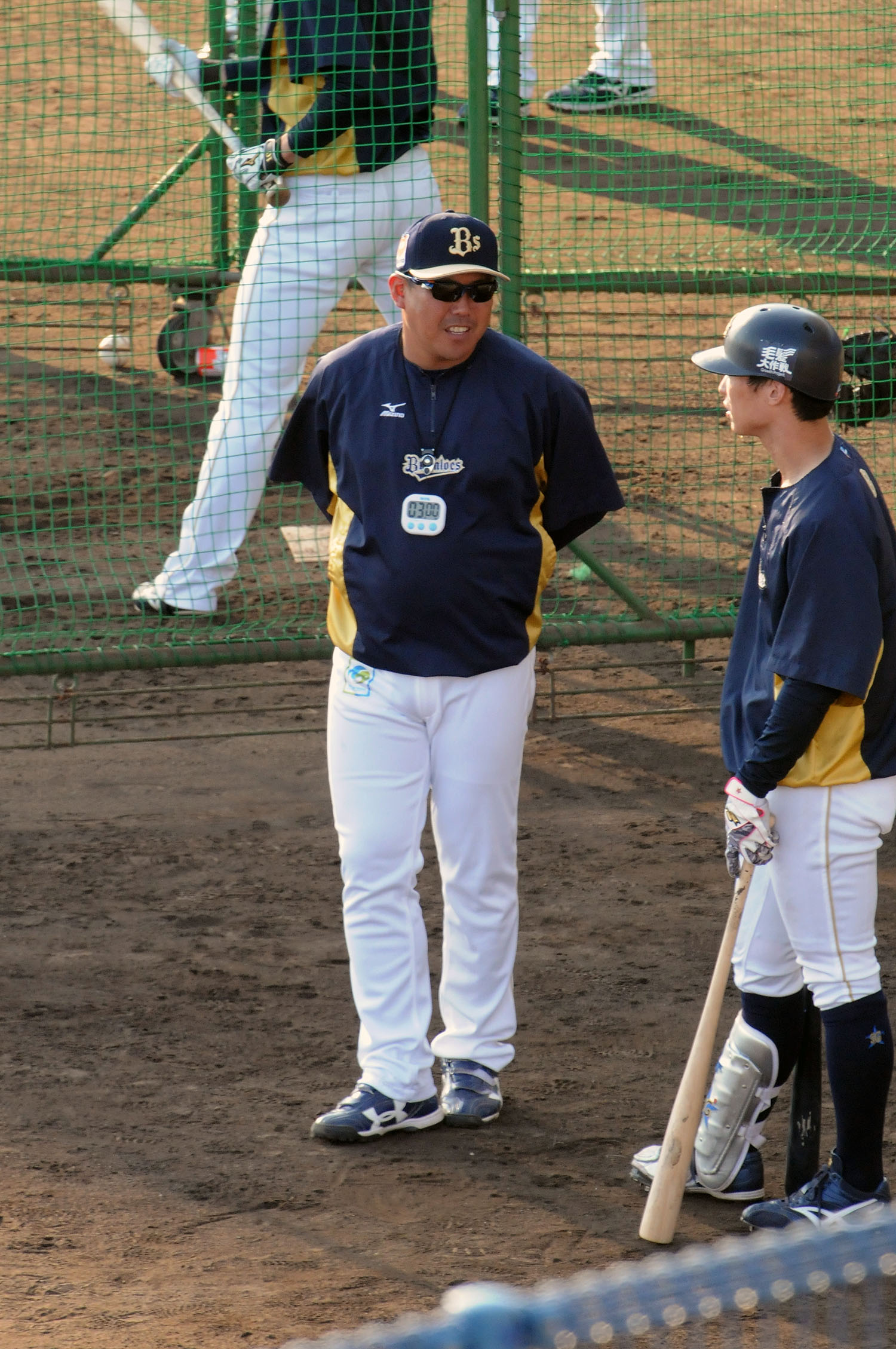

Hanshin Tigers – No. 80
- Infielder / Catcher / Coach
- Born: May 27, 1972 (age 54); Itami, Hyōgo, Japan
- Batted: Right Threw: Right

NPB debut
- August 16, 1995, for the Hanshin Tigers

Last NPB appearance
- October 7, 2012, for the Orix Buffaloes

NPB statistics (through 2012)
- Batting average: .276
- Home runs: 102
- Hits: 1076
- Stats at Baseball Reference

Teams
- As player: Hanshin Tigers (1995–2000); Osaka Kintetsu Buffaloes (2001–2004); Orix Buffaloes (2005–2012); As coach: Orix Buffaloes (2013–2014, 2016); Tokyo Yakult Swallows (2017–2019); Hanshin Tigers (2020–Present)
- Last updated on: 11 February 2020

Hirotoshi Kitagawa (北川 博敏, Kitagawa Hirotoshi; born May 27, 1972) is a former Nippon Professional Baseball infielder.

In 2001, his pinch hit walk-off grand slam erased a 3-run deficit in the bottom of the ninth inning and secured the pennant for the Osaka Kintetsu Buffaloes.
