= Italy national football team results (unofficial matches) =

- Win Draw Loss

This is a list of the Italy national football team's unofficial results from their inception to the present day that are not accorded the status of official internationals, not being recognized by FIFA. Player appearances and goals in these matches are also not counted in their totals.

== 1890s ==
An early attempt to create an Italy national team occurred on 30 April 1899, when an Italian selection played a Swiss eleven, losing 0–2 in Turin.

30 April 1899 International friendly	Italy XI	0–2	Switzerland XI	Turin, Italy
		Report		Stadium: Velodrome Humbert I Referee: Henry Goodley (England)

== 1910s ==
=== 1912 ===
3 March 1912 International friendly	Italy	1–2	Foreign Players	Genoa, Italy
	De Vecchi 90' (pen.)	Report		Stadium: Stadio Luigi Ferraris
Note: Italy faced a selection of Foreign players in the Italian Championship, which included 2 Italian players.

14 April 1912 International friendly	Italy	1–1	English Wanderers	Genoa, Italy
	De Vecchi 90' (pen.)	Report1; Report2		Stadium: Stadio Luigi Ferraris; Referee: Henry Goodley (England)

=== 1913 ===
18 May 1913 International friendly	Italy	0–2	Reading F.C.	Turin, Italy
16:00 CET (UTC+01:00)		Report1; Report2; Report3	Joe Bailey 4'; Hanney	Stadium: Piazza d'armi Referee: Bollinger (Switzerland)
Note: During Reading's first goal, the Italian goalkeeper Giovanni Innocenti was injured and had to leave the pitch, being replaced in goal by the full-back Attilio Trerè.

=== 1915 ===
1 January 1915 International friendly	Italy	6–2	France-Belgium representative team	Milan, Italy
	A. Fresia 9', 13', 50'; Cevenini I 25'; Cevenini III 84', 87'	Report1; Report2	Vialmonteil 36'; Van Hege 76'	Stadium: San Siro; Referee: Umberto Meazza (Italy)
Note: In the 88th minute Hause voluntarily kicks a penalty into Giuseppe Trivellini's arms.

3 January 1915 International friendly	Italy	2–3	France-Belgium representative team	Turin, Italy
	De Vecchi 10'; Santamaria 46'	Report1; Report2	Vialmonteli 19' van Hege 53', 80'	Stadium: Piazza d'armi Referee: Edoardo Pasteur (Italy)

=== 1917 ===
In June 1917, Italy faced the Belgian Front Wanderers.

3 June 1917 International friendly	Italy	3–4	(Belgium) Belgian Front Wanderers	Milan, Italy
	Cevenini I 9', ?'; Santamaria 78'	Report1; Report2	? 32' ? 38'; Van Cant 51'; Ballyn 58'	Stadium: San Siro; Referee: Mauro (Italy)

=== 1918 ===
20 September 1918 International friendly	Italy	1–1	Belgium	Rome, Italy
	Santamaria 78'	Report	? 32'	Stadium: Stadio Nazionale PNF

22 September 1918 International friendly	Italy	1–1	Belgium	Rome, Italy
	Santamaria 78'	Report	? 32'	Stadium: Stadio Nazionale PNF

=== 1919 British Inter-Theatre of War Championship ===
22 April 1919 British Inter-Theatre of War Championship group stage	British Expeditionary Force (France)	3–1	Italy	Aldershot, England
		Report

24 April 1919 British Inter-Theatre of War Championship group stage	Salonika (Greece)	5–1	Italy	Aldershot, England
		Report

=== 1919 Inter-Allied Games ===
In the summer of 1919, Italy participated in the Inter-Allied Games in Paris, on the occasion of the celebration of the Allied victory in World War I. This Italian team included five participants of the 1920 Summer Games in the following year and the rest played for the main team at one point. They comfortably beat Canada and the United States, which was the first time, official or otherwise, that Belgium faced a non-European team. However, a 1–4 loss to eventual champions Czechoslovakia on the opening day cost them a place in the final, although Belgium got their revenge by beating them in the final of the 1920 Olympics.

25 June 1919 Inter-Allied Games group stage	Italy	9–0	Greece	Paris, France
	Sardi; Cevenini; Santamaria; Asti	Report		Stadium: Stade Pershing

26 June 1919 Inter-Allied Games group stage	Italy	7–1	Romania	Paris, France
	? ?'	Report	? ?'	Stadium: Stade Pershing

28 June 1919 Inter-Allied Games group stage	France	2–0	Italy	Paris, France
	Gamblin ?' (pen.); Nicolas ?'	Report		Stadium: Stade Pershing

== 1920s ==
=== 1922 ===
4 June 1922 International friendly	Italy	1–3	Burnley F.C.	Milan, Italy
17:00 CET (UTC+01:00)	Papa III 36'	Report1; Report2; Report3	Anderson 28'; Kelly 42'; Mosscrop 87'	Stadium: San Siro; Referee: Crivelli (Italy)

=== 1923 ===
4 February 1923 International friendly	Italy Lega Sul	5–0	(Hungary) Szegedi AK	Rome, Italy
	Santamaria 78'	Report		Stadium: Stadio Nazionale PNF

21 May 1923 International friendly	FC Pastore (Italy)	2–5	Italy	Corso Marsiglia, Italy
	?	Report	Migliavacca; Tornabuoni; Baloncieri	Stadium: Stadio di Corso Marsiglia
Note: Three halves were played.

30 December 1923 International friendly	Italy Lega Sul	2–1	France Ligue South-Eastern	Rome, Italy
	Santamaria 78'	Report	? 32'	Stadium: Stadio Nazionale PNF

=== 1924 ===
30 March 1924 International friendly	France Ligue South-Eastern	2–1	Italy Lega Sul	Marseille, France
	Santamaria 78'	Report	? 32'

4 May 1924 International friendly	Italy	1–1	(Italy) Maccabi Brno	Bologna, Italy
	Santamaria 78'	Report	? 32'	Stadium: Stadio Sterlino

11 May 1924 International friendly	Italy	1–1	(Austria) Wiener Amateur FK	Turin, Italy
	Santamaria 78'	Report	? 32'	Stadium: Stadio di Corso Marsiglia

=== 1925 ===
31 May 1925 International friendly	Italy Lega Sul	1–3	Italy Lega Norte	Rome, Italy
	Santamaria 78'	Report	? 32'	Stadium: Stadio Nazionale PNF

1 November 1925 International friendly	Italy	3–0	(Hungary) Hungarian Republic	Genoa, Italy
	Magnozzi 5'; Cevenini 10', 60'	Report1; Report2		Stadium: Via del Piano

8 November 1925 International friendly	Italy Lega Sul	1–3	Yugoslavia	Naples, Italy
	Santamaria 78'	Report	? 32'	Stadium: Stadio Arenaccia

=== 1926 ===
11 June 1926 International friendly	Italy	3–1	(Hungary) Nemzeti SC	Turin, Italy
		Report	Magnozzi; Cevenini III	Stadium: Motovelodromo

20 July 1926 International friendly	Sweden representative team	0–3	Italy	Stockholm, Sweden
19:00 CET (UTC+01:00)		Report1; Report2	Magnozzi; Cevenini III	Stadium: Stockholm Olympic Stadium; Referee: Axel Bergqvist (Sweden)

=== 1928 ===
5 August 1928 International friendly	New York Stars	2–1	Italy XI	New York, United States
	Meazza 14'; Janni 40'; Blasevich 49'	Report	Rossetti 6', 9'; Baloncieri 34'

11 August 1928 International friendly	Philadelphia Stars	3–8	Italy XI	Philadelphia, United States
	Meazza 14'; Janni 40'; Blasevich 49'	Report	Rossetti 6', 9'; Baloncieri 34'

12 August 1928 International friendly	New York Nationals	1–3	Italy XI	New York, United States
	Meazza 14'; Janni 40'; Blasevich 49'	Report	Rossetti 6', 9'; Baloncieri 34'

19 August 1928 International friendly	Brooklyn Wanderers	3–2	Italy XI	New York, United States
	Meazza 14'; Janni 40'; Blasevich 49'	Report	Rossetti 6', 9'; Baloncieri 34'

25 August 1928 International friendly	New York Giants	0–1	Italy XI	New York, United States
		Report	Rossetti 6', 9'; Baloncieri 34'

26 August 1928 International friendly	Fall River FC	4–2	Italy XI	Tiverton, United States
		Report	Rossetti 6', 9'; Baloncieri 34'

29 August 1928 International friendly	New York Giants	3–5	Italy XI	New York, United States
		Report	Rossetti 6', 9'; Baloncieri 34'

2 September 1928 International friendly	Sparta Athletic FC	5–1	Italy XI	Chicago, United States
	Rossetti 6', 9'; Baloncieri 34'	Report	Rossetti 6', 9'; Baloncieri 34'

3 September 1928 International friendly	Detroit Stars	2–4	Italy XI	Detroit, United States
	Rossetti 6', 9'; Baloncieri 34'	Report	Rossetti 6', 9'; Baloncieri 34'

5 September 1928 International friendly	Galicia F.C.	0–1	Italy XI	New York, United States
	Rossetti 6', 9'; Baloncieri 34'	Report	Rossetti 6', 9'; Baloncieri 34'

10 October 1928 International friendly	Inter Milan	3–6	Italy	Milan, Italy
15:20 CET	Meazza 14'; Janni 40'; Blasevich 49'; Levratto 56'; Libonatti 58'; Rivolta 60'	Report	Rossetti 6', 9'; Baloncieri 34'	Referee: Barlassina
Note: Both halves lasted 30 minutes, and Italy played in a garnet jersey.

== 1930s ==
14 June 1934 International friendly	Italy XI	0–2	Argentina	Milan, Italy
		Report	Jerusalem 40'; Stroh 63', pen.'	Stadium: Arena Civica

21 March 1937 International Cup Tournament	Austria	2–0	Italy	Vienna, Austria
15:00 CET	Jerusalem 40'; Stroh 63', pen.' Jerusalem (red card)	Report1; Report2		Stadium: Prater Stadium; Referee: Olsson (Sweden)
Note: Austria considers the match as official.

On the occasion of the Swiss National Exhibition of 1939, a North Italy selection played against a Switzerland XI.

11 June 1939 International friendly	Switzerland	1–7	(Italy) North Italy	Zurich, Switzerland
	Amadò 26', pen.'	Report	?	Attendance: 12,000; Referee: Charles E. Argent (England)

== 1940s ==
26 May 1949 International friendly	Italy XI	2–2	(Argentina) CA River Plate	Turin, Italy
	Jerusalem 40'; Stroh 63', pen.'	Report		Stadium: Stadio Comunale

== 1950s ==
=== 1950 ===
19 April 1950 International friendly	Italy	5–1	Switzerland	Como, Italy
	Fatton 31'; Hügi 70'	Report	?	Stadium: Stadio Giuseppe Sinigaglia
Note: Three halves of 30 minutes.

=== 1951 ===
29 June 1951 International friendly	CA River Plate (Argentina)	3–1	Italy XI	Buenos Aires, Argentina
		Report		Stadium: Estadio Monumental

=== 1952 ===
22 October 1952 International friendly	Switzerland XI	2–2	(Italy) North Italy	Bern, Switzerland
	Fatton 31'; Hügi 70'	Report	?	Stadium: Wankdorf Stadium; Referee: René Baumberger (Switzerland)

=== 1953 ===
15 April 1953 International friendly	Italy	8–1	(Italy) Alessandria	Bologna, Italy
16:00 CET	Pandolfini 8', pen.' Boniperti 13', 26', 47'; Cervellati 21', 33', 48'; Frignani 53'	Report	Testa 51'	Stadium: Stadio Comunale; Referee: Meazza (Italy)

10 December 1953 International friendly	Italy	9–0	(Italy) Polisportiva Rapallo	Genoa, Italy
14:50 CET	Ricagni 4', 70'; Boniperti 10', 42', 62'; Martegani 14', 65'; Muccinelli 28'; Frignani 39'	Report		Stadium: Stadio Luigi Ferraris; Referee: Czeizler

=== 1957 ===
13 November 1957 International friendly	Italy	4–1	(England) Luton Town F.C.	Milan, Italy
	Jerusalem 40'; Stroh 63', pen.'	Report	?	Stadium: San Siro

20 November 1957 International friendly	Italy	1–1	(England) Charlton Athletic F.C.	Milan, Italy
	Jerusalem 40'	Report	?	Stadium: San Siro

=== 1959 ===
22 April 1959 International friendly	Italy	4–1	(Italy) Empoli F.C.	Coverciano, Italy
14:30 CET (UTC+01:00)	Galli 5'; Brighenti 12', 34', 63'	Report	Innocenti 57'	Referee: Giuseppe Galluzzi (Italy)

=== 1962 ===
4 April 1962 International friendly	Italy	3–1	Clube de Regatas do Flamengo	Rome, Italy
15:30 CET (UTC+01:00)	Maschio 38'; Marchesi 56' (pen.); Bean 89'	Report	Henrique 36' (pen.)	Stadium: Stadio Olimpico; Referee: Giuseppe Adami (Italy)

=== 1966 ===
6 July 1966 International friendly	DBU Copenhagen	0–4	Italy	Copenhagen, Denmark
19:00 CET (UTC+01:00)		Report	Mazzola 6', 8', 73'; Rivera 35'	Stadium: Idrætsparken; Referee: Erik Johansson (Sweden)

=== 1970 ===
24 May 1970 International friendly	Deportivo Toluca F.C.	3–5	Italy	Toluca, Mexico
	Pereda 26', 86' (pen.); Romero Reyes 58'	Report	Riva 38', 55'; Gori 53'; Boninsegna 77', 84'	Stadium: Estadio Nemesio Díez; Referee: Juan Jose De La Mora (Mexico)

=== 1974 ===
13 November 1974 International friendly	Italy	1–0	FC Bayern Munich	Rome, Italy
19:30 CET (UTC+01:00)	Boninsegna 47'	Report		Stadium: Stadio Olimpico; Referee: Domenico Serafino (Italy)

=== 1975 ===
19 February 1975 International friendly	Italy	4–1	Norway	Florence, Italy
15:00 CET (UTC+01:00)	Graziani 16'; Chinaglia 36'; Savoldi 60'; Cordova 81'	Report	Fuglset 82' (pen.)	Stadium: Stadio Comunale; Attendance: 35,000; Referee: Giulio Ciacci (Italy)

4 April 1975 International friendly	Italy	10–0	United States	Rome, Italy
15:30 CET (UTC+01:00)	Rocca 7', 18'; Cordova 16'; Chinaglia 25', 58'; Graziani 27', 77', 82'; Savoldi 51', 70'	Report		Stadium: Stadio Olimpico; Attendance: 15,000; Referee: Gianfranco Menegali (Italy)

=== 1978 ===
27 May 1978 International friendly	Sportivo Italiano	0–1	Italy	Buenos Aires, Argentina
15:30 ART (UTC−03:00)		Report	Bettega 63'	Stadium: Estadio República de Italia; Referee: Alberto Jose Ducatelli (Argentina)

=== 1980 ===
16 March 1980 International friendly	Biellese (Italy)	0–13	Italy	Biella, Italy
16:30 CET (UTC+01:00)		Report	Cabrini 7'; Causio 10'; Rossi 15', 19', 35'; Bettega 27', 29', 43'; Altobelli 49', 80'; Graziani 57', 62', 85'	Stadium: Stadio Lamarmora; Referee: Trevisan (Italy)

1 June 1980 International friendly	Italy	4–1	Hungary B	Como, Italy
20:30 CEST (UTC+02:00)	Graziani 13', 83'; Antognoni 77'; Bettega 81'	Report	Varga 66' (pen.)	Stadium: Stadio Giuseppe Sinigaglia; Attendance: 12,000; Referee: Alberto Michelotti (Italy)

=== 1982 ===
8 June 1982 International friendly	Italy	1–0	S.C. Braga	Vigo, Spain
18:15 CEST (UTC+02:00)	Graziani 38'	Report		Stadium: Balaídos; Referee: António Garrido (Portugal)

=== 1985 ===
29 May 1985 International friendly	Puebla F.C.	1–1	Italy	Puebla City, Mexico
14:00 CST (UTC−06:00)	Romano 16'	Report	Galderisi 75' (pen.)	Stadium: Estadio Cuauhtémoc; Attendance: 22,000; Referee: Jorge Alberto Leanza (Mexico)

=== 1986 ===
24 May 1986 International friendly	Italy	4–0	Guatemala	Cancún, Mexico
12:00 CST (UTC−06:00)	Altobelli 22', 65', 85'; Galderisi 71'	Report		Stadium: Estadio Atlante; Attendance: 5,000; Referee: Fregoso Fregoso (Mexico)

=== 1988 ===
1 June 1988 International friendly	Italy	4–0	FC Lugano	Varese, Italy
20:15 CEST (UTC+02:00)	Vialli 6'; Altobelli 65'; Maldini 72', 88'	Report		Stadium: Stadio Franco Ossola; Referee: Pierluigi Magni (Italy)

=== 1990 ===
30 May 1990 International friendly	Italy	0–0	Greece	Perugia, Italy
20:30 CEST (UTC+02:00)		Report		Stadium: Stadio Renato Curi; Attendance: 35,000; Referee: José Rosa dos Santos (Portugal)

2 June 1990 International friendly	Italy	3–0	AS Cannes	Arezzo, Italy
20:30 CEST (UTC+02:00)	Vialli 38' (pen.), 72'; De Napoli 40'	Report		Stadium: Stadio Comunale; Attendance: 16,000; Referee: Marcello Nicchi (Italy)

=== 1992 ===
23 September 1992 International friendly	FC Zürich	0–2	Italy	Zurich, Switzerland
14:30 CEST (UTC+02:00)		Report	Bianchi 39'; Vialli 45'	Stadium: Letzigrund; Attendance: 14,300; Referee: Arturo Martino (Switzerland)

=== 1998 ===
16 December 1998 International friendly	Italy	6–2	FIFA All-stars	Rome, Italy
2:00 CET (UTC+01:00)	Inzaghi 10'; Di Francesco 37'; Fuser 44'; Chiesa 50', 80', 87'	Report	Batistuta 21'; Weah 23'	Stadium: Stadio Olimpico; Attendance: 21.352; Referee: Remi Arrel (France)

=== 2000 ===
29 October 2000 International friendly	Italy	0–0	FIFA All-stars	Rome, Italy
12:00 CET (UTC+01:00)		Report		Stadium: Stadio Olimpico; Attendance: 30,000; Referee: Alfredo Trentalange (first half) (Italy); Salvatore Racalbuto (second half) (Italy)

=== 2014 ===
8 June 2014 International friendly	Fluminense FC	3–5	Italy	Volta Redonda, Brazil
16:00 BRT (UTC−03:00)	Chiquinho 25'; Carlinhos 37'; Carvalho 64'	Report	Insigne 23', 55'; Immobile 31', 53', 54'	Stadium: Estádio Raulino de Oliveira; Attendance: 15,780; Referee: Marcelo de Lima Henrique (Brazil)

=== 2017 ===
31 May 2017 Friendly	Italy	8–0	San Marino	Empoli, Italy
21:30 CEST (UTC+02:00)	Lapadula 10', 19', 49'; Ferrari 13'; Petagna 16'; Caldara 48'; Politano 58'; Bonini 65' (o.g.)	Report		Stadium: Stadio Carlo Castellani; Attendance: 6,000; Referee: Sandro Schärer (Switzerland)

=== 2023 ===
9 June 2023 60-minute Training game	Italy	12–0	Cagliari XI	Sardinia, Italy
	Retegui; Raspadori; Chiesa; Pellegrini (pen.); Immobile; Zaniolo; Locatelli; Raspadori	Report		Stadium: Forte Village Resort; Attendance: 0 Referee: Unknown
