= Football at the Inter-Allied Games =

1919 Football at the Inter-Allied Games
Tournament details
- Host country: France
- City: Paris
- Dates: 24–29 June 1919
- Teams: 8
- Venue: 1 (in 1 host city)

Final positions
- Champions: Czechoslovakia (1st title)
- Runners-up: France

Tournament statistics
- Matches played: 13
- Goals scored: 87 (6.69 per match)
- Top scorers: Antonín Janda; Paul Nicolas; (7 goals)

Football at the Inter-Allied Games was an unofficial football event organized by the United States military and the YMCA. It took place in June 1919, a year after the cessation of hostilities on the western front, and all the matches were played at the newly constructed Stade Pershing in Paris. The tournament featured some of Europe's top players. The Inter-Allied Games is the first football tournament, official or otherwise, with national teams from two different continents.

For this tournament, were invited teams from all the countries who had been on the winning side in the war as to celebrate their victory. Eight national teams participated in the competition: Belgium, Canada, Czechoslovakia, hosts France, Greece, Italy, Romania and the United States.

Czechoslovakia, whose participation in the Allied-Games represented the first major international sporting appearance for the newly created nation, made a memorable campaign, winning the tournament without losing a single match. Along with Czechoslovakia, the Allied-Games was also the first taste of international football for Romania and Greece, but because the matches played in Paris are not recognized by FIFA or the International Olympic Committee, and therefore, they are not considered official international matches, the Czech's official debut only came at the 1920 Olympics, while Romania's came in 1922 and Greece's only came 10 years later, in 1929.

== Venues ==
The venue was the newly constructed Stade Pershing in Paris, a gift to France from the American people.

== Squads ==
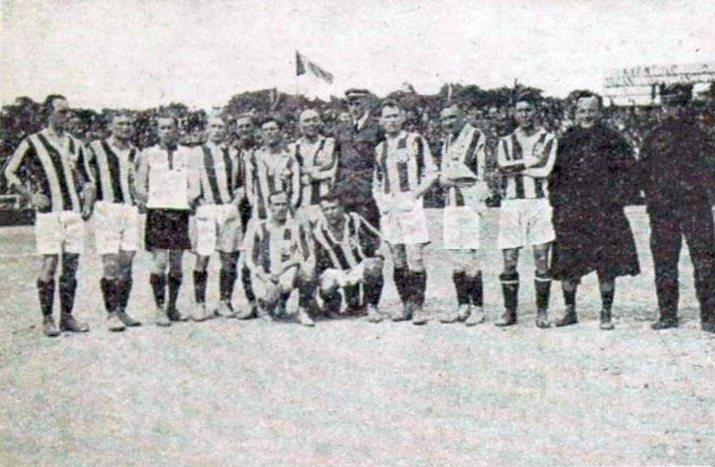
The Czechoslovakia national team, the champion of the games.

According to the regulations, the athletes who could take part in the competitions were those in active military service in the armies of the Allied countries or who had been in military service in the armies of the Allied countries during the War, and a significant number of players of the highest level met these criteria, many of whom being players of the national teams, which means that this tournament featured some of Europe's top players. The Winning Forces of the First World War assembled football teams for this tournament, resulting in 8 participants:

- United States: The American team was selected from among the participants in the American Expeditionary Forces Championship held the month before, which was contested by sections of the American Expeditionary Forces and won by the Le Mans by 80th Division. The U.S. army was willing to return soldiers who had already been demobilized back to the U.S. when they thought it gave them the best chance to win an event, but such a policy did not seem to apply to soccer and instead most of the returned athletes competed in track and field events. In contrast to this approach other nations turned out strong teams featuring some of the continent's top players.
- Canada: Team Canada was also formed by members of their own Expeditionary Force. In addition to a number of leading Canadian football players, it also included several former British players who emigrated to Canada, such as Samuel Gough and Douglas Thomson, who were both twice wounded during the war, Charles Hutchinson was shot in the left arm during the Second Battle of Ypres in 1915, which resulted in a fracture of the humerus, but their most well-known player was Alf Spouncer, who had won the FA Cup once in 1898 with Nottingham Forest.
- Czechoslovakia: The Czechoslovak team was made up largely of players taken from the club Slavia Prague, the traditional champions of Czechoslovakia, and the Czech team that reached the gold medal match of the 1920 Olympics (which they lost 2–0 to hosts, Belgium) included thirteen players from the Inter-Allied roster, the most of any nation that competed in both tournaments. The top star of the side being forward Antonín Janda, who was the tournament's shared top goal scorer with 7 goals. Others top Czech players who appeared in both the Inter-Allied games and the Olympics were Defender Antonín Hojer and midfielder Václav Pilát.
- Belgium: Belgium also had a very good team, with at least six players from the 1919 side going on to help the country win gold at the 1920 Olympics. Among the leading figures on both teams was Armand Swartenbroeks.
- France: Nine players from this team played for the national team, and five at the 1920 Olympics. The top stars of their side were forward Paul Nicolas, who was the tournament's shared top goal scorer with 7 goals, and goalkeeper Pierre Chayriguès, who managed to not concede a single goal in the group stage, including a clean-sheet against Italy. Former Real Madrid player René Petit was also part of this team.
- Italy: Five players from this team played in the 1920 Olympics, and almost all the other players played in the national team at some point. The players who led the line for the Italians were Enrico Sardi, Luigi Cevenini, and Swiss-born forward Ermanno Aebi, who despite having Swiss citizenship he volunteered for military service in Italy which explains his appearance at the Inter-Allied games. The Italian team also included the likes of Aristodemo Santamaria and Giuseppe Asti.

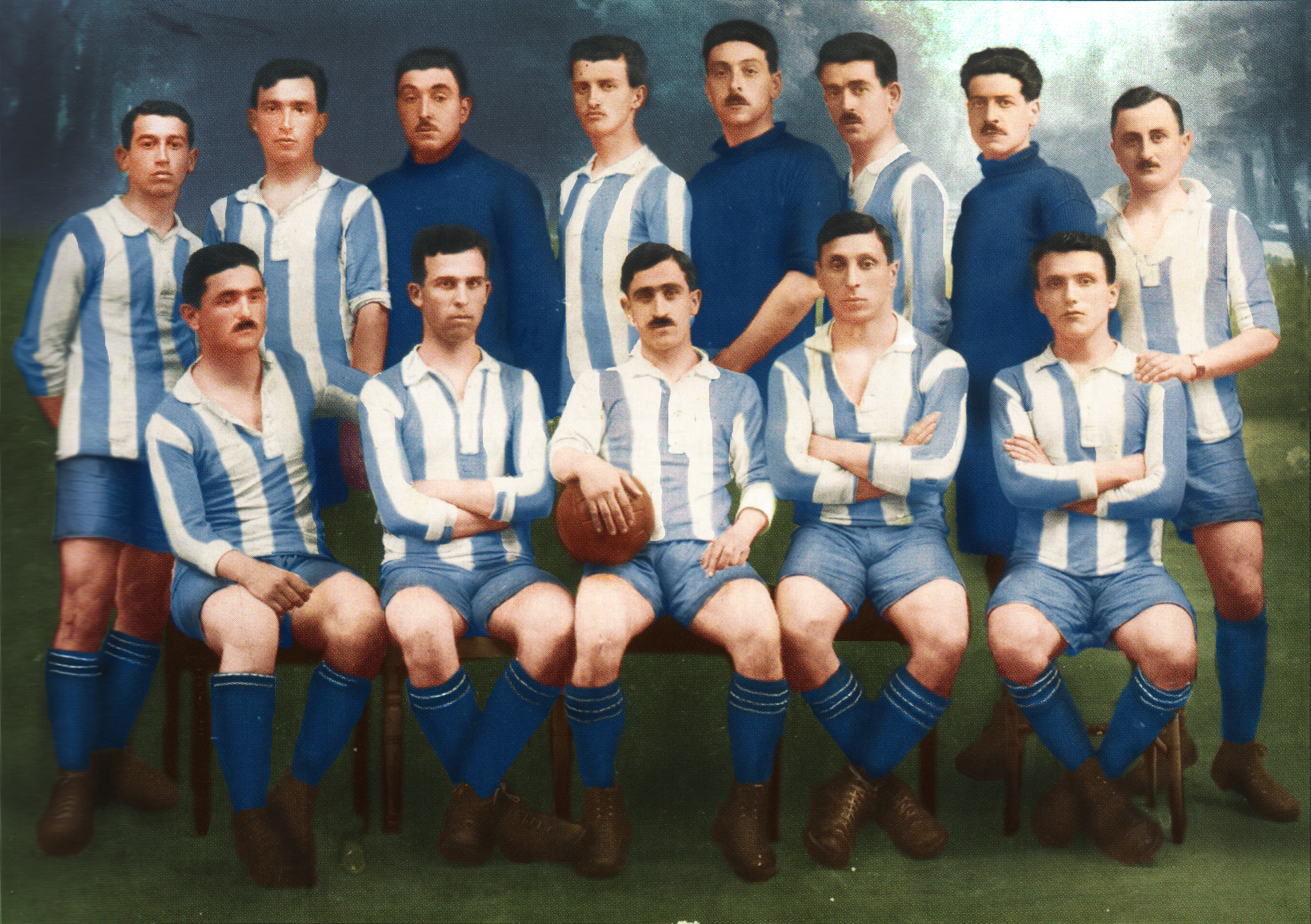
The Greek national team for the Inter-Allied Games in Paris, 1919

.

- Greece: The star of the Greek national team that participated in the Inter-Allied Games was Giorgos Kalafatis, in fact, Greece's team having the leading conscripted Greek footballers at the tournament was based on the initiative from Kalafatis. In Paris, Kalafatis collected information about basketball and volleyball (sports unknown then in Greece), and after his return to Athens, he started his efforts on creating basketball and volleyball teams with Panathinaikos. He was also a player/manager for Greece in the 1920 Olympic Games in Antwerp.
- Romania: The Romania football team at the Games was drawn almost exclusively from Bucharest clubs, such as Tricolor, Venus, and Coltea, and no ethnic Hungarians were involved; it did, however, include two foreigners, the German Rudolf Schmetau and the Englishman Ernest Hillard. In goal for Romania was the 22-year-old Constantin Rădulescu, who would later select and/or coach the Romanian national team at the first three World Cups, and would be a prime mover in the establishment of the Romanian Football Federation (FRF) in 1923 and the divisional league system (Alexandru Săvulescu, who would later be on the staff with Rădulescu at two World Cups, was also a member of this team).

== Format ==
The 8 teams were organized into two groups of four. Each team played each other once and each team was awarded 2 points for a win, 1 for a draw, and 0 for a loss, and the winners of the groups would meet in the final, where the winner of the tournament would be determined.

== Summary ==
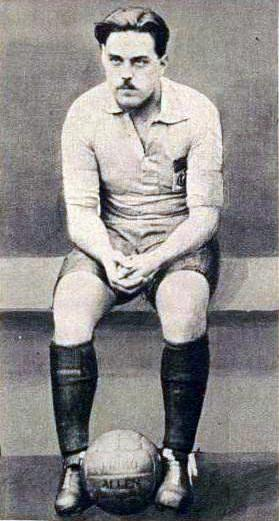
Paul Nicolas was the top scorer of the tournament.

Group A contained France, Italy, Greece, and Romania while the other consisted of the United States, Canada, Czechoslovakia, and Belgium. In Group A, both France and Italy defeated Greece and Romania comfortably, meaning that the ticket to the final would be decided between them in the last match of the group. The Italian team, which had recently performed brilliantly against the Czechs and the Belgian military teams in Rome, had to bow to France 2–0, which thus finished the group without conceding a single goal, in part thanks to the good performances of their goalkeeper Pierre Chayriguès. Greece was trashed 0–9 and 0–11 by Italy and France respectively, conceding a poker in both games to Luigi Cevenini and Paul Nicolas. The latter also netted twice against Romania and his side's second against Italy to bring his goal tally up to seven.

In group B, the fate of the first place was decided in the very first match between Czechoslovakia and Belgium, a kind of "rehearsal" of the 1920 Olympic final, which ended in a 4–1 win to the Czechs. (Note: Many French newspapers reported the score as 5–1, but according to Czech sources and the official bulletin of the games committee, the score of the match was 4–1.) Czech forwards Antonin Janda and Jan Vaník also found the back of the net in all three matches of the group stage, with Janda netting once in a 4–1 win over Belgium, and twice against both Canada (3–2) and the USA (8–2), thus helping his side top the group and reach the final at the expense of Belgium. They would both score in the final against France as well.

The most dramatic games of the whole tournament were the ones that decided the third spot of each group, a Balkanize derby between Greece and Romania in group A and an American derby between the USA and Canada in group B, and while the former finished with a 3–2 victory to a Greece team that had conceded twenty goals without reply in their two previous games, the later saw Canada lead 4–1, but, as the newspaper Le Liberte pointed out: "...from that moment it began to rain from free kicks and penalties fixed by the American referee of the match in favor of their compatriots". As a result, the US team celebrated a 5–4 victory. The performance of the United States team at the games was not the best as they won only a single game while finishing with a minus-12 goal difference, however, the U.S. team acquitted itself pretty well considering that the American Expeditionary Forces Championship seemed to give little attention to building the strongest possible squad.

Ultimately, Czechoslovakia and France met in the final and after a close match, the Czechs took home the silverware with a 3–2 win. Janda, by his aggressiveness and good sportsmanship, became one of the most popular players of the tournament, but besides the wonderful work of Janda, the shifty playing of Václav Pilát at the center was also a big factor in the eventual 3–2 victory. Of all the team competitions organized in the Inter-Allied Games, football was the most successful.

== Results ==
=== Group 1 ===
Pos	Team	Pld	W	D	L	P.C.	Qualification
1	France	3	3	0	0	1.000	Advance to Final
2	Italy	3	2	0	1	0.667	
3	Greece	3	1	0	2	0.333	
4	Romania	3	0	0	3	0.000	

Updated to match(es) played on unknown. Source:
24 June 1919

France	4–0	Romania
Nicolas; Gastiger; Rénier	Report

Stade Pershing, Paris
Attendance: 10,000

25 June 1919

Italy	9–0 (Note: Some sources report the match as 5–2, but the official report reports 9–0.)	Greece
Sardi; Cevenini; Santamaria; Asti	Report

Stade Pershing, Paris

26 June 1919

Italy	7–1	Romania
Ermanno Aebi ?'; Cevenini	Report	Mares ?'

Stade Pershing, Paris

26 June 1919

France	11–0	Greece
Nicolas; Rénier; Dubly; Darjeu; Petit	Report

Stade Pershing, Paris

28 June 1919

Greece	3–2	Romania
?'	Report	?'

Stade Pershing, Paris

28 June 1919

France	2–0	Italy
Gamblin ?' (pen.); Nicolas ?'	Report1; Report2

Stade Pershing, Paris

=== Group 2 ===
Pos	Team	Pld	W	D	L	P.C.	Qualification
1	Czechoslovakia	3	3	0	0	1.000	Advance to Final
2	Belgium	3	2	0	1	0.667	
3	United States	3	1	0	2	0.333	
4	Canada	3	0	0	3	0.000	

Updated to match(es) played on unknown. Source:
24 June 1919

Czechoslovakia	4–1	Belgium
Sedláček 24', 77'; Vaník 31'; Janda 46'	Report	Vlamynck 41'

Stade Pershing, Paris
Attendance: 20,000

25 June 1919

United States	5–4	Canada
?'	Report	?'

Stade Pershing, Paris

26 June 1919

Czechoslovakia	8–2	United States
Janda ?', ?'; Pilát ?', ?'; Vaník ?', ?'; Sedláček ?'; Prošek ?'	Report	?'

Stade Pershing, Paris

26 June 1919

Belgium	5–2	Canada
?'	Report	?'

Stade Pershing, Paris

28 June 1919

Czechoslovakia	3–2	Canada
Janda ?', ?'; Vaník ?'	Report	?'

Stade Pershing, Paris

28 June 1919

Belgium	7–0	United States
?'	Report

Stade Pershing, Paris

== Final ==
1919 Inter-Allied Games final
29 June 1919
16:30

France	2–3	Czechoslovakia
Deydier 12'; Rénier 28'	Report	Vanik 31'; Janda 84', 90'

Stade Pershing, Paris
Attendance: 25,000

== Winners ==
Football at the Inter-Allied Games

Czechoslovakia
First title

== Statistics ==
=== Goalscorers ===
There were 87 goals scored in 13 matches, for an average of 6.69 goals per match.

7 goals

- Antonín Janda
- Paul Nicolas

6 goals

- Luigi Cevenini

5 goals

- Albert Rénier
- Jan Vaník

3 goals

- Josef Sedláček

2 goals

- Raymond Dubly
- Aristodemo Santamaria
- Enrico Sardi
- Václav Pilát

1 goal

- Honoré Vlamynck
- Darjeu
- Lucien Gamblin
- Maurice Gastiger
- René Petit
- Paul Deydier
- Giuseppe Asti
- Ermanno Aebi
- Mares
- Václav Prošek

== Hat-tricks ==
Inter-Allied Games hat-tricks
#	Player	G	For	Result	Against	Phase	Date	Report
1.	Luigi Cevenini	4	Italy	9–0	Greece	Group stage	25 June 1919	Report
2.	Paul Nicolas	5	France	11–0	Greece	Group stage	26 June 1919	Report
3.	Albert Rénier	3	France	11–0	Greece	Group stage	26 June 1919	Report

== See also ==
- 1976 U.S.A. Bicentennial Cup Tournament
- Football at the 1906 Intercalated Games
- Belgium national football team results (unofficial matches)
- Italy national football team results (unofficial matches)
- France national football team results (unofficial matches)
- Romania national football team results (unofficial matches)
