= France national football team results (unofficial matches) =

- Win Draw Loss

This is a list of the France national football team's unofficial results from their inception to the present day that are not accorded the status of official internationals, not being recognized by FIFA. Player appearances and goals in these matches are also not counted to their totals.

== 1900s ==
20 September 1900 Summer Olympics	USFSA XI (France)	0 – 4	(United Kingdom) Upton Park FC	Vincennes, France
		Report (1); Report (2)	Nicholas; Turner; Zealley	Stadium: Vélodrome de Vincennes

23 September 1900 Summer Olympics	USFSA XI (France)	6 – 2	(Belgium) Université de Bruxelles	Vincennes, France
	Peltier 1' ?	Report	Spanoghe van Heuckelum	Stadium: Vélodrome de Vincennes; Attendance: 1,500; Referee: Jack Wood (Great Britain)

13 March 1904 Friendly	France (USFSA)	1 – 6	(England) Southampton FC	Paris, France
				Stadium: Parc des Princes

14 March 1904 Friendly	France (FSAPF)	0 – 11	(England) Southampton FC	Paris, France
				Stadium: Parc des Princes

16 April 1904 Friendly	France	4 – 11	(England) Corinthian FC	Paris, France
				Stadium: Parc des Princes

24 April 1904 Friendly	France	6 – 3	Foreigners from France	Joinville-le-Pont, France

5 March 1905 Friendly	France XI	1 – 3	(England) London League XI	Paris, France
		Report

25 May 1905 Friendly	France	1 – 3	(Belgium) Union Saint-Gilloise	Paris, France

27 December 1908 Friendly	Select Nord France	4 – 3	(England) Townley Park FC	Lille, France
		Report

== 1910s ==
7 May 1911 Friendly	Select North France	3 – 1	(England) Old Malvernians	Lille, France
		Report

25 May 1911 UIAFA European Tournament semi-finals	Northern France (USFSA)	1 – 2	England AFA	Croix, France
17:00	?? 85'	Report	??	Stadium: Roubaix Stadium; Attendance: 4,000

28 May 1911 UIAFA European Tournament semi-finals	France A (USFSA)	1 – 4	(Czech Republic) Bohemia	Croix, France
16:00	Chandelier (1–2)	Report	Bělka (0–1); Košek (0–2); Medek (1–4)	Stadium: Roubaix Stadium; Attendance: 4,000; Referee: Gardner (England)

20 February 1912 Friendly	France	7 – 0	Catalonia	Colombes, France
		Report		Stadium: Stade de Colombes; Referee: (Scotland) Victor Gibson

1 December 1912 Friendly	Catalonia	1 – 0	France	Barcelona, Spain
	De la Riva	Report		Stadium: Camp de la Indústria; Referee: Hodge (England)

25 May 1913 Friendly	Spain (RUECF)	1 – 1	France (USFSA)	Hondarribia, Spain
16:30	Arzuaga 85'	Report	Eizaguirre 75' (o.g.)	Stadium: Estadio de Amute; Attendance: 5,000; Referee: José Ángel Berraondo (Spain)

1 November 1913 Friendly	Select France (USFSA)	1 – 4	(England) English Wanderers	Paris, France
		Report

=== Wartime matches ===
Probably because of the war period (World War I), the results of matches between 1915 and 1918 are not shown in official overviews. The Dutch newspaper De Telegraaf, however, listed three France–Belgium matches in this period together with the matches between 1905 and 1914, without noting a difference in status. Also in this period, they faced Italy twice as a France-Belgium representative team.

?? December 1914 Friendly	France	0 – 1	Belgium	Paris, France

1 January 1915 Friendly	Italy	6 – 2	France-Belgium representative team	Milan, Italy
	Fresia 9', 13', 50'; Cevenini I 24'; Cevenini III 84', 87'		Vialmonteli 36' van Hege 76'	Stadium: San Siro; Referee: Umberto Meazza (Italy)

3 January 1915 Friendly	Italy	2 – 3	France-Belgium representative team	Turin, Italy
	De Vecchi 10'; Santamaria 46'		Vialmonteli 19' van Hege 53', 80'	Stadium: Piazza d'armi Referee: Edoardo Pasteur (Italy)

?? March 1915 Friendly	France	0 – 3	Belgium	Paris, France

?? March 1916 Friendly	France	1 – 4	Belgium	Paris, France
	? (?)		Wertz (?) ? (?)	Attendance: 3,000; Referee: Scamoni (Italy)

22 April 1918 Friendly	France	2 – 5	Belgium	Paris, France
	? (?)		? (?)	Stadium: Stade Bauer; Attendance: 3,000; Referee: Haworth (England)
Note: Albert I, King of the Belgians handed out a cup trophy for the winners.

=== 1919 Inter-Allied Games ===
In the summer of 1919, France participated in the Inter-Allied Games in Paris, on the occasion of the celebration of the Allied victory in World War I. Nine players from this side played for the main team and five participated in the 1920 Summer Games in the following year. They comfortably beat Romania and Greece, before beating Italy 2–0 in the final group match to secure a place in the final, where they were beaten 2–3 by Czechoslovakia.

25 June 1919 Inter-Allied Games group stage	France	4 – 0	Romania	Paris, France
	Nicolas; Gastiger; Rénier	Report		Stadium: Stade Pershing; Referee: J. Mauro (Italy)

26 June 1919 Inter-Allied Games group stage	France	11 – 0	Greece	Paris, France
	Nicolas; Rénier; Dubly; Darjeu; Petit	Report		Stadium: Stade Pershing

28 June 1919 Inter-Allied Games group stage	France	2 – 0	Italy	Paris, France
	Gamblin (?); Nicolas (?)	Report		Stadium: Stade Pershing

28 June 1919 Inter-Allied Games Final	France	2 – 3	Czechoslovakia	Paris, France
	Deydier 12'; Rénier 28'	Report	Vanik 31'; Janda 84', 90'	Stadium: Stade Pershing; Attendance: 25,000; Referee: (United States) McKenzie

== 1920s ==
6 February 1921 Friendly	Catalonia	5–1	(Aquitaine) South West France	Barcelona, Catalonia
	Alcántara; Domènech; Mallorquí	Report	Bourbon	Stadium: Camp Muntaner

9 February 1921 Friendly	Catalonia	3–1	(Aquitaine) South West France	Barcelona, Catalonia
	Sancho; Blanco	Report	Bourbon	Stadium: Camp Muntaner

26 June 1921 Friendly	Slovenia (Kingdom of Yugoslavia)	0 – 5	France	Ljubljana, Kingdom of Yugoslavia
		Report	Nicolas 24', 47'; Dubly 44'; Boyer 78'; Rouchez 87'	Referee: Kerber (AUT)

6 June 1922 Friendly	Rogaland	3 – 2	France	Norway

11 June 1922 Friendly	Norway	7 – 0	France	Oslo, Norway
		Report		Stadium: Gressbanen

29 April 1924 Friendly	Select France	1 – 1	(England) Clapton Orient	Paris, France
		Report

22 May 1924 Friendly	France XI	2 – 1	(England) West Ham United	Paris, France
		Report

16 March 1925 Friendly	France	2 – 7	(Brazil) Club Athletico Paulistano	Montrouge, France
				Stadium: Stade Buffalo

19 March 1925 Friendly	France	0 – 0	(Uruguay) Nacional Montevideo	Montrouge, France
				Stadium: Stade Buffalo

10 May 1925 Friendly	Catalonia	2–1	(Languedoc) South East France	Barcelona, Spain
	Martínez; Cros		Kramer	Stadium: Guinardó; Referee: (Catalonia) Josep Llovera

4 June 1925 Friendly	France	0 – 6	(Uruguay) Nacional Montevideo	Paris, France
				Stadium: Stade Bergeyre

2 May 1926 Friendly	Select North France	3 – 2	(England) University of Kent	Tourcoing, France
		Report

== 1930s ==
10 July 1930 Friendly	Romania	2 – 4	France	Montevideo, Uruguay
		Report
Note: Match held as a warm-up for the upcoming 1930 World Cup.

?? July 1930 Friendly	Nacional Montevideo (Uruguay)	2 – 3	France	Montevideo, Uruguay
				Stadium: Estadio Gran Parque Central

30 July 1930 Friendly	Santos FC (Brazil)	6 – 1	France	São Paulo, Brazil
	Feitiço; Seixas	Report	Delfour	Stadium: Estádio Urbano Caldeira; Referee: Eneas Sgarzi

1 August 1930 Friendly	Brazil	3 – 2	France	Rio de Janeiro, Brazil
	Heitor 21', 50'; Friedenreich 40'		Delfour 6', 18'

26 January 1933 Friendly	Select France	3 – 1	(England) Bristol Rovers	Paris, France
		Report

22 April 1934 Friendly	Select North France	2 – 3	(England) Sunderland	Lille, France
		Report

27 May 1934 Friendly	Select North France	4 – 2	(England) Celtic	Lille, France
		Report

31 March 1935 Friendly	Select North France	1 – 1	(England) Clyde	Lille, France
		Report

1 December 1935 Friendly	Select North France	3 – 2	(England) Sheffield Wednesday	Lille, France
		Report

15 December 1936 Friendly	Select North France	5 – 1	(England) Sunderland	Lille, France
		Report

11 April 1937 Friendly	Select France	2 – 5	(England) Charlton Athletic	Paris, France
		Report

6 May 1937 Friendly	Select France	0 – 2	(England) Isthmian League XI	Le Havre, France
		Report

30 April 1939 Friendly	Select France Amateur	7 – 3	(England) Athenian League XI	Amiens, France
		Report

== 1960s ==
12 February 1969 Friendly	France	2 – 2	Hungary	Lyon, France
		Report

== 1970s ==
18 January 1971 Friendly	Coritiba FC (Brazil)	2 – 1	France	Curitiba, Brazil
				Stadium: Estádio Belford Duarte

21 January 1971 Friendly	SC Internacional (Brazil)	1 – 3	France	Porto Alegre, Brazil
				Stadium: Estádio Beira-Rio

24 January 1971 Friendly	Club Universitario de Deportes (Peru)	0 – 0	France	Lima, Peru

23 April 1974 Friendly	France	1 – 0	(Netherlands) Ajax Amsterdam	Paris, France
				Stadium: Parc des Princes; Attendance: 37,000

20 August 1974 Friendly	France	0 – 0	(Germany) FC Köln	Paris, France
				Stadium: Parc des Princes; Attendance: 25,667

19 August 1975 Friendly	France	3 – 1	(Spain) Real Madrid	Paris, France
	Michel 16'; Rocheteau 32', 60'	Report1; Report2	Santillana 51'	Stadium: Parc des Princes; Attendance: 35,000; Referee: M. Wurtz (France)
Note: The average age of the starting lineup was 25 years and 8 months

24 August 1976 Friendly	France	5 – 0	(Germany) Borussia Mönchengladbach	Paris, France
				Stadium: Parc des Princes; Attendance: 40,000

2 February 1977 Friendly	France	2 – 0	Romania	Bordeaux, France
		Report

3 July 1977 Friendly	Atlético Mineiro (Brazil)	3 – 1	France	Belo Horizonte, Brazil
				Stadium: Mineirão

24 August 1977 Friendly	France	4 – 2	(Germany) Hamburger SV	Paris, France
				Stadium: Parc des Princes; Attendance: 45,830

12 August 1978 Friendly	France	1 – 0	(Belgium) RSC Anderlecht	Paris, France
				Stadium: Parc des Princes

21 August 1979 Friendly	France	4 – 1	(Germany) FC Bayern Munich	Paris, France
				Stadium: Parc des Princes; Attendance: 36,000

== 1980s ==
3 September 1980 Friendly	France	1 – 0	(Italy) Juventus FC	Paris, France
				Stadium: Parc des Princes; Attendance: 43,000

18 August 1981 Friendly	France	1 – 3	(Germany) VfB Stuttgart	Paris, France
				Stadium: Parc des Princes; Attendance: 36,000

29 May 1982 Friendly	FC Andorra	1 – 2	France	Andorra la Vella, Andorra

6 June 1982 Friendly	France	2 – 0	FC Andorra	Font-Romeu, France

11 June 1982 Friendly	Real Sociedad (Basque Country (autonomous community))	1 – 3	France	San Sebastián, Spain
	Kortabarria 33' (pen.)	Report	Rocheteau 32'; Platini 38'; Lacombe 38'	Stadium: Atotxa; Attendance: 7,000; Referee: Joaquín Urio (Spain)

24 August 1983 Friendly	France	1 – 0	(Uruguay) Peñarol Montevideo	Toulouse, France
				Stadium: Stadium; Attendance: 10,438

26 May 1984 Friendly	FC Andorra	0 – 9	France	Andorra la Vella, Andorra

29 May 1984 Friendly	France	5 – 1	FC Andorra	Font-Romeu, France

5 September 1984 Friendly	France	0 – 1	(Italy) FC Inter Milan	Paris, France
				Stadium: Parc des Princes; Attendance: 16,351

21 May 1986 Friendly	Guatemala	1 – 8	France	Tlaxcala, Mexico
				Stadium: Estadio Tlahuicole; Attendance: 3,000

24 May 1986 Friendly	Mexico U20	1 – 1	France	Tlaxcala, Mexico
				Stadium: Estadio Tlahuicole; Attendance: 5,000

28 May 1986 Friendly	Club Universidad Nacional (Mexico)	2 – 0	France	Tlaxcala, Mexico
				Stadium: Estadio Tlahuicole; Attendance: 9,000

14 February 1989 Friendly	Arsenal FC (England)	2 – 0	France	London, England
				Stadium: Highbury Stadium; Attendance: 21,735

== 1990s ==
19 January 1993 Friendly	Sporting CP (Portugal)	0 – 2	France	Lisbon, Portugal
				Stadium: Estádio José Alvalade; Attendance: 10,000

30 May 1999 Friendly	France	2 – 2	(France) Papin XI	Marseille, France
				Stadium: Stade Velodrome
Note: Jean-Pierre Papin testimonial

== 2000s ==
16 August 2000 Friendly	France	5 – 1	FIFA World XI	Marseille, France
	Trezeguet 11', 27', 46'; Pires 56'; Anelka 78'	Report	R. Baggio 79' (pen.)	Stadium: Stade Velodrome; Attendance: 60,000; Referee: Mohammed Guezzaz (Morocco)
Note: Charity Match for SOS Children's Villages. Even though the opponent wasn't an official team, the match is considered official by the FFF.
