= Romania national football team results (unofficial matches) =

Win Draw Loss

This is a list of the Romania national football team's unofficial results, including Romania B from their inception to the present day that are not accorded the status of official internationals. Player appearances and goals in these matches are also not counted to their total.

== 1919 ==
24 June 1919 Interallied Games	Romania	0 – 4	France Military	Paris, France
	Nicolas; Gastiger; Rénier	Report		Stadium: Pershing Stadium

26 June 1919 Interallied Games	Romania	1 – 7	Italy Military	Paris, France
	Ermanno Aebi (?); Cevenini	Report	Mares (?)	Stadium: Pershing Stadium

28 June 1919 Interallied Games	Romania	2 – 3	Greece Military	Paris, France
		Report		Stadium: Pershing Stadium

== 1927 ==
18 April 1927 Friendly	Select Romania	2 – 2	(England) Oxford City	Bucharest, Romania
		Report

== 1930s ==
10 July 1930 Friendly	Romania	2 – 4	France	Montevideo, Uruguay

25 May 1938 Friendly	Select Romania	2 – 2	(England) Preston North End	Bucharest, Romania
		Report

21 May 1939 Friendly	Romania	3 – 0	Estonia	Bucharest, Romania
	Moldoveanu 45'; Kovacs 58'; Ene 72'	Report		Stadium: Stadionul Venus; Referee: Maxmillian Schneider

== 1952 ==
24 June 1952	CDSA	3–1	Romania	Moscow
	Ilyin; Nikolayev	Report	Bodo	Stadium: Central Dynamo Stadium; Attendance: 50,000

== 1959 ==
10 July 1959 Friendly	Romania	2 – 1	China	Oradea, Romania
	Ene 56'		Zhang 22'

19 July 1959 Friendly	Romania	1 – 1	China	Bucharest, Romania
				Referee: Puiu Rapaport (Romania)

== 1964 ==
11 October 1964 Friendly	Algeria	0 – 0	Romania	Algiers, Algeria
		Report		Stadium: Stade du 5 Juillet 1962

== 1970 ==
22 April 1970 Friendly	Mexico	3 – 2	Romania	Mexico City, Mexico
	Díaz 31'	Report	Tătaru 8', 61'	Attendance: 20,000; Referee: Arturo Yamasaki (Peru)

26 April 1970 Friendly	Mexico	3 – 2	Romania	Mexico City, Mexico
	Basaguren 18'; Valdivia 30'; Rivas 58'	Report	Tătaru 7', 62'	Stadium: Estadio Azteca; Attendance: 23,000; Referee: Abel Aguilar Elizalde (Mexico)

28 April 1970 Friendly	El Salvador	2 – 2	Romania	San Salvador, El Salvador
	Martínez 13', 88'	Report	Vigu 15'; Grozea 18'	Attendance: 20,000; Referee: Juan Jose Coardo

30 April 1970 Friendly	El Salvador	0 – 2	Romania	San Salvador, El Salvador
		Report	Tătaru 62', 81'	Attendance: 25,000; Referee: La Bojosquez

== 1971 ==
27 October 1971 Friendly	Romania	1 – 1	Bulgaria	Bucharest, Romania

== 1977 ==
2 February 1977 Friendly	France	2 – 0	Romania	Bordeaux, France

22 September 1977 Friendly	Kuwait	0 – 1	Romania	Kuwait
		Report	Nedelcu II	Attendance: 15,000

== 1978 ==
4 August 1978 Friendly	Bulgaria	2 – 0	Romania	Varna, Bulgaria

August 1978 Friendly	F.C. Baia Mare	3 – 1	Romania	Constanța, Romania

== 1979 ==
7 February 1979 Friendly	Bulgaria	1 – 1	Romania	Stanke Dimitrov, Bulgaria

14 February 1979 Friendly	Bulgaria	2 – 1	Romania	Blagoevgrad, Bulgaria

== 1982 ==
12 October 1982 Friendly	Romania	2 – 1	Bulgaria Olympic	Bucharest, Romania

== 1984 ==
18 January 1984 Friendly	Romania	1 – 2	China	Calcutta, India
	Sertov 85'		Li Fui 36'; Lü Hongxiang

24 August 1984 Amsterdam Tournament	Ajax (Netherlands)	1 – 0	Romania	Amsterdam, Netherlands
	Boeve 90'	Report		Stadium: De Meer Stadion

26 August 1984 Amsterdam Tournament	Feyenoord (Netherlands)	3 – 1	Romania	Amsterdam, Netherlands
	Houtman 24'; Pétursson 51'; Hoekstra 53'	Report	Coraș	Stadium: De Meer Stadion

5 December 1984 Friendly	Greece	2 – 1	Romania	Athens, Greece

== 1985 ==
25 June 1985 Great Wall Tour	China	2 – 2 (3 – 5 p)	Romania	Shanghai, China
			Cireașă (??); Muzsnai (??)

== 1987 ==
10 June 1987 1988 Olympics Q	Denmark	8 – 0	Romania	Aalborg, Denmark
	Nielsen 6', 66', 82'; Moseby 28'; Kristensen 30'; Olsen 51'; Povlsen 77'; Jensen 79'	Report		Stadium: Aalborg Stadium; Attendance: 10,300; Referee: Dimitar Sharlachki (Bulgaria)

== 1990 ==
21 March 1990 Friendly	Basque Country	2 – 2	Romania	Bilbao, Spain
00:00 CET	Goikoetxea 29'; Urrutia 40'		Rotariu 34'; Balint 65'	Stadium: San Mamés; Attendance: 10,000; Referee: Urizar Azpitarte (Spain)

26 December 1990 Friendly	Croatia	2 – 0	Romania	Rijeka, Croatia

== 1991 ==
13 January 1991 Nehru Cup	India	0 – 3	Romania	Thiruvananthapuram, India
		Report

16 January 1991 Nehru Cup	Romania	4 – 1	Soviet Union	Thiruvananthapuram, India
		Report

18 January 1991 Nehru Cup	Romania	3 – 1	Zambia	Thiruvananthapuram, India
		Report

21 January 1991 Nehru Cup	Romania	1 – 1	Hungary	Thiruvananthapuram, India
		Report

25 January 1991 Nehru Cup	Romania	2 – 0	China	Thiruvananthapuram, India
	Predatu (??)	Report		Stadium: Trivandrum International Stadium; Referee: Christian K Chikuka (Zambia)

27 January 1991 Nehru Cup	Romania	3 – 1	Hungary	Thiruvananthapuram, India
	Răduță 24'; Stan 53'; Vlădoiu 88'	Report	Váczi 77' (pen.)

17 April 1991 Friendly	Brazil	1 – 0	Romania	Londrina, Brazil
	Moacir 52'	Report		Stadium: Estádio do Café; Attendance: 37,199; Referee: Renato Marsiglia (Brazil)

14 July 1991 Marlboro Cup	China	0 – 1	Romania	Shanghai, China
		Report	Iftodi 82'

== 1992 ==
1 July 1992 Marlboro Cup	China	0 – 3	Romania	Shanghai, China
		Report

== 1993 ==
21 January 1993 Nehru Cup	Romania	1 – 1	Russia	Madras, India
	Craioveanu 5'	Report	Sabitov 16'	Stadium: Jawaharlal Nehru Stadium

23 January 1993 Nehru Cup	Romania	2 – 0	Bolivia	Madras, India
	Strizu 32'; Craioveanu 62'	Report		Stadium: Jawaharlal Nehru Stadium

27 January 1993 Nehru Cup	Romania	3 – 3	North Korea	Madras, India
	Craioveanu 52'; Luca 54'; Militaru 60'	Report	Choi Won Nam 29'; Choi Yong Son 42'; Unknown 60'	Stadium: Jawaharlal Nehru Stadium

1 February 1993 Nehru Cup	Cameroon	0 – 4	Romania	Madras, India
		Report	Cr. Pușcaș 16'; V. Ștefan 39'; Zmoleanu 45'; Craioveanu 50' (pen.)	Stadium: Jawaharlal Nehru Stadium; Referee: Sagar Sen (India)

3 February 1993 Nehru Cup	North Korea	2 – 0	Romania	Madras, India
	Choi Yong Son 39'; Kim Gwang Min 78'	Report		Stadium: Jawaharlal Nehru Stadium; Referee: Sumantha Ghosh (India)

== 1994 ==
10 February 1994 Carlsberg Cup	Hong Kong	1 – 1 (5 – 4 p)	Romania	Hong Kong
	Tempest 77'		Dumitrescu 63'	Stadium: Government Stadium; Attendance: 9,000; Referee: Samuel Chan Yam-Ming (Hong Kong)

== 1995 ==
27 September 1995 Friendly	Brazil	2 – 2	Romania	Belo Horizonte, Brazil
	Marques 4'; Sávio 19'	Report	Vasc 18'; Butoiu 45'	Attendance: 9,000

== 1996 ==
4 February 1996 Friendly	Qatar	2 – 3	Romania	Doha, Qatar
	Al-Enazi 51'; Mustafa 56'	Report	Lăcătuș 22'; Vlădoiu 23'; Dănciulescu 65'	Attendance: 7,000; Referee: Hasan Jawhar Qatar

9 February 1996 King's Cup	Romania	2 – 2	Denmark League	Bangkok, Thailand
	Vlădoiu 20' (pen.); Prodan 45'	Report	Laursen 36'; E. Bo Andersen 74'	Attendance: 5,000

11 February 1996 King's Cup	Romania	3 – 0	Thailand	Bangkok, Thailand
	A. Ilie 2', 61', 83'	Report		Attendance: 20,000

13 February 1996 King's Cup	Romania	1 – 1	Finland	Bangkok, Thailand
	Filipescu 36'	Report	Koskinen 15'	Attendance: 15,000

16 February 1996 King's Cup	Romania	2 – 1	Denmark League	Bangkok, Thailand
	Popescu 9', 45'	Report	Højer 90'	Attendance: 15,000

20 December 1996 Friendly	Egypt	3 – 1	Romania	Egypt

== 2000 ==
19 January 2000 Friendly	Mexico	3 – 1	Romania	Monterrey, Mexico
	Pardo 20'; Méndez 33'; Abundis 47'	Report	Dăscălescu 4'	Stadium: Estadio Tecnologico; Attendance: 40,000; Referee: Olger Mejias Ovares (Mexico)

30 May 2000 Friendly	Brittany	canceled	Romania	Nantes, France
Note: Game agreed but not played because of then French FA administration (1999–2005).

== 2002 ==
3 January 2002 Friendly	Kuwait	1 – 1	Romania	Kuwait
	Al-Huwaidi 22'	Report	M. Niculae 69' (pen.)

12 May 2002 Friendly	Greece	3 – 2	Romania	Alexandroupoli, Greece
	Nikolaidis 19'; Giannakopoulos 59'; Konstantinidis 73'	Report	Drăgan 57'; Tănasă 83'	Stadium: Stadion Alexandroupoli

== 2004 ==
19 February 2004 Cyprus Tournament	Romania	2 – 0	Belarus	Nicosia, Cyprus
	Dănciulescu 32' (pen.); D. Niculae 49'

21 February 2004 Cyprus Tournament	Romania	3 – 0	Hungary	Nicosia, Cyprus
	Mihuț 11'; Dănciulescu 89'; Caramarin 90+2'			Stadium: GSP Stadium; Attendance: 1,200; Referee: Kapitanis (Cyprus)

== 2008 ==
5 December 2008 Friendly	Steaua București (Romania)	1 – 4	Romania	Bucharest, Romania
14:00	Arthuro 29'		48', 51', 75' Bucur; 65' Bicfalvi	Stadium: Stadionul Steaua; Attendance: 0 (close doors); Referee: Alexandru Tudor (Romania)

== 2013 ==
2 February 2013 Friendly	Romania	1 – 4	Poland	Málaga, Spain
	Grozav 41'		Pawłowski 15'; Teodorczyk 24', 28'; Łukasik 33'

== 2015 ==
14 February 2015 Friendly	Romania	2 – 1	Moldova	Aksu, Turkey
	Popa 21'; Lazăr 86'	Report	Carp 9'	Stadium: Mardan Sports Complex; Attendance: 150; Referee: Mikhail Vilkov (Russia)
