= Ernest Hillard =

English clerk, soldier, and footballer

Personal information
- Full name: Ernest Hillard
- Place of birth: England
- Position: Forward

Senior career*
Years	Team	Apps	(Gls)
????–1914	Romanian-American; Society		
1918–1922	Tricolor București		

International career
1919	Romania	3	(0)
- * Club domestic league appearances and goals

Ernest Hillard was an English clerk, soldier, and footballer. After settling in Romania in 1906, he played football for the Romanian-American Society, the Tricolor București, and was a member of the first-ever version of the Romania national team in 1919, which participated in the football tournament of the Inter-Allied Games in Paris.

== Biography ==
Born in England, Hillard settled in Romania in or before 1906, as a clerk at the Concordia-Vega Refinery in Ploiești. He played football for the Romanian-American Society until the outbreak of World War I in 1914, in which he fought on the front lines with the Romanian uniform.

In June 1919, Hillard was a member of the Romanian committee that went to the Inter-Allied Games in Paris, a large sports competition organized in celebration of the Allied victory in the War. Hillard was listed as a member of the football team, whose squad was formed by soldiers who had participated in the War and who was drawn almost exclusively from Bucharest clubs, such as Coltea, Venus, and Tricolor. Hillard was one of only two foreigners who played for Romania's football team, the other being the German Rudolf Schmetau, a sergeant originally from the rugby section. He was thus one of the eleven footballers who played in the first unofficial match in the history of the Greater Romania national team, starting as a forward in a 0–4 loss to France. Thanks to his knowledge of English football, which at the time was much more advanced than the rest of Continental Europe, Hillard might have acted as some sort of coach of the football team, who played in the 1-2-3-5 formula, dominant at that time in world football. Romania lost all three group matches, 0–4 to France, 1–5 to Italy, and 2–3 to Greece, losing the latter despite having played better. These matches played in the tournament are not included in the official FIFA register, and Romania only made its official debut three years later.

Together with Lieutenant Dinicu Georgescu and Constantin Rădulescu, who also participated at the 1919 Games, Hillard was a member of the Tricolor București team that won the 1920–21 Romanian Championship. This season marked the last time in which the championship was contested only by teams from the Old Kingdom, since in the following year, it was expanded to feature teams from across the entire territory of Greater Romania.

On 9 April 1922, Hillard started in the first inter-capitals match held in Romania, between selections of Bucharest and Belgrade, which had a record number of spectators, around 7000, and which ended in a 2–2 draw.

== Honours ==
Tricolor București

- Divizia A:
  - Champions (1): 1920–21
