= Paul Prehn =

Wrestler

- Born: Paul Henry Prehn; September 5, 1892; Mason City, Iowa
- Died: May 7, 1973 (aged 80); Champaign, Illinois
- Occupation: University of Illinois Head Wrestling Coach
- Years active: 1920–1928, Winning 7 out of 9 Big Ten Championships
- Notable work: Scientific Methods of Wrestling, 1925
- Title: Illinois State Athletic Commission Chairman
- Term: January 3, 1928
- Spouse: Alyene Elizabeth Westall (1929–1955)
- Children: Paul Prehn, Jr.
- Relatives: (Grandchildren) Paul Prehn, III; John (“Toby”) Prehn; and Don Prehn
- Awards: Gold Medal for Wrestling Middleweight Div., Inter-Allied Games, 1910
- Military career
- Allegiance: United States of America
- Branch: Iowa National Guard
- Service years: 1916–1919
- Unit: Hand to Hand Combat Instructor
- Conflicts: Border War (1910–19)

Paul Henry Prehn (September 5, 1892 – May 7, 1973) was a wrestler from Mason City, Iowa, in the early part of the 20th century. He served in the Iowa National Guard during the Border War (1910–19) (as a hand-to-hand combat instructor). In 1919, Prehn won the middleweight gold medal at the Inter-Allied Games held in Paris at the Pershing Stadium. From 1920 to 1928, Prehn was the head wrestling coach at the University of Illinois at Urbana-Champaign winning 7 out of 9 Big 10 Championships, and ending with a Win/Loss record: 42-5-0 (a record which remains the highest win percentage for any wrestling coach in the history of the University of Illinois). Prehn was a member of the Illinois State Athletic Commission (later elected Chairman on January 3, 1928) and also Ring Commissioner for The Long Count Fight between Gene Tunney and Jack Dempsey at Soldier Field (September 22, 1927). On October 27, 1928, Prehn was elected President of the National Boxing Association (now known as the World Boxing Association). Prehn also authored Scientific Methods of Wrestling in 1925 (which is still in print today).

== Early life ==
=== The start of wrestling ===
Paul Prehn was born in Mason City, Iowa on September 5, 1892. His parents were onion farmers and Prehn hated farming from a young age. To get away from the farm work, he got a job at the local stone quarry at the age of 12. The owner of the stone quarry also had a wrestling gym and started training Prehn. In 1908, at age 16 and weighing only 140 pounds, Prehn's first professional bout (and also the main event) was with a 185-pound professional grappler named Anderson in the old Parker Opera house in Mason City, Iowa. Rules of the match said that Anderson was to throw his young opponent twice in an hour. Surprisingly, Prehn dominated the match and pinned Anderson's shoulders to the mat in 33 minutes. After this match, Prehn was a main event headliner for wrestling competitions throughout the Midwest during his late teens and early 20s

In 1916, Prehn joined the Iowa National Guard and was stationed at Camp Dodge. A few months later, Prehn was deployed by the U.S. Army to an area near Brownsville, Texas where Prehn served as a hand-to-hand combat instructor during the Border War (1910–19) between the United States and Pancho Villa.

=== Middleweight Gold Medalist at Allied Olympics ===
In 1919, Prehn competed in the Inter-Allied Games at Stade Pershing Stadium in Paris and won the gold medal for wrestling in the middleweight division. Prehn was one of only 12 American servicemen to win gold medals at the games, including future boxing legend Gene Tunney and future middleweight wrestling champion of the world, Ralph Parcaut.

== Career ==
=== Head coach at the University of Illinois ===
Prehn was the head wrestling coach at the University of Illinois from 1920 to 1928 winning 7 out of 9 Big Ten Championships, and ending with a Win/Loss record: 42-5-0 reflecting an 89.4% win percentage, the highest win percentage in the history of the University of Illinois' wrestling program and among the highest in collegiate wrestling history. (Dan Gable's win percentage was 93%.)

Aside from being an excellent wrestler and coach, Prehn was also good friends with University of Illinois head football coach, Bob Zuppke. Prehn suggested to Zuppke that his football players could improve their athletic strength, coordination and speed by joining the University of Illinois at Urbana-Champaign wrestling team (becoming “two-sport” athletes). Zuppke agreed with Prehn and encouraged his football players (this was the era of Red Grange) to join Prehn's wrestling team and as a result, Prehn had a large roster of talent and this was one reason for his success. Of course, Zuppke benefited from this arrangement as well, as many of his football players were wrestling which helped them stay in top physical condition throughout the year (many of these University of Illinois football players/wrestlers went on to play for the George Halas Chicago Bears.

=== Commissioner of the Tunney/Dempsey Long Count Fight/Death Threat From Al Capone ===
Prehn was a member of the Illinois State Athletic Commission (later elected Chairman on January 3, 1928) and also Ring Commissioner for The Long Count Fight between Tunney and Dempsey at Soldier Field (September 22, 1927). Prior to the Tunney/Dempsey boxing event (which had 120,000 in attendance and is the largest attendance ever for a sporting event outside motor racing, and soccer), gangsters affiliated with Al Capone tried to bribe Prehn with $10,000 in return for Prehn appointing a “pro Dempsey” referee for the fight. Prehn refused the bribe and then instructed several of the potential referees (including Capone's preferred referee) to sit at ringside and be ready to referee the fight. Then, only after the fighters had entered the ring, Prehn chose Dave Barry as the referee (not the referee that was demanded by Al Capone). Then, as a result of Dempsey losing the fight (and the controversy over the referee's long count), Al Capone's gangsters told Prehn he would be murdered although inexplicably no attempts were ever made on Prehn's life. (Prehn kept a pistol under his pillow many years afterward.)

=== President of the National Boxing Association ===
On October 27, 1928, Prehn was elected President of the National Boxing Association and referred to in one article at that time as “the biggest man in boxing” which was probably an exaggeration but does reflect the preeminence of the National Boxing Association to the sport at that time.

== Author ==
In 1925, Prehn wrote Scientific Methods of Wrestling. This book covers wrestling and grappling holds that were popular in the "no holds barred" wrestling events that Prehn participated in as a young man in the Midwest. Unlike collegiate wrestling (which has rules against chokes, arm bars and many other techniques), the no holds barred wrestling rules were more similar to the mixed martial arts grappling which has become popular in recent years (and this is one reason why there has been a resurgence in interest in Prehn's book today).

== Later life ==
In his later years, Prehn was active in Illinois politics and operated two popular restaurants at the University of Illinois campus (“Prehn’s On Oregon” and “Prehn’s On Green”). Prehn was also married and had one son, Paul Prehn, Jr. and 3 grandsons, Paul Prehn, III, John (“Toby”) Prehn and Don Prehn. Prehn died on May 7, 1973.
