= Quin Ryan =

American radio broadcaster (1898–1978)

- Born: Quinlan Augustus Ryan; November 17, 1898; Chicago, Illinois, U.S.
- Died: October 7, 1978 (aged 67); Chicago, Illinois, U.S.
- Education: Northwestern University
- Sports commentary career
- Teams: Chicago Cubs (1926–1930); Chicago White Sox (1927–1930); Green Bay Packers (1931)
- Sports: Major League Baseball; College football Boxing

Quinlan Augustus Ryan (November 17, 1898 – October 7, 1978) was an American radio broadcaster who was a sportscaster, news reporter, host, and executive for WGN in Chicago from 1924 to 1941. He covered Scopes trial and four United States presidential elections and was a play-by-play announcer for the station's college football, Major League Baseball, and boxing broadcasts.

== Early life ==
Ryan was born on November 17, 1898, in Chicago. His father, Joseph E. Ryan, was a judge of the Municipal Court of Chicago. Ryan graduated from Northwestern University in 1920.

== Writing ==
Ryan began his career in journalism as a Northwestern campus correspondent for the Chicago Tribune. After graduating, he remained with the paper as a sportswriter. He also worked as an advertising writer, and book reviewer, contributed to the paper's "A Line o' Type or Two" column, filled in for Ring Lardner on "In The Wake of the News", and edited The Tribune employee newsletter.

== Radio ==
In 1922, Ryan left The Tribune to write a weekly radio program for Balaban and Katz, a Chicago-based movie theater chain. He made his first on-air appearance in 1923, when he promoted a fundraising campaign. In 1924, the Tribune purchased WDAP, which it renamed WGN. Ryan became WGN's manager and provided commentary for the station's sports and theatrical programming. He gave up his management position in 1929 to focus on broadcasting, but became station manager again in 1931 following the departure of Henry Selinger.

=== Sports ===
Ryan was the play-by-play announcer for WGN's college football coverage, including many of Red Grange's Illinois Fighting Illini football games, the 1925 Rose Bowl, and the 1926 Army–Navy Game, which was played at Chicago's Soldier Field. In 1934, he called the inaugural Chicago Charities College All-Star Game for WGN and the NBC Radio Network.

In 1925, Ryan anchored the station's coverage of the Kentucky Derby and the Indianapolis 500, becoming the first announcer to broadcast those events.

Ryan and Graham McNamee called the 1925 World Series for Westinghouse Broadcasting. In 1926, Ryan began calling Chicago Cubs games after WGN secured the rights to broadcast their home opener as well as all of the team's Saturday games. In 1927, the American League ended its ban on radio broadcasts and Ryan began calling all of the home games for both the Cubs and Chicago White Sox. In 1931, Bob Elson took over WGN's baseball broadcasts. Elson and Ryan were part of Mutual Broadcasting System's broadcast team for the 1935 and 1938 World Series.

Ryan interviewing with Suzanne Lenglen and Charles C. Pyle in November 1926

Ryan also called a number of boxing matches for WGN. He hosted Old Time Prize Fights, which featured reenactments of a number of famous prizefights, including Jack Johnson vs. James J. Jeffries, Jefferies vs. Bob Fitzsimmons, and Johnson vs. Jess Willard. In 1927, he called the World Light Welterweight Championship bought between Mushy Callahan and Spug Myers from Wrigley Field. Later that year, he was the blow-by-blow announcer for the Jack Dempsey vs. Gene Tunney rematch at Soldier Field. He also called The Tribune-sponsored Chicago Golden Gloves tournament and the Inter-City Amateur boxing tournament, which featured the winners of the Chicago Golden Gloves facing the champions of the New York Golden Gloves. On September 20, 1934, Ryan and Paul Prehn were the announcers for World Heavyweight Wrestling Championship bout between Jim Londos and Ed "Strangler" Lewis at Wrigley Field, as well as the undercard boxing match between King Levinsky and Art Sykes.

In 1931, Ryan called Green Bay Packers' home games for WHBY in Green Bay, Wisconsin.

=== News ===
Ryan presented WGN's evening news broadcast, which consisted of him reading The Chicago Tribune. In 1937, he anchored WGN's first morning news program.

Ryan interviewing James Stephens in 1925

In 1925, Ryan anchored WGN's coverage of the Scopes trial. WGN aired live testimony, while Ryan, who was seated in the courtroom, provided clarifications and identified those who were speaking. Ryan was the only radio broadcaster to remain in Dayton, Tennessee throughout the trial, although WGN was unable to air the first day of the trial due to technical difficulties.

In 1928 and 1932, Ryan anchored the station's coverage of the Republican and Democratic National Conventions. He was the lead announcer for Mutual Broadcasting's convention coverage in 1936 and 1940. On Election Day, Ryan provided live election returns and interviews with Tribune writers.

Ryan also anchored WGN's coverage of Knute Rockne's funeral, the 1934 Illinois Republican Convention, the installation of archbishop Samuel Stritch, and Wendell Willkie acceptance of the Republican nomination in Elwood, Indiana.

=== Other work ===
In 1927, Ryan hosted "The Rambles of a Radio Announcer", a weekly program that featured him speaking about some of the interesting moments from his broadcasting career. He later performed a similar show on stage throughout the Midwestern United States.

Ryan hosted reenactments of a number of historical events, including the 1860 United States presidential election and the Great Chicago Fire. From 1932 to 1935, Ryan hosted Headlines of Other Days, a nightly program where he read newspaper articles from historic events, including the 1906 San Francisco earthquake and Hammond Circus train wreck.

Ryan hosted Uncle Quin's Punch and Judy Show, an evening show for children. In 1931, Ryan became the first person to broadcast a circus when he hosted a performance of the Sells Floto Circus.

Ryan hosted WGN's coverage of the Chicagoland Music Festival, which was picked up by the NBC Radio Network in 1931 and CBS Radio in 1932 and 1933, and the 1933–34 Century of Progress world's fair.

In 1934, Ryan was the master of ceremonies for a weekly variety show produced by Balaban and Katz. Its headline acts included Roxy and his Gang and Gloria Swanson. Later that year, he hosted a nightly interview program sponsored by initially by Thompson's Cafeteria and later by the Phillips Petroleum Company. This show was replaced by the Phillips 66 Amateur Show (also known as Quin Ryan's Amateur Night), a talent show also hosted by Ryan. In 1935, he was the master of ceremonies for Quin Ryan and his Cadets, a daytime program featuring songs performed by the Singing Cadets.

From 1935 to 1942, Ryan hosted Marriage License Romances. The program featured interviews with engaged and newlywed couples and was broadcast from the Cook County marriage licence bureau.

== Later life ==
In 1940, Ryan was removed from his management position by station owner Robert R. McCormick. He was replaced by the WGN's program and publicity director, Frank P. Schreiber. Ryan left the station nine months later to work as a freelancer. He was a frequent contributor to the Tribune's Sunday magazine.

Ryan died on October 7, 1978, in a Chicago nursing home. He was predeceased by his wife, Roberta Nangle, a former Tribune editor who died in 1944. He is buried at Calvary Cemetery in Evanston, Illinois.
