= Paul Nicolas =

French footballer (1899–1959)

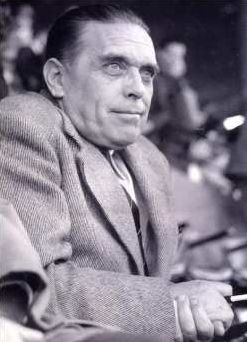
- Nicolas in 1957

Personal information
- Date of birth: 4 November 1899
- Place of birth: Saint-Mandé, France
- Date of death: 3 March 1959 (aged 59)
- Place of death: Gy-l'Évêque, France
- Position: Striker

Senior career*
Years	Team	Apps	(Gls)
–1916	Saint-Mandé Club		
1916–1919	Gallia Club		
1919–1929	Red Star Olympique		
1929–1935	Amiens SC		

International career
1919	France military	4	(7)
1920–1931	France	35	(20)

Managerial career
- 1949–1950: France
- 1954–1959: France (director)
- * Club domestic league appearances and goals

Paul Nicolas (4 November 1899 – 3 March 1959) was a French footballer who played as a striker. He was part of the France national football teams at the 1920, 1924, and 1928 Summer Olympics.

He was also part of the France national football team selection committee.

== Club career ==
Paul Nicolas lost his mother at the age of 3, and then his father in 1914. He was raised by his mother-in-law together with his brother Henri. He began his football career with Saint-Mandé Club in 1916. Initially, he played as a defender, but he quickly realized that his destiny laid at the forefront since he scored many goals. In addition to his goal-scoring instinct, Nicolas also stood out for his strong character on the pitch, and these two qualities combined eventually drew the attention of Mr. Fort, the then president of the Gallia Club, who signed him as a centre-forward in 1916.

At the time, center-forwards usually were corpulent, aggressive and impetuous players, but Nicolas revolutionized the way of playing as a forward striker, imposing his talent, his skill with both feet, and intuition to position himself in the right place, thus being described as a "precursor and prototype of the modern striker, scorer at heart but just as altruistic in the last gesture".

Paul Nicolas joined the army around the end of World War I, thus leaving for Paris. On 5 March 1919, while he was in the army, he met on the station platform a former brilliant captain of Red Star F.C.: Lucien Gamblin, who convinced him to join him at Red Star given his reputation as a skillful centre-forward. Nicolas proved to be a great recruitment as he went on to play a pivotal role in helping the club win the Coupe de France four times, including three in a row between 1921 and 1923, scoring once in the 1922 final to help his side to a 2–0 victory over Rennais. He helped the club win its fourth Coupe in 1928.

In 1929, Paul Nicolas left Red Star for family reasons and moved to Amiens where he opened a grocery store, which is why he joined Amiens SC, with whom he played for six years before ending his career in 1935, in the round of 16 of the 1934–35 Coupe de France, in which Amiens was eliminated by Red Star after a playoff match.

== International career ==
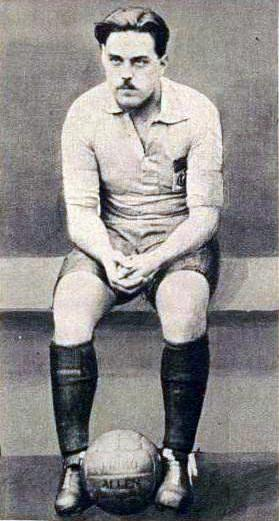
Paul Nicolas in 1924

He played in 44 matches for the France national team between 1920 and 1921, scoring a then national record of 20 goals. He participated in the football tournaments of three Olympic games (1920, 1924, and 1928), scoring a total of four goals in five games, including one against Uruguay, which was the best team at the time. Despite his great performances at the Olympics, the 31-year-old Paul Nicolas failed to participate in the inaugural tournament of the World Cup in 1930 to end his magnificent international career on a high.

This tally includes two hat-tricks, one in a 4–1 win over Yugoslavia on 13 June 1926, and the other to help his side to a 4–0 win over Northern Ireland on 21 February 1928.

In 1919, Nicolas took part in the Inter-Allied Games in Paris, a large sports competition organized in celebration of the Allied victory in World War I, since he was a member of the military. However, the matches of the tournament are not included in the official FIFA register. Together with the likes of Lucien Gamblin and Albert Rénier, he helped France win Group A with two goals against Romania (4–0), a poker against Greece (11–0) and a decisive goal against Greece (2–0). However, he failed to score in the final as they were beaten 2–3 by Czechoslovakia.

== Retirement ==
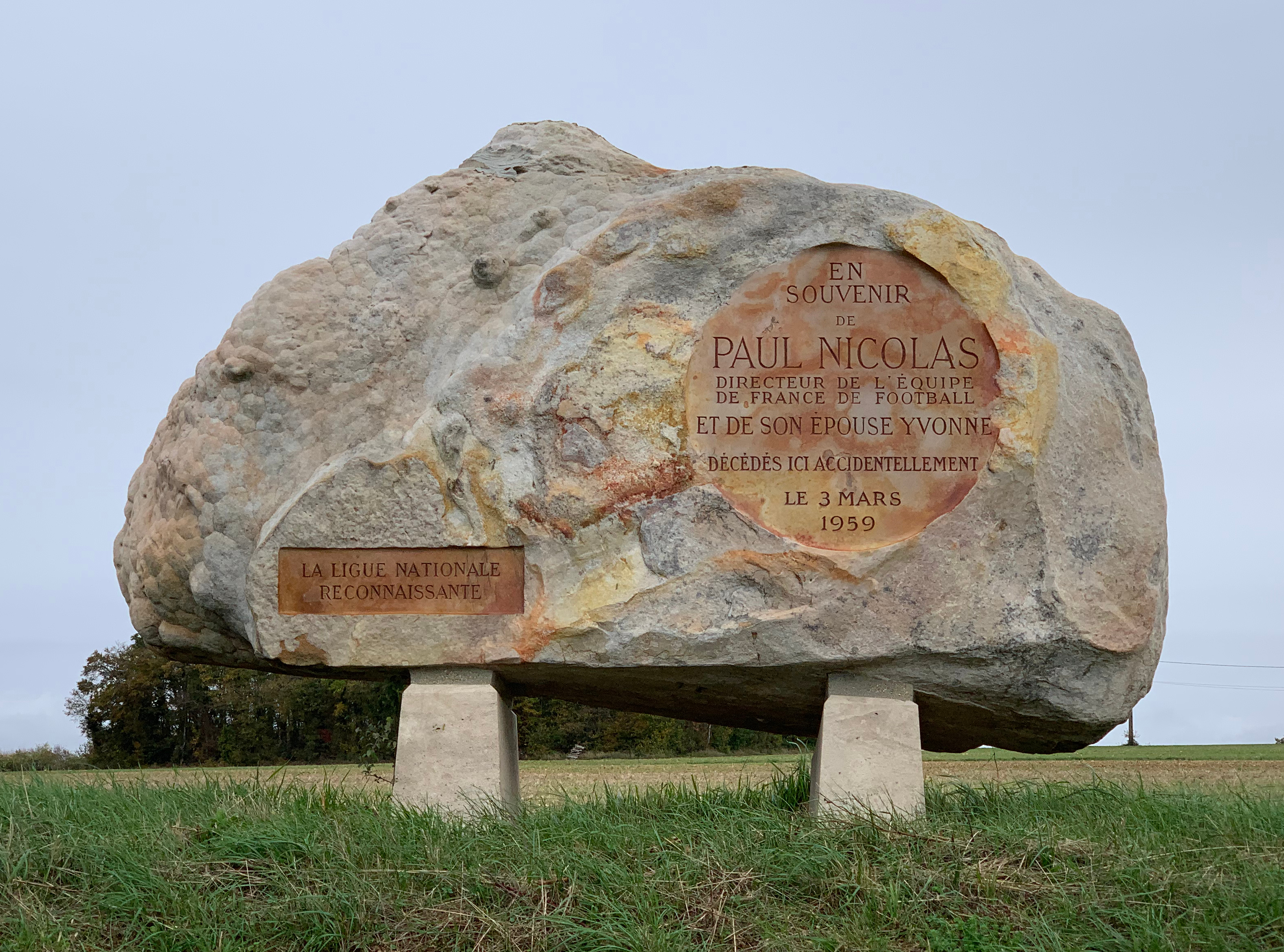
Memorial at Gy-l'Évêque where Paul Nicolas died in a road accident

A football lover, he could not bring himself to leave the world of football. Endowed with a strong personality, he joined the selection committee of the France national team in August 1949. He stayed there until December 1953, when, following the double disappearance of Emmanuel Gambardella and Georges Bayrou, he was appointed president of the Groupement des clubs authorized (the forerunner of the Ligue de Football Professionnel) — he would remain in this position until June 1956. He returned to the selection in September 1954 as "director of the France team", contributing to the team's third-place finish at the 1958 FIFA World Cup.

On his return from a disputed France-Belgium match in 1959 in Colombes, Paul Nicolas was the victim of a terrible car accident that cost him his life. His tragic death shook French football. Half a century later, his memory is still alive.

== International goals ==
France score listed first, score column indicates score after each Nicolas goal.

List of international goals scored by Paul Nicolas
No.	Date	Venue	Opponent	Score	Result	Competition
1	18 January 1920	Velodromo Sempione, Milan, Italy	Italy	1–3	4–9	Friendly
2	29 February 1920	Parc des Sports, Geneva, Switzerland	Switzerland	2–0	2–0	Friendly
3	28 March 1920	Parc des Princes, Paris, France	Belgium	1–1	2–1	Friendly
4	28 March 1920	Parc des Princes, Paris, France	Belgium	2–1	2–1	Friendly
5	29 August 1920	Olympisch Stadion, Antwerp, Belgium	Italy	2–0	3–1	1920 Summer Olympics Quarter-finals
6	22 April 1923	Stade Pershing, Paris, France	Switzerland	2–2	2–2	Friendly
7	27 May 1924	Stade Bauer, Saint-Ouen, France	Latvia	2–0	7–0	1924 Summer Olympics Round of 16
8	27 May 1924	Stade Bauer, Saint-Ouen, France	Latvia	4–0	7–0	1924 Summer Olympics Round of 16
9	1 June 1924	Stade Yves-du-Manoir, Colombes, France	Uruguay	1–1	1–5	1924 Summer Olympics Quarter-finals
10	25 April 1926	Stade Yves-du-Manoir, Colombes, France	Switzerland	1–0	1–0	Friendly
11	13 June 1926	Stade Yves-du-Manoir, Colombes, France	Yugoslavia	2–0	4–1	Friendly
12	13 June 1926	Stade Yves-du-Manoir, Colombes, France	Yugoslavia	3–1	4–1	Friendly
13	13 June 1926	Stade Yves-du-Manoir, Colombes, France	Yugoslavia	4–1	4–1	Friendly
14	21 February 1928	Stade Buffalo, Montrouge, France	Ireland	1–0	4–0	Friendly
15	21 February 1928	Stade Buffalo, Montrouge, France	Ireland	2–0	4–0	Friendly
16	21 February 1928	Stade Buffalo, Montrouge, France	Ireland	3–0	4–0	Friendly
17	11 March 1928	Stade olympique de la Pontaise, Lausanne, Switzerland	Switzerland	3–4	3–4	Friendly
18	29 April 1928	Parc des Princes, Paris, France	Portugal	1–1	1–1	Friendly
19	24 February 1929	Stade Yves-du-Manoir, Colombes, France	Hungary	2–0	3–0	Friendly
20	24 March 1929	Stade Yves-du-Manoir, Colombes, France	Portugal	1–0	2–0	Friendly

== Honours ==
Red Star Olympique

- Coupe de France: 1921, 1922, 1923 and 1928

France

- Inter-Allied Games (1919) runner-up
