= Ralph Parcaut =

American wrestler

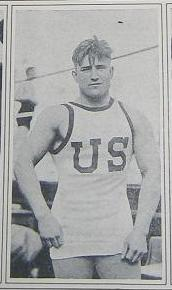
Ralph Parcaut at Pershing Stadium in Paris during the 1919 Inter-Allied Games

Ralph Edward Parcaut (December 3, 1896 – June 25, 1957) was an American professional wrestler in the early part of the 20th century. He served in the U.S. Marines in World War I and won gold medals at the American Expeditionary Forces (A.E.F.) Games in Germany following the War and at the Inter-Allied Games held near Paris in 1919. He also won the title of "Middleweight Champion of the World" in 1920 and held the title until at least 1923. He was injured in a plane crash while barnstorming around 1932, ending his pro wrestling career. He later became a promoter, trainer, author, and showman for early body building.

== Early life and training ==
Ralph Parcaut was born in Iowa on December 3, 1896. His parents, Edward and Eva Parcaut, were farmers who in 1894 had settled on a farm in Grant Township, an area near Sutherland, a small town in O'Brien County, Iowa. They had a family of seven children. From an early age, Parcaut took a keen interest in wrestling with other boys and began to demonstrate considerable aptitude for the sport. In 1906, at the age of 15, a local wrestling fan, impressed with Parcaut's talent and potential, gave him $100, a considerable sum at the time, to seek training from famed wrestler and instructor Martin "Farmer" Burns. At the time, Burns operated a school for wrestlers in Omaha, Nebraska, where he offered physical training and taught catch-as-catch-can or freestyle wrestling. Parcaut traveled to Omaha, his $100.00 buying him ten lessons, as Burns charged $10.00 an hour for one-on-one wrestling instruction with students. Burns instilled in young Parcaut what would become a lifelong regimen of training and most importantly "clean living." As Parcaut recalled years later, "I'll never forget the first time I met him in Omaha.... All the way back to the gymnasium he talked to me about the evils of drink and of smoking and even urged me not to partake of tea or coffee."

== Champion wrestler of the American Expeditionary Forces ==
In August 1918, at the age of 22, Parcaut enlisted in the United States Marine Corps. At the time, one could enlist for two years, four years, or for the duration of the war, and Parcaut chose the last option. He received basic training at Quantico, Virginia, and was assigned to Company "D," Seventh Separate Battalion. Upon completion of his training at the end of October 1918, he was shipped overseas to England aboard the transport USS Pocahontas, a former German luxury liner which had been seized by the U.S. Government and converted for war service. Upon arrival in France, Private Parcaut was assigned to the 74th Company, 6th Marine Regiment, 4th Brigade, 2nd Infantry Division, American Expeditionary Forces, likely as a KIA or WIA (killed in action or wounded in action) replacement. Six months earlier, in April 1918, the 74th Company had been encamped while being held in reserve near Verdun, site of the Battle of Verdun in 1916, and was shelled by a nighttime German artillery barrage firing deadly mustard gas shells. With many of the Marines caught asleep in their tents, the unit suffered casualties of over 300 officers and men, 40 of whom were killed. On November 11, 1918, very shortly after his arrival in France, the Armistice officially ended the hostilities of World War I, and, being too late for combat duty, Parcaut was assigned to the Occupation Forces then moving into Germany.

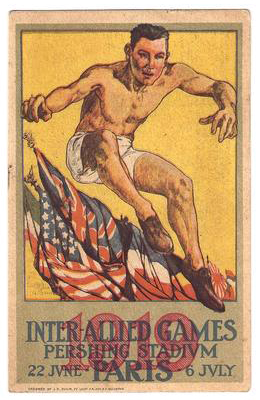
The poster for the Inter-Allied Games, depicting an athlete jumping over the flags of the Allied Nations.

On December 29, 1918, General John J. Pershing issued the first General Order (#241) relating to sports in the U.S. Army. General Pershing was the Commander of the American Expeditionary Forces. The order directed the development of general and competitive athletics and all kinds of appropriate entertainment for the purpose of keeping up the morale, fostering and developing organization, esprit de corps, and improving the physical fitness of the Army. The order led to American Expeditionary Forces championship competitions in track & field, baseball, football, basketball, tennis, boxing and wrestling. The publication of GO #241 established a cooperative arrangement between the Army and the YMCA. The Inter-Allied Games, as the culminating event was to be known, signaled the peace following the Great War to soldiers of the Allied armies.

The invitation to participate in the Inter-Allied Games was issued by General Pershing, as Commander-in-Chief (CINC) of the American Expeditionary Forces, on January 19, 1919, less than five and a half months before the opening of the events themselves. Invitations were sent to 29 nations; Germany, was excluded for obvious reasons. Eighteen nations accepted, while other countries declined for various reasons. Some had only a small number of men in France, for some the date for the games was too near to allow for training and transporting soldiers, and troops of other nations had already left France and were being demobilized at home.

Drawing on his skill and training gained from Farmer Burns twelve years earlier, Parcaut entered one of the preliminary matches, the American Expeditionary Forces Divisional Games held in Coblenz, Germany, and won first place in his event. In April 1919, he was detached from his company to compete in the American Expeditionary Forces Games, held at Le Mans, France, and once again took first prize in wrestling. He was held in service in France in order to compete in the Inter-Allied Games which officially took place in Paris at the newly constructed Pershing Stadium from June 22 to July 6, 1919. To add to the heightened mood of the Games, on June 28, 1919, the fifth anniversary of the assassination of Archduke Franz Ferdinand of Austria and his wife Sophie in Sarajevo, the event which had precipitated the war, the formal signing of the Treaty of Versailles took place, officially bringing World War I to a close. During the course of the Inter-allied Games, Parcaut soundly defeated challengers from fourteen nations in the light heavyweight division of catch-as-catch-can wrestling, taking every bout but the final one with falls, to become the "Champion Wrestler of the A.E.F." He was one of only twelve American servicemen to win gold medals at the games, including future boxing legend Gene Tunney.

General Pershing and many other notables, including France's Marshal Ferdinand Foch, who had been Supreme Commander of the Allied Armies, sat in on Parcaut's victorious matches during the games, and his gold medal was awarded at the closing ceremonies by Pershing himself. Following the end of the games, Pershing Stadium, which had been specially built by the U.S. Military and YMCA to host the event, was officially presented as a gift from the United States to the people of France. On his way back to the U.S. following the games, Parcaut won the title of Heavyweight Champion of the Navy. By August 1919, Parcaut was back in the States, assigned to the 203rd Casual Company, Marine Barracks, Quantico, Virginia, and shortly afterwards was honorably discharged. For his exemplary service, he was awarded the USMC Good Conduct Medal as well as the World War I Victory Medal.

== Professional career - Middleweight Champion of the World ==
Upon his return to civilian life, Parcaut began a very successful career as a professional wrestler. Although originally from Sutherland, Iowa, he later lived for a time in Spencer, Iowa, Royal, Iowa, and later Des Moines. He was usually billed for wrestling bouts as being from Spencer or Royal. From 1920 to 1921 he became the wrestling coach and an instructor at the University of Iowa. On Wednesday, August 25, 1920, only a year after returning from France, Parcaut grappled with the reigning Champ Johnny Meyers from Chicago, Illinois, for a chance at the Middleweight Champion of the World title. According to the playbill for the match, Meyers had been in "over 400 matches and stands alone in his class according to his followers." The bout was to be held before a standing-room-only crowd at the Grand Opera House in Spencer, Iowa, and for weeks leading up to the match the event was front-page news.

Parcaut-Meyers Match Aug 25th
Royal Man To Meet Middleweight Champion at Spencer
Parcaut, by his brilliant past performances has earned this attempt at the world title, and hopes are high in and around Spencer that he may bring the Championship to Clay County. . . From the Meyers camp in Chicago comes the following remark as to how the match is viewed there: "Speculation is rife here among wrestling fans over the outcome of the contest between Johnny Meyers, local star and Champion Middleweight of the World, and Ralph Parcaut, the latest Iowa sensation. Parcaut is an unknown so far as local followers are concerned, he having never appeared in a test before them, but news of his ability, strength, and endurance have been seeping into sport circles for quite some little time now that he is to have this fling at the title on Aug. 25th in a Spencer Ring, the event is awaited with much interest."

Parcaut soundly defeated Johnny Meyers that night to claim victory and the title of "Middleweight Champion of the World," which he would hold until at least 1923. Twelve days later, on September 8, 1920, Royal, Iowa, celebrated "Parcaut Day" in honor of his achievement. The festivities involved a full day of entertainment, sports, speeches, and ended with a free dance. From that point on Parcaut's career was on fire, and on July 6, 1920, he set a record for some of the shortest falls in wrestling history. Parcaut beat Young Dane (3/5), winning the first fall in eight seconds, the second in twelve seconds, and the third in fifteen seconds. The entire match lasted only 35 seconds. He continued to wrestle around Iowa and the Midwest and grappled with such competitors as Johnny Meyers, Pinkie Gardner, Joe Turner, Lou Talaber, Chris Jordan, Paul Prehn, and Billy Schober. The rivalry of Parcaut with Schober and Prehn, also from Iowa, was so keen they drew large crowds wherever they met. Parcaut, unlike some of the other "matmen" of his era, gloried in stiff competition. He would not "work" with an opponent. He preferred to "shoot" for a win rather than give an exhibition. He was so confident in his abilities that he would wrestle anyone, most anywhere, for fun if necessary. Consequently, he never made as much money as his contemporaries." From 1924–25, Parcaut (misspelled Paracut on school records) served as head wrestling coach at Simpson College in Indianola, Iowa, for one season. During this season his team competed in three matches, losing two against Iowa State and Northern Iowa, and winning one against Des Moines University 21 to 0.

== Barnstorming ==
Aside from wrestling, in the early 1920s Parcaut began performing daring "barnstorming" aerialist exhibitions where he would fearlessly walk on the wings of a biplane and execute handstands and other feats while in flight. He even executed a skillful transition from a moving airplane, via a long rope that dangled below, to the ground, and was purportedly the first to ever attempt the stunt. According to the recollections of an area local, Parcaut once jumped out of a plane over Spencer, Iowa, wearing a "batman" costume in the early 1930s. Sometime around 1932, while performing a barnstorming exhibition at Boone, Iowa, the biplane from which he was performing suddenly lost engine power and plummeted over 1,000 feet to the ground, crashing in a farmer's field. Parcaut survived the crash, likely due to his extremely good physical condition, but was severely injured. The aircraft itself was a complete wreck. Due to the nature of his injuries, "he lost much of his speed and was never prominent as a wrestler again."

== Post 1932 - physical culture ==
After recovering, Parcaut worked as a personal trainer and traveled around the country, giving demonstrations of "physical culture" (which we would today call bodybuilding) and lessons in clean living, much as his mentor, Farmer Burns, had done. Parcaut would often perform demonstrations of his strength and physique for amazed onlookers at fairs:

"He'd loop a rope around his throat, put two or three strong men at each end and let them pull. He was able to distend his throat muscles so that the pressure on them had no effect. It was impossible to choke him in that manner."

"From a wrestler's bridge, he'll let three 200 pound men stand on his body and will support them; from the same bridge he'll lift 150 pounds on his two hands; he'll show that he has a neck expansion of four and one-half inches; instead of using a derby hat on his chest, as Burns did, he'll hold a small boy, place a tape around the lad and himself and after the youngster has been extricated will fill the tape with muscle, bone, and of course air from his lungs. These are only a few of his stunts."

Around 1938, Parcaut also authored a book on physical culture to pass on his skills and tips to a new generation of enthusiasts, much as Farmer Burns had in 1914. It entailed how to use muscle tension exercises for gaining strength and definition as well as training regimen advice.

Parcaut died in Des Moines at the age of 61 on June 25, 1957. He was buried three days later in Glendale Cemetery, Des Moines Township, Iowa. His wife Ruth died in 1969 and was buried alongside him. To this day, he is remembered as one of the greatest middleweight "matmen" of his era.

== Championships and accomplishments ==
- AEF Divisional Games, Middleweight Champion
- AEF Championship Games, Light Heavyweight Champion
- Inter-Allied Games, Light Heavyweight Champion (Gold Medalist)
- Heavyweight Champion of the Navy (Boxing)
- World Middleweight Championship (1 time)
- Set a record for shortest falls in wrestling history; 8, 12, and 15 seconds in a three-round match
- Wrestling Coach/Instructor, University of Iowa, 1920–21
- Wrestling Coach/Instructor, Des Moines University
- Head Wrestling Coach, Simpson College, 1924–25
- Barnstorming - Purportedly the first to ever successfully transition from a moving airplane to the ground
- Authored an early book on "physical culture," c.1938
