= Antonio Janni =

Italian footballer and manager (1904-1987)

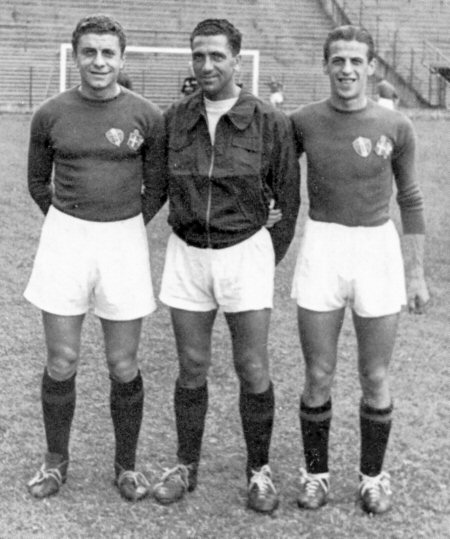
- Cesare Gallea (left) – Antonio Janni (center) – Franco Ossola (right)

Personal information
- Date of birth: 19 September 1904
- Place of birth: Santena, Italy
- Date of death: 29 June 1987 (aged 82)
- Place of death: Turin, Italy
- Position: Midfielder

Youth career
- 191?–1920: Torino

Senior career*
Years	Team	Apps	(Gls)
1920–1937	Torino	322	(48)
1937–1938	Varese	18	(0)

International career
1924–1929	Italy	23	(1)

Managerial career
- 1937–1938: Torino
- 1938–1940: Varese
- 1941–1942: Varese
- 1942–1943: Torino
- 1944: Torino FIAT
Medal record
Italy
Summer Olympics
Bronze medal – third place	1928 Amsterdam
Central European International Cup
Gold medal – first place	·1927–30 Central European International Cup
- * Club domestic league appearances and goals

Antonio Janni (Italian pronunciation: [anˈtɔːnjo ˈjanni]; 19 September 1904 – 29 June 1987) was an Italian football manager and player who played as a midfielder.

== Career ==
Throughout his career, Janni played for Italian sides Torino and Varese at club level. Janni was a member of the Italy national team which won the bronze medal at the 1928 Summer Olympic football tournament and the gold medal at the 1927–30 Central European International Cup.

== Honours ==
=== Player ===
Torino

- Divisione Nazionale: 1927–28
- Coppa Italia: 1935–36

Italy

- Central European International Cup: 1927–30
- Summer Olympics Bronze: 1928

=== Manager ===
Torino

- Serie A: 1942–43
- Coppa Italia: 1942–43

SPAL

- Serie B: 1950–51

Varese

- Serie C: 1938–39, 1941–42
