= Josef Stroh =

Austrian footballer (1913–1991)

Personal information
- Date of birth: 5 March 1913
- Place of birth: Vienna, Austria-Hungary
- Date of death: 7 January 1991 (aged 77)
- Place of death: Vienna, Austria
- Position: Striker

Senior career*
Years	Team	Apps	(Gls)
- Floridsdorfer SC
- Floridsdorfer AC
1932–1948	FK Austria Wien		

International career
1935–1948	Austria	17	(4)
1938–1939	Germany	4	(1)

Managerial career
- SC Wiener Neustadt
- FC Wien
- SC Schwechat
- 1951–1954: Jönköpings Södra IF
- 1955–1959: Malmö FF
- 1959–1960: IFK Göteborg
- 1960–1963: Wiener Sport-Club
- 1964: SK Brann
- 1965: Jönköpings Södra IF
- 1966: Sandvikens IF
- * Club domestic league appearances and goals

Josef "Pepi" Stroh (5 March 1913 – 7 January 1991) was an Austrian footballer and football manager. He played club football mainly with FK Austria Wien.

== International career ==
He was part of Austria’s team for the 1934 FIFA World Cup but he didn’t play any match. With Austria national football team, he was also part of the squad for the 1948 but he didn’t play Austria only match in the tournament, a 3-0 defeat against Sweden men's national football team.

He also played for the Germany national football team. and was part of the German squad for the 1938 FIFA World Cup He played one match, the lost replay against Switzerland, as Germany were knocked out in the first round.

== Coaching career ==
He coached SC Wiener Neustadt, FC Wien, SC Schwechat, Jönköpings Södra IF, Malmö FF, IFK Göteborg, SK Brann, Sandvikens IF and Sportklub.
