= Camillo Jerusalem =

Austrian footballer

Personal information
- Date of birth: 3 April 1914
- Place of birth: Vienna, Austria
- Date of death: 1 August 1989 (aged 75)
- Positions: Midfielder; striker

Senior career*
Years	Team	Apps	(Gls)
1930–1938	Austria Wien	74	(40)
1945–1946	Austria Wien	11	(7)
1946	Sochaux		
1946–1947	Roubaix-Tourcoing		
1947–1948	Colmar		
1949	Besançon		
1949–1951	Servette		

International career
1936–1945	Austria	12	(6)

Managerial career
- 1951–1953: Grenchen
- * Club domestic league appearances and goals

Camillo Jerusalem (3 April 1914 – 1 August 1979) was an Austrian footballer who played as a midfielder or forward. He played for Austria Wien, Sochaux, Roubaix-Tourcoing, Colmar, Besançon and Servette. He also coached Grenchen.

On 15 May 1938, Aston Villa's match against a German Select XI was played in marked contrast to the England game the day before with continual jeering and whistling. When Alex Massie fouled Jerusalem, the referee needed to separate the teams. Hostility from the 110,000 crowd intensified when the Villa players left the pitch without the required Nazi salute and Joseph Goebbels was called to suppress subsequent hostile German press coverage.
