= Giuseppe Asti =

Italian footballer

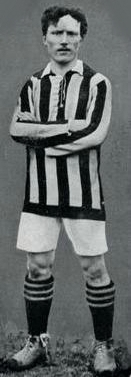

Personal information
- Date of birth: 31 July 1891
- Place of birth: Milan, Italy
- Date of death: 1970 (aged 78–79)
- Position: Forward

Senior career*
Years	Team	Apps	(Gls)
1909–1912	Milanese	35	(?)
1912–1914	Minerva		
1914–1920	Internazionale		
1920–1922	Novese	36	(2)
1922–1923	Internazionale	8	(1)

International career
1920	Italy	1	(0)
- * Club domestic league appearances and goals

Giuseppe Asti (Italian pronunciation: [dʒuˈzɛppe ˈasti]; 31 July 1891 – 1970) was an Italian footballer who played as a forward. He played for F.C. Internazionale Milano for 6 seasons, winning the Italian league championship in the 1919–20 season. He made his only international appearance for the Italy national football team on 28 March 1920 in a game against Switzerland.
