= Albert Rénier =

French footballer (1896–1948)

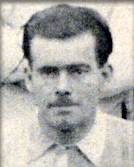
- Albert Rénier

Personal information
- Date of birth: 8 May 1896
- Place of birth: Le Havre, France
- Date of death: 5 April 1948 (aged 51)
- Place of death: Le Havre, France

Senior career*
Years	Team	Apps	(Gls)
1919–1925	Le Havre		

International career
1919	France military	4	(5)
1920–1924	France	4	(1)
- * Club domestic league appearances and goals

Albert Rénier (8 May 1896 – 5 April 1948) was a French footballer who played all of his career for Le Havre. He played in four matches for the France national football team between 1920 and 1924, netting once.

== Club career ==
He played his entire career with Le Havre Athletic Club, thus being part of the so-called one-club men group. With his club, he reached the 1920 Coupe de France Final after beating AS Cannes after extra-time in the semi-finals. Albert Rénier could not play in the final and without him, the club lost to Cercle Athlétique de Paris (1–2).

== International career ==
He earned four caps for the France national team between 1920 and 1924, and scored a goal in France's 2–0 victory over Belgium on 13 January 1924 at the Stade Buffalo, netting with a diving header by taking over a cross from Gérard Isbecque. In 1924, he was a member of the French squad for the football tournament at the 1924 Summer Olympics, but he did not play in any matches.

In 1919, he took part in the Inter-Allied Games in Paris, a large sports competition organized in celebration of the Allied victory in World War I. However, the matches of the tournament are not included in the official FIFA register. Rénier helped France win Group A with one goal against Romania (4–0) and a hat-trick against Greece (11–0). Rénier also scored in the final to give his side a 2–0 lead over Czechoslovakia, but his team ended up losing 3–2.

== Honours ==
=== Club ===
Le Havre

- Coupe de France:
  - Runner-up (1): 1920

=== International ===
France

  - Runner-up (1): 1919 Inter-Allied Games
