= Aristodemo Santamaria =

Italian footballer (1892–1974)

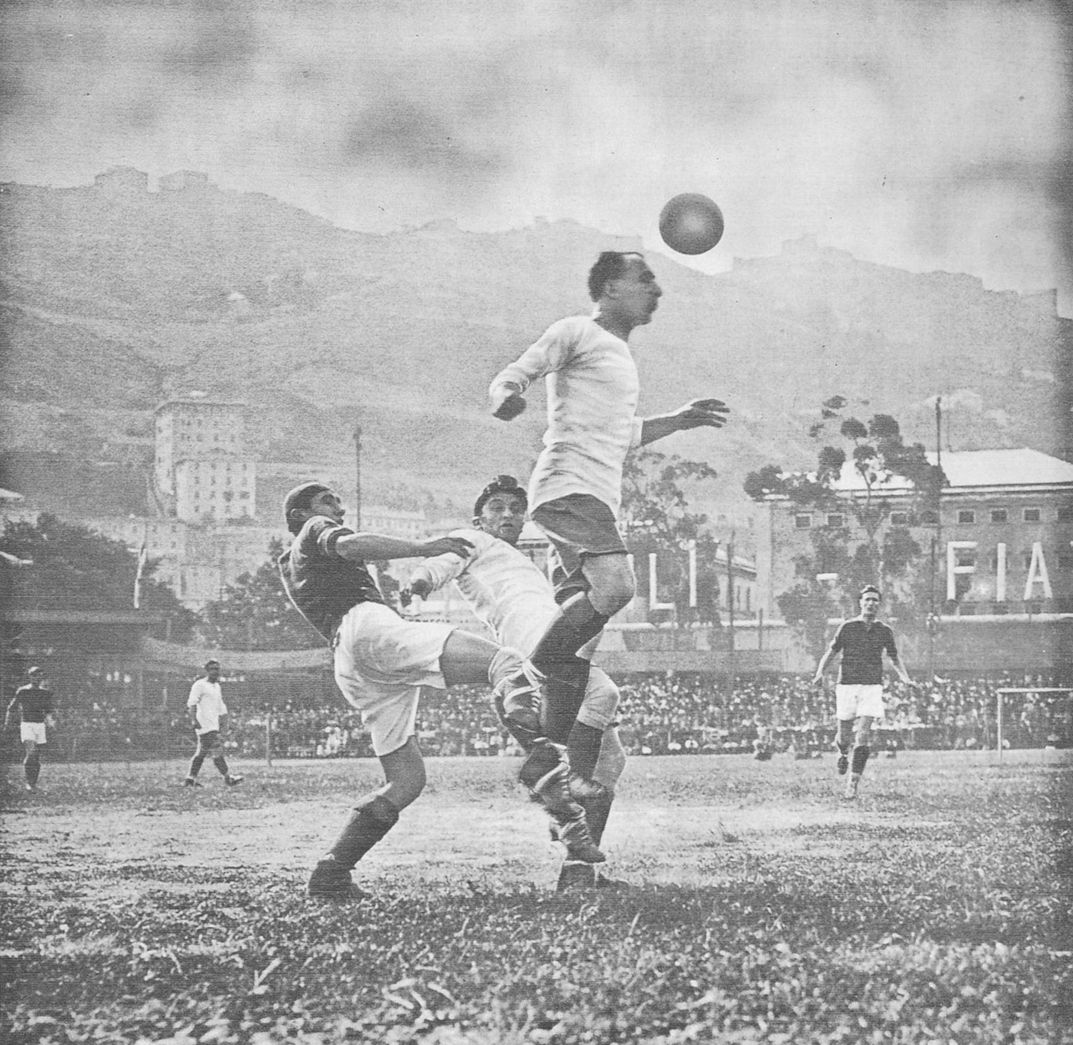

Personal information
- Date of birth: 9 February 1892
- Place of birth: Genoa, Italy
- Date of death: 10 December 1974 (aged 82)
- Place of death: Genoa, Italy
- Position: Forward

Senior career*
Years	Team	Apps	(Gls)
1908–1913	Andrea Doria	62	(21)
1913–1920	Genoa	39	(37)
1920–1922	Novese	2	(0)
1922–1926	Genoa	70	(38)

International career
1915–1923	Italy	11	(3)
- * Club domestic league appearances and goals

Aristodemo Santamaria (Italian pronunciation: [aristoˈdɛːmo santamaˈriːa]; 9 February 1892 – 10 December 1974) was an Italian footballer who played as a forward. With the Italy national football team, he competed in the men's tournament at the 1920 Summer Olympics.
