= Inter-Allied Games =

1919 sporting event in Paris, France

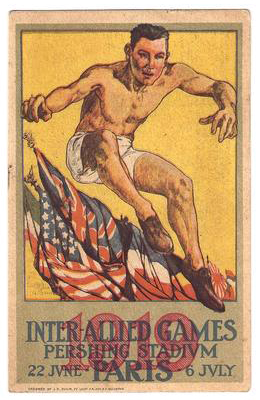
- The poster for the Inter-Allied Games, depicting an athlete jumping over the flags of the Allied Nations. The illustration was designed by First Lieutenant J.H. Dulin.
- Host city: Paris
- Country: France
- Opening: 22 June 1919
- Closing: 6 July 1919

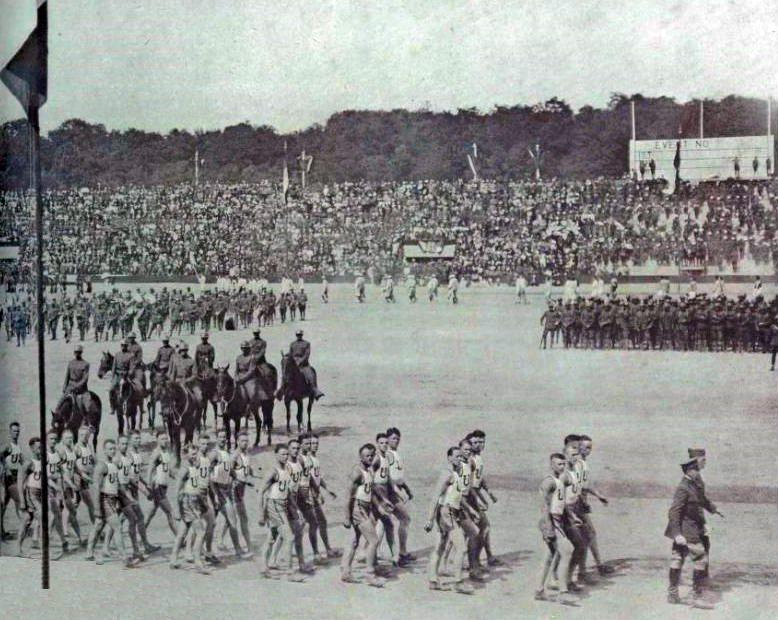
The American team at the opening ceremony of the 1919 Inter-Allied Games

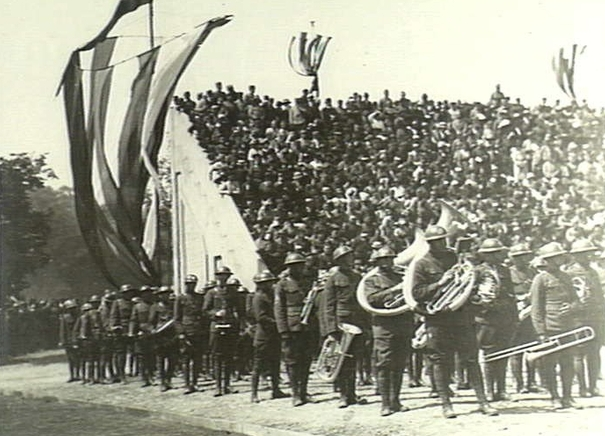
American Army Band marching in the opening ceremonies of the Inter-Allied Games - Pershing stadium, Paris, France, 22 June 1919

The Inter-Allied Games was a one-off multi-sport event held from 22 June to 6 July 1919 at the newly constructed Pershing Stadium just outside Paris, France following the end of World War I. The host stadium had been built near the Bois de Vincennes by the U.S. Military in cooperation with the YMCA. The event was only open to participation by military personnel who were currently serving or had formerly served in the armed forces during the War. Around 1500 athletes from a total of eighteen nations participated in the proceedings which featured nineteen sports. Following the conclusion of the games, Pershing Stadium was presented as a gift to the people of France from the United States of America. The area, still known as Le Stade Pershing, continues to be used as an open air recreation park to this day.

== Sports ==
A total of nineteen sports were contested at the games. A number of military-oriented events was initially planned, but only hand-grenade throwing and shooting made it on to the final programme.

- American football
- Association football
- Athletics
- Baseball
- Basketball
- Boxing
- Cross country running
- Equestrian
- Fencing
- Golf
- Hand-grenade throwing
- Rowing
- Rugby union
- Shooting
- Swimming
- Tennis
- Tug of war
- Water polo
- Wrestling

== Participating nations ==
A total of twenty-eight nations from the Allies of World War I were invited to the competition and eighteen nations accepted the invitation. China aimed to compete, but ultimately was unable to send any athletes to the games within the timescale. It did, however, provide medals and trophies in support of the games. The Kingdom of Hejaz sent a delegation but with no athletes, choosing to demonstrate the skills of their Arabian horsemen instead. A full list of participants was made by the organisers.

- Australia
- Belgium
- Brazil
- Canada
- Czechoslovakia
- France
- Great Britain
- Greece
- Guatemala (1)
- Hejaz
- Italy
- Newfoundland (1)
- New Zealand
- Poland (1)
- Portugal
- Romania
- Serbia
- United States

== Gold medalists ==
These athletes competed in and won gold medals at the 1919 Inter-Allied Games:

- Ralph Parcaut – Gold Medal, Light Heavyweight Division, Catch as Catch Can Wrestling
- Paul Prehn – Gold Medal, Middleweight Division, Catch as Catch Can Wrestling
- Gene Tunney – Gold Medal, Boxing
- Max Friedman – Gold medal, Basketball
- Norman Ross – 5 Gold Medals, Swimming
- Carl F. Haas, William Clinton Gray, Floyd F. Campbell, and Lawrence M. Shields – Medley Relay Race
- United States of America, First Place, Rifle Shooting Team, Team Members include – Brigadier General Paul A. Wolf
- Darcy Hadfield – Gold Medal, Single Sculls, Rowing
- Adam DeBus – Gold Medal, Baseball
- Williamn Marriott – Gold Medal, Baseball
- André Gobert (France) – Gold Medal, Men's Singles, Tennis
- Charley Paddock - Gold Medal, track, 100m, 200m
