= Lucien Gamblin =

French footballer (1890-1972)

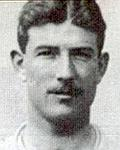

Personal information
- Full name: Lucien Gamblin
- Date of birth: 22 July 1890
- Place of birth: Ivry-sur-Seine, France
- Date of death: 30 August 1972 (aged 82)
- Position: Midfielder

Youth career
- 1904–1907: US Saint-Mandé
- 1907–1911: Red Star FC

Senior career*
Years	Team	Apps	(Gls)
1911–1923	Red Star FC		

International career
1911–1923	France	17	(0)
- * Club domestic league appearances and goals

Lucien "Lulu" Gamblin (22 July 1890 – 30 August 1972) was a French international footballer played as a midfielder. He spent his entire career playing for Red Star FC and captained the team to three straight Coupe de France titles from 1921 to 1923. Gamblin was also a France international and made his debut with the team on 23 April 1911 in a 5–2 defeat to Switzerland. His international career was put on hold due to World War I. Following the war's conclusion, Gamblin captained the team in his final nine appearances. After retiring from football in 1923, he became a sports journalist working for such newspapers as L'Auto and France Football.
