= Stade Pershing =

Stadium in Paris, France (1919–1960)

Coordinates: 48°49′49″N 2°27′23″E

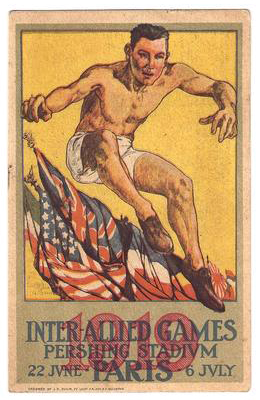
Inter-Allied Games 1919

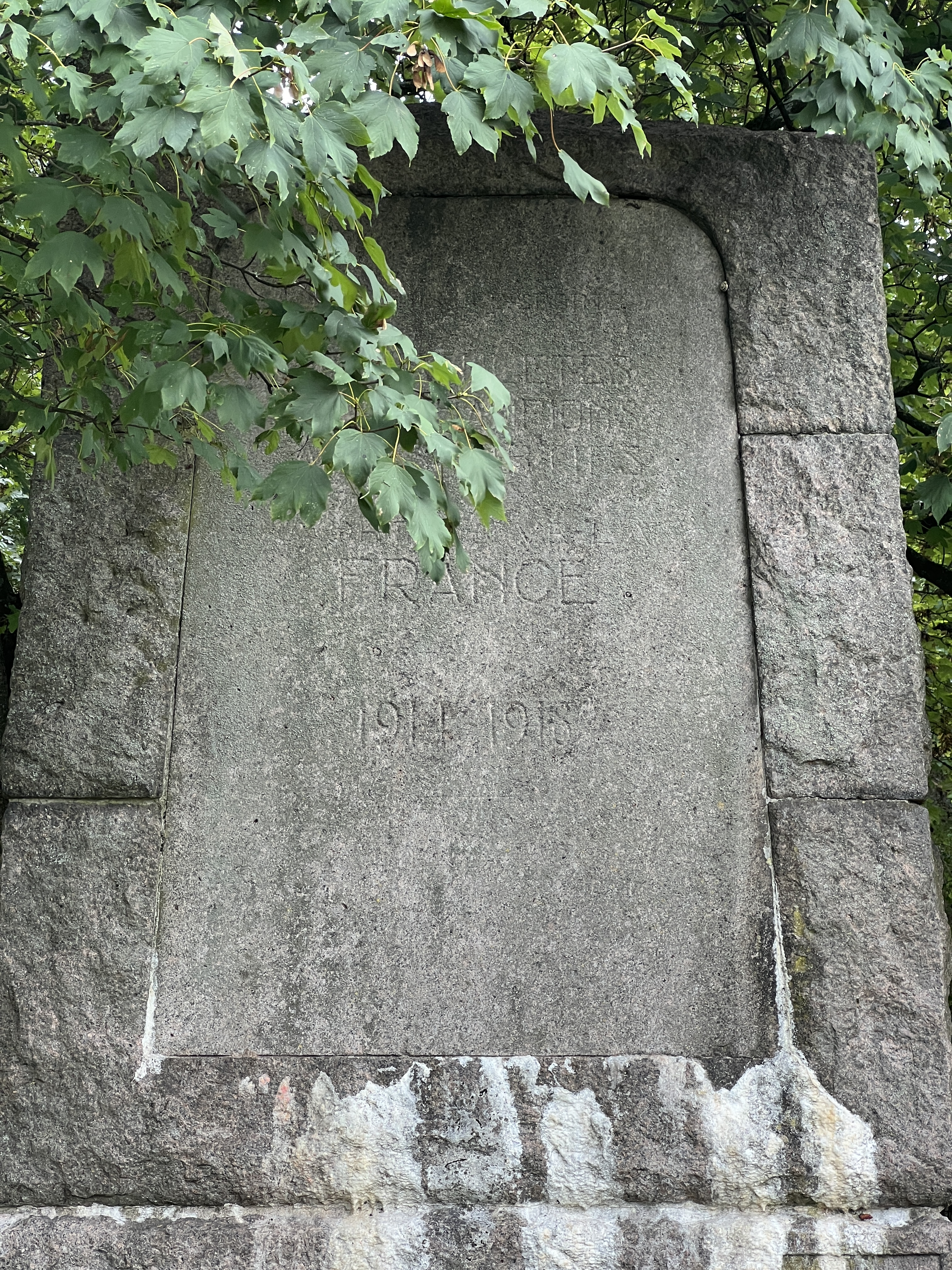
Monument to Dead Athletes in Stade Pershing

Stade Pershing [stad pɛʁʃiŋ] was a multi-purpose stadium in the Bois de Vincennes in Paris, France. It was used mostly for football matches and hosted the final of the Coupe de France on four occasions. It hosted the Inter-Allied Games in 1919 and the first Women's World Games in 1922. It also hosted some of the football matches during the 1924 Summer Olympics. The stadium was able to hold 29,000 spectators at its height; it opened in 1919 and closed in 1960.

Construction of the stadium was originally contracted to a French firm. However, labour disputes stopped all work. At this time, the engineers of the United States Army intervened and completed construction. It hosted the Inter-Allied Games, and then was presented as a gift from the US to France after the games concluded. At the June 22, 1919, inauguration ceremony, YMCA Chief Secretary Edward Clark Carter delivered the stadium to General Pershing, who in turn, immediately presented the deed to French Minister of Marine Georges Leygues.

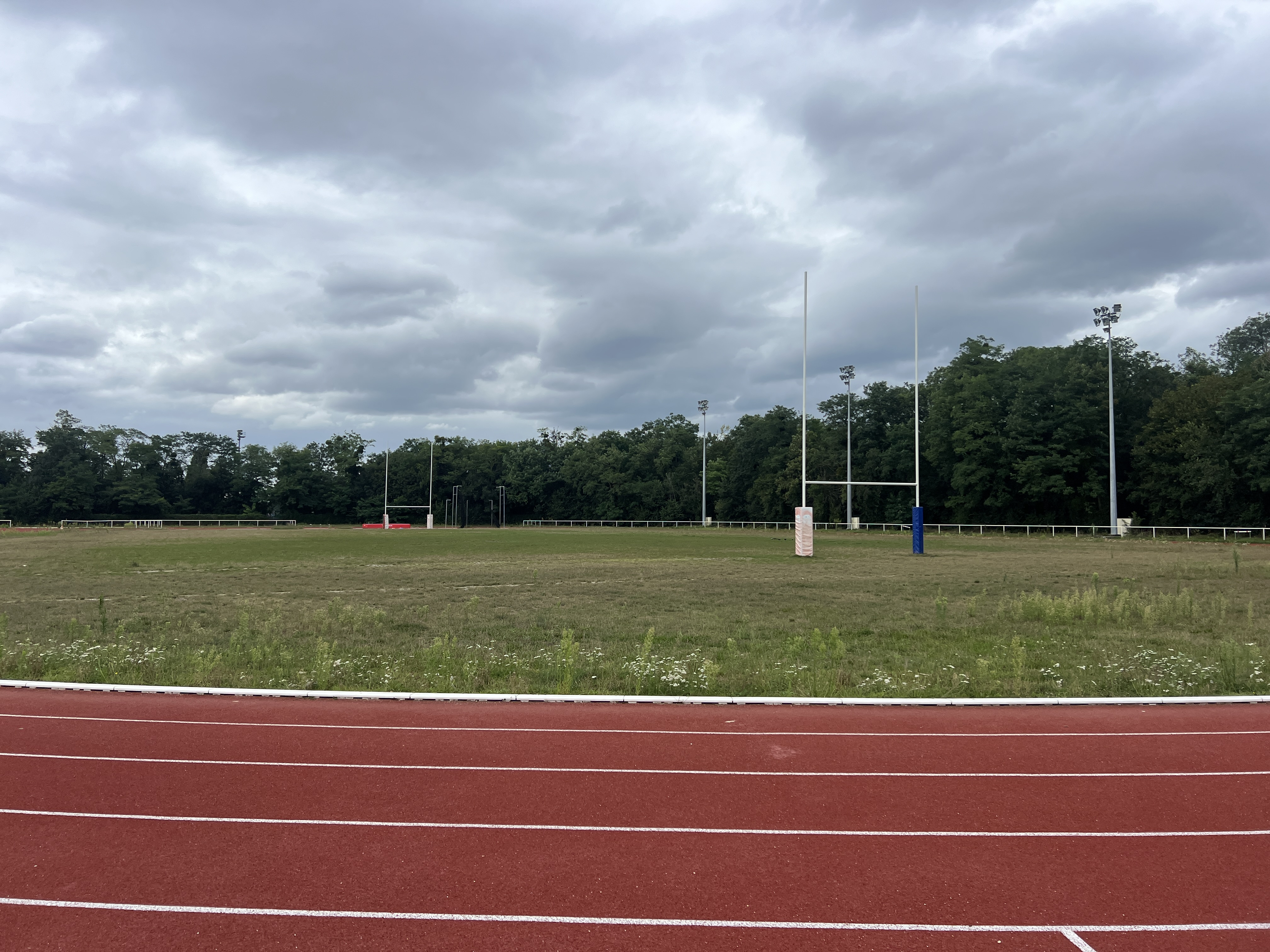
Stade Pershing today, with running track and rugby field

In 1923 and 1924, Stade Pershing saw the first football games between France and England, both of which were won by England.

An exhibition match at Stade Pershing between the England and Australian national rugby league football teams in December 1933 (won 63–13 by the Australians) as part of the Australian teams 1933–34 Kangaroo Tour, inspired the beginnings of rugby league in France.
