= Baseball in France =

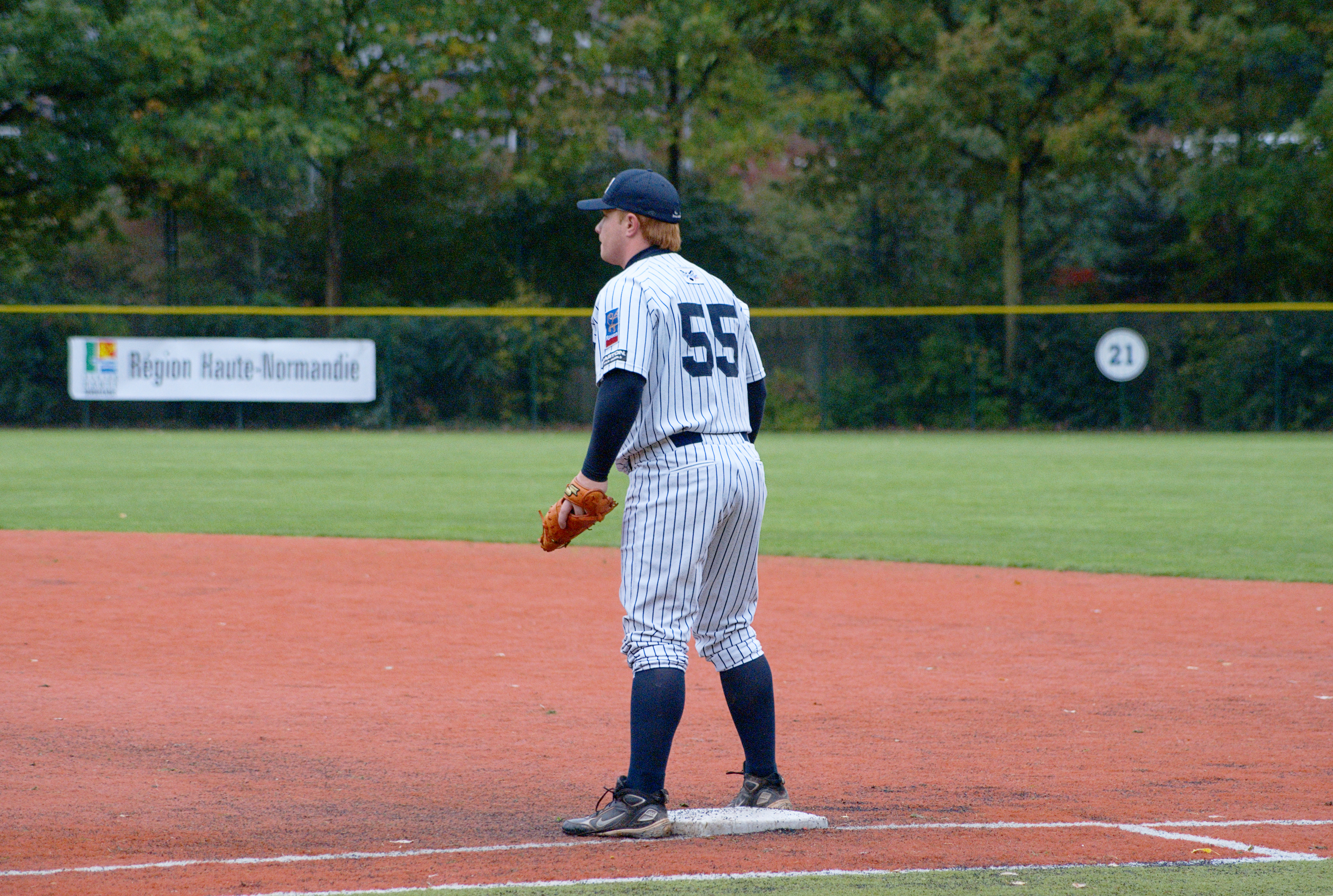
- Image of French baseball player David Gauthier
- Country: France
- Governing body: French Federation of Baseball and Softball
- National teams: Men's national team; Women's national team
- First played: 1889

National competitions
- French Division 1 Baseball Championship

International competitions
- European Baseball Championship; World Baseball Classic

Baseball is a growing minor sport in France. It is managed in the country by the French Federation of Baseball and Softball, founded in October 1924. The first baseball game played on French soil dates to March 8, 1889, as part of the Spalding World Tour, while the first championship took place before the First World War. Despite its roots in the late 19th century, baseball is still perceived in France as an exotic sport in the American image; as a result, French media gives it little attention.

Nevertheless, baseball is recognized as a high-level sport by the French Ministry of Sports, and takes full advantage of the characteristic structures of French sports, particularly DTN (directeurs techniques nationaux) and pôles (academies) for young athletes. This training-oriented policy has borne fruit with encouraging results, such as an 11th-place finish by the French team at the 2010 World Junior Baseball Championship that included the first international French victory. Four Frenchmen signed with Major League Baseball (MLB) organizations between 2007 and 2012: Joris Bert, Frédéric Hanvi, Andy Paz and Alexandre Roy

The French national baseball team is a consistent third behind the two strong European national clubs, Italy and the Netherlands. The situation is similar in intra-European club competition, but the Rouen Huskies showed that it was possible to shake up the European hierarchy by reaching the finals of the 2007 European Cup and the semifinals in 2012.

== History ==
=== From the origins to 1914: dreams full of head ===
The Spalding World Tour which passed through England and Ireland in 1874 was also to stop in Paris, but the match scheduled was canceled. The first baseball game played in France finally took place on March 8, 1889, as part of the Spalding World Tour, at the Parc Aérostatique de Paris, in front of 1,500 spectators. The game was between a selection of players from the National League and the Chicago White Stockings. Albert Spalding prioritized this game because he felt that the Paris market held significant promise for baseball.

The Los Angeles Times devoted a column in its May 17, 1908 issue to the development of baseball in France. Americans in Paris, but also French players, practiced baseball since the last decade of the 19th century; in the wake of the March 8, 1889 match, the main Parisian school clubs also set up thèque sections. Thèque is a traditional French bat-and-ball game dating back several hundred years, with many similarities to American baseball and the British rounders. According to ongoing research by Patrick Tugault, the Athletic Association of Lycée Janson-de-Sailly was the pioneer (1890), before the École alsacienne, Lycée Saint-Louis and Lycée Hoche (1891). The Stade français (1893) then the Racing Club de France (1897) followed the movement, as well as the Anglo-Saxon Parisian establishments : Anglo American AC (1897) and Anglo-Saxon School AC (1898).

The industrialist Émile Dubonnet became a baseball fan in 1911. Enthusiastic about the future of the sport in France, he helped in 1913 to finance the first national championship. The Parisian hen is based on the championship of the Paris Baseball Association, chaired by the American Frank B. Ellis, while a provincial group is formed. In Paris, the main clubs were Ranelagh BBC (Bagatelle), Spalding AC (Vésinet), Paris Team (American students from Paris), A.A. (Lycée Condorcet) and the Racing Club de France. In other provinces, there was also Rugby Nantes, Olympique Seynois, Évreux AC, US Berry and AS Macon.

In 1914, the year opens with the passage to Nice then to Paris of the world tour of the Chicago White Sox and the New York Giants. After several days of rain, the Paris match was held despite bad weather conditions, with Chicago winning 10–9 in Nice on February 13.

France acquired many fields, and baseball began to attract crowds; as a result there were up to 3,000 spectators at a single championship match at Le Vésinet. Spalding, who supported the young French league, was delighted by this development and declared that "The next baseball country will be France." The outbreak of World War I drastically ended these hopes.

=== 1914-1945: from one war to another ===
During the First World War, Canadian soldiers were the first to practice baseball in their free time on the French front. The Canadians also initiated many British and French soldiers, who were described as "enthusiastic practitioners" by the The New York Times in 1915. When the Americans arrived in 1918, they multiplied the meetings; on July 4, 1918, nearly 20,000 spectators attended a match in Rouen between American soldiers; many MLB players were present as members of the U.S. military.

At the end of the war, baseball entered universities, notably in Paris, Toulouse, Lyon, Nice and Dijon, while bats began to be produced locally. Christy Mathewson, stationed in France, was reserved when French players declared in 1919 to "The Washington Post" that they were more afraid of a baseball than a German grenade. John McGraw, on the other hand, is more optimistic.

In 1920, the Standard AC won the Paris championship organized by the Parisian baseball league. The following year, the National Baseball League was founded. Chaired by Gaston François, it brought together the League of Paris and that of the North. Its objectives are to popularize baseball in France, provide Paris with facilities to practice the sport, and obtain recognition from the Olympic Committee.

During the 1924 Summer Olympics in Paris, an exhibition baseball game was held on July 18 between teams named All Stars USA and the Ranelagh BBC. The Americans win 5–0. On August 31, a match pompously baptized the "European World Series" was held at the Stade Elisabeth Stadium in Paris between selections of players from Paris and London. The Paris All Stars won 15 to 8 over the London Americans, after having won in London in the first leg a few days earlier.

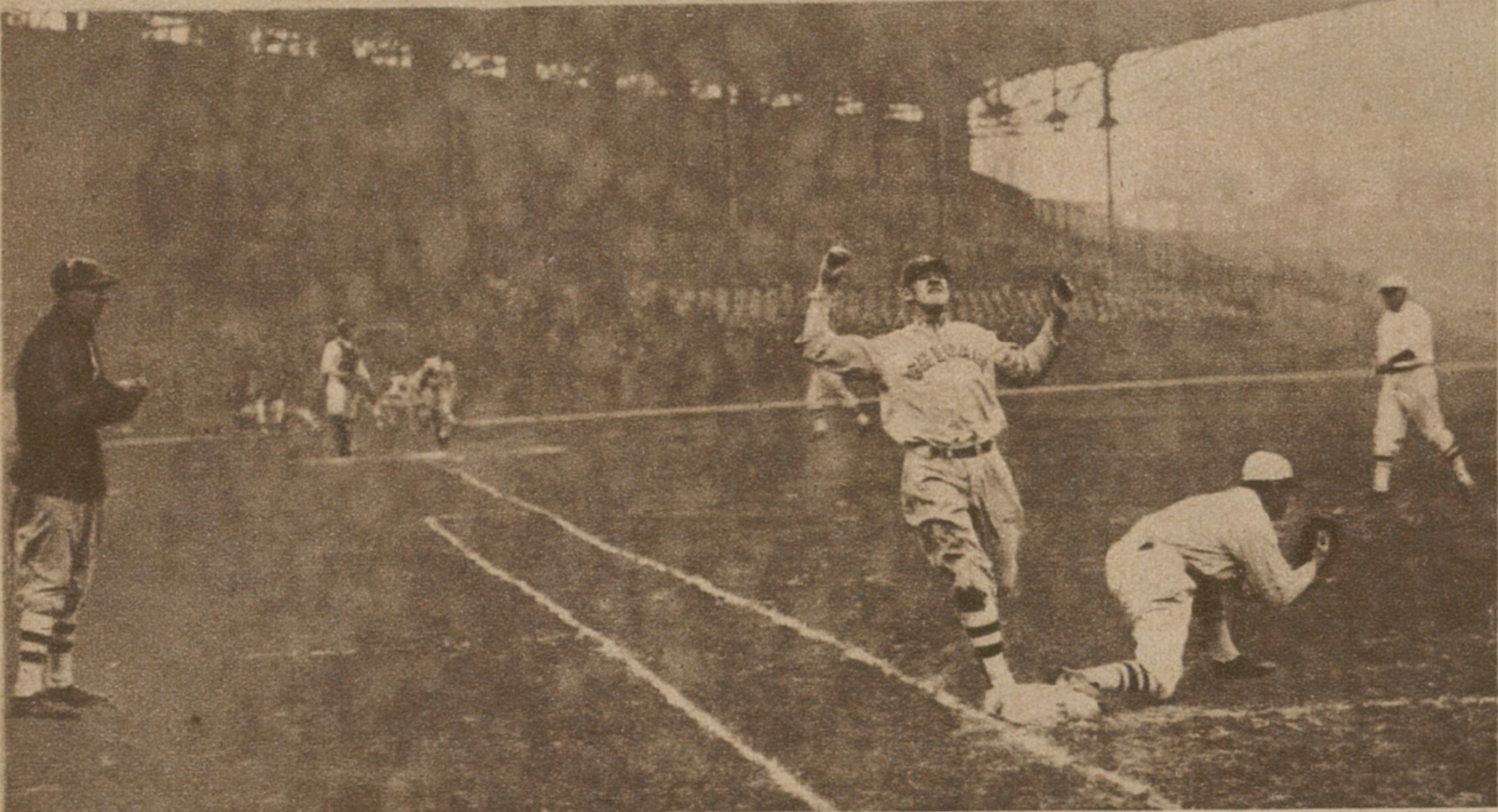
The Chicago White Sox and New York Giants play a match at Colombes, 1924

In November 1924, two MLB teams met in a friendly exhibition match in Paris: the pennant-winning New York Giants and the Chicago White Sox played at Stade de Colombes in front of 4,000 spectators. One commentator doubted that the sport would gain popularity in France, writing that the French preferred games that were more instinctive to them and pronouncing that "football and rugby are not in danger of being dethroned."

In the wake of this meeting, the French Federation of baseball and thèque was created. Frantz Reichel was the first president, while John McGraw and Charles Comiskey were named honorary vice-presidents. Reichel's motivations remain mysterious. Officially, he "organizes" baseball in France; unofficially, he muzzles him. Two facts illustrate this situation. Reichel refuses to recognize the American primacy over the discipline, especially putting forward the sport of thèque, and also refusing to receive any more MLB international tours. Two MLB teams made a trip to Europe in 1926, but attendance was poor in both Paris and London, with a greater reception occurring in Ireland. Reichel was one of the leading figures in the fight against professionalism, fearing that French baseball would experience this development. 1924 indeed marked a turning point in Europe at this level with the adoption of professionalism by Austrian football, a first on continental Europe for a team sport.

The federation set up a French championship in 1926, incorporating a few clubs from the Parisian baseball league such as Sporting Bedford Eco, Paris Champion in 1923. AS Transport won the first national title on August 22, 1926, a 15–10 victory in the final at Colombes against Ranelagh BBC. Initiated to play during the war, the French Army continued to practice during the 1920s and even considered adopting it as an official sport for training soldiers. This idea was abandoned in the 1930s. In 1929, the French national baseball team made their debut against their Spanish counterpart. The French won 10–6 at Barcelona. In the 1930s, competitions between France and the Netherlands became popular. The Dutch won the first game in Paris, 9–5, then won again in Amsterdam. The French earned their first victory in the third match, in Paris, 5–4. A three-way tournament with Belgium took place at the end of the 1930s.

=== 1945-1980: relaunch failure ===
The Second World War marked a severe halt to baseball in France, but this was not the case in the Netherlands. At the liberation, French baseball was in ruins. American soldiers reintroduced the sport and multiplied the meetings, even in medium-sized towns such as Auxerre and Compiègne. The 33rd Division Blackcats are the most famous training of the summer 1945. They had a few MLB players, including Dave Koslo, pitcher for the New York Giants, and Merv Connors, first base for the Chicago White Sox, and recorded thirty wins and four losses.

The president of the French baseball Federation since 1931, Georges Bruni, was very close to Reichel's theses, but was a genuine fan of the game. His action remained limited until 1945, when he was replaced by Thierry Blanchard (1945-1955). It was under the latter's authority that the Confederation of European Baseball was created in Paris on April 27, 1953, and France even managed to impose the exclusive use of a French vocabulary on the whole of European baseball. This did not last long. with the posts of president, vice-president and secretary passing to Italians, Spaniards and Belgians.

Between 1944 and the 1950s, a solid nucleus was developed in Tunisia, then still under French authority. Americans were at the origin of this movement, influencing the Tunisian League that had been active since 1920, mainly through the work of Marcel Cohen. The first matches between the French team and a selection of Tunisians was favorable to the African players (11–5 in 1949). The French team of 1955 which participates in the European championship included many of these Tunisian players. Despite this reinforcement, France suffered four defeats for no success in this competition. These mediocre results remained the norm until the 1980s; between 1955 and 1983, the French team only had two victories and 39 defeats in the European championship.

=== Since 1980 ===
Only 21 baseball clubs were active in France in 1976, but grew to over 170 clubs by the 1980s. In 1989, France hosted the 21st European Baseball Championship. For the occasion, a baseball field meeting international standards was built in the Bois de Vincennes, near Paris. According to a census by the Confederation of European Baseball in 2006, France had 153 baseball fields, including 13 meeting international standards. 30 of the fields were entirely dedicated to baseball. France had the opportunity to field a team for the 2009 Baseball World Cup, but declined to participate because of the lack of a proper stadium and committed partners, the International Baseball Federation first and foremost.

The amateur character of French baseball is now a thing of the past, with foreign players and coaches now having the opportunity to earn a few thousand euros per month in French clubs; Canadian Steve Scagnetti received a monthly salary equivalent to 2,500 Canadian dollars during his time with the Lions of Savigny-sur-Orge. The best player playing in France during the 1990s was the Canadian Jeff Zimmerman, who took advantage of the low level of opposition to develop his skills, being critical of the level of play in the French championship; he assessed it at the same level as junior college teams in the United States. Zimmerman went on to play in MLB from 1999 to 2001, and was selected as an All-Star in 1999.

The departure of Joris Bert, a young center fielder of the Rouen Huskies, to the Los Angeles Dodgers organization in 2007 confirmed the effectiveness of the training policy put in place with the support of the Ministry of Sports and MLB. MLB also organized training camps in France to observe the evolution of young French players and direct the best to the United States. A few months after Joris Bert, the young Frédéric Hanvi was recruited by the Minnesota Twins organization. In January 2011, the Franco-Cuban Andy Paz-Garriga signed with the Oakland Athletics.

On June 16, 2007, the Rouen Huskies took part in the finals of the European Cup. This great first for a French club ended in a 3–1 defeat for the Huskies against the Dutch Kinheim. Two years later, Rouen managed to win in a group match against the Netherlands champion Amsterdam Pirates 8–5 in 6 innings, the match being curtailed by rain; this was the first French victory in the European Cup against a Dutch club.

In 2012, the Rouen Huskies once again qualified for the European Cup semifinals. but lost against the Italian club Fortitudo Baseball Bologna. That same year, Alexandre Roy became the fourth Frenchman to sign a professional contract with an MLB franchise, the Seattle Mariners.

Also in 2012, France won the European Under-21 Championship, the first European title for the FrencH Baseball Federation since its creation. For the first time, the French national baseball team participated in a qualifying round for the World Baseball Classic in 2013, falling 8-0 to Spain and 5-2 to South Africa.

== Governing board ==
The sport is governed by the French Federation of Baseball and Softball.

== Domestic league ==
The French Division 1 Baseball Championship is the highest level of professional baseball in the country.
