= Belfast Northstars =

- Logo

Information
- League: Baseball Ireland
- Location: Belfast
- Ballpark: "Hydebank"
- Founded: 1996
- Nickname: "Stars
- Former ballpark(s): "The Dub", Queen's, "The Hank" Henry Jones Park
- Colors: Maroon and gold
- Manager: Darwin Sanchez

Current uniforms
| Home | Road |

The Belfast Northstars is one of two clubs from Northern Ireland competing in the Baseball Ireland adult league. The Northstars play their home games at Hydebank Playing Fields in Newtownbreda, Belfast. The club competes in Baseball Ireland's Div 1 League.

== Franchise history ==
=== Early years ===
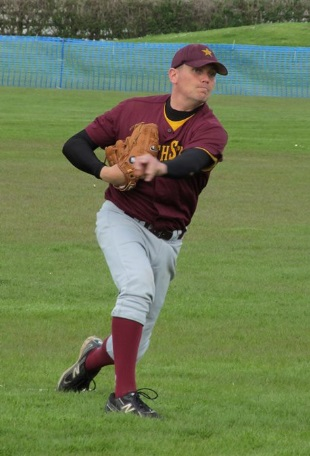
Northstars coach Jon Carter in 2013

The Northstars were formed in September 1996, when 10 players were split away from the Belfast Blue Sox. The Blue Sox had been affiliated with baseball in Britain, but travelling to games and hosting away teams became problematic.

Following the Blue Sox' demise, Gerry Long of Los Angeles was installed as the Northstars' first coach, and the new team established an affiliation with Baseball Ireland.

=== 2004: Winning season and playoff contenders ===
During the first few years of existence, the team were often performing poorly in the standings. The 2004 season saw the Northstars in contention to the last day of the season. The club beat one of the league's new teams, the Dublin Trojans, as well as the established Dublin Black Sox. Following the two narrow defeats against the reigning champion Dublin Hurricanes, the Northstars came close to making the playoffs but lost the final game of the season to the Black Sox, with that team finishing with a 12–6 record to the Northstars' 11–7 and edging out the Black Sox for one of the four playoff spots.

=== 2005: League Trophy final ===
A shake-up in Baseball Ireland's league structure for the 2005 season saw the creation of two separate competitions. Teams in the now nine-team league played each other just once before the league split into two. The top five teams competed for the League Championship while the remaining four battled for the newly created League Trophy. Teams played each other twice in the second half. By winning three of their first four games in the second half, the Northstars faced the now defunct Dublin Panthers, who had won their first four games, in two games that would decide the trophy winners. The Panthers, however, swept the short series at the O'Malley Fields at Corkagh Park in Clondalkin, West Dublin.

=== 2010: Winning season and playoffs ===
The addition of new young players alongside many established veterans helped the club to its first winning season in five years. During this period there were two victories over the reigning national champions the Spartans in Belfast, and also wins against the Black Sox, Hurricanes and league newcomers the Munster Warriors. By finishing the regular season with a record of 8 wins and 7 defeats, the Northstars placed fourth in the table, setting up a playoff semi-final with the Spartans.

=== 2013–2014 ===
The Northstars entered a growth phase in 2013, bringing in former Keuka College Storm pitcher Jonathan Sculli as co-manager, finishing eighth place at the Finkstonball tournament in Attnang-Puchheim, Austria and reintroducing the development team to Baseball Ireland's B League. By the first weekend in August, both A and B teams had qualified for the playoffs. The 2013 season was followed by another trip to the playoffs in the 2014 season, a berth clinched following a home two-game sweep over the defending champion Spartans.

== Players ==
=== Retired numbers ===
At the end of the 2004 season, the Northstars retired the number 12, which had been worn for eight seasons by their first full international player, Terry Rosbotham.

Rosbotham, the Northstars starting shortstop and one-time outfielder with the Ireland National team, had his career cut short due to a serious knee injury. Prior to taking up baseball, Rosbotham played American football in Belfast. As a fielder and clutch hitter, he was selected in 2001 to represent Ireland at Fenway Park in Boston against the Slocum baseball club from Rhode Island. His number was retired during a post-season awards ceremony in Belfast in 2004.

=== International players ===
To date, Terry Rosbotham remains the only Northstar to have played in a full international for Ireland, playing outfield in 2001 at Fenway Park.

Two years later, both he and teammate John Want were named as members of the Irish Development Baseball Team.

In 2006, two young Northstar outfielders – David McCullagh and Conor Keenan – were both selected to represent Ireland ahead of the European B Pool Championships in Belgium, but neither made an appearance.

In 2010, Colin Powers was selected to travel to Rhode Island with the National Team as a Development Player.

There has been Northstars' representation on both the President's 9 and Los Barbaros, select international teams made up of non-Irish nationals playing in the Baseball Ireland adult league. Pitchers Gordon Cuthbert and Conor Dawson are among those to have appeared for the President's 9.

=== Team MVPs ===
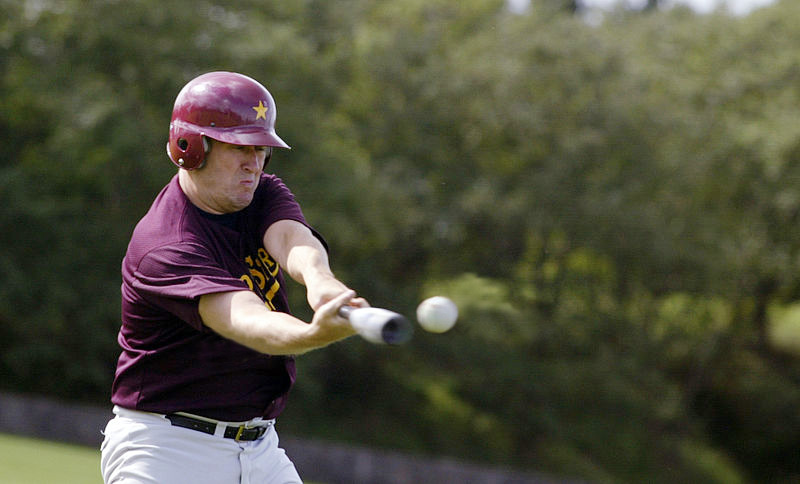
2006 MVP Gordon Cuthbert

2006 Gordon Cuthbert was named MVP by his team after a successful season on the mound and at the plate. A right-handed pitcher, he was one of the original Northstars that broke away from the Blue Sox in 1996. He was rewarded for his "solid and consistent pitching" and "good offensive numbers". He was also named MVP in 1998.

2005 One year after being named most improved player, Northstars first baseman and pitcher Sean Shackley was presented with the MVP award recording a batting average of .360 and slugging percentage of .560.

2004 Player coach Stephen Van Houten was the choice for team MVP in 2004. He led the Baseball Ireland adult league in stolen bases with 18 swipes in 18 games, had a batting average of .400, an OBP of .531, scored 25 runs and drove in 18.

2003 Joe Mladnich from Florida was named 2003 MVP after a successful all-round year. In a losing season, Mladnich was the only Northstars' pitcher to finish the year with a winning record, ending with two wins and one loss and with an ERA of 5.48. At the plate, Mladnich batted .286, had an OBP of .353, scored nine runs, drove in five and stole five bases.

== Honours ==
A League

- Playoffs: (3)– 2010, 2013, 2014

B League

- Winners: (1)– 2016
- Runners-up: (1)– 2013
- Playoffs: (2)– 2013, 2014

League Trophy

- Runners-up: (1)– 2005

== Uniform colour and design ==
Belfast Northstars maroon and gold home uniform

When the team plays on the road it changes to gold shirts with 'Belfast' written on the front in maroon lettering. Grey road shirts were worn for the opening game of the 2007 season against Twins United in Dublin.

On one occasion during the 2006 season the Northstars changed from its traditional maroon and gold and instead played in black shirts.

== Honouring Irish McIlveen ==
On 1 July 2006, the Northstars team wore black shirts and Pittsburgh Pirates caps to mark the 100th anniversary of Irish McIlveen's major league debut.

Acclaimed as a "phenomenon" during baseball's "deadball era", McIlveen remains Belfast's only link to the major leagues. He made his debut, pitching for the Pirates on 4 July 1906.

The 2006 game against the Dublin Spartans was won fittingly by Spartans left-handed pitcher Chaime Cuevas.

In addition, Northstars infielder Simon Doyle wears uniform number 53, the number of major league games played by McIlveen in his short career.

== The Belfast Wolves ==
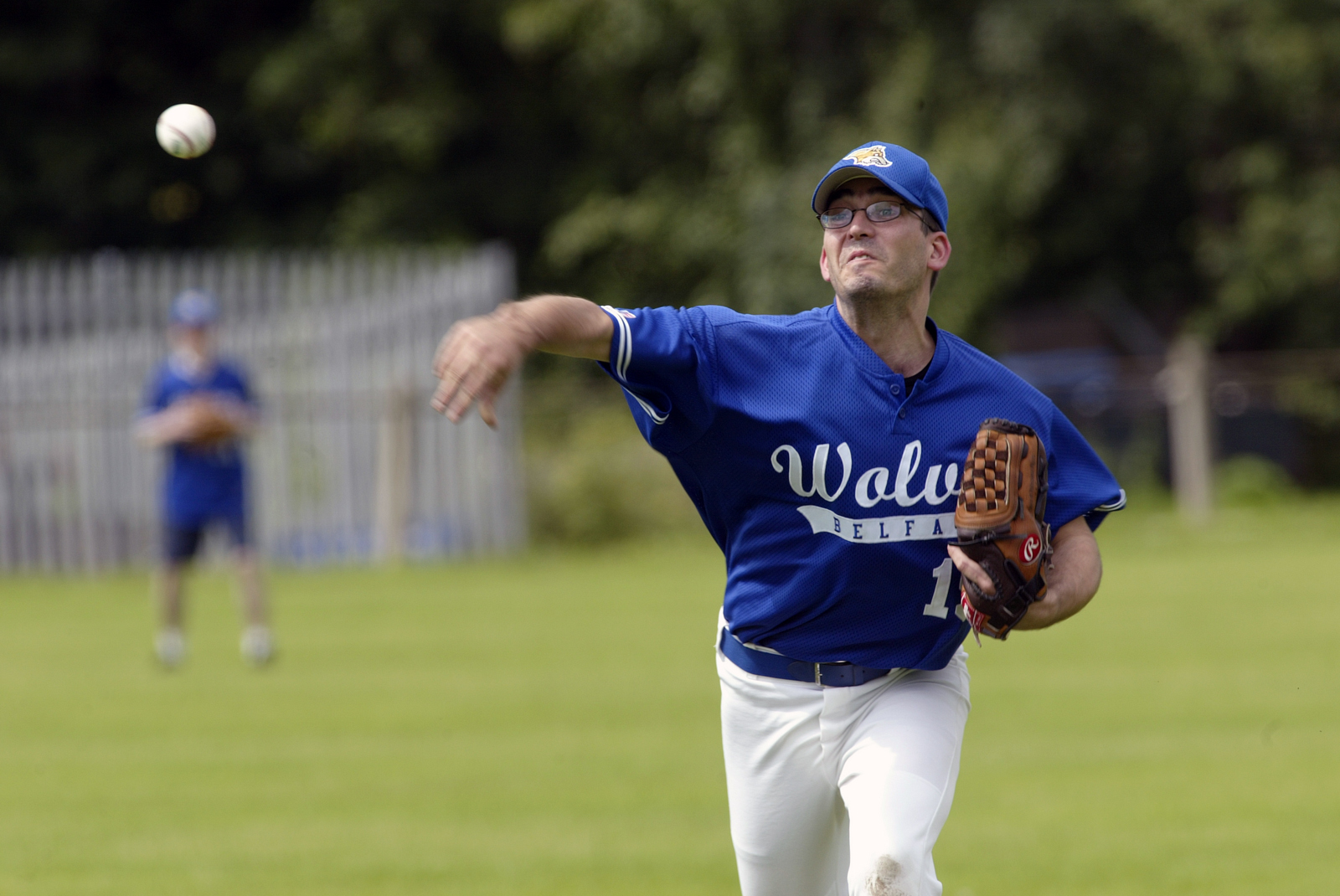
Wolves pitcher Conor Dawson in league action against Greystones.

A second Belfast team was added to Baseball Ireland ahead of the 2004 season. The Belfast Wolves took their name from the city's Harland and Wolff shipyard. The team was the brainchild of then Northstars player-coach Stephen Van Houten and was an attempt to lay the groundwork towards the creation of a northern division of Baseball Ireland.

The Wolves team struggled for two years in the adult league, winning just a handful of games, before being relegated to the status of Northstars' farm team for the 2006 season. At the end of their third season, the Wolves were dissolved, with the players joining the Northstars roster for the 2007 season.

The Northstars and Wolves had faced each other on five occasions in the 2004 and 2005 seasons, with the Northstars winning every time.

== In film/television ==
The Emerald Diamond, a documentary film released in 2006 that chronicles the history of baseball in Ireland and the Irish National team, features footage of a 2005 Northstars game against the Blue Devils of Dublin.

On 15 March 2007, Ulster Television broadcast a short documentary entitled "Fastball", which told the story of how baseball helped US-born players cope with homesickness. The film featured footage of Northstars games, interviews with players and also delved into the history of baseball in Belfast.
