= Greg Hamilton =

Canadian baseball player and coach

Greg Hamilton is a Canadian baseball player, coach and executive.

Hamilton was born in Toronto, Ontario, and grew up in Peterborough, Ontario. He played hockey as a freshman at Princeton University, then became a pitcher for the baseball team. Hamilton was on the Ivy League champions in 1991. He also was assistant coach for two years at Princeton. In 1992, Hamilton was hired as the pitching coach for Team Canada. He got a job as pitching coach and GM of the Barracudas de Montpellier of Division Élite in France in 1993 and helped the team to three titles in a row, their most successful run to date (as of 2007). Part of his success came from his recruitment of Jeff Zimmerman, who became the most notable player to emerge from the French league in the 20th century. He was pitching coach for the French national team in 1994, making him pitching coach for two senior national teams on different continents.

Hamilton left Team Canada in 1996 to become head coach of the Canadian junior national team, leading them to a bronze medal in the 1997 World Junior Championship. He was named Baseball Canada Coach of the Year that season. It was also his last year as Montpellier's coach and GM.

Hamilton was an assistant coach at the University of Maine in 1998, taking a break from coaching the junior Canadian national team. He returned to his role as junior national team coach in 1999. Hamilton also coached for Team Canada's senior team in the 2004 Olympics, 2007 Baseball World Cup, 2008 Final Olympic Qualification Tournament, 2008 Olympics and 2010 Pan American Games Qualification Tournament. He serves as director and General Manager of Team Canada.
