= Baseball at the Inter-Allied Games =

1919 baseball tournament

1919 Inter-Allied Games
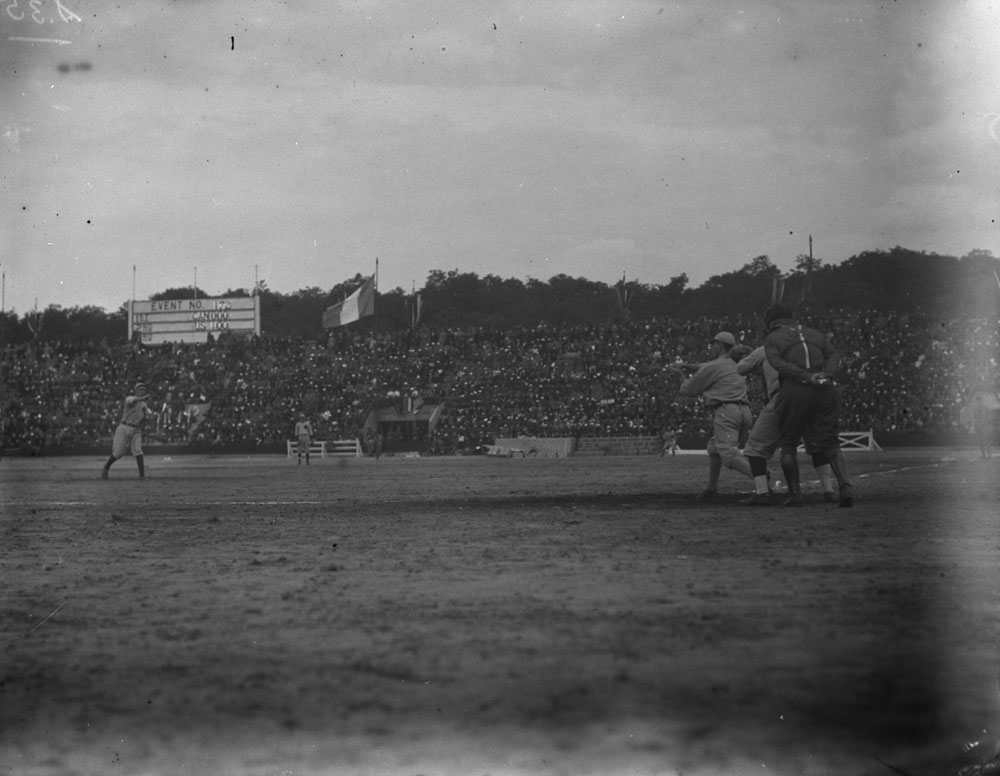

Tournament details
- Country: France
- City: Paris
- Venue: 1 (in 1 host city)
- Dates: 23 June – 6 July
- Teams: 4

Final positions
- Champions: United States (1st title)
- Runners-up: Canada

Baseball was played at the Inter-Allied Games, a multi-sport tournament held in June 1919 and organized by the United States military and the YMCA. It took place in June 1919, nearly a year after the armistice brought an end to the fighting of World War I. All of the games were played at the newly constructed Stade Pershing (named after American general John J. Pershing) in Paris.

Two teams represented the United States and, in its international baseball debut, Canada; both teams were composed entirely of soldiers from the American and Canadian Expeditionary Force. In a best-of-four series, the United States defeated Canada three games to one.

== Background ==
Baseball was played extensively by Canadian soldiers, who were stationed on the western front as early as 1914, and later, by American soldiers, after the U.S. joined the war in 1917. With the cessation of hostilities in 1918, Unrest among soldiers awaiting repatriation caused officers to encourage baseball, in an effort to boost morale. An Anglo-American Baseball League was formed in early 1919, with games between all-star Canadian and American teams being held at Stamford Bridge and elsewhere in England.

== Venue ==
Paris, France	Baseball at the Inter-Allied Games is located in Paris
Stade Pershing	Baseball at the Inter-Allied Games is located in Paris

== Teams ==
The United States was represented by the "Le Mans" team, of the 86th "Blackhawk" Infantry Division, that had won the American Expeditionary Forces league championship (a three-game series against the Third Division team). One former major leaguer was Adam DeBus, a sergeant and former infielder that played a single season with the Pittsburgh Pirates in 1917; DeBus had spent the war years at Camp Grant in Illinois, but was shipped to France after the Armistice. DeBus captained the United States team at the games. Also part of the U.S. team was William Marriott, who had played in 1917 with the Chicago Cubs and would go on to stints with the Boston Braves and Brooklyn Robins. Several other Americans had minor league experience, including Wheeler "Moose" Fuller, who had a long career with various Eastern League clubs. (Note: Contemporary reports refer to Fuller as having played in the majors with the Washington Senators, but this is not supported by MLB records.)

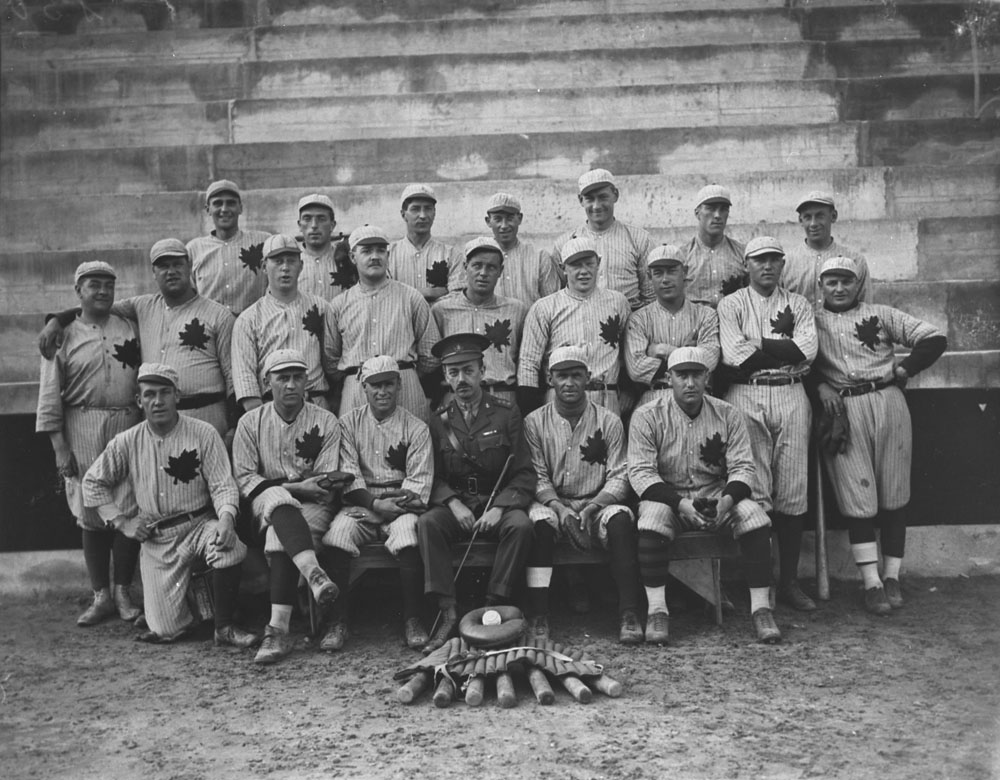
The Canada national team

The Canadian team was also the champion of the Canadian Expeditionary Force league, selected by a series in London and reinforced by the best players from other Canadian teams. Many of these soldiers were from the "Artillery" team, champions of the Witley area. None of the Canadian players had major league experience, though Larry Carmel would later play with the Montreal Royals and Quebec Bulldogs of the Eastern Canada League. Three of the Canadian players (Ernest Tate, John Edis, and Paul Gilpatrick) were born in the United States, though at least two of them served in the Canadian Army.

One of the umpires was "Smiling Al" Orth, a former MLB pitcher who had traveled to Europe to care for his son, wounded in the Meuse–Argonne offensive.

=== Rosters ===
Canada

Canada — "Artillery"
Roster
Pitchers: Pvt. Ernest Kurd; Pvt. Ernest Tate; Gnr. Ralph E. Clayton; Sgt. Richard B. Odgers; Pvt. Maurice Daly; Sgt. Fred A. Barker; Sgt. Norman H. Chalmers; Catchers: Cpl. Victor C. Sheppard; Pvt. Earle S. Peckham	Infielders: Cpt. John F. Edis; Pvt. Whitney G. Dewhurst; Pvt. Alfred Klaehn; Pvt. William N. Wright; Pvt. Larry Latimer; Pvt. Paul Gilpatrick	Outfielders: Pvt. Larry Carmel; Pvt. Frank S. Smith; Spr. Clarence W. Robinson; Cpl. Alexander T. Thompson

United States

United States — "Le Mans"
Roster
Pitchers: 2nd Lt. Wheeler B. Fuller; Sgt. George Taylor; Pvt. Englebert W. Becker; Cpl. James Duben; Sgt. Ira Creel; Sgt. Ernest Chambers; Catchers: Cpl. William Novak; 2nd Lt. N.J. Fish; Pvt. Vernon W. Lightfoot	Infielders: Sgt. Jesse Gross; Sgt. Adam DeBus (cpt.); Sgt. William E. Marriott; Cpl. Henning Anderson; Cpl. Simon P. Brausen	Outfielders: Pvt. Faber J. O'Hara; Pvt. Harry Knapp; Sgt. Lloyd Dean; Cpl. Edward Aaron

== Summary ==
The first two games of the series were relatively close and characterized by pitching duels between the starters. In the first game, American starter Moose Fuller kept the Canadians to a single hit over eight innings of work. Canada won the second game thanks to starter Ernest Tate, who took a no-hitter into the ninth inning before it was broken up by the U.S.'s Henning Anderson.

After the June 27 game, the American team traveled to Germany for a three-game exhibition series, while the Canadians waited in Paris without playing. The wait became evident in the final two games of the series, which the U.S. won convincingly. The fourth game, played on July 6, was called after seven innings, so as not to conflict with the closing ceremonies of the games.

The championship trophy was presented by Hu Weide, ambassador of the Republic of China to France.

== Results ==
=== Game 1, June 23 ===
June 23, 1919 at Stade Pershing, Paris
Team	1	2	3	4	5	6	7	8	9	R	H	E
Canada	0	0	0	0	0	0	0	0	0	0	1	5
United States	0	0	3	0	0	0	1	1	X	5	6	4
WP: Wheeler Fuller LP: Ralph Clayton; Umpires: Al Orth; Frambes; Boxscore

=== Game 2, June 27 ===
June 27, 1919 at Stade Pershing, Paris
Team	1	2	3	4	5	6	7	8	9	R	H	E
United States	0	0	0	0	0	0	1	0	0	1	1	0
Canada	0	0	0	2	0	0	0	0	X	2	5	1
WP: Ernest Tate LP: George Taylor; Umpires: Al Orth; Frambes; Boxscore

=== Game 3, July 4 ===
July 4, 1919 at Stade Pershing, Paris
Team	1	2	3	4	5	6	7	8	9	R	H	E
Canada	0	0	0	0	0	0	0	0	0	0	1	6
United States	1	0	0	0	0	1	2	6	X	10	9	2
WP: Wheeler Fuller LP: Norman Chalmers; Umpires: Al Orth; Roth; Boxscore

=== Game 4, July 6 ===
June 23, 1919 at Stade Pershing, Paris
Team	1	2	3	4	5	6	7	R	H	E
United States	0	0	3	0	3	2	4	12	8	1
Canada	1	0	0	0	0	0	0	1	3	10
WP: George Taylor LP: Ernest Tate; Umpires: Al Orth; Roth; Boxscore

== Statistical leaders ==
Statistic	Player	Total
Batting average	(United States) Henning Anderson	.461
Bases on balls	(United States) Simon P. Brausen	5
Runs scored	(United States) Simon P. Brausen	5
Fielding percentage	(Canada) Larry Carmel (Canada) Alexander Thompson (United States) Simon P. Brausen (United States) Lloyd Dean	1.000

== See also ==
- Baseball in France
- Ty Cobb, a Hall-of-Fame MLB player and World War I veteran who was in attendance at the Inter-Allied Games, but did not participate in the baseball tournament.

== Bibliography ==
- George Wythe; Joseph Mills Hanson, eds. (1919). The Inter-Allied Games - Paris, 22nd June to 6th July, 1919. Internet Archive: Games Committee. pp. 180–82, 476.
- Walt C. Johnson; Elwood S. Brown, eds. (1919). "Baseball". Official Athletic Almanac of the American Expeditionary Forces. American Sports Publishing. pp. 337–43.
