= Spalding World Tour =

The Spalding World Tour was an exhibition baseball tournament that circumnavigated the globe from in October 1888 to April 1889. Financed by former player and sporting goods executive Albert Spalding, the tour – composed of Spalding's own Chicago White Stockings and a team of "All-Americans" – travelled to Australia, Egypt, Italy, France, England, Ireland and the United States.

The purpose of the world tour was to promote the sport of Baseball nationally across the United States and globally. At the time, sportswriter Henry Chadwick called it "the greatest event in the modern history of athletic sports."

== Tour ==
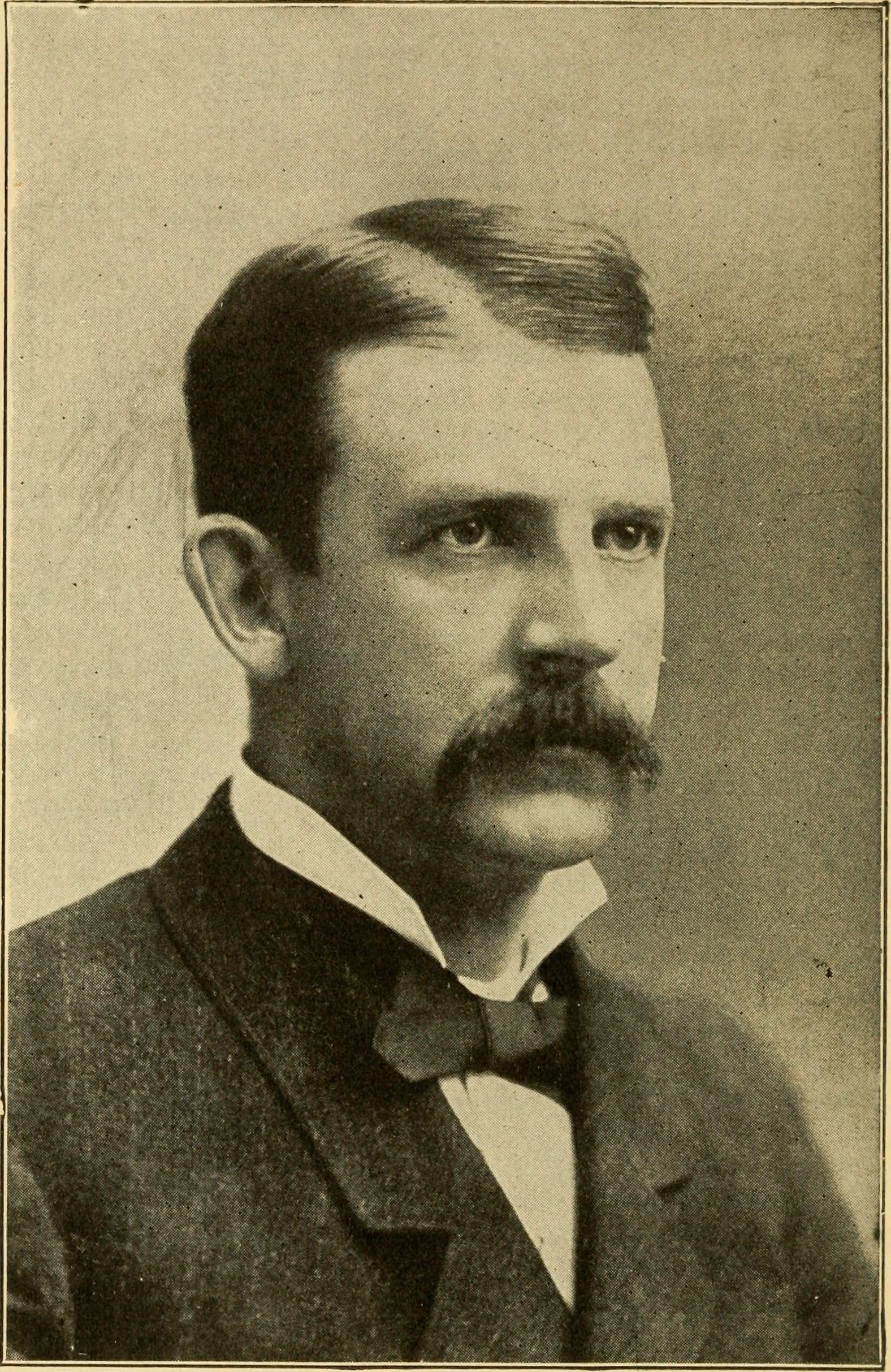
Albert Spalding in 1879

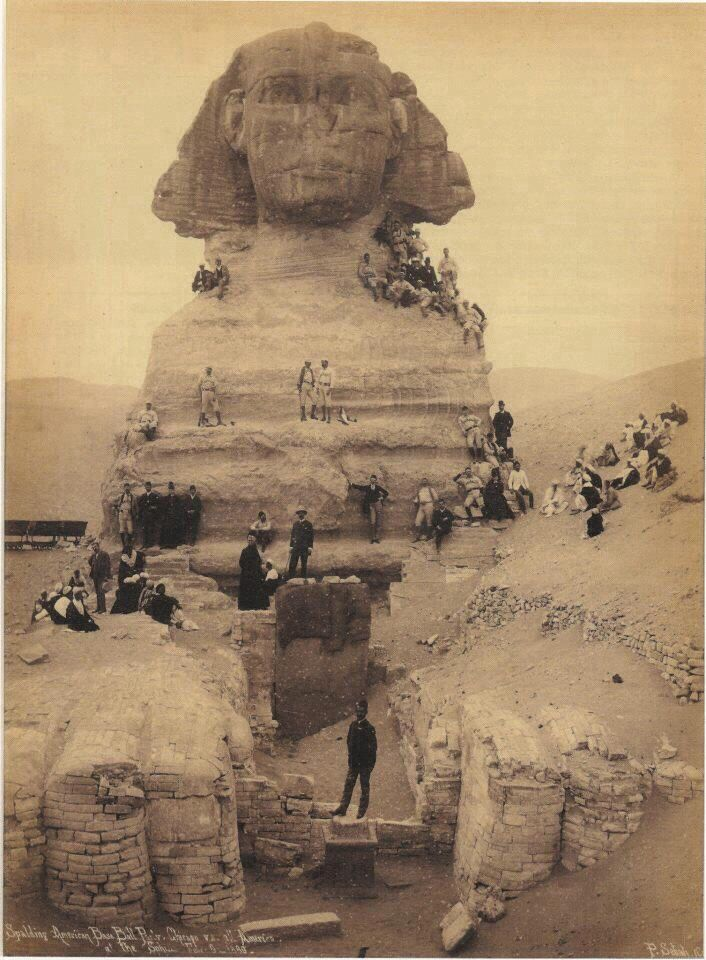
Members of the Spalding Tour climb on the Sphinx in Egypt as part of a tour stop in Cairo, Febr. 9 1889

The idea of a world tour originated with Chris von der Ahe, owner of the St. Louis Brown Stockings and president of the American Association, who initially explored the possibility of a trip to Europe in early 1888. Von der Ahe later pivoted to endorsing an Australian trip, noting that "such a trip would introduce the game to thousands who have never yet seen it." There was briefly talk of an Australian tour organized by Boston Beaneaters manager James Hart, which would have included Buck Ewing, King Kelly, and John Montgomery Ward. Spalding's trip was announced on March 28; he said that the undertaking of such a trip was done "more for the purpose of extending my sporting goods business to that quarter of the globe and creating a market for goods there, rather than with any idea of realizing any profit from the work of the teams I take with me."

Spalding's own Chicago White Stockings fell to the New York Giants in the race for the 1888 National League pennant, but still included Cap Anson and Jimmy Ryan, who led the league in batting average. The opposing "All-Americans" were captained by John Montgomery Ward of the Giants. The Sporting News charged that Spalding had signed fourth-rate players because he was too cheap to offer the kind of money that would attract the best; Charles Comiskey expressed interest in going, but said Spalding's offers "were not even enough for cigar money." Other active future Hall-of-Famers not on the roster included batters Roger Connor and Dan Brouthers, as well as pitchers Tim Keefe and Pud Galvin.

After playing several exhibition games across the country, the tour left San Francisco on November 17. They were received in Honolulu, capital of the then-independent Kingdom of Hawaii, by King Kalākaua, but played their first overseas exhibition game in Auckland, New Zealand on December 10. The tour played several games in Australia from December 15 to January 5, in Sydney, Melbourne, Adelaide, and Ballarat. Notably, the White Stockings played a four-inning game against a squad of Melbourne cricket players — the modern Melbourne Baseball Club — before a crowd of 12,000; cricketer William Bruce was pitcher for the Melbourne side. After the tour left Australia, Spalding's aide Harry Simpson helped organize baseball leagues in Victoria (1890) and New South Wales (1891); he was inducted into the Baseball Australia Hall of Fame in its inaugural class of 2005.

The tour stopped briefly in Colombo, Sri Lanka (then British Ceylon) before making their way to Egypt. The players visited the Great Sphinx of Giza, setting up a makeshift field with the pyramids in the distance. John Healy, nicknamed "The Egyptian" due to his hometown of Cairo, Illinois, pitched against the White Stockings.

In Rome, Spalding's plans to book a game at the Colosseum were rejected by local officials. Instead, he arranged for an exhibition to be held on the grounds of the Villa Borghese gardens, before King Umberto I and his wife, Queen Margherita of Savoy.

== International rosters ==
Personnel in bold have since been inducted into the National Baseball Hall of Fame.

=== Chicago ===
Position	Player	Team
P	Mark Baldwin	White Stockings (NL)
P	John Tener	White Stockings (NL)
C	Tom Daly	White Stockings (NL)
1B	**Cap Anson**	White Stockings (NL)
2B	Fred Pfeffer	White Stockings (NL)
3B	Tom Burns	White Stockings (NL)
SS	Ned Williamson	White Stockings (NL)
LF	Marty Sullivan	White Stockings (NL)
CF	Jimmy Ryan	White Stockings (NL)
RF	Bob Pettit	White Stockings (NL)

=== All-Americans ===
Position	Player	Team
P	Long John Healy	Hoosiers (NL)
P	Eddie Crane	Giants (NL)
C	Fred Carroll	Alleghenys (NL)
1B	George Wood	Quakers (NL)
2B	Herman Long	Cowboys (AA)
3B	Jim Manning	Cowboys (AA)
SS	**John Montgomery Ward**	Giants (NL)
LF	Jim Fogarty	Quakers (NL)
CF	**Ned Hanlon**	Wolverines (NL)
RF	Billy Earle	Red Stockings (AA)

== Bibliography ==
- Mark Lamster, Spalding's World Tour: The Epic Adventure that Took Baseball Around the Globe - And Made It America's Game, PublicAffairs, 2006, 368 p. ISBN 1586483110
