= Frédéric Hanvi =

French baseball player (born 1989)

- Frédéric Hanvi giving a TV interview in France after signing his Minor League contract

Free Agent
- Outfielder
- Born: 2 May 1989 (age 36); Senlis, France
- Bats: Right Throws: Right
- Stats at Baseball Reference

Frédéric Hanvi (born 2 May 1989 in Senlis, France) is a French baseball player, having played for several junior national teams in France, and for several French pro teams before being scouted by Major League Baseball. He was signed to a seven-year Minor League Contract with the Minnesota Twins organization. He is the second French player to be signed to a Major League contract after Joris Bert. The Twins have also promised to free him to play with Team France during official competitions. He is currently a free agent. He played for Team France in the 2019 European Baseball Championship.

== Career ==
After starting with the Cougars de Montigny, Frédéric worked his way up through the training program put in place by the FFBC, playing for Rouen in 2004-2005, then for Team France at the INSEP in 2005-2006, then for Toulouse in 2006-2007. Since 2006, he's worn the Tigers de Toulouse uniform. While playing for Toulouse, he was part of the second place championship Team France in 2006 and a third place finish in the European Baseball Cup in 2007.

While playing for the junior team, he has won 3 national titles: the French Minor Championship in 2004, and the French Junior Championship in 2005 and 2006.

With Team France, he was part of the winning under-21 team that won the second place European Championship in 2006.

On 7 August 2007 he signed a contract with the Minnesota Twins organization. Being only 18 years old he must first graduate from high school in France. He played for the Tigers de Toulouse until June 2008, then participated in the training camps of the Academy Minor League in Australia from 30 June to 15 August 2008. He played in the Australian professional league from September 2008 until February 2009, when he joined the Gulf Coast League Twins in the United States.

On October 1, 2018, he selected 2018 exhibition games against South Africa.

He played for Team France in the 2019 European Baseball Championship.

== Personal life ==
Hanvi was born in France, and is of Togolese descent.

== Sources ==
This article draws heavily on the fr:Frédéric Hanvi article in the French-language Wikipedia, which was accessed in the version of 16 September 2008.
