= Baseball in Ireland =

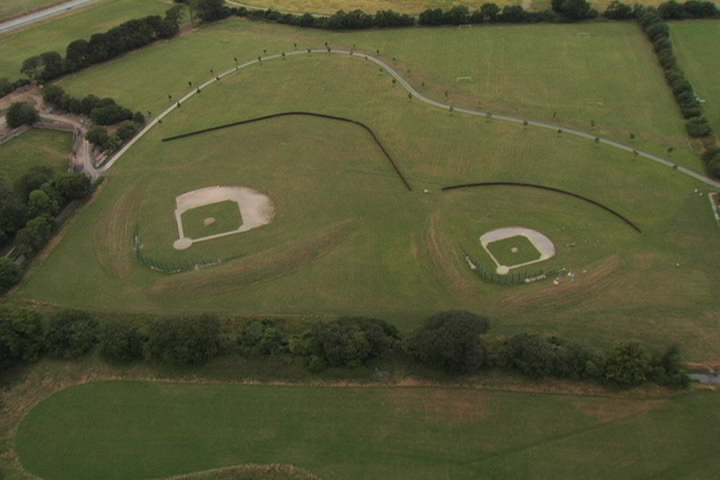
Aerial view of O'Malley Fields in Dublin, Ireland

The first baseball game in Ireland was held in Dublin in 1874, and it continues to be played by several teams including in the Irish Baseball League. Baseball Ireland is the governing body of baseball on the island of Ireland, covering both Northern Ireland and the Republic of Ireland.

== History ==
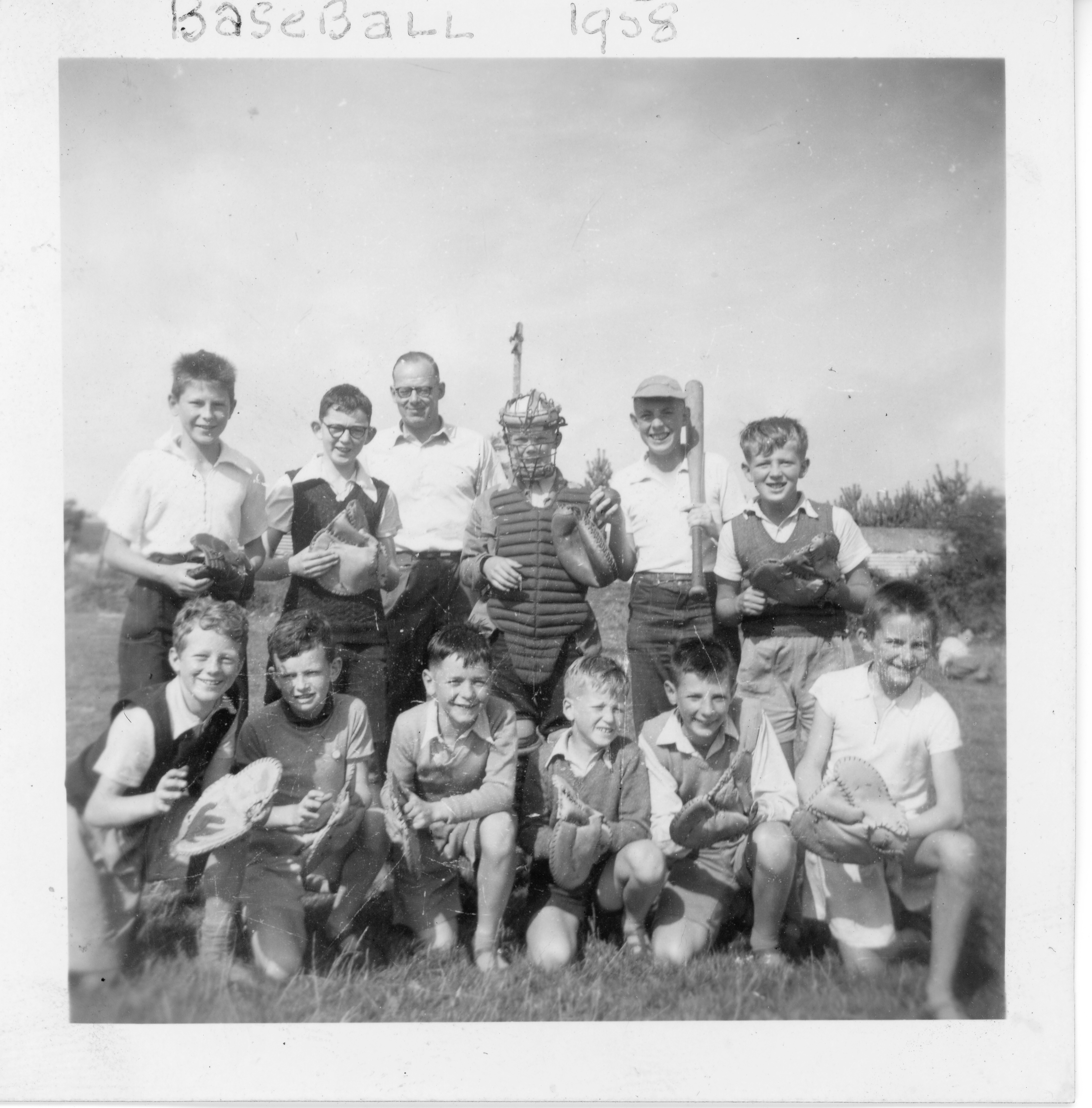
Tramore Sea Lions, 1958

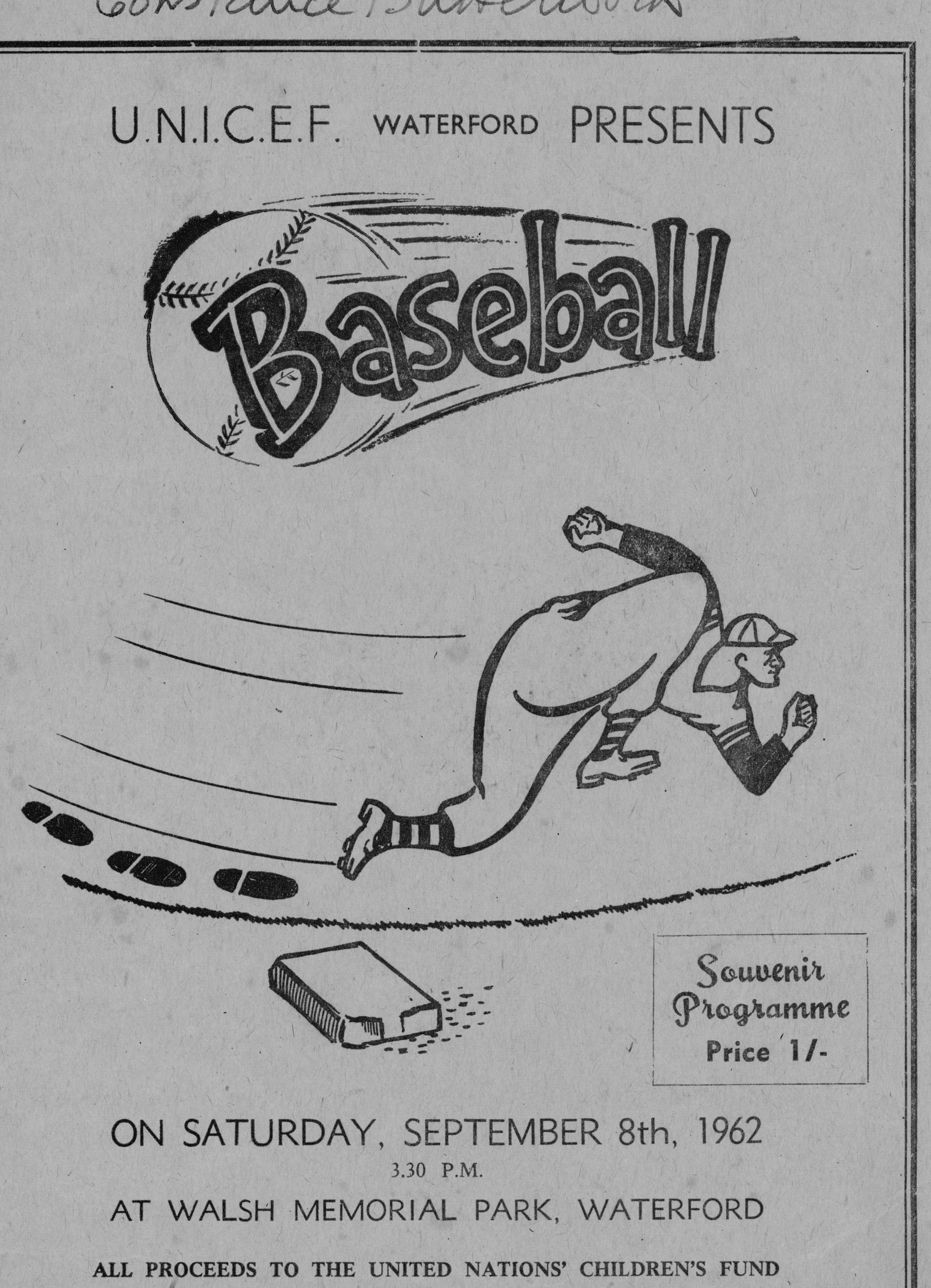
Baseball program from an exhibition baseball game in Waterford, Ireland, September 1962

The first baseball game in Ireland was played in 1874, when the Boston Red Stockings played the Philadelphia Athletics in Dublin.

In 1942 and 1943, several games were played in Belfast among teams of US servicemen.

The first organised baseball team in Ireland was the Tramore Sea Lions. The Sea Lions were a youth team in Tramore, County Waterford. The team was organised and coached by local businessman Clive Butterworth.

In 2019, the Irish American Baseball Society and Irish American Baseball Hall of Fame announced the creation of the Clive Butterworth Award. The award recognises "outstanding volunteer service" among youth baseball coaches in Ireland.

== Ireland's national baseball team ==
The Irish national baseball team has been in existence since 1996 and has taken part in several major baseball tournaments and tours.

Ireland played its first game in international competition in 1996 against the Czech Republic, losing by a score of 23–2. Ireland's national team has won at least one game in every tournament it has entered including 1996, in Kingston upon Hull.

The Emerald Diamond, a documentary film released in 2006, chronicled the history of baseball in Ireland and the Irish National Baseball Team.

=== Competition ===
The Irish national baseball team won its first bronze medal at the 2004 European Championships in Germany. In August 2006, the team won the silver medal at the European Championships held in Antwerp, Belgium. They also competed in the European championships held in Vienna in Austria, Stockholm, Karlovac, Abranches, Antwerp, Barcelona and Ljubljana.

In 2018, the team won the gold medal at the European Baseball Championship tournament held at the International Baseball Centre in Ashbourne, County Meath. By winning, the team advanced to the next round of Olympic qualifying in 2019.

== Irish Baseball League ==
Although the existence of baseball in Ireland is not widely known, the game has been played there since the early 1990s. What began with a few friends playing pickup games on football and rugby fields in Dublin and Greystones, soon grew into a small league.

In the years since, baseball has spread elsewhere Ireland, being played in Ashbourne, Clones, County Cork, Shankhill, Greystones, Dublin and Belfast.

The Irish Baseball League was founded in 1997. Participating teams come from Dublin, Ashbourne, Belfast, Clones, Cork, Greystones and Portmarnock. Baseball Ireland is the governing body of baseball on the island of Ireland, covering both Northern Ireland and the Republic of Ireland.

=== Competing teams ===
As of 2023, teams competing in the league included:

Team Name	Location	Home Field	Divisions
Ashbourne Giants	Ashbourne, County Meath	International Baseball Centre	A, B
Ashbourne Stags	Ashbourne, County Meath	International Baseball Centre	B
Ashbourne Titans	Ashbourne, County Meath	International Baseball Centre	B
Ulster Buccaneers	Belfast, Northern Ireland	Hydebank Playing Fields	B
Belfast Northstars	Belfast, Northern Ireland	Hydebank Playing Fields	B
Cork Renegades	Cork, County Cork	Brian Dillons GAA	B. C
Dublin Spartans	Clondalkin, County Dublin	O'Malley Fields	A, B
Dublin City Hurricanes	Clondalkin, County Dublin	O'Malley Fields	A, B
Greystones Mariners	Shankill, County Dublin	Shanganagh Park	A, B
Greystones Vikings	Shankill, County Dublin	Shanganagh Park	B
Portmarnock Red Rox	Portmarnock, County Dublin	Beechwood Sports Field	B.C

== Youth baseball ==
The Irish cadet team (13–18) played in a Dutch tournament held in Alphen aan den Rijn Netherlands. The Irish team came home with a bronze medal, with Amsterdam Pirates receiving the runners-up prize.

== See also ==
- Baseball awards § Ireland
