= The Emerald Diamond =

- Directed by: John Fitzgerald
- Release date: 11 November 2006
- Running time: 114 minutes
- Country: Ireland
- Language: English

The Emerald Diamond is a documentary following the history of Baseball Ireland and the Irish national baseball team directed by John Fitzgerald and starring Chris Foy. It was released in 2006.

Director John Fitzgerald financed the film almost entirely on credit cards while working freelance at various jobs in the TV and film industries. The film crew was made up of professionals from in and around Fitzgerald's hometown of Valhalla, NY, with each crew member coincidentally living in towns along the Metro North Railroad's Harlem Line – leading to the creation of Harlem Line Pictures and, later, Harlem Line Media.

== Release ==
Although the film received positive reviews from The New York Times, New York Post, Irish Echo, and National Public Radio, Fitzgerald opted to release it immediately before receiving a traditional distribution deal. On 25 February 2006, The Emerald Diamond debuted to a sold out crowd of 250 people at the Jacob Burns Film Center in New York. Among those in the crowd was Major League Baseball Executive Vice-President Robert Manfred. Manfred was taken with the Irish National Team's story and promised to help the film and the team in any way he could. He arranged to have the film's trailer played at Shea Stadium (New York), Hubert H. Humphrey Metrodome (Minneapolis), and AT&T Park (San Francisco).

The Emerald Diamond was screened in theatres in 22 US cities and two Irish cities, between February and August 2006. Many of the US screenings were sponsored by Irish heritage organisations, baseball museums or Irish-based vodka company Boru Vodka.

== Film festivals ==
The film received the Critic's Choice Award at the 2006 Baseball Film Festival at the National Baseball Hall of Fame in Cooperstown, NY. The award was selected and presented by film critic Jeffrey Lyons.

== Media reviews ==
The film received positive reviews from The New York Times, New York Post, National Public Radio and several Irish-American newspapers. In addition, the film was featured by Fox News, National Public Radio and Boston's CBS-4. The attraction of major media outlets is rare for a low-budget film, but was likely due to the underdog story of the Irish National Team, coupled with Fitzgerald's determination to make the film entirely on credit cards.

- "Think of Rudy, the Notre Dame walk-on, and multiply it by about a dozen." – Jack Curry, The New York Times
- "A terrific film!" – Kevin Kernan, The New York Post
- "A tale of perseverance, salted with humor and irrigated with beer." – Bill Littlefield, National Public Radio
- "Emerald Diamond restores the innocence of the sport for 90 wonderful minutes, easily ranking as one of the best documentaries I've seen this year. The Irish National Baseball Team, much like other countries currently building their clubs, is where the heart of the game lies today. I highly recommend this opportunity to live the dream with these hard-working men and their amazing journey." – Brian Orndorff, DVD Talk

== Related projects ==
After winning the Critic's Choice Award at the 2006 Baseball Film Festival, Fitzgerald confirmed that he was writing a feature film script based on the story of the Irish National Baseball Team. He noted that the script will contain several stories that didn't make it to the documentary. He refused to confirm or deny interest or involvement of any actors.

Fitzgerald also announced that he has founded a nonprofit group to help further the development of Irish youth baseball and the Irish National Baseball Team. The organisation is called "The Baseball United Foundation" and is focused on making the game of baseball accessible to communities where the game is not traditionally played.
