= Baseball in Egypt =

- Country: Egypt
- Governing body: Baseball Egypt
- National teams: Men's national team; Women's national team

Baseball in Egypt is a minor sport.

== History ==
The sport has its foundation in the early 1880s as part of Spalding World Tour.

== Bibliography ==
- Bjarkman, Peter C. (2005). Diamonds Around The Globe: The Encyclopedia Of International Baseball. Greenwood Press. ISBN 9780313322686.
