= French Federation of Baseball and Softball =

- Sport: Baseball and softball
- Abbreviation: FFBS
- Founded: 1924
- President: Thierry Raphet

Official website
- www.ffbs.fr

The French Federation of Baseball and Softball (FFBS) is an authority managing baseball and softball in France. It also manages cricket in a committee founded by an independent affiliated association, France Cricket. The FFBS was founded in October 1924 by Frantz Reichel who was its first president (1924-1931).

Today, the FFBS is in a mission of being recognized as a public utility by the Ministry of Sports. It is part of the Olympic movement (baseball was an Olympic discipline between 1992 and 2008) and is a member of the French National Olympic and Sports Committee. It is a member of the European Baseball Confederation and the European Softball Federation, of which it is one of the founding members, as well as the International Baseball Federation and the International Softball Federation.
