= Adam DeBus =

German-American baseball player (1892–1977)

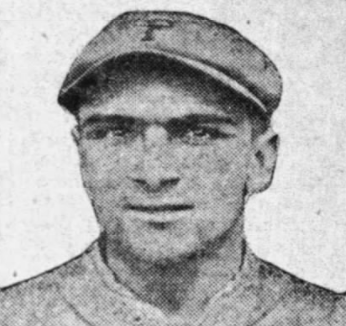
- Shortstop / Third baseman
- Born: October 7, 1892; Chicago, Illinois, U.S.
- Died: May 13, 1977 (aged 84); Chicago, Illinois, U.S.
- Batted: Right Threw: Right

MLB debut
- July 14, 1917, for the Pittsburgh Pirates

Last MLB appearance
- September 1, 1917, for the Pittsburgh Pirates

MLB statistics
- Batting average: .229
- Hits: 30
- Runs batted in: 7
- Stats at Baseball Reference

Teams
- Pittsburgh Pirates (1917)
Medals
Men's baseball
Representing United States
Inter-Allied Games
Gold medal – first place	1919 Paris	Team

Adam Joseph DeBus Jr. (October 7, 1892 – May 13, 1977) was a German American professional baseball player whose career spanned three seasons, one of which was spent with the Major League Baseball (MLB) Pittsburgh Pirates (1917). Over his MLB career, DeBus, an infielder, compiled a .229 batting average with nine runs scored, 30 hits, five doubles, four triples, seven runs batted in (RBIs) and two stolen bases in 38 games played. Originally, Debus signed with the MLB St. Louis Cardinals out of the Northern League, but his contract was waived after never making an appearance. He then signed with the Pittsburgh Pirates and made his MLB debut on July 14, 1917, against the Brooklyn Robins. During his career, DeBus weighed 150 pounds (68 kg) and stood at 5 feet 11 inches (180 cm). He batted and threw right-handed.

== Early life ==
Adam Joseph DeBus Jr. was born on October 7, 1892, in Chicago to Josephine and Adam DeBus Sr., both of Germany. Josephine DeBus, who came to the United States in 1882, became a naturalized citizen in 1931. Adam DeBus Sr., who came to the United States in 1878 and was naturalized in 1887, worked as a cook in Chicago. Adam Joseph DeBus Jr. was his parents' only child. He was raised to speak German.

== Baseball career ==
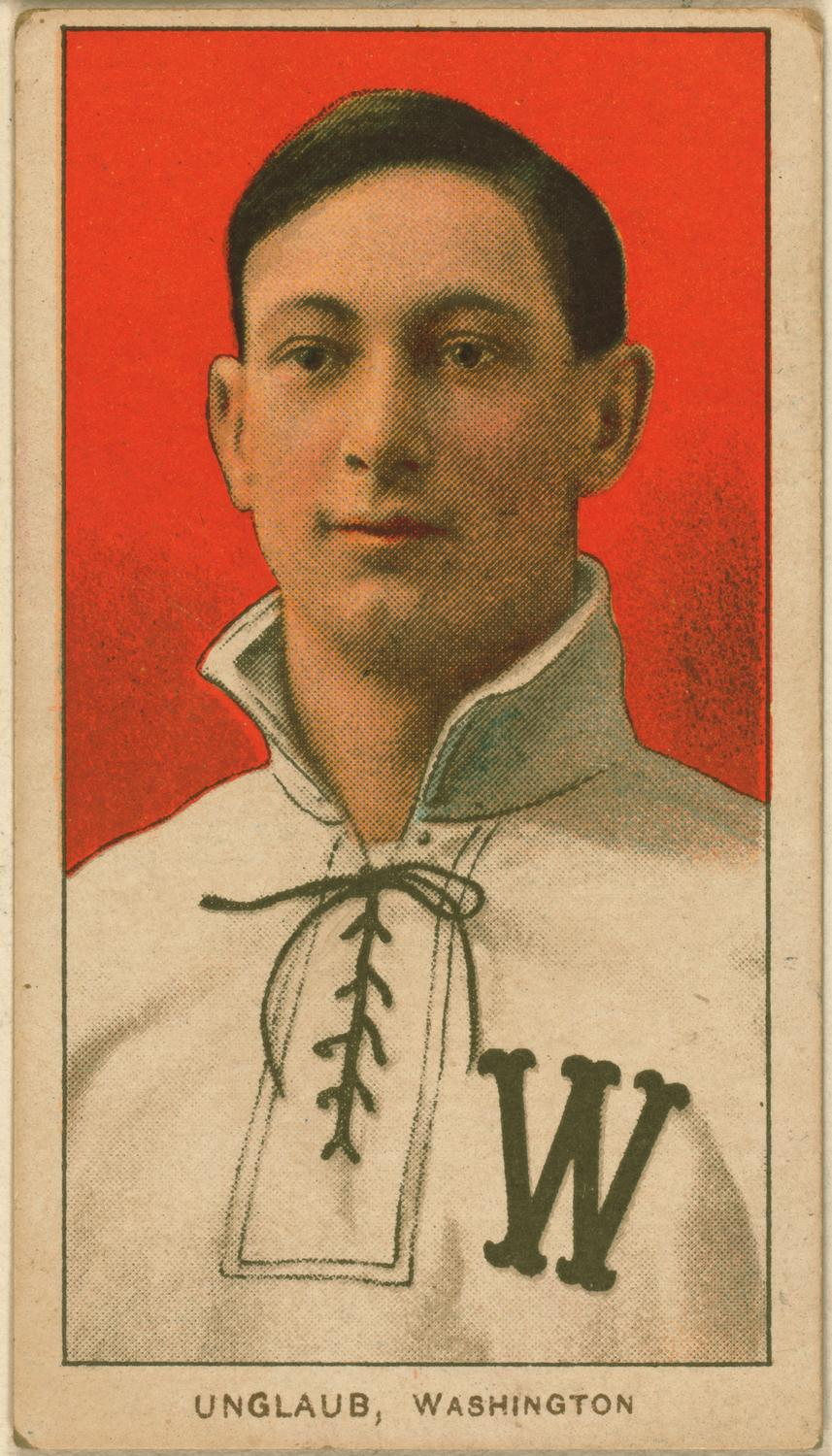
Bob Unglaub (pictured) served as DeBus' manager during the 1916 season.

DeBus' professional baseball career began in 1914 as a member of the minor league Green Bay Bays of the Class-C Wisconsin–Illinois League. He was under the management of Robert Lynch with the Green Bay club. Two of Debus' teammates on the Bays roster, Frank Scanlan and Joe Weiss, had experience in Major League Baseball (MLB) one time or another over their careers. On the season, DeBus compiled a .234 batting average with 91 hits, 14 doubles, three triples and three home runs in 108 games played. All of his 108 games were played at shortstop. His next professional baseball season came two seasons later in 1916 as a member of the minor league Fargo-Moorhead Graingrowers of the Class-C Northern League. The Graingrowers represented Fargo, North Dakota and Moorhead, Minnesota. Three of his teammates on the Graingrowers, Ralph Bell, Moxie Meixell and Bob Unglaub, were MLB players at one time in their careers. The Fargo-Moorhead club was managed by Bob Unglaub, who also played first base for the team. DeBus batted .284 with 96 hits in 100 games played.

DeBus made his MLB debut against Brooklyn pitcher Rube Marquard (pictured)

In 1917, DeBus re-signed with the Fargo-Moorhead Graingrowers. On July 2, he was sold by the Fargo-Moorhead club to the MLB St. Louis Cardinals. On July 11, DeBus was waived after never making an appearance with the club. He was then signed by the Pittsburgh Pirates and reported to the team in Brooklyn, New York. He made his MLB debut in the second game of a doubleheader on July 14, 1917, against the Brooklyn Robins at Ebbets Field. He was sixth in the Pirates batting order. In four at-bats against Brooklyn pitcher Rube Marquard, DeBus went hitless. His first MLB hit came on July 17 against Boston Braves pitcher Art Nehf. On July 20, The Pittsburgh Press wrote that DeBus was a "better than ordinary hitter" and that he could "field with the best of them". In August, it was reported that Pittsburgh manager Hugo Bezdek was pleased with the services of DeBus. The syndicated column "Diamond Dust" compared DeBus to former MLB player Art Devlin. His final MLB appearance came on September 1 against the St. Louis Cardinals. In two at-bats against St. Louis pitcher Oscar Horstmann, DeBus went hitless. On the season with the Pirates, he batted .229 with nine runs scored, 30 hits, five doubles, four triples, seven runs batted in (RBIs) and two stolen bases in 38 games played. Defensively, he played 21 games at shortstop and 18 games at third base. DeBus committed 19 errors, 92 assists and 61 putouts. He also converted 10 double plays. Despite initial success in impressing Pirates manager Hugo Bezdek, by the end of the season The Pittsburgh Press wrote that DeBus "[had] probably donned a Pirate uniform for the last time".

== Later life ==
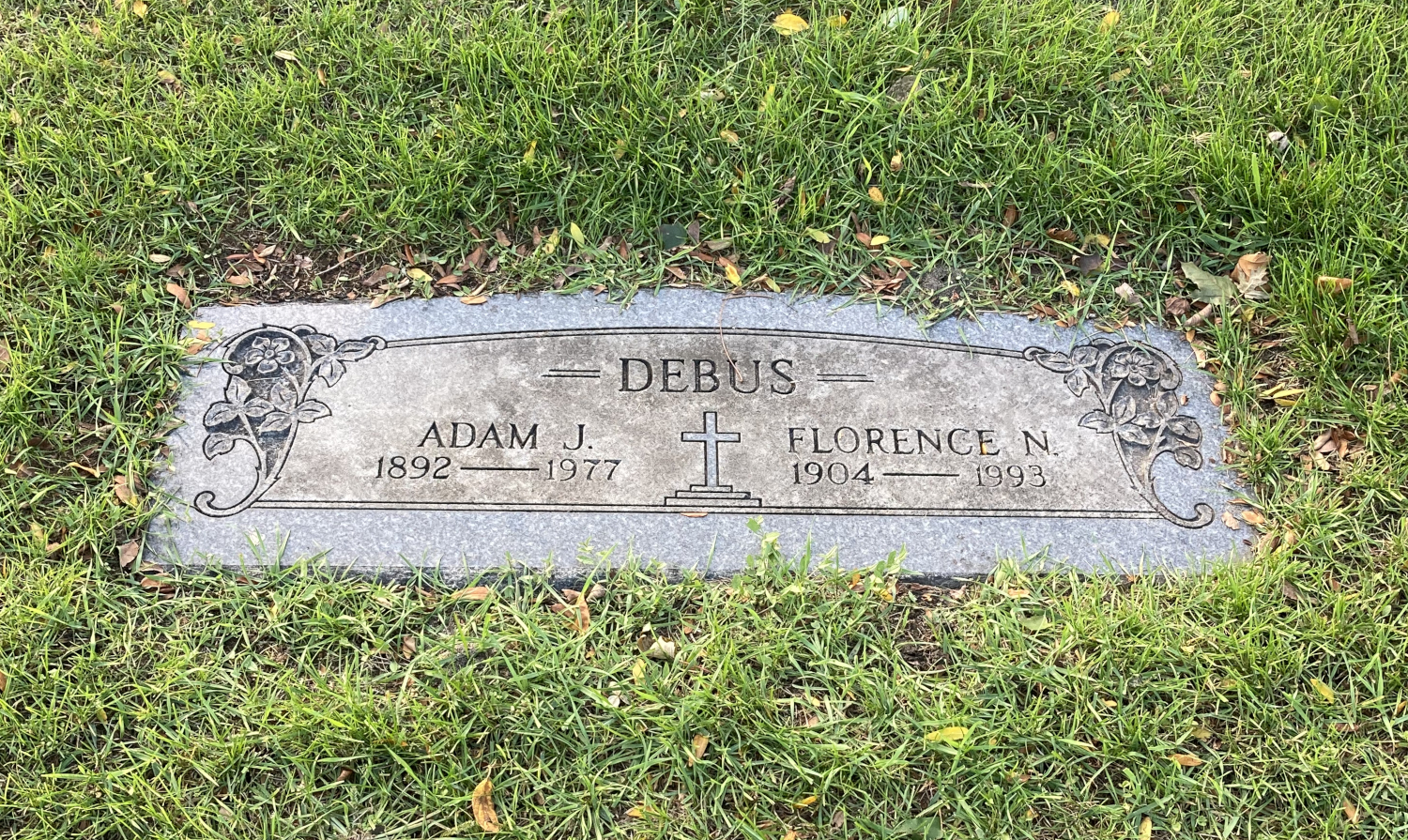
DeBus's grave at St. Boniface Cemetery

At the end of the 1917 baseball season, DeBus joined the United States Military to fight in World War I. He served with the 86th "Blackhawk" Infantry Division, and played with the division's baseball team. At the 1919 Inter-Allied Games, held in Paris for servicemen, he captained the United States team to victory over the Canadian representatives.

After his baseball career was over, he was working for an electrical company based in Chicago. By 1930, he was living with his parents in Chicago working as an electrical auto mechanic. On August 1, 1931, DeBus and his mother boarded the ocean liner SS Bremen in New York City to Germany. By 1942, DeBus was working for Stewart-Warner, a manufacturer of electrical automotive parts. DeBus died on May 13, 1977, in Chicago. He was buried at St. Boniface Cemetery in Chicago.
