= William Marriott (baseball) =

American baseball player (1893–1969)

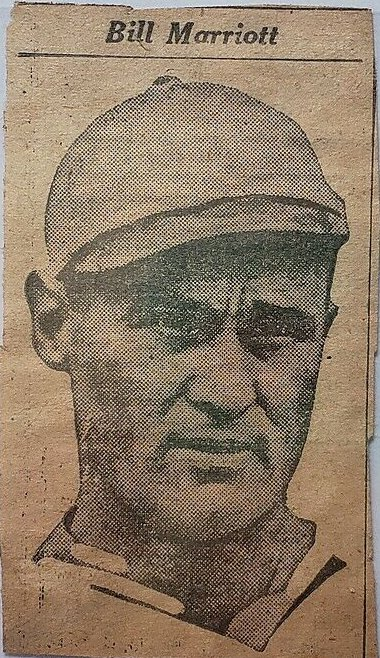
- Third baseman
- Born: August 18, 1893; Pratt, Kansas, U.S.
- Died: August 11, 1969 (aged 75); Berkeley, California, U.S.
- Batted: Left Threw: Right

MLB debut
- September 6, 1917, for the Chicago Cubs

Last MLB appearance
- April 28, 1927, for the Brooklyn Robins

MLB statistics
- Batting average: .266
- Home runs: 4
- Runs batted in: 95
- Stats at Baseball Reference

Teams
- Chicago Cubs (1917, 1920–1921); Boston Braves (1925); Brooklyn Robins (1926–1927)
Medals
Men's baseball
Representing United States
Inter-Allied Games
Gold medal – first place	1919 Paris	Team

William Earl Marriott (August 18, 1893 – August 11, 1969) was an American professional baseball third baseman. He played in Major League Baseball (MLB) for the Chicago Cubs, Boston Braves and Brooklyn Robins over six seasons from 1917 to 1927. He also played for the United States national baseball team, composed of active servicemen, at the 1919 Inter-Allied Games held in Paris in the aftermath of the First World War.
