= Barracudas de Montpellier =

French baseball team

The Barracudas de Montpellier are a French professional baseball team in French Division 1 Baseball Championship based in Montpellier, Hérault. They were founded in 1985, and began play in the top French division in 1991. The team plays its home games at Veyrassi Sports Complex, specifically in the Greg Hamilton Baseball Park, named after their most successful coach, on the northern edge of the city of Montpellier.

== History ==
The Barracudas started in 1985, as one of three baseball teams in Montpellier. Two of these teams merged in 1988 to form the current incarnation of the Barracudas. In 1991, the team gained entry to the French Division 1 Baseball Championship, the top level baseball league in France.

The team quickly settled into the new league under the guidance of Greg Hamilton, who served as head coach and general manager of the team from 1993 to 1998. Hamilton led the team to three consecutive league titles from 1993 to 1995, and a third-place finish in the European Champions Cup in 1994. In recognition of Hamilton's contributions to the team, they named their stadium after him in 2012.

These years would also see the first cross-over star for the Barracudas. Canadian pitcher Jeff Zimmerman played with the Barracudas for the 1994. Five years later, in 1999, the righthander was selected for the American League All-Star team as rookie for the Texas Rangers. He would play three seasons in the MLB with the Rangers.

Following the departure of Greg Hamilton, the club had nine different managers from 1998 to 2008. In 2009, Jean Michel Mayeur took over the helm and for three seasons was player/coach before becoming the full-time manager in 2012. Mayeur would remain manager through the 2022 season. In early 2010, local product Anthony Cros would become at the time, just the third French player to sign with a pro club in North America. The power-hitting righty spent 2010 with the Quebec Capitales before returning to the Barracudas the following season. Cros' number 55 is one of five numbers retired by the club to this date. In 2011 and 2015, the Barracudas lost to the Rouen Huskies in the French Series. In 2018, Montpellier pitcher Yoan Antonac, who came up through the Montpellier youth teams and academy, was the first player from the club to be signed by an MLB franchise. Antonac spent parts of three seasons in the Phillies system before returning to Montpellier in 2022.

In 2019, the club finished in third place in France with a 23–9 record, thanks in large part to Venezuelan ace Kevin Canelon, who finished 11–1 in 110.2 IP, with 125 K and a 0.49 ERA. The annual Challenge de France was held in Montpellier in 2019, where Senart edged Rouen in a thrilling final by the score of 7–5. Following the end of the 2019 season, the club said goodbye to former AAA Venezuelan shortstop Larry Infante. Infante, in his two seasons with Montpellier, batted .389 (63-for-162) with 27 runs scored, 1 HR, and 31 RBI in 44 games played.

After a year without baseball due to COVID-19, the 2021 Barracudas won the Challenge de France, qualifying the club for the 2022 CEB Cup, alongside 2021 French champions Rouen. Kevin Canelon, Erly Casanova and Owen Ozanich anchored the pitching staff, which finished with a league best 2.12 ERA. The Barracudas added power hitting infielder Ariel Soriano mid-way through the season. Youngsters Mathis Nayral and Pierre Doat made their division 1 debuts for the club.

In 2022, the Barracudas rotation, led by Kevin Canelon, Owen Ozanich and Mathis Nayral, led the FFBS in team ERA for a second consecutive year, posting a 2.34 team ERA. Offensively, Ariel Soriano led the charge, batting .338 with 1 HR and 18 RBI in 19 games. The team finished the season with a 12–7 overall record, bowing out in the semi-finals to eventual champion Rouen.

The Barracudas finished the 2023 regular season with one of their best records in France, finishing first in their pool with a 19–5 record. The Barracudas, now coached by Ozanich and Giovanni Luciani, beat the Toulouse Tigers in the semi-finals before meeting the Montigny Cougars in the 2023 French Series. Playing in their first finals since 2015, the Barracudas were led by their pitching staff to a five-game series win. Ben Couvreur, only 16 years old at the time, took home French Series MVP honors, while player/coach Owen Ozanich won the decisive game five at home in Montpellier. Kevin Canelon sealed the win by pitching in relief on back to back days.

The 2024 Barracudas welcomed back foreigners Gosselin, Bustamante and Canelon for another season, along with adding veteran hitter Douglas Rodriguez and Australian utility player Riley Spring. The team took home the annual Challenge de France in May, with Gosselin pitching a complete game in the final against Metz. Brossier, Rodriguez, Zan and Antonac homered during the week long European Cup, which saw victories over Austria (Canelon) and Belgium (Ozanich). The team lost key players Antonac, Sugiura, Monks and Zan in July, before falling in the semi-finals against Savigny. Catcher Kovacs, DH Rodriguez, OF Brossier and P Canelon were named FFBS all-stars!

== European Cup appearances ==
- 1994 Champions Cup (Amsterdam, Netherlands)
- 1995 Champions Cup (Nettuno, Italy)
- 1996 CEB Cup (Zagreb, Croatia)
- 1997 CEB Cup (Montpellier, France)
- 1998 Champions Cup (Karlovac, Croatia)
- 2000 Champions Cup (Nettuno, Italy)
- 2001 CEB Cup (Montpellier, France)
- 2002 Champions Cup (Regensburg, Germany)
- 2005 CEB Cup (Montpellier, France)
- 2007 Champions Cup (Hoofddorp, Netherlands)
- 2011 CEB Cup (Montpellier, France)
- 2016 CEB Cup (Rouen, France)
- 2022 CEB Cup (Rouen, France)
- 2024 European Cup (Valencia, Spain)
- 2025 European Cup (Rouen, France)

== Retired numbers ==
- 2 James Schwedhelm
- 12 Lahcene Benhamida
- 42 Laurent Cassier
- 55 Anthony Cros
- 58 Frederic Raynaud

== 2025 ==
Under new general manager Anthony Cros (son of club president Gerard Cros) the team looked to bounce back after being bounced in the 2024 semi-finals at the hands of the Savigny Lions. Cros named Tim Smith the new Barracudas manager, replacing Owen Ozanich, who in two seasons as manager led the club to a 49-29 overall record (.628 win pct), winning the 2023 French Series and 2024 Challenge de France. In their first season under new manager Tim Smith, les Barracudas finished the 2025 regular season in first place with a 20-8 regular season record, before falling in the French Series to the 19-time French champs, Rouen Huskies. The club also lost in the finals of June's European Cup and in the semis of the annual Challenge de France.

SCHEDULE & RESULTS

Regular Season Record: 20-8 (1st place)

Challenge de France Record: 2-2

European Cup Record: 3-1

Playoffs Record: 3-3

Overall Record: 28-14 (.666 win pct)

== 2024 ==
After winning the 2023 championship, the 2024 edition of the Montpellier Barracudas were hungry for more. The club welcomed back foreign pitchers Daniel Gosselin and Kevin Canelon, along with shortstop Oscar Bustamante. Australian infielder Riley Spring split the season between thirdbase, shortstop and second base. After getting off to a slow start in April, the Barracudas came together in May, winning the Challenge de France, qualifying for a 2025 European Cup. Daniel Gosselin pitched a complete game for the win in the final against Metz.

In June, the Barracudas drove south to Valencia, Spain to compete in the 2024 European Cup. The club added key French contributors Julien Monks, Mael Zan and Luc Polit. After winning their first two games against Austria and Belgium behind solid outings from Canelon and Ozanich, the French club fell to Valencia (twice) and Tenerife, finishing 2–3 in the tournament.

Despite several key injuries to pitchers Ben Couvreur, Kenjiro Sugiura and Ismail Pontiac, the Barracudas qualified for the 2024 playoffs. Prior to the start of the semi-finals, longtime two way player Yoan Antonac announced his retirement, dealing the club yet another blow. Veteran Douglas Rodriguez claimed the league batting title, finishing the regular season with a .406 batting average.

In the semi-finals, the club dropped the first two games in Montpellier, before winning game 3 in Savigny. The following day, Savigny managed to pull off a 5–4 win, ending the Barracudas hopes of repeating as French champions.

Outfielder Clement Lepichon announced his retirement shortly after the end of the 2024 season after playing for the club since 2013.

== 2023 ==
The 2023 season was a memorable one for many reasons. In mid May, longtime manager Jean Michel Mayeur stepped down after leading the team to an 8–2 start to the regular season. He handed over managing duties to Owen Ozanich and Giovanni Luciani. The following week, the Barracudas would fall in the semi-final of the annual Challenge de France against Rouen. The club would take off in the second half of the season, going on a ten-game winning streak, finishing the regular season with a league best 19–5 record. Second baseman Dorian Bouniol (.337) and outfielder Paolo Brossier (.331) led the charge offensively. The Barracudas led the FFBS division 1 with a .283 collective team batting average. On the mound, a trio of lefties made the majority of the starts. Kevin Canelon (1.34 ERA), Daniel Gosselin (1.64 ERA) and Ben Couvreur (2.69 ERA) helped lead the Barracudas to a collective 2.09 regular season team ERA.

In late August, the Barracudas opened their title run against Toulouse in the semi-finals. Toulouse took game 1 by the final score of 12–3, before Montpellier bounced back the following day, winning 4–2. The Barracudas were led by a Brossier homer and complete game effort by Daniel Gosselin. With the series back in Montpellier and tied at one, manager Ozanich gave the ball to Gosselin again in game 3, the lefty pitched yet another complete game, propelling Montpellier to a key 4–1 victory. The following day, youngster Ben Couvreur pitched seven strong innings before Kevin Canelon closed the door, pitching the final two frames in an 8–1 win. The Barracudas were onto the French Series!

Montpellier travelled north to the Parisian suburbs for games 1 and 2 of the 2023 French Series. In game 1, Couvreur stepped up yet again, pitching 5.2 scoreless innings, striking out 8 Cougar batters, leading Montpellier to a 4–3 win. Steve Anderson contributed three big hits at the plate. In game 2, Montigny bounced back, taking the contest by a final score of 3–2, sending the series back to Montpellier tied one game apiece.

On Saturday, September 16, the two club locked horns in a pitchers duel, with Montpellier coming away with a 1–0 win in a tenth inning walk-off in front of the home fans! The following day, up two games to one, Montigny shocked Montpellier, beating Gosselin for a second time in the French Series to even up the series at two games each. In the deciding game 5, manager Owen Ozanich started for the home club, which scored three first inning runs in support of their player-coach. Ozanich and Canelon did the rest, blanking the Cougars 8–0, leading Montpellier to their first title since 1995! Ben Couvreur, at only 16 years of age, was awarded French Series MVP!

Following the end of the season, American first baseman Steve Anderson announced his retirement after two memorable seasons with the club.

source: barracudas-baseball.com

== 2022 ==
Playing without Cuban ace Erly Casanova proved to be more difficult than expected for the 2022 version of the Barracudas. Kevin Canelon, Mathis Nayral and Owen Ozanich anchored the Barracudas pitching staff, which again led the French D1 in ERA despite the absence of Casanova. Infielder Ariel Soriano returned for a second season with the club. Power hitting first baseman Steve Anderson stepped in at first base to bat alongside Soriano in the heart of the lineup. Japanese two-way Kenjiro Sugiura was a useful two-way for Mayeur.

While Casanova departed, Mayeur's French talent returned in 2022. Two-way player Ismail Pontiac, outfielder Paolo Brossier, catchers Fabien Kovacs and Pierre Doat all produced solid seasons. Mathis Nayral, who made his French national team debut in 2021, emerged as a key arm on the mound. Veterans Clement Le Pichon and Mathis Guiraud also contributed in starting nine. Mael Zan was productive when in the lineup.

Former Phillies minor league pitcher Yoan Antonac came back to France and joined the club. While limited on the mound due to an apparent arm injury, the big righty contributed at first base and at the plate, even launching a home run in June's Confederations Cup against Tenerife. Montpellier bowed out to perennial powerhouse Rouen in the semi-finals.

Montpellier sent the most players of any club team to the September 2022 World Baseball Classic Qualifiers in Germany. Owen Ozanich, Kenjiro Sugiura, Kevin Canelon, Ariel Soriano, Fabian Kovacs and Paolo Brossier made the trip.

== 2021 ==
After finishing third in the 2019 campaign, the 2020 version of the Barracudas hoped to reach the French Series however they, along with all the other clubs in France were forced to wait, as the 2020 season was cancelled due to COVID-19.

The club has made some significant additions to the roster. In late 2019, Montpellier announced the signing of pitcher Owen Ozanich. In early 2021, the Barracudas signed Cuban workhorse Erly Casanova.

Canelon (7–3, 1.75 ERA), Cuban righty Erly Casanova (7–1, 2.25 ERA) and Ozanich (4–2, 0.86 ERA) anchored the rotation.

Two Americans, Patrick Cromwell (.280/.430/.404) and Andy Cosgrove (.266/.406/.405) joined the club, Cromwell played infield at Clemson University while Cosgrove arrived after stints at NC State and in the minor leagues (Twins organization).

Nine Barracudas returned from US college seasons. Fabien Kovacs, Mael Zan, Julien Monks, Luc Polit, Nolan Soliveres, Nicolas Khoury, Ismail Pontiac, Fred Walter and Paolo Brossier all played in the states in early 2021 and came back in the south of France to solidify manager Jean Michel Mayeur's team.

The Barracudas finished the regular season 17–3, second in their pool behind Senart.

In September 2021 Montpellier went 4–0 in the annual Challenge de France, taking home the club's first title since 2006. Montpellier's pitching staff led the tournament in ERA and strikeouts. Mathis Nayral, Owen Ozanich, Erly Casanova and Kevin Canelon each won a game. Canelon took home tournament MVP honors. Paolo Brossier, Ariel Soriano and Clement Le Pichon homered in a 15–1 win over Rouen in the final. The Barracudas earned a spot in the 2022 CEB European Cup.

The defending French champions, Rouen Huskies, knocked the 2021 Barracudas out of the playoffs in the semi-finals; taking the best-of-five series three games to one.

== Current roster ==
PITCHERS

Anderson Vera (VEN)

Yoilan Quinonez (VEN)

Ben Couvreur

Owen Ozanich

Luc Polit

Laurent Andrades

CATCHERS

Fabi Kovacs

Pierre Doat

INFIELDERS

Douglas Rodriguez (VEN)

Isma Pontiac

Dorian Bouniol

Antoni Flores (VEN)

Mathis Guiraud

Julien Monks

OUTFIELDERS

Paolo Brossier

Greg Cros

Andy Pitcher

Mael Zan
