= Irish Baseball League =

Baseball competition in Ireland

- Sport: Baseball
- Founded: 1997
- President: Seán Mitchell
- No. of teams: 16
- Country: Ireland
- Continent: Europe
- Most recent champion: Mariners Baseball
- Most titles: Dublin Spartans (12)
- Website: www.baseballireland.com

The Irish Baseball League (IBL) is the men's league in Ireland. It started play in 1997. The season runs from March to October and are played on the weekends.

== Club sides and fields ==
The O'Malley Fields at Corkagh Park in Clondalkin, West Dublin are the main home of Irish Baseball and current home field for the Dublin City Hurricanes and the Dublin Spartans. The Greystones Mariners play at Shanganagh Park in Shankill, County Dublin. The Ashbourne Baseball Club plays at the International Baseball Centre in Ashbourne, County Meath. The Belfast Northstars and the Ulster Buccaneers currently play at Hydebank. Comets play at the Peace Link in Clones, County Monaghan. The Cork Renegades play at Brian Dillons GAA Montenotte, Cork. Portmarnock Red Rox play at the Red Rox Baseball Field

As of the 2025 season, the following teams were participating at the associated venues:

Club	Location	Stadium	Titles
Belfast Northstars	Belfast	Hydebank Playing Fields	1
Ulster Buccaneers	Belfast	Hydebank Playing Fields	-
Comets Baseball	Clones	The Peace Link	-
Cork Renegades	Cork	Brian Dillons GAA	1
Dublin City Hurricanes	Dublin (Clondalkin)	Corkagh Park	7
Dublin Spartans	Dublin (Clondalkin)	Corkagh Park	12
Mariners Baseball	Shankill	Shanganagh Park	5
Ashbourne Baseball Club	Ashbourne	International Baseball Centre	1
Portmarnock Red Rox	Portmarnock	Red Rox Baseball Field	-

A Division	B Division
Ashbourne Giants	Ashbourne Giants B
Dublin Hurricanes	Ashbourne Stags
Dublin Spartans	Belfast Buccaneers
Irish Baseball Academy U18	Belfast Northstars
Mariners Baseball	Cork Renegades
Red Rox	Dublin Hurricanes B
	Dublin Spartans B
	Mariners Baseball B
	Mariners Vikings

== Irish A League history ==
Irish League Champions (1997–present)

- 2024 – Mariners Baseball
- 2023 – Mariners Baseball
- 2022 – Ashbourne Giants
- 2021 – Mariners Baseball
- 2020 – Mariners Baseball
- 2019 – Dublin City Hurricanes
- 2018 – Dublin City Hurricanes
- 2017 – Dublin City Hurricanes
- 2016 – Dublin City Hurricanes
- 2015 – Dublin City Hurricanes
- 2014 – Mariners Baseball
- 2013 – Spartans
- 2012 – Spartans
- 2011 – Spartans
- 2010 – Spartans
- 2009 – Spartans
- 2008 – Spartans
- 2007 – Spartans
- 2006 – Spartans
- 2005 – Dublin City Hurricanes
- 2004 – Spartans
- 2003 – Dublin City Hurricanes
- 2002 – Spartans
- 2001 – Panthers
- 2000 – Spartans
- 1999 – Spartans
- 1998 – Panthers
- 1997 – Panthers

== See also ==
- Baseball in Ireland
- Baseball awards § Ireland
- Baseball awards § Europe
