= Joris Bert =

French baseball player (born 1987)

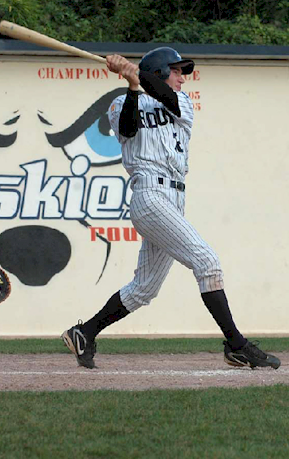
- Joris Bert - Crédit : FFBS

Rouen Baseball 76
- Center Field
- Born: 16 May 1987 (age 39); Louviers, France
- Bats: Left Throws: Left
- Stats at Baseball Reference

Joris Bert (born 16 May 1987), is a French baseball player for Rouen Baseball 76 of Division Élite. He bats left and throws left. He is nicknamed "Frenchie" by his teammates.

== Biography ==
He started playing baseball as a child when he arrived late to a soccer practice one day. He noticed some children playing baseball in the next field, and went to join them; he enjoyed the game and has been interested in the sport ever since then.

Educated in Louviers, and then at the Institut national du sport et de l'éducation physique (INSEP), Joris played on the field as both a pitcher and an outfielder. Arriving in Rouen after having improved his game with the Woodchucks de Bois-Guillaume of the Division Élite, he won the 2006 French baseball championship while playing for the Rouen Baseball 76. In July 2006, he was the second runner up for the Europe Espoir prize while playing with the French national team.

A quick runner with a strong arm, he moved to Texas in January 2007 to play ball for Frank Phillips College of the NJCAA. He led his team with in RBIs and stolen bases (42 in 49 games). Major League Baseball recruiters became interested in him during the 2007 MLB draft, and on 8 June 2007, he became the first French baseball player in history to be drafted by a Major League Baseball franchise. He was selected during the 19th round (596th overall) of the 2007 player draft by the Los Angeles Dodgers.

From 12 to 16 June 2007, the played in the European Baseball Cup in Saint Marin with Rouen, winning the second place European Championship.

His minor-league debut was on 27 July 2007 with the Gulf Coast League. During this first game as a GCL Dodger, he scored one run against the GCL Marlins.

As a member of the French national baseball team, he was selected to play in the Beijing tournament from 15 to 24 August 2007; he also played in the European Championship from 5 to 16 September 2007.

He was recruited with a starting bonus of 25,000 euros, and now makes a monthly salary of 800 euros.

Joris had visa problems upon arrival in the US, but was able to play in the Gulf Coast League. He quickly adapted to the new culture; he speaks fluent Spanish, and integrated well with his international teammates. A 2008 New York Times article said that the Dodgers expect action from him, and that he was rapidly learning the finer points of hitting, though his parents had not come to see him play in the US; "They don't understand," he said.

Bert was released during the 2009 season, after which he returned to Rouen. He made 26 appearances in 2024, slashing .275/.388/.426 while stealing 10 bases.

== Sources ==
This article draws heavily on the fr:Joris Bert article in the French-language Wikipedia, which was accessed in the version of September 5, 2008.

Sources quoted here are also quoted in the French Wikipedia article of the same name.
