= Jeff Zimmerman =

Canadian baseball player (born 1972)

- Pitcher
- Born: August 9, 1972 (age 53); Kelowna, British Columbia, Canada
- Batted: Right Threw: Right

MLB debut
- April 13, 1999, for the Texas Rangers

Last MLB appearance
- October 7, 2001, for the Texas Rangers

MLB statistics
- Win–loss record: 17–12
- Earned run average: 3.27
- Strikeouts: 92
- Saves: 32
- Stats at Baseball Reference

Teams
- Texas Rangers (1999–2001)

Career highlights and awards
- All-Star (1999)

Jeffrey Ross Zimmerman (born August 9, 1972) is a Canadian former professional baseball pitcher. He pitched in Major League Baseball from 1999 to 2001 for the Texas Rangers.

== Baseball career ==
=== Independent baseball ===
Zimmerman played baseball in the French Elite League for one season with the Barracudas de Montpellier. In 1996, he pitched for the Canadian national baseball team; they failed to qualify for the Olympics. After taking some time off from baseball to earn his Master of Business Administration degree at Simon Fraser University, he played with the independent Northern League's Winnipeg Goldeyes in 1997.

=== Texas Rangers ===
Zimmerman was purchased from Winnipeg by the Texas Rangers in 1998 and played at both the A and AA minor league levels. In 1999, he made his way onto the Rangers Major League squad after a short stint at the AAA minor league level. He became a very successful middle relief pitcher in the bullpen and even became an All-Star that season (his only All-Star appearance). Zimmerman tied the record for most consecutive winning decisions to start a career with nine wins. In 2001, he became the Rangers' closer and amassed 28 saves in a season that culminated in the Rangers naming him the club's Pitcher of the Year. Over the three years from 1999 through 2001, he totaled 17 wins, 32 saves, and a 3.27 ERA in 228 2/3 IP in 196 games.

In the 2001 offseason, the Rangers signed Zimmerman to a three-year contract worth over $10 million. Before the start of the season, Zimmerman suffered a series of injuries that prevented him from throwing another pitch in MLB beginning with a spring training injury and continuing through three major surgeries on his elbow, including two Tommy John surgeries. He did pitch in a handful of minor league and Arizona League games, but never close to a full season and never at the major league level. Following the end of this contract, which covered 2002 through 2004, the Rangers reinvested in Zimmerman with a minor league contract for the 2005 season. Again Zimmerman suffered injuries that prevented his return to the field of play for the course of the entire season.

Zimmerman elected to take the 2006 season off in hopes that his arm would naturally heal over the course of the season. T. R. Sullivan, the Rangers' beat writer on MLB.com, called this decision "his last, best hope" for returning to playing baseball. Having not competed in a game since 2003, Zimmerman retired in 2006 and moved back to Vancouver, British Columbia. In 2008, The Sports Network listed Zimmerman as retired and gives his career potential as, "After four years out with injuries, he may be done."

On January 18, 2006 Lone Star Ball, a Texas Rangers blog, named Zimmerman 46 on "The 50 Greatest Rangers of All Time" list.

=== Seattle Mariners ===
On April 7, 2009, Zimmerman came out of retirement, signing a minor league deal with the Seattle Mariners. He spent the first several weeks of the season in extended spring training.

Zimmerman, who had been plagued with injuries for most of his career, said this about his baseball abilities after sitting out for so long:

Right away I was able to throw a baseball without any discomfort at all, I sometimes find it hard to believe that after all that time, I was completely healthy again. I threw the ball in January and I had no trouble getting it into the high eighties.

Zimmerman appeared in one game for the Arizona League Mariners, pitching two innings and giving up one run. It was his last appearance in professional baseball.

== Personal ==
Zimmerman was born in Kelowna, British Columbia. He attended Texas Christian University. Jeff's brother, Jordan Zimmerman, also played in the major leagues as a pitcher for the Seattle Mariners. Jeff pitched in a game against his brother on July 2, 1999.

== See also ==
- List of Major League Baseball players from Canada
