= Alexandre Roy =

Canadian politician and farmer

Alexandre Roy (January 14, 1738 – October 28, 1813) was a farmer and political figure in Lower Canada. He represented Cornwallis in the Legislative Assembly of Lower Canada from 1804 to 1808.

He was born in Kamouraska, the son of Pierre Roy dit Desjardins and Marie-Anne Bouchard. In 1763, he married Josephte Plourde. Roy served as a captain in the militia during the War of 1812. He did not run for reelection to the assembly in 1808. Roy died in Kamouraska at the age of 75.
