= International Baseball Centre =

Sports facility in Ireland

Coordinates: 53.50279°N 6.38634°W

The International Baseball Centre (IBC) is the home field of the Ashbourne Baseball Club and the Irish National Baseball Team. It opened in 2015. It is Ireland's only international standard baseball diamond.

The IBC is the host field for the International Baseball Festival, an annual international baseball tournament held in Ashbourne.

The IBC has been the host field for two European Baseball Championship Qualifier tournaments.

The first tournament was the 2019 European Baseball Championship - Qualification held in Ireland in 2018. In 2023, it hosted a U18 European Baseball Championship Qualifier.

In 2024, the field will host another European Baseball Championship Qualifier.

== International Baseball Festival ==
The International Baseball Festival is an annual baseball tournament held at the International Baseball Centre. The first tournament was held in 2015. The Irish National Baseball Team has competed in every tournament since inception in preparation for International Play. Past competing teams have come from Belgium, Mexico, the Netherlands, Spain, Venezuela and the USA.

Year	Dates	Competitors in International Baseball Festival	Winner
2015	August 19th-23rd	Irish National Baseball Team and teams from Belgium, Mexico, the USA and Venezuela	Mexico
2016	July 7th-10th	Irish National Baseball Team, teams from USA and Venezuela, and an "All Star" team (the President's 9) from the Irish Baseball League	Team USA
2017	July 4th-9th	Irish National Baseball Team, teams from Belgium, the Netherlands, Spain and USA, and an "All Star" team (President's 9) from Irish Baseball League	President's 9
2018	July 12th-15th	Irish National Baseball Team, an AAU team from the USAA, and an "All Star" team (President's 9) from Irish Baseball League	Irish National Team
2019	July 18th-21st	Irish National Baseball Team, Ulster Red Sox and an "All Star" team (President's 9) from Irish Baseball League	President's 9
2020	Not held (COVID 19 pandemic)		
2021	Not held (COVID 19 pandemic)		
2022	July 7th-10th	Irish National Baseball Team hosted teams from USA and Europe	Sevilla Texas Lions

== 2019 European Baseball Championship Qualifications ==
The International Baseball Centre was the host field for a C-Pool qualification tournament for the 2019 European Baseball Championships. Tournament dates were July 23rd - 29th, 2018. National teams competing included Greece, Slovenia, Finland and Norway. The Irish National Team won the gold medal and advanced to the next round of Olympic qualifying.
