= Baseball Ireland =

Irish Baseball and Softball Federation
- Sport: Baseball and softball
- Jurisdiction: Republic of Ireland; Northern Ireland
- Founded: 1989
- Affiliation: WBSC
- Regional affiliation: WBSC Europe
- Headquarters: Cabinteely, Ireland
- President: Sean Mitchell (as of 2022)

Official website
- baseballireland.ie
- (Republic of Ireland)
- (Northern Ireland)

The Irish Baseball and Softball Federation, also known as Baseball Ireland, is the governing body of baseball and softball on the island of Ireland, covering both Northern Ireland and the Republic of Ireland.

Baseball Ireland is responsible for the national baseball team and overseeing the Irish Baseball League.

== History ==
Baseball Ireland was founded in 1989 with the aim to develop and further the growth of baseball and softball in Ireland. Organised baseball has been played in Ireland since the late 1990s. During 1995 and 1996, visiting coaches from Major League Baseball provided instruction to senior players and contributed to the establishment of the first Irish national senior team, which participated in the 1996 European Championships held in Hull, England.

== Teams ==
Baseball Ireland oversees the development of the following national baseball teams:

- Ireland's national baseball team
- Ireland national under-18 baseball team
- Ireland national under-15 baseball team
