= Ashbourne Baseball Club =

Sporting organisation in Ireland

The Ashbourne Baseball Club is Ireland's largest baseball club. It is located in Ashbourne, County Meath, and draws players from the surrounding area, including Dublin. The club was created in 2009 as the Garristown Gruffalos. The club competes in the Irish Baseball League and plays in the International Baseball Centre.

== History ==
The Ashbourne Baseball Club was formed as a Little League team (“Garristown Gruffalos") in 2009. In 2012, the club relocated to Ashbourne, County Meath to become the Ashbourne Giants.

In 2024, the Ashbourne Titans and Ashbourne Giants were merged.

== Baseball divisions ==
"Coach Pitch" is the club's youngest age group, for kids under 10. The Little League program is for kids aged 9–12. Players aged 12-15 participate in the club's "Cadet Baseball" program.

The club has two teams in the B division of the Irish Baseball League, the Ashbourne Titans and Ashbourne Stags. The Ashbourne Titans are focused on youth development. The "Ashbourne Stags" team is the home of adult players of all abilities and experience levels. The "Ashbourne Giants A" division team is made up of the best players in the club and competes at the highest levels in the Irish Baseball League.

== Facilities ==
The International Baseball Centre (IBC) is the home field of the Ashbourne Baseball Club. It opened in 2015. The IBC is also the host field for the International Baseball Festival, an annual international baseball tournament held in Ashbourne.

The IBC was the host field for the 2019 European Baseball Championship - Qualification, which was held in Ireland in 2018. The field also hosted a U18 European Baseball Championship Qualifier in 2023, and is due to host a European Baseball Championship Qualifier in 2024.

== Championships ==
- Baseball Ireland Little League Champions (3): 2015, 2016, 2017
- Baseball Ireland Cadet League Champions (1): 2021
- Baseball Ireland B Division Regular Season Champions (1): 2017
- Baseball Ireland B Division Champions (2): 2017, 2020
- Baseball Ireland A Division Regular Season Champions(1) 2021
- Baseball Ireland Cadet Division Champions 2021 (played as Warriors with Dublin City Hurricanes)
- Baseball Ireland A Division Champions (1): 2022
