= Ireland national baseball team =

Information
- Country: Ireland; Northern Ireland
- Federation: Baseball Ireland
- Confederation: WBSC Europe
- Manager: Steve Kline

WBSC ranking
- Current: 69 (26 October 2026)

Olympic Games
- Appearances: 0

World Baseball Classic
- Appearances: 0

World Cup
- Appearances: 0

Intercontinental Cup
- Appearances: 0

European Championship
- Appearances: 12 (first in 1996)
- Best result: 1st in Pool C, 2018

The Ireland national baseball team has been in existence since 1996 and has taken part in several major baseball tournaments and tours. As in many other sports in Ireland, the team represents both the Republic of Ireland and Northern Ireland.

== History ==
The Ireland national baseball team has participated in the following tournaments:

- 1996 – European Pool B Championships – Hull, United Kingdom
- 1998 – European Pool B Championships – Vienna and Stockerau, Austria
- 2000 – European Pool B Championships – Karlovac, Croatia
- 2001 – Team tour of New England, United States
- 2002 – European Pool B Championships – Stockholm, Sweden
- 2004 – European Pool B Championships – Regensberg, Germany
- 2005 – Team tour of Orange County area in Los Angeles, United States
- 2006 – European Pool B Championships – Antwerp, Belgium
- 2008 – European Pool B Championships – Abrantes, Portugal
- 2010 – Team tour of New England, United States
- 2014 – European Pool C Championships – Ljubljana, Slovenia
- 2016 – European Pool C Championships – Ljubljana, Slovenia
- 2018 – European Pool C Championships – Ashbourne, County Meath, Ireland
- 2019 – European Pool B Championships – Blagoevgrad, Bulgaria
- 2022 – European Pool B Championships – Blagoevgrad, Bulgaria
- 2024 – European Pool B Championships – Ashbourne, County Meath, Ireland
- 2026 - European Pool B Championships – Wrocław, Poland

Ireland won the C pool in 2018, advancing to the B pool of competition in 2019. In 2024, Ireland made the final of the B pool qualifiers, which were again hosted in Ireland, eventually losing to Austria.

== Roster ==
Ireland's roster for the 2026 Season

Name	Club
James Bentley	(Republic of Ireland) Ashbourne
Seamus Brown	(United States) Saint Martin Saints
David Casey	(Republic of Ireland) Ashbourne
Matthew Dutton	(United States) Dean College Bulldogs
Trajan Finarelli	(United States) Metro Senators
Brendan Flaherty	(United States) Caltech Beavers
Cian Fowler	(United States) Fisher College Falcons
Fionn Gallahar-Hall	(Republic of Ireland) Ashbourne
Alex Lucas Turczyn	(Republic of Ireland) Red Rox Baseball
Leo Lyons	(United States) St. John's Red Storm
Sean McAdams	(United States) Mercy Mavericks
Patrick Mitchell	(Republic of Ireland) Ashbourne
Ryan O'Rourke	(United States) Irish Wolfhounds
Trevor Peacock	(Republic of Ireland) Dublin Spartans
Noah Pinto	(Republic of Ireland) Ashbourne
Aljo Sujak	(Italy) Big Mat Grosseto
Isaiah Smith	(United States) Ithaca Bombers
Keelan Smithers	(United States) Irish Wolfhounds
Joshua Suda	(Republic of Ireland) Dublin City Hurricanes
Colin Walsh	Without Club

== See also ==
- Baseball in Ireland
