= French Division 1 Baseball Championship =

French baseball league

- Sport: Baseball
- Founded: 1926
- No. of teams: 8
- Country: France
- Most recent champion: Rouen Huskies
- Most titles: Paris Université Club (22)
- Website: https://ffbs.fr/ (French)

The Division Élite is the highest level of Baseball in France. Its clubs compete for the Championnat de France de baseball.

== Organization ==
The French D1 begins play on March 23, 2025. An eight-team league plays a 28-game schedule on weekends, with the season running from thru early October. The top 4 teams qualify for semifinals. Semi-finals and finals are also played in best-of-five series. The league follows a promotion and relegation system where the last of the regular season goes down to the Division 2 while the D2 winner automatically moves up to D1. In 2025, Beziers will play their first season in Division 1 after winning the D2 in 2024. The annual Challenge de France typically takes place every May, with the 2025 edition to be held in Metz. Two French clubs, Rouen and Montpellier will participate in the 2025 European Cup, to be hosted in June in Rouen. The 2025 French Series will take place in October, following the conclusion of the 2025 European Baseball championships (held in Rotterdam).

== Current teams ==
Team	City
Pirates de Beziers	Beziers, France
Barracudas de Montpellier	Montpellier, France
Metz Cometz	Metz, France
Huskies de Rouen	Rouen, France
Lions de Savigny-sur-Orge	Savigny-sur-Orge, France
Templiers de Sénart	Senart, France
Tigers de Toulouse	Toulouse, France
La Rochelle Boucaniers	La Rochelle, France

== Champions ==
The Division Élite was created in 1926. Not all editions were held and some results are missing.

Year	Champion	Runner-up
1954	Stade Français	Paris Université Club
1955	Paris Université Club	Stade Français
1963	BC Paris	BC Charenton
1964	BC Charenton	BC Paris
1965	Paris Université Club	Saints de Saint-Germain-en-Laye
1966	Paris Université Club	Saints de Saint-Germain-en-Laye
1967	Pirates de Paris	Paris Université Club
1968	CSF Cagnes-sur-Mer	Paris Université Club
1969	Pirates de Paris	CSF Cagnes-sur-Mer
1970	Paris Université Club	Nice Université Club
1971	Nice Université Club	Paris Université Club
1972	Paris Université Club	St Germain en Laye
1973	Paris Université Club	Nice Université Club
1974	Nice Université Club	Paris Université Club
1975	Paris Université Club	Nice Université Club
1976	Paris Université Club	Nice Université Club
1977	Paris Université Club	Nice Université Club
1978	BC Nippon/Nice Université Club	
1979	Nice Université Club/BC Nippon	
1980	Paris Université Club	Nice Université Club
1981	Nice Université Club	Paris Université Club
1982	Paris Université Club	BCF Paris
1983	Paris Université Club	Meyzieu
1984	Paris Université Club	Nice Université Club
1985	Paris Université Club	Limeil-Brévannes
1986	Paris Université Club	BCF Paris
1987	Paris Université Club	BCF Paris
1988	Paris Université Club	Lions de Savigny-sur-Orge
1989	Paris Université Club	Pineuilh
1990	Paris Université Club	Lions de Savigny-sur-Orge
1991	Paris Université Club	BCF Paris
1992	Paris Université Club	Limeil-Brévannes
1993	Barracudas de Montpellier	Paris Université Club
1994	Barracudas de Montpellier	Paris Université Club
1995	Barracudas de Montpellier	Jimmer's de Saint-Lô
1996	Jimmer's de Saint-Lô	Barracudas de Montpellier
1997	Jimmer's de Saint-Lô	Barracudas de Montpellier
1998	Lions de Savigny-sur-Orge	Barracudas de Montpellier
1999	Lions de Savigny-sur-Orge	Barracudas de Montpellier
2000	Paris Université Club	Barracudas de Montpellier
2001	Lions de Savigny-sur-Orge	Barracudas de Montpellier
2002	Lions de Savigny-sur-Orge	Barracudas de Montpellier
2003	Rouen Baseball 76	Lions de Savigny-sur-Orge
2004	Lions de Savigny-sur-Orge	Barracudas de Montpellier
2005	Rouen Baseball 76	Lions de Savigny-sur-Orge
2006	Rouen Baseball 76	Tigers de Toulouse
2007	Rouen Huskies	Templiers de Sénart
2008	Rouen Huskies	Templiers de Sénart
2009	Rouen Huskies	Lions de Savigny-sur-Orge
2010	Rouen Huskies	Lions de Savigny-sur-Orge
2011	Rouen Huskies	Barracudas de Montpellier
2012	Rouen Huskies	Templiers de Sénart
2013	Rouen Huskies	Templiers de Sénart
2014	Templiers de Sénart	Paris Université Club
2015	Huskies de Rouen	Barracudas de Montpellier
2016	Huskies de Rouen	Templiers de Sénart
2017	Huskies de Rouen	Templiers de Sénart
2018	Huskies de Rouen	Cougars de Montigny
2019	Huskies de Rouen	Templiers de Sénart
2021	Huskies de Rouen	Templiers de Sénart
2022	Huskies de Rouen	Lions de Savigny-sur-Orge
2023	Barracudas de Montpellier	Cougars de Montigny
2024	Rouen Baseball 76	Lions de Savigny-sur-Orge
2025	Rouen Huskies	Montpellier Barracudas

== See also ==
- Baseball awards#France
- Baseball awards#Europe
