= 2010 Hiroshima Toyo Carp season =

2010 Hiroshima Toyo Carp
- League: Central League
- Ballpark: Mazda Stadium
- City: Hiroshima
- Owner: Hajime Matsuda
- Manager: Kenjiro Nomura

The 2010 Hiroshima Toyo Carp season features the Hiroshima-based professional baseball team quest to win their first Central League title since 1991. Kenjiro Nomura, one of its legend, was introduced as their new manager at the end of last season, who pledge to bring the league title to Hiroshima this season.

This article lists its official game at 2010 season.

== Pre-season ==
=== Standings ===
2010 NPB Pre-season	G	W	L	T	Win%
Hokkaido Nippon-Ham Fighters	12	8	3	1	.727
Fukuoka SoftBank Hawks	13	7	4	2	.636
Tohoku Rakuten Eagles	9	5	3	1	.625
Yomiuri Giants	16	9	6	1	.600
Orix Buffaloes	10	5	4	1	.556
Hiroshima Carp	15	8	7	0	.533
Saitama Seibu Lions	11	5	6	0	.455
Chunichi Dragons	19	7	9	3	.438
Tokyo Yakult Swallows	16	6	8	2	.429
Chiba Lotte Marines	13	5	7	1	.417
Hanshin Tigers	15	6	9	0	.400
Yokohama BayStars	15	4	9	2	.308

=== Game log ===
2010 Pre-season
Game Log

#	Date	Opponent	Score	Win	Loss	Save	Attendance	Record
1	26 Feb	@ Hawks	1–6	Houlton (1–0)	Shinoda (0–1)		22,713	0–1–0
2	27 Feb	@ Hawks	1–2	Mahara (1–0)	Kishimoto (0–1)		22,490	0–2–0
3	2 Mar	@ Dragons	3–0	Alvarado (1–0)	Kongoh (0–1)	Ueno (1)	9,054	1–2–0
4	4 Mar	Lions	7–5	Umetsu (1–0)	Y. Tanaka (0–1)	Kishimoto (1)	8,261	2–2–0
5	6 Mar	Marines	3–1	Alvarado (2–0)	Naruse (0–2)	T. Aoki (1)	11,224	3–2–0
6	7 Mar	Marines	9x-8	Kishimoto (1–1)	Uchi (0–1)		6,190	4–2–0
7	10 Mar	@ Eagles	4–5 (8)	Arime (1–0)	K. Nagakawa (0–1)		2,076	4–3–0
8	12 Mar	@ Tigers	7–1	T. Aoki (1–0)	Kojima (0–1)		3,802	5–3–0
9	13 Mar	Hawks	9–5	T. Aizawa (1–0)	Sugiuchi (0–1)		5,349	6–3–0
10	14 Mar	SoftBank	6–7	Otonari (1–1)	K. Maeda (0–1)	Kume (2)	18,025	6–4–0
11	16 Mar	@ Marines	2–7	H. Ueno (1–0)	Kishimoto (1–2)		7,389	6–5–0
12	17 Mar	@ Giants	1–6	Fujii (2–0)	Komatsu (0–1)		28,650	6–6–0
13	18 Mar	@ Swallows	4–0	T. Aoki (2–0)	Tateyama (0–1)		4,338	7–6–0
14	20 Mar	@ Tigers	7–0	K. Maeda (1–1)	Ando (0–2)	Alvarado (1)	7,394	8–6–0
15	21 Mar	Tigers	6–10	Nomi (2–1)	Shinoda (0–2)		23,534	8–7–0

== Regular season ==
=== Standings ===
2010 Central League standings
Team	Pld	W	L	T	PCT	GB
Chunichi Dragons	144	79	62	3	.559	—
Hanshin Tigers	144	78	63	3	.552	1
Yomiuri Giants	144	79	64	1	.552	1
Tokyo Yakult Swallows	144	72	68	4	.514	6.5
Hiroshima Carp	144	58	84	2	.410	21.5
Yokohama BayStars	144	48	95	1	.337	32

Source: https://npb.jp/bis/eng/2010/stats/

=== Game log ===
2010 Season (Central League)
March

#	Date	Opponent	Score	Win	Loss	Save	Attendance	Record
1	26 Mar	@ Dragons	3–1	K. Maeda (1–0)	Yoshimi (0–1)	K. Nagakawa (1)	35,980	1–0–0
2	27 Mar	@ Dragons	0–7	Chen (1–0)	Alvarado (0–1)		33,441	1–1–0
3	28 Mar	@ Dragons	7-8x	A. Takahashi (1–0)	K. Nagakawa (0–1)		32,824	1–2–0
4	30 Mar	Tigers	3–6	Nomi (1–0)	T. Aoki (0–1)	Fujikawa (1)	28,074	1–3–0
5	31 Mar	Tigers	4–6	Kubo (1–0)	Saitoh (0–1)	Fujikawa (2)	16,049	1–4–0

April

#	Date	Opponent	Score	Win	Loss	Save	Attendance	Record
6	1 Apr	Tigers	Game postponed due to rain					
7	2 Apr	Giants	4–5	Gonzalez (1–1)	K. Maeda (1–1)	Kroon (3)	17,779	1–5–0
8	3 Apr	Giants	5–6	Kaneto (1–0)	Schultz (0–1)	Kobayashi (1)	28,455	1–6–0
9	4 Apr	Giants	3–10	Tohno (1–1)	Komatsu (0–1)		29,186	1–7–0
10	6 Apr	@ Swallows	3–2	K. Nagakawa (1–1)	Oshimoto (0–1)	Schultz (1)	12,549	2–7–0
11	7 Apr	@ Swallows	1–7	Tateyama (2–0)	Saitoh (0–2)		9,057	2–8–0
12	8 Apr	@ Swallows	4–0	K. Maeda (2–1)	Ishikawa (0–3)	Schultz (2)	12,133	3–8–0
13	9 Apr	@ BayStars	0–5	Miura (1–0)	Alvarado (0–2)		11,372	3–9–0
14	10 Apr	@ BayStars	7–3	Komatsu (1–1)	Kaga (0–3)		19,104	4–9–0
15	11 Apr	@ BayStars	3–6	Shimizu (1–1)	Hasegawa (0–1)		17,801	4–10–0
16	13 Apr	Swallows	3x-2 (10)	K. Takahashi (1–0)	Takagi (0–1)		12,776	5–10–0
17	14 Apr	Swallows	6–3	Saitoh (1–2)	Ishikawa (0–4)	Schultz (3)	12,425	6–10–0
18	15 Apr	Swallows	1–2	Oshimoto (1–1)	Shinoda (0–1)	Lim (4)	12,563	6–11–0
19	16 Apr	Dragons	4x-3	K. Takahashi (2–0)	Asao (0–1)		13,500	7–11–0
20	17 Apr	Dragons	8x-7	K. Takahashi (3–0)	A. Takahashi (3–1)		23,681	8–11–0
21	18 Apr	Dragons	4–2	Yokoyama (1–0)	Nagamine (0–1)	Schultz (4)	25,244	9–11–0
22	20 Apr	@ Tigers	0–5	Shimoyanagi (2–1)	Saitoh (1–3)		38,116	9–12–0
23	21 Apr	@ Tigers	2–1	Maeda (3–1)	Kubo (2–2)	Schultz (5)	38,242	10–12–0
24	22 Apr	@ Tigers	Game postponed due to rain					
25	23 Apr	@ Giants	4–10	Tohno (4–1)	Stults (0–1)		43,847	10–13–0
26	24 Apr	@ Giants	4–7	Ochi (2–0)	Takahashi (3–1)		46,673	10–14–0
27	25 Apr	@ Giants	2–8	Obispo (1–0)	Komatsu (1–2)		43,091	10–15–0
28	27 Apr	BayStars	3–0	Maeda (4–1)	Randolph (0–4)	Schultz (6)	12,210	11–16–0
29	28 Apr	BayStars	1–2	Terahara (3–2)	Saitoh (1–4)	Yamaguchi (7)	15,541	11–17–0
30	29 Apr	BayStars	0–8	Shimizu (3–2)	Stults (0–2)		28,030	11–18–0
31	30 Apr	Dragons	9–0	T. Aoki (1–1)	Ogasawara (1–3)		18,437	12–18–0

May

#	Date	Opponent	Score	Win	Loss	Save	Attendance	Record
32	May. 1	Dragons	6–12	Suzuki (1–0)	Komatsu (1–3)		30,707	12–19–0
33	May. 2	Dragons	4x-3	Takahashi (4–1)	Asao (1–2)		31,821	13–19–0
34	May. 3	@ BayStars	3–1	Maeda (5–1)	Randolph (0–5)	Schultz (7)	24,132	14–19–0
35	May. 4	@ BayStars	5-6x	Yamaguchi (1–3)	Takahashi (4–2)		27,074	14–20–0
36	May. 5	@ BayStars	4–5	Shimizu (4–2)	Stults (0–3)	Yamaguchi (10)	22,620	14–21–0
37	May. 7	@ Tigers	6–10	Kubota (3–1)	Takahashi (4–3)		38,157	14–22–0
38	May. 8	@ Tigers	11–8	Shinoda (1–1)	Kawasaki (0–1)		46,768	15–22–0
39	May. 9	@ Tigers	3–4	Nishimura (4–0)	Maeda (5–2)	Fujikawa (9)	46,703	15–23–0
40	May. 13	Eagles	4–6	Nagai (3–3)	Aoki (1–2)	Kawagishi (7)	13,047	15–24–0
41	May. 14	Eagles	7–8	Inoue (1–0)	Bale (0–1)	Yamamura (1)	25,671	15–25–0
42	May. 15	Fighters	1x-0	Maeda (6–2)	Tanimoto (1–2)		31,842	16–25–0
43	May. 16	Fighters	2–6	M. Takeda (2–4)	Imai (0–1)		30,281	16–26–0
44	May. 18	@ Buffaloes	2–11	Kondo (2–4)	T. Aoki (1–3)		16,368	16–27–0
45	May. 19	@ Buffaloes	8–2	Stults (1–3)	Komatsu (2–2)		16,784	17–27–0
46	May. 21	@ Hawks	7–1	Maeda (7–2)	Otonari (1–6)		33,277	18–27–0
47	May. 22	@ Hawks	4–7	Wada (6–3)	Aizawa (0–1)	Mahara (14)	31,952	18–28–0
48	May. 23	Lions	Game postponed due to rain					
49	May. 24	Lions	3–0	Stults (2–3)	Kishi (7–2)	Yokoyama (1)	20,235	19–28–0
48	May. 25	Lions	7–10	Hsu (3–4)	Kishimoto (0–1)	Sikorski (16)	10,699	19–29–0
50	May. 26	Chiba	1–9	Murphy (3–0)	Takahashi (4–4)		17,089	19–30–0
51	May. 27	Chiba	3–0	Maeda (8–2)	Naruse (6–5)	Yokoyama (2)	19,576	20–30–0
52	May. 29	@ Eagles	2-3x (10)	Koyama (2–1)	K. Nagakawa (1–2)		17,529	20–31–0
53	May. 30	@ Eagles	2–4	Tanaka (7–3)	T. Aoki (1–4)		20,248	20–32–0

June

#	Date	Opponent	Score	Win	Loss	Save	Attendance	Record
54	June. 1	@ Fighters	5–4	Kishimoto (1–1)	Miyanishi (1–1)	Yokoyama (3)	19,478	21–32–0
55	June. 2	@ Fighters	2–2 (12)				21,421	21–32–1
56	June. 4	Hawks	5–4	Stults (3–3)	Takahashi (2–1)	Yokoyama (4)	26,250	22–32–1
57	June. 5	Hawks	3–9	Wada (8–3)	T. Aoki (1–5)		31,786	22–33–1
58	June. 6	Orix	1–6	Kisanuki (5–5)	Soriano (0–1)		25,489	22–34–1
59	June. 7	Orix	10–21	Leicester (1–2)	Alvarado (0–3)		9,324	22–35–1
60	June. 9	@ Marines	2–2 (12)				18,573	22–35–2
61	June. 10	@ Marines	12–7 (12)	Oshima (1–0)	Kawagoe (2–2)		23,139	23–35–2
62	June. 12	@ Lions	6–2	Otake (1–0)	Hoashi (6–5)		31,618	24–35–2
63	June. 13	@ Lions	4–2	Alvarado (1–3)	Kishi (8–4)	Bale (1)	31,647	25–35–2
64	June. 18	Swallows	Game postponed due to rain					
65	June. 19	Swallows	5–1	Maeda (9–2)	Ishikawa (2–8)		26,161	26–35–2
66	June. 20	Swallows	2–4	Yoshinori (3–5)	Takahashi (4–5)	Lim (11)	23,175	26–36–2
67	June. 22	Tigers	7–13 (11)	K. Fujikawa (3–1)	Umetsu (0–1)		14,327	26–37–2
68	June. 23	Tigers	4–9	Standridge (3–1)	Stults (3–4)		13,028	26–38–2

== Players In/Out ==
=== In ===
==== Draft ====
1. Takeru Imamura
2. Shota Dobayashi
3. Hisashi Takeuchi
4. Hayato Shoji
5. Kota Ito
6. Taketo Kawaguchi

==== Others ====
- Ken Takahashi (free agent, from New York Mets)
- Giancarlo Alvarado (from Albuquerque Isotopes)
- Jeff Fiorentino (from Baltimore Orioles)
- Justin Huber (from Minnesota Twins)
- John Bale (from Kansas City Royals)
- Eric Stults (from Los Angeles Dodgers)
- Yuichiro Mukae (traded from Orix Buffaloes)

=== Out ===
- Colby Lewis (free agent, to Texas Rangers)
- Koichi Ogata (retired, now Hiroshima Toyo Carp Baserunning Batting Trainer Staff)
- Rui Makino (sacked, now Yokohama Baystars Batting Pitcher)
- Yoshinori Ogata (sacked, now Hiroshima Toyo Carp Scouting Staff)
- Toshimitsu Higa (sacked)
- Masayuki Hasegawa (traded to Orix Buffaloes)
- Go Kida (traded to Orix Buffaloes)

== Roster ==
2010 Hiroshima Toyo Carp
Pitchers: 12 (Japan) Hisashi Takeuchi (武内 久士); 14 (Japan) Junpei Shinoda (篠田 純平); 16 (Japan) Takeru Imamura (今村 猛); 17 (Japan) Kan Otake (大竹 寛); 18 (Japan) Kenta Maeda (前田 健太); 19 (Japan) Hirofumi Ueno (上野 弘文); 20 (Japan) Katsuhiro Nagakawa (永川 勝浩); 21 (Japan) Yuki Saitoh (齊藤 悠葵); 22 (Japan) Ken Takahashi (高橋 建); 23 (Japan) Ryuji Yokoyama (横山 竜士); 24 (United States) Eric Stults (エリック スタルツ); 28 (Japan) Koji Hiroike (広池 浩司); 29 (Japan) Tsuyoshi Sato (佐藤 剛士); 30 (Japan) Choji Mori (森 跳二); 34 (Japan) Ren Nakata (中田 廉); 36 (Japan) Hayato Aoki (青木 勇人); 39 (Japan) Tomohiro Umetsu (梅津 智弘); 41 (Japan) Takeshi Komatsu (小松 剛); 46 (Japan) Takayuki Oshima (大島 崇行); 47 (Japan) Takahiro Aoki (青木 高広); 48 (Japan) Hideki Kishimoto (岸本 秀樹); 53 (Japan) Masaki Hayashi (林 昌樹); 54 (Japan) Michito Miyazaki (宮崎 充登); 57 (Japan) Taketo Kawaguchi (川口 盛外); 58 (Japan) Shinjiro Kojima (小島 心二郎); 62 (Japan) Keisuke Imai (今井 啓介); 65 (Japan) Toshiaki Aizawa (相澤 寿聡); 67 (Japan) Kota Itoh (伊東 昂大); 69 (Japan) Ken Nakamura (中村 憲); 70 (United States) Mike Schultz (マイク シュルツ); 91 (Puerto Rico) Giancarlo Alvarado (ジオ アルバラード); 94 (United States) John Bale (J．ベイル); 99 (Dominican Republic) Dioni Soriano (ディオーニ ソリアーノ); 120 (Japan) Mitsuhiro Nagakawa (永川 光浩)*; 122 (Japan) Tatsuya Yamanaka (山中 達也)*; 123 (Japan) Shota Matsuda (松田 翔太)*; 124 (Japan) Takaya Kawauchi (河内 貴哉)*; 140 (Dominican Republic) Wilfreiser Guerrero (W．ゲレロ)*	Catchers: 27 (Japan) Kazuhiro Uemura (上村 和裕); 31 (Japan) Yoshiyuki Ishihara (石原 慶幸); 32 (Japan) Yuta Shirahama (白濱 裕太); 40 (Japan) Yoshikazu Kura (倉 義和); 61 (Japan) Sho Yamamoto (山本 翔); 64 (Japan) Tsubasa Aizawa (會澤 翼); 126 (Japan) Kosuke Nakamura (中村 亘佑)*; Infielders: 00 (Japan) Akira Tanaka (田中 彰); 2 (Japan) Akihiro Higashide (東出 輝裕); 4 (Japan) Tetsuya Kokubo(小窪 哲也); 5 (Japan) Kenta Kurihara (栗原 健太); 6 (Japan) Eishin Soyogi (梵 英心); 11 (Australia) Justin Huber (J．ヒューバー); 13 (Japan) Shota Dobayashi (堂林 翔太); 25 (Japan) Takuro Ishii (石井 琢朗); 45 (Japan) Takaaki Matsumoto (松本 高明); 52 (Japan) Hayato Shoji (庄司 隼人); 56 (Japan) Tsubasa Nakatani (中谷 翼); 59 (Japan) Yoshihiko Yamamoto (山本 芳彦); 60 (Japan) Tomohiro Abe (安部 友裕); 66 (Japan) Shogo Kimura (木村 昇吾); 68 (South Korea) Shin Sung-hyun (申 成鉉)	Outfielders: 0 (Japan) Takamitsu Ioh (井生 崇光); 1 (Japan) Tomonori Maeda (前田 智徳); 10 (Japan) Takahiro Iwamoto (岩本 貴裕); 26 (Japan) Jun Hirose (廣瀬 純); 33 (Japan) Tomoya Sayashi (鞘師 智也); 35 (Japan) Naoteru Nakahigashi (中東 直瑛); 37 (Japan) Ryuhei Matsuyama (松山 竜平); 38 (Japan) Masato Akamatsu (赤松 真人); 43 (United States) Jeff Fiorentino (J．フィオレンティーノ); 44 (Japan) Yuichiro Mukae (迎 祐一郎); 49 (Japan) Sohichiro Amaya (天谷 宗一郎); 50 (Japan) Masamitsu Suzuki (鈴木 将光); 51 (Japan) Masafumi Suenaga (末永 真史); 55 (Japan) Shigenobu Shima (嶋 重宣); 63 (Japan) Yoshihiro Maru (丸 佳浩); 121 (Japan) Keita Yamauchi (山内 啓太)*; Manager: 77 (Japan) Kenjiro Nomura (野村 謙二郎); Coaches: 74 (Japan) Yutaka Ohno (大野 豊) (head, pitching); 72 (Japan) Junzo Uchida (内田 順三) (general batting); 82 (Japan) Itsuki Asai (浅井 樹) (batting); 80 (Japan) Yasuyuki Yamauchi (山内 泰幸) (pitching); 71 (Japan) Shinji Koh (高 信二) (infield, baserunning); 79 (Japan) Koichi Ogata (緒方 孝市) (general fielding); 84 (Japan) Yukihiro Ueda (植田 幸弘) (battery); 89 (Japan) Katsumi Mizumoto (水本 勝己) (bullpen); * Development player

== Long-term injury list ==
Date Injured	Player	Injury	Return Date
14 March 2010	Kan Otake	Right shoulder pain	14 May 2010
13 April 2010	Katsuhiro Nagakawa	Right adductor magnus muscle	25 May 2010
16 May 2010	Mike Schultz	Low back pain	August 2010
10 June 2010	Kenta Kurihara	Broken ulna	July 2010
