= Aoki (surname) =

Aoki (青木; "Blue Tree", from the color ao + ki "tree") is a Japanese surname. People with the name include:

== Arts and entertainment ==
- Devon Aoki (born 1982), model and actress, daughter of "Rocky" Aoki
- Kazuyo Aoki (born 1947), Japanese voice actress
- Mayuko Aoki (born 1975), voice actor
- Mitsue Aoki (born 1969), Japanese manga author and artist
- Ruriko Aoki (青木 瑠璃子), Japanese voice actress and singer
- Ryka Aoki, American professor, poet and award-winning science fiction writer
- Sayaka Aoki (comedian) (born 1973), Japanese comedian
- Sayaka Aoki (voice actress) (born 1972), Japanese voice actress, also goes by Shizuka Aoki
- Shigeru Aoki, Japanese painter
- Shiki Aoki (青木 志貴; born 1990), Japanese actor, voice actor, model and fashion designer
- Shoichi Aoki, creator of the Fruits and Fresh Fruits photobooks
- Steve Aoki, Japanese American record producer, son of Rocky Aoki
- Takao Aoki, manga artist
- Tatsu Aoki, jazz double bass player and record producer
- Tomohiko Aoki, light novel author
- Toshio Aoki (青木年雄; 1854-1912), Japanese American artist
- Tsunenori Aoki (青木 玄徳; born 1987), Japanese actor and model
- Tsuru Aoki (1892–1961), Japanese-American stage and screen actress
- Ume Aoki, female Japanese manga artist
- Yoshino Aoki, Japanese video game music composer
- Yūji Aoki (1945–2003), Japanese manga artist
- Yuko Aoki (born 1977), Japanese bikini model
- Yuya Aoki, one of the pen names of Japanese author, Tadashi Agi

== Politicians ==
- Ai Aoki (born 1965), Japanese politician
- Kazuhiko Aoki (born 1961), Japanese politician, son of Mikio Aoki
- Kazuo Aoki (1889–1982), Japanese government minister during the Second Sino-Japanese War, and into World War II
- Mikio Aoki (1934–2023), Japanese politician, father of Kazuhiko Aoki
- Aoki Shūzō (1844–1914), Japanese diplomat in the Meiji and Taishō eras

== Sportspersons ==
- Ai Aoki (born 1985), synchronised swimmer
- Akinobu Aoki (青木 彰信), Japanese Paralympic swimmer
- Chika Aoki (青木 千佳; born 1990), Japanese fencer
- Go Aoki (born 1999), Japanese curler
- Hayato Aoki (青木 勇人; born 1977), former Nippon Professional Baseball player, current coach
- Hiroaki "Rocky" Aoki (1938–2009), Japanese American former Olympic wrestler, founder of Benihana restaurants
- Isao Aoki (born 1942), golfer
- Kanae Aoki (青木 香奈枝; born 1985), Japanese ice hockey player
- Kota Aoki (born 1987), Japanese footballer
- Masanori Aoki (青木 正則; 1927–?), Japanese speed skater
- Masumi Aoki (青木 益未; born 1994), Japanese hurdler
- Mik Aoki (born 1968), American college baseball coach
- Aoki brothers, Nobuatsu, Takuma and Haruchika, three brothers who were all Grand Prix motorcycle riders
- Nori Aoki (born 1982), former NPB and MLB player
- Reona Aoki (青木 玲緒樹; born 1995), Japanese swimmer
- Ryota Aoki (born 1984), Japanese footballer
- Ryota Aoki (born 1996), Japanese footballer
- Sayaka Aoki (born 1986), Japanese athlete
- Shinya Aoki (青木 真也; born 1983), mixed martial artist and professional wrestler
- Takahiro Aoki (born 1981), Nippon Professional Baseball player
- Takayuki Aoki, Japanese racing driver
- Takeshi Aoki, Japanese footballer
- Taketo Aoki (青木 勇人; born 1974), Japanese basketball player and coach
- Takuya Aoki (born 1990), Japanese footballer
- Tomomi Aoki (born 1994), Japanese swimmer
- Tsubasa Aoki (青木 翼; born 1993), Japanese footballer
- Yozo Aoki (1929–2014), Japanese footballer

== Other ==
- Guy Aoki, head and co-founder of the Media Action Network for Asian Americans
- Jiun Aoki (青木 慈雲; 1929–1998), Japanese Buddhist monk and artist
- Kikuyo Aoki (born 1968), professional Go player
- Masakatsu Aoki (born 1957), amateur astronomer
- Richard Aoki (1938–2009), Japanese American civil rights activist
- Shinichi Aoki (born 1965), professional Go player
- Taijiro Aoki, a captain of the Imperial Japanese Navy
