= 2013 Central League Climax Series =

First stage
Team (Wins)		Manager	Season
Hiroshima Toyo Carp (2)		Kenjiro Nomura	69–72–3 (.489), 17 GB
Hanshin Tigers (0)		Yutaka Wada	73–67–4 (.521), 12.5 GB
- Dates: October 12–13

Final stage
Team (Wins)		Manager	Season
Yomiuri Giants (4)		Tatsunori Hara	84–53–7 (.613), 12.5 GA
Hiroshima Toyo Carp (0)		Kenjiro Nomura	69–72–3 (.489), 17 GB
- Dates: October 16–18
- MVP: Tomoyuki Sugano (Yomiuri)

The 2013 Central League Climax Series (CLCS) consisted of two consecutive series, Stage 1 being a best-of-three series and Stage 2 being a best-of-six with the top seed being awarded a one-win advantage. The winner of the series advanced to the 2013 Japan Series, where they competed against the 2013 Pacific League Climax Series (PLCS) winner. The top three regular-season finishers played in the two series. The CLCS began on with the first game of Stage 1 on October 12 and ended with the final game of Stage 2 on October 18.

== First stage ==
=== Summary ===
Hiroshima Toyo Carp won the series, 2–0.

Game	Date	Score	Location	Time	Attendance
1	October 12	Hiroshima Toyo Carp – 8, Hanshin Tigers – 1	Koshien Stadium	3:34	46,923
2	October 13	Hiroshima Toyo Carp – 7, Hanshin Tigers – 4	Koshien Stadium	3:02	46,902

=== Game 1 ===
Saturday, October 12, 2013, 2:00 pm (JST) at Koshien Stadium in Nishinomiya, Hyōgo Prefecture
Team	1	2	3	4	5	6	7	8	9	R	H	E
Hiroshima	0	0	0	1	3	0	0	0	4	8	13	0
Hanshin	0	0	0	1	0	0	0	0	0	1	5	1
WP: Kenta Maeda (1–0) LP: Shintaro Fujinami (0–1); Home runs: HIR: Kila Ka'aihue (1), Yoshihiro Maru (1), Takahiro Iwamoto (1); HAN: None

=== Game 2 ===
Sunday, October 13, 2013, 2:00 pm (JST) at Koshien Stadium in Nishinomiya, Hyōgo Prefecture
Team	1	2	3	4	5	6	7	8	9	R	H	E
Hiroshima	0	0	0	0	0	2	1	3	1	7	11	0
Hanshin	1	0	0	0	0	0	0	1	2	4	6	2
WP: Bryan Bullington (1–0) LP: Randy Messenger (0–1); Home runs: HIR: None; HAN: Tsuyoshi Nishioka (1), Shinjiro Hiyama (1)

== Final stage ==
=== Summary ===
Yomiuri Giants won the series, 4–0*.

Game	Date	Score	Location	Time	Attendance
1	October 16	Hiroshima Toyo Carp – 2, Yomiuri Giants – 3	Tokyo Dome	3:27	45,107
2	October 17	Hiroshima Toyo Carp – 0, Yomiuri Giants – 3	Tokyo Dome	2:26	45,316
3	October 18	Hiroshima Toyo Carp – 1, Yomiuri Giants – 3	Tokyo Dome	2:32	46,081

* The Central League regular season champion is given a one-game advantage in the Final Stage.

=== Game 1 ===
Wednesday, October 16, 2013, 6:00 pm (JST) at Tokyo Dome in Bunkyō, Tokyo
Team	1	2	3	4	5	6	7	8	9	R	H	E
Hiroshima	0	2	0	0	0	0	0	0	0	2	8	1
Yomiuri	0	0	0	1	0	1	1	0	X	3	6	1
WP: Tetsuya Yamaguchi (1–0) LP: Ryuji Yokoyama (0–1) Sv: Kentaro Nishimura (1); Home runs: HIR: None; YOM: Hayato Sakamoto (1)

=== Game 2 ===
Thursday, October 17, 2013, 6:00 pm (JST) at Tokyo Dome in Bunkyō, Tokyo
Team	1	2	3	4	5	6	7	8	9	R	H	E
Hiroshima	0	0	0	0	0	0	0	0	0	0	3	0
Yomiuri	0	0	3	0	0	0	0	0	X	3	6	0
WP: Tomoyuki Sugano (1–0) LP: Kenta Maeda (0–1); Home runs: HIR: None; YOM: Takayuki Terauchi (1)

=== Game 3 ===
Friday, October 18, 2013, 6:00 pm (JST) at Tokyo Dome in Bunkyō, Tokyo
Team	1	2	3	4	5	6	7	8	9	R	H	E
Hiroshima	1	0	0	0	0	0	0	0	0	1	3	0
Yomiuri	0	0	1	1	1	0	0	0	X	3	7	0
WP: Toshiya Sugiuchi (1–0) LP: Yusuke Nomura (0–1) Sv: Kentaro Nishimura (2)
