= 慈雲 =

慈雲 or 慈云 may refer to:

- Ciyun Temple (disambiguation) (慈云寺), several temples
- Jaunam (자운암 慈雲庵), a Buddhist temple in Seoul
- Jiun Aoki (青木 慈雲, 1929–1998), Japanese Buddhist monk and artist
- Tsz Wan Shan (慈雲山), a residential area in Kowloon, Hong Kong
