= Yoshihiro Maru =

Japanese baseball player (born 1989)

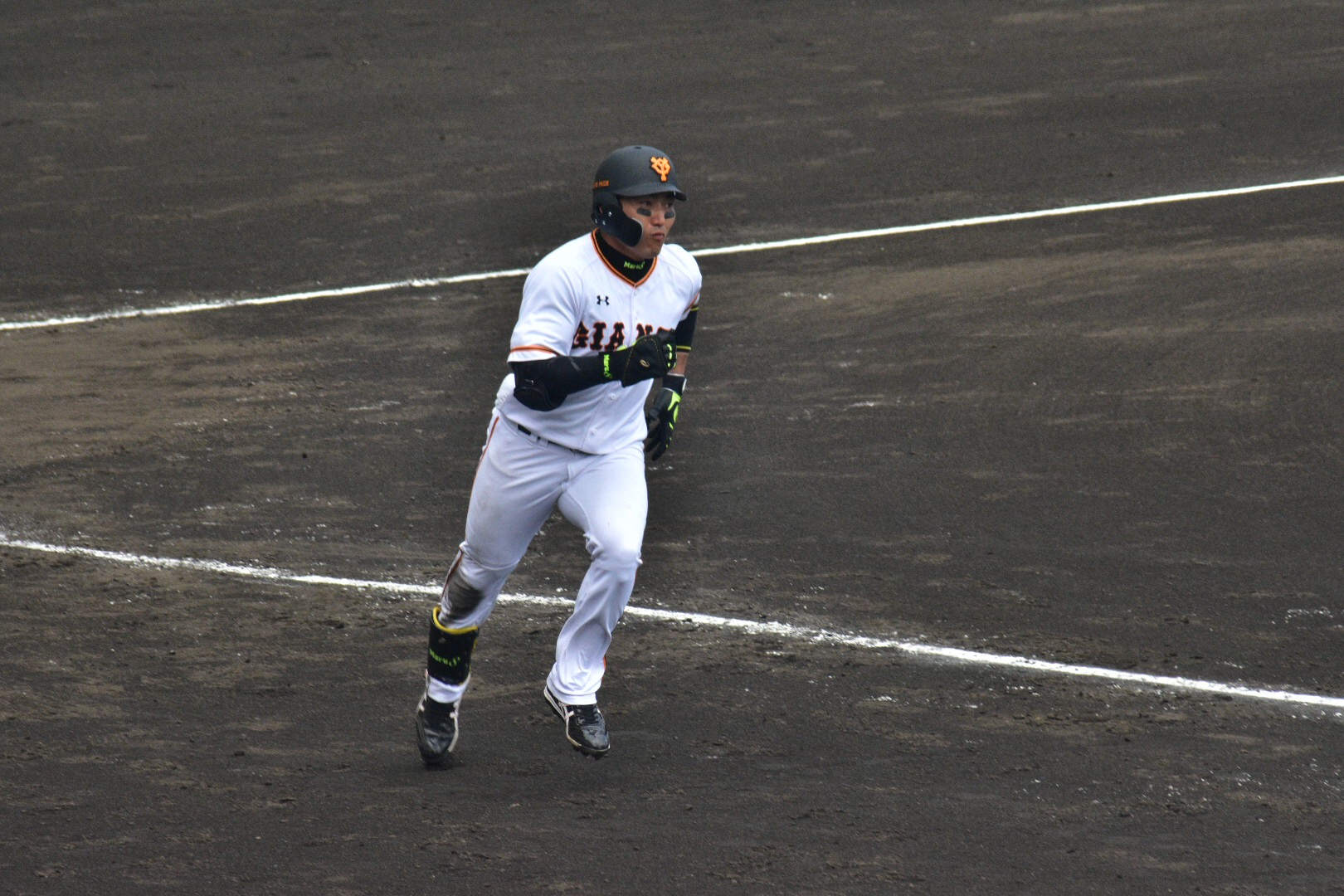
- Maru with the Yomiuri Giants

Yomiuri Giants – No. 8
- Outfielder
- Born: April 11, 1989 (age 37); Katsuura, Chiba, Japan
- Bats: Left Throws: Right

debut
- September 12, 2010, for the Hiroshima Toyo Carp

NPB statistics (through July 7, 2024)
- Batting average: .279
- Hits: 1,782
- Home runs: 276
- Runs batted in: 899
- Stolen bases: 180
- Stats at Baseball Reference

Teams
- Hiroshima Toyo Carp (2008–2018); Yomiuri Giants (2019–present)

Career highlights and awards
- 2× Central League MVP (2017-2018); 1× Central League Stolen Base Champion (2013); 7× Central League Golden Glove Award (2013-2019); 8× NPB All-Star (2013-2017, 2019, 2022, 2024); 6× Best Nine Award (2014, 2016-2020); Interleague play CL Nippon Life Award Winner (2017); Hochi Professional Sports Award (2019); 7× Mitsui Golden Glove Award (2013-2019); 1× On Base Percentage Leader (2018); 1× Hits Leader (2017); Hit for the cycle on August 19, 2025
Medals
Men's baseball
Representing Japan
2019 WBSC Premier12
| Gold medal – first place | 2019 Tokyo | Team |

Yoshihiro Maru (丸 佳浩, Maru Yoshihiro; born April 11, 1989 in Katsuura, Chiba, Japan) is a Japanese professional baseball outfielder for the Yomiuri Giants of Nippon Professional Baseball (NPB). He has previously played in NPB for the Hiroshima Toyo Carp.

== Career ==
In 2007 NPB draft, Hiroshima Toyo Carp selected him in the third round.

He missed time his first year in the minors with injuries to his elbow and toe and a norovirus. He hit .277 with 21 steals in the minors in 2010. He was called up to Hiroshima later in the year. In his debut, he pinch-hit for Ren Nakata and was retired by Marc Kroon. His first hit came off Takehiko Oshimoto, singling as a pinch-hitter for Keisuke Imai. He was 3 for 19 with two walks, a steal, a run and a RBI in 14 games for the Carp in 2010.

His first NPB homer came off Tomokazu Ohka on April 19, 2011. He became Hiroshima's starting center fielder that year, unseating Soichiro Amaya and Masato Akamatsu. He hit .241/.319/.359. He was 4th in the Central League with 105 strikeouts (between Takahiro Arai and Shuichi Murata). In 2012, he batted .247/.353/.353 with 14 steals in 20 tries, splitting CF with Amaya and Akamatsu and backing up Jun Hirose in RF.

By 2013, he was back in a starting role in center, usually hitting leadoff or second. He produced at a .273/.376/.425 clip with 85 walks, 14 home runs, 82 runs and 29 steals but was caught 15 times. He won a Gold Glove after fielding .992 (albeit with just one assist); Sho Aranami and Hisayoshi Chono were the other CL Gold Glove winners. He made the CL leaders in runs (tying Chonost for second behind Wladimir Balentien), doubles (25, 9th), triples (5, 1st), steals (1st, 5 over Hayato Sakamoto), caught stealing (1st, 6 more than anyone else), walks (4th, between Shinnosuke Abe and Kazuhiro Wada), strikeouts (103, 6th, between Balentien and Chono) and OBP (6th, between Murata and Wada). He made his first CL All-Star team.

Early in 2014, he became the Carp's regular #3 batter. He hit .310/.419/.491 with 30 doubles, 5 triples, 19 home runs, 100 walks, 106 runs and 26 steals in 37 tries. He fielded .993 and this time also had 8 outfield assists. He was the 22nd player in NPB history to reach triple-digits in walks. He finished the year all over the CL leaderboards: 9th in average (between Kazuhiro Hatakeyama and Shingo Kawabata), 2nd in OBP (only .0003 behind Balentien), 8th in slugging (between Hector Luna and Hatakeyama), 3rd in OPS (behind Balentien and Tetsuto Yamada), tied for first in runs (with Yamada), 8th in hits (166), tied for 6th in doubles (with Mauro Gomez), tied for second in triples (four shy of Takayuki Kajitani), tied for 9th in homers (with Abe), 3rd in steals (behind Kajitani and Oshima), 2nd in caught stealing (one behind Oshima), led in walks (13 over Takashi Toritani) while falling to a tie for 9th in whiffs (with Yamada and Balentien) and 5th in total bases (263). He won his second Gold Glove and made the Best Nine as one of the CL's top three flyhawks (alongside Yuhei Takai and Matt Murton). He got three second-place votes for the 2014 Central League Most Valuable Player Award.

In the 2015 season, he struggled, hitting .249/.361/.413. He still had 28 doubles, 19 homers and 94 walks, but his steals were down (15 in 22), his strikeouts were up (143) and his average was obviously down. He still tied Kosuke Fukudome for 9th in OBP, was third in runs (after Yamada and Kawabata), tied Gomez and Yoshi Tsutsugo for 7th in doubles, tied Brad Eldred for 6th in home runs and led in walks again (5 more than Toritani). He fielded .996, with 273 putouts, 6 assists and one error. He won his third straight Gold Glove, joining Oshima and Fukudome.

Maru hit .291/.389/.481 with 30 doubles, 8 triples, 20 homers, 23 steals in 32 tries, 98 runs, 90 RBI and 84 walks in 2016. He was 3rd in the CL in runs (4 behind Yamada and Kosuke Tanaka, 5th in OBP (between Fukudome and Arai), 10th in slugging, 5th in hits (162, between Chono and Murata), was second in doubles (2 behind Murata), tied Seiya Suzuki for second in triples, missed the top ten in homers by two, was 7th in RBI (between Suzuki and Murata), placed 5th in steals and was third in walks (behind Yamada and Tsutsugo). He won a Gold Glove and joined Suzuki and Tsutsugo in the Gold Glove outfield.

For the 2017 season, his batting line was .308/.398/.505. The multi-tool threat had 109 runs, 35 doubles, 23 home runs, 83 walks and 92 RBI while his steal total was down a bit (13 SB, 3 CS). He led the CL in runs (four ahead of Tanaka), tied José López for the most hits (171), was 4th in doubles (between Masayuki Kuwahara and Tanaka), ranked 8th in circuit clouts (between Yamada and Kajitani), was third in RBI (after López and Tsutsugo), was 5th in average (between Tomohiro Abe and López), was 4th in walks (between Tanaka and Fukudome), was just behind Tanaka in OBP (both rounded to .398, Maru up a bit, Tanaka down a bit) and was 7th in slugging (between Balentien and Toshiro Miyazaki). He won another Gold Glove, made another Best Nine (alongside Suzuki and Tsutsugo) and won the 2017 Central League Most Valuable Player Award., with 196 of 286 first-place votes and 1,134 vote points to 381 for runner-up Kazuki Yabuta (Tomoyuki Sugano was second in first-place votes at 40).

Maru was again dominant in 2018 despite missing time with a hamstring injury: .306/.468/.627, 39 HR, 130 BB, 109 R, 97 RBI, .996 fielding percentage. He was second in runs (21 behind Yamada), second in homers (two behind Neftali Soto), 4th in RBI (between Dayan Viciedo and Soto), first in walks (24 more than Yamada), first in OBP (.030 ahead of Suzuki), second in slugging (.017 behind Soto) and first in OPS (39 ahead of Suzuki). He joined Suzuki and Soto in getting the Best Nine honors and won another Gold Glove. He won the 2018 CL MVP award, with 241 first-place votes (221 ahead of runner-up Daichi Osera) and 1,314 vote points (Osera was next at 482). He was the first repeat MVP in the CL since Alex Ramirez 9 years prior and the first Japanese native to repeat as CL MVP since the legendary Sadaharu Oh in the late 1970s. He became a free agent at year's end.

On December 11, 2018, Maru signed a 5-year, 2.55 billion yen deal with the Yomiuri Giants.

== International career ==
Maru represented the Japan national baseball team at the 2014 MLB Japan All-Star Series, 2015 exhibition games against Europe and 2019 WBSC Premier12.

With Japan for the 2014 MLB Japan All-Star Series, he went 3 for 13 with a RBI triple, playing center when Yuki Yanagita was in right. He also was with Japan for the 2015 Global Baseball Match against Team Europe, going 0 for 3 with a walk, playing left when Sho Nakata manned first.

November 1, 2019 Maru was convened to the Japan for the 2019 WBSC Premier12.
