= Hiroki Ueno =

Hiroki Ueno may refer to:

- Hiroki Ueno (baseball) (born 1986), Japanese baseball pitcher for the Chiba Lotte Marines
- Hiroki Ueno (ice hockey) (born 1986), Japanese ice hockey winger for the Nippon Paper Cranes
