= Ciyun Temple =

Ciyun Temple (simplified Chinese: 慈云寺; traditional Chinese: 慈雲寺; pinyin: Cíyún Sì), may refer to:

- Ciyun Temple (Huai'an), in Huai'an, Jiangsu, China
- Ciyun Temple (Chongqing), in Nan'an District of Chongqing, China
