= Tomoyuki Sugano =

Japanese baseball player (born 1989)

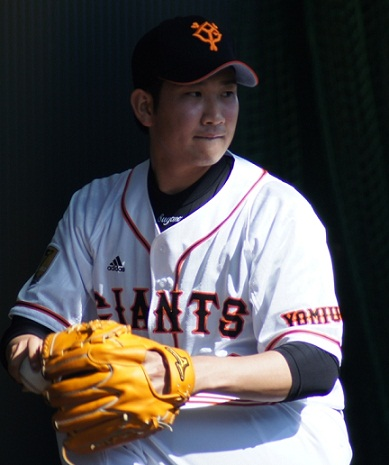
- Sugano with the Yomiuri Giants in 2013

Free agent
- Pitcher
- Born: October 11, 1989 (age 37); Sagamihara, Kanagawa Prefecture, Japan
- Bats: Right Throws: Right

Professional debut
- NPB: March 30, 2013, for the Yomiuri Giants
- MLB: March 30, 2025, for the Baltimore Orioles

NPB statistics (through 2024 season)
- Win–loss record: 136–74
- Earned run average: 2.43
- Strikeouts: 1,585

MLB statistics (through 2026 season)
- Win–loss record: 22–22
- Earned run average: 5.00
- Strikeouts: 202
- Stats at Baseball Reference

Teams
- Yomiuri Giants (2013–2024); Baltimore Orioles (2025); Colorado Rockies (2026)

Career highlights and awards
- 3× Central League MVP (2014, 2020, 2024); Central League Climax Series MVP (2013); Japanese Triple Crown (2018); 2× Eiji Sawamura Award (2017, 2018); 3× Central League Mitsui Golden Glove Award (2016–2018); 8× NPB All-Star (2013–2019, 2022); 3× Central League wins leader (2017, 2018, 2020); 4× Central League ERA leader (2014, 2016–2018); 2× Central League strikeout leader (2016, 2018); Pitched a no-hitter in the Climax Series on October 14, 2018
Medals
Men's baseball
Representing Japan
WBSC Premier12
Bronze medal – third place	2015 Tokyo	Team

Tomoyuki Sugano (菅野 智之, Sugano Tomoyuki; born October 11, 1989) is a Japanese professional baseball pitcher who is a free agent. He has played in Major League Baseball (MLB) for the Baltimore Orioles and Colorado Rockies, and in Nippon Professional Baseball (NPB) for the Yomiuri Giants. Sugano is a three-time winner of the Central League Most Valuable Player Award and a two-time winner of the Eiji Sawamura Award.

== Career ==
=== College career ===
Sugano went to Tokai University, where he had a 37–4 win–loss record and a 0.57 earned run average (ERA). In 2010, he set a career-high 157 km/h (98 mph) in college.

==== 2011 NPB draft ====
Sugano was a top pitching prospect for the October 2011 NPB draft. Prior to the draft selection, he declared his desire to join the Yomiuri Giants and play under the guidance of his uncle, former Giants manager Tatsunori Hara. The Hokkaido Nippon-Ham Fighters also decided to select him as their first pick. In the draft lottery, the Fighters drew the lucky straw, to the surprise and disappointment of Manager Hara and the Giants for they had assumed no other team would pick Sugano.

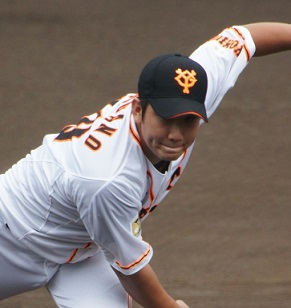
Sugano in 2014

Both Sugano's father and grandfather were disappointed because they were not notified of the Fighters' intention to draft him, the latter even quoted saying it was a violation of human rights. The Fighters did admit to having intentionally kept their intention to draft Sugano unannounced, and apologized for the surprise and the commotion they caused.

After long consideration and deliberation with his family, Sugano finally announced on November 21 his decision to turn down the Fighters' offer and instead take the year off and re-enter the 2012 NPB draft. "I may be taking a longer route (to becoming a professional ballplayer), but my childhood dream (of playing for the Giants) was stronger," he said, hinting at his intention to wait until the Giants win the rights to negotiate with him. He also mentioned that he wasn't as upset about not being informed by the Fighters ahead of time that they might select him, but rather because they promised they wouldn't select him. Only two players in NPB history have turned down the Fighters: Shinji Kuroda in 1976 and Ikuo Takayama in 1980.

Having no team to play for, he then stayed with Tokai University for another year using the "graduation postponement system" established for students who are unable to land post-graduation jobs while they are still in college. He was not allowed to play in Tokai's official games, but this did not sway him enough to join the Industrial League for it would have taken at least two years before he could have been drafted again.

=== Yomiuri Giants ===
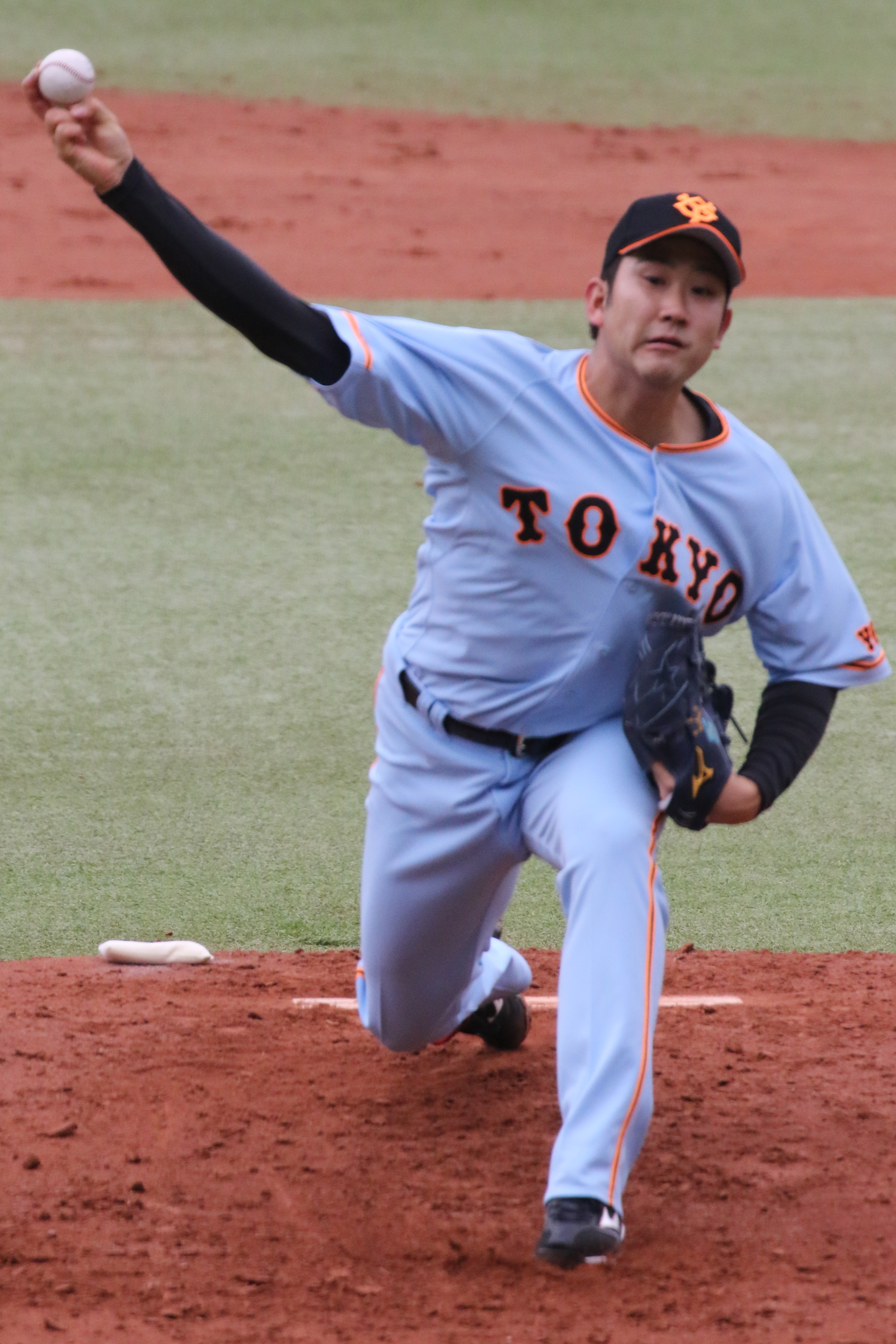
Sugano in 2016

Sugano was selected as the Giants' first pick in 2012. In his rookie year, Sugano was named Climax Series MVP and made his first of six consecutive NPB All-Star Games.

In 2014, Sugano won the Central League MVP and his first ERA title. In 2017, Sugano won the Central League MVP Award and the Eiji Sawamura Award, becoming the first Giants pitcher to win both in the same season since Masumi Kuwata. After a strong season for the Yomiuri Giants, Sugano received the moniker “Tommy Sugar” for his sweet pitch mix Sugano won his second consecutive Eiji Sawamura Award in 2018, and achieved the pitching triple crown, leading the league in strikeouts, ERA and wins. He threw a postseason no hitter against the Yakult Swallows, eliminating them from the postseason. In 2019 Sugano finished the season with an ERA of 3.89, the worst of his career. He also threw the fewest innings of his NPB career, had his fewest strikeouts and his home run rate was twice that of his career rate.

After the 2020 season, on December 8, 2020, the Giants announced it was allowing Sugano to enter the posting system to play in Major League Baseball (MLB).

On January 7, 2021, Sugano's posting period ended and he didn't sign with an MLB team, re-signing with the Giants. At the time, the COVID-19 pandemic was spreading around the world, and Major League Baseball had shortened its season to just 60 games. Some teams also fell into financial difficulty as they were forced to play games without fans in attendance, causing the free-agent market to stagnate. Sugano later revealed that the emotional shock of the situation was so intense that he would sometimes suddenly burst into tears.

Sugano made 24 appearances for the Giants in 2024, compiling a 15–3 record and 1.67 ERA with 111 strikeouts across 156 2/3 innings pitched. Following the season, Sugano was named the Central League MVP.

=== Baltimore Orioles ===
On December 16, 2024, Sugano signed a one-year, $13 million contract with the Baltimore Orioles of Major League Baseball. On April 5, 2025, Sugano earned his first MLB win, allowing one run over 5 1/3 innings against the Kansas City Royals. He made 30 starts for Baltimore during his inaugural MLB campaign, compiling a 10-10 record and 4.64 ERA with 106 strikeouts across 157 innings pitched.

=== Colorado Rockies ===
On February 10, 2026, Sugano signed a one-year, $5.1 million contract with the Colorado Rockies.

== International career ==
Sugano played for the Japan national baseball team at the 2015 WBSC Premier12, winning a bronze medal. At the 2017 World Baseball Classic Sugano tied with fellow Team Japan pitcher Kodai Senga for the tournament lead in strikeouts with 16; but Japan fell in the semi-finals to the eventual tournament winner Team USA, 2–1.

Sugano was selected to participate in the 2018 MLB Japan All-Star Series, but declined due to concerns about his physical condition.

== Playing style ==
Sugano is a 6 ft 1 in (186 cm), 210 lb (95 kg) right-handed pitcher. Although Sugano reached 98 mph in college, his fastball velocity was down since the beginning of his professional career. The Giants confirmed that he had ligament damage in his right elbow during the 2014 season. After rehab he set a pro career-high 96 mph in 2016.

With a three-quarters delivery Sugano throws two fastballs (four-seam, shuuto/sinker) averaging around 92 mph, a solid slider, a cutter, a curveball, and a forkball. He has excellent command, posting a BB/9 of 1.7 in his NPB career.
