= Shigeru Kaga =

Japanese baseball player

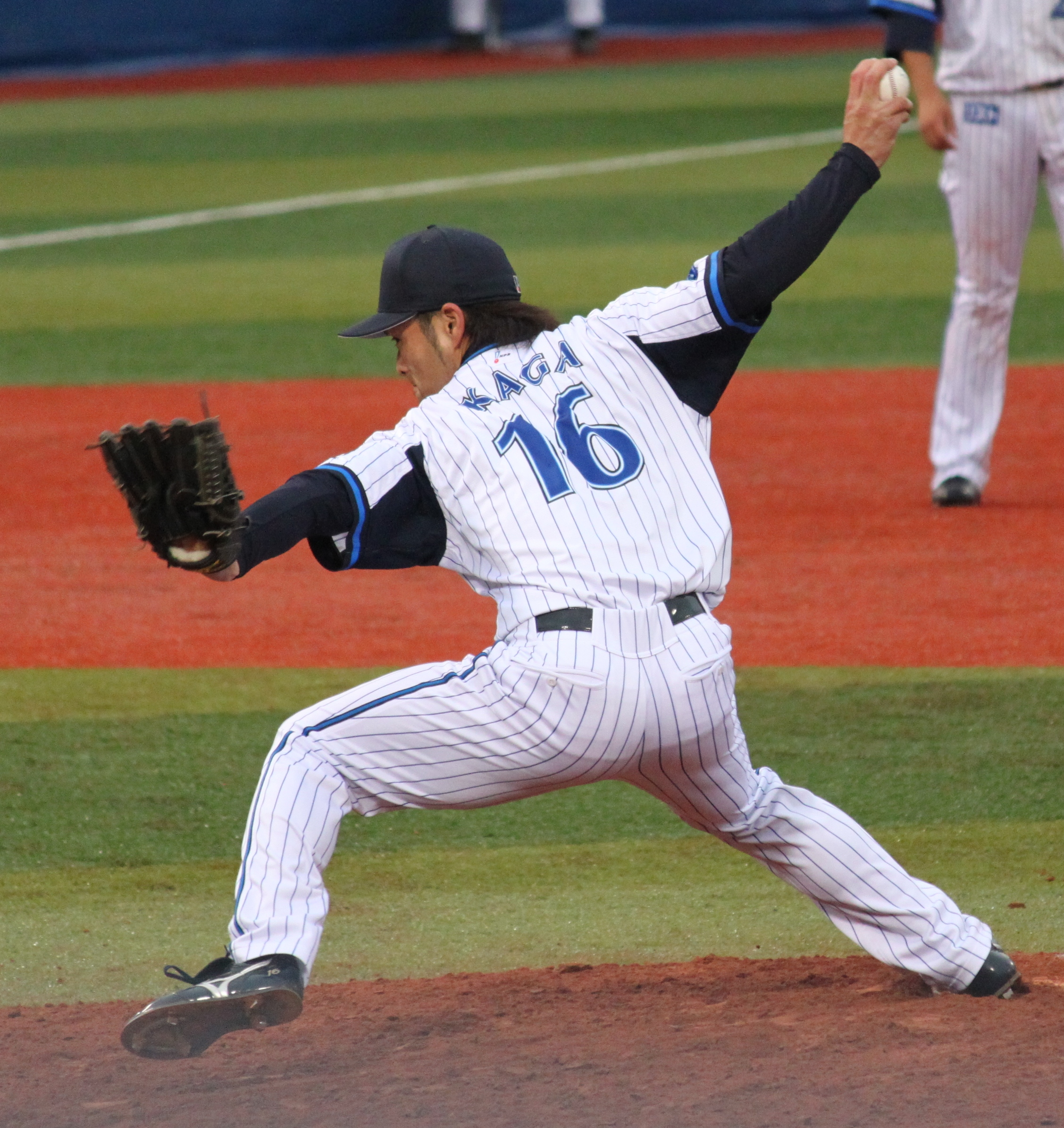
- Kaga with the Yokohama DeNA BayStars

Yokohama DeNA BayStars – No. 70
- Pitcher / Coach
- Born: April 13, 1985 (age 40); Niiza, Saitama, Japan
- Batted: Right Threw: Right

NPB debut
- March 26, 2010, for the Yokohama BayStars

Last appearance
- September 21, 2018, for the Yokohama DeNA BayStars

Career statistics (through 2018)
- Win–loss record: 12–22
- Earned run average: 4.03
- Strikeouts: 290
- Stats at Baseball Reference

Teams
- As player: Yokohama BayStars/Yokohama DeNA BayStars (2010–2018); As coach: Yokohama DeNA BayStars (2025–)

Shigeru Kaga (加賀 繁, Kaga Shigeru; born April 13, 1985 in Niiza, Saitama, Japan) is a professional Japanese baseball player. He plays pitcher for the Yokohama DeNA BayStars.
