= Yuichiro Mukae =

Japanese baseball player

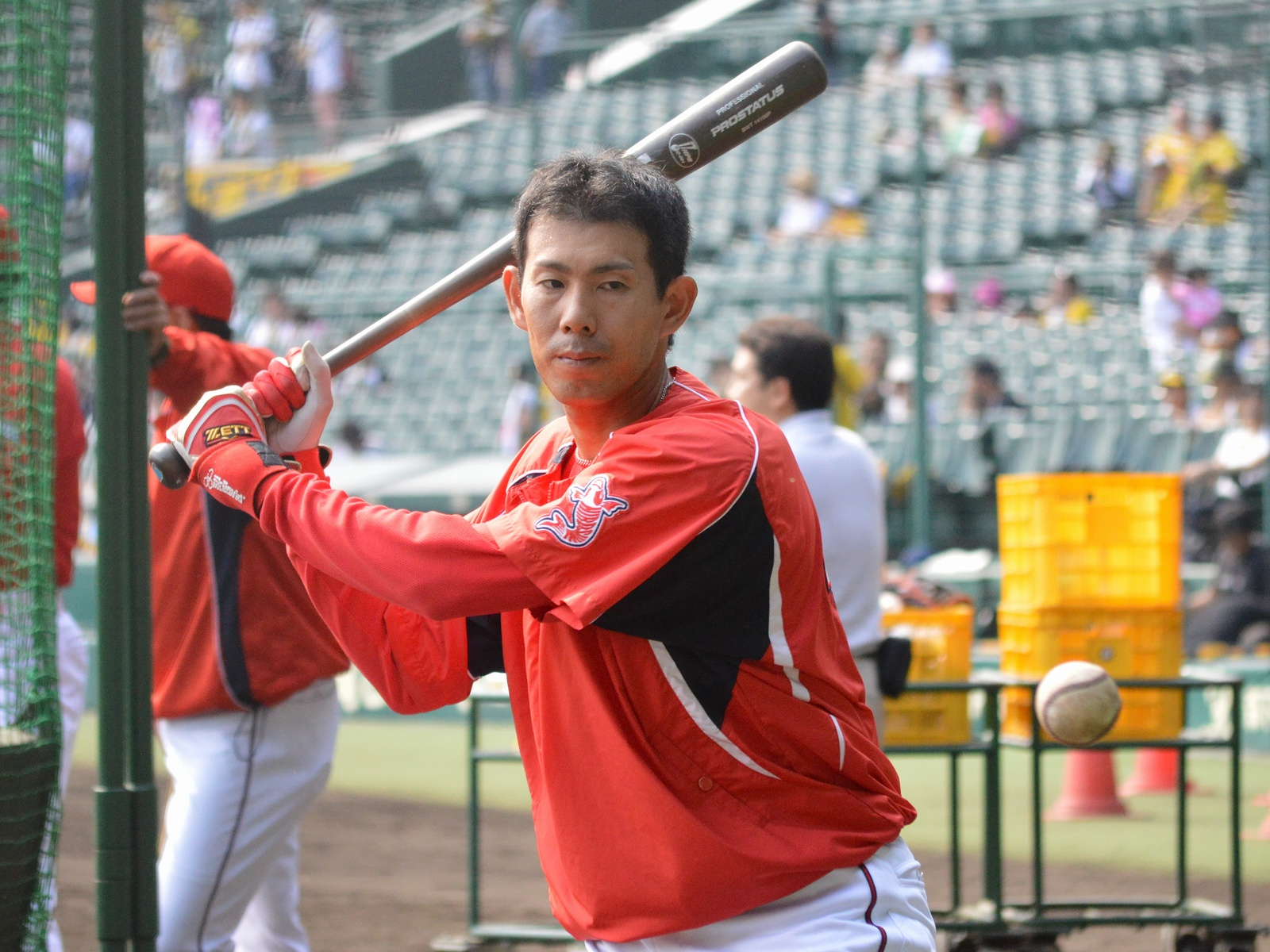

Hiroshima Toyo Carp – No. 91
- Outfielder / Coach
- Born: December 22, 1981 (age 43); Nishimatsuura District, Saga, Japan
- Batted: Right Threw: Right

NPB debut
- July 8, 2002, for the Orix BlueWave

Last appearance
- June 14, 2014, for the Hiroshima Toyo Carp

NPB statistics (through 2014 season)
- Batting average: .196
- Hits: 100
- Home runs: 10
- RBIs: 40
- Stolen Bases: 13

Teams
- As player: Orix BlueWave/Orix Buffaloes (2000–2010); Hiroshima Toyo Carp (2010–2014); As coach: Hiroshima Toyo Carp (2015–present)

Yuichiro Mukae (迎 祐一郎, Mukae Yuichiro; born December 22, 1981 in Nishimatsuura District, Saga, Japan) is a professional Japanese baseball player. He plays outfielder for the Hiroshima Toyo Carp.
