= Takeru Imamura =

Japanese baseball player

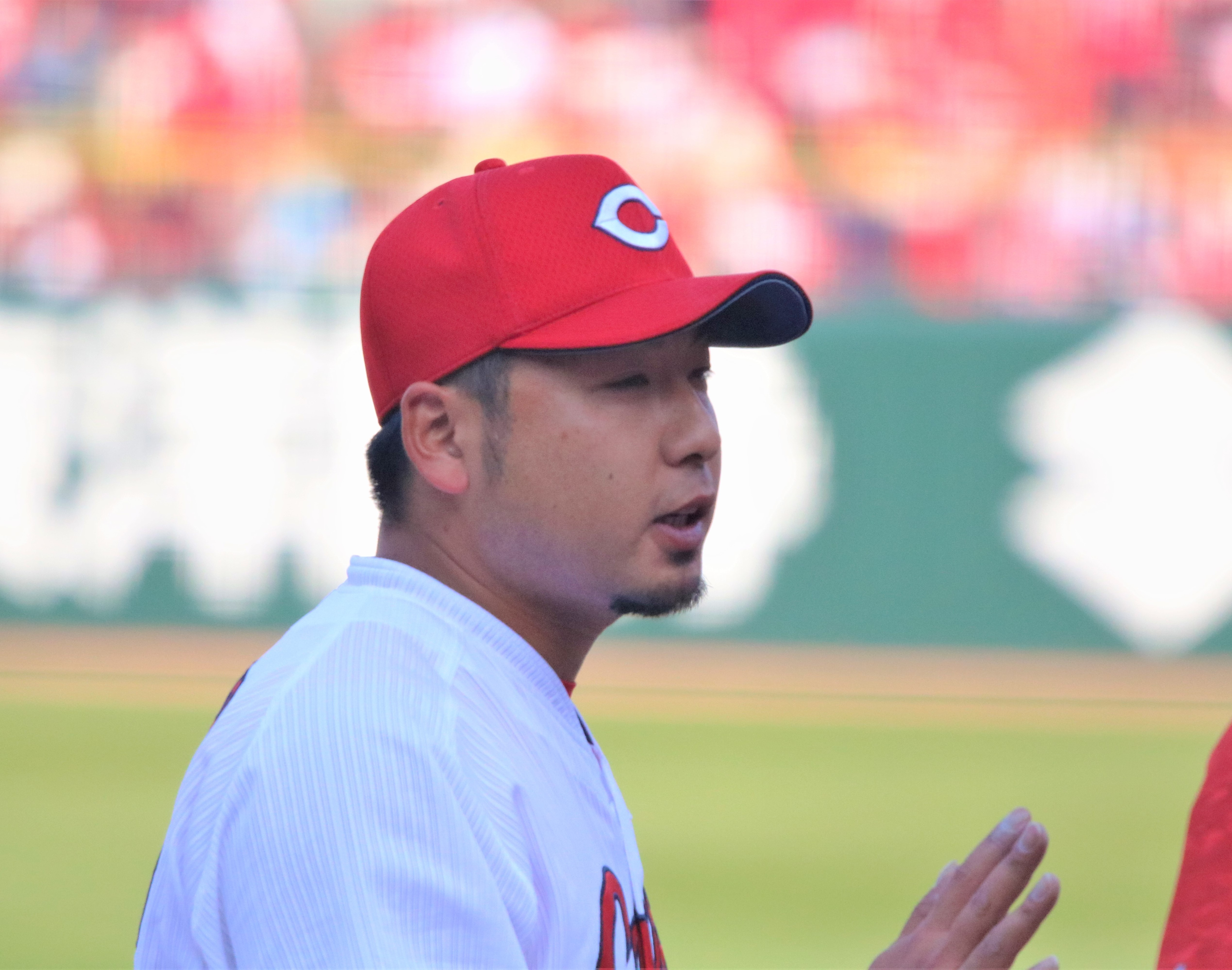
- Pitcher
- Born: April 17, 1991 (age 34); Sasebo, Nagasaki, Japan
- Bats: Right Throws: Right

NPB debut
- August 18, 2010, for the Hiroshima Toyo Carp

NPB statistics (through 2020 season)
- Win–loss record: 21-30
- ERA: 3.46
- Strikeouts: 468
- Saves: 36
- Holds: 115

Teams
- Hiroshima Toyo Carp (2010 – 2021)

Takeru Imamura (今村 猛, born April 17, 1991) is a Japanese professional baseball player. A pitcher, he plays for the Hiroshima Toyo Carp of the Central League in Nippon Professional Baseball.

Imamura played for the Japan national baseball team in the 2013 World Baseball Classic.
