= Tsuyoshi Sato =

Japanese footballer

Personal information
- Full name: Tsuyoshi Sato
- Date of birth: 5 February 1988 (age 38)
- Place of birth: Hiratsuka, Kanagawa, Japan
- Height: 1.85 m (6 ft 1 in)
- Position: Goalkeeper

Team information
- Current team: SC Sagamihara
- Number: 1

Youth career
- 2006–2009: Kanto Gakuin University

Senior career*
Years	Team	Apps	(Gls)
2010–2016	SC Sagamihara	112	(0)
- * Club domestic league appearances and goals as of 23 February 2017

Tsuyoshi Sato (佐藤健, Satō Tsuyoshi; born 5 February 1988 in Hiratsuka, Kanagawa) is a former Japanese footballer who last played for SC Sagamihara.

== Club statistics ==
Updated to 23 February 2017.

Club performance			League		Cup		Total	
Season	Club	League	Apps	Goals	Apps	Goals	Apps	Goals
Japan			League		Emperor's Cup		Total	
2010	SC Sagamihara	KSL	6	0	–		6	0
2011	SC Sagamihara	JRL (Kanto, Div. 2)	11	0	–		11	0
2012	SC Sagamihara	JRL (Kanto, Div. 1)	14	0	–		14	0
2013	SC Sagamihara	JFL	12	0	–		12	0
2014	SC Sagamihara	J3 League	28	0	–		28	0
2015	SC Sagamihara	J3 League	36	0	–		36	0
2016	SC Sagamihara	J3 League	5	0	–		5	0
Career total			112	0	–		112	0
