= Tetsuya Kokubo =

Japanese baseball player (born 1985)

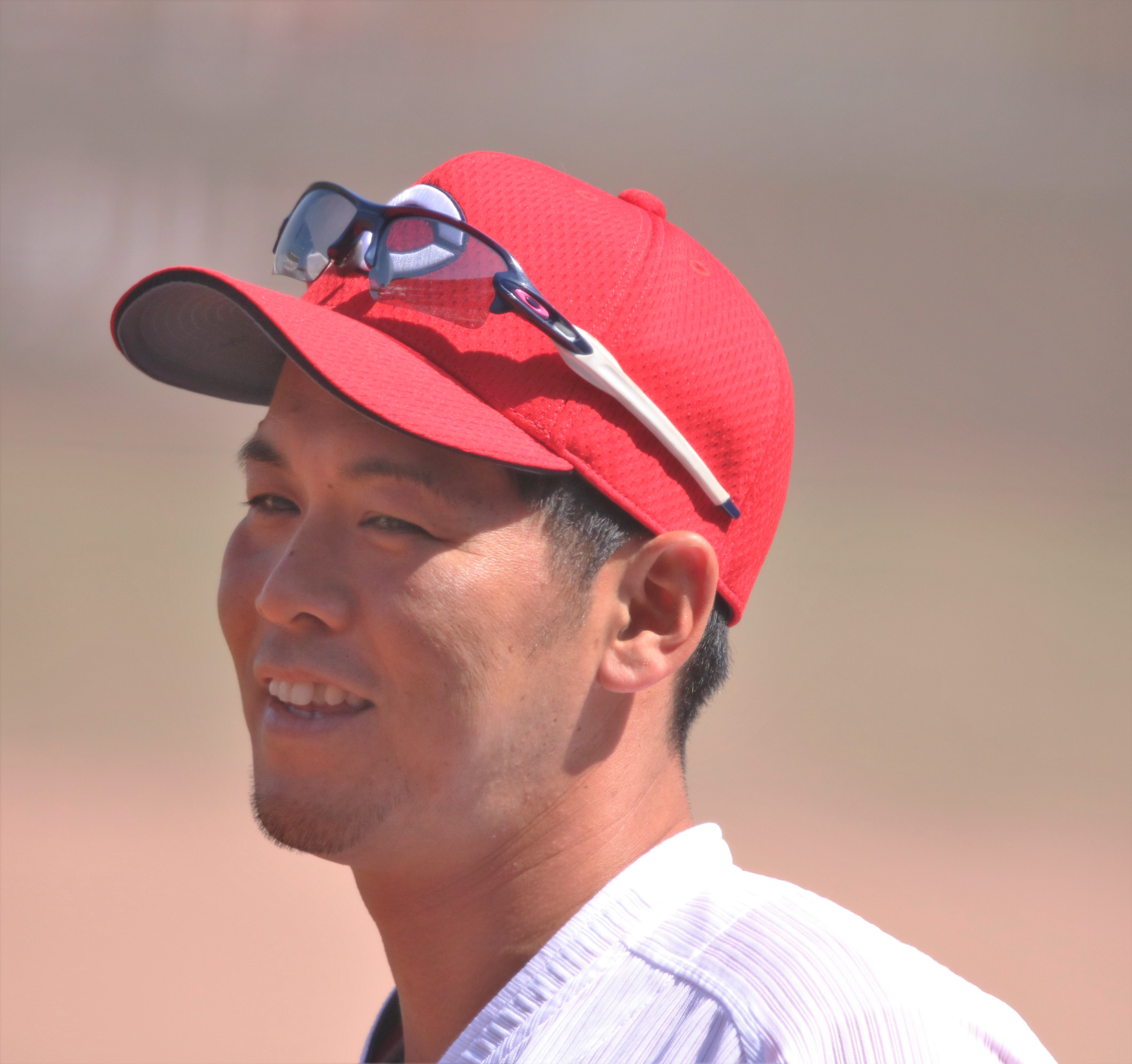
- Kokubo with the Hiroshima Toyo Carp in 2018

Hiroshima Toyo Carp – No. 89
- Infielder / Coach
- Born: April 12, 1985 (age 41); Katsuragi, Nara, Japan
- Batted: Right Threw: Right

NPB debut
- April 26, 2008, for the Hiroshima Toyo Carp

Last NPB appearance
- September 30, 2021, for the Chiba Lotte Marines

NPB statistics
- Batting average: .257
- Home runs: 19
- Runs batted in: 155
- Stats at Baseball Reference

Teams
- As player: Hiroshima Toyo Carp (2008–2020); Chiba Lotte Marines (2021); As coach: Hiroshima Toyo Carp (2022–present)

Tetsuya Kokubo (小窪 哲也, Kokubo Tetsuya; born April 12, 1985) is a Japanese former professional baseball infielder. He played in Nippon Professional Baseball (NPB) for the Hiroshima Toyo Carp and Chiba Lotte Marines.

== Career ==
Hiroshima Toyo Carp selected Kokubo with the third selection in the 2007 NPB draft.

On April 26, 2008, Kokubo made his NPB debut.

On December 2, 2020, he became a free agent.

On November 11, 2021, it was announced that he will serve as an infield defense and running base coach at his old club Hiroshima Toyo Carp from 2022. After that, he also served in the same position in 2023, and from 2024, he moved into the role of hitting coach.
