= Itsuki Asai =

Japanese baseball player

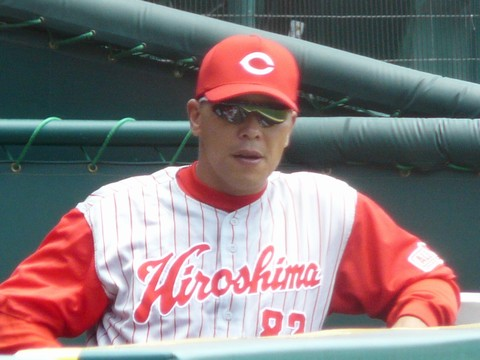
- Infielder / Outfielder / Coach
- Born: December 14, 1971 (age 54); Toyama, Toyama, Japan
- Batted: Left Threw: Left

debut
- April 18, 1993, for the Hiroshima Toyo Carp

Last NPB appearance
- October 16, 2006, for the Hiroshima Toyo Carp

NPB statistics (through 2006)
- Batting average: .285
- Hits: 523
- Home runs: 52
- RBI: 259
- Stolen bases: 41
- Stats at Baseball Reference

Teams
- As player: Hiroshima Toyo Carp (1990–2006); As coach: Hiroshima Toyo Carp (2007–2019)

Itsuki Asai (浅井 樹, Asai Itsuki; born December 14, 1971) is a former baseball player from Japan. Asai played in the Nippon baseball league. He initially played in the Pioneer League, before moving to the Hiroshima Toyo Carp in the Central League. At times, he played as a pinch hitter.
