= Shinji Koh =

Japanese baseball player (born 1967)

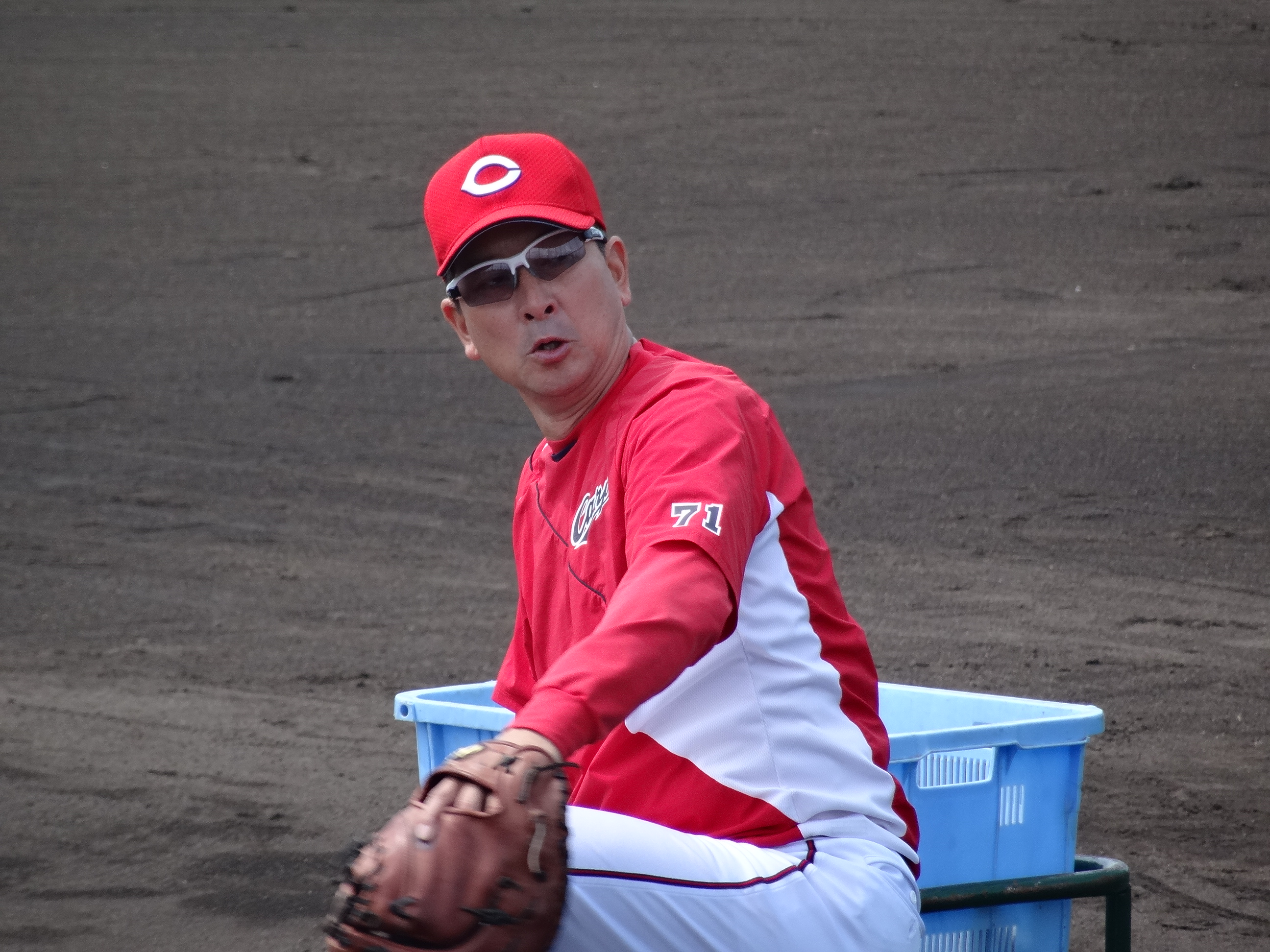
- Koh with the Hiroshima Toyo Carp

Hiroshima Toyo Carp – No. 71
- Infielder / Coach
- Born: April 16, 1967 (age 58); Kitakyushu, Fukuoka, Japan
- Batted: Left Threw: Right

NPB debut
- April 17, 1988, for the Hiroshima Toyo Carp

Last NPB appearance
- September 12, 1998, for the Hiroshima Toyo Carp

Career statistics
- Batting average: .235
- Home runs: 3
- Hits: 139
- Stats at Baseball Reference

Teams
- As player: Hiroshima Toyo Carp (1986–1998); As coach: Hiroshima Toyo Carp (1999–present)
- Last updated on: 27 December 2018

Shiji Koh (高 信二, Koh Shinji; born April 16, 1967 in Kitakyushu, Fukuoka, Japan) is a former professional Japanese baseball player.
