= Shota Dobayashi =

Japanese baseball player (born 1991)

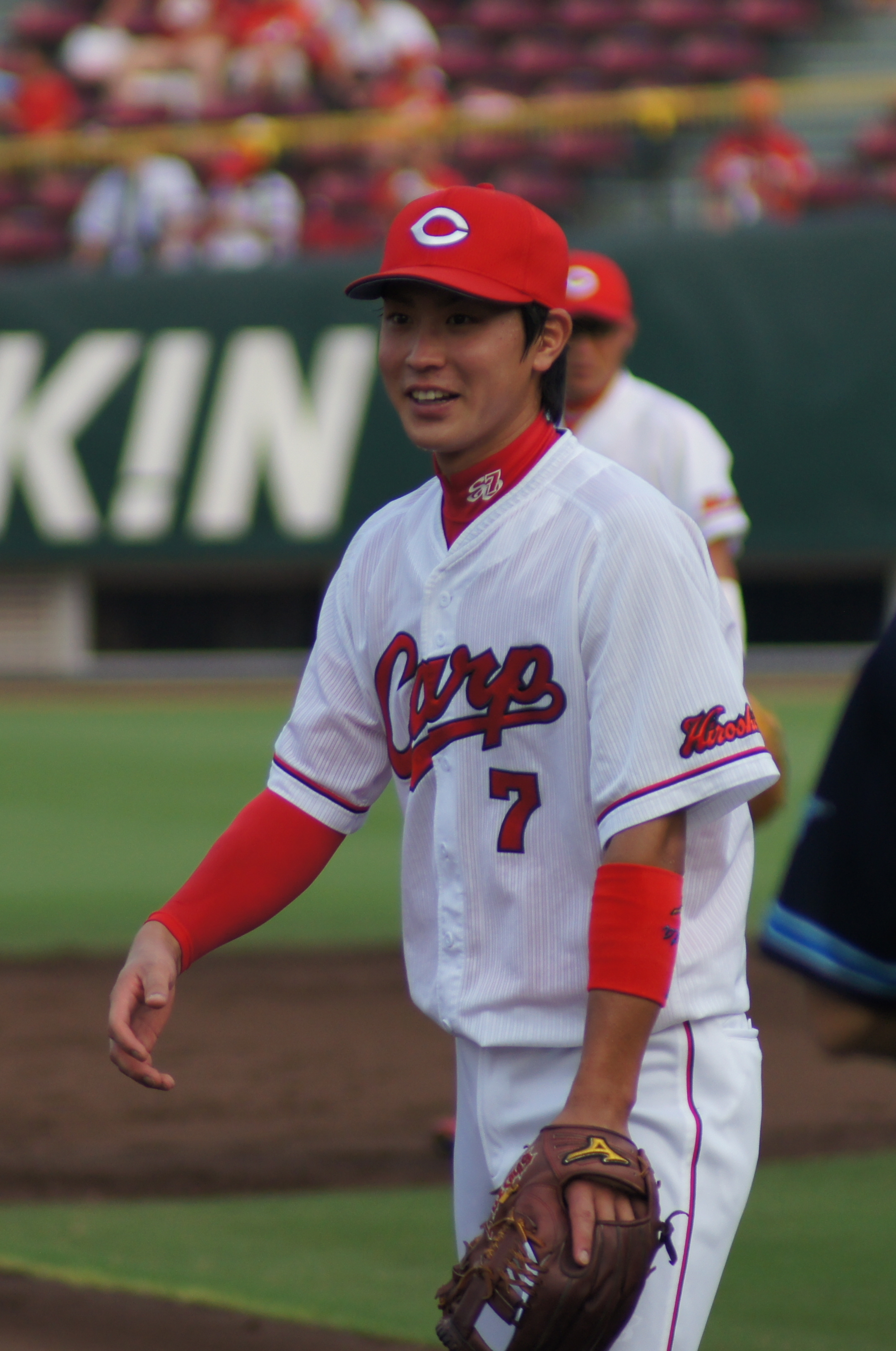
- Dobayashi with the Hiroshima Toyo Carp

Hiroshima Toyo Carp – No. 7
- infielder
- Born: August 17, 1991 (age 35); Toyota, Aichi, Japan
- Bats: Right Throws: Right

NPB debut
- March 30, 2012, for the Hiroshima Toyo Carp

NPB statistics (through 2026 season)
- Batting average: .242
- Hits: 667
- Home runs: 67
- RBIs: 284
- Stolen Bases: 41
- Stats at Baseball Reference

Teams
- Hiroshima Toyo Carp (2010–present)

Career highlights and awards
- 3× NPB All-Star (2012–2014)

Shota Dobayashi (堂林 翔太, Dōbayashi Shōta; born August 17, 1991, in Toyota, Aichi, Japan) is a professional Japanese baseball player. He plays infielder for the Hiroshima Toyo Carp.

== Personal life ==
He is married with former TBS announcer Erina Masuda on November 6, 2014. He has one child, a boy.
