= Tsubasa Aoki =

Japanese footballer

Tsubasa Aoki 青木 翼
Personal information
- Full name: Tsubasa Aoki
- Date of birth: November 17, 1993 (age 32)
- Place of birth: Shizuoka, Japan
- Height: 1.82 m (6 ft 0 in)
- Position: Midfielder

Team information
- Current team: Maruyasu Okazaki
- Number: 15

Youth career
- Shimizu Commercial HS
- 2012–2015: Juntendo University

Senior career*
Years	Team	Apps	(Gls)
2015–2019	FC Gifu	49	(2)
2019	→ Thespakusatsu Gunma (loan)	8	(0)
2020–	Maruyasu Okazaki	10	(3)
- * Club domestic league appearances and goals as of 13:31, 16 January 2021 (UTC)

Tsubasa Aoki (青木 翼, Aoki Tsubasa; born November 17, 1993 in Shizuoka, Shizuoka) is a Japanese football player for Maruyasu Okazaki.

== Club statistics ==
Updated to 23 February 2018.

Club performance			League		Cup		Total	
Season	Club	League	Apps	Goals	Apps	Goals	Apps	Goals
Japan			League		Emperor's Cup		Total	
2015	FC Gifu	J2 League	11	0	–		11	0
2016	FC Gifu	J2 League	16	0	1	0	17	0
2017	FC Gifu	J2 League	16	2	0	0	16	2
Total			43	2	1	0	44	2
