= Yasuhiro Tanaka (baseball) =

Japanese baseball player (born 1987)

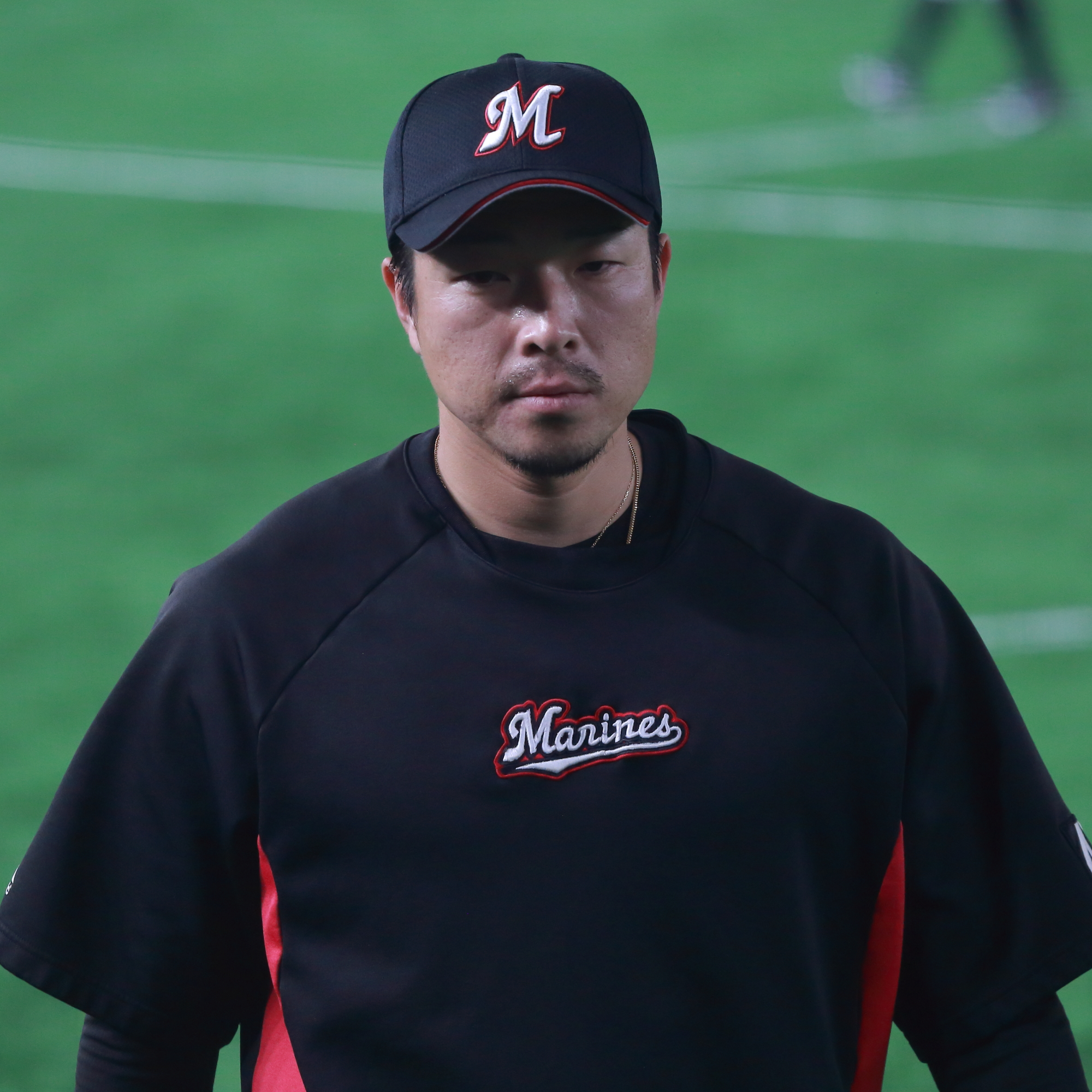
- Pitcher
- Born: June 21, 1987 (age 39)
- Batted: Right Threw: Right

NPB debut
- April 15, 2010, for the Saitama Seibu Lions

Last NPB appearance
- September 13, 2022, for the Chiba Lotte Marines

NPB statistics (through 2022 season)
- Win–loss record: 10-9
- ERA: 3.81
- Strikeouts: 124
- Stats at Baseball Reference

Teams
- Saitama Seibu Lions (2010, 2012, 2014–2015); Chiba Lotte Marines (2016–2022)

Yasuhiro Tanaka (田中 靖洋, born June 21, 1987, in Komatsu, Ishikawa) is a Japanese former professional baseball pitcher. He played for the Saitama Seibu Lions and Chiba Lotte Marines in Japan's Nippon Professional Baseball from 2010 to 2022.
