= Mike Schultz (2000s pitcher) =

American baseball player (born 1979)

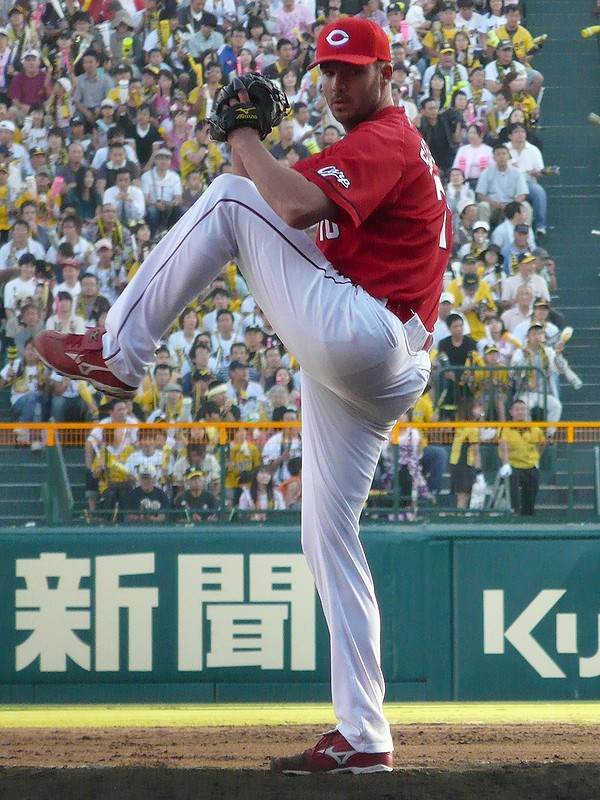
- Pitcher
- Born: November 28, 1979 (age 46); Van Nuys, California, U.S.
- Batted: Right Threw: Right

MLB debut
- April 20, 2007, for the Arizona Diamondbacks

Last MLB appearance
- April 20, 2007, for the Arizona Diamondbacks

MLB statistics
- Win–loss record: 0–0
- Earned run average: 0.00
- Strikeouts: 1

NPB statistics
- Win–loss record: 8–8
- Earned run average: 2.53
- Strikeouts: 131
- Stats at Baseball Reference

Teams
- Arizona Diamondbacks (2007); Hiroshima Toyo Carp (2008–2011); Orix Buffaloes (2013)

Michael Alan Schultz (born November 28, 1979) is an American former professional baseball pitcher.

== Amateur career ==
A native of Van Nuys, California, Schultz attended Cleveland High School and Loyola Marymount University. In 1999, he played collegiate summer baseball with the Cotuit Kettleers of the Cape Cod Baseball League and was named a league all-star. He was selected by the Diamondbacks in the second round of the 2000 MLB draft.

== Professional career ==
On July 16, 2004, while playing for the Single-A Lancaster JetHawks, he struck out five batters in an inning. (see .) He made his Major League debut on April 20, 2007, for the Diamondbacks. In the 2007–2008 off-season, Schultz signed with the Hiroshima Toyo Carp of the Japanese Central League. On March 2, 2012, Schultz signed a minor league contract with the Washington Nationals but was released in July of that year.
