= Naoki Nakahigashi =

Japanese baseball player (born 1981)

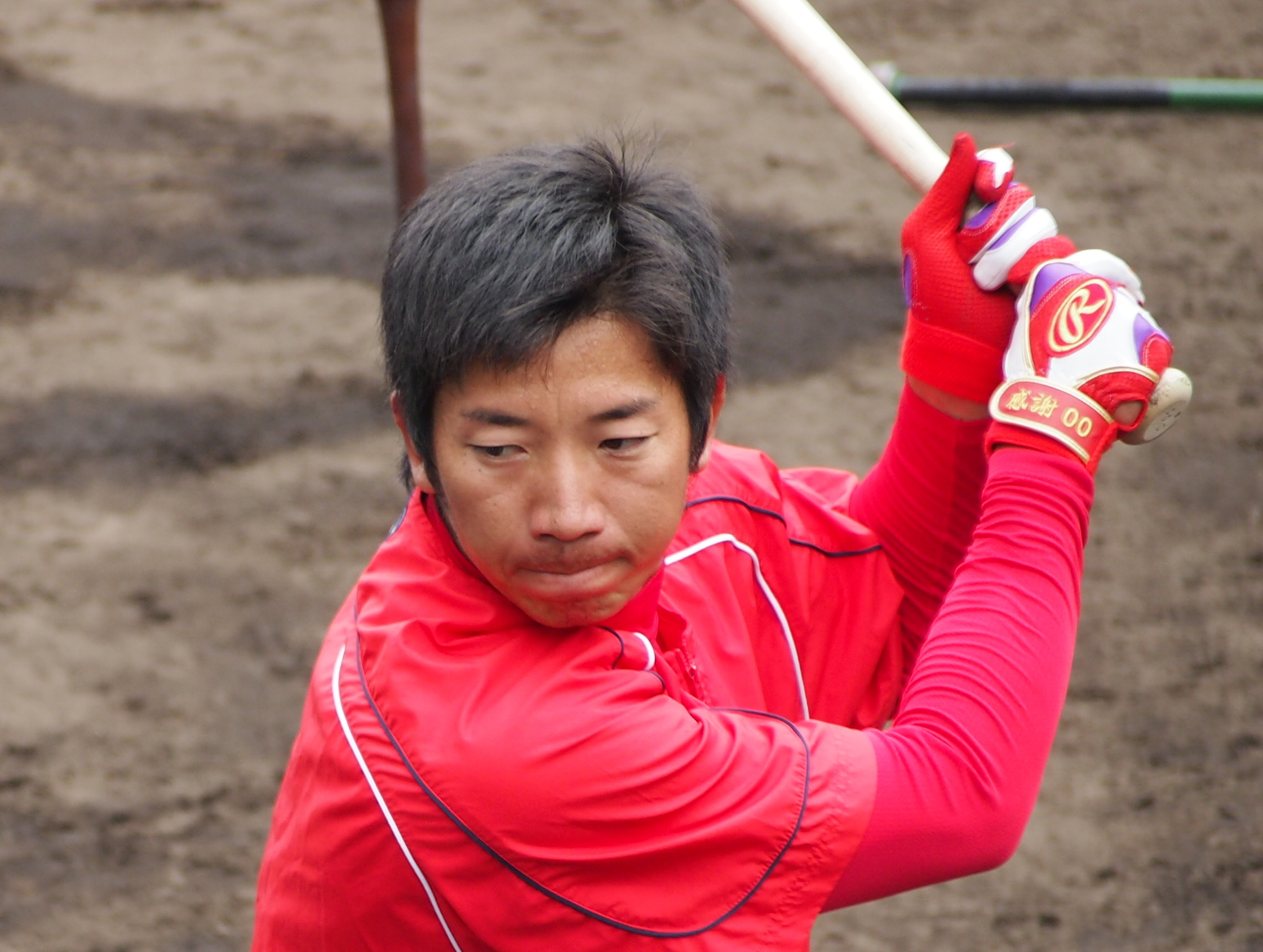
- Nakahigashi with the Hiroshima Toyo Carp
- Outfielder / Catcher
- Born: October 5, 1981 (age 44); Katsuragi, Nara, Japan
- Bats: Left Throws: Right

debut
- April 14, 2007, for the Hiroshima Toyo Carp

Teams
- Hiroshima Toyo Carp (2007–2016)

Naoki Nakahigashi (中東 直己, Nakahigashi Naoki; born October 5, 1981 in Kure, Hiroshima, Japan) is a professional Japanese baseball player. He plays outfielder for the Hiroshima Toyo Carp.
