= Takaya Kawauchi =

Japanese baseball player (born 1982)

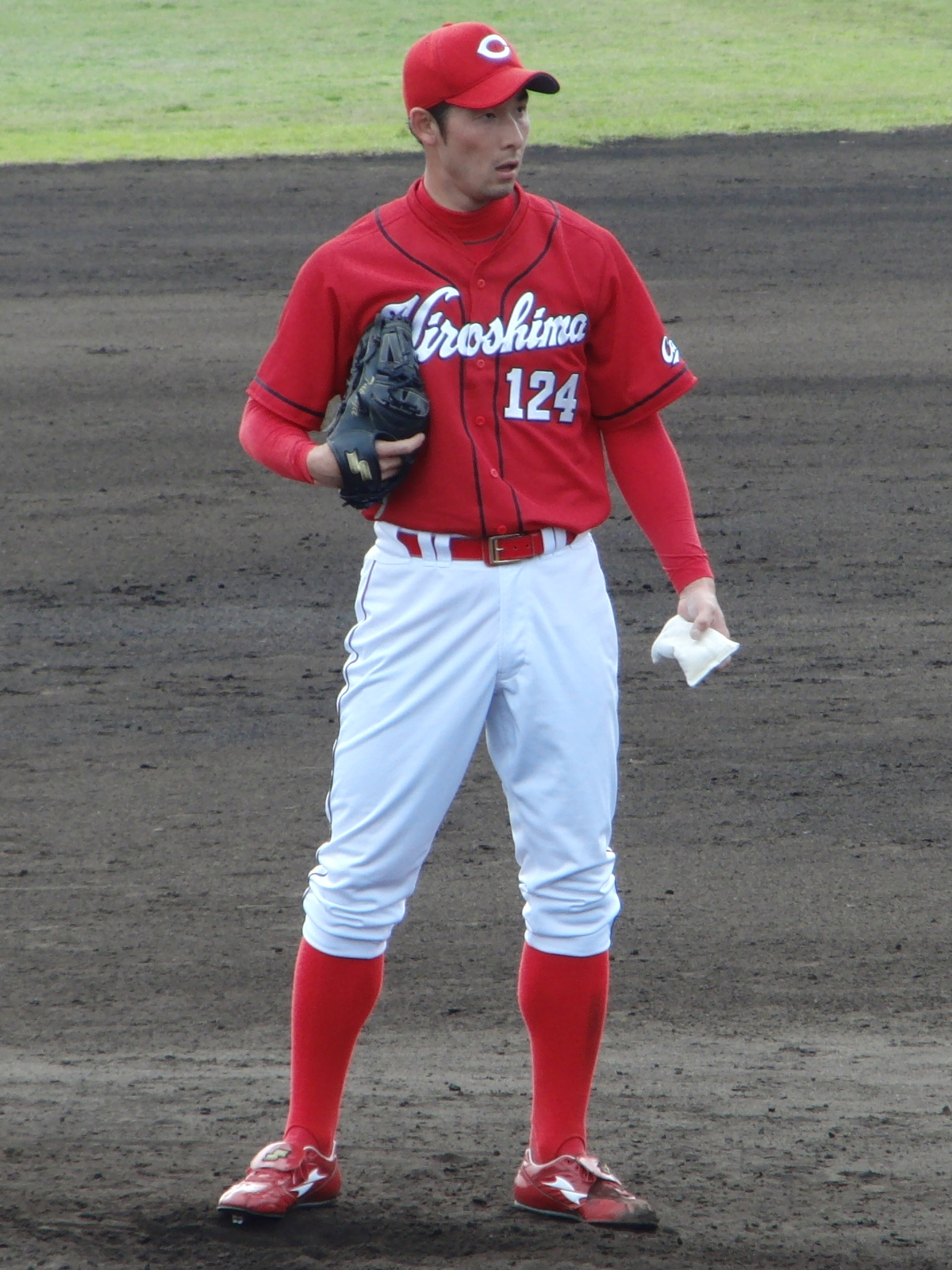
- Kawauchi with the Hiroshima Toyo Carp
- Pitcher
- Born: January 6, 1982 (age 44); Yawata, Kyoto, Japan
- Bats: Left Throws: Left

debut
- May 3, 2000, for the Hiroshima Toyo Carp
- Stats at Baseball Reference

Teams
- Hiroshima Toyo Carp (2000–2015)

Takaya Kawauchi (河内 貴哉, Kawauchi Takaya; born January 6, 1982 in Yawata, Kyoto, Japan) is a professional Japanese baseball player. He plays pitcher for the Hiroshima Toyo Carp.
