= Ken Takahashi =

Japanese baseball player and coach (born 1969)

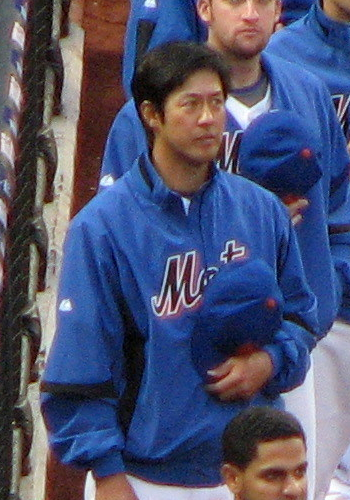
- Takahashi in 2009 with the Mets

Kia Tigers – No. 72
- Starting Pitcher / Coach
- Born: April 16, 1969 (age 57); Yokohama, Kanagawa, Japan
- Batted: Left Threw: Left

Professional debut
- NPB: April 8, 1995, for the Hiroshima Toyo Carp
- MLB: May 2, 2009, for the New York Mets

Last appearance
- MLB: September 25, 2009, for the New York Mets
- NPB: September 29, 2010, for the Hiroshima Toyo Carp

NPB statistics
- Win–loss record: 70–92
- Earned run average: 4.33
- Strikeouts: 1,066

MLB statistics
- Win–loss record: 0–1
- Earned run average: 2.96
- Strikeouts: 23
- Stats at Baseball Reference

Teams
- As player: Hiroshima Toyo Carp (1995–2008); New York Mets (2009); Hiroshima Toyo Carp (2010); As coach: Hanshin Tigers (2016–2021); Hiroshima Toyo Carp (2022–2025); Kia Tigers (2026-present)

Ken Takahashi (高橋 建, Takahashi Ken; born April 16, 1969) is a Japanese former professional baseball player. He played for the Hiroshima Toyo Carp in 1995–2008 and the New York Mets in 2009. He returned to the Carp in 2010.

Takahashi was born in Yokohama, Kanagawa, Japan. On February 6, 2009, Takahashi declared himself a free agent and expressed his desire to play in Major League Baseball. He later signed a minor league contract with an invitation to spring training with the Toronto Blue Jays.

Takahashi signed a minor league contract with the New York Mets on March 30, 2009, and was called up to the Major Leagues on April 26. He made his MLB debut on May 2, coming into the game in the middle of the third inning to replace Óliver Pérez.

Takahashi was released by the Mets on October 20, 2009.
