= Ciyun Temple (Huai'an) =

Buddhist temple in Jiangsu Province, China

Coordinates: 33°35′33″N 119°1′55″E

Ciyun Temple (Chinese: 慈云寺) is a Buddhist temple situated in Huai'an City, Jiangsu Province, China. Its original name is Ciyun Nunnery. It was established in 1615 CE.

== History ==
In 1656, during the Qing Dynasty, Shih Tsu Fu Lin called on the famous shaman Wukang Yu Lin, and let him live in Wanshan Hall (万善殿). Due to their similar interests, they quickly became friends. They only regretted that they had not met sooner. After that, Fu Lin bestowed the name "Buddhist Monk Dajue" (大觉禅师) on Yu Lin, and later Yu Lin was elevated to "Universal and Benevolent Emperor's Teacher Dajue" (大觉普济能仁国师). In 1675, the aged emperor's teacher Yu Lin wandered alone. He stayed for the night in Ciyun Temple in Huai'an House and died there. Eventually, the temple got its new name "Ciyun Buddhist Temple" because of Yu Lin's arrival.

== Present condition ==
At present, the rebuilt Shanmen Hall (山门殿) has an inscription of "Ciyun Buddhist Temple" written by Kulapati Zhao Puchu (赵朴初居士), the chairman of the Buddhist Association of China. Hall of the Heavenly King (天王殿), Tripitaka Hall (藏经殿) and Hall of the Emperor's Teacher (国师殿) have been completely renovated. The original storehouses were reconstructed into the Holy Triad Hall (三圣殿), Ti-tsang Hall (地藏殿), Kwan-yin Hall (观音殿), mediation abodes, a dining hall, and dormitories for monks. The rebuilt Ciyun Temple was officially opened to the public in 1994. Master Jueshun (觉顺法师), with the other masters and kulapatis, has retaken Ciyun Street (慈云一条街). The street has a square of more than 20 acres. They are planning to reconstruct the street to restore the resplendent original appearance of Ciyun Temple.
