= Yūta Shirahama =

Japanese baseball player

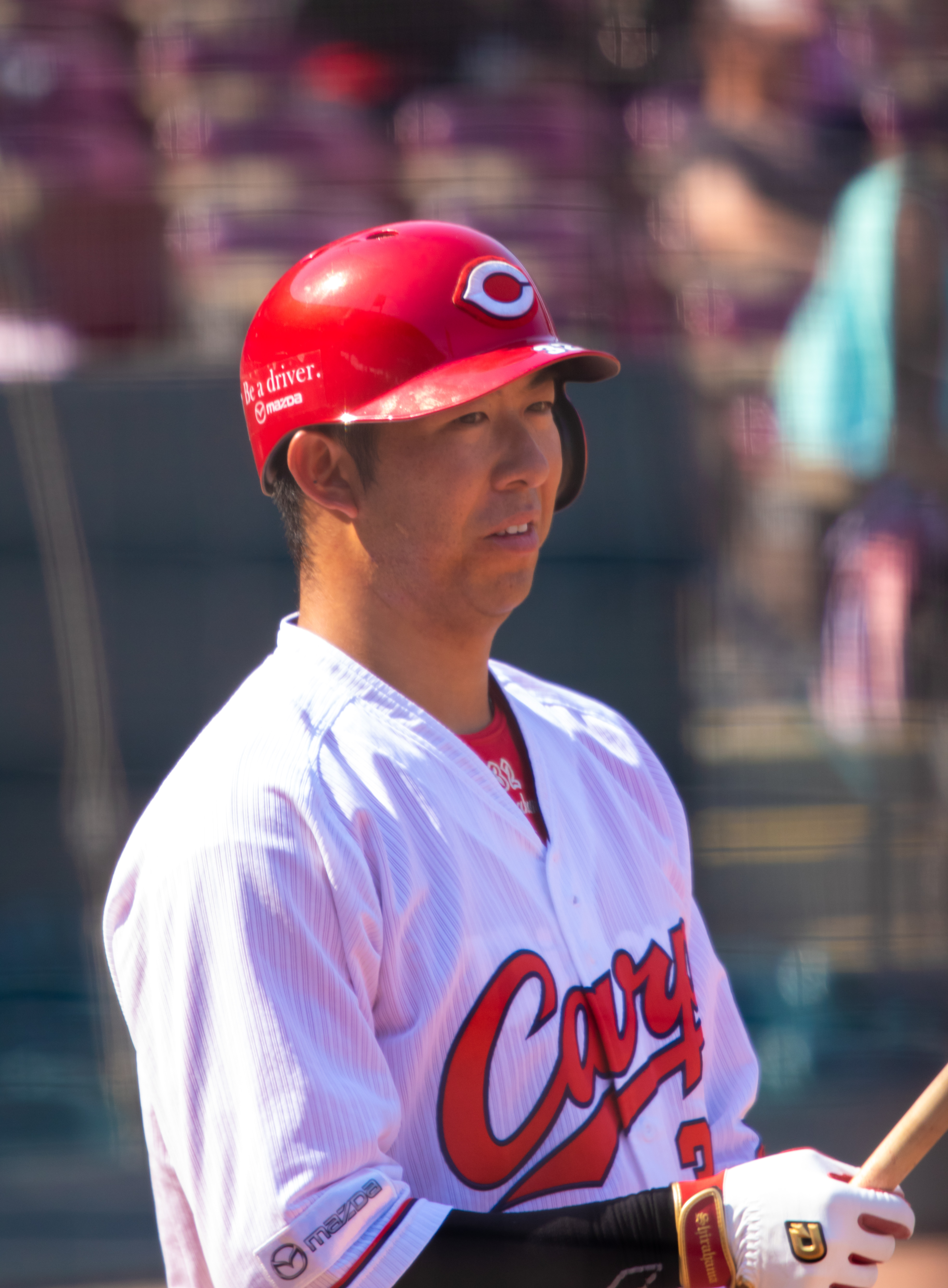
- Catcher
- Born: October 31, 1985 (age 40); Sakai, Osaka, Japan
- Batted: Right Threw: Right

NPB debut
- October 6, 2011, for the Hiroshima Toyo Carp

Last NPB appearance
- August 7, 2022, for the Hiroshima Toyo Carp

Career statistics (through 2022 season)
- Batting average: .153
- Home runs: 1
- Runs batted in: 7
- Stats at Baseball Reference

Teams
- Hiroshima Toyo Carp (2004–2022)

Yūta Shirahama (白濱 裕太, Shirahama Yūta; born October 31, 1985 in Sakai, Osaka, Japan) is a professional Japanese baseball player. He plays catcher for the Hiroshima Toyo Carp.
