= Yoshikazu Kura =

Japanese baseball player

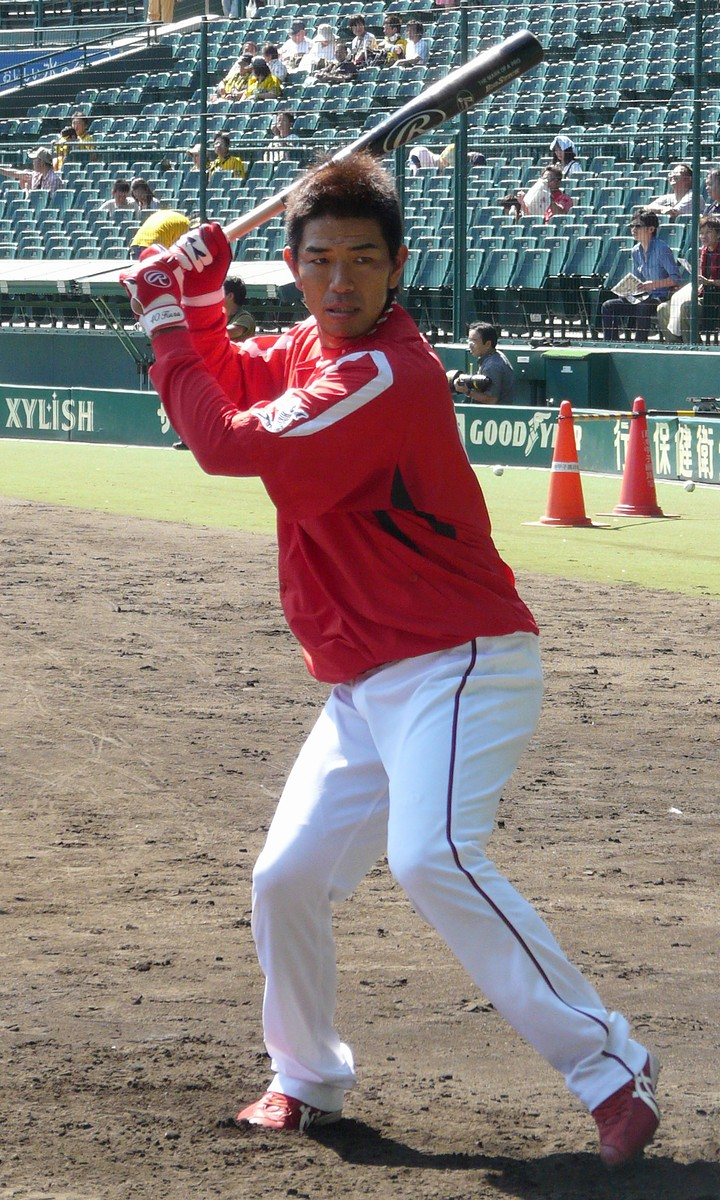
- Kura with the Hiroshima Toyo Carp

Hiroshima Toyo Carp – No. 76
- Catcher / Coach
- Born: July 27, 1975 (age 51); Kyoto, Kyoto, Japan
- Batted: Right Threw: Right

NPB debut
- May 9, 1998, for the Hiroshima Toyo Carp

Last NPB appearance
- April 1, 2015, for the Hiroshima Toyo Carp

NPB statistics
- Batting average: .217
- Hits: 339
- Home runs: 23
- RBIs: 126
- Stolen Bases: 6
- Stats at Baseball Reference

Teams
- As player: Hiroshima Toyo Carp (1998–2016); As coach: Hiroshima Toyo Carp (2016–present)
- Last updated on: 7 September 2020

Yoshikazu Kura (倉 義和, Kura Yoshikazu; born July 27, 1975 in Kyoto, Kyoto, Japan) is a professional Japanese baseball player. He plays catcher for the Hiroshima Toyo Carp.
