= Ren Nakata =

Japanese baseball player

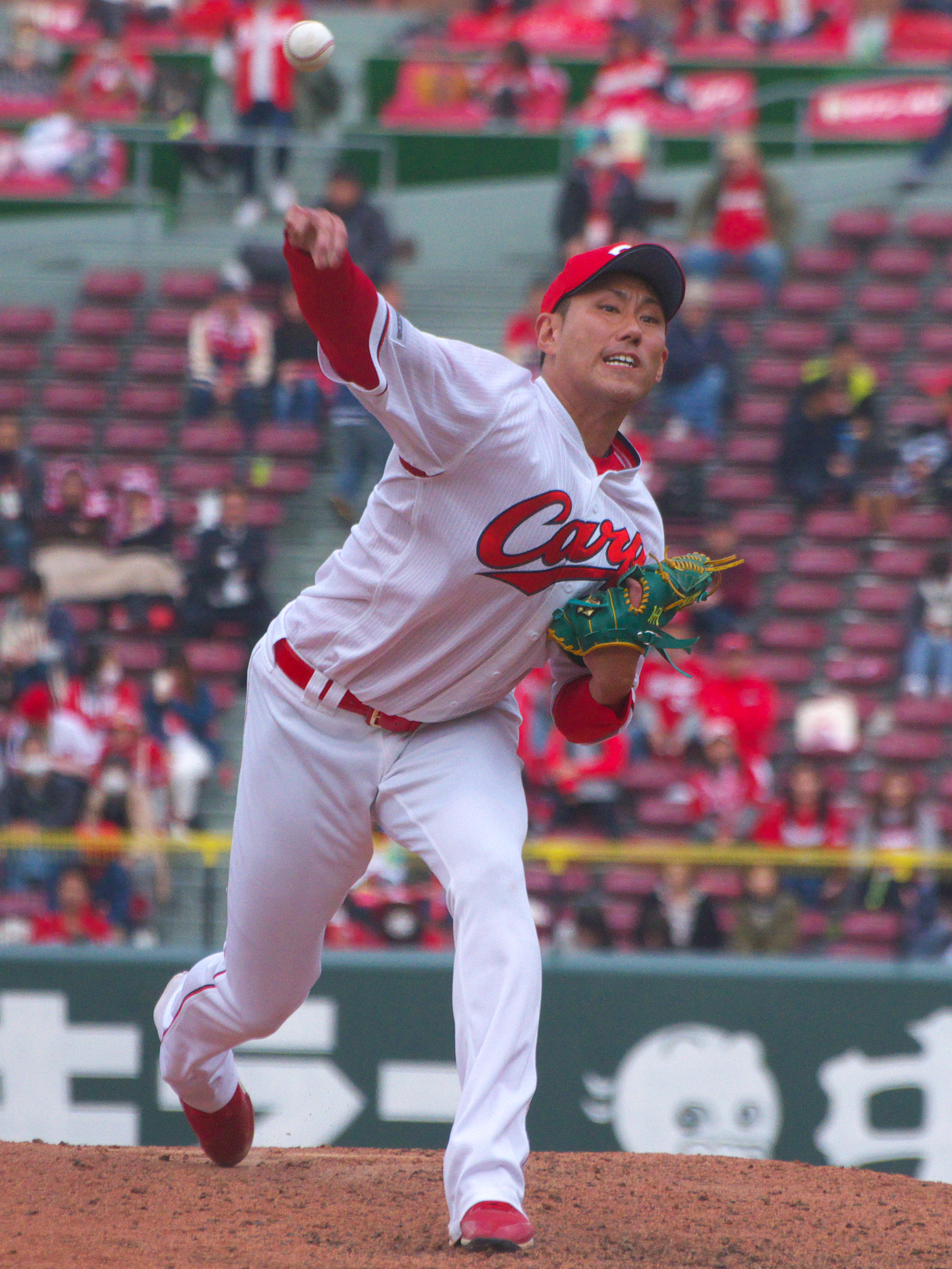
- Nakata with the Hiroshima Toyo Carp
- Pitcher
- Born: July 21, 1990 (age 35); Osaka, Osaka, Japan
- Bats: Right Throws: Right

debut
- July 16, 2010, for the Hiroshima Toyo Carp

NPB statistics (through 2022 season)
- Win–loss record: 15–16
- Earned run average: 4.43
- Strikeouts: 251
- Saves: 0
- Holds: 51
- Stats at Baseball Reference

Teams
- Hiroshima Toyo Carp (2009–2022)

Ren Nakata (中田 廉, Nakata Ren; born July 21, 1990 in Osaka, Osaka, Japan) is a professional Japanese baseball player. He plays pitcher for the Hiroshima Toyo Carp.
