= Hayato Aoki =

Japanese baseball player and coach

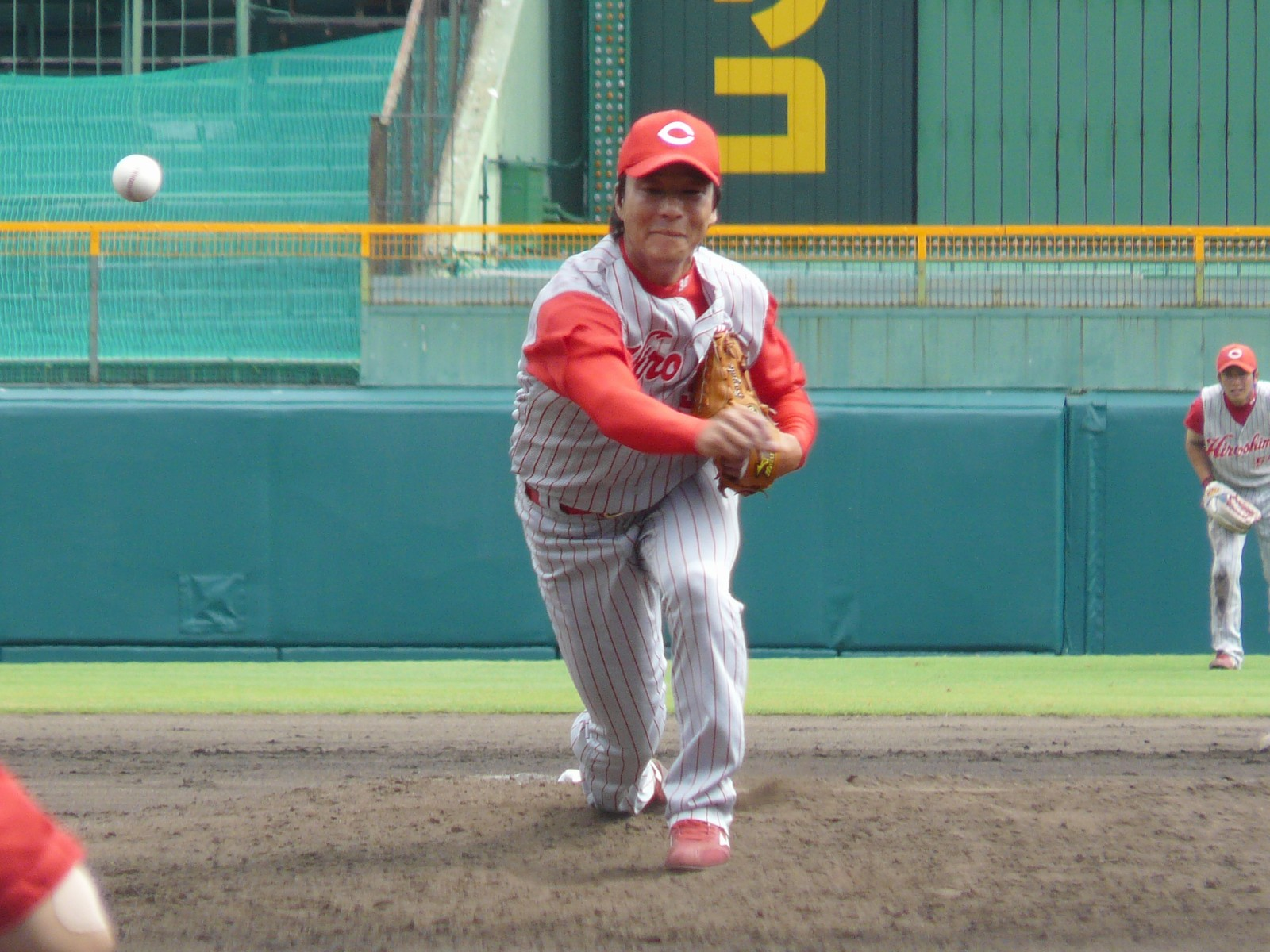

Saitama Seibu Lions – No. 93
- Pitching coach
- Born: May 6, 1977 (age 48); Tokyo, Japan
- Batted: Right Threw: Right

NPB debut
- July 12, 2000, for the Seibu Lions

Last NPB appearance
- May 1, 2010, for the Hiroshima Toyo Carp

NPB statistics (through 2010)
- Win–loss: 9–6
- Saves: 1
- ERA: 4.16
- Strikeouts: 116

Teams
- As player: Seibu Lions (2000–2006); Hiroshima Toyo Carp (2006–2010); As coach: Hiroshima Toyo Carp (2011–2019); Saitama Seibu Lions (2020–present)

Hayato Aoki (青木 勇人, Aoki Hayato; born May 6, 1977) is a Nippon Professional Baseball player. He is currently with the Hiroshima Toyo Carp of Japan's Central League.
