= Jun Hirose =

Japanese baseball player and coach

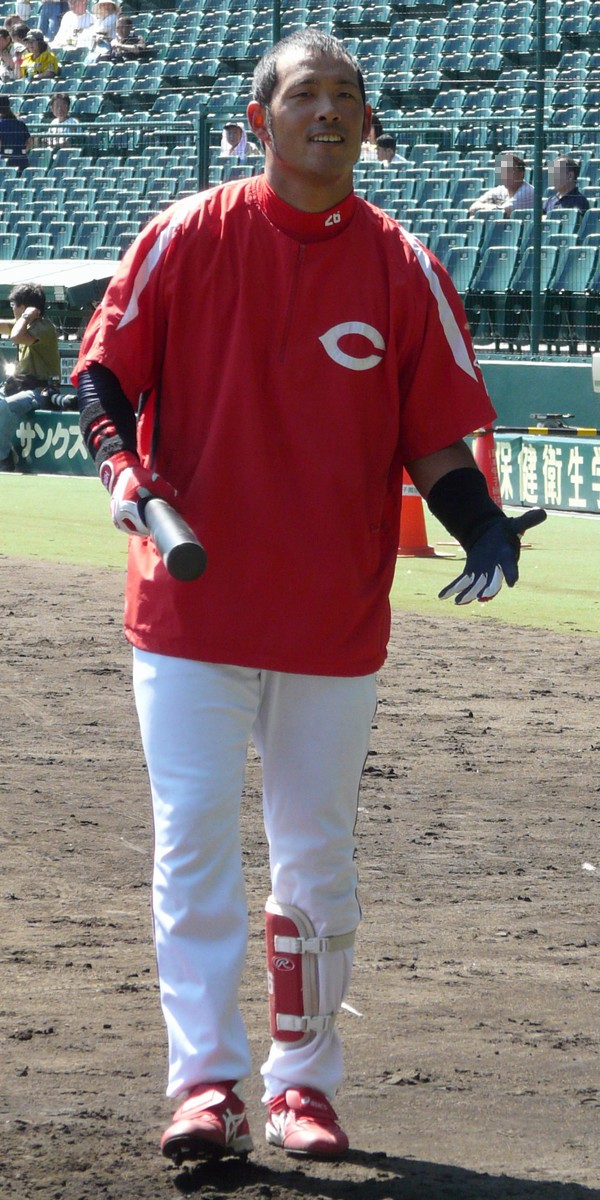
- Hirose with the Hiroshima Toyo Carp

Hiroshima Toyo Carp – No. 75
- Outfielder/Coach
- Born: March 29, 1979 (age 45); Usuki, Ōita, Japan
- Batted: Right Threw: Right

NPB debut
- March 31, 2001, for the Hiroshima Toyo Carp

Last appearance
- October 1, 2016, for the Hiroshima Toyo Carp

NPB statistics (through 2016 season)
- Batting average: .273
- Hits: 595
- Home runs: 51
- RBIs: 253
- Stolen Bases: 19

Teams
- As player: Hiroshima Toyo Carp (2001–2016); As coach: Hiroshima Toyo Carp (2018–)

Career highlights and awards
- 2010 Central League Golden Glove Award; 2× NPB All-Star (2010, 2013)

Jun Hirose (廣瀬 純, Hirose Jun, born March 29, 1979) is a former professional Japanese baseball player. He played as an outfielder for the Hiroshima Toyo Carp.
