= Masato Akamatsu =

Japanese baseball player (born 1982)

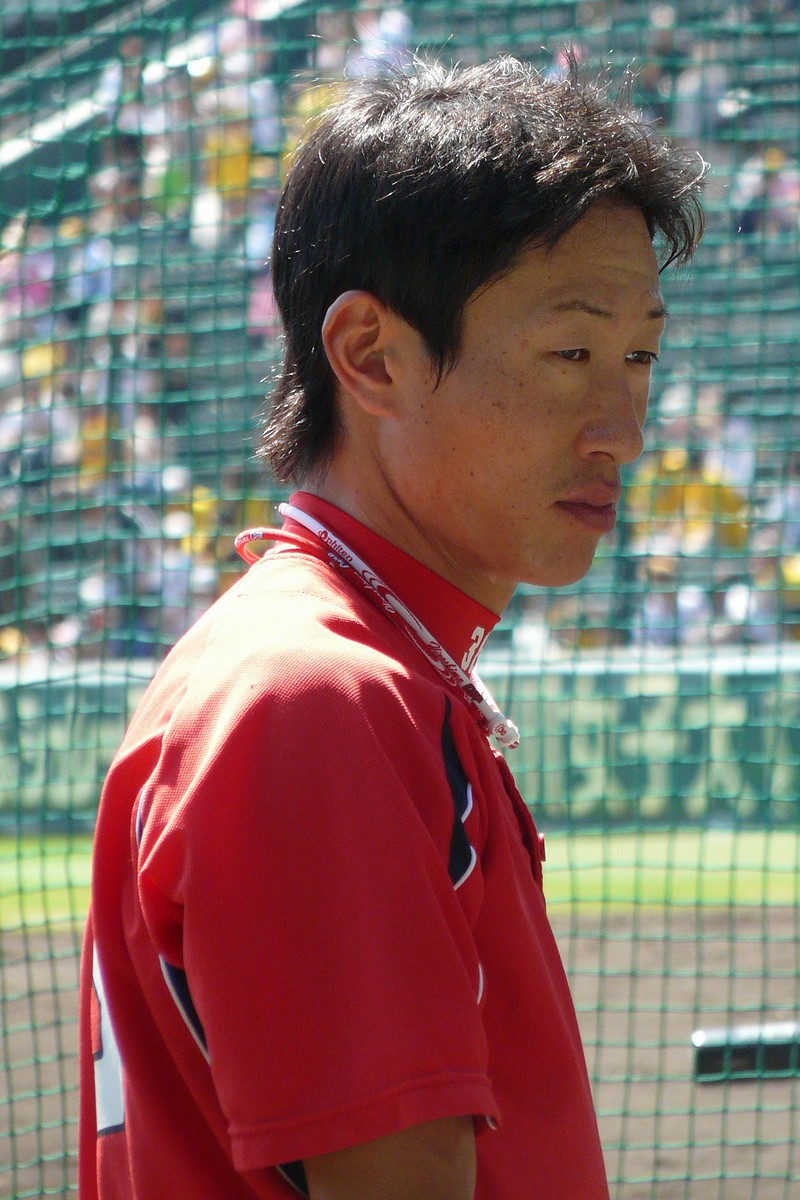
- Akamatsu with the Hiroshima Toyo Carp

Hiroshima Toyo Carp – No. 80
- Outfielder / Coach
- Born: September 6, 1982 (age 44); Kyoto, Japan
- Bats: Right Throws: Right

NPB debut
- October 4, 2005, for the Hanshin Tigers

Career statistics (through 2016 season)
- Batting average: .249
- RBIs: 144
- Home runs: 21
- Stats at Baseball Reference

Teams
- As player: Hanshin Tigers (2005–2007); Hiroshima Toyo Carp (2008–2016, 2019); As coach: Hiroshima Carp (2020–present)

Career highlights and awards
- 1× Central League Golden Glove Award (2010); 1× NPB All-Star (2009)

Masato Akamatsu (赤松 真人, Akamatsu Masato; born September 6, 1982, in Fushimi Ward, Kyoto City) is a Nippon Professional Baseball player. He is currently with the Hiroshima Toyo Carp.

In August 2010, Masato made sports headlines by denying batter Shuichi Murata a home run with what sportswriters dubbed the "Spider-Man Catch," rapidly scaling the outfield fence before snaring the ball in midleap. He won the Gold Glove that same year.
