= Takahiro Iwamoto =

Japanese baseball player (born 1986)

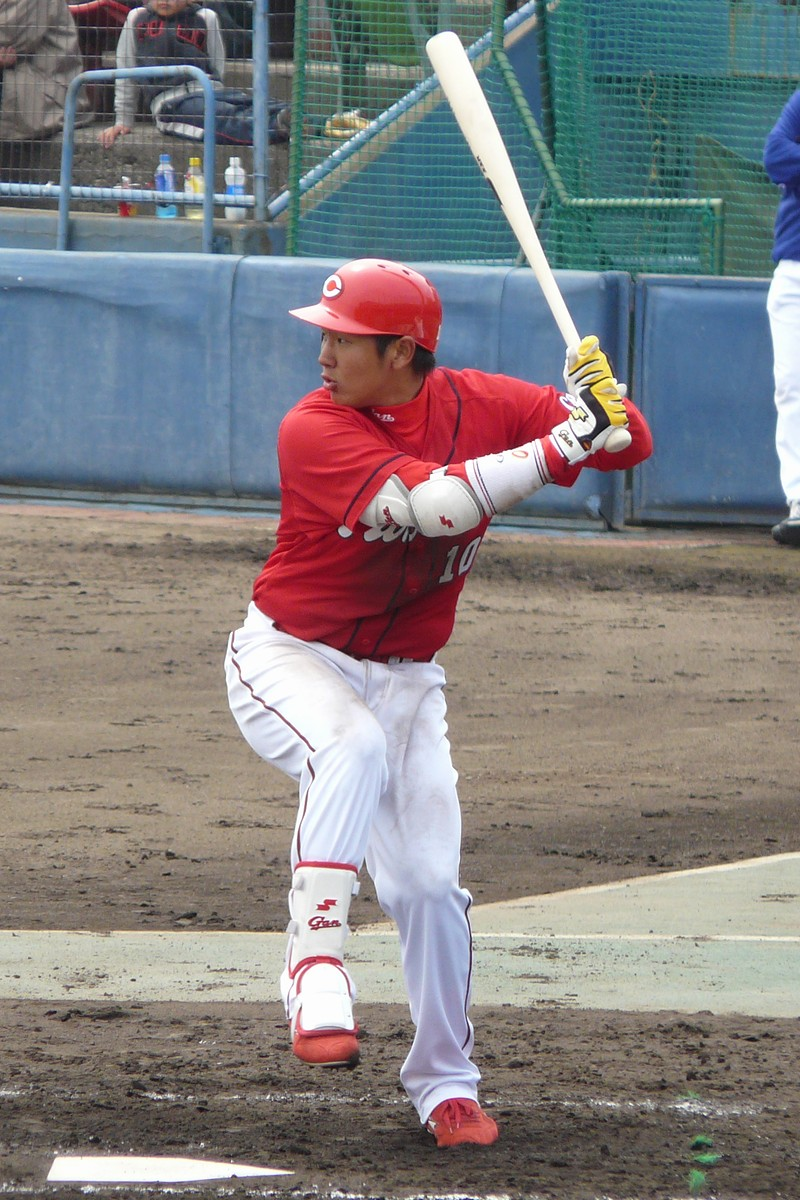
- Iwamoto with the Hiroshima Toyo Carp
- Outfielder / First baseman
- Born: April 18, 1986 (age 39); Hiroshima, Hiroshima, Japan
- Bats: Left Throws: Left

debut
- May 28, 2009, for the Hiroshima Toyo Carp

NPB statistics (through 2018 season)
- Batting average: .254
- Home runs: 31
- Runs batted in: 131
- Stats at Baseball Reference

Teams
- Hiroshima Toyo Carp (2009–2019)

Takahiro Iwamoto (岩本 貴裕, Iwamoto Takahiro; born April 18, 1986 in Hiroshima, Hiroshima, Japan) is a professional Japanese baseball player. He plays outfielder for the Hiroshima Toyo Carp.
