= Jiun Aoki =

Jiun Aoki (青木 慈雲, Aoki Jiun; February 1929 – April 11, 1998) was a Japanese Buddhist monk and artist. He served as head priest at Daihon-zan Myōson-ji (大本山妙尊寺) in Mie Prefecture, Sōhon-zan Ryūkaku-ji (総本山龍覚寺) in Yamanashi Prefecture, and Myōkai-ji (妙海寺) in Yamaguchi Prefecture.

== Early life ==
Jiun Aoki was born in Yokohama, Kanagawa Prefecture. In 1943, he attended Kiyomizu Nautical College (清水高等商船学校) where he graduated from the Department of Navigation.

In 1953, Aoki entered Musashino Art University, where he graduated from the Department of Painting five years later.

He devoted himself to studying Buddhism and philosophy of religion overseas and received his doctorate of Religious Philosophy at Honolulu University.
