= Kenjiro Nomura (baseball) =

Japanese baseball player (born 1966)

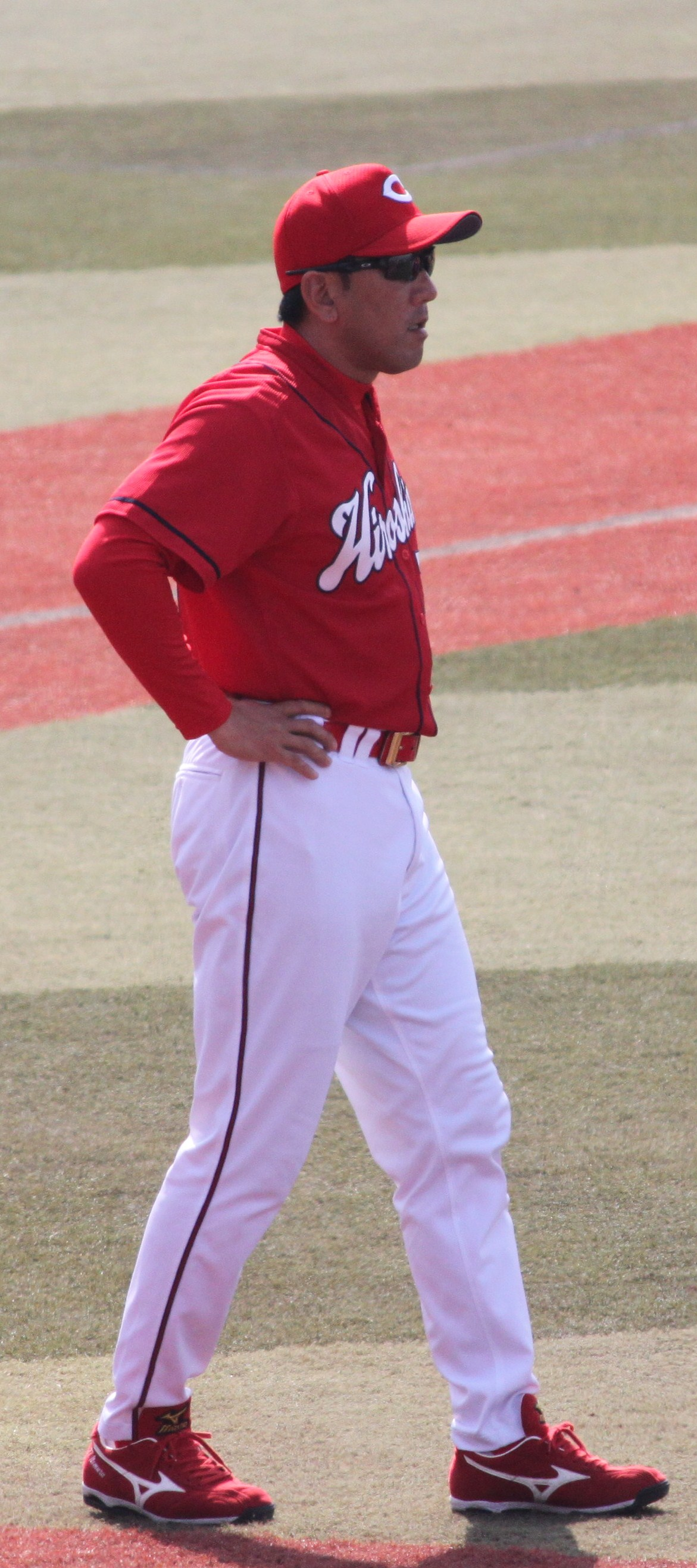
- Manager / Infielder
- Born: September 19, 1966 (age 59); Saiki, Ōita, Japan
- Batted: Left Threw: Right

NPB debut
- April 9, 1989, for the Hiroshima Toyo Carp

Last NPB appearance
- October 12, 2005, for the Hiroshima Toyo Carp

NBP statistics
- Batting average: .285
- Hits: 2020
- Runs batted in: 765
- Stolen Bases: 250
- Home runs: 169
- Stats at Baseball Reference

Teams
- As player: Hiroshima Toyo Carp (1989–2005); As manager: Hiroshima Toyo Carp (2010–2014)

Career highlights and awards
- 3x Central League Batting Champion (1991, 1994, 1995); 3x Central League Stolen Base Champion (1990, 1991, 1994); 3x Central League Best Nine Award (1991, 1995, 1996); Central League Mitsui Golden Glove Award (1995); 2x JCB, MEP Award (1994, 1995); IBM Players of the Year (1995); Triple Three (1995); 8x NPB All-Star (1990, 1991, 1993–1998)); Central League Chairman's Award (2005)
Medals
Men's baseball
Representing Japan
Olympic Games
Silver medal – second place	1988 Seoul	Team
Asian Baseball Championship
Silver medal – second place	1999 Seoul	Team

Kenjiro Nomura (野村 謙二郎, Nomura Kenjirō; born September 19, 1966) is a retired Japanese baseball player. He was with the Hiroshima Toyo Carp of Japan's Central League.

He was born in Saiki, Ōita.

He led his team into League Champion (1991).

His number #7, one of the Honored Numbers of Hiroshima Carp.

== Career ==
- 1st play on April 9, 1989.
- 1st stolen base on April 12, 1989.
- 1st hit on May 4, 1989.
- 1st RBI on May 4, 1989.
- 1st home run on April 15, 1990.
- Greatest number of Hits (1994 and 1995).
- SB Award winner (1990, 1991 and 1994).
- Best nine of the year (1991, 1995 and 1996).
- Golden Glove Award winner (1995).
- 169 HR, 765 RBI, 2020 H, 250 SB.
- Last game on October 12, 2005.
- Hiroshima Prefectural Prize of Honour (2005).

=== Statistics ===
Year	Team	No.	GP	AB	R	H	2H	3H	HR	RBI	TB	BB	SB	K	BA	Titles
1989	Hiroshima	7	88	151	29	39	4	5	0	12	53	10	21	21	.258	
1990	Hiroshima	7	125	519	84	149	28	8	16	44	241	54	33	83	.287	SB Award winner
1991	Hiroshima	7	132	524	75	170	22	7	10	66	236	38	31	62	.324	SB Award winner, Best Nine Award, League Champion
1992	Hiroshima	7	130	545	89	157	22	5	14	63	231	61	21	73	.288	
1993	Hiroshima	7	130	556	67	148	21	1	14	48	213	44	12	83	.266	
1994	Hiroshima	7	130	558	77	169	20	4	10	61	227	49	37	75	.303	Greatest number of Hits, SB Award winner
1995	Hiroshima	7	131	550	109	173	29	5	32	75	308	59	30	60	.315	Greatest number of Hits, Gold Glove Award winner, Best Nine Award
1996	Hiroshima	7	124	514	77	150	30	3	12	68	222	43	8	63	.292	Best Nine Award
1997	Hiroshima	7	131	540	81	151	25	0	13	52	215	59	26	68	.280	
1998	Hiroshima	7	135	561	75	158	26	4	14	49	234	44	15	63	.282	
1999	Hiroshima	7	101	350	37	102	20	1	6	42	142	35	2	34	.291	
2000	Hiroshima	7	61	208	15	50	4	1	2	17	62	18	1	22	.240	
2001	Hiroshima	7	117	403	35	110	18	1	9	53	157	31	7	59	.273	
2002	Hiroshima	7	85	175	14	37	4	0	3	11	50	9	1	33	.211	
2003	Hiroshima	7	94	310	25	85	8	0	5	32	108	28	3	49	.274	
2004	Hiroshima	7	107	359	27	97	18	2	5	43	134	27	1	48	.270	
2005	Hiroshima	7	106	272	19	75	14	0	4	29	101	19	1	42	.276	
TOTALS		-	1927	7095	935	2020	313	47	169	765	2934	628	250	938	.285	-

- Kansas City Royals

On August 12, 2016, Kenjiro became a special advisor to the Kansas City Royals baseball operations.

== See also ==
- List of Nippon Professional Baseball career hits leaders
