= Hiroki Ueno (baseball) =

Japanese baseball player

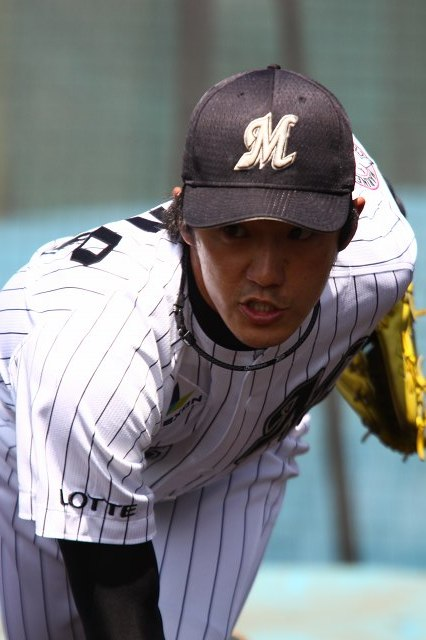
- Ueno with the Chiba Lotte Marines
- Pitcher
- Born: October 13, 1986 (age 39)
- Bats: Right Throws: Right

NPB debut
- 2009, for the Chiba Lotte Marines

NPB statistics (through 2015)
- Win–loss record: 11–10
- ERA: 3.64
- Strikeouts: 144
- Stats at Baseball Reference

Teams
- Chiba Lotte Marines (2009–2015)

Hiroki Ueno (上野 大樹, born October 13, 1986) is a Japanese former professional baseball pitcher. He played for the Chiba Lotte Marines in Japan's Nippon Professional Baseball from 2009 to 2015.
