= Takahiro Aoki =

Japanese baseball player

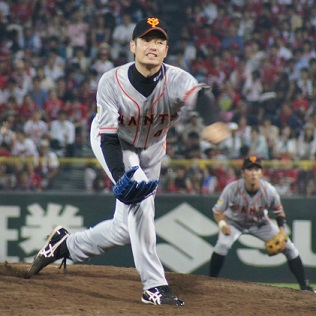
- Aoki with the Yomiuri Giants
- Pitcher / Coach
- Born: November 26, 1981 (age 44); Gifu, Japan
- Bats: Left Throws: Left

debut
- March 31, 2007, for the Hiroshima Toyo Carp

Career statistics (through 2014)
- Win–loss record: 17-30
- Earned run average: 4.56
- Strikeouts: 285
- WHIP: 1.343
- Stats at Baseball Reference

Teams
- As player: Hiroshima Toyo Carp (2007 – 2011); Yomiuri Giants (2013 – 2014); As coach: Yomiuri Giants (2021 - 2023)

Takahiro Aoki (青木 高広, Aoki Takahiro; born November 26, 1981 in Gifu, Japan) is a Nippon Professional Baseball player. He is currently with the Yomiuri Giants of Japan's Central League.
