= Sohichiro Amaya =

Japanese baseball player (born 1983)

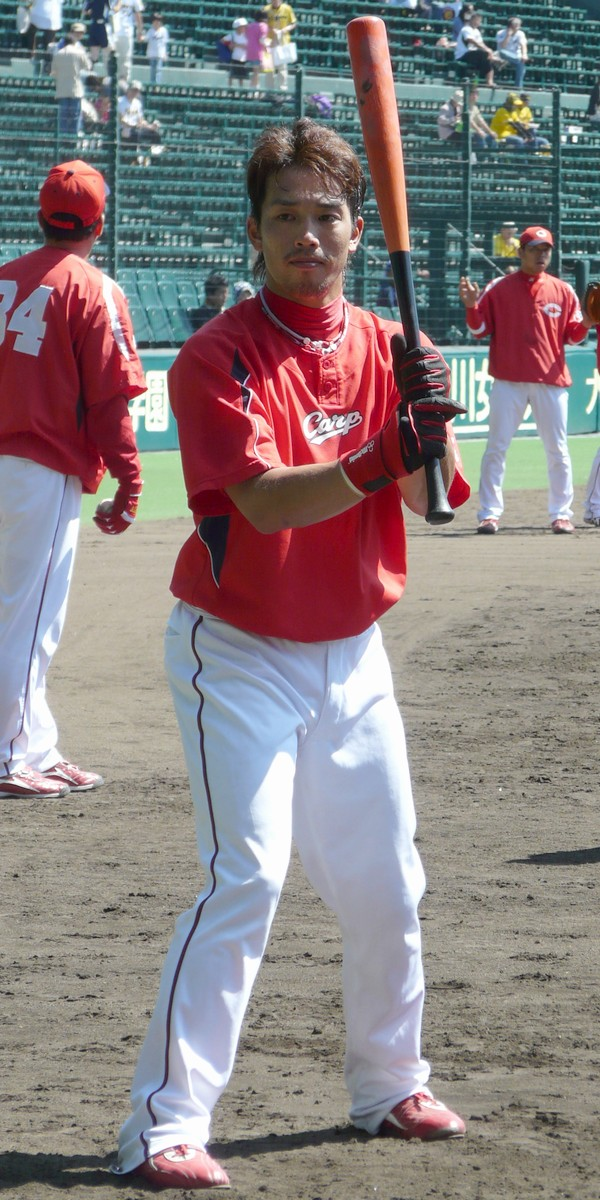
- Amaya with the Hiroshima Toyo Carp
- Outfielder
- Born: November 8, 1983 (age 42); Fukui, Japan
- Bats: Left Throws: Left

NPB debut
- August 20, 2004, for the Hiroshima Toyo Carp

NPB statistics (through 2018 season)
- Batting average: .255
- Home runs: 27
- Runs batted in: 159
- Stats at Baseball Reference

Teams
- Hiroshima Toyo Carp (2002–2018)

Sohichiro Amaya (天谷 宗一郎, Amaya Sohichiro; born November 8, 1983 in Fukui, Japan) is a Nippon Professional Baseball player. He is currently with the Hiroshima Toyo Carp of Japan's Central League.
