= List of Nippon Professional Baseball players (A) =

Japanese professional baseball players

The following is a list of Nippon Professional Baseball players with the last name starting with A, retired or active.

== A ==
Name	Debut	Final Game	Position	Teams	Ref
Andy Abad	2000	2000	Outfielder	Osaka Kintetsu Buffaloes	
Kenta Abe	August 26, 2003		Pitcher	Osaka Kintetsu Buffaloes, Orix Buffaloes, Hanshin Tigers	
Masahiro Abe	March 24, 2001		Infielder	Osaka Kintetsu Buffaloes, Orix Buffaloes	
Osamu Abe	May 11, 1984	September 23, 1999	Outfielder	Seibu Lions, Osaka Kintetsu Buffaloes	
Shigeki Abe	1991	2001	Catcher	Yomiuri Giants, Yakult Swallows	
Shinnosuke Abe	2001		Catcher	Yomiuri Giants	
Winston Abreu	2008	2008	Pitcher	Chiba Lotte Marines	
Mark Acre	May 5, 1998	September 5, 1998	Pitcher	Yakult Swallows	
Toshiya Adachi	1984	1996	Infielder	Kintetsu Buffaloes	
Benny Agbayani	March 27, 2004		Outfielder	Chiba Lotte Marines	
Yushi Aida	April 1, 2007		Pitcher	Yomiuri Giants	
Katsuyuki Aihara	2006		Pitcher	Chiba Lotte Marines	
Ryota Aikawa	September 16, 1999		Outfielder	Orix BlueWave, Orix Buffaloes	
Ryoji Aikawa	August 21, 1999		Catcher	Yokohama BayStars, Tokyo Yakult Swallows	
Takashi Aiki	July 21, 2002		Pitcher	Orix BlueWave, Orix Buffaloes, Hanshin Tigers	
Takeshi Aikoh	April 6, 1981	2000	Infielder	Lotte Orions, Chiba Lotte Marines, Chunichi Dragons	
Hisashi Aikyoh	March 27, 2001		Pitcher	Osaka Kintetsu Buffaloes, Tohoku Rakuten Golden Eagles	
Shogo Akada	August 20, 1999		Outfielder	Seibu Lions, Saitama Seibu Lions	
Motoyuki Akahori	May 3, 1989	2004	Pitcher	Kintetsu Buffaloes, Osaka Kintetsu Buffaloes	
Norihiro Akahoshi	March 30, 2001		Outfielder	Hanshin Tigers	
Masato Akamatsu	October 4, 2005		Outfielder	Hanshin Tigers, Hiroshima Toyo Carp	
Kazuyuki Akasaka	June 1, 2008		Pitcher	Chunichi Dragons	
Kenji Akashi	May 2, 2004		Infielder	Fukuoka Daiei Hawks, Fukuoka SoftBank Hawks	
Kosaku Akimoto	April 25, 1990	2000	Catcher	Seibu Lions, Yokohama Taiyo Whales, Yokohama BayStars	
Norihiro Akimura	April 7, 1990	1996	Pitcher	Hiroshima Toyo Carp, Nippon Ham Fighters	
Koji Akiyama	September 29, 1981	October 6, 2002	Outfielder, Third baseman	Seibu Lions, Fukuoka Daiei Hawks	
Noboru Akiyama	March 21, 1956	1967	Pitcher	Taiyo Whales	
Kokichi Akune	1999	2004	Infielder	Nippon Ham Fighters	
Takeo Akuta				Kintetsu Pearls	
Chad Allen	2007	2007	Outfielder	Orix Buffaloes	
Erick Almonte	2005	2005	Infielder	Hokkaido Nippon Ham Fighters	
Héctor Almonte	2001	2002	Pitcher	Yomiuri Giants	
Shunichi Amachi					
Kohichi Amano	August 7, 2002	September 10, 2005	Pitcher	Hiroshima Toyo Carp	
Yugoh Amano			Infielder	Chiba Lotte Marines	
Sohichiro Amaya	August 20, 2004		Outfielder	Hiroshima Toyo Carp	
Yoshio Anabuki					
Junro Anan					
Manabu Andoh					
Masanori Andoh					
Motoo Andoh					
Shinji Andoh					
Shinobu Andoh					
Yuya Ando	April 7, 2002		Pitcher	Hanshin Tigers	
Hayato Aoki			Pitcher	Seibu Lions, Hiroshima Toyo Carp	
Kazuyoshi Aoki					
Norichika Aoki	July 17, 2004		Outfielder	Yakult Swallows, Tokyo Yakult Swallows	
Takahiro Aoki					
Tomoshi Aoki					
Keiyo Aomatsu					
Takeshi Aono					
Noboru Aota					
Susumu Aoyagi					
Koji Aoyama					
Luis Aquino	1996	1996	Pitcher	Kintetsu Buffaloes	
Kiyoshi Arai					
Nobuaki Arai					
Ryohji Arai					
Ryota Arai					
Satoshi Arai					
Shogo Arai					
Takahide Arai					
Takahiro Arai	April 3, 1999		Infielder	Hiroshima Toyo Carp, Hanshin Tigers	
Yukio Arai					
Tatsuya Araidai					
Nagisa Arakaki	March 31, 2003		Pitcher	Fukuoka Daiei Hawks, Fukuoka SoftBank Hawks	
Hisao Arakane					
Hiroshi Arakawa					
Yuta Arakawa					
Daisuke Araki					
Masahiro Araki	May 31, 1997		Second baseman	Chunichi Dragons	
Atsushi Aramaki					
George Arias	2000	2006	Infielder	Orix BlueWave, Hanshin Tigers, Yomiuri Giants	
Masashi Arikura					
Giichi Arima					
Kanehisa Arime					
Michiyo Arito					
Hideki Asai					
Itsuki Asai					
Ryo Asai					
Kenta Asakura					
Keita Asama					
Tomoharu Asano					
Toshinori Asanuma					
Takuya Asao					
Toyo Asayama					
Yutaka Ashikaga					
Akira Ashizawa					
Scott Atchison	April 1, 2008		Pitcher	Hanshin Tigers	
Kazuyuki Atsuzawa	May 14, 1995	2003	Pitcher	Nippon Ham Fighters/Hokkaido Nippon Ham Fighters	
Hideyuki Awano	April 12, 1987	October 7, 2000	Pitcher	Kintetsu Buffaloes, Yomiuri Giants, Yokohama BayStars	
Yoshifumi Ayukawa	June 13, 1990	2000	Infielder	Hanshin Tigers, Chiba Lotte Marines	
Kazumasa Azuma	August 17, 2001	July 4, 2006	Pitcher	Yokohama BayStars, Seibu Lions/Saitama Seibu Lions	
Kohtaro Azuse	August 8, 1990	August 18, 2000	Pitcher	Yokohama Taiyo Whales, Chiba Lotte Marines, Hiroshima Toyo Carp, Chunichi Dragons, Osaka Kintetsu Buffaloes	
