= Andō =

Andō, Ando, Andou or Andoh (written: 安藤 or 安東) is a Japanese surname. Notable people with the surname include:

- Aika Ando (安藤 あいか; born 1984), Japanese gravure idol and professional wrestler
- Akira Ando (安東 輝; born 1995), Japanese footballer
- Albert Ando (1929–2002), Japanese-born American economist
- Andō Chikasue (安東 愛季; 1539–1587), Japanese daimyō
- Arisa Andō (安藤 ありさ; born 1961), Japanese voice actress
- Asa Ando (安藤 麻; born 1996), Japanese alpine skier
- Eiko Ando (安藤 永子; 1934–2018), Japanese actress
- Hiroshi Ando (安藤 尋; born 1965), Japanese screenwriter and film director
- Jiro Ando (安藤 慈朗), Japanese manga artist
- Ando Jubei, cloisonné artist
- Jun Ando (安藤 淳; born 1984), Japanese footballer
- Kazu Ando (安藤 和津; born 1948), Japanese writer and television personality
- Kazuaki Ando (安藤 和明; born 1967), Japanese freestyle skier
- Kenkichi Ando (安藤 謙吉; born 1950), Japanese weightlifter
- Kisaburō Andō (安藤 紀三郎; 1874–1954), Japanese general and wartime Home Minister
- Andō Kiyosue (安東 舜季; 1514–1553), Japanese daimyō
- Koki Ando (安藤 宏基; born 1947), Japanese businessman
- Kozō Andō (安藤 宏三; 1940–2003), Japanese Kendo teacher
- Kozue Ando (安藤 梢; born 1982), Japanese women's footballer
- Kunitake Andō (安藤 国威; born 1942), Japanese businessman, former president of Sony
- Manabu Andoh (安藤 学; born 1967), Japanese baseball player
- Masahiro Ando (footballer) (安藤 正裕; born 1972), Japanese footballer
- Masahiro Andoh (安藤 正容; born 1954), Japanese composer and guitarist
- Masanobu Andō (安藤 政信; born 1975), Japanese actor and film director
- Masashi Ando (安藤 雅司; born 1969), Japanese animator and character designer
- Masaya Ando (安藤 正哉; born 1960), Japanese sport wrestler
- Miki Ando (安藤 美姫; born 1987), Japanese figure skater
- Mikiko Ando (安藤 美希子; born 1992), Japanese weightlifter
- Minami Ando (安藤 みなみ; born 1997), Japanese table tennis player
- Misako Ando (安藤 美佐子; born 1971), Japanese softball player
- Miya Ando, American artist
- Momofuku Ando (安藤 百福; 1910–2007), Japanese inventor and founder of Nissin Foods
- Momoko Ando (安藤 桃子; born 1982), Japanese film director
- Andō Morinari (安藤 守就; 1503–1582), Japanese samurai
- Motoo Andoh (安藤 統男; born 1939), Japanese baseball player
- Naoto Ando (安藤 由翔; born 1991), Japanese footballer
- Natsu Ando (安藤 なつ; born 1981), Japanese comedian
- Natsumi Ando (安藤 なつみ), Japanese manga artist
- Noboru Ando (安藤 昇; 1926–2015), Japanese actor and former yakuza
- Andō Nobumasa (安藤 信正; 1819–1871), Japanese daimyō
- Rikichi Andō (安藤 利吉; 1884–1946), Imperial Japanese general and Governor-General of Taiwan
- Sakura Ando (安藤 サクラ; born 1986), Japanese actress
- Sakura Andō (idol) (安藤 咲桜; born 2001), Japanese idol
- Sayaka Ando (安藤 沙耶香; born 1981), Japanese gravure idol and model
- Seiya Ando (安藤 誓哉; born 1992), Japanese basketball player
- Shinji Ando (安藤 真児), Japanese baseball player
- Shinobu Ando (安藤 忍; 1895–1970), Japanese baseball player
- Ando Shoeki (安藤 昌益; 1703–1762), Japanese philosopher
- Shunsuke Andō (安藤 駿介; born 1990), Japanese footballer
- Shuto Ando (born 1994) Japanese basketball player
- Tadahiro Ando (安藤 忠恕; 1941–2010), Japanese politician
- Tadao Ando (安藤 忠雄; born 1941), Japanese architect
- Taiyo Ando (安藤 泰洋; born 1987), Japanese rugby union player
- Takeo Ando (安藤 武夫; born 1938), Japanese Go player
- Taro Ando (安藤 太郎; born 1977), Japanese slalom canoeist
- Andō Teibi (安東 貞美; 1853–1932), also known as Andō Sadayoshi, Imperial Japanese general and Governor-General of Taiwan
- Teru Ando (安東 輝; born 1995), Japanese footballer who plays for AC Nagano Parceiro
- Tomoyasu Ando (安藤 智安; born 1974), Japanese footballer
- Toshiyuki Ando (安藤 俊行; born 1948), Japanese Go player
- Tsuneo Ando (born 1956), Japanese aikidoka
- Umeko Ando (安東 ウメ子; 1932–2004), Japanese Ainu singer and musician
- Yasuhiro Ando (安藤 康洋; born 1969), Japanese cyclist
- Yuka Ando (安藤 友香; born 1994), Japanese long-distance runner
- Yūko Andō (news anchor) (安藤 優子; born 1958), Japanese news anchor
- Yūko Andō (singer) (安藤 裕子; born 1977), Japanese singer-songwriter
- Yuya Ando (安藤 優也; born 1977), Japanese baseball player

== Other people ==
- Antonio Ando (born 1914), Argentine sport shooter
- Clifford Ando (born 1969), American classicist
- Elreen Ando (born 1998), Filipino weightlifter

== Fictional characters ==
- Ando Masahashi, a character from the television series Heroes
- Mahoro Andou (安藤 まほろ), assumed name of the title character in the manga and anime series Mahoromatic
- Andō Rena (安藤レナ), a minor character in the anime film series Girls und Panzer das Finale
- Ringo Andou (あんどうりんご), a main character from the video game series Puyo Puyo
- Ruruka Ando, a character from Danganronpa
- Tsubasa Andō (安藤 翼), a character in the manga series Gakuen Alice
- Tazusa Andou (安藤 鶴紗), a character from the anime series Assault Lily

== See also ==
- Andō clan, a Japanese samurai clan
