= Arai (surname) =

Arai (written: 新井 or 荒井) is a Japanese surname.

"新井" means "new well.” "荒井" means "well in the wilderness".

Notable people with the surname include:

- Akino Arai (新居 昭乃; born 1959), Japanese singer and lyricist
- Alberto Arai (1915–1955), Mexican architect and writer
- Atsushi Arai (荒井 陸; born 1994), Japanese water polo player
- Etsuji Arai (新井 悦二; born 1957), Japanese politician, younger brother of Iemitsu Arai
- Hakuseki Arai (新井 白石; 1657–1725), Japanese scholar and politician
- Haruhiko Arai (荒井 晴彦; born 1947), Japanese screenwriter
- Hideki Arai (新井 英樹; born 1963), Japanese manga artist
- Hirofumi Arai (新井 浩文; born 1979), Japanese actor
- Hiroyuki Arai (荒井 広幸; born 1958), Japanese politician
- Iemitsu Arai (新井 家光; born 1955), Japanese politician, older brother of Etsuji Arai
- Ikunosuke Arai (荒井 郁之助; 1836–1909), Japanese samurai
- Izumi Arai (新井 泉) (born 1964), birthname of Japanese singer and actress Minami Takayama (高山 みなみ)
- Jo Arai (新井 丈) (born 1998), Japanese mixed martial artist
- Kenichiro Arai (新井 健一郎; born 1972), Japanese male professional wrestler
- Kenji Arai (新井 健二; born 1978), Japanese football player
- Kikuo Arai (新井 規矩雄; born 1943), Japanese male golfer
- Kiyoko Arai (あらい きよこ), Japanese manga artist
- Kozo Arai (荒井 公三; born 1950), Japanese retired football player
- Maki Arai (新井 麻葵; born 1982), Japanese women's tennis player
- Mao Arai (新井 万央; born 2003), Japanese judoka
- Marie Arai (荒井 万里絵; born 1981), Japanese female pair skater
- Masao Arai (荒井 政雄; 1949–2024), Japanese male wrestler
- Masaru Arai (新井 優; born 1952), Japanese astronomer
- Matsuri Arai (荒井 祭里; born 2001), Japanese diver
- Motoko Arai (新井 素子; born 1960), Japanese science fiction writer
- Nanao Arai (荒井 菜々緒; born 1998), Japanese model and actress
- Naoto Arai (新井 直人; born 1996), Japanese footballer
- Nobuaki Arai (荒井 修光; born 1973), Japanese baseball player
- Nobuo Arai (新井 信男; 1909–1990), Japanese male freestyle swimmer
- Noriko Arai (荒井 のり子; born 1973), Japanese female wheelchair racer
- Noriko H. Arai (新井 紀子; born 1962), Japanese mathematical logician and artificial intelligence researcher
- Ryohei Arai (disambiguation), multiple people
- Arai Ryoichiro (新井 領一郎; 1855–1939), Japanese businessman
- Ryōji Arai (荒井 良二; born 1956), Japanese illustrator
- Ryota Arai (新井 良太; born 1983), Japanese baseball player
- Sasagu Arai (荒井 献; 1930–2024), Japanese Biblical scholar
- Satomi Arai (新井 里美; born 1980), Japanese voice actress
- Satoshi Arai (荒井 聰; born 1946), Japanese politician
- Shigeo Arai (新井 茂雄; 1916–1944), Japanese male freestyle swimmer
- Shōgo Arai (荒井 正吾; born 1945), Japanese politician
- Shota Arai (disambiguation), multiple people
- Shoichi Arai (荒井 昌一; 1965–2002), Japanese professional wrestler promoter
- Takahiro Arai (新井 貴浩; born 1977), Japanese baseball player
- Takako Arai (新井 貴子; born 1990), Japanese beauty pageant contestant
- Tatsunori Arai (新居 辰基; born 1983), Japanese football player
- Tatsuo Arai (長井 研究室), Japanese engineer
- Tatsuya Arai (新井 辰也; born 1988), Japanese football player
- Toshi Arai (新井 敏弘; born 1966), Japanese rally driver and team owner
- Yuko Arai (新井 祐子, born 1973), Japanese female fencer
- Yumi Arai (荒井 由実) (born 1954), birthname of Japanese musician Yumi Matsutoya (松任谷 由実)
- Zack Arai, Japanese adult video director
