= Ashikaga =

Ashikaga (足利) may refer to:

== People ==
- Ashikaga clan (足利氏 Ashikaga-shi), a Japanese samurai clan descended from the Minamoto clan; and that formed the basis of the eponymous shogunate
  - Ashikaga shogunate (足利幕府 Ashikaga bakufu), a Japanese shōgun dynasty
    - Ashikaga era (足利時代 Ashikaga jidai), a period of Japanese history related to the eponymous dynasty
- Ashikaga clan (Fujiwara) (足利氏 Ashikaga-shi), a Japanese samurai clan descended from the Fujiwara clan
- Ashikaga Domain (足利藩, Ashikaga-han) a feudal domain under the Tokugawa shogunate of Edo period Japan
- Ashikaga Masatomo (足利 政知; 1435–1491), Japanese warrior of the Muromachi period and member of the Ashikaga family
- Ashikaga Mitsukane (足利 満兼; 1378–1409), Nanboku-chō period warrior, and the Kamakura-fu's third Kantō kubō
- Ashikaga Mochiuji (足利 持氏; 1398–1439), the Kamakura-fu's fourth Kantō kubō during the Muromachi period
- Ashikaga Motouji (足利 基氏; 1340–1367), Japanese samurai lord of the Nanboku-chō period
- Ashikaga Satouji (足利 聡氏; 1857-1921), Japanese samurai of the late Edo period
- Ashikaga Shigeuji (足利 成氏; 1438–1497), Muromachi period warrior and the Kamakura-fu's fifth and last Kantō kubō
- Ashikaga Tadayoshi (足利 直義; 1306–1352), Japanese general of the Northern and Southern Courts period
- Ashikaga Takauji (足利 尊氏; 1305–1358), Japanese samurai, daimyo and the founder of the Ashikaga shogunate
- Ashikaga Ujimitsu (足利 氏満; 1359–1398), Nanboku-chō period warrior and the Kamakura-fu's second Kantō kubō
- Ashikaga Ujinohime (足利 氏姫; 1574–1620), the de facto Koga kubō in Sengoku period
- Ashikaga Yoshiaki (足利 義昭; 1537–1597), Japanese samurai, daimyo and the final shōgun of the Ashikaga shogunate
- Ashikaga Yoshiakira (足利 義詮; 1330–1367), the second shōgun of the Ashikaga shogunate
- Ashikaga Yoshiharu (足利 義晴; 1511–1550), the twelfth shōgun of the Ashikaga shogunate
- Ashikaga Yoshihide (足利 義栄; 1538–1568), the 14th shōgun of the Ashikaga shogunate
- Ashikaga Yoshihisa (足利 義尚; 1465–1489), the 9th shōgun of the Ashikaga shogunate
- Ashikaga Yoshikane (足利 義兼; 1154–1199), Japanese samurai military commander, feudal lord in the late Heian
- Ashikaga Yoshikatsu (足利 義勝; 1434–1443), the seventh shōgun of the Ashikaga shogunate
- Ashikaga Yoshikazu (足利 義量; 1407–1425), the fifth shōgun of the Ashikaga shogunate
- Ashikaga Yoshimasa (足利 義政; 1436–1490), the eighth shōgun of the Ashikaga shogunate
- Ashikaga Yoshimi (足利 義視; 1439–1491), the brother of Shōgun Ashikaga Yoshimasa
- Ashikaga Yoshimitsu (足利 義満; 1358–1408), the third shōgun of the Ashikaga shogunate
- Ashikaga Yoshimochi (足利 義持; 1386–1428), the fourth shōgun of the Ashikaga shogunate
- Ashikaga Yoshinori (足利 義教; 1394–1441), the sixth shōgun of the Ashikaga shogunate
- Ashikaga Yoshitane (足利 義稙; 1466–1523), the 10th shōgun of the Ashikaga shogunate
- Ashikaga Yoshiteru (足利 義輝; 1536–1565), Japanese samurai, daimyo and the 13th shōgun of the Ashikaga shogunate
- Ashikaga Yoshitsuna (足利 義維; 1509–1573), Japanese samurai of the Ashikaga clan
- Ashikaga Yoshizumi (足利 義澄; 1481–1511), the 11th shōgun of the Ashikaga shogunate
- Michio Ashikaga (足利 道夫; born 1950), Japanese former football player
- Yutaka Ashikaga (足利 豊; born 1968), Japanese former professional baseball pitcher

== Places ==
- Ashikaga, Tochigi (足利市 Ashikaga-shi), a city in Japan
  - Ashikaga Athletic Stadium, an athletic stadium in Ashikaga, Tochigi, Japan.
  - Ashikaga District, Tochigi (足利郡), a former district located in Tochigi
  - Ashikaga Flower Park Station, a railway station on the Ryōmō Line in Ashikaga, Tochigi, Japan
  - Ashikaga Gakkō, is Japan's oldest standing academic building
  - Ashikaga Institute of Technology (足利工業大学 Ashikaga kogyō daigaku), a school in the city of Ashikaga
  - Ashikaga Junior College (足利短期大学 Ashikaga tanki daigaku), a school in the city of Ashikaga
  - Ashikaga Station (足利駅 Ashikaga eki), a train station in the city of Ashikaga
  - Ashikaga murder case, a murder case that occurred in the city of Ashikaga

== See also ==
- Northern Court or Ashikaga Pretenders, pretenders to the Japanese imperial throne during the Ashikaga shogunate
