= Ayukawa =

Ayukawa (鮎川) ("freshwater trout river") is a Japanese surname and place name.

== People ==
- Yoshisuke Aikawa (鮎川 義介, 1880–1967), or Gisuke Ayukawa, entrepreneur, businessman, and politician
- Makoto Ayukawa (鮎川 誠, 1948–2023), guitarist, composer, member of the Japanese rock band Sheena & The Rokkets
- Mami Ayukawa (鮎川 麻弥, born 1961), singer-songwriter
- Tetsuya Ayukawa (鮎川 哲也, 1919–2002), mystery fiction writer
- Yoshifumi Ayukawa (鮎川 義文, born 1970), baseball player

== Places ==
- Ayukawa, a whaling port in Miyagi prefecture, now a part of Ishinomaki.

== Fictional characters ==
- Emi Ayukawa / Fonda Fontaine, from the anime series, Yu-Gi-Oh! GX
- Hitomi Ayukawa, from the Japanese PC erotic game, Miko Miko Nurse
- Madoka Ayukawa, from the manga/anime series, Kimagure Orange Road
- Tenri Ayukawa, from the manga/anime series, The World God Only Knows
- Keita Ayukawa, from the visual novel, Atlach-Nacha
- Ran Ayukawa / B-Fighter Tentou, from the Tokusatsu TV series, B-Fighter Kabuto
- Ryuji "Yuka" Ayukawa (鮎川龍二, Ayukawa Ryuji), from the manga/anime series, Blue Period
