= Arakawa (surname) =

Arakawa (written: 荒川) is a Japanese surname. Notable people with the surname include:

- Adele Arakawa (born 1958), American evening news anchor
- Akio Arakawa (1927–2021), Japanese-born American climate scientist
- Alan Arakawa (born 1951), American local politician, mayor of Maui, Hawaii
- Betsy Arakawa (1959–2025), American classical pianist
- Daisuke Arakawa (荒川 大輔; born 1981), Japanese long jumper
- Eriko Arakawa (荒川 恵理子; born 1979), Japanese women's footballer
- Hachiro Arakawa (荒川 八郎; born 1933), Japanese water polo player
- Hiromu Arakawa (荒川 弘; born 1973), Japanese manga artist
- Hiroshi Arakawa (荒川 博; 1930–2016), Japanese baseball player
- Miho Arakawa (荒川 美穂; born 1987), Japanese voice actress
- Minoru Arakawa (荒川 實; born 1946), Japanese businessman, former president of Nintendo of America
- Mitsu Arakawa (1927–1997), American professional wrestler
- Naoshi Arakawa (新川 直司), Japanese manga artist
- Naruhisa Arakawa (荒川 稔久; born 1964), Japanese screenwriter
- Nihito Arakawa (荒川 仁人; born 1981), Japanese boxer
- Shintarō Arakawa (荒川 慎太郎; born 1971), Japanese linguist
- Shizuka Arakawa (荒川 静香; born 1981), Japanese figure skater
- Shusaku Arakawa (荒川 修作; 1936–2010), Japanese artist and architect
- Tomoyuki Arakawa (荒川 知幸; born 1968), Japanese mathematician
- Toru Arakawa (荒川 通; 1932–2015), Japanese karateka
- Toshiyuki Arakawa (荒川 敏行; born 1953), Japanese composer
- Toyozō Arakawa (荒川 豊蔵; 1894–1985), Japanese potter
- Yasuhiko Arakawa (荒川 泰彦; born 1952), Japanese physicist
- Yoshiyoshi Arakawa (荒川 良々; born 1974), Japanese actor
- Yuta Arakawa (荒川 雄太; born 1987), Japanese baseball player
