= Arai =

Arai may refer to:

== Places ==
- Arain, Armenia
- Arai, Niigata, Japan
- Arai, Shizuoka, Japan

== People ==
- Arai (surname)

== Companies ==
- Arai Helmet (アライ), a Japanese motorcycle helmet manufacturer
- ARAI (Automotive Research Association of India), an R&D, Certification & Regulatory body in India

== Organisations ==
- Archives and Records Association, Ireland
