= Yoshiko Tōma =

Japanese politician (born 1949)

- 当摩 好子

Mayor of Tokorozawa
- In office 30 October 2007 – 29 October 2011
- Preceded by: Hiroshi Saitō
- Succeeded by: Masato Fujimoto

Member of the Saitama Prefectural Assembly
- In office April 1999 – September 2007

Member of the Tokorozawa City Council
- In office April 1979 – April 1991

Personal details
- Born: 26 April 1949 (age 77) Ōmuta, Fukuoka, Japan
- Party: Independent
- Other political affiliations: JSP (1979–1996); SDP (1996); DP (1996–1998); DPJ (1998–2007)
- Education: Keio University; Japan College of Social Work

Yoshiko Tōma (当摩 好子, Tōma Yoshiko; born 26 April 1949) is a Japanese politician from Ōmuta, Fukuoka.

Having graduated from Keio University, Tōma was elected to Tokorozawa City Council in 1979. She ran unsuccessfully for the Tokorozawa mayoral election in 1991 and for the national lower house election in 1996 before she was elected to the Saitama Prefectural Assembly in 1999. Elected as mayor of Tokorozawa in October 2007, Tōma became the first woman to hold that post.

Preceded by Hiroshi Saitō	Mayor of Tokorozawa, Saitama; 2007–2011	Succeeded by Masato Fujimoto
