= Toshinori =

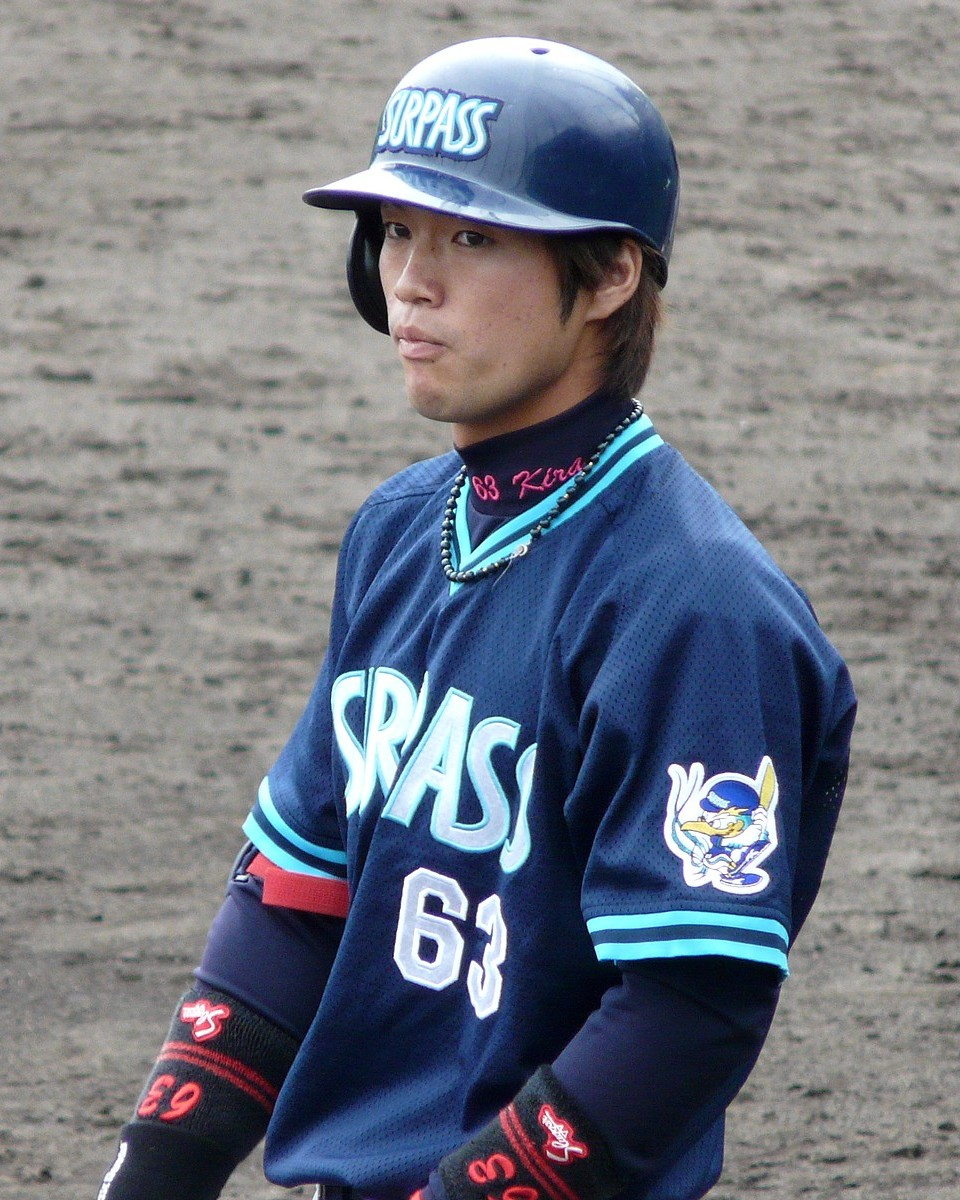
- Toshinori Kira. Japanese baseball player.
- Pronunciation: toɕinoɾi (IPA)
- Gender: Male

Origin
- Origin: Japanese
- Meaning: Different meanings depending on the kanji used

Other names
- Alternative spelling: Tosinori (Kunrei-shiki) Tosinori (Nihon-shiki) Toshinori (Hepburn)

Toshinori is a masculine Japanese given name.

== Written forms ==
Toshinori can be written using different combinations of kanji characters. Some examples:

- 敏徳, "agile, virtue"
- 敏憲, "agile, constitution"
- 敏典, "agile, law code"
- 敏紀, "agile, chronicle"
- 敏則, "agile, measure"
- 敏範, "agile, pattern"
- 俊徳, "talented, virtue"
- 俊紀, "talented, chronicle"
- 年紀, "year, chronicle"
- 年徳, "year, virtue"
- 利紀, "benefit, chronicle"
- 利徳, "benefit, virtue"
- 寿紀, "long life, chronicle"
- 寿徳, "long life, virtue"
- 等則, "grade, measure"

The name can also be written in hiragana としのり or katakana トシノリ.

== Notable people with the name ==
- Toshinori Asanuma (浅沼 寿紀; born 1989), Japanese baseball player
- Toshinori Koga (古賀 俊憲; born 1948), Japanese boxer
- Toshinori Muto (武藤 俊憲, born 1978), Japanese golfer
- Toshinori Sogabe (宗我部 としのり), Japanese manga artist
- Toshinori Wakanohō (若ノ鵬 寿則; born 1988), Russian sumo wrestler
- Toshinori Yonekura (米倉 利紀; born 1972), Japanese singer-songwriter

== Fictional characters ==
- Toshinori Honda (本田 敏則), from manga and anime Hikaru no Go
- Toshinori Yagi (八木 俊典), AKA: All Might, from the manga and anime My Hero Academia
