= Nobuaki =

- Gender: Male

Origin
- Origin: Japanese
- Meaning: Different meanings depending on the kanji used

Nobuaki (written: 信著, 信朗, 信明, 信昭, 信秋, 伸顕, 伸明, 伸彰, 修光 or 陳爾) is a masculine Japanese given name. Notable people with the name include:

- Nobuaki Anzai (安斎 伸彰; born 1985), Japanese Go player
- Nobuaki Arai (荒井 修光; born 1973), Japanese baseball player
- Nobuaki Iwatake (岩竹 信明; 1923–2012), American Imperial Japanese Army personnel
- Nobuaki Kakuda (角田 信朗; born 1961), Japanese karateka
- Nobuaki Kaneko (金子 信昭; born 1981), Japanese drummer and actor
- Nobuaki Katayama, Japanese automotive engineer
- Nobuaki Kobayashi (小林 伸明; 1942–2019), Japanese billiards player
- Nobuaki Koga (古贺 伸明; born 1952), Japanese trade unionist
- Nobuaki Maeda (前田 陳爾; 1907–1975), Japanese Go player
- Makino Nobuaki (牧野 伸顕; 1861–1949), Japanese diplomat
- Nobuaki Minegishi (嶺岸 信明; born 1959), Japanese manga artist
- Nobuaki Nakanishi (中西 伸彰), Japanese anime director
- Nobuaki Sato (佐藤 信秋; born 1947), Japanese politician
- Nobuaki Sekine (関根 信昭; born 1934), Japanese anime director
- Tsugaru Nobuaki (津軽 信著; 1719–1746), Japanese daimyō
- Yamadera Nobuaki, Japanese samurai
- Nobuaki Yanagida (柳田 伸明; born 1970), Japanese footballer and manager
