= Lolagi Visinia =

New Zealand rugby union player (born 1993)

- Born: 17 January 1993 (age 33) Auckland, New Zealand
- Height: 194 cm (6 ft 4 in)
- Weight: 99 kg (218 lb; 15 st 8 lb)
- School: Kelston Boys' High School

Rugby union career
- Position(s): Wing, fullback
- Current team: Auckland
Senior career
Years	Team	Apps	(Points)
2012–2016, 2024	Auckland	44	(83)
2013–2016	Blues	33	(42)
2017–2019	Grenoble	40	(85)
2019–2020	NEC Green Rockets	10	(15)
2020–2023	Hawke's Bay	37	(75)
2021	Hurricanes	1	(0)
2022–	Moana Pasifika	5	(0)
- Correct as of 6 November 2024
International career
Years	Team	Apps	(Points)
2013	New Zealand U20	4	(20)
2022	Samoa	3	(0)
- Correct as of 16 July 2022
National sevens team
Years	Team		Comps
2012	New Zealand		2
- Correct as of 20 June 2021

Lolagi Visinia (born 17 January 1993) is a rugby union player, who currently plays as a wing or fullback for Auckland in New Zealand's domestic National Provincial Championship competition. He was born and raised in New Zealand, but has represented both New Zealand (in sevens) and Manu Samoa internationally.

== Early career ==
Visinia attended Kelston Boys' High School, where he turned out for the school's first XV. Although Kelston Boys 1st XV didn't win the Auckland competition in 2011, Visinia helped his team win their first National Top 4 title in 12 years. He scored a try in the 24 – 14 win over Wesley College in the Final. Later that year, Visinia also played for the Kelston Boys' sevens team that won the Condor Sevens, an annual Secondary School Sevens tournament in New Zealand.

During his time at Kelston Boys', Visinia represented Auckland and the Blues at age grade level, both in the 15-a-side game and in sevens.

== Senior career ==
On 14 August 2012, at the age of 19, Visinia was named in the Auckland ITM Cup squad, for the first time. He made his provincial debut – off the bench – on 2 September 2012 against Manawatu and his starting debut on 7 October 2012 against North Harbour. He scored his first try for Auckland on 27 October 2012 against Canterbury in the 2011 ITM Cup Premiership Final that Auckland lost 18 – 31.

While not named in the Blues squad for the 2013 Super Rugby season, Visinia – as a member of the Blues wider training group – made his Super Rugby debut on 13 July 2013 against the Chiefs. It was his only Super Rugby game that season, but he was named in the Blues squad for 2014. He scored his first try for the Blues on 25 April 2014 against the Waratahs.

Visinia spent four seasons at the Blues, before signing with French club Grenoble in November 2016. At the end of the 2017–18 Rugby Pro D2 season, his first with the club, Grenoble secured promotion to the Top 14 after winning a promotion/relegation match 47–22 against Oyonnax. Visinia scored two tries in that game. However, after the 2018–19 Top 14 season, Grenoble was relegated back to the Pro D2 after losing a promotion/relegation match 22 -28 against Brive. It turned out to be Visinia's last season with the club.

On 3 June 2019, Japanese club NEC Green Rockets announced the signing of Visinia. He made his debut for the club on 22 June 2019 against Mazda Blue Zoomers, scoring 2 tries on debut. He played a total of 10 games (scoring 5 tries) for the Green Rockets; five games for the 2019 Top League Cup and five Top League games. The 2020 Top League season was cancelled after round 6 due to the COVID-19 pandemic and Visinia returned to New Zealand.

In July 2020, it was announced that Visinia would join Hawke's Bay for the Mitre 10 Cup. He made his debut for the Magpies – off the bench – against Southland on 13 September 2020. A week later he was named in the starting line-up against Counties Manukau and scored his first try for the Magpies in that game. He went on to play 11 games – in which he scored 5 tries – in his first season for Hawke's Bay, helping the Magpies win the 2020 Mitre 10 Cup Championship title and the Ranfurly Shield. At the end of the season, he was named the Magpies' Rookie of the Year.

On 2 December 2020, Visinia was named in the Hurricanes squad for the 2021 Super Rugby season. He made his debut for the franchise on 21 May 2021 against the Rebels, in what turned out to be the only game he played for the Hurricanes.

On 26 October 2021, Moana Pasifika announced that it had signed Visinia for the 2022 Super Rugby Pacific season. On 29 March 2022, he made his debut for the new franchise – via the bench – in their home game against the Blues. His first start for Moana Pasifika followed on 12 April 2022 against the Hurricanes.

In 2024, after four seasons playing for Hawke's Bay, Visinia returned to where it all began. On 29 July 2024, he was named in the Auckland squad for the 2024 NPC season.

== International career ==
After a successful 1st XV season with Kelston Boys' High School, Visinia was named in the 2011 New Zealand Secondary Schools team that played matches against Australian Schools and Australian Schools 'A'.

Fresh out of school, at the age of 19, he was part of the 2012 New Zealand Sevens squad. He played in the Hong Kong and Japan rounds of the 2011–12 IRB Sevens World Series.

A year later, Visinia was named in the New Zealand Under-20 squad for the 2013 IRB Junior World Championship. He played in 4 games and scored 4 tries during the tournament.

As a result of a change in international eligibility rules – adopted by World Rugby on 24 November 2021 – which allows captured players to change to a new country once, provided they or their (grand)parents were born in the new country, Visinia – who is of Samoan descent – was able to play for Manu Samoa despite having represented New Zealand in sevens. On 2 June 2022, he was named in the Manu Samoa squad for the first time. He made his international debut for Samoa on 2 July 2022 against Australia A in their first game of the 2022 Pacific Nations Cup, which they won 31–26.

== See also ==
- International rugby union eligibility rules
