= Norihiro =

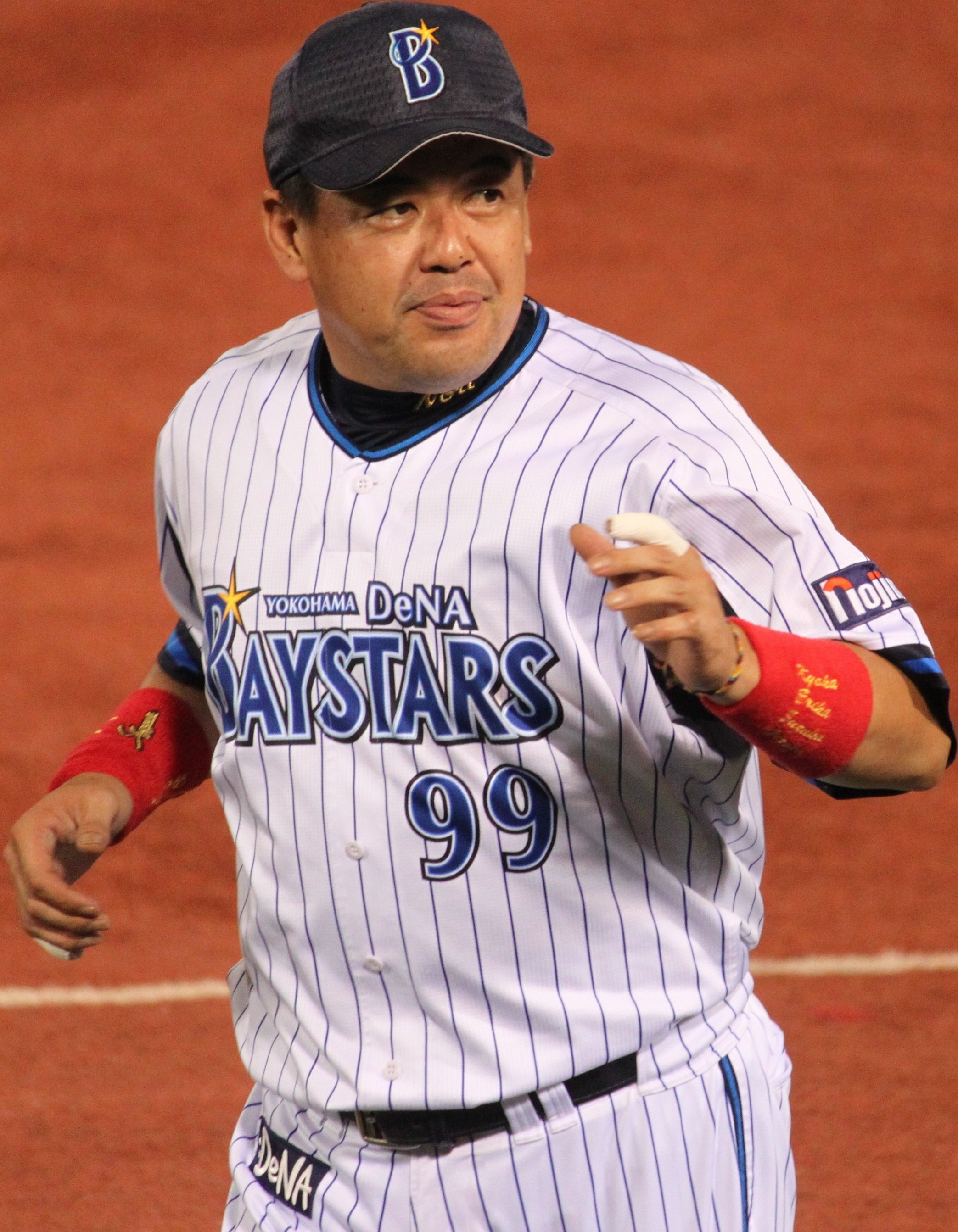
- Norihiro Nakamura, Japanese baseball player
- Gender: Male

Origin
- Origin: Japanese
- Meaning: Different meanings depending on the kanji used

Norihiro (written: 仙弘, 了洋, 紀寛, 紀洋, 乗寛, 範宏, 憲広, 教広, 教博, 典洋, 倫宏, 規広 or 謙宏) is a masculine Japanese given name. Notable people with the name include:

- Norihiro Akahoshi (赤星 憲広; born 1976), Japanese baseball player
- Norihiro Akimura (秋村 謙宏; born 1966), Japanese baseball player
- Norihiro Inoue (井上 倫宏; born 1958), Japanese actor and voice actor
- Norihiro Kawakami (川上 典洋; born 1987), Japanese footballer
- Matsudaira Norihiro (松平 乗寛; 1778–1839), Japanese daimyō
- Norihiro Nakamura (中村 紀洋; born 1973), Japanese baseball player
- Norihiro Nishi (西 紀寛; born 1980), Japanese footballer
- Norihiro Satsukawa (薩川 了洋; born 1972), Japanese footballer
- Norihiro Tsuru (都留 教博), Japanese violinist and composer
- Norihiro Yagi (八木 教広; born 1969), Japanese manga writer and artist
- Norihiro Yagura (矢倉 規広; born 1974), Japanese shogi player
- Norihiro Yamagishi (山岸 範宏; born 1978), Japanese footballer
- Norihiro Yasue (安江 仙弘; 1886–1950), Imperial Japanese Army officer
- Norihiro Yokoyama (横山 典弘; born 1968), Japanese jockey

== See also ==
- 29737 Norihiro, a main-belt asteroid
