= Yoshifumi =

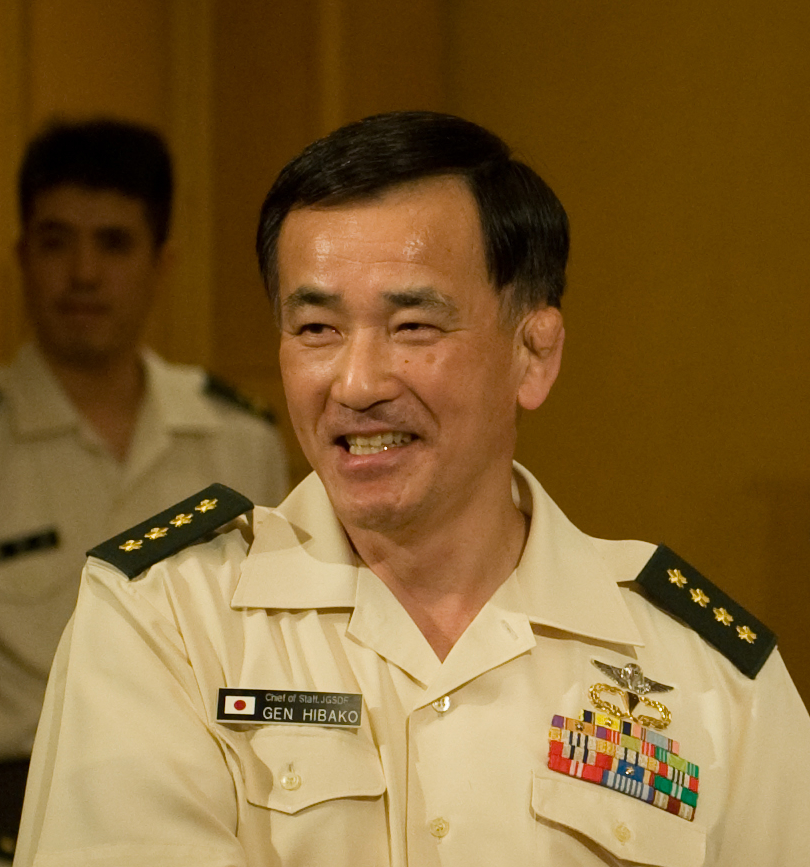
- Yoshifumi Hibako, Japanese general
- Pronunciation: joɕiɸɯmi (IPA)
- Gender: Male

Origin
- Origin: Japanese
- Meaning: Different meanings depending on the kanji used

Other names
- Alternative spelling: Yosihumi (Kunrei-shiki) Yosihumi (Nihon-shiki) Yoshifumi (Hepburn)

Yoshifumi is a masculine Japanese given name.

== Written forms ==
Yoshifumi can be written using many different combinations of kanji characters. Here are some examples:

- 義文, "justice, literature"
- 義郁, "justice, aroma/to move"
- 義史, "justice, history"
- 吉文, "good luck, literature"
- 吉郁, "good luck, aroma/to move"
- 吉史, "good luck, history"
- 善文, "virtuous, literature"
- 善史, "virtuous, history"
- 芳文, "virtuous/fragrant, literature"
- 芳史, "virtuous/fragrant, history"
- 良文, "good, literature"
- 良史, "good, history"
- 慶文, "congratulate, literature"
- 由文, "reason, literature"
- 与志文, "give, determination, literature"
- 嘉史, "excellent, history"
- 嘉文, "excellent, literature"
- 喜文, "rejoice, literature"

The name can also be written in hiragana よしふみ or katakana ヨシフミ.

== Notable people with the name ==
- Yoshifumi Ayukawa (鮎川 義文, born 1970), Japanese baseball player
- Yoshifumi Fujimori (藤森 喜文; born 1958), Japanese hurdler
- Yoshifumi Hattori (服部 義文), Japanese photographer
- Yoshifumi Hibako (火箱 芳文, born 1951), Japanese General
- Yoshifumi Kondo (近藤 喜文, 1950–1998), Japanese animator and director
- Yoshifumi Matsumura (松村 祥史, born 1964), Japanese legislator
- Yoshifumi Naoi (直井 由文, born 1979), bassist of the band Bump of Chicken
- Yoshifumi Ōta (太田 慶文, born 1951), Japanese painter
- Yoshifumi Saito (斉藤 好史; born 1958), Japanese water polo player
- Yoshifumi Seki (関 義文; born 1953), Japanese boxer
- Yoshifumi Tajima (田島 義文, 1918–2009), Japanese actor
