= Hiroshi Saitō (mayor) =

Japanese politician (born 1939)

- 齋藤 博

Mayor of Tokorozawa
- In office 30 October 1991 – 29 October 2007
- Preceded by: Shin'ichirō Nakai
- Succeeded by: Yoshiko Tōma

Member of the Saitama Prefectural Assembly
- In office 1979–1991

Member of the Tokorozawa City Council
- In office 1971–1979

Personal details
- Born: 27 March 1939 (age 87) Tokorozawa, Saitama, Japan
- Party: Liberal Democratic

Hiroshi Saitō (斉藤博, Saitō Hiroshi; born 27 March 1939) is a Japanese politician from Tokorozawa, Saitama.

== Career ==
Having graduated from Chuo University, Saitō was elected to Tokorozawa City Council in 1971. In 1979, he was elected to Saitama Prefectural Assembly and served for 12 years.

In October 1991, Saitō was elected mayor of Tokorozawa.

He announced in August 2007 that he would not run for a fifth term and was succeeded by Yoshiko Tōma in October 2007.

== Controversies ==
While he was mayor of Tokorozawa, in 1997, TV Asahi aired a news report alleging that the vegetables grown in Tokorozawa were polluted with dioxin. Saitō had his salary docked for covering up information about the pollution.

Preceded by Shin'ichirō Nakai	Mayor of Tokorozawa, Saitama; 1991–2007	Succeeded by Yoshiko Tōma
