= Shinkawa =

Shinkawa may refer to:

- Shinkawa, Aichi, a former town in Nishikasugai District, Aichi Prefecture, Japan
- Shinkawa Station (Hokkaido), a railway station in Kita-ku, Sapporo, Hokkaido, Japan
- Shinkawa, Chūō, Tokyo, an area and artificial island in the ward of Chūō, Tokyo
- Shinkawa, Mitaka, Tokyo, an area in Mitaka city, Tokyo, location of Kyorin University

== People with the surname ==
- Hotate Shinkawa (新川 帆立, born 1991/1992), Japanese writer and lawyer
- Yoji Shinkawa (新川 洋司, born 1971), Japanese illustrator
- Yua Shinkawa (新川 優愛, born 1993), Japanese actress and model

== See also ==
- Arakawa (disambiguation)
