= Akimoto =

Akimoto (written: 秋元 or 秋本) is a Japanese surname. Notable people with the surname include:

- Emi Akimoto (秋元 恵美; born 1956), Japanese hurdler
- Hiroyuki Akimoto (秋本 啓之; born 1986), Japanese judoka
- Jin Akimoto (秋本 じん; born 1971), Japanese mixed martial artist
- Junko Akimoto (秋元 順子; born 1947), Japanese singer
- Katsuhiro Akimoto (秋元 克広; born 1956), Japanese politician
- Akimoto Kojima, birth name of Gojōrō Katsuhiro (born 1973)
- Kosaku Akimoto (秋元 宏作; born 1968), Japanese baseball player
- Kozue Akimoto (秋元 梢; born 1987), Japanese fashion model
- Manatsu Akimoto (秋元 真夏; born 1993), Japanese idol, singer, actress and television personality
- Masahiro Akimoto (秋元 正博; born 1956), Japanese former ski jumper
- Matsuyo Akimoto (秋元 松代; 1911–2001), Japanese playwright
- Masatoshi Akimoto (秋本 真利; born 1975), Japanese politician
- Michitaka Akimoto (秋本 倫孝; born 1982), Japanese footballer
- Nami Akimoto (秋元 奈美; born 1968), Japanese manga artist
- Naomi Akimoto (秋本 奈緒美; born 1963), Japanese actress and singer
- Osamu Akimoto (秋本 治; born 1952), Japanese manga artist
- Ryutarou Akimoto (秋元 龍太朗; born 1995), Japanese actor and model
- Sayaka Akimoto (秋元 才加; born 1988), Japanese actress, singer, and idol
- Takahiro Akimoto (明本 考浩; born 1998), Japanese footballer
- Tsubasa Akimoto (秋本 つばさ; born 1974), Japanese actress
- Tsukasa Akimoto (秋元 司; born 1971), Japanese politician
- Yasushi Akimoto (秋元 康; born 1956), Japanese television writer, lyricist and academic
- Yōsuke Akimoto (秋元 羊介; born 1944), Japanese actor and voice actor
- Yota Akimoto (秋元 陽太; born 1987), Japanese footballer

== Fictional characters ==
- Akimoto, minor character in the manga/anime series Hell Girl
- Komachi Akimoto (秋元こまち; a.k.a Cure Mint ("Kyua Minto")), major character in the 2007 anime series Yes! PreCure 5
- Madoka Akimoto (秋元 まどか), Komachi's older sister and a recurring character in the 2007 anime series Yes! PreCure 5
- Reiko Akimoto, a character in the manga series KochiKame: Tokyo Beat Cops

== Other uses ==
- Akimotoite, mineral
- Akimoto Lake, a lake located in Fukushima Prefecture
