= Kōsaku =

- Gender: Male

Origin
- Origin: Japanese
- Meaning: Different meanings depending on the kanji used

Kōsaku, Kosaku or Kousaku (written: 功作, 宏作, 幸作, 耕作, 耕筰, 興作, 孝作 or 浩作) is a masculine Japanese given name. Notable people with the name include:

- Kosaku Akimoto (秋元 宏作; born 1968), Japanese baseball player
- Aruga Kōsaku (有賀 幸作; 1897–1945), Imperial Japanese Navy admiral
- Kōsaku Hamada (濱田 耕作; 1881–1938), Japanese archaeologist and academic
- Kosaku Inaba (稲葉 興作; 1924–2006), Singapore-born Japanese businessman
- Kosaku Masuda (増田 功作; born 1976), Japanese footballer
- Kōsaku Matsumora (松茂良 興作; 1829–1898), Japanese karateka
- Satoyama Kōsaku (里山 浩作; born 1981), Japanese sumo wrestler
- Kosaku Shimada (島田 幸作; 1944–2008), Japanese golfer
- Kōsaku Takii (滝井 孝作; 1894–1984), Japanese poet and writer
- Kōsaku Yamada (山田 耕筰; 1886–1965), Japanese composer and conductor
- Kōsaku Yamashita (山下 耕作; 1930–1998), Japanese film director
- Yoshio Kōsaku (吉雄 幸作; 1724–1800), Japanese physician and translator
- Kōsaku Yosida (吉田 耕作; 1909–1990), Japanese mathematician
