= 2019 Top League Cup =

- Countries: Japan
- Date: 22 June – 10 August 2019
- Champions: Kobelco Steelers
- Runners-up: Kubota Spears

The 2019 Top League Cup was the second edition of the Top League Cup, a rugby union cup competition for Japan's Top League and Top Challenge League teams. This was the first time Top Challenge League teams played in the competition, after the 2018–19 featured Top League teams only.

== Competition rules ==
The 24 Top League and Top Challenge League teams were divided into four pools for the first stage of the competition, seeded as per their final positions in the 2018–19 season. Each pool consisted of a top seed that finished in the top four of the 2018–19 Top League, a second seed that finished between 5th and 8th, a third seed that finished between 9th and 12th, a fourth seed that finished between 13th and 16th, a fifth seed that finished in the top four of the 2018 Top Challenge League and a sixth seed that either finished between 5th and 8th, or was newly-promoted to the Top Challenge League. Each team played the five other teams in their pool once.

The four group winners qualified to the finals tournament semifinals, with the two semifinal winners progressing to the final.

== Teams ==
The following teams took part in the 2019 Top League Cup competition:

Team Name	Pool	2018–19 placing	Region
Canon Eagles	C	12th (Top League)	Machida, Tokyo, Kanto
Coca-Cola Red Sparks	C	16th (Top League)	Fukuoka, Kyushu
Hino Red Dolphins	A	14th (Top League)	Hino, Tokyo Metropolis
Honda Heat	A	9th (Top League)	Suzuka, Mie Prefecture
Kamaishi Seawaves	C	7th (Top Challenge League)	Kamaishi, Iwate Prefecture
Kintetsu Liners	D	3rd (Top Challenge League)	Higashiosaka, Osaka, Kansai
Kobelco Steelers	D	1st (Top League)	Kobe, Kansai
Kubota Spears	C	7th (Top League)	Abiko, Chiba, Kanto
Kurita Water Gush	A	4th (Top Challenge League)	Atsugi, Kanagawa Prefecture
Kyuden Voltex	B	5th (Top Challenge League)	Fukuoka, Kyushu
Mazda Blue Zoomers	D	6th (Top Challenge League)	Fuchu, Hiroshima Prefecture
Mitsubishi DynaBoars	C	2nd (Top Challenge League)	Sagamihara, Kanagawa Prefecture
Munakata Sanix Blues	B	14th (Top League)	Munakata, Fukuoka, Kyushu
NEC Green Rockets	D	10th (Top League)	Abiko, Chiba, Kanto
NTT Red Hurricanes	B	1st (Top Challenge League)	Osaka, Kansai
NTT Shining Arcs	B	5th (Top League)	Chiba, Chiba, Kanto
Panasonic Wild Knights	A	6th (Top League)	Ota, Gunma, Kanto
Ricoh Black Rams	D	8th (Top League)	Tokyo, Kanto
Shimizu Blue Sharks	A	Promoted to Top Challenge League	Chūō, Tokyo Metropolis
Suntory Sungoliath	A	2nd (Top League)	Fuchu, Tokyo, Kanto
Toshiba Brave Lupus	B	11th (Top League)	Fuchu, Tokyo, Kanto
Toyota Industries Shuttles	D	15th (Top League)	Aichi, Mizuho
Toyota Verblitz	C	4th (Top League)	Toyota, Aichi, Tokai
Yamaha Júbilo	B	3rd (Top League)	Iwata, Shizuoka, Tokai

== Pool phase ==
=== Pool A ===
2019–20 Top League Cup Pool A
#	Team	P	W	D	L	PF	PA	PD	TB	LB	Pts	Notes
1	Suntory Sungoliath	5	5	0	0	245	37	208			24	Advance to final tournament
2	Panasonic Wild Knights	5	4	0	1	184	83	101			20	
3	Honda Heat	5	3	0	2	109	116	−7			14	
4	Hino Red Dolphins	5	2	0	3	167	118	49			12	
5	Kurita Water Gush	5	1	0	4	53	177	−124			4	
6	Shimizu Blue Sharks	5	0	0	5	55	282	−227			0	

22 June 2019	Kurita Water Gush	3–33	Honda Heat	Kumagaya Rugby Stadium
11:45		Report

22 June 2019	Suntory Sungoliath	88–5	Shimizu Blue Sharks	Prince Chichibu Memorial Rugby Ground (Tokyo)
14:00		Report

22 June 2019	Panasonic Wild Knights	31–29	Hino Red Dolphins	Kumagaya Rugby Stadium
14:00		Report

29 June 2019	Panasonic Wild Knights	55–14	Shimizu Blue Sharks	Ashikaga Athletic stadium
13:00		Report

29 June 2019	Hino Red Dolphins	40–12	Kurita Water Gush	Prince Chichibu Memorial Rugby Ground (Tokyo)
14:00		Report

30 June 2019	Honda Heat	3–40	Suntory Sungoliath	Suzuka Sports Garden Rugby Ground (Mie)
14:00		Report

6 July 2019	Shimizu Blue Sharks	12–76	Hino Red Dolphins	Komazawa Olympic Park General Sports Ground
14:00		Report

6 July 2019	Suntory Sungoliath	55–7	Kurita Water Gush	Komazawa Olympic Park General Sports Ground
16:30		Report

6 July 2019	Panasonic Wild Knights	40–7	Honda Heat	Kumagaya Rugby Stadium
19:00		Report

12 July 2019	Hino Red Dolphins	3–39	Suntory Sungoliath	Prince Chichibu Memorial Rugby Ground (Tokyo)
19:30		Report

13 July 2019	Honda Heat	42–14	Shimizu Blue Sharks	Suzuka Sports Garden Rugby Ground (Mie)
19:00		Report

13 July 2019	Kurita Water Gush	10–39	Panasonic Wild Knights	Expo '70 Commemorative Stadium
19:00		Report

19 July 2019	Suntory Sungoliath	23–19	Panasonic Wild Knights	Prince Chichibu Memorial Rugby Ground (Tokyo)
19:30		Report

20 July 2019	Shimizu Blue Sharks	10–21	Kurita Water Gush	Sagamihara Gion Stadium
16:30		Report

20 July 2019	Honda Heat	24–19	Hino Red Dolphins	Suzuka Sports Garden Rugby Ground (Mie)
19:00		Report

=== Pool B ===
2019–20 Top League Cup Pool B
#	Team	P	W	D	L	PF	PA	PD	TB	LB	Pts	Notes
1	Toshiba Brave Lupus	5	5	0	0	194	82	112			23	Advance to final tournament
2	NTT Com Shining Arcs	5	4	0	1	215	76	139			20	
3	Yamaha Jubilo	5	3	0	2	190	86	104			16	
4	NTT Red Hurricanes	5	2	0	3	111	117	−6			10	
5	Munakata Sanix Blues	5	1	0	4	50	206	−156			4	
6	Kyuden Voltex	5	0	0	5	70	263	−193			1	

22 June 2019	NTT Red Hurricanes	33–5	Munakata Sanix Blues	Higashiomi Nobiki Sports Park Stadium
12:00		Report

22 June 2019	Yamaha Jubilo	62–12	Kyuden Voltex	Tsukisamu (Hokkaido)
13:00		Report

23 June 2019	NTT Com Shining Arcs	24–31	Toshiba Brave Lupus	Prince Chichibu Memorial Rugby Ground (Tokyo)
13:00		Report

29 June 2019	Kyuden Voltex	5–45	NTT Red Hurricanes	Mikuni World Stadium, Kitakyushu
11:30		Report

29 June 2019	Munakata Sanix Blues	6–57	NTT Com Shining Arcs	Mikuni World Stadium, Kitakyushu
14:00		Report

29 June 2019	Yamaha Jubilo	21–24	Toshiba Brave Lupus	Shizuoka Stadium ECOPA
14:30		Report

5 July 2019	NTT Red Hurricanes	12–36	Yamaha Jubilo	Expo '70 Commemorative Stadium
19:30		Report

6 July 2019	NTT Com Shining Arcs	67–14	Kyuden Voltex	Kamaishi Recovery Memorial Stadium
11:30		Report

6 July 2019	Toshiba Brave Lupus	42–5	Munakata Sanix Blues	National Training Center J-Village
16:00		Report

13 July 2019	Munakata Sanix Blues	27–22	Kyuden Voltex	Global Arena
17:00		Report

13 July 2019	Yamaha Jubilo	19–31	NTT Com Shining Arcs	Yamaha Stadium
17:00		Report

13 July 2019	Toshiba Brave Lupus	35–15	NTT Red Hurricanes	Prince Chichibu Memorial Rugby Ground (Tokyo)
19:00		Report

19 July 2019	NTT Red Hurricanes	6–36	NTT Com Shining Arcs	Expo '70 Commemorative Stadium
19:30		Report

20 July 2019	Kyuden Voltex	17–62	Toshiba Brave Lupus	Level 5 Stadium
16:30		Report

20 July 2019	Munakata Sanix Blues	7–52	Yamaha Jubilo	Level 5 Stadium
19:00		Report

=== Pool C ===
2019–20 Top League Cup Pool C
#	Team	P	W	D	L	PF	PA	PD	TB	LB	Pts	Notes
1	Kubota Spears	5	5	0	0	121	42	79			23	Advance to final tournament
2	Canon Eagles	5	4	0	1	131	59	72			20	
3	Coca-Cola Red Sparks	5	3	0	2	101	112	−11			14	
4	Kamaishi Seawaves	5	2	0	3	54	160	−106			9	
5	Mitsubishi DynaBoars	5	1	0	4	53	87	−34			7	
6	Toyota Verblitz	5	0	0	5	0	0	0			0	Withdrew from competition

22 June 2019	Kubota Spears	43–7	Coca-Cola Red Sparks	Edogawa Stadium
13:00		Report

23 June 2019	Kamaishi Seawaves	7–55	Canon Eagles	Morioka Minami
14:00		Report

29 June 2019	Kamaishi Seawaves	7–39	Kubota Spears	Prince Chichibu Memorial Rugby Ground (Tokyo)
11:30		Report

30 June 2019	Coca-Cola Red Sparks	25–24	Mitsubishi DynaBoars	Honjo Athletic Stadium
13:00		Report

6 July 2019	Canon Eagles	33–17	Coca-Cola Red Sparks	Prince Chichibu Memorial Rugby Ground (Tokyo)
16:30		Report

6 July 2019	Mitsubishi DynaBoars	7–12	Kubota Spears	Prince Chichibu Memorial Rugby Ground (Tokyo)
19:00		Report

13 July 2019	Canon Eagles	21–27	Kubota Spears	Expo '70 Commemorative Stadium
16:30		Report

13 July 2019	Mitsubishi DynaBoars	14–28	Kamaishi Seawaves	Prince Chichibu Memorial Rugby Ground (Tokyo)
16:30		Report

20 July 2019	Coca-Cola Red Sparks	52–12	Kamaishi Seawaves	EGAO Kenko Stadium
18:30		Report

20 July 2019	Mitsubishi DynaBoars	8–22	Canon Eagles	Sagamihara Gion Stadium
19:00		Report

=== Pool D ===
2019–20 Top League Cup Pool D
#	Team	P	W	D	L	PF	PA	PD	TB	LB	Pts	Notes
1	Kobelco Steelers	5	5	0	0	211	77	134			23	Advance to final tournament
2	Kintetsu Liners	5	4	0	1	210	89	121			19	
3	NEC Green Rockets	5	3	0	2	119	125	−6			14	
4	Ricoh Black Rams	5	2	0	3	162	78	84			12	
5	Toyota Industries Shuttles	5	1	0	4	69	174	−105			4	
6	Mazda Blue Zoomers	5	0	0	5	58	286	−228			1	

22 June 2019	NEC Green Rockets	43–12	Mazda Blue Zoomers	Prince Chichibu Memorial Rugby Ground (Tokyo)
11:30		Report

22 June 2019	Toyota Industries Shuttles	14–36	Ricoh Black Rams	Paloma Mizuho Rugby Stadium
13:00		Report

22 June 2019	Kobelco Steelers	22–14	Kintetsu Liners	Kimiidera Athletic Stadium
17:00		Report

28 June 2019	NEC Green Rockets	7–5	Ricoh Black Rams	Prince Chichibu Memorial Rugby Ground (Tokyo)
19:30		Report

29 June 2019	Kobelco Steelers	38–12	Toyota Industries Shuttles	Naruto Otsuka Sports Park Pocarisweat Stadium
13:00		Report

30 June 2019	Kintetsu Liners	50–10	Mazda Blue Zoomers	Suzuka Sports Garden Rugby Ground (Mie)
11:30		Report

5 July 2019	Ricoh Black Rams	13–19	Kobelco Steelers	Prince Chichibu Memorial Rugby Ground (Tokyo)
19:30		Report

6 July 2019	Mazda Blue Zoomers	24–26	Toyota Industries Shuttles	Tawarayama Spa Stadium, Yamaguchi
15:00		Report

6 July 2019	NEC Green Rockets	19–56	Kintetsu Liners	Kumagaya Rugby Stadium
16:45		Report

13 July 2019	Kintetsu Liners	38–26	Ricoh Black Rams	Coca Cola Bottlers Japan Inc Hiroshima Stadium
15:00		Report

13 July 2019	Toyota Industries Shuttles	5–24	NEC Green Rockets	Suzuka Sports Garden Rugby Ground (Mie)
16:30		Report

13 July 2019	Mazda Blue Zoomers	12–85	Kobelco Steelers	Coca-Cola Stadium, Hiroshima
17:30		Report

19 July 2019	Kobelco Steelers	47–26	NEC Green Rockets	Universiade Memorial Stadium (Kobe Sports Park)
19:30		Report

20 July 2019	Toyota Industries Shuttles	12–52	Kintetsu Liners	Suzuka Sports Garden Rugby Ground (Mie)
16:30		Report

20 July 2019	Ricoh Black Rams	82–0	Mazda Blue Zoomers	Prince Chichibu Memorial Rugby Ground (Tokyo)
16:30		Report

== Cup playoffs ==
=== Semifinals ===
4 August 2019	Suntory Sungoliath	26–32	Kobelco Steelers	Yanmar Field Nagai
17:00		Report

4 August 2019	Kubota Spears	31–24	Toshiba Brave Lupus	NHK Spring Mitsuzawa Football Stadium
17:00		Report

=== Final ===
10 August 2019	Kobelco Steelers	43–7	Kubota Spears	Hanazono Rugby Stadium
18:00		Report
