= Etsuji Arai =

Japanese politician

- 新井 悦二

Member of the House of Representatives
- In office 11 September 2005 – 21 July 2009
- Preceded by: Ryuji Koizumi
- Succeeded by: Ryuji Koizumi
- Constituency: Saitama 11th

Member of the Saitama Prefectural Assembly
- In office 2003–2005

Personal details
- Born: 4 September 1957 (age 69) Fukaya, Saitama, Japan
- Party: Liberal Democratic
- Relatives: Iemitsu Arai (brother)
- Education: Kanagawa Dental College

Etsuji Arai (新井 悦二, Arai Etsuji; born 4 September 1957) is a former Japanese politician of the Liberal Democratic Party, who served as a member of the House of Representatives in the Diet (national legislature). A native of Fukaya, Saitama and graduate of Kanagawa Dental College, he obtained his medical license in 1984 and became the assistant director at a hospital in Fukaya in 1986. He was elected to the Saitama Prefectural Assembly in 2003 (serving for one term) and then to the House of Representatives for the first time in 2005.

== See also ==
- Koizumi Children
