= Hakata no Rokku =

Collection of Japanese artists

Mentai Rock (Japanese: めんたいロック) is the name given to the collection of Japanese artists who gained national popularity during the late 1970s. Continuing through the early 1980s, the collective had little in common other than their origin - the Hakata ward of Fukuoka City. The phrase, Mentai Rock, was derived from the name of a local delicacy, mentaiko, made from roe. Many believed that their origin also had a common influence on the overall sound, despite the wide variety of genres represented.

== List of Mentai Rockers ==
- SONHOUSE
- Sheena & the Rokkets
- The Roosters
- The Rockers
- A.R.B.
- THE MODS
- 山部善次郎(YAMAZEN)
- Accidents
- Modern Dollz
- HEATWAVE
- Zi:LiE-YA
- Rock'n'Roll Gypsies
