= Iemitsu Arai =

Japanese politician

- 新井 家光

Mayor of Fukaya
- In office 1999 – 11 February 2010
- Preceded by: Kensuke Fukushima
- Succeeded by: Susumu Kojima

Member of the Saitama Prefectural Assembly
- In office 1995–1999

Personal details
- Born: 5 May 1955 (age 71) Fukaya, Saitama, Japan
- Party: Liberal Democratic
- Relatives: Etsuji Arai (brother)
- Education: Teikyo University

Iemitsu Arai (新井 家光, Arai Iemitsu; born 5 May 1955) is a Japanese politician from Fukaya, Saitama.

After graduating from Teikyo University, Arai became an orthopedic surgeon. He was elected mayor of Fukaya with the backing of Liberal Democratic Party (LDP) and New Komeito Party (NKP) in 1999.

His younger brother Etsuji served as a LDP member of the Diet of Japan.

Preceded by Kensuke Fukushima	Mayor of Fukaya, Saitama; 1999–2010	Succeeded by Susumu Kojima
