= Kanagawa Dental University =

Dental school in Yokosuka, Japan

Coordinates: 35°17′06″N 139°40′08″E

- 神奈川歯科大学
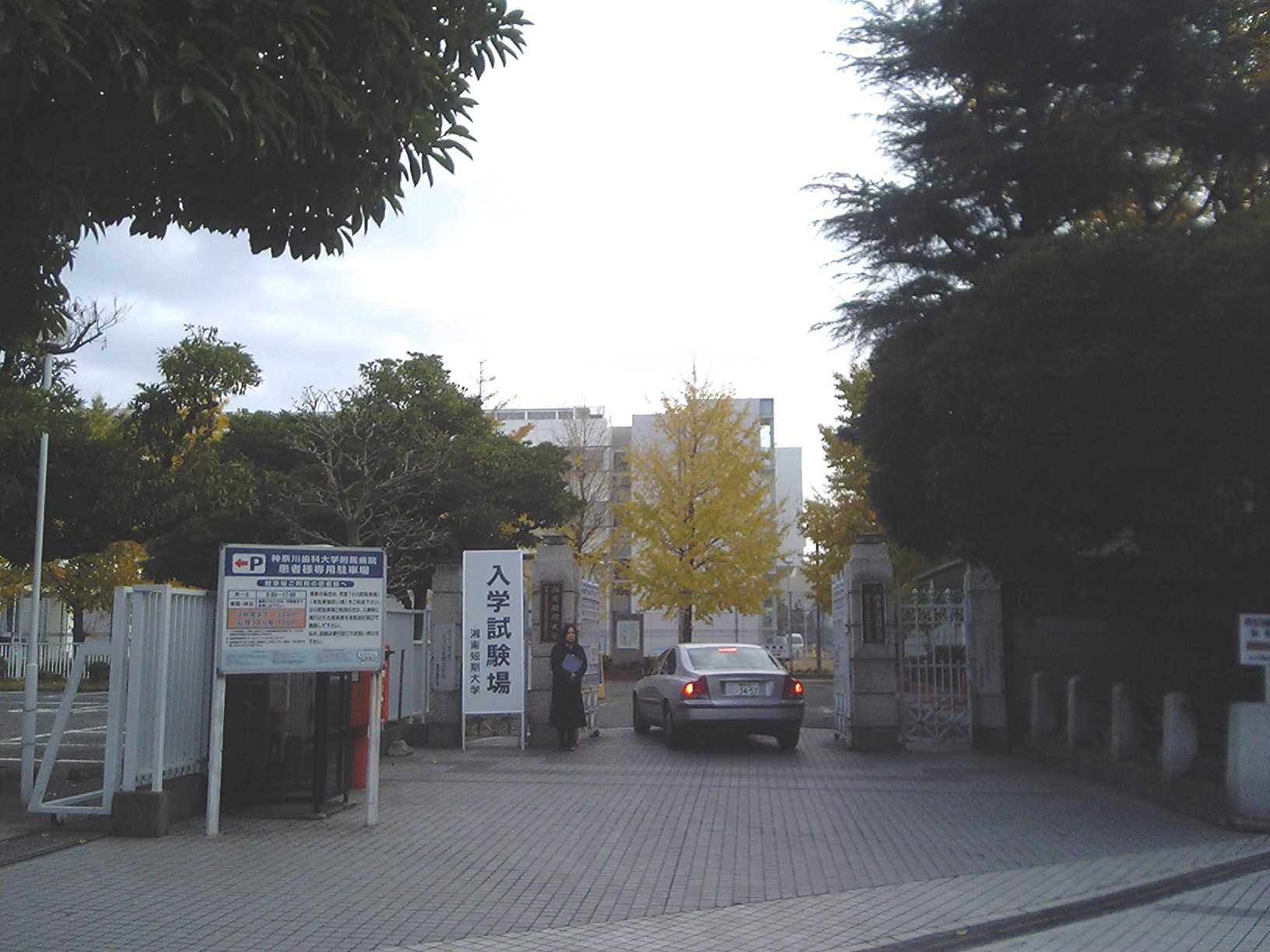
- Type: Private
- Established: 1964
- Location: Yokosuka, Kanagawa, Japan
- Website: www.kdu.ac.jp/english_hp/

Kanagawa Dental University (神奈川歯科大学, Kanagawa Shika Daigaku) is a private university in Yokosuka, Kanagawa, Japan.

The predecessor of the school was founded in 1910 in Kanda, Tokyo as the Tokyo Joshi Shika Gakiun Gakkō (東京女子歯科医学校). After the 1923 Great Kantō earthquake, it relocated to Shinagawa. It relocated again to Ota-ku, Tokyo in 1933, and to its present location in Yokosuka in 1964. It was chartered as a coeducational university in 1964.

Kanagawa Dental University Junior College is a subsidiary of the Kanagawa Dental College, and shares the same campus.

== Alumni ==
- Etsuji Arai (born 1957), politician
