= Kanagawa Dental University Junior College =

Junior college in Kanagawa Prefecture, Japan

Coordinates: 35°17′06″N 139°40′08″E

- 神奈川歯科大学短期大学部; Kanagawa shika daigaku tankidaigaku bu
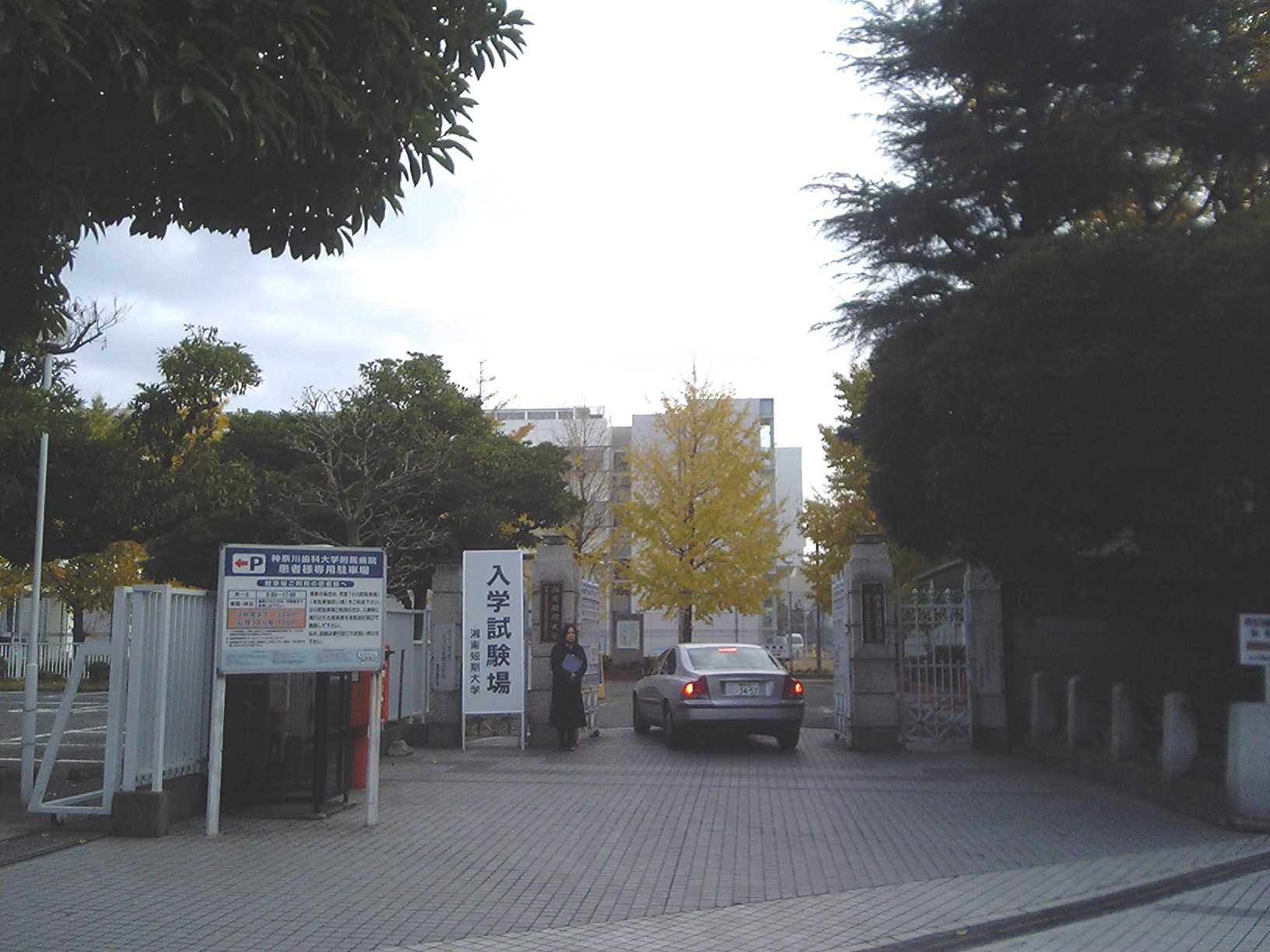
- Type: Private
- Established: 1910
- Location: Yokosuka, Kanagawa, Kanagawa, Japan
- Website: www.kdu.ac.jp/college/

SKanagawa Dental University Junior College (神奈川歯科大学短期大学部, Kanagawa shika daigaku tankidaigaku bu) is a private junior college in Yokosuka, Kanagawa Prefecture, Japan, established in 1952.

The predecessor of the school was founded in 1910 in Kanda, Tokyo as the Tokyo Joshi Shika Gakiun Gakkō (東京女子歯科医学校), the first women's dental school in Japan. After the 1923 Great Kantō earthquake, it relocated to Shinagawa. It relocated again to Ota-ku, Tokyo in 1933, and to its present location in Yokosuka in 1964 as the Kanagawa Dental College. The junior college was established in 1952, and shares the same campus. The primary aspect of its curriculum is to provide the commercial, legal and communications skills for a successful dental practice.

== Faculties ==
- Faculty of Dental Hygiene
- Faculty of Nursing

== See also ==
- Kanagawa Dental University
