= Arakawa =

Arakawa (荒川) may refer to:

== People ==
- Arakawa (surname)

== Places in Japan ==
=== Populated places ===
- Arakawa, Tokyo, a special ward
  - Tokyo Sakura Tram (Arakawa Line), a streetcar system
- Arakawa, Niigata, a former municipality
- Arakawa, Saitama, a former municipality

=== Rivers ===
- Arakawa River (Kanto), which flows from Saitama Prefecture and through Tokyo
- Arakawa River (Fukushima), which starts and ends in Fukushima City, Fukushima
- Arakawa River (Uetsu), which flows from Yamagata Prefecture to Niigata Prefecture in northern Japan

== See also ==
- Arakawa's syndrome I
- Arakawa's syndrome II
- Arakawa Under the Bridge
