= Miya Ando =

Contemporary American artist

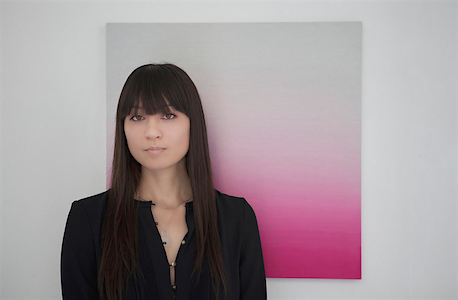
- Born: 1973 (age 52–53)
- Education: University of California, Berkeley, Yale University
- Awards: Venice Biennale
- Website: www.miyaando.com

Miya Ando (born 1973) is an American visual artist recognized for her paintings, sculptures, and installation artworks that address concepts of temporality, interdependence, and impermanence. Her artworks have been exhibited in museums, galleries, and public spaces worldwide. She is the author of Water of the Sky, a Dictionary of 2000 Japanese Rain Words published by The MIT Press

== Central themes and career ==
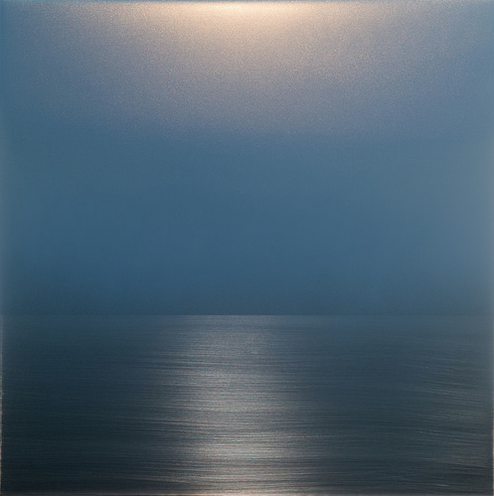
Yūgen blue gold view 2 22 × 22 inches pigment urethane resin aluminum, 2016, by Ando

=== 森羅万象 (Shinrabanshō) ===
A forest of countless forms; all things under heaven, understood as one continuous field.

Miya Ando’s work is rooted in the intersection of nature and impermanence. Her practice engages philosophical inquiry into time and natural cycles. She constructs visual systems that give form to vanishing conditions such as seasonal transitions, atmospheric change, and the fading of cultural memory.

Central to her work is the Japanese aphorism mono no aware, an attunement to transience and the quiet poignancy of things as they pass. This sensibility informs her understanding of time as something registered rather than depicted, emerging through gradual change and accumulation. Within this framework, disappearance functions as a structural condition.

Her practice is structured around observation over time. Fog, moon phases, and rainfall are approached as durational conditions rather than fixed images. Materials and form are guided by this logic. Working across painting, sculpture, and installation, her multi-medium practice follows from the belief that each concept is best conveyed through the material that most viscerally reiterates its idea.

In an era when ecological systems are unstable and digital technologies compress our experience of time, her work proposes a different way of perceiving its passage. Language functions structurally within her practice; titles are drawn from untranslatable Japanese idioms and naming traditions that encode seasonal change, weather, and time. Raised between Northern California and a Buddhist temple in Japan, Ando works from a hybrid perspective, merging Eastern and Western epistemologies.

Ando's work has been featured in solo exhibitions at institutions including the Asia Society Texas, Noguchi Museum, SCAD Museum of Art, Lowe Art Museum, the Bolinas Museum, Katzen Arts Center at the American University Museum, the Cornell Museum, and Hammond Museum and Japanese Garden. Artworks by Ando have also been featured in group exhibitions of institutions including the Los Angeles County Museum of Art, Detroit Institute of Arts, Santa Barbara Museum of Art, Crystal Bridges Museum of American Art, Toyama Glass Art Museum; Haus Der Kunst, Bronx Museum of Arts, Queens Museum, Smithsonian American Art Museum, Scottsdale Museum of Contemporary Art, Katonah Museum of Art, Spartanburg Art Museum, the Museum of Art and History, Nassau County Museum of Art, the de Saisset Museum, Frederick R. Weisman Museum of Art, Toyama Glass Art Museum, Worcester Art Museum, Newhouse Center for Contemporary Art Museum, Museum of Byzantine Culture, Museum of Contemporary Art Santa Barbara, Queens Museum of Art, Detroit Institute of Arts Museum, and Jean Paul Najar Foundation Museum. In 2014, Ando was invited to lecture at New York's Metropolitan Museum of Art.

== Collections ==
Ando's work is held in the following permanent collections:

- LACMA (Los Angeles County Museum of Art)
- Detroit Institute of Arts, MI
- SMoCa (The Scottsdale Museum of Contemporary Art)
- The Corning Museum of Glass
- The Santa Barbara Museum of Art
- Ueshima Museum Collection
- MOAH (The Museum of Art and History)
- Bang Olufsen collaboration
- The Monterey Museum of Art
- The Bolinas Museum
- The SCAD (Savannah College of Art and Design) Museum of Art
- Haus Der Kunst - Munich, Germany
- Nassau County Museum of Art
- Luft Museum, Germany
- Socrates Sculpture Park
- The Ruth Chandler Williamson Gallery, Scripps College
- Santa Barbara Museum of Art
- Jean Paul Najar Foundation Museum
- The Fine Art Program and Collection at Montefiore Einstein
- The Lowe Art Museum
- Faena Art Collection
- Daitoku-ji Temple, Kyoto Japan
- The Mercedes-Benz Stadium Art Collection
- Peggy Cooper Cafritz Collection, Duke Ellington School of Arts, Washington DC
- The Escalette Permanent Collection of Art at Chapman University
- The Corning Museum of Glass, Corning, NY
- The Lowe Art Museum, Miami, FL
- The Ueshima Museum Collection, Japan
- Yusaku Maezawa Collection, Japan
- Scripps College, Ruth Chalder Williamson Collection

== Awards and collaborations ==
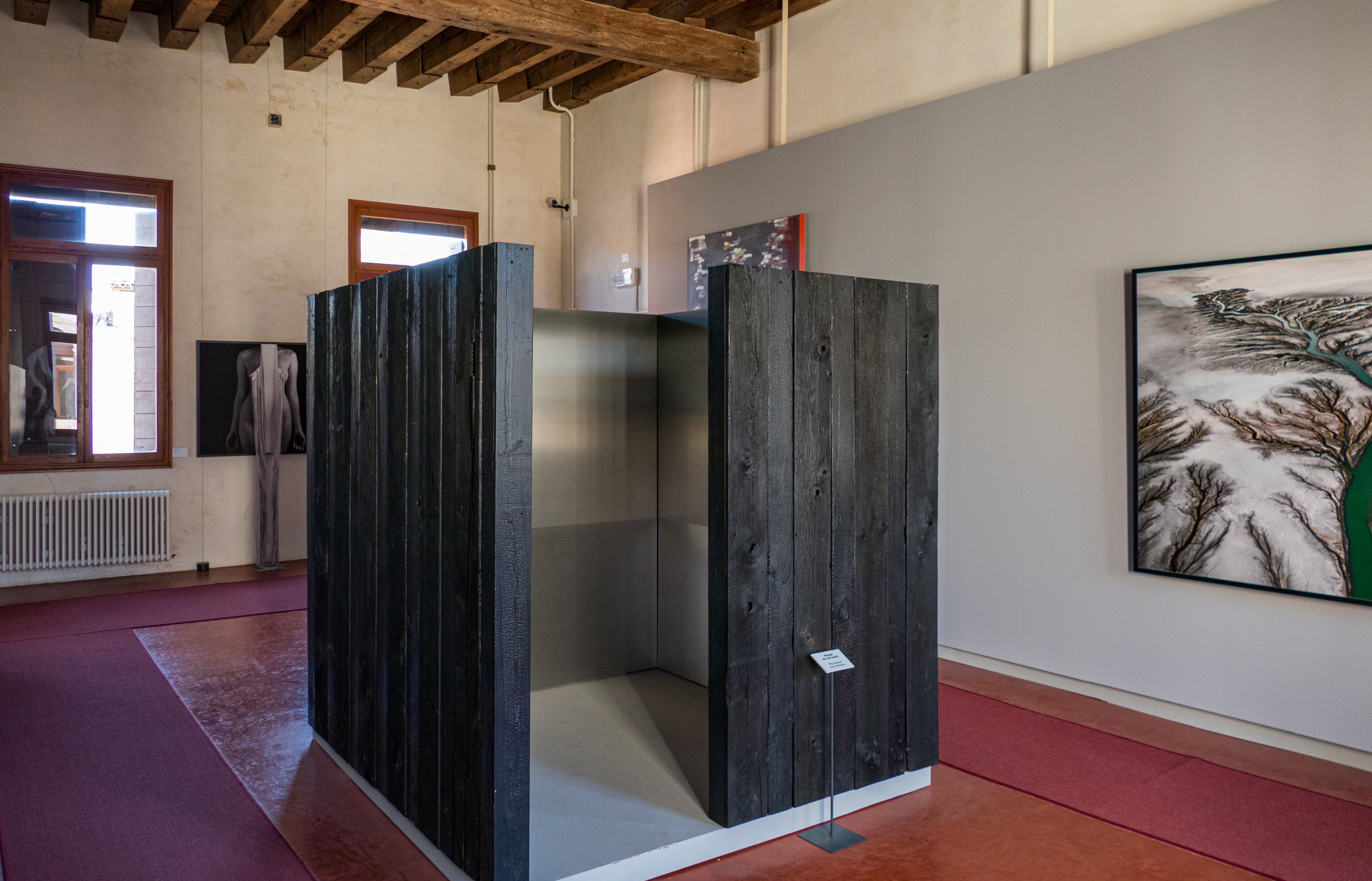
Ando's Shou-Sugi-Ban

Ando has received numerous grants and awards, including the Pollock-Krasner Foundation Grant Award and Commission for the Philip Johnson Glass House, New Canaan, CT. In 2013, she was commissioned by Bang Olufsen to showcase her bespoke hand-dyed, anodized watercolor technique on a limited edition speaker collection. In 2015, Ando's sculpture Shou Sugi Ban, was featured in Frontiers Reimagined, a group exhibition at the Palazzo Grimani di Santa Maria Formosa Museum during the 56th Venice Biennale. In 2025 Miya Ando collaborated with Saint Laurent and held an exhibition titled: "Mono no aware" at Saint Laurent Rive Droite, Los Angeles curated by YSL creative director Anthony Vaccarello.

== Personal life ==
Ando spent part of her childhood in a Buddhist temple in Japan, as well as on 25 acres of the Santa Cruz Mountains' redwood forest in rural coastal Northern California.

After graduating magna cum laude from University of California, Berkeley with a degree in East Asian studies, she attended Yale University and Stanford University to study Buddhist iconography and imagery, before apprenticing with a master metalsmith in Japan.

She is a 16th-generation descendant of Bizen sword maker Ando Yoshiro Masakatsu.

Ando lives in Manhattan, New York, and has a studio in Long Island City.
