= Sheena & The Rokkets =

Japanese rock band

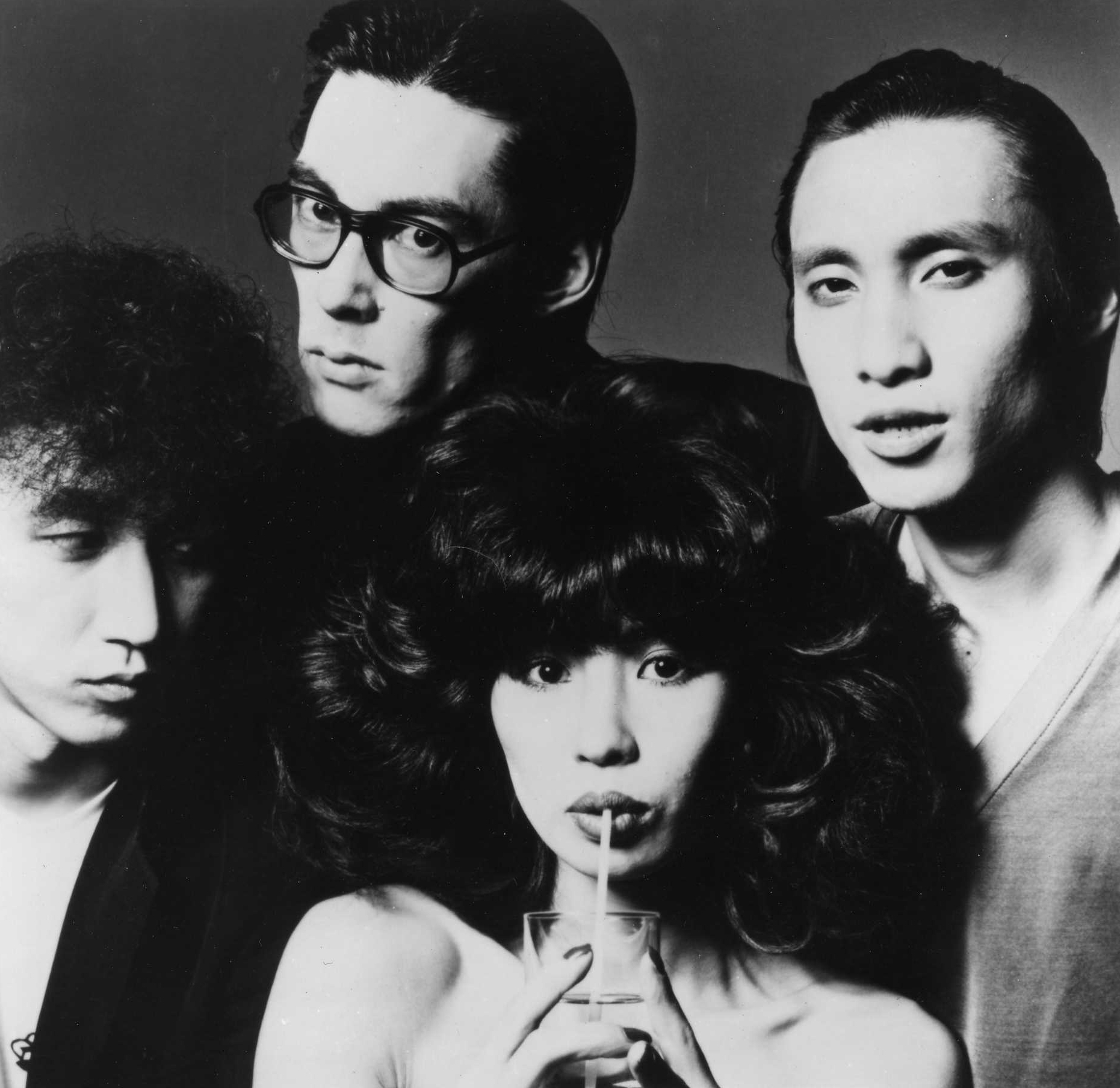
- Sheena & The Rokkets in 1981. Clockwise from Top: Makoto Ayukawa, Takeshi Asada, Etsuko "Sheena" Ayukawa, Kazuhide Kawashima

Background information
- Origin: Fukuoka, Japan
- Genres: Rock, new wave
- Years active: 1978–present
- Labels: JVC Victor /Speedsatr; production: Rock et Duction
- Members: Kazuhide Kawashima; Toshihiro Nara
- Past members: Sheena; Makoto Ayukawa
- Website: http://rokkets.com/

Sheena & The Rokkets (シーナ&ザ・ロケッツ, Shīna & Za Rokettsu) is a Japanese rock band, formed in 1978. They are one of the most popular acts in the Mentai Rock scene.

In September 2007, Rolling Stone Japan rated their album Vacuum Pack number 44 on its list of the "100 Greatest Japanese Rock Albums of All Time". Their singles, "You May Dream", "Lazy Crazy Blues", "Omae-ga Hoshii [I want you]", "Pin-up Baby Blues", "Sweet Inspiration", "Rock On Baby (Music; Makoto Ayukawa, Lyrics; ayu yu -阿久悠)" are their most popular hits.

The artists have also made solo recordings. Sheena released her solo album "Beautiful" (Yen Label), Makoto Ayukawa released "Kool-Solo" (ALFA Records) and in 1992, he collaborated with Wilko Johnson (formerly of Dr. Feelgood) on a London recording, released as "LONDON SESSION #1 & #2".

== History ==
After the pioneering Mentai Rock act SONHOUSE broke up in 1978, guitarist Makoto Ayukawa recruited his wife Etsuko for his new project. Forming the word Rokkets from "Rock" and "Etsu", and with Etsuko adopting the name Sheena after the Ramones' song "Sheena Is a Punk Rocker", the band christened themselves Sheena & The Rokkets.

They debuted on November 23, 1978, as the opening act for Elvis Costello's Japan Tour. In 1979, Yellow Magic Orchestra (Haruomi Hosono) produced their 2nd Album Shinkuu Pack "Vacuum Pack". In 1980, they shared four shows with the Ramones in Tokyo. In the same year, their music was used as a soundtrack for an indie film Tokyo Cabbageman K directed by Akira Ogata. In 1981, they were invited by A&M Records in Los Angeles, where they re-recorded an English version, released as "SHEENA & THE ROKKETS IN USA". They collaborated with British musician Wilko Johnson in 1993 and with well-known kayōkyoku lyricist Yū Aku the following year.

On February 14, 2015, Etsuko "Sheena" Ayukawa died from cervical cancer at the age of 61. On January 29, 2023, Makoto Ayukawa died from pancreatic cancer.

== Members ==
- Kazuhide Kawashima (川嶋一秀) (drums) - active 1978-
- Toshihiro Nara (奈良敏博) (bass) - active 1978-

Former

- Sheena (シーナ), real name Etsuko Ayukawa (鮎川悦子) (vocals, tambourine) - active 1978-2015
- Takeshi Asada (bass) - joined in 1979. Left around 1987. Re-Joined in 2008 - 2011
- Makoto Ayukawa (鮎川誠) (guitar, vocals) - active 1978 - 2023

== Discography ==
=== Singles ===
1. 涙のハイウェイ [Namidano Highway /Koiwa No No No] Elbon BON-1014(1978-10-25)
2. ユー・メイ・ドリーム [You may dream /Lazy Crazy Blues] Alfa ALR-1019(1979-12-5) -- this song was broadcast on Fujii TVs Night Hit Studio on 1980-05-12 --- it was their first big hit.
3. ベイビー・メイビー [Baby Maybe /Hot Line] Alfa ALR-705(1980-10-21)
4. 浮びのビーチ・ガール [Ukabino Peach Girl /Radio Junk] Alfa ALR-719(1980-11-21)
5. キス・ミー・クイック [Kiss-Me-Quick /Moonlight Dance] Alfa ALR-723(1980-12-21)
6. ピンナップ・ベイビー・ブルース [Pinup Baby Blues /Krazy Kool Kat] Alfa ALR-737(1981-7-21)
7. スイート・インスピレーション [Sweet Inspiration /Koiwo Shiyouze] Victor VIHX-1643(1984-9-21)
8. 今夜はたっぷり [Konyawa Tappuri /Let's Go Plaza] Victor VIHX-1665(1985-5-21)
9. ABC [ABC /Time Limited Bomb] Victor VIHX-1697(1986-8-21)
10. どうしても逢いたい [Doshitemo Aitai /Sunny] Victor VIHX-1716(1987-6-21)
11. ハッピーハウス [HAPPY HOUSE /Poison] Victor VIHX-1747 (1988-7-21)
12. エンジェル・アイズANGEL EYES /I Gotta Move] Victor VIHX-1769 (1989-4-21)
13. パーマネント・ハネムーン [PERMANENT HONEYMOON /Glory Of Love] Victor VIHX-1774 (1989-5-21)
14. (ハ！ハ！ハ！）ハードドラッグ [(Ha! Ha! Ha!) Hard Drug /I Like It(Frankenstein)] Speedstar VIDL-103(1992-6-21)
15. ロックの好きなベイビー抱いて [Rock On Baby /Daughter Of Witch] Speedstar VIDL-172(1994-3-24)
16. インターネット・キッス [Internet Kiss /Beautiful(English version)] Speedstar VIDL-30036 (1997-8-6)

=== Albums ===
1. Sheena & the Rokkets #1 (1979)
2. 真空パック (Vacuum Pack) [1979]
3. Channel Good (1980)
4. Pinup Baby Blues (1981)
5. Sheena & the Rokkets (1981)
6. New Hippies (1984)
7. Main Songs (1985)
8. Gathered (1986)
9. Captain Guitar and Baby Rock (1986)
10. #9 (1987)
11. Happy House (1988)
12. Dream + Revolt (1989)
13. (ha!ha!ha!) Hard Drug (1992)
14. Rock on Baby (1994)
15. @Heart(1997)
16. Rock the Rock (2000)
17. Japanik (2008)
18. Rokket Ride (2014)

=== EPs ===
1. Lemon Tea (12" single) (1985)
2. Family Dancing (1990)
3. SHEENA & THE ROKKETS IN THE 90'S (1990)

=== Compilations ===
1. SHEENA & THE ROKKETS Best Selection (1983)
2. Early days (1985)
3. GO GO (1987)
4. The Original Rock'n'Roll Hearts (1988)
5. Rock ia alright (1994)
6. Rock'n'roll heart 2(and roots) (1995)
7. SUPERBEST KOLLECTION (1996)
8. The Very Best (2000)
9. Dream BOX (2003)
10. The Greatest Sheena & The Rokkets (2003)
11. ELECTROKKETS / V.A. (2004)
12. Rokket Factory～the worst and rarities of Sheena & The Rokkets in Alfa years～ (2006-8-23)
13. GOLDEN HITS THE ALFA YEARS (2007-7-25)
14. WHITE BOX SET; INVITATION YEARS 1984-1989 (2009-12-16)
15. BLACK BOX SET; SPEEDSTAR YEARS 1990-2009 (2009-12-16)

=== DVD ===
1. ライブ帝国 [Live Empire] FUKUOKA ROCK INVASION (2003)
2. ROKKET PARANOIA(ROKKET SIZE・VIDEO VERSION) (2004)
3. LOVE LIVE (2004)
4. SPACE SHOWER ARCHIVE シーナ&ザ・ロケッツ [SHEENA & THE ROKKETS] LIVE 9207 (2007-2-23)

== See also ==
- Yellow Magic Orchestra
