= Osamu Abe (baseball) =

Japanese baseball player and coach

- Coach
- Born: December 19, 1962 (age 63); Miyagi, Japan
- Batted: Right Threw: Right

debut
- May 11, 1984, for the Seibu Lions

Last appearance
- September 23, 1999, for the Osaka Kintetsu Buffaloes

Career statistics
- Hits: 458
- Runs batted in: 217
- Batting average: .258
- Stats at Baseball Reference

Teams
- As player: Seibu Lions (1981–1996); Kintetsu Buffaloes/Osaka Kintetsu Buffaloes (1997–1999); As coach: Tohoku Rakuten Golden Eagles (2010–2011); Saitama Seibu Lions (2012–2013); Hanwha Eagles (2014–2015)

Osamu Abe (安部 理, Abe Osamu; born December 19, 1962 in Miyagi, Japan) is a former Nippon Professional Baseball player for the Seibu Lions in Japan's Pacific League.
