= Toshiyuki Ando =

Japanese professional Go player

Personal information
- Native name: 安藤俊行 (Japanese); アンドウトシユキ (Japanese)
- Full name: Toshiyuki Ando
- Born: June 30, 1948 (age 78) Tokyo, Japan

Sport
- Turned pro: 1969
- Teacher: Tomoe Ito
- Rank: 3 dan
- Affiliation: Nihon Ki-in, Tokyo branch

Toshiyuki Ando (安藤 俊行, Andō Toshiyuki; born June 30, 1948) is a Japanese professional Go player.

== Promotion record ==
Rank	Year	Notes
1 dan	1969	
2 dan	1972	
3 dan	1979	
4 dan		
5 dan		
6 dan		
7 dan		
8 dan		
9 dan		
