= Yugoh Amano =

Japanese baseball player (born 1977)

- Infielder
- Born: December 11, 1977 (age 48); Miyagi, Japan
- Bats: Right Throws: Right
- Stats at Baseball Reference

Teams
- Chiba Lotte Marines (1999 – 2005); Lotte Giants (2006)

Yugoh Amano (天野 勇剛, Amano Yūgō; born December 11, 1977 in Miyagi, Japan) is a former Nippon Professional Baseball player for the Chiba Lotte Marines of Japan's Pacific League.
