= Toyozō Arakawa =

Japanese ceramic potter (1894–1985)

Toyozo Arakawa (荒川 豊蔵, Arakawa Toyozō; March 21, 1894 - August 11, 1985) was a well-known Japanese ceramic potter.

He lived and worked in Mino, near Nagoya. He was given the title "Living National Treasure" in 1955.

In 1930 he discovered shards at the site of the ruins of an ogama style kiln at Mutabora proving that that Shino and Oribe glazed work of the Momoyama and early Edo period in Japan had been manufactured in Mino rather than in the Seto area. In 1933 he built a kiln reproducing the original Mutabora kiln and rediscovered the techniques for manufacturing Shino glazes.

He died in Tokyo, Japan in 1985.

There is a translation of Arakawa's The Traditions and Techniques of Mino Pottery in Janet Barriskill's Visiting the Mino Kilns Wild Peony Press, Sydney, 1995.

His work is kept in several museums, including the Mills College Art Museum, the Victoria and Albert Museum, the Portland Art Museum, the ASU Art Museum, the Brooklyn Museum, the Seattle Art Museum, the Minneapolis Institute of Art, and the University of Michigan Museum of Art.
