= Shogo Arai (baseball) =

Japanese baseball player (born 1972)

Shogo Arai (荒井 昭吾, Arai Shōgo; born July 21, 1972, Nerima Ward, Tokyo, Japan) is a Japanese former professional baseball infielder. He played for the Nippon-Ham Fighters in the Pacific League from 1994 to 1998.
