= Tatsuo Arai =

Japanese engineer

Tatsuo Arai is a Japanese engineer from the Osaka University, Osaka, Japan was named a Fellow of the Institute of Electrical and Electronics Engineers (IEEE) in 2016 for contributions to micro manipulators and sensors, and applications to cellular biology.
