= Shintarō Arakawa =

Japanese linguist (born 1971)

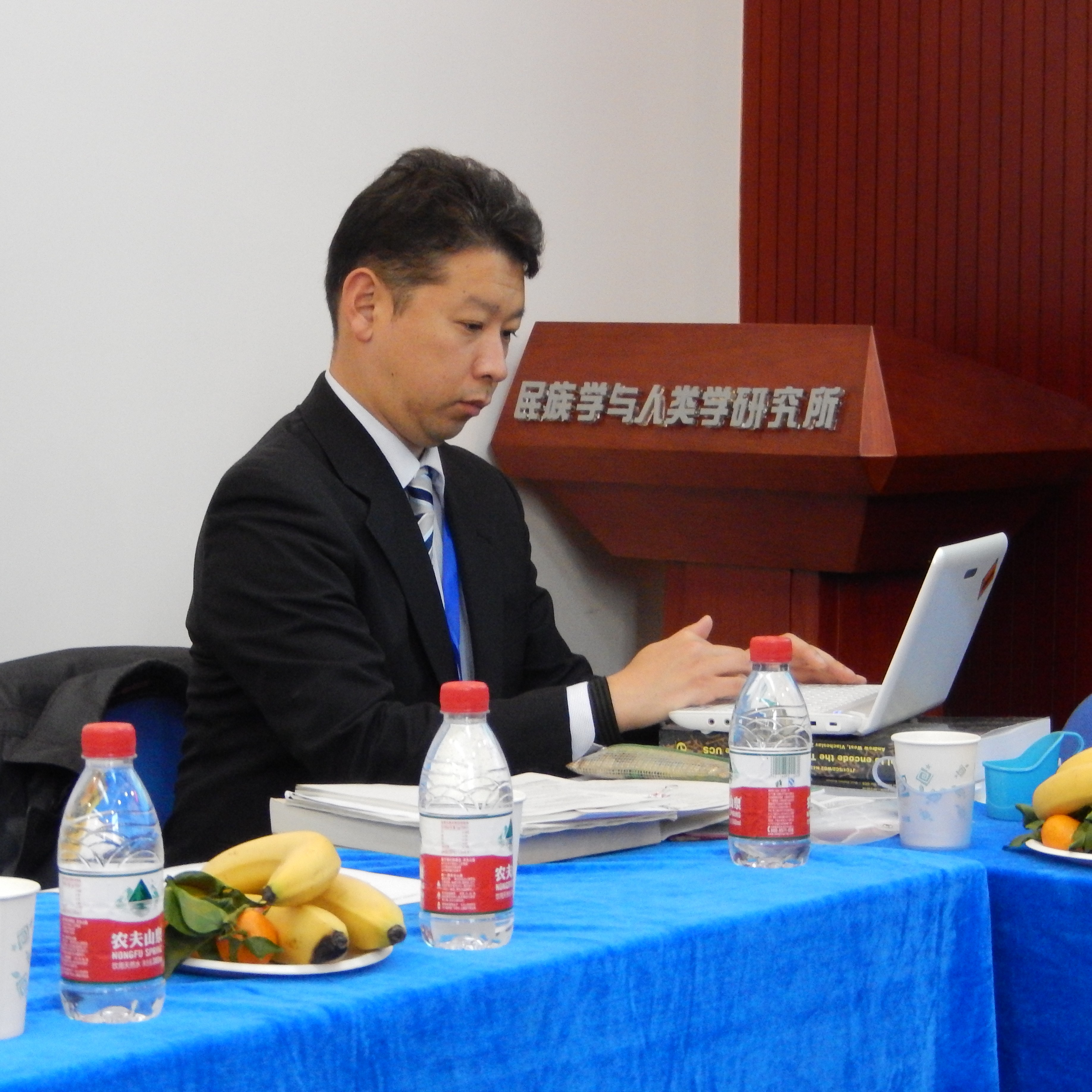
- Arakawa at the International Tangut Encoding Conference in Beijing, December 2013
- Born: May 1971 (age 55)
- Citizenship: Japan
- Education: Kyoto University
- Known for: Study of Tangut language
- Scientific career
- Fields: Linguistics

Shintarō Arakawa (荒川 慎太郎, Arakawa Shintarō; born May 1971) is a Japanese linguist who specializes in the study of the extinct Tangut language.

== Biography ==
Arakawa graduated from the Faculty of Letters at Kyoto University in 1995. He stayed on for graduate studies at Kyoto University, from where he received his doctorate in 2002. Since 2003 he has been teaching at Tokyo University of Foreign Studies, with the position of associate professor since 2007.

Arakawa specialises in the study of the Tangut language, in particular Tangut phonology and the reconstruction of the pronunciation of Tangut characters. In 2006 he co-edited a Tangut-Russian-English-Chinese dictionary with Evgenij Ivanovich Kychanov, for which he provided the reconstructed Tangut readings. He has also published a number of studies of bilingual Tangut-Tibetan texts.

In 2016 Arakawa received the prestigious Kyōsuke Kindaichi Memorial Award (金田一京助博士記念賞) for his study of the Tangut version of the Diamond Sutra.

== Works ==
- 1997. "Seikago tsūin jiten" 西夏語通韻字典 [Tangut Rhyme Dictionary]; in Gengogaku Kenkyū言語学研究 [Linguistic Research] 16: 1–153.
- 1999. "Kazō taion shiryō kara mita Seikago no seichō" 夏藏対音資料からみた西夏語の声調 [A Study on Tangut Tones from Tibetan Transcriptions]; in Gengogaku Kenkyū 言語学研究 [Linguistic Research] 17–18: 27-44.
- 2001. "Seikago no kyakuin ni mirareru inbo ni tsuite 'San shi shu ming yan ji wen' shoshū seikagoshi" 西夏語の脚韻に見られる韻母について—『三世属明言集文』所収西夏語詩 [About the rhymes in Tangut verses: Reanalysis of Tangut rhyming poetry in San shi shu ming yan ji wen]; in Kyōto daigaku gengogaku kenkyū 京都大学言語学研究 [Linguistic Research of the Kyoto University] 20: 195–224.
- 2002. Seika-bun Kongō-kyō no kenkyū [Studies in the Tangut Version of the Vajracchedikā Prajñāpāramitā]. D. Litt dissertation. Kyoto University.
- 2003. "Tokyō daigaku shozō Seikabun danpen ni tsuite - Seikago yaku 'Daichidoron' danpen" 東京大学所蔵西夏文断片について - 西夏語訳『大智度論』断片 [Tangut Fragments preserved in the University of Tokyo—The Tangut Version of the Mahāprajñāpāramitopadeśa]; in Kyōto daigaku gengogaku kenkyū 京都大学言語学研究 [Linguistic Research of the Kyoto University] 22: 379–390.
- 2006. With E. I. Kychanov. Словарь тангутского (Си Ся) языка: тангутско-русско-англо-китайский словарь [Tangut-Russian-English-Chinese Dictionary]. Kyoto: Faculty of Letters, Tokyo University.
- 2008. "Daiē toshokan shozō Ka-Zō taion shiryō Or. 12380/3495 ni tsuite" 大英図書館所蔵夏蔵対音資料Or. 12380/3495 について [Tangut Buddhist fragment with Tibetan transcriptions: Or. 12380/3495 preserved in British Library]; in Kyōto daigaku gengogaku kenkyū 京都大学言語学研究 [Kyoto University Linguistic Research] 27: 203–212.
- 2012. "On the Tangut Verb Prefixes in 'Tiancheng Code'"; in Irina Fedorovna Popova (ed.), Тангуты в Центральной Азии: сборник статей в честь 80-летия проф. Е.И.Кычанова [Tanguts in Central Asia: a collection of articles marking the 80th anniversary of Prof. E. I. Kychanov] pp. 58–71. Moscow: Oriental Literature. ISBN 978-5-02-036505-6
- 2012. "Re-analysis of 'Tangut-Tibetan' Phonological Materials"; in Nathan W. Hill (ed.), Medieval Tibeto-Burman Languages IV. Brill, 2012. ISBN 9789004232020
- 2018. Tangut Version of the Lotus Sutra in the Collection of Princeton University Library プリンストン大学図書館所蔵西夏文妙法蓮華経. Soka Gakkai, 2018. ISBN 9784884170943
- 日本的契丹文字、契丹語研究－従豊田五郎先生和西田龍雄先生的業績談起, 華西語文学刊, 8巻, 44–48, 2013年
- Заслуги Н. А. Невского в исследовании тангутскогоязыка, Николай Невский: жизнь и наследие, 157-169, 2013年
- On the Draft of a Tangut "Stone Launcher" -Tang. 46 inv. No. 156 (2006) st. inv. No. 5217 preserved in Oriental Manuscripts Institute, Russian Academy of Sciences-, Письменные памятники Востока, 2012年
- プリンストン大学所蔵西夏文仏典断片(Pearld)について, Journal of Asian and African Studies, 83号, 5--36, 2012年
- 河西地域石窟の西夏文題記に関する覚書（3）, 東ユーラシア出土文献研究通信, 3号, 2013年
- Re-analysis of the Tangut verb phrase based on a study of the word order, 西夏学, 9巻, 290–297, 2014年
- On the Tangut verb phrase in The Sea of Meaning, Established by the Saints, Central Asiatic Journal, 57巻, 15–25, 2014年
- 内蒙古博物院，考古所収蔵西夏文文献, 北方文化研究, 6巻, 191–197, 2015年
- 古代文字文献を資料とした死言語の文法研究－中エジプト語・契丹語・シュメール語・西夏語の事例から－, 日本言語学会第151回大会予稿集, 342–343, 2015年
- 西夏語の文法研究－各種資料からみた文法語を例に－, 日本言語学会第151回大会予稿集, 362–367, 2015年
- 西夏語の3種の遠称指示代名詞の使い分けについて, 言語研究, 148巻, 103–121, 2015年
- 西夏末期における仏典の奥書について, 研究成果報告書（学術助成基金助成金 基盤研究(C)研究代表者：佐藤貴保）「西夏語文献から見た、モンゴル軍侵攻期における西夏王国の防衛体制・仏教信仰の研究」, 2015年
- On the design of a "Trebuchet" in the Tangut Manuscript of IOM, RAS, Written Monuments of the Orient, 2号, 21–30, 2015年
- 西夏語の名詞句構造について, シナ=チベット系諸言語の文法現象1：名詞句の構造, 57–72, 2016年
- 河西地域石窟の西夏文題記に関する覚書（4）, 研究成果報告書（科学研究費補助金 挑戦的萌芽研究 研究代表者：荒川慎太郎）「ロシア所蔵資料の実見調査に基づく西夏文字草書体の体系的研究」, 2016年
- 2014年における『文字鏡』西夏文字フォントの修正と追加について, 研究成果報告書（科学研究費補助金 挑戦的萌芽研究 研究代表者：荒川慎太郎）「ロシア所蔵資料の実見調査に基づく西夏文字草書体の体系的研究」, 2016年
- 西夏の「砲」設計図について, 研究成果報告書（科学研究費補助金 挑戦的萌芽研究 研究代表者：荒川慎太郎）「ロシア所蔵資料の実見調査に基づく西夏文字草書体の体系的研究」, 2016年
