= Ashikaga Satouji =

Ashikaga Satouji (足利 聡氏; 6 May 1857 - 1921?) was a Japanese samurai of the late Edo period who served as lord of the Kitsuregawa Domain (Shimotsuke Province). A direct descendant of the Ashikaga shōguns, Satouji had 5000 koku income and was a Tokugawa retainer, but had the de facto status of a daimyō of 100,000 koku-level income. He was ousted as he had squandered Kitsuregawa domain finance, and his adopted son Otomaru became a viscount (子爵, shishaku) in the Meiji era. He became a primary school teacher.
