= Ryohei Arai =

Ryohei Arai may refer to:

- Ryohei Arai (director) (荒井 良平, 1901–1980), Japanese film director
- Ryohei Arai (footballer) (新井 涼平, born 1990), Japanese footballer
- Ryohei Arai (javelin thrower) (新井 涼平, born 1991), Japanese javelin thrower
- Ryōhei Arai (新井 良平, born 1987), Japanese voice actor
