= Ryo Asai =

Japanese baseball player

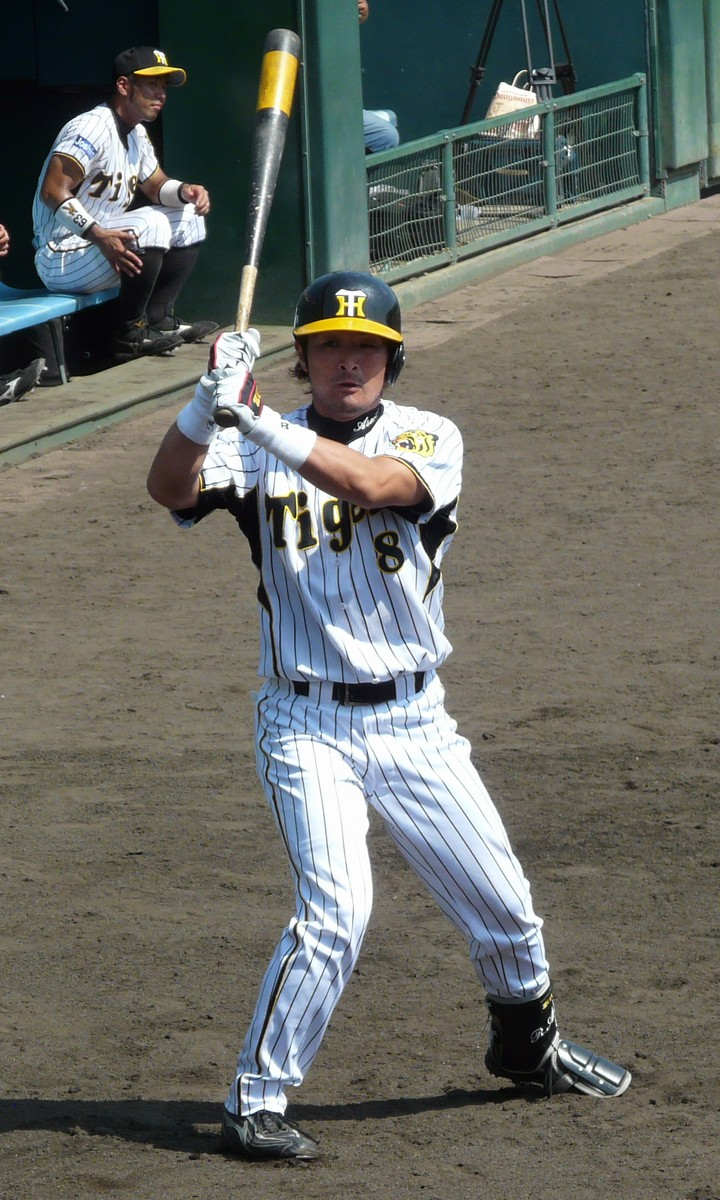
- Outfielder / Catcher
- Born: July 19, 1979 (age 46); Yokohama, Kanagawa Japan
- Batted: Right Threw: Right

NPB debut
- May 1, 2002, for the Hanshin Tigers

Last NPB appearance
- September 21, 2013, for the Hanshin Tigers

NPB statistics (through 2013)
- Batting average: .249
- Home runs: 12
- Hits: 171

Teams
- As player: Hanshin Tigers (2002–2013)
- Last updated on: 4 February 2017

Ryo Asai (浅井 良, Asai Ryō) (born July 19, 1979) is a former baseball player in Japan. Asai primarily played with the Hanshin Tigers in the Central League. He also played baseball for the Waikiki BeachBoys.
