= Shinji Ando =

Japanese baseball player (born 1970)

Shinji Ando (安藤 真児, Andō Shinji) (born September 2, 1970) is a former professional baseball player based in Japan. He played second and first base for the Seibu Lions of the Japan Pacific League.
