= Yutaka Ashikaga =

Japanese baseball player (born 1968)

- Pitcher
- Born: October 15, 1968 (age 57); Kawabe District, Akita, Japan
- Batted: Left Threw: Left

Professional debut
- NPB: May 29, 1991, for the Fukuoka Daiei Hawks
- CPBL: August 27, 1999, for the Mercuries Tigers

Last appearance
- NPB: August 26, 1995, for the Fukuoka Daiei Hawks
- CPBL: October 24, 1999, for the Mercuries Tigers

NPB statistics
- Win–loss record: 13–20
- Earned run average: 4.37
- Strikeouts: 155

CPBL statistics
- Win–loss record: 0–0
- Earned run average: 1.32
- Strikeouts: 13

Teams
- Fukuoka Daiei Hawks (1991–1995); Mercuries Tigers (1999)

Yutaka Ashikaga (born October 15, 1968) is a Japanese former professional baseball pitcher. He played in Nippon Professional Baseball (NPB) for the Fukuoka Daiei Hawks and in the Chinese Professional Baseball League (CPBL) for the Mercuries Tigers
