= Manabu Andoh =

Japanese baseball player (born 1967)

Manabu Andoh (安藤 学, Andō Manabu; born May 29, 1967 in Nagoya) is a Japanese former professional baseball player. He played for the Chiba Lotte Marines of the Pacific League in 1994 and 1995.
