= Norihiro Akimura =

Japanese baseball player (born 1966)

- Pitcher
- Born: February 26, 1966 (age 60); Yamaguchi, Japan
- Bats: Right Throws: Right

debut
- April 7, 1990, for the Hiroshima Toyo Carp
- Stats at Baseball Reference

Teams
- Hiroshima Toyo Carp (1990 – 1995); Nippon Ham Fighters (1996 – 1997)

Norihiro Akimura (秋村 謙宏, Akimura Norihiro; born February 26, 1966 in Yamaguchi, Japan) is a retired Japanese Nippon Professional Baseball pitcher. He played for the Hiroshima Toyo Carp and the Nippon Ham Fighters.

== Baseball career ==
=== High school ===
In the summer of 1982, in his sophomore year, Akimura achieved consecutive no-hit, no-run games against Iwakuni High School in the quarterfinals of the Yamaguchi Prefectural Qualifying Tournament (five innings) and against Hagiwagi High School in the semifinals. In the finals, the team also closed out Shimonoseki Sho to qualify for the summer championship. However, they lost to Takaoka Sho in the second round (first game). In the following spring, 1983, he was defeated by Takeshi Yamada of Kurume Sho in the first round of the Spring National Championships. In the summer championship of the same year, they advanced to the quarterfinals, but lost to Yokohama Sho, which had Masaaki Miura as its pitcher. In the third round of this tournament, he hit his 23rd home run of the tournament off Mitsuru Ogiwara of Sendai Sho (later Tokai University).

=== University ===
After graduating from high school in 1984, Matsumoto went on to Hosei University. He won the Tokyo Rokugaku Daigaku Baseball League championship four times during his time there, and although he experienced league play from his freshman year, he lost 1–10 to Hideki Asaki in the second round of the 1984 spring tournament when he hit a grand slam homer (the first by a Tokyo University player) in the second inning. The next day, in the third round, Hōhō University beat Todai 17–1. With Yoshiaki Nishikawa, the main pitcher, two years above him and Takashi Inomata and Takehiro Ishii, both pitchers, one year above him, he had few opportunities to pitch as an underclassman. However, in his senior year, he won the 1987 Fall League championship as the ace, and was selected as one of the best nine pitchers of that season. In the 18th Meiji Jingu Baseball Tournament that year, he lost in the final to the University of Tsukuba, which had pitchers Masakazu Watanabe and Akinori Kobayashi, after a heated 10-inning extra-inning battle. He pitched 33 games in the league and went 14–1 with a 3.01 earned-run average and 96 strikeouts. His college classmates include Toshio Suzuki and Tatsunori Matsui, and pitcher Minoru Kasai is two years younger than him.

=== Corporate baseball ===
After graduating from college in 1988, he joined the Nippon Oil Corporation baseball team and participated in the 1989 Inter-City Baseball Tournament, starting the first game against NTT Hokkaido, but was hit by a pitch in the fourth inning, and the team lost to Matsushita Electric in the second game.

=== Professional baseball ===
Akimura played for the Hiroshima Carp from 1990 - 1995, and for the Nippon Ham Fighters from 1996 - 1997.
