= Yuta Arakawa =

Japanese baseball player (born 1987)

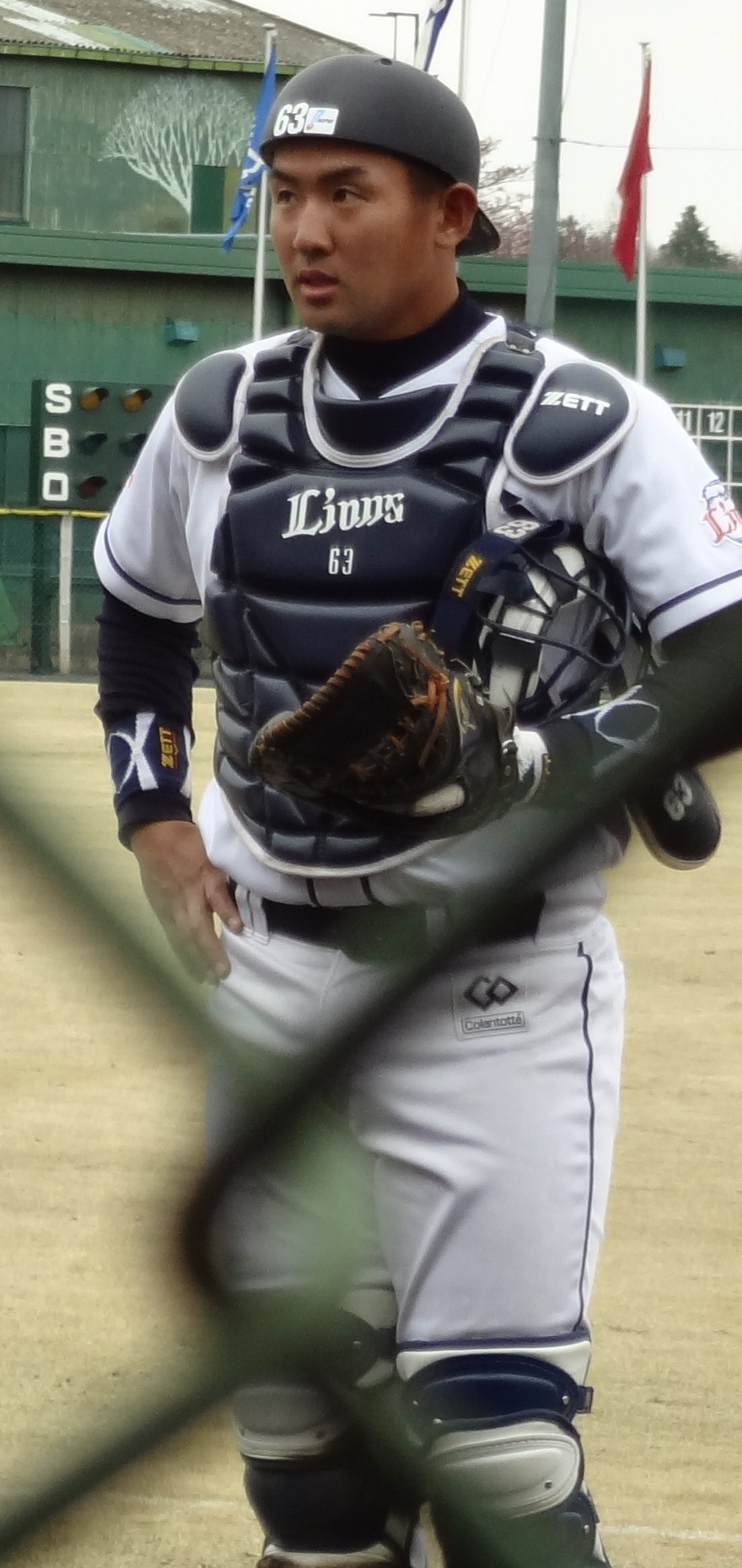
- Arakawa with the Saitama Seibu Lions

Saitama Seibu Lions – No. 98
- Catcher / Coach
- Born: October 14, 1987 (age 38); Ōta, Tokyo
- Bats: Right Throws: Right

NPB statistics (through 2012 season)
- Batting average: .185
- Home runs: 7
- Runs batted in: 30

Teams
- As player: Fukuoka SoftBank Hawks (2006–2010); Saitama Seibu Lions (2011–2012); As coach: Saitama Seibu Lions (2023-present)
- Last updated on: January 3, 2023

Yuta Arakawa (荒川 雄太, Arakawa Yūta) is a Japanese former professional baseball player who was a catcher in Nippon Professional Baseball (NPB). He played for the Fukuoka SoftBank Hawks from 2008–2010 and the Saitama Seibu Lions in 2011 and 2012.
