= Toshinori Asanuma =

Japanese baseball player (born 1989)

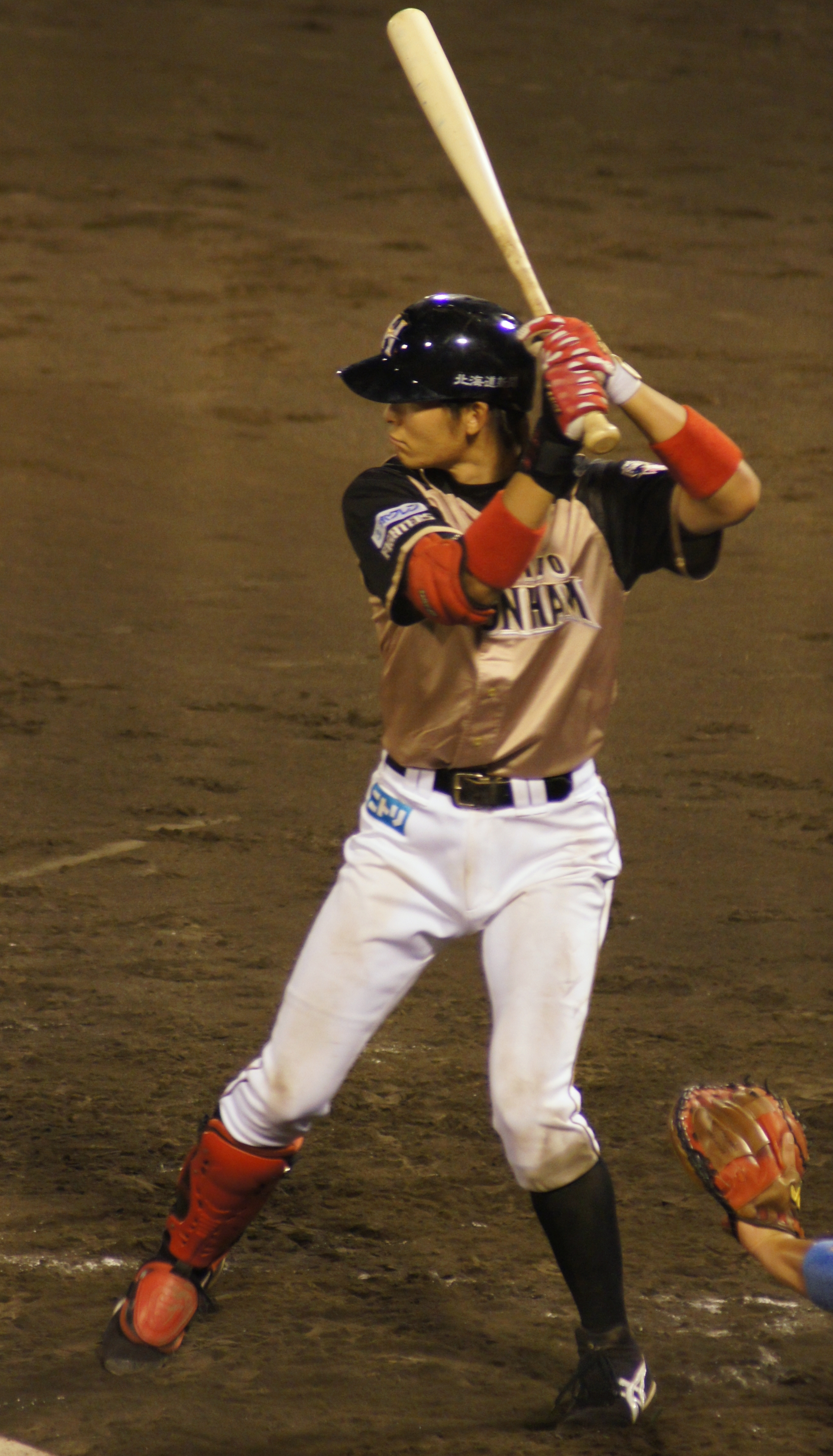
- Outfielder
- Born: July 21, 1989 (age 36)
- Bats: Left Throws: Left

debut
- 2013, for the Hokkaido Nippon-Ham Fighters

Career statistics (through 2013 season)
- Runs: 3
- Hits: 2
- AVG: .500
- Stats at Baseball Reference

Teams
- Hokkaido Nippon-Ham Fighters (2006, 2008, 2010–2013)

Toshinori Asanuma (浅沼 寿紀, Asanuma Toshinori; born 21 July 1989) is a Japanese former professional baseball player. He was drafted in 2007 by the Hokkaido Nippon-Ham Fighters, but did not make his professional debut until 2013. He had 2 runs in 2013,
