= Ashikaga Athletic Stadium =

Athletic stadium in Ashikaga, Tochigi, Japan

Ashikaga Athletic stadium
- 足利市総合運動公園陸上競技場
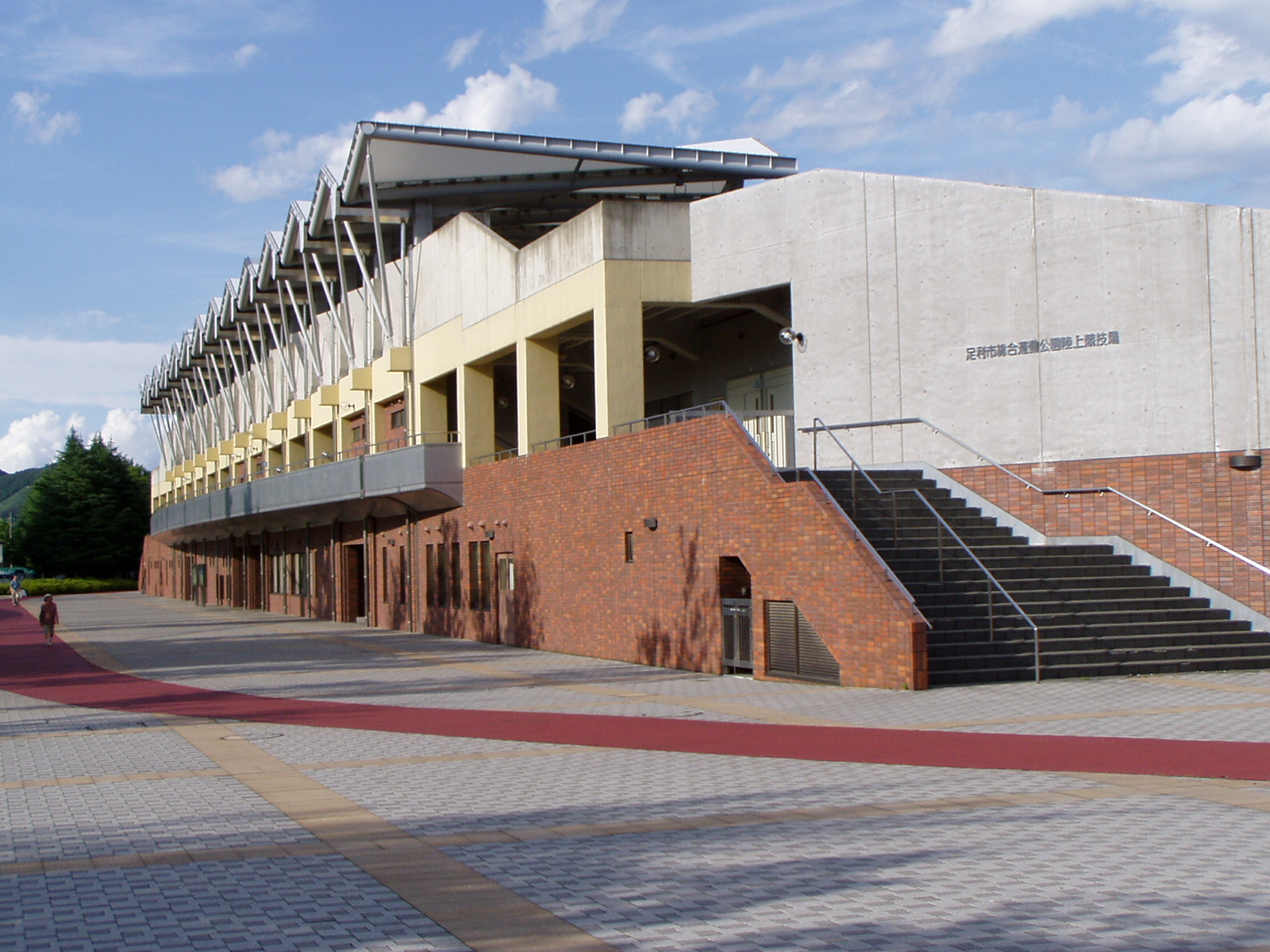
- Interactive map of Ashikaga Athletic stadium
- Location: Ashikaga, Tochigi, Japan
- Coordinates: 36.344815°N 139.4608672°E
- Owner: Ashikaga City
- Capacity: 7,500

Construction
- Opened: 1947

Tenants
- Tochigi SC; Tochigi Uva FC

Website
- Official site

Ashikaga Athletic stadium (足利市総合運動公園陸上競技場) is an athletic stadium in Ashikaga, Tochigi, Japan.

It was used J2 League games.
