= Nobuaki Arai =

Japanese baseball player (born 1973)

Nobuaki Arai (荒井 修光, Arai Nobuaki, born August 11, 1973 in Abiko, Chiba) is a Japanese former professional baseball catcher. He played for Nippon Ham Fighters in the Japan Pacific League in parts of five seasons from 1996 to 2002.
