= Yoshifumi Ayukawa =

Japanese baseball player (born 1970)

- Infielder
- Born: April 2, 1970 (age 56); Aichi, Japan
- Batted: Left Threw: Right

debut
- June 13, 1990, for the Hanshin Tigers

Last appearance
- 2000, for the Chiba Lotte Marines
- Stats at Baseball Reference

Teams
- Hanshin Tigers (1989 – 1996); Chiba Lotte Marines (1997 – 2000)

Yoshifumi Ayukawa (鮎川 義文, Ayukawa Yoshifumi; born April 2, 1970 in Aichi, Japan) is a retired Nippon Professional Baseball pitcher. He played for the Hanshin Tigers and the Chiba Lotte Marines.
