= Kosaku Akimoto =

Japanese baseball player (born 1968)

- Catcher / Coach
- Born: January 29, 1968 (age 58); Tokyo, Japan
- Batted: Right Threw: Right

debut
- April 25, 1990, for the Yokohama Taiyō Whales

Last appearance
- September 25, 2000, for the Yokohama BayStars

NPB statistics (through 2000 season)
- Batting average: .215
- Hits: 230
- RBIs: 108
- Home runs: 16

Teams
- As player: Seibu Lions (1987–1989); Yokohama Taiyo Whales/Yokohama BayStars (1990–2000); As coach: Yokohama BayStars (2001–2010); Saitama Seibu Lions (2011–2021)

Kosaku Akimoto (秋元 宏作, Akimoto Kōsaku; born January 29, 1968) is a retired Nippon Professional Baseball catcher. He used to play for the Yokohama BayStars.
