= Saitama Prefectural Assembly =

Government body

Saitaima Prefectural Assembly 埼玉県議会

Type
- Type: Unicameral

Leadership
- Chairman: Takashi Kinoshita, LDP
- Vice Chairman: Masaru Okachi, LDP

Structure
- Seats: 93
- Political groups: Government (30) Kenminkaigi (14) Minshu Forum (9) JCP (6) Independent (1) Opposition (59) LDP (49) Kōmeitō (9) Kaikaku (1) Vacant (4)

Elections
- Last election: 7 April 2019

Meeting place
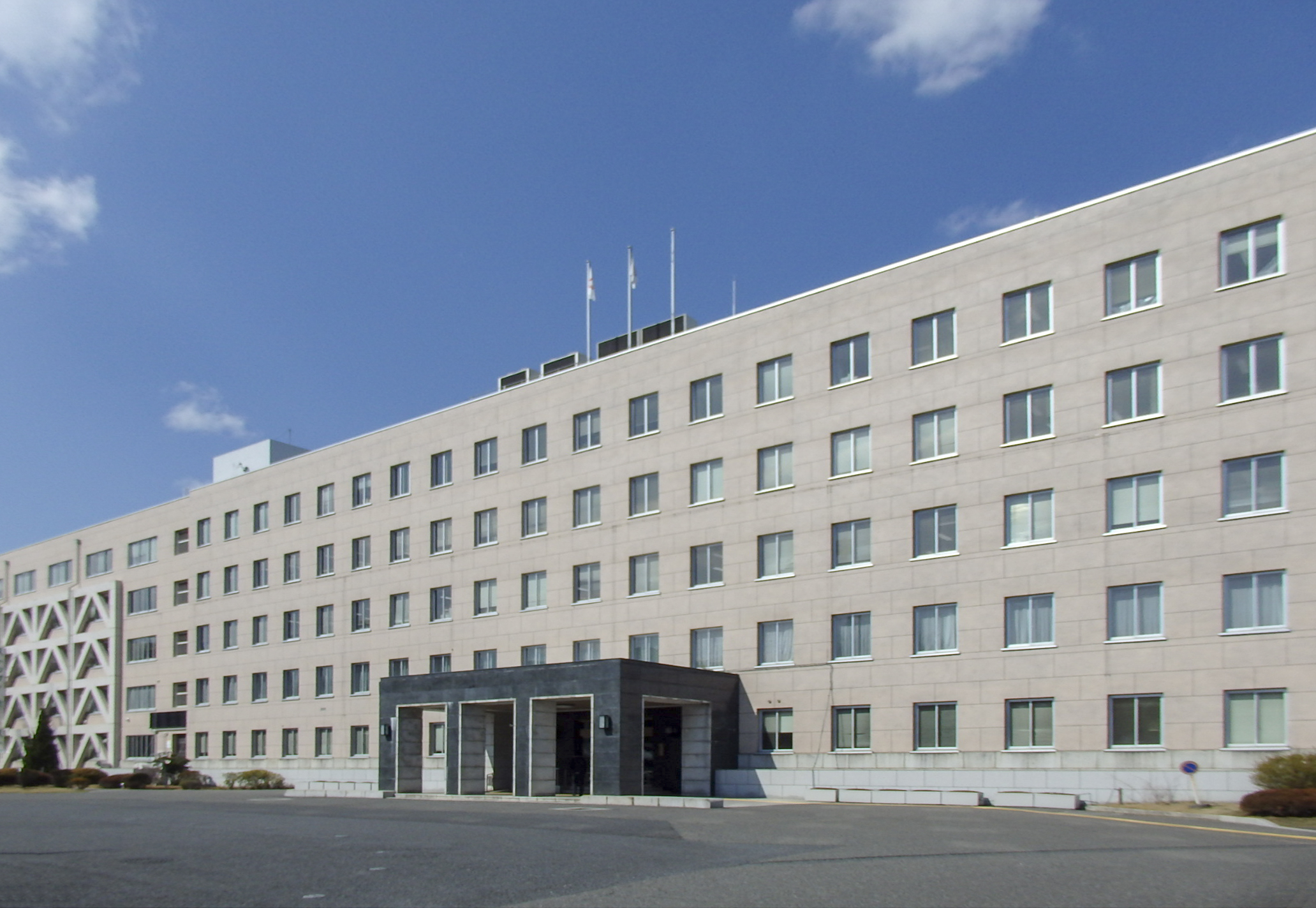

Website
- www.pref.saitama.lg.jp/s-gikai/index.html

The Saitama Prefectural Assembly (埼玉県議会, Saitama-ken Gikai) is the prefectural parliament of Saitama Prefecture.

== Current composition ==
As of 2021, the assembly was composed as follows:

Composition of the Saitama Prefectural Assembly
Parliamentary group	Seats
Liberal Democratic Party	49
Kenminkaigi (Independents)	14
Minshu Forum (CDP/DPFP/Saitamaken Shimin Network)	9
Kōmeitō	9
Japanese Communist Party	6
Kaikaku (Independent)	1
Independents	1
Vacant	4
Total (including vacant seats)	93

== Organisation ==
=== President and Vice-President ===
- President: Takashi Kinoshita (LDP), elected from Sakado
- Vice-President: Masaru Okachi (LDP), elected from Okegawa
