= 2023 Women's Softball Asia Cup =

International softball tournament

Tournament details
- Host country: South Korea
- Teams: 9
- Venue: 1 (in 1 host city)

Final positions
- Champions: Japan (8th title)
- Runner-up: China
- Third place: Chinese Taipei
- Fourth place: Philippines

The 2023 Women's Softball Asia Cup is an international softball tournament which featured nine nations and was held from 2–8 April 2023 in Incheon, South Korea. Matches were held at the Songdo LNG Baseball Stadium.

The tournament also served as the qualifiers for the 2024 Women's Softball World Cup, which is being hosted by Ireland, Italy, and Spain.

== Participants ==
- China
- Hong Kong
- India
- Japan
- South Korea (hosts)
- Philippines
- Singapore
- Chinese Taipei
- Thailand

== Preliminary round ==
Pos	Team	Pld	W	L	RF	RA	RD	PCT	GB	Qualification
1	Japan	8	8	0	102	1	+101	1.000	—	Advance to Final
2	China	8	7	1	87	8	+79	.875	1	Advance to Final
3	Chinese Taipei	8	6	2	70	20	+50	.750	2	Advance to Bronze medal game
4	Philippines	8	5	3	40	21	+19	.625	3	Advance to Bronze medal game
5	South Korea (H)	8	4	4	44	33	+11	.500	4	
6	Hong Kong	8	3	5	30	56	−26	.375	5	
7	Singapore	8	2	6	10	82	−72	.250	6	
8	Thailand	8	1	7	9	77	−68	.125	7	
9	India	8	0	8	2	96	−94	.000	8	

Updated to match(es) played on 4 April 2023. Source: WBSC
Rules for classification: 1) Wins/losses; 2) Head to head; 3) Head to head runs against; 4) Runs against; 5) Head to head
(H) Hosts

=== Matches ===
Date	Road	Score	Home
2 April	South Korea	10–0 (4)	Thailand
2 April	Philippines	7–0 (5)	Hong Kong
2 April	Chinese Taipei	19–0 (3)	India
2 April	China	16–1 (3)	Singapore
2 April	South Korea	0–2	Philippines
2 April	Japan	11–0 (4)	Thailand
2 April	Chinese Taipei	10–0 (4)	Hong Kong
2 April	India	0–21 (3)	China
3 April	Japan	25–0 (4)	Singapore
3 April	Chinese Taipei	12–1 (4)	South Korea
3 April	China	5–0	Hong Kong
3 April	Philippines	10–0 (4)	Thailand
3 April	India	1–3	Singapore
3 April	South Korea	15–0 (3)	Hong Kong
3 April	Japan	4–0	China
3 April	Philippines	0–5	Chinese Taipei
4 April	Thailand	2–5	Hong Kong
4 April	India	0–17 (4)	Japan
4 April	Singapore	1–8 (5)	Philippines
4 April	China	7–0 (5)	South Korea
4 April	Japan	8–0 (5)	Chinese Taipei
4 April	South Korea	10–1 (5)	India
4 April	Singapore	5–4 (9)	Thailand
4 April	China	6–2	Philippines
6 April (Note: Fixtures originally scheduled on 5 April were cancelled due to continuous rains. Matches were revised.)	South Korea	8–0 (5)	Singapore
6 April	Japan	17–0 (4)	Hong Kong
6 April	India	0–10 (4)	Philippines
6 April	Thailand	0–15 (3)	Chinese Taipei
6 April	Japan	11–0 (4)	South Korea
6 April	Chinese Taipei	8–0 (5)	Singapore
6 April	China	21–0 (3)	Thailand
6 April	India	0–13 (5)	Hong Kong
7 April	Hong Kong	12–0	Singapore
7 April	Thailand	3–0	India
7 April	Chinese Taipei	1–11	China
7 April	Japan	9–1 (5)	Philippines

== Final round ==
Originally the format was to consist of semi-finals with the winners qualifying for the final. However, after day 4, it rained and a decision was made to go straight to the final and bronze final. The 5th to 9th placement games were also removed.

=== Bronze medal game ===
8 April 10:00 (KST) Songdo LNG Stadium 10 °C (50 °F), fair
Team	1	2	3	4	5	6	7	R	H	E
Philippines	4	1	0	0	0	0	0	5	8	3
Chinese Taipei	3	0	3	1	2	1	X	10	11	0
WP: Hsia-Ai Ke LP: Kaith Jalandoni; Home runs: PHI: None; TPE: Chia-Hui Ko; Boxscore

=== Final ===
8 April 12:00 (KST) Songdo LNG Stadium 11 °C (52 °F), fair
Team	1	2	3	4	5	6	7	R	H	E
China	0	0	0	0	0	0	0	0	3	1
Japan	1	1	0	0	0	4	X	6	5	1
WP: Miu Goto LP: Yinan Chai; Home runs: CHN: None; JPN: Ayane Nakagawa; Boxscore

== Final standings ==
Qualified for: 2024 Women's Softball World Cup

Rank	Team
Gold medal	Japan
Silver medal	China
Bronze medal	Chinese Taipei
4th	Philippines
5th	South Korea
6th	Hong Kong
7th	Singapore
8th	Thailand
9th	India

Source: World Baseball Softball Confederation

== Qualified teams for 2024 Women's Softball World Cup ==
The following four teams from Asia qualify for the 2024 Women's Softball World Cup.

Team	Qualified on	Previous appearances in Women's Softball World Cup^{1}
Japan	6 April 2023	15 (1965, **1970**, 1974, 1986, 1990, 1994, 1998, 2002, 2006, 2010, **2012**, **2014**, 2016, 2018, 2022)
China	6 April 2023	11 (1986, 1990, 1994, 1998, 2002, 2006, 2010, 2012, 2014, 2016, 2018)
Chinese Taipei	6 April 2023	16 (1970, 1974, 1978, 1982, 1986, 1990, 1994, 1998, 2002, 2006, 2010, 2012, 2014, 2016, 2018, 2022)
Philippines	6 April 2023	7 (1970, 1974, 1982, 1990, 1998, 2016, 2018)

^{1} Bold indicates champions for that year. Italic indicates hosts for that year.

== Individual awards ==
- Most Valuable Player: Miu Goto (Japan)

=== Asia All Star Team ===
- First Base: Minori Naito (Japan)
- Second Base: Lin Feng-Chin (Chinese Taipei)
- Third Base: Yui Sakamoto (Japan)
- Short Stop: Kanna Kudo (Japan)
- Center Field: Chen Jia (China)
- Right Field: Alaiza Talisik (Philippines)
- Catcher: Lin Szu-Shih (Chinese Taipei)
- Left-hand pitcher: Miu Goto (Japan)
- Right-hand pitcher: Chai Yinan (China)
- Designated Position (DP): Risa Kawamura (Japan)
