= Lauren Gibson =

American softball player

Tennessee Lady Volunteers – No. 27
- Second baseman
- Born: Lauren Ashley Gibson; August 19, 1991 (age 34); Pasadena, Maryland, U.S.
- Bats: Left Throws: Right

Teams
- Tennessee Lady Volunteers (2010–2013); Team USA (2011–2015)
Medals
Women's softball
Representing United States
ISF Women's World Championship
Silver medal – second place	2012 Whitehorse	Team
Silver medal – second place	2014 Haarlem	Team
World Cup of Softball
Gold medal – first place	2011 Oklahoma City	Team
Gold medal – first place	2012 Oklahoma City	Team
Silver medal – second place	2013 Oklahoma City	Team
Gold medal – first place	2014 Irvine, CA	Team
Gold medal – first place	2015 Irvine, CA	Team
Pan American Games
Gold medal – first place	2011 Guadalajara	Team
Silver medal – second place	2015 Toronto	Team
Canada Cup
Silver medal – second place	2011 South Surrey	Team
Silver medal – second place	2012 South Surrey	Team
Bronze medal – third place	2013 South Surrey	Team
Silver medal – second place	2014 South Surrey	Team

Lauren Ashley Gibson (born August 19, 1991) is an American softball player.

== Personal life ==
Gibson's hometown is Pasadena, Maryland. Her parents are Steve and Lorrie Gibson, and she has an older sister named Danielle.

== Amateur softball career ==
She attended Chesapeake High School (Anne Arundel County) where she played softball, basketball, and soccer. Gibson led the Chesapeake softball team to 2 consecutive class 4A state championships, pitching no-hitters in both games. Currently, she attends the College of Agricultural Sciences and Natural Resources at University of Tennessee. Gibson was chosen as a NFCA first-team All-American in 2011, after winning the SEC batting title with a .420 average. In 2012 after leading the Lady Vols to the Women's College World Series, she was once again chosen as a NFCA first-team All-American at second base. Gibson was chosen as the Co-SEC Player of the Week for the week of March 11, 2013. She earned this honor after hitting .500 with three home runs against No. 3/3 Florida and Winthrop. She won the 2013 SEC Player of the Year award following the end of the season.

== Team USA ==
Gibson has been a member of Team USA since 2011. With the United States women's national softball team she won the 2011 World Cup of Softball. Gibson led team USA in 2012 with a .500 batting average. She also hit 5 home-runs and tallied 18 RBIs in 22 games in 2012.
