= United States women's national softball team =

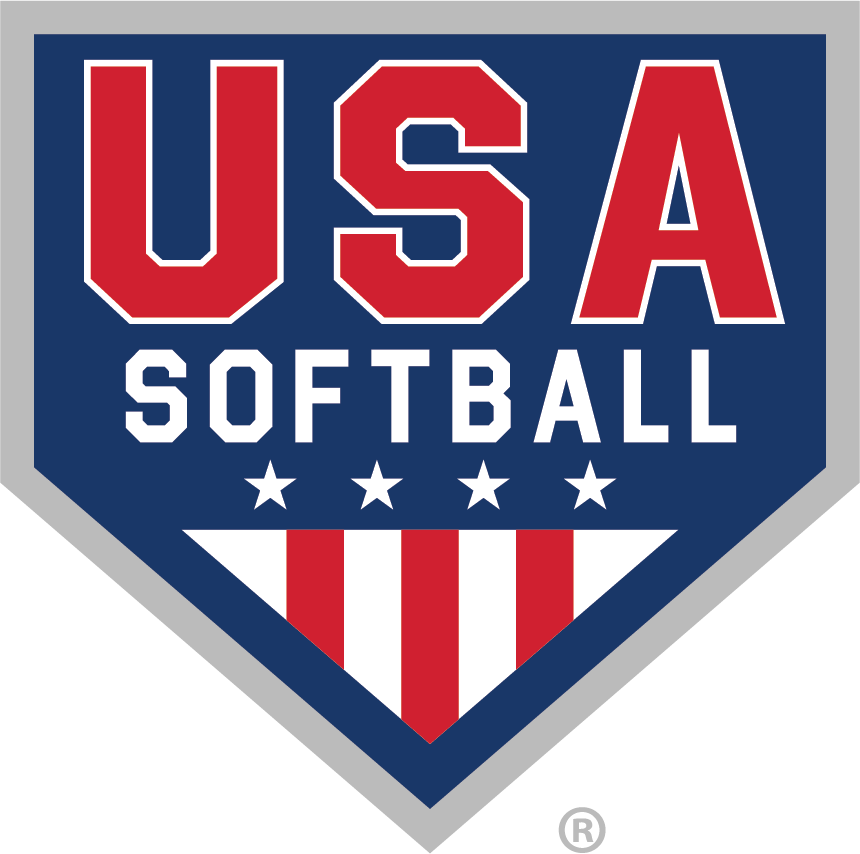

Information
- Country: United States
- Federation: USA Softball
- Confederation: WBSC Americas
- Manager: Patty Gasso
- WBSC World Rank: 2 (31 December 2025)

Olympic Games
- Appearances: 5 (First in 1996)
- Best result: Gold (1996, 2000, 2004)
Medal record
Olympic Games
Gold medal – first place	1996 Atlanta	Team
Gold medal – first place	2000 Sydney	Team
Gold medal – first place	2004 Athens	Team
Silver medal – second place	2008 Beijing	Team
Silver medal – second place	2020 Tokyo	Team
Women's World Cup
Gold medal – first place	1974 Stratford
Gold medal – first place	1978 San Salvador
Gold medal – first place	1986 Auckland
Gold medal – first place	1990 Normal
Gold medal – first place	1994 St. John's
Gold medal – first place	1998 Fujinomiya
Gold medal – first place	2002 Saskatoon
Gold medal – first place	2006 Beijing
Gold medal – first place	2010 Caracas
Gold medal – first place	2016 South Surrey
Gold medal – first place	2018 Chiba
Silver medal – second place	1965 Melbourne
Silver medal – second place	1970 Osaka
Silver medal – second place	2012 Whitehorse
Silver medal – second place	2014 Haarlem
Silver medal – second place	2024 Castions di Strada
World Games
Gold medal – first place	1981 Santa Clara
Gold medal – first place	1985 London
Gold medal – first place	2022 Birmingham
Gold medal – first place	2025 Chengdu
Pan American Games
Gold medal – first place	1979 San Juan	Team
Gold medal – first place	1987 Indianapolis	Team
Gold medal – first place	1991 Havana	Team
Gold medal – first place	1995 Mar del Plata	Team
Gold medal – first place	1999 Winnipeg	Team
Gold medal – first place	2003 Santo Domingo	Team
Gold medal – first place	2007 Rio de Janeiro	Team
Gold medal – first place	2011 Guadalajara	Team
Gold medal – first place	2019 Lima	Team
Gold medal – first place	2023 Santiago	Team
Silver medal – second place	1983 Caracas	Team
Silver medal – second place	2015 Toronto	Team
International Cup
Gold medal – first place	2006 Oklahoma City
Gold medal – first place	2007 Oklahoma City
Gold medal – first place	2009 Oklahoma City
Gold medal – first place	2010 Oklahoma City
Gold medal – first place	2011 Oklahoma City
Gold medal – first place	2012 Oklahoma City
Gold medal – first place	2014 Irvine, CA
Gold medal – first place	2015 Irvine, CA
Gold medal – first place	2018 Irvine, CA
Silver medal – second place	2005 Oklahoma City
Silver medal – second place	2013 Oklahoma City
Silver medal – second place	2016 Oklahoma City
Silver medal – second place	2017 Oklahoma City
Japan Cup
Gold medal – first place	2006 Yokohama
Gold medal – first place	2007 Yokohama
Gold medal – first place	2009 Sendai
Gold medal – first place	2010 Japan
Gold medal – first place	2015 Japan
Silver medal – second place	2016 Ogaki City
Silver medal – second place	2017 Takasaki City
Canada Cup
Gold medal – first place	1999 South Surrey
Gold medal – first place	2002 South Surrey
Gold medal – first place	2003 South Surrey
Gold medal – first place	2007 South Surrey
Gold medal – first place	2009 South Surrey
Gold medal – first place	2011 South Surrey
Gold medal – first place	2022 South Surrey
Silver medal – second place	2005 South Surrey
Silver medal – second place	2012 South Surrey
Silver medal – second place	2014 South Surrey
Bronze medal – third place	2013 South Surrey

The United States women's national softball team is the national softball team of the United States. It is governed by USA Softball (formerly known as the Amateur Softball Association) and takes part in international softball competitions. The US team has been successful in international play, taking three straight gold medals in Olympic Games and eleven titles in Women's World Cup. At the 2004 Olympics, the Americans held their opponents to only one run scored in 7 games. The lone run came in a 5–1 victory over the Australian team. However, the team then won the silver medals at the 2008 and 2020 Summer Olympics, both times narrowly losing to Japan.

On March 26, 2008, the United States Olympic softball team had their 185-game winning streak (both official and exhibition games) snapped in a no-hitter thrown by Virginia Tech's pitcher Angela Tincher, who struck out 10 batters in a 1–0 exhibition win for the Hokies. The no-hit win proved something extra special in this case, as Tincher had previously tried out and failed to make the 2008 US Olympic softball team.

In 2022, the World Games featured a softball tournament for the first time, giving the Americans a chance to avenge their Olympic loss in Japan. Eight members who won the silver medal a year earlier were on the team. The roster was composed of eleven former student athletes and seven current athletes from 12 NCAA Division 1 teams.

== Roster ==
=== 2025 World Games ===
Softball at the 2025 World Games - United States roster roster
Players		Coaches
Pitchers: 3 Ally Carda; 24 Megan Faraimo; 21 Rachel Garcia; 28 Kelly McCall Maxwell	Catchers: 34 Dejah Mulipola; 27 Sahvanna Jaquish; Infielders: 3 Ally Carda; 24 Megan Faraimo; 37 Hannah Flippen; 21 Rachel Garcia; 22 Janae Jefferson; 23 Tiare Jennings; 1 Skylar Wallace; 30 Jessie Warren; Outfielders: 10 Jayda Coleman; 18 Amanda Lorenz; 48 Bubba Nickles; 7 Maya Brady	Manager: -- Patty Gasso; Coaches: -- Jamison-Thomas Arvizu Gasso; -- Kelly Kretschman; -- Jennifer Rocha

=== 2020 Summer Olympics ===
The United States roster was released on June 20, 2021.

Softball at the 2020 Summer Olympics – United States roster
Players		Coaches
Pitchers: 14 Monica Abbott; 21 Rachel Garcia; 38 Cat Osterman	Catchers: 1 Aubree Munro; 4 Amanda Chidester; 34 Dejah Mulipola; Infielders: 2 Ali Aguilar; 3 Ally Carda; 7 Kelsey Stewart; 20 Valerie Arioto; 99 Delaney Spaulding; Outfielders: 8 Haylie McCleney; 9 Janie Reed; 16 Michelle Moultrie; 48 Bubba Nickles	Manager: 0 Ken Eriksen; Coaches: Laura Berg

== Competitive record ==
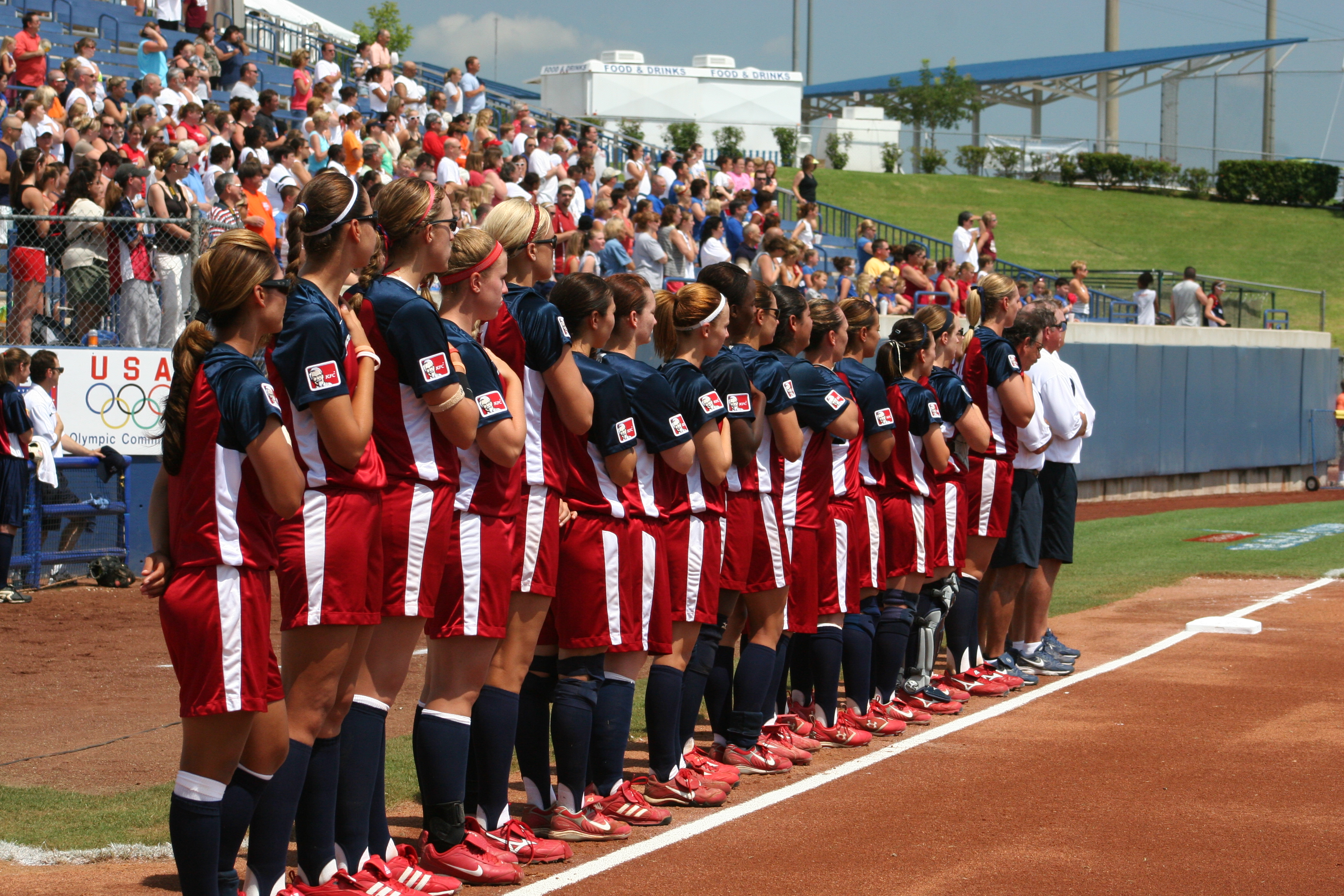
National Anthem plays before a game at the 2007 World Cup of Softball in Oklahoma City on August 22

=== Olympic Games ===
Year	Result	Position	Pld	W	L	%	RS	RA
(United States) 1996	Gold medal	1st	9	8	1	.889	41	8
(Australia) 2000	Gold medal	1st	10	7	3	.700	25	7
(Greece) 2004	Gold medal	1st	9	9	0	1.000	51	1
(China) 2008	Silver medal	2nd	9	8	1	.889	58	5
(Japan) 2020	Silver medal	2nd	6	5	1	.833	9	4
Total	3 titles	5/5	43	37	6	.862	184	25

=== Women's World Cup ===
Year	Result	Position	Pld	W	L	%	RS	RA
(Australia) 1965	Runners-up	2nd						
(Japan) 1970	Runners-up	2nd						
(United States) 1974	Champions	1st						
(El Salvador) 1978	Champions	1st						
(Taiwan) 1982	Fourth Place	4th						
(New Zealand) 1986	Champions	1st						
(United States) 1990	Champions	1st	11	11	0	1.000		
(Canada) 1994	Champions	1st	10	10	0	1.000	70	4
(Japan) 1998	Champions	1st	12	11	1	.917		
(Canada) 2002	Champions	1st	10	10	0	1.000	59	3
(China) 2006	Champions	1st	11	10	1	.909	71	6
(Venezuela) 2010	Champions	1st	10	10	0	1.000	95	6
(Canada) 2012	Runners-up	2nd	10	9	1	.900		
(Netherlands) 2014	Runners-up	2nd	11	9	2	.818	70	15
(Canada) 2016	Champions	1st	8	8	0	1.000	76	10
(Japan) 2018	Champions	1st	10	10	0	1.000	71	13
(United States) 2022	See Softball at the 2022 World Games							
(Italy) 2024	Runners-up	2nd	10	9	1	.900	56	8
(Australia) 2027	Qualified							
Total	11 titles	17/18	—					

=== World Games ===
Year	Result	Position	Pld	W	L	%	RS	RA
(United States) 1981	Gold medal	1st	7	7	0	1.000	21	0
(United Kingdom) 1985	Gold medal	1st						
(Taiwan) 2009	Did not participate							
(Colombia) 2013	Did not participate							
(United States) 2022	Gold medal	1st	5	5	0	1.000	31	4
(China) 2025	Gold medal	1st	5	5	0	1.000	32	8
Total	4 titles	4/6	—					

=== Pan American Games ===
Year	Result	Position	Pld	W	L	%	RS	RA
(Puerto Rico) 1979	Gold medal	1st						
(Venezuela) 1983	Silver medal	2nd						
(United States) 1987	Gold medal	1st						
(Cuba) 1991	Gold medal	1st						
(Argentina) 1995	Gold medal	1st						
(Canada) 1999	Gold medal	1st						
(Dominican Republic) 2003	Gold medal	1st						
(Brazil) 2007	Gold medal	1st	4	4	0	1.000	28	0
(Mexico) 2011	Gold medal	1st	9	9	0	1.000	78	8
(Canada) 2015	Silver medal	2nd	7	6	1	.857	50	10
(Peru) 2019	Gold medal	1st	8	7	1	.875	45	6
(Chile) 2023	Gold medal	1st	6	6	0	1.000	60	8
Total	10 titles	12/12	—					

== Results summary ==
- Olympics: Gold Medal – 1996, 2000, 2004; Silver Medal – 2008, 2020
- Women's Softball World Cup: Gold Medal – 1974, 1978, 1986, 1990, 1994, 1998, 2002, 2006, 2010, 2016, 2018; Silver Medal – 1965, 1970, 2012. 2014
- Softball at the World Games: Gold Medal – 1981, 1985, 2022
- Softball at the Pan American Games: Gold Medal – 1979, 1987, 1991, 1995, 1999, 2003, 2007, 2011, 2019, 2023; Silver Medal – 1983, 2015
- USA Softball International Cup: 1st – 2006, 2007, 2009, 2010, 2011, 2012, 2014, 2015, 2018, 2019; 2nd – 2005, 2013, 2016
- Japan Softball Cup: 1st – 2006, 2007, 2009, 2010, 2015; 2nd – 2016
- Canada Cup: Gold Medal – 1999, 2002, 2003, 2007, 2009, 2022; Silver Medal – 2005, 2011, 2012, 2014; Bronze Medal – 2013

== All-time results ==
Results for the following international competitions could not be located:

- 1981 World Games
- 1985 World Games
- 1999 Canada Cup
- 2002 Canada Cup
- 2003 Canada Cup
- 2005 Canada Cup
- 2011 Canada Cup

International friendlies were not included. The 2008 KFC Bound for Beijing Tour against colleges and NPF teams in the United States were not included as they were not against international opponents.

=== Summary ===
Year	W	L	Pct
1965	8	3	.727
1970	8	2	.800
1974	9	0	1.000
1978	10	0	1.000
1979	13	1	.929
1982	7	3	.700
1983	10	2	.833
1986	13	0	1.000
1987	9	0	1.000
1990	10	0	1.000

Year	W	L	Pct
1991	9	0	1.000
1994	10	0	1.000
1995	12	0	1.000
1996	8	1	.889
1998	11	1	.917
1999	12	0	1.000
2000	7	3	.700
2001	7	3	.700
2002	10	0	1.000
2003	9	0	1.000

Year	W	L	Pct
2004	9	0	1.000
2005	3	2	.600
2006	20	1	.952
2007	24	1	.960
2008	10	1	.909
2009	22	0	1.000
2010	19	2	.905
2011	14	1	.933
2012	16	1	.941
2013	18	4	.818
2014	25	5	.833
2015	16	3	.842
2016	18	2	.900
2017	22	3	.880
2018	20	0	1.000
2019	21	2	.913
2020	No games played (COVID-19)		
2021			
Totals	464	46	.910

=== 1965 ===
Date	Event	Location	Winner	Score	Loser	Yearly Record
February 13, 1965	World Championship	Melbourne, Australia	Australia	2–1	United States	0–1
February 14, 1965	World Championship	Melbourne, Australia	United States	1–0	New Zealand	1–1
February 14, 1965	World Championship	Melbourne, Australia	United States	2–0	Japan	2–1
February 15, 1965	World Championship	Melbourne, Australia	United States	7–0	Papua New Guinea	3–1
February 16, 1965	World Championship	Melbourne, Australia	United States	8–0	Papua New Guinea	4–1
February 17, 1965	World Championship	Melbourne, Australia	United States	1–0 (10)	Australia	5–1
February 18, 1965	World Championship	Melbourne, Australia	United States	3–1	New Zealand	6–1
February 18, 1965	World Championship	Melbourne, Australia	United States	7–1	Japan	7–1
February 19, 1965	World Championship	Melbourne, Australia	Australia	7–0	United States	7–2
February 20, 1965	World Championship	Melbourne, Australia	United States	6–0	Japan	8–2
February 21, 1965	World Championship	Melbourne, Australia	Australia	1–0	United States	8–3

=== 1970 ===
Date	Event	Location	Winner	Score	Loser	Yearly Record
August 23, 1970	World Championship	Osaka, Japan	United States	13–2 (6)	Zambia	1–0
August 24, 1970	World Championship	Osaka, Japan	United States	4–0	New Zealand	2–0
August 25, 1970	World Championship	Osaka, Japan	Philippines	1–0	United States	2–1
August 26, 1970	World Championship	Osaka, Japan	United States	10–0 (5)	Mexico	3–1
August 27, 1970	World Championship	Osaka, Japan	United States	1–0	Australia	4–1
August 28, 1970	World Championship	Osaka, Japan	United States	2–1	Canada	5–1
August 29, 1970	World Championship	Osaka, Japan	United States	5–0	Chinese Taipei	6–1
August 29, 1970	World Championship	Osaka, Japan	United States	1–0	Japan	7–1
August 30, 1970	World Championship	Osaka, Japan	United States	1–0 (10)	Philippines	8–1
August 30, 1970	World Championship	Osaka, Japan	Japan	1–0	United States	8–2

=== 1974 ===
Date	Event	Location	Winner	Score	Loser	Yearly Record
August 8, 1974	World Championship	Stratford, Connecticut	United States	10–0 (6)	New Zealand	1–0
August 10, 1974	World Championship	Stratford, Connecticut	United States	5–0	Canada	2–0
August 10, 1974	World Championship	Stratford, Connecticut	United States	1–0	Philippines	3–0
August 11, 1974	World Championship	Stratford, Connecticut	United States	13–0 (5)	U.S. Virgin Islands	4–0
August 12, 1974	World Championship	Stratford, Connecticut	United States	11–0 (5)	Puerto Rico	5–0
August 13, 1974	World Championship	Stratford, Connecticut	United States	17–0 (5)	Italy	6–0
August 14, 1974	World Championship	Stratford, Connecticut	United States	9–0	Australia	7–0
August 15, 1974	World Championship	Stratford, Connecticut	United States	6–0	Australia	8–0
August 16, 1974	World Championship	Stratford, Connecticut	United States	3–0	Japan	9–0

=== 1978 ===
Date	Event	Location	Winner	Score	Loser	Yearly Record
October 14, 1978	World Championship	San Salvador, El Salvador	United States	8–0	Chinese Taipei	1–0
October 15, 1978	World Championship	San Salvador, El Salvador	United States	16–0 (5)	Nicaragua	2–0
October 15, 1978	World Championship	San Salvador, El Salvador	United States	14–0 (5)	Panama	3–0
October 16, 1978	World Championship	San Salvador, El Salvador	United States	6–1	Belize	4–0
October 17, 1978	World Championship	San Salvador, El Salvador	United States	1–0	New Zealand	5–0
October 18, 1978	World Championship	San Salvador, El Salvador	United States	3–2	Italy	6–0
October 19, 1978	World Championship	San Salvador, El Salvador	United States	4–0	Bahamas	7–0
October 20, 1978	World Championship	San Salvador, El Salvador	United States	3–0	Australia	8–0
October 21, 1978	World Championship	San Salvador, El Salvador	United States	1–0	Chinese Taipei	9–0
October 22, 1978	World Championship	San Salvador, El Salvador	United States	4–0	Canada	10–0

=== 1979 ===
Date	Event	Location	Winner	Score	Loser	Yearly Record
July 2, 1979	Pan American Games	San Juan, Puerto Rico	United States	1–0 (15)	Canada	1–0
July 3, 1979	Pan American Games	San Juan, Puerto Rico	United States	10–0	El Salvador	2–0
July 4, 1979	Pan American Games	San Juan, Puerto Rico	United States	5–0	Dominican Republic	3–0
July 6, 1979	Pan American Games	San Juan, Puerto Rico	Belize	2–1	United States	3–1
July 6, 1979	Pan American Games	San Juan, Puerto Rico	United States	12–0	Dominican Republic	4–1
July 7, 1979	Pan American Games	San Juan, Puerto Rico	United States	1–0	Puerto Rico	5–1
July 8, 1979	Pan American Games	San Juan, Puerto Rico	United States	10–0	Bermuda	6–1
July 9, 1979	Pan American Games	San Juan, Puerto Rico	United States	2–0	Belize	7–1
July 10, 1979	Pan American Games	San Juan, Puerto Rico	United States	9–0	Bermuda	8–1
July 10, 1979	Pan American Games	San Juan, Puerto Rico	United States	9–0	El Salvador	9–1
July 11, 1979	Pan American Games	San Juan, Puerto Rico	United States	5–0	Canada	10–1
July 13, 1979	Pan American Games	San Juan, Puerto Rico	United States	1–0	Puerto Rico	11–1
July 14, 1979	Pan American Games	San Juan, Puerto Rico	United States	6–0	Belize	12–1
July 15, 1979	Pan American Games	San Juan, Puerto Rico	United States	2–0	Puerto Rico	13–1

=== 1982 ===
Date	Event	Location	Winner	Score	Loser	Yearly Record
July 3, 1982	World Championship	Taipei, Taiwan	United States	4–0	Australia	1–0
July 5, 1982	World Championship	Taipei, Taiwan	United States	4–0	Singapore	2–0
July 5, 1982	World Championship	Taipei, Taiwan	United States	10–0	Colombia	3–0
July 8, 1982	World Championship	Taipei, Taiwan	United States	10–0	Guatemala	4–0
July 8, 1982	World Championship	Taipei, Taiwan	United States	8–0	Belgium	5–0
July 9, 1982	World Championship	Taipei, Taiwan	United States	9–0	Sweden	6–0
July 10, 1982	World Championship	Taipei, Taiwan	Chinese Taipei	2–1	United States	6–1
July 11, 1982	World Championship	Taipei, Taiwan	United States	4–0	Philippines	7–1
July 11, 1982	World Championship	Taipei, Taiwan	Chinese Taipei	1–0	United States	7–2
July 11, 1982	World Championship	Taipei, Taiwan	Australia	1–0	United States	7–3

=== 1983 ===
Date	Event	Location	Winner	Score	Loser	Yearly Record
August 15, 1983	Pan American Games	Caracas, Venezuela	Puerto Rico	6–5	United States	0–1
August 16, 1983	Pan American Games	Caracas, Venezuela	United States	16–0 (5)	Venezuela	1–1
August 16, 1983	Pan American Games	Caracas, Venezuela	United States	14–0	Netherlands Antilles	2–1
August 17, 1983	Pan American Games	Caracas, Venezuela	United States	7–4	Belize	3–1
August 18, 1983	Pan American Games	Caracas, Venezuela	United States	6–0	Canada	4–1
August 19, 1983	Pan American Games	Caracas, Venezuela	United States	1–0	Puerto Rico	5–1
August 20, 1983	Pan American Games	Caracas, Venezuela	United States	17–0	Netherlands Antilles	6–1
August 20, 1983	Pan American Games	Caracas, Venezuela	United States	8–1	Venezuela	7–1
August 21, 1983	Pan American Games	Caracas, Venezuela	United States	16–6	Belize	8–1
August 22, 1983	Pan American Games	Caracas, Venezuela	United States	3–0	Canada	9–1
August 23, 1983	Pan American Games	Caracas, Venezuela	United States	7–1	Canada	10–1
August 24, 1983	Pan American Games	Caracas, Venezuela	Canada	5–4	United States	10–2

=== 1986 ===
Date	Event	Location	Winner	Score	Loser	Yearly Record
January 18, 1986	World Championship	Auckland, New Zealand	United States	2–0	Puerto Rico	1–0
January 19, 1986	World Championship	Auckland, New Zealand	United States	3–0 (10)	Italy	2–0
January 19, 1986	World Championship	Auckland, New Zealand	United States	7–0	Indonesia	3–0
January 20, 1986	World Championship	Auckland, New Zealand	United States	3–0	Netherlands	4–0
January 21, 1986	World Championship	Auckland, New Zealand	United States	1–0	Chinese Taipei	5–0
January 22, 1986	World Championship	Auckland, New Zealand	United States	2–1	Canada	6–0
January 22, 1986	World Championship	Auckland, New Zealand	United States	1–0	China	7–0
January 23, 1986	World Championship	Auckland, New Zealand	United States	2–1 (8)	Australia	8–0
January 24, 1986	World Championship	Auckland, New Zealand	United States	3–2 (12)	New Zealand	9–0
January 25, 1986	World Championship	Auckland, New Zealand	United States	10–0 (5)	Zimbabwe	10–0
January 25, 1986	World Championship	Auckland, New Zealand	United States	4–0	Japan	11–0
January 26, 1986	World Championship	Auckland, New Zealand	United States	1–0	New Zealand	12–0
January 26, 1986	World Championship	Auckland, New Zealand	United States	2–0	China	13–0

=== 1987 ===
Date	Event	Location	Winner	Score	Loser	Yearly Record
August 9, 1987	Pan American Games	Indianapolis, Indiana	United States	10–0 (6)	El Salvador	1–0
August 10, 1987	Pan American Games	Indianapolis, Indiana	United States	15–0 (5)	Peru	2–0
August 12, 1987	Pan American Games	Indianapolis, Indiana	United States	6–0	Venezuela	3–0
August 13, 1987	Pan American Games	Indianapolis, Indiana	United States	6–0	Belize	4–0
August 15, 1987	Pan American Games	Indianapolis, Indiana	United States	1–0	Netherlands Antilles	5–0
August 16, 1987	Pan American Games	Indianapolis, Indiana	United States	4–0	Puerto Rico	6–0
August 17, 1987	Pan American Games	Indianapolis, Indiana	United States	1–0	Canada	7–0
August 18, 1987	Pan American Games	Indianapolis, Indiana	United States	4–0	Puerto Rico	8–0
August 20, 1987	Pan American Games	Indianapolis, Indiana	United States	4–1	Puerto Rico	9–0

=== 1990 ===
Date	Event	Location	Winner	Score	Loser	Yearly Record
July 14, 1990	World Championship	Normal, Illinois	United States	7–0	Philippines	1–0
July 15, 1990	World Championship	Normal, Illinois	United States	19–0 (5)	Bermuda	2–0
July 15, 1990	World Championship	Normal, Illinois	United States	8–0	Puerto Rico	3–0
July 16, 1990	World Championship	Normal, Illinois	United States	10–0 (5)	Mexico	4–0
July 17, 1990	World Championship	Normal, Illinois	United States	2–1	Australia	5–0
July 18, 1990	World Championship	Normal, Illinois	United States	10–0 (5)	Netherlands Antilles	6–0
July 19, 1990	World Championship	Normal, Illinois	United States	2–0	Japan	7–0
July 19, 1990	World Championship	Normal, Illinois	United States	14–0 (5)	Zimbabwe	8–0
July 20, 1990	World Championship	Normal, Illinois	United States	1–0	Canada	9–0
July 21, 1990	World Championship	Normal, Illinois	United States	6–1	New Zealand	10–0

=== 1991 ===
Date	Event	Location	Winner	Score	Loser	Yearly Record
Aug 1991	Pan American Games	Havana, Cuba	United States	4–0	Netherlands Antilles	1–0
Aug 1991	Pan American Games	Havana, Cuba	United States	1–0	Canada	2–0
Aug 1991	Pan American Games	Havana, Cuba	United States	10–0	Puerto Rico	3–0
Aug 1991	Pan American Games	Havana, Cuba	United States	8–0	Nicaragua	4–0
Aug 1991	Pan American Games	Havana, Cuba	United States	7–0	Bahamas	5–0
Aug 1991	Pan American Games	Havana, Cuba	United States	6–0	Venezuela	6–0
Aug 1991	Pan American Games	Havana, Cuba	United States	6–0	Cuba	7–0
Aug 1991	Pan American Games	Havana, Cuba	United States	4–2	Canada	8–0
Aug 1991	Pan American Games	Havana, Cuba	United States	14–1	Canada	9–0

=== 1994 ===
Date	Event	Location	Winner	Score	Loser	Yearly Record
July 29, 1994	World Championship	St. John's, Newfoundland	United States	10–0 (5)	South Korea	1–0
July 30, 1994	World Championship	St. John's, Newfoundland	United States	18–0	Spain	2–0
July 30, 1994	World Championship	St. John's, Newfoundland	United States	7–0 (5)	Moldova	3–0
August 1, 1994	World Championship	St. John's, Newfoundland	United States	14–0 (5)	Great Britain	4–0
August 2, 1994	World Championship	St. John's, Newfoundland	United States	5–3	Chinese Taipei	5–0
August 4, 1994	World Championship	St. John's, Newfoundland	United States	5–0	Cuba	6–0
August 6, 1994	World Championship	St. John's, Newfoundland	United States	1–0 (10)	Australia	7–0
August 6, 1994	World Championship	St. John's, Newfoundland	United States	2–0	Australia	8–0
August 6, 1994	World Championship	St. John's, Newfoundland	United States	2–1 (12)	China	9–0
August 7, 1994	World Championship	St. John's, Newfoundland	United States	6–0	China	10–0

=== 1995 ===
Date	Event	Location	Winner	Score	Loser	Yearly Record
March 14, 1995	Pan American Games	Mar del Plata, Argentina	United States	6–0	Puerto Rico	1–0
March 15, 1995	Pan American Games	Mar del Plata, Argentina	United States	11–0 (5)	Netherlands Antilles	2–0
March 16, 1995	Pan American Games	Mar del Plata, Argentina	United States	6–1	Canada	3–0
March 17, 1995	Pan American Games	Mar del Plata, Argentina	United States	1–0 (10)	Cuba	4–0
March 18, 1995	Pan American Games	Mar del Plata, Argentina	United States	11–0	Argentina	5–0
March 19, 1995	Pan American Games	Mar del Plata, Argentina	United States	14–0	Puerto Rico	6–0
March 19, 1995	Pan American Games	Mar del Plata, Argentina	United States	10–0	Netherlands Antilles	7–0
March 20, 1995	Pan American Games	Mar del Plata, Argentina	United States	2–0	Canada	8–0
March 21, 1995	Pan American Games	Mar del Plata, Argentina	United States	2–0	Cuba	9–0
March 22, 1995	Pan American Games	Mar del Plata, Argentina	United States	11–0 (5)	Argentina	10–0
March 24, 1995	Pan American Games	Mar del Plata, Argentina	United States	5–0	Cuba	11–0
March 25, 1995	Pan American Games	Mar del Plata, Argentina	United States	7–0	Puerto Rico	12–0

=== 1996 ===
Date	Event	Location	Winner	Score	Loser	Yearly Record
July 21, 1996	Summer Olympics	Columbus, Georgia	United States	10–0 (6)	Puerto Rico	1–0
July 22, 1996	Summer Olympics	Columbus, Georgia	United States	9–0	Netherlands	2–0
July 23, 1996	Summer Olympics	Columbus, Georgia	United States	6–1	Japan	3–0
July 24, 1996	Summer Olympics	Columbus, Georgia	United States	4–0	Chinese Taipei	4–0
July 25, 1996	Summer Olympics	Columbus, Georgia	United States	4–2	Canada	5–0
July 26, 1996	Summer Olympics	Columbus, Georgia	Australia	2–1	United States	5–1
July 27, 1996	Summer Olympics	Columbus, Georgia	United States	3–2	China	6–1
July 29, 1996	Summer Olympics	Columbus, Georgia	United States	1–0 (10)	China	7–1
July 30, 1996	Summer Olympics	Columbus, Georgia	United States	3–1	China	8–1

=== 1998 ===
Date	Event	Location	Winner	Score	Loser	Yearly Record
July 21, 1998	World Championship	Fujinomiya, Japan	United States	5–0	Netherlands	1–0
July 22, 1998	World Championship	Fujinomiya, Japan	United States	3–0	Italy	2–0
July 23, 1998	World Championship	Fujinomiya, Japan	United States	11–0 (6)	Colombia	3–0
July 25, 1998	World Championship	Fujinomiya, Japan	United States	12–0 (5)	South Africa	4–0
July 25, 1998	World Championship	Fujinomiya, Japan	United States	14–0 (5)	Denmark	5–0
July 26, 1998	World Championship	Fujinomiya, Japan	United States	9–0	Chinese Taipei	6–0
July 26, 1998	World Championship	Fujinomiya, Japan	United States	3–0	Canada	7–0
July 27, 1998	World Championship	Fujinomiya, Japan	United States	10–0 (5)	Czech Republic	
July 28, 1998	World Championship	Fujinomiya, Japan	United States	1–0 (9)	Japan	9–0
July 29, 1998	World Championship	Fujinomiya, Japan	Australia	2–1 (12)	United States	9–1
July 30, 1998	World Championship	Fujinomiya, Japan	United States	4–0	Japan	10–1
July 30, 1998	World Championship	Fujinomiya, Japan	United States	1–0	Australia	11–1

=== 1999 ===
Date	Event	Location	Winner	Score	Loser	Yearly Record
July 29, 1999	Pan American Games	Winnipeg, Manitoba	United States	9–0	Colombia	1–0
July 30, 1999	Pan American Games	Winnipeg, Manitoba	United States	5–0	Netherlands Antilles	2–0
July 31, 1999	Pan American Games	Winnipeg, Manitoba	United States	7–0	Netherlands Antilles	3–0
July 31, 1999	Pan American Games	Winnipeg, Manitoba	United States	5–0	Cuba	4–0
August 1, 1999	Pan American Games	Winnipeg, Manitoba	United States	15–0 (5)	Bahamas	5–0
August 1, 1999	Pan American Games	Winnipeg, Manitoba	United States	7–0	Canada	6–0
August 2, 1999	Pan American Games	Winnipeg, Manitoba	United States	8–1	Colombia	7–0
August 3, 1999	Pan American Games	Winnipeg, Manitoba	United States	12–0 (5)	Bahamas	8–0
August 3, 1999	Pan American Games	Winnipeg, Manitoba	United States	3–0	Canada	9–0
August 4, 1999	Pan American Games	Winnipeg, Manitoba	United States	6–0	Cuba	10–0
August 6, 1999	Pan American Games	Winnipeg, Manitoba	United States	5–0	Canada	11–0
August 7, 1999	Pan American Games	Winnipeg, Manitoba	United States	1–0 (8)	Canada	12–0

=== 2000 ===
Date	Event	Location	Winner	Score	Loser	Yearly Record
September 17, 2000	Summer Olympics	Sydney, Australia	United States	6–0	Canada	1–0
September 18, 2000	Summer Olympics	Sydney, Australia	United States	3–0	Cuba	2–0
September 19, 2000	Summer Olympics	Sydney, Australia	Japan	2–1 (11)	United States	2–1
September 20, 2000	Summer Olympics	Sydney, Australia	China	2–0 (13)	United States	2–2
September 21, 2000	Summer Olympics	Sydney, Australia	Australia	2–1 (13)	United States	2–3
September 22, 2000	Summer Olympics	Sydney, Australia	United States	2–0	New Zealand	3–3
September 23, 2000	Summer Olympics	Sydney, Australia	United States	6–0	Italy	4–3
September 24, 2000	Summer Olympics	Sydney, Australia	United States	3–0 (10)	China	5–3
September 25, 2000	Summer Olympics	Sydney, Australia	United States	1–0	Australia	6–3
September 26, 2000	Summer Olympics	Sydney, Australia	United States	2–1 (8)	Japan	7–3

=== 2002 ===
Date	Event	Location	Winner	Score	Loser	Yearly Record
July 26, 2002	World Championship	Saskatoon, S.K.	United States	2–0	Italy	1–0
July 27, 2002	World Championship	Saskatoon, S.K.	United States	13–0	Czech Republic	2–0
July 28, 2002	World Championship	Saskatoon, S.K.	United States	4–0	Canada	3–0
July 29, 2002	World Championship	Saskatoon, S.K.	United States	14–0 (5)	Russia	4–0
July 30, 2002	World Championship	Saskatoon, S.K.	United States	9–0 (5)	Chinese Taipei	5–0
July 31, 2002	World Championship	Saskatoon, S.K.	United States	4–0	China	6–0
August 1, 2002	World Championship	Saskatoon, S.K.	United States	7–0 (5)	Netherlands Antilles	7–0
August 2, 2002	World Championship	Saskatoon, S.K.	United States	4–3	Australia	8–0
August 3, 2002	World Championship	Saskatoon, S.K.	United States	1–0 (9)	Japan	9–0
August 4, 2002	World Championship	Saskatoon, S.K.	United States	1–0	Japan	10–0

=== 2003 ===
Date	Event	Location	Winner	Score	Loser	Yearly Record
August 5, 2003	Pan American Games	Santo Domingo, DR	United States	9–0 (5)	Cuba	1–0
August 6, 2003	Pan American Games	Santo Domingo, DR	United States	1–0	Canada	2–0
August 7, 2003	Pan American Games	Santo Domingo, DR	United States	10–0 (5)	Bahamas	3–0
August 8, 2003	Pan American Games	Santo Domingo, DR	United States	11–0 (5)	Puerto Rico	4–0
August 9, 2003	Pan American Games	Santo Domingo, DR	United States	2–0	Venezuela	5–0
August 10, 2003	Pan American Games	Santo Domingo, DR	United States	13–0 (5)	Dominican Republic	6–0
August 11, 2003	Pan American Games	Santo Domingo, DR	United States	7–0 (5)	Colombia	7–0
August 13, 2003	Pan American Games	Santo Domingo, DR	United States	2–1	Dominican Republic	8–0
August 14, 2003	Pan American Games	Santo Domingo, DR	United States	4–0	Canada	9–0

=== 2004 ===
Date	Event	Location	Winner	Score	Loser	Yearly Record
August 14, 2004	Summer Olympics	Athens, Greece	United States	7–0 (5)	Italy	1–0
August 15, 2004	Summer Olympics	Athens, Greece	United States	10–0 (5)	Australia	2–0
August 16, 2004	Summer Olympics	Athens, Greece	United States	3–0 (8)	Japan	3–0
August 17, 2004	Summer Olympics	Athens, Greece	United States	4–0	China	4–0
August 18, 2004	Summer Olympics	Athens, Greece	United States	7–0 (5)	Canada	5–0
August 19, 2004	Summer Olympics	Athens, Greece	United States	7–0 (5)	Greece	6–0
August 20, 2004	Summer Olympics	Athens, Greece	United States	3–0	Chinese Taipei	7–0
August 22, 2004	Summer Olympics	Athens, Greece	United States	5–0	Australia	8–0
August 23, 2004	Summer Olympics	Athens, Greece	United States	5–1	Australia	9–0

=== 2005 ===
Date	Event	Location	Winner	Score	Loser	Yearly Record
July 14, 2005	World Cup of Softball	Oklahoma City, OK	Canada	2–1	United States	0–1
July 15, 2005	World Cup of Softball	Oklahoma City, OK	United States	3–1	Australia	1–1
July 16, 2005	World Cup of Softball	Oklahoma City, OK	United States	11–3 (5)	China	2–1
July 16, 2005	World Cup of Softball	Oklahoma City, OK	United States	7–0 (5)	Japan	3–1
July 18, 2005	World Cup of Softball	Oklahoma City, OK	Japan	3–1	United States	3–2

=== 2006 ===
Date	Event	Location	Winner	Score	Loser	Yearly Record
July 13, 2006	World Cup of Softball	Oklahoma City, OK	United States	14–0 (5)	Great Britain	1–0
July 14, 2006	World Cup of Softball	Oklahoma City, OK	United States	6–1	Canada	2–0
July 15, 2006	World Cup of Softball	Oklahoma City, OK	United States	9–0 (5)	Australia	3–0
July 15, 2006	World Cup of Softball	Oklahoma City, OK	United States	14–0 (5)	China	4–0
July 16, 2006	World Cup of Softball	Oklahoma City, OK	United States	11–0 (5)	Japan	5–0
July 17, 2006	World Cup of Softball	Oklahoma City, OK	United States	5–2	Japan	6–0
August 27, 2006	World Championship	Beijing, China	United States	6–1	Italy	7–0
August 28, 2006	World Championship	Beijing, China	United States	7–0 (5)	North Korea	8–0
August 29, 2006	World Championship	Beijing, China	United States	4–0	Canada	9–0
August 30, 2006	World Championship	Beijing, China	United States	7–0 (5)	Great Britain	10–0
September 1, 2006	World Championship	Beijing, China	United States	15–0 (4)	New Zealand	11–0
September 2, 2006	World Championship	Beijing, China	United States	2–0	China	12–0
September 3, 2006	World Championship	Beijing, China	United States	10–0 (5)	South Africa	13–0
September 4, 2006	World Championship	Beijing, China	United States	11–2 (6)	Australia	14–0
September 4, 2006	World Championship	Beijing, China	Japan	3–1	United States	14–1
September 5, 2006	World Championship	Beijing, China	United States	5–1	Australia	15–1
September 5, 2006	World Championship	Beijing, China	United States	3–0	Japan	16–1
November 17, 2006	Japan Softball Cup	Yokohama, Japan	United States	8–0	China	17–1
November 18, 2006	Japan Softball Cup	Yokohama, Japan	United States	2–0	Netherlands	18–1
November 18, 2006	Japan Softball Cup	Yokohama, Japan	United States	8–4	Japan	19–1
November 19, 2006	Japan Softball Cup	Yokohama, Japan	United States	7–0	Japan	20–1

=== 2007 ===
Date	Event	Location	Winner	Score	Loser	Yearly Record
June 30, 2007	Canada Cup	Surrey, Canada	United States	1–0	Japan Elite	1–0
July 1, 2007	Canada Cup	Surrey, Canada	United States	10–0 (3)	Puerto Rico	2–0
July 2, 2007	Canada Cup	Surrey, Canada	United States	11–0 (4)	Australia	3–0
July 3, 2007	Canada Cup	Surrey, Canada	United States	10–0 (3)	Washington Blast	4–0
July 4, 2007	Canada Cup	Surrey, Canada	United States	10–1 (5)	Chinese Taipei	5–0
July 5, 2007	Canada Cup	Surrey, Canada	United States	17–0 (3)	White Rock Renegades	6–0
July 6, 2007	Canada Cup	Surrey, Canada	United States	13–1 (6)	Venezuela	7–0
July 6, 2007	Canada Cup	Surrey, Canada	United States	7–0 (5)	Japan	8–0
July 7, 2007	Canada Cup	Surrey, Canada	United States	12–0 (3)	Japan Elite	9–0
July 8, 2007	Canada Cup	Surrey, Canada	United States	5–0	Japan	10–0
July 12, 2007	World Cup of Softball	Oklahoma City, OK	United States	9–1	Venezuela	11–0
July 13, 2007	World Cup of Softball	Oklahoma City, OK	United States	8–0 (5)	China	12–0
July 14, 2007	World Cup of Softball	Oklahoma City, OK	United States	9–0 (5)	Dominican Republic	13–0
July 14, 2007	World Cup of Softball	Oklahoma City, OK	United States	4–1	Japan	14–0
July 15, 2007	World Cup of Softball	Oklahoma City, OK	United States	7–0	Canada	15–0
July 15, 2007	World Cup of Softball	Oklahoma City, OK	United States	4–1	Venezuela	16–0
July 16, 2007	World Cup of Softball	Oklahoma City, OK	United States	3–0	Japan	17–0
July 25, 2007	Pan American Games	Rio de Janeiro, Brazil	United States	7–0 (5)	Brazil	18–0
July 26, 2007	Pan American Games	Rio de Janeiro, Brazil	United States	4–0	Colombia	19–0
July 27, 2007	Pan American Games	Rio de Janeiro, Brazil	United States	10–0 (5)	Cuba	20–0
July 28, 2007	Pan American Games	Rio de Janeiro, Brazil	United States	7–0 (5)	Canada	21–0
November 16, 2007	Japan Softball Cup	Yokohama, Japan	United States	4–1	China	22–0
November 17, 2007	Japan Softball Cup	Yokohama, Japan	United States	5–1	Australia	23–0
November 17, 2007	Japan Softball Cup	Yokohama, Japan	Japan	5–2	United States	23–1
November 18, 2007	Japan Softball Cup	Yokohama, Japan	United States	3–2 (11)	Japan	24–1

=== 2008 ===
Date	Event	Location	Winner	Score	Loser	Yearly Record
June 7, 2008	Olympic Preview	Oklahoma City, OK	United States	9–5	Canada	1–0
June 8, 2008	Olympic Preview	Oklahoma City, OK	United States	7–0	China	2–0
August 12, 2008	Summer Olympics	Beijing, China	United States	11–0 (5)	Venezuela	3–0
August 13, 2008	Summer Olympics	Beijing, China	United States	3–0	Australia	4–0
August 14, 2008	Summer Olympics	Beijing, China	United States	8–1	Canada	5–0
August 15, 2008	Summer Olympics	Beijing, China	United States	7–0 (5)	Japan	6–0
August 16, 2008	Summer Olympics	Beijing, China	United States	7–0 (5)	Chinese Taipei	7–0
August 17, 2008	Summer Olympics	Beijing, China	United States	8–0 (5)	Netherlands	8–0
August 18, 2008	Summer Olympics	Beijing, China	United States	9–0 (5)	China	9–0
August 20, 2008	Summer Olympics	Beijing, China	United States	4–1 (9)	Japan	10–0
August 21, 2008	Summer Olympics	Beijing, China	Japan	3–1	United States	10–1

=== 2009 ===
Date	Event	Location	Winner	Score	Loser	Yearly Record
July 4, 2009	Canada Cup	Surrey, Canada	United States	7–0 (5)	Netherlands	1–0
July 4, 2009	Canada Cup	Surrey, Canada	United States	7–0 (5)	Australia	2–0
July 5, 2009	Canada Cup	Surrey, Canada	United States	8–1 (6)	Venezuela	3–0
July 6, 2009	Canada Cup	Surrey, Canada	United States	10–0 (4)	Canada	4–0
July 7, 2009	Canada Cup	Surrey, Canada	United States	7–0 (5)	Australia	5–0
July 8, 2009	Canada Cup	Surrey, Canada	United States	8–0 (5)	Netherlands	6–0
July 8, 2009	Canada Cup	Surrey, Canada	United States	10–0	Venezuela	7–0
July 9, 2009	Canada Cup	Surrey, Canada	United States	3–2	Canada	8–0
July 10, 2009	Canada Cup	Surrey, Canada	United States	10–0 (4)	CA Gold Rush	9–0
July 10, 2009	Canada Cup	Surrey, Canada	United States	2–0	Australia	10–0
July 11, 2009	Canada Cup	Surrey, Canada	United States	3–0	Canada	11–0
July 12, 2009	Canada Cup	Surrey, Canada	United States	3–2	Canada	12–0
July 16, 2009	World Cup of Softball	Oklahoma City, OK	United States	7–2	Netherlands	13–0
July 17, 2009	World Cup of Softball	Oklahoma City, OK	United States	12–0	Italy	14–0
July 18, 2009	World Cup of Softball	Oklahoma City, OK	United States	14–0 (4)	Canada	15–0
July 18, 2009	World Cup of Softball	Oklahoma City, OK	United States	6–1	Japan	16–0
July 19, 2009	World Cup of Softball	Oklahoma City, OK	United States	8–0 (5)	Australia	17–0
July 20, 2009	World Cup of Softball	Oklahoma City, OK	United States	3–1	Australia	18–0
July 31, 2009	Japan Softball Cup	Sendai City, Japan	United States	11–3 (5)	Australia	19–0
August 1, 2009	Japan Softball Cup	Sendai City, Japan	United States	10–2 (5)	Chinese Taipei	20–0
August 1, 2009	Japan Softball Cup	Sendai City, Japan	United States	3–0	Japan	21–0
August 2, 2009	Japan Softball Cup	Sendai City, Japan	United States	2–0	Japan	22–0

=== 2010 ===
Date	Event	Location	Winner	Score	Loser	Yearly Record
June 24, 2010	World Championship	Caracas, Venezuela	United States	1–0	China	1–0
June 25, 2010	World Championship	Caracas, Venezuela	United States	12–2 (4)	New Zealand	2–0
June 25, 2010	World Championship	Caracas, Venezuela	United States	7–0 (5)	Venezuela	3–0
June 26, 2010	World Championship	Caracas, Venezuela	United States	20–0 (3)	Botswana	4–0
June 27, 2010	World Championship	Caracas, Venezuela	United States	9–2 (5)	Australia	5–0
June 28, 2010	World Championship	Caracas, Venezuela	United States	10–1 (5)	Dominican Republic	6–0
June 29, 2010	World Championship	Caracas, Venezuela	United States	9–0 (5)	Czech Republic	7–0
June 30, 2010	World Championship	Caracas, Venezuela	United States	16–1 (5)	Canada	8–0
July 1, 2010	World Championship	Caracas, Venezuela	United States	4–0	Japan	9–0
July 2, 2010	World Championship	Caracas, Venezuela	United States	7–0 (5)	Japan	10–0
July 22, 2010	World Cup of Softball	Oklahoma City, OK	United States	9–0	Canada	11–0
July 23, 2010	World Cup of Softball	Oklahoma City, OK	United States	5–0	Japan	12–0
July 24, 2010	World Cup of Softball	Oklahoma City, OK	United States	1–0	US Futures	13–0
July 24, 2010	World Cup of Softball	Oklahoma City, OK	United States	8–0	Japan	14–0
July 25, 2010	World Cup of Softball	Oklahoma City, OK	Canada	5–2	United States	14–1
July 26, 2010	World Cup of Softball	Oklahoma City, OK	United States	3–0	US Futures	15–1
July 26, 2010	World Cup of Softball	Oklahoma City, OK	United States	5–1	Japan	16–1
August 6, 2010	Japan Softball Cup	Japan	United States	4–3	Chinese Taipei	17–1
August 7, 2010	Japan Softball Cup	Japan	Japan	3–1	United States	17–2
August 7, 2010	Japan Softball Cup	Japan	United States	6–2	Chinese Taipei	18–2
August 8, 2010	Japan Softball Cup	Japan	United States	5–0	Japan	19–2

=== 2011 ===
Date	Event	Location	Winner	Score	Loser	Yearly Record
July 21, 2011	World Cup of Softball	Oklahoma City, OK	United States	7–2	Czech Republic	1–0
July 22, 2011	World Cup of Softball	Oklahoma City, OK	United States	5–2	Australia	2–0
July 23, 2011	World Cup of Softball	Oklahoma City, OK	Canada	4–3	United States	2–1
July 23, 2011	World Cup of Softball	Oklahoma City, OK	United States	8–4	Japan	3–1
July 24, 2011	World Cup of Softball	Oklahoma City, OK	United States	10–0 (4)	Great Britain	4–1
July 25, 2011	World Cup of Softball	Oklahoma City, OK	United States	6–4	Japan	5–1
October 17, 2011	Pan American Games	Guadalajara, Mexico	United States	10–0 (4)	Venezuela	6–1
October 18, 2011	Pan American Games	Guadalajara, Mexico	United States	10–0 (4)	Dominican Republic	7–1
October 18, 2011	Pan American Games	Guadalajara, Mexico	United States	7–0 (5)	Mexico	8–1
October 19, 2011	Pan American Games	Guadalajara, Mexico	United States	3–0	Cuba	9–1
October 19, 2011	Pan American Games	Guadalajara, Mexico	United States	4–1	Puerto Rico	10–1
October 20, 2011	Pan American Games	Guadalajara, Mexico	United States	12–5	Canada	11–1
October 21, 2011	Pan American Games	Guadalajara, Mexico	United States	8–0 (6)	Argentina	12–1
October 22, 2011	Pan American Games	Guadalajara, Mexico	United States	13–1 (5)	Cuba	13–1
October 23, 2011	Pan American Games	Guadalajara, Mexico	United States	11–1 (4)	Canada	14–1

=== 2012 ===
Date	Event	Location	Winner	Score	Loser	Yearly Record
June 23, 2012	40th Anniversary Title IX Game	Oklahoma City, OK	United States	9–1	Canada	1–0
June 28, 2012	World Cup of Softball	Oklahoma City, OK	United States	8–0	Puerto Rico	2–0
June 29, 2012	World Cup of Softball	Oklahoma City, OK	United States	3–1	Australia	3–0
June 30, 2012	World Cup of Softball	Oklahoma City, OK	United States	2–1	Netherlands	4–0
June 30, 2012	World Cup of Softball	Oklahoma City, OK	United States	9–0 (5)	Canada	5–0
July 1, 2012	World Cup of Softball	Oklahoma City, OK	United States	9–0	Brazil	6–0
July 2, 2012	World Cup of Softball	Oklahoma City, OK	United States	3–0	Australia	7–0
July 13, 2012	World Championship	Whitehorse, Canada	United States	7–0	Venezuela	8–0
July 14, 2012	World Championship	Whitehorse, Canada	United States	10–0	Czech Republic	9–0
July 15, 2012	World Championship	Whitehorse, Canada	United States	13–0	Puerto Rico	10–0
July 16, 2012	World Championship	Whitehorse, Canada	United States	17–0	South Africa	11–0
July 18, 2012	World Championship	Whitehorse, Canada	United States	13–0	China	12–0
July 18, 2012	World Championship	Whitehorse, Canada	United States	4–0	Netherlands	13–0
July 19, 2012	World Championship	Whitehorse, Canada	United States	14–1	Argentina	14–0
July 20, 2012	World Championship	Whitehorse, Canada	United States	4–2	Canada	15–0
July 21, 2012	World Championship	Whitehorse, Canada	United States	3–1 (8)	Japan	16–0
July 22, 2012	World Championship	Whitehorse, Canada	Japan	2–1	United States	16–1

=== 2013 ===
Date	Event	Location	Winner	Score	Loser	Yearly Record
July 11, 2013	World Cup of Softball	Oklahoma City, OK	United States	7–0 (5)	Canada	1–0
July 12, 2013	World Cup of Softball	Oklahoma City, OK	United States	4–0	Australia	2–0
July 13, 2013	World Cup of Softball	Oklahoma City, OK	Japan	7–4	United States	2–1
July 14, 2013	World Cup of Softball	Oklahoma City, OK	United States	10–3	Puerto Rico	3–1
July 14, 2013	World Cup of Softball	Oklahoma City, OK	Japan	6–3	United States	3–2
July 16, 2013	Canadian Open	Surrey, British Columbia, Canada	United States	4–1	California A's	4–2
July 17, 2013	Canadian Open	Surrey, British Columbia, Canada	United States	10–3 (6)	Japan	5–2
July 18, 2013	Canadian Open	Surrey, British Columbia, Canada	United States	5–4	Australia	6–2
July 18, 2013	Canadian Open	Surrey, British Columbia, Canada	United States	8–1	Venezuela	7–2
July 19, 2013	Canadian Open	Surrey, British Columbia, Canada	United States	8–5	Canada	8–2
July 20, 2013	Canadian Open	Surrey, British Columbia, Canada	United States	7–4	Canada	9–2
July 21, 2013	Canadian Open	Surrey, British Columbia, Canada	Japan	5–0	United States	9–3
July 22, 2013	Canadian Open	Surrey, British Columbia, Canada	Australia	2–1	United States	9–4
August 10, 2013	Pan American Games Qualifier	San Juan, Puerto Rico, United States	United States	16–0 (3)	Colombia	10–4
August 11, 2013	Pan American Games Qualifier	San Juan, Puerto Rico, United States	United States	11–0 (5)	Brazil	11–4
August 12, 2013	Pan American Games Qualifier	San Juan, Puerto Rico, United States	United States	5–1	Cuba	12–4
August 13, 2013	Pan American Games Qualifier	San Juan, Puerto Rico, United States	United States	12–0	Colombia	13–4
August 14, 2013	Pan American Games Qualifier	San Juan, Puerto Rico, United States	United States	7–0 (5)	Argentina	14–4
August 15, 2013	Pan American Games Qualifier	San Juan, Puerto Rico, United States	United States	12–0 (4)	U.S. Virgin Islands	15–4
August 16, 2013	Pan American Games Qualifier	San Juan, Puerto Rico, United States	United States	8–2	Canada	16–4
August 17, 2013	Pan American Games Qualifier	San Juan, Puerto Rico, United States	United States	5–0	Cuba	17–4
August 18, 2013	Pan American Games Qualifier	San Juan, Puerto Rico, United States	United States	8–1 (5)	Canada	18–4

=== 2014 ===
Date	Event	Location	Winner	Score	Loser	Yearly Record
July 8, 2014	World Cup of Softball	Irvine, CA	United States	5–0	Venezuela	1–0
July 9, 2014	World Cup of Softball	Irvine, CA	United States	13–1 (5)	Philippines	2–0
July 10, 2014	World Cup of Softball	Irvine, CA	United States	5–3	Canada	3–0
July 11, 2014	World Cup of Softball	Irvine, CA	United States	8–1 (5)	Japan	4–0
July 12, 2014	World Cup of Softball	Irvine, CA	United States	3–2	Mexico	5–0
July 12, 2014	World Cup of Softball	Irvine, CA	United States	14–0 (4)	Chinese Taipei	6–0
July 13, 2014	World Cup of Softball	Irvine, CA	United States	5–2	Canada	7–0
July 15, 2014	2014 Canadian Open	Surrey, BC	United States	8–0 (5)	Bloomington Lady Hearts	8–0
July 15, 2014	2014 Canadian Open	Surrey, BC	Japan	9–2 (5)	United States	8–1
July 16, 2014	2014 Canadian Open	Surrey, BC	United States	10–0 (4)	Basque Country (Spain)	9–1
July 17, 2014	2014 Canadian Open	Surrey, BC	United States	4–3	NJCAA All-Stars	10–1
July 17, 2014	2014 Canadian Open	Surrey, BC	United States	7–0 (5)	Mexico	11–1
July 18, 2014	2014 Canadian Open	Surrey, BC	United States	8–4	Canada	12–1
July 19, 2014	2014 Canadian Open	Surrey, BC	United States	10–0 (3)	White Rock Renegades	13–1
July 19, 2014	2014 Canadian Open	Surrey, BC	Canada	10–6	United States	13–2
July 20, 2014	2014 Canadian Open	Surrey, BC	United States	5–0	NJCAA All-Stars	14–2
July 20, 2014	2014 Canadian Open	Surrey, BC	United States	10–0 (3)	Mexico	15–2
July 21, 2014	2014 Canadian Open	Surrey, BC	United States	9–2 (5)	Canada	16–2
July 21, 2014	2014 Canadian Open	Surrey, BC	Japan	7–0 (5)	United States	16–3
August 15, 2014	2014 ISF Women's World Championship	Haarlem, Netherlands	United States	10–0 (4)	Netherlands	17–3
August 16, 2014	2014 ISF Women's World Championship	Haarlem, Netherlands	United States	7–0 (5)	Botswana	18–3
August 17, 2014	2014 ISF Women's World Championship	Haarlem, Netherlands	United States	5–1	Chinese Taipei	19–3
August 18, 2014	2014 ISF Women's World Championship	Haarlem, Netherlands	United States	11–0 (4)	Great Britain	20–3
August 19, 2014	2014 ISF Women's World Championship	Haarlem, Netherlands	United States	4–2	Australia	21–3
August 20, 2014	2014 ISF Women's World Championship	Haarlem, Netherlands	United States	10–0 (4)	Dominican Republic	22–3
August 21, 2014	2014 ISF Women's World Championship	Haarlem, Netherlands	United States	7–0 (5)	Italy	23–3
August 22, 2014	2014 ISF Women's World Championship	Haarlem, Netherlands	United States	6–1	Canada	24–3
August 23, 2014	2014 ISF Women's World Championship	Haarlem, Netherlands	Japan	6–1	United States	24–4
August 24, 2014	2014 ISF Women's World Championship	Haarlem, Netherlands	United States	8–1 (6)	Australia	25–4
August 24, 2014	2014 ISF Women's World Championship	Haarlem, Netherlands	Japan	4–1	United States	25–5
