= 2016 World Cup of Softball =

2016 World Cup of Softball XI
Tournament details
- Host country: United States
- City: Oklahoma City, Oklahoma
- Dates: July 5-10, 2016
- Teams: 14 (from 6 continents)
- Venues: ASA Hall of Fame Stadium
- Defending champions: United States (2015)

Final positions
- Champions: Japan (3rd title)
- Runner-up: United States
- Third place: Australia

Tournament statistics
- Games played: 47
- Best batting average: (United States) Delaney Spaulding (0.529)
- Best ERA: (Japan) Yukani Hamamura (0.00) (United States) Ally Carda (0.00) (Japan) Nana Okamura (0.00)
- Most strikeouts (as pitcher): (Australia) Justine Smethurst (25)

The eleventh World Cup of Softball was held from July 5, 2016 to July 10, 2016, in Oklahoma City. The competing national teams were Australia, Canada, China, Chinese Taipei, Czech Republic, Japan, Mexico, Netherlands, New Zealand, Philippines, Puerto Rico, United States, United States Elite, and Venezuela.

== Standings ==
=== Group A ===
Rank	Team	Wins	Losses	GB
1	United States	6	0	-
2	Australia	6	1	0.5
3	Puerto Rico	4	2	2
4	China	3	4	3.5
5	Netherlands	2	5	4.5
6	Philippines	1	6	5.5
7	Venezuela	0	6	6

=== Group B ===
Rank	Team	Wins	Losses	GB
1	Japan	6	0	-
2	United States Elite	4	1	1.5
3	Canada	4	2	2
4	New Zealand	2	4	4
5	Mexico	2	4	4
6	Czech Republic	0	5	5.5

== Schedule and scores ==
all times CDT

Date	Team 1	Score	Team 2	Time
July 5, 2016	China	1-2	Mexico	10:30 AM
July 5, 2016	United States Elite	13-2 (4)	Czech Republic	12:30 PM
July 5, 2016	Netherlands	2-7	Australia	12:30 PM
July 5, 2016	United States	11-1 (4)	Philippines	3 PM
July 5, 2016	Canada	5-0	New Zealand	3 PM
July 5, 2016	Venezuela	2-3	Puerto Rico	5 PM
July 6, 2016	Australia	6-1	Venezuela	10:30 AM
July 6, 2016	United States Elite	17-0 (3)	Mexico	12:30 PM
July 6, 2016	Canada	9-1 (5)	Netherlands	12:30 PM
July 6, 2016	United States	7-0 (6)	Puerto Rico	3 PM
July 6, 2016	Philippines	1-8 (5)	China	3 PM
July 6, 2016	Czech Republic	0-8 (5)	Japan	5 PM
July 7, 2016	Netherlands	4-3 (8)	Venezuela	10:30 AM
July 7, 2016	Australia	7-6	New Zealand	10:30 AM
July 7, 2016	China	0-2	Puerto Rico	1 PM
July 7, 2016	Japan	8-3	Mexico	1 PM
July 7, 2016	Philippines	5-7	Puerto Rico	3 PM
July 7, 2016	Czech Republic	4-9	Mexico	3 PM
July 7, 2016	United States Elite	8-4	Canada	5:30 PM
July 7, 2016	Japan	11-0 (4)	Philippines	5:30 PM
July 7, 2016	United States	7-0 (6)	Australia	7:30 PM
July 7, 2016	China	9-2 (5)	Venezuela	7:30 PM
July 8, 2016	Czech Republic	—	Puerto Rico	8:30 AM
July 8, 2016	Mexico	1-4	Canada	8:30 AM
July 8, 2016	Czech Republic	0-2	New Zealand	10:30 AM
July 8, 2016	Philippines	2-1	Venezuela	10:30 AM
July 8, 2016	Japan	10-0 (4)	New Zealand	1 PM
July 8, 2016	Philippines	0-6	Netherlands	1 PM
July 8, 2016	Japan	7-2	Canada	3 PM
July 8, 2016	China	4-1	Netherlands	3 PM
July 8, 2016	United States	10-0 (4)	Venezuela	5:30 PM
July 8, 2016	Puerto Rico	0-8 (5)	Australia	5:30 PM
July 8, 2016	United States	—	United States Elite	7:30 PM
July 8, 2016	Australia	6-5 (8)	China	7:30 PM
July 9, 2016	United States Elite	13-0 (4)	New Zealand	12 PM
July 9, 2016	Canada	3-0	Czech Republic	12 PM
July 9, 2016	United States	8-1 (5)	Netherlands	2:30 PM
July 9, 2016	Australia	3-2	Philippines	2:30 PM
July 9, 2016	United States Elite	2-3	Japan	4:30 PM
July 9, 2016	New Zealand	3-2	Mexico	4:30 PM
July 9, 2016	United States	11-0 (4)	China	7 PM
July 9, 2016	Netherlands	4-5	Puerto Rico	7 PM

7th Place Game

July 10, 2016	China	2-1 (8)	New Zealand	ASA Hall of Fame Stadium

12th Place Game

July 10, 2016	Philippines	3-2	Czech Republic	ASA Hall of Fame Stadium

5th Place Game

July 10, 2016	Puerto Rico	0-5	Canada	ASA Hall of Fame Stadium

9th Place Game

July 10, 2016	Netherlands	7-0 (5)	Mexico	ASA Hall of Fame Stadium

Bronze Medal Game

July 10, 2016	Australia	4-3	United States Elite	ASA Hall of Fame Stadium

11th Place Game

July 10, 2016	Venezuela	3-1	Philippines	ASA Hall of Fame Stadium

Gold Medal Game

July 10, 2016	United States	1-2	Japan	ASA Hall of Fame Stadium
