= Ashley Charters =

American softball infielder

Ashley Deon Charters (born March 13, 1986) is an American, former collegiate All-American, retired professional 2-time All-Star right-handed softball infielder, originally from Beaverton, Oregon. She played college softball for the Washington Huskies softball as shortstop and second baseman and was part of the 2009 Women's College World Series championship team of the Pac-12 Conference. She is one of the select NCAA players in the 300 hits, 200 runs and 100 stolen base club. She later played two seasons with Team USA softball. After originally being drafted No. 11 in the National Pro Fastpitch, she went on to join the USSSA Pride and win a title in 2013.

== Career ==
Charters played for USSSA Pride of National Pro Fastpitch from 2011 to 2013, helping the Pride win the 2013 Cowles Cup championship before retiring from professional softball in February 2014. She also played on the United States women's national softball team, winning gold medals with the team in the 2009 World Cup of Softball, 2010 World Cup of Softball, and 2010 Women's Softball World Championship.

Since 2012, Charters has been co-CEO of headgear small business GlitterBandz.

== Statistics ==
Washington Huskies
YEAR	G	AB	R	H	BA	RBI	HR	3B	2B	TB	SLG	BB	SO	SB	SBA
2005	57	174	53	65	.373	18	1	1	5	75	.431%	25	48	33	38
2006	59	204	38	75	.367	25	1	5	6	94	.461%	11	53	27	29
2007	61	202	59	79	.391	33	7	4	9	117	.579%	29	32	36	41
2009	63	215	65	96	.446	33	9	6	10	145	.674%	27	23	37	42
TOTALS	240	795	215	315	.396	109	18	16	30	431	.542%	92	156	133	150
