= South Africa women's national softball team =

Information
- Country: South Africa
- Federation: Softball South Africa
- Confederation: WBSC Africa
- WBSC World Rank: 41 ▼2 (31 December 2024)

Women's Softball World Cup
- Appearances: 7 (First in 1974)
- Best result: 10th

South Africa women's national softball team is the national team for South Africa administered by Softball South Africa. The team competed at the 1998 ISF Women's World Championship in Fujinomiya City, Japan where they finished fifteenth. The team competed at the 2002 ISF Women's World Championship in Saskatoon, Saskatchewan where they finished fourteenth. The team competed at the 2006 ISF Women's World Championship in Beijing, China where they finished fifteenth. The team competed at the 2010 ISF Women's World Championship in Caracas, Venezuela where they finished fifteenth.

== Competition results ==
=== World Cup ===
World Cup Record (Note: World Championship until 2018)
Year	Position
(Australia) 1965	Did not participate
(Japan) 1970	Banned
(United States) 1974	10th place
(El Salvador) 1978	Did not participate
(Taiwan) 1982	Did not participate
(New Zealand) 1986	Did not participate
(United States) 1990	Did not participate
(Japan) 1994	Did not participate
(Japan) 1998	15th place
(Canada) 2002	14th place
(China) 2006	15th place
(Venezuela) 2010	15th place
(Canada) 2012	Did not participate
(Netherlands) 2014	Did not participate
(Canada) 2016	15th place
(Japan) 2018	14th place
(United States) 2022 (Note: The World Games tournament also serves as the World Championship)	Did not qualify
(Republic of Ireland) (Italy) (Spain) 2024	12th place
Total	8/18
