= Softball at the 2023 Pan American Games =

- Softball pictogram
- Venues: Baseball and Softball Center
- Start date: October 30, 2023
- End date: November 4, 2023
- No. of events: 1 (1 women)
- Competitors: 128 from 8 nations

Medalists
Gold medal	United States
Silver medal	Puerto Rico
Bronze medal	Canada

Softball competitions at the 2023 Pan American Games in Santiago, Chile are scheduled to be held from October 30 to November 4. The venue for the competition is the Baseball and Softball Center located in the Cerrillos commune of Santiago.

A total of eight women's teams (each consisting up to 16 athletes) will compete in each tournament. This means a total of 144 athletes are scheduled to compete.

== Qualification ==
A total of eight women's team qualified to compete at the games. The host nation (Chile) qualified automatically, along with the champions of the 2021 Junior Pan American Games and the top six teams at the 2022 Pan American Championships.

Event	Dates	Location	Quota(s)	Qualified
Host Nation	—N/a	—N/a	1	Chile
2021 Junior Pan American Games	—N/a	—N/a	1	United States
2022 Pan American Championships	12–19 November	Guatemala City	6	Canada; Cuba; Puerto Rico; Venezuela; Mexico; Peru
Total			8	

== Participating nations ==
A total of 8 countries qualified softball teams.

- Canada (18)
- Chile (18)
- Cuba (18)
- Mexico (18)
- Peru (18)
- Puerto Rico (18)
- United States (18)
- Venezuela (18)

== Medalists ==
Event	Gold	Silver	Bronze
Women's tournament	United States	Puerto Rico	Canada

== Opening round ==
All times are local (UTC−3).

=== Group A ===
Pos	Team	Pld	W	L	RF	RA	PCT	GB	Qualification
1	United States	3	3	0	34	2	1.000	—	Super Round
2	Mexico	3	2	1	17	9	.667	1	Super Round
3	Venezuela	3	1	2	17	18	.333	2	Fifth place game
4	Chile (H)	3	0	3	0	39	.000	3	Seventh place game

Source: Santiago 2023 and WBSC Americas
(H) Hosts

October 29; 10:00	Mexico	9–2 (F/6)	Venezuela	Baseball and Softball Center, Santiago
October 29; 10:00		Boxscore		Baseball and Softball Center, Santiago

October 29; 16:00	Chile	0–18 (F/3)	United States	Baseball and Softball Center, Santiago
October 29; 16:00		Boxscore		Baseball and Softball Center, Santiago

October 30; 13:00	United States	9–2 (F/6)	Venezuela	Baseball and Softball Center, Santiago
October 30; 13:00		Boxscore		Baseball and Softball Center, Santiago

October 30; 16:00	Chile	0–8 (F/5)	Mexico	Baseball and Softball Center, Santiago
October 30; 16:00		Boxscore		Baseball and Softball Center, Santiago

October 31; 16:00	Venezuela	13–0 (F/4)	Chile	Baseball and Softball Center, Santiago
October 31; 16:00		Boxscore		Baseball and Softball Center, Santiago

November 1; 13:00	Mexico	0–7 (F/5)	United States	Baseball and Softball Center, Santiago
November 1; 13:00		Boxscore		Baseball and Softball Center, Santiago

=== Group B ===
Pos	Team	Pld	W	L	RF	RA	PCT	GB	Qualification
1	Puerto Rico	3	3	0	8	3	1.000	—	Super Round
2	Canada	3	2	1	16	3	.667	1	Super Round
3	Cuba	3	1	2	5	6	.333	2	Fifth place game
4	Peru	3	0	3	0	17	.000	3	Seventh place game

Source: Santiago 2023 and WBSC Americas

October 29; 13:00	Cuba	0–4	Canada	Baseball and Softball Center, Santiago
October 29; 13:00		Boxscore		Baseball and Softball Center, Santiago

October 30; 10:00	Peru	0–3	Puerto Rico	Baseball and Softball Center, Santiago
October 30; 10:00		Boxscore		Baseball and Softball Center, Santiago

October 31; 10:00	Canada	10–0 (F/5)	Peru	Baseball and Softball Center, Santiago
October 31; 10:00		Boxscore		Baseball and Softball Center, Santiago

October 31; 13:00	Cuba	1–2	Puerto Rico	Baseball and Softball Center, Santiago
October 31; 13:00		Boxscore		Baseball and Softball Center, Santiago

November 1; 10:00	Peru	0–4	Cuba	Baseball and Softball Center, Santiago
November 1; 10:00		Boxscore		Baseball and Softball Center, Santiago

November 1; 16:00	Puerto Rico	3–2	Canada	Baseball and Softball Center, Santiago
November 1; 16:00		Boxscore		Baseball and Softball Center, Santiago

== Placement games ==
=== Seventh place game ===
November 2; 10:00	Chile	0–10 (F/4)	Peru	Baseball and Softball Center, Santiago
November 2; 10:00		Boxscore		Baseball and Softball Center, Santiago

=== Fifth place game ===
November 2; 13:00	Cuba	4–0	Venezuela	Baseball and Softball Center, Santiago
November 2; 13:00		Boxscore		Baseball and Softball Center, Santiago

== Super Round ==
Pos	Team	Pld	W	L	RF	RA	PCT	GB	Qualification
1	United States	3	3	0	26	6	1.000	—	Gold medal game
2	Puerto Rico	3	2	1	7	13	.667	1	Gold medal game
3	Canada	3	1	2	11	12	.333	2	Bronze medal game
4	Mexico	3	0	3	1	14	.000	3	Bronze medal game

Source: Santiago 2023 and WBSC Americas

November 2; 16:00	Canada	6–1	Mexico	Baseball and Softball Center, Santiago
November 2; 16:00		Boxscore		Baseball and Softball Center, Santiago

November 3; 10:00	Puerto Rico	3–11 (F/6)	United States	Baseball and Softball Center, Santiago
November 3; 10:00		Boxscore		Baseball and Softball Center, Santiago

November 3; 13:00	Canada	3–8	United States	Baseball and Softball Center, Santiago
November 3; 13:00		Boxscore		Baseball and Softball Center, Santiago

November 3; 16:00	Mexico	0–1	Puerto Rico	Baseball and Softball Center, Santiago
November 3; 16:00		Boxscore		Baseball and Softball Center, Santiago

== Medal games ==
=== Bronze medal game ===
November 4; 10:00	Mexico	0–7 (F/5)	Canada (bronze)	Baseball and Softball Center, Santiago
November 4; 10:00		Boxscore		Baseball and Softball Center, Santiago

=== Gold medal game ===
November 4; 13:00	(silver) Puerto Rico	0–7 (F/6)	United States (gold)	Baseball and Softball Center, Santiago
November 4; 13:00		Boxscore		Baseball and Softball Center, Santiago

== Final standings ==
Pos	Team	Record
Gold medal	United States	6–0
Silver medal	Puerto Rico	4–2
Bronze medal	Canada	4–2
4	Mexico	2–4
5	Cuba	2–2
6	Venezuela	1–3
7	Peru	1–3
8	Chile	0–4
