= 1998 Women's Softball World Championship =

Women's Softball World Championship

Tournament details
- Host country: Japan
- Teams: 17

Final positions
- Champions: United States (6th title)
- Runner-up: Australia
- Third place: Japan
- Fourth place: China

The 1998 ISF Women's World Championship for softball was held July 20–30, 1998 in Fujinomiya, Shizuoka, Japan. A fourth straight title was won by the team from the United States, coached by Margie Wright, which avenged its only loss of the tournament to Australia by a 1-0 margin in the final.

== Pool Play ==
=== Group I ===
	GP	W	L
United States	8	8	0
Canada	8	6	2
Italy	8	6	2
Chinese Taipei	8	5	3
Netherlands	8	4	4
Czech Republic	8	3	5
Colombia	8	3	5
South Africa	8	1	7
Denmark	8	0	8

=== Group II ===
	GP	W	L
Australia	7	7	0
Japan	7	6	1
China	7	5	2
Venezuela	7	3	4
Netherlands Antilles	7	3	4
New Zealand	7	3	4
South Korea	7	1	6
Philippines	7	0	7

== Playoffs ==
=== Day One ===
Italy	1-0	Venezuela
China	7-0	Chinese Taipei
United States	1-0	Japan
Australia	1-0	Canada

Venezuela and Chinese Taipei Eliminated.

=== Day Two ===
Japan	2-0	Italy
China	3-0	Canada

Italy and Canada Eliminated.

=== Day Three ===
Canada	1-0	Italy

=== Medal Round ===
Day Two
A1	United States	1
B1	Australia	2
B2	Japan	3
B3	China	0

Bronze Medal
A1	United States	4
B2	Japan	0

Gold Medal
B1	Australia	0
A1	United States	1
