= 2002 Women's Softball World Championship =

Women's Softball World Championship

Tournament details
- Host country: Canada
- Teams: 16

Final positions
- Champions: United States (7th title)
- Runner-up: Japan
- Third place: Chinese Taipei
- Fourth place: China

The 2002 ISF Women's World Championship for softball was held July 26-August 4, 2002 in Saskatoon, Canada. The United States, which went undefeated for the tournament, won a fifth straight world championship with a 1-0 victory over Japan. The first four teams qualified for the 2004 Olympics.

== Pool Play ==
=== Group A ===
	GP	W	L	RF	RA
United States	7	7	0	53	0
China	7	6	1	40	5
Chinese Taipei	7	5	2	18	12
Italy	7	4	3	11	8
Canada	7	3	4	14	11
Netherlands Antilles	7	1	6	3	24
Russia	7	1	6	4	40
Czech Republic	7	1	6	7	50

=== Group B ===
	GP	W	L	RF	RA
Japan	7	7	0	48	1
Australia	7	6	1	49	8
New Zealand	7	5	2	37	17
Puerto Rico	7	4	3	18	38
Venezuela	7	3	4	28	28
Netherlands	7	2	5	31	36
South Africa	7	1	6	10	45
Dominican Republic	7	0	7	16	66

== Playoffs ==
=== Day One ===
Chinese Taipei	5-1	Puerto Rico
New Zealand	3-0	Italy
United States	4-3	Australia
Japan	5-0	China

Puerto Rico and Italy Eliminated.

=== Day Two ===
Australia	2-4	Chinese Taipei
China	4-2	New Zealand

Australia and New Zealand Eliminated.

=== Medal Round ===
Day Two
A1	United States	1
B1	Japan	0
A2	China	5
A3	Chinese Taipei	6

Bronze Medal
B1	Japan	2
A3	Chinese Taipei	1

Gold Medal
A1	'United States	1
B1	Japan	0

== Final ranking ==
(gold) United States

(silver) Japan

(bronze) Chinese Taipei

4. China

5. Australia

6. New Zealand

7. Italy

8. Puerto Rico

9. Canada

10. Venezuela

11. Netherlands

12. Netherlands Antilles

13. Russia

14. South Africa

15. Czech Republic

16. Dominican Republic
