= 2007 World Cup of Softball =

Tournament details
- Host country: United States
- City: Oklahoma City, Oklahoma
- Dates: July 12 - July 16
- Teams: 6 (from 3 continents)
- Defending champions: United States (2006)

Final positions
- Champions: United States (2nd title)
- Runner-up: Japan
- Third place: Canada
- Fourth place: China

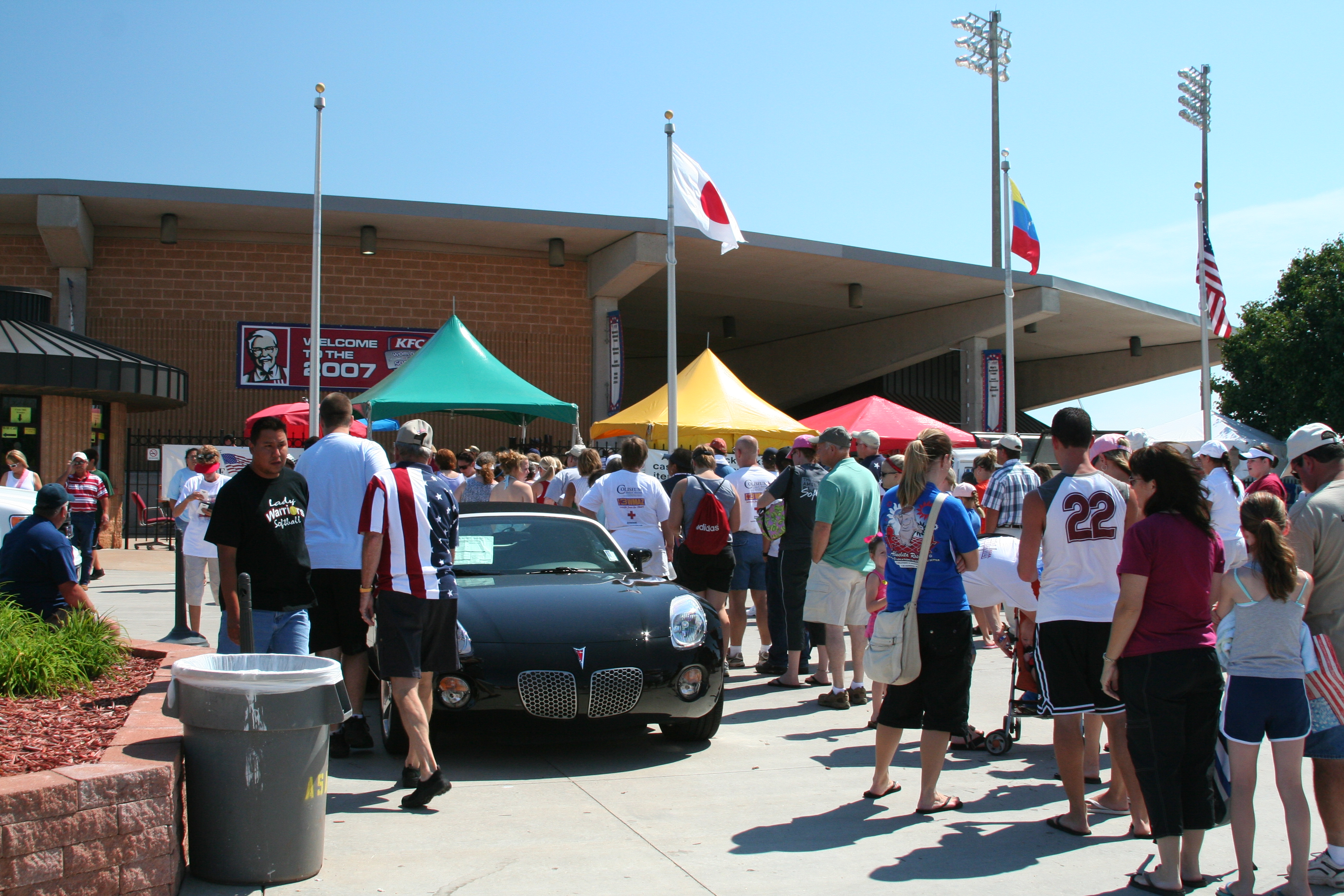
View of the crowd outside ASA Hall of Fame Stadium on August 22, 2007

The third World Cup of Softball was held in Oklahoma City, Oklahoma USA between July 12 and July 16, 2007. USA won their second World Cup by defeating Japan 3-0 in the Championship Game.

== Final standings ==
Rank	Team	Wins	Losses	Runs For	Runs Allowed
1	United States	6	0	40	2
2	Japan	4	2	18	9
3	Canada	4	2	23	18
4	China	2	4	11	24
5	Venezuela	2	4	15	28
6	Dominican Republic	0	6	4	30

== Position Round ==
Date	Game	Winner	Score	Loser	Notes
July 16	First Place Game	United States	3-0	Japan	USA's second World Cup championship, Japan's second second-place finish
July 16	Third Place Game	Canada	8-2	China	Canada's second third-place finish, China's second fourth-place finish
July 16	Fifth Place Game	Venezuela	4-2	Dominican Republic	
