= Softball at the 2019 Pan American Games – Women's tournament =

Softball – Women's tournament at the 2019 Pan American Games
- Venues: Softball Field, Villa María del Triunfo
- Start date: 4 August 2019
- End date: 10 August 2019

Medalists
Gold medal	United States
Silver medal	Canada
Bronze medal	Puerto Rico

The Women's softball tournament at the 2019 Pan American Games in Lima, Peru will be held between 4 and 10 August 2019. Six nations will participate.

== Qualification ==
=== Men ===
A total of five nations qualified to compete. The host nation, Peru, automatically qualified.

Event	Dates	Location	Vacancies	Qualified
Host Nation	—N/a	—N/a	1	Peru
2017 Pan American Championships	4–13 August	(Dominican Republic) Santo Domingo	5	United States; Canada; Puerto Rico; Mexico; Venezuela
Total			6	

== Results ==
All times are in Peru Time. (UTC−5)

=== Preliminary round ===
Team	Pld	W	L	RF	RA	RD	Qualification
United States	5	5	0	37	1	+36	Qualified for the semifinals
Canada	5	4	1	23	7	+16	Qualified for the semifinals
Puerto Rico	5	3	2	18	12	+6	Qualified for the semifinals
Mexico	5	2	3	20	17	+3	Qualified for the semifinals
Venezuela	5	1	4	9	41	−32	
Peru	5	0	5	5	34	−29	

Home team in each game is listed first.

4 August 2019; 10:00	Canada	3–1	Puerto Rico	Campo de Softbol, Lima; Attendance: 357
4 August 2019; 10:00		Boxscore		Campo de Softbol, Lima; Attendance: 357

4 August 2019; 13:00	Mexico	0–9	United States	Campo de Softbol, Lima; Attendance: 1 013
4 August 2019; 13:00		Boxscore		Campo de Softbol, Lima; Attendance: 1 013

4 August 2019; 16:00	Venezuela	5–3	Peru	Campo de Softbol, Lima; Attendance: 1 160
4 August 2019; 16:00		Boxscore		Campo de Softbol, Lima; Attendance: 1 160

5 August 2019; 10:00	United States	6–0	Puerto Rico	Campo de Softbol, Lima; Attendance: 312
5 August 2019; 10:00		Boxscore		Campo de Softbol, Lima; Attendance: 312

5 August 2019; 13:00	Canada	8–0	Venezuela	Campo de Softbol, Lima; Attendance: 0
5 August 2019; 13:00		Boxscore		Campo de Softbol, Lima; Attendance: 0

5 August 2019; 16:00	Peru	0–9	Mexico	Campo de Softbol, Lima; Attendance: 416
5 August 2019; 16:00		Boxscore		Campo de Softbol, Lima; Attendance: 416

6 August 2019; 10:00	Canada	1–6	United States	Campo de Softbol, Lima; Attendance: 312
6 August 2019; 10:00		Boxscore		Campo de Softbol, Lima; Attendance: 312

6 August 2019; 13:00	Venezuela	3–11	Mexico	Campo de Softbol, Lima; Attendance: 32O
6 August 2019; 13:00		Boxscore		Campo de Softbol, Lima; Attendance: 32O

6 August 2019; 16:00	Peru	2–6	Puerto Rico	Campo de Softbol, Lima; Attendance: 525
6 August 2019; 16:00		Boxscore		Campo de Softbol, Lima; Attendance: 525

7 August 2019; 10:00	United States	9–0	Venezuela	Campo de Softbol, Lima; Attendance: 280
7 August 2019; 10:00		Boxscore		Campo de Softbol, Lima; Attendance: 280

7 August 2019; 13:00	Puerto Rico	1–0	Mexico	Campo de Softbol, Lima; Attendance: 0
7 August 2019; 13:00		Boxscore		Campo de Softbol, Lima; Attendance: 0

7 August 2019; 16:00	Peru	0–7	Canada	Campo de Softbol, Lima; Attendance: 453
7 August 2019; 16:00		Boxscore		Campo de Softbol, Lima; Attendance: 453

8 August 2019; 10:00	Puerto Rico	10–1	Venezuela	Campo de Softbol, Lima; Attendance: 0
8 August 2019; 10:00		Boxscore		Campo de Softbol, Lima; Attendance: 0

8 August 2019; 13:00	Mexico	0–4	Canada	Campo de Softbol, Lima; Attendance: 325
8 August 2019; 13:00		Boxscore		Campo de Softbol, Lima; Attendance: 325

8 August 2019; 16:00	United States	7–0	Peru	Campo de Softbol, Lima; Attendance: 524
8 August 2019; 16:00		Boxscore		Campo de Softbol, Lima; Attendance: 524

=== Medal round ===
Semifinals
1	United States	2
2	Canada	3
3	Puerto Rico	3
4	Mexico	2

Final
1	United States	3
3	Puerto Rico	1

Grand Final
1	United States	3
2	Canada	1

==== Semifinals ====
9 August 2019; 10:00	Puerto Rico	3–2	Mexico	Campo de Softbol, Lima; Attendance: 300
9 August 2019; 10:00		Boxscore		Campo de Softbol, Lima; Attendance: 300

9 August 2019; 14:00	United States	2 - 3	Canada	Campo de Softbol, Lima; Attendance: 540
9 August 2019; 14:00		Boxscore		Campo de Softbol, Lima; Attendance: 540

==== Final ====
10 August 2019; 10:00	United States	3–1	Puerto Rico	Campo de Softbol, Lima; Attendance: 650
10 August 2019; 10:00		Boxscore		Campo de Softbol, Lima; Attendance: 650

==== Grand Final ====
10 August 2019; 14:00	United States	3–1	Canada	Campo de Softbol, Lima; Attendance: 850
10 August 2019; 14:00		Boxscore		Campo de Softbol, Lima; Attendance: 850
