= Canada Cup International Softball Championship =

The Canada Cup is an annual international women's softball tournament held at the Softball City Complex in South Surrey, British Columbia. The tournament has expanded to include 2 U-17 and 2 U-19 divisions, and now takes place across 3 parks in Surrey and Delta. The international division plays exclusively at Softball City, whilst the minor divisions play games at Cloverdale Athletic Park and North Delta Community Park.

== Format ==
Following an announcement on June 13, 1991, by the International Softball Federation that women's fastpitch was being made a full-medal sport at the 1996 Summer Olympics in Atlanta, the Canada Cup was created to provide the Canadian national softball team with a world calibre team competition in order to help prepare for Olympic qualifying.

Although a number of US and Japanese club teams have competed in the Canada Cup, the showcase event has evolved primarily into a national team competition between the following countries:

- Australia
- China
- Canada
- Chinese Taipei
- Japan
- Netherlands
- Puerto Rico
- Venezuela
- Israel

This tournament enjoys strong local support with hundreds of community volunteers. Each team is assigned a bat girl from one of the local teams plus a family support liaison from the community. Another unusual part of this tournament is the concurrent co-ed Slow-Pitch Friendship Division tournament for developmentally disabled adults which is run at the same site as the premier International Women's Fastpitch tournament. Viewers can watch both at the same time.

== 2026 Tournament ==
The 2026 Canada Cup featured the following teams

- Canada
- Canada Elite
- China
- Chinese Taipei
- Chinese Taipei Development
- Venezuela
- (Czech Republic) Czechia
- Brazil
- Israel
- New Zealand - White Sox
- Peru
- Singapore
- American Samoa
- Saskatchewan 222's
- T.C Colorado

Canada went undefeated in the round robin, earning the top spot in the playoffs. They defeated Chinese Taipei 8-1, and China 14–1 to advance straight to the final. T.C Colorado, who had made the final each of the last four years, struggled, losing 9–1 to China in the winners bracket. They defeated Team Canada Elite 7–0 before playing Chinese Taipei, who beat them 12–11 in extra innings. Chinese Taipei would move on to face China in the semi-final, crashing out 8-1.

Canada would play China in the championship game. China scored the first runs, before Canada tied it at 2 all in the 4th. The Chinese would tack on one more, leading into the top of the 7th inning. Facing a possible shock defeat to the team they had beaten twice 14-1 and 16-4 earlier in the tournament, the Canadians rallied, scoring a 3 run homerun to take the lead 5-3, sealing the win with another 2 runs to be crowned champions at their home tournament for only the 3rd time.

== Tournament History ==
Year	Champions	Runners-up	Attendance
1993	Redding Rebels		43,968
1994	Redding Rebels		56,829
1995	California Commotion		70,108
1996	Canada		79,136
1998	Australia		95,869
1999	United States (Gold)	Australia	100,419
2000	Australia	China	109,814
2001	Japan (Red)	Australia	110,346
2002	United States (World)	United States (Elite)	122,504
2003	United States (Elite)	Australia	113,916
2004	Japan	Australia	91,201
2005	Australia	United States (Elite)	105,856
2006	Australia	Canada	112,676
2007	United States	Japan	119,301
2008	Japan	Australia	102,647
2009	United States	Canada	N/A
2010	Cancelled		
2011	United States	Japan	N/A
2012	Japan	United States	N/A
2013	Japan	Australia	N/A
2014	Japan	United States	N/A
2022	United States	T.C. Colorado	N/A
2023	Japan	T.C Colorado	N/A
2022	Canada	T.C Colorado	N/A
2025	T.C Colorado	Canada	N/A
2026	Canada	China	N/A

== Controversies ==
Israel's continued inclusion in the tournament is controversial, and protests by Pro-Palestinian activists have been hold outside of Softball City during their games over the last 3 years.
