= 1994 Women's Softball World Championship =

Women's Softball World Championship

Tournament details
- Host country: Canada
- Teams: 28

Final positions
- Champions: United States (5th title)
- Runner-up: China
- Third place: Australia
- Fourth place: Canada

The 1994 ISF Women's World Championship for softball was held July 29-August 7, 1994, in St. John's, Newfoundland. The United States won its third consecutive title with a 6-0 victory over China. The event had 28 participating countries, the largest amount in the event's history. The first five teams qualified for the Olympics, USA as host.

== Pool Play ==
=== Group A ===
| | GP | W | L | RF | RA |
|---|---|---|---|---|---|
| United States | 6 | 6 | 0 | 59 | 3 |
| Chinese Taipei | 6 | 5 | 1 | 45 | 6 |
| Cuba | 6 | 4 | 2 | 54 | 12 |
| South Korea | 6 | 3 | 3 | 24 | 48 |
| Spain | 6 | 2 | 4 | 20 | 54 |
| Great Britain | 6 | 1 | 5 | 26 | 63 |
| Moldova | 6 | 0 | 6 | 0 | 42 |

=== Group B ===
| | GP | W | L | RF | RA |
|---|---|---|---|---|---|
| New Zealand | 6 | 6 | 0 | 67 | 0 |
| Netherlands | 6 | 5 | 1 | 67 | 11 |
| Italy | 6 | 4 | 2 | 50 | 23 |
| Belgium | 6 | 3 | 3 | 31 | 34 |
| Colombia | 6 | 2 | 4 | 38 | 25 |
| Argentina | 6 | 1 | 5 | 28 | 47 |
| Croatia | 6 | 0 | 6 | 3 | 144 |

=== Group C ===
| | GP | W | L | RF | RA |
|---|---|---|---|---|---|
| China | 6 | 5 | 1 | 75 | 1 |
| Canada | 6 | 5 | 1 | 66 | 3 |
| Puerto Rico | 6 | 5 | 1 | 63 | 14 |
| Sweden | 6 | 3 | 3 | 24 | 57 |
| Czech Republic | 6 | 2 | 4 | 44 | 49 |
| Bermuda | 6 | 1 | 5 | 26 | 83 |
| Austria | 6 | 0 | 6 | 19 | 110 |

=== Group D ===
| | GP | W | L | RF | RA |
|---|---|---|---|---|---|
| Australia | 6 | 6 | 0 | 68 | 4 |
| Japan | 6 | 5 | 1 | 60 | 3 |
| Netherlands Antilles | 6 | 4 | 2 | 28 | 26 |
| Bahamas | 6 | 3 | 3 | 26 | 32 |
| Botswana | 6 | 2 | 4 | 11 | 47 |
| France | 6 | 1 | 5 | 18 | 43 |
| Ukraine | 6 | 0 | 6 | 1 | 57 |

== Playoffs ==
=== Round One ===
| Chinese Taipei | 4-0 | Japan |
| Canada | 9-0 | Netherlands |
| United States | 1-0 | Australia |
| China | 1-0 | New Zealand |

Japan and Netherlands Eliminated.

=== Round Two ===
| Australia | 1-0 | Chinese Taipei |
| Canada | 1-0 | New Zealand |

Chinese Taipei and New Zealand Eliminated.

=== Round Three ===
| United States | 2-0 | Australia |
| China | 5-0 | Canada |

=== 5th place playoff ===
| Chinese Taipei | 1-0 | New Zealand |

=== Medal Round ===
Day Two
A1 | United States | 2
C1 | China | 1
D1 | Australia | 1
C2 | Canada | 0

Bronze Medal
C1 | China | 1
D1 | Australia | 0

Gold Medal
A1 | United States | 6
C1 | China | 0
