= Softball at the 2013 Bolivarian Games =

Softball, for the 2013 Bolivarian Games, took place from 23 November to 30 November 2013. Women's under 23 team competed at these Games. The Dominican Republic won the gold medal ahead of silver medalists Venezuela and Colombia, Bronze.

== Medalists ==
Gold	Silver	Bronze
Dominican Republic; Johanna Bakli; Anyela Castillo; Anyelis Disla; Geraldina Féliz; Yanela Gómez; Yuderca Matos; Jippssi Núñez; Rosaury Pérez; Mary Reynoso; Cauris Rincón; Eduarda Rocha; Lisbeth Rodríguez; Saury Tejeda; Anabel Ulloa; Elizabeth Alcantara	Venezuela; Jesiuska Cabral; Osglimar Cruz; Juleitzis Díaz; Estefany Duno; Karla Estrada; Eila Infante; Giorianys Lara; Milagros Lozada; Osmary Orta; Alondra Pérez; Yarianny Pernalete; Anyibell Ramírez; Felianis Reyes; Daimari Salom; Eylix Soto; Freymar Suniaga; Génesis Uribe	Colombia; Alis Alean; Yina Ballesta; Sindy Bolaños; Paula Caraballo; Erika Díaz; Arleydis Guerrero; Disney Hernández; María Lambraño; Danisha Livingston; Suad López; Laura Beltran; Lorena Paez; Jaynis Peñata; Darlys Pérez; Ingrid Torres; Diana Urzola
