= 2006 World Cup of Softball =

Tournament details
- Host country: United States
- City: Oklahoma City, Oklahoma
- Dates: July 13 - July 17
- Teams: 6 (from 4 continents)
- Defending champions: Japan (2005)

Final positions
- Champions: United States (1st title)
- Runner-up: Japan
- Third place: Canada
- Fourth place: Australia

The second World Cup of Softball was held in Oklahoma City, Oklahoma USA between July 16 and July 20, 2010. USA won their third World Cup by defeating Australia 3-1 in the Championship game.

== Final standings ==
Rank	Team	Wins	Losses	Runs For	Runs Allowed
1	United States	6	0	59	3
2	Japan	3	2	17	27
3	Canada	5	2	20	12
4	Australia	2	4	17	20
5	China	2	4	17	28
6	Great Britain	0	6	9	53

== Position Round ==
Date	Game	Winner	Score	Loser	Notes
July 17	First Place Game	United States	5-2	Japan	
July 17	Third-place game	Canada	2-0	Australia	
July 17	Fifth Place Game	China	1-0	Great Britain	
