= 2015 World Cup of Softball =

2015 World Cup of Softball X
Tournament details
- Host country: United States
- City: Irvine, California
- Dates: June 29-July 5, 2015
- Teams: 8 (from 3 continents)
- Venues: Bill Barber Park
- Defending champions: United States (2014)

Final positions
- Champions: United States (8th title)
- Runner-up: Japan
- Third place: Puerto Rico
- Fourth place: Canada

Tournament statistics
- Games played: 32
- Best batting average: Suki Yamazaki (Japan)
- Best ERA: Yasmin Torres (Puerto Rico); Ally Carda (United States); Karissa Hovinga (Canada)
- Most strikeouts (as pitcher): Kelly Barnhill (United States Juniors)

The tenth World Cup of Softball was held between June 29-July 5, 2015 in Irvine, California. The competing national teams were the United States, Japan, Canada, Mexico, Argentina, United States Junior Team, Puerto Rico and Venezuela.

== Standings ==
Rank	Team	Wins	Losses	GB
1	United States	7	1	-
2	Japan	5	3	2
3	Puerto Rico	5	3	2
4	Canada	5	3	2
5	United States Juniors	4	4	3
6	Mexico	3	5	4
7	Venezuela	3	5	4
8	Argentina	0	8	7

== Schedule ==
all times PDT

Date	Team 1	Score	Team 2	Time
June 29, 2015	Argentina	0-2	Puerto Rico	9:00 am
June 29, 2015	Venezuela	5-6	Puerto Rico	11:30 am
June 29, 2015	Japan	10-0 (5)	Venezuela	2:00 pm
June 29, 2015	Argentina	0-14 (4)	United States Juniors	4:30 pm
June 29, 2015	Mexico	0-4	United States	7:00 pm
June 30, 2015	Canada	2-3	Japan	9:00 am
June 30, 2015	Japan	10-3 (6)	Mexico	11:30 am
June 30, 2015	Argentina	5-6 (8)	Venezuela	2:00 pm
June 30, 2015	United States Juniors	1-4	Canada	4:30 pm
June 30, 2015	Puerto Rico	1-14 (4)	United States	7:00 pm
July 1, 2015	Canada	9-4	Mexico	9:00 am
July 1, 2015	Venezuela	3-9	Mexico	11:30 pm
July 1, 2015	Canada	11-2 (5)	Puerto Rico	2:00 pm
July 1, 2015	Argentina	0-10 (4)	United States	4:30 pm
July 1, 2015	United States Juniors	2-3	United States	7:00 pm
July 2, 2015	Canada	2-3 (8)	Venezuela	11:30 am
July 2, 2015	Argentina	2-3 (8)	Mexico	2:00 pm
July 2, 2015	United States Juniors	1-2	Puerto Rico	4:30 pm
July 2, 2015	Japan	1-4	United States	7:00 pm
July 3, 2015	Mexico	4-2	Puerto Rico	11:30 am
July 3, 2015	Japan	7-0 (5)	Argentina	2:00 pm
July 3, 2015	Venezuela	4-10	United States Juniors	4:30 pm
July 3, 2015	Canada	4-1	United States	7:00 pm
July 4, 2015	Puerto Rico	3-2	Japan	9:00 am
July 4, 2015	Mexico	3-10 (5)	United States Juniors	11:30 am
July 4, 2015	Argentina	0-1	Canada	2:00 pm
July 4, 2015	Venezuela	0-7 (5)	United States	4:30 pm
July 4, 2015	United States Juniors	2-7	Japan	7:00 pm

July 5, 2015

7th 8th places

July 5, 2015	Venezuela	3-0	Argentina	Bill Barber Park

6th 5th places

July 5, 2015	United States Juniors	6-5	Mexico	Bill Barber Park

Bronze Medal Game

July 5, 2015	Canada	2-3	Puerto Rico	Bill Barber Park

Gold Medal Game

July 5, 2015	United States	6-1	Japan	Bill Barber Park
