= 2014 World Cup of Softball =

2014 World Cup of Softball IX
Tournament details
- Host country: United States
- City: Irvine, California
- Dates: July 7–13
- Teams: 7 (from 3 continents)
- Venues: Bill Barber Park
- Defending champions: Japan (2013)

Final positions
- Champions: United States (7th title)
- Runner-up: Canada
- Third place: Chinese Taipei
- Fourth place: Japan

The ninth World Cup of Softball was held between July 7–13, 2014 in Irvine, California. The competing national teams was the United States, Japan, Canada, Mexico, the Philippines, Chinese Taipei and Venezuela.

== Standings ==
Rank	Team	Wins	Losses	Runs For	Runs Allowed
1	United States	6	0	51	7
2	Canada	5	1	33	11
3	Chinese Taipei	3	3	28	12
4	Japan	3	3	33	25
5	Mexico	2	4	14	21
6	Philippines	1	5	6	36
7	Venezuela	1	5	8	19

== Schedule ==
all times PDT

Date	Winner	Score	Loser	Time	Stats
July 7, 2014	Philippines	3-0	Venezuela	11:00 am	
July 7, 2014	Venezuela	6-3	Chinese Taipei	2:00 pm	
July 7, 2014	Canada	11-4(5)	Japan	4:30 pm	
July 8, 2014	Japan	8(5)-1	Venezuela	11:00 am	
July 8, 2014	Mexico	7(5)-0	Philippines	2:00 pm	
July 8, 2014	Canada	3-2	Chinese Taipei	4:30 pm	
July 8, 2014	United States	5-0	Venezuela	7:00 pm	
July 9, 2014	Canada	3-1	Philippines	11:00 am	
July 9, 2014	Canada	8-2(8)	Venezuela	2:00 pm	
July 9, 2014	Japan	7-0(5)	Mexico	4:30 pm	
July 9, 2014	United States	13-1(5)	Philippines	7:00 pm	
July 10, 2014	Chinese Taipei	3-2	Mexico	3:30 pm	
July 10, 2014	United States	5-3	Canada	6:00 pm	
July 10, 2014	Japan	10-1(5)	Philippines	8:30 pm	
July 11, 2014	Mexico	1-0	Venezuela	10:00 am	
July 11, 2014	Chinese Taipei	16-1(4)	Philippines	12:30 pm	
July 11, 2014	United States	8-1(5)	Japan	6:00 pm	
July 12, 2014	United States	3-2	Mexico	10:00 am	
July 12, 2014	Canada	8-2	Mexico	12:30 pm	
July 12, 2014	United States	14-0(4)	Chinese Taipei	5:00 pm	
July 12, 2014	Chinese Taipei	4-3	Japan	7:00 pm	

13 July, 2014

6th 7th places

Venezuela 7-4 Philippines

5th 6th places

Mexico 0-4 Venezuela

Bronze medal game

Chinese Taipei 3-1 Japan

FINAL

United States 5-2 Canada
