= Aubree Munro =

American softball player (born 1993)

Personal information
- Born: October 4, 1993 (age 32) Brea, California, U.S.

Sport
- Sport: Softball
- Position: Catcher
- Team: Florida Gators (2013–2016) USSSA Pride (2016)
Medal record
Women's softball
Representing the United States
Olympic Games
Silver medal – second place	2020 Tokyo	Team
World Championships
Gold medal – first place	2016 Surrey	Team
Gold medal – first place	2018 Chiba	Team
World Cup of Softball
Silver medal – second place	2016 Oklahoma City	Team
Silver medal – second place	2017 Oklahoma City	Team
Pan American Games
Gold medal – first place	2019 Lima	Team

Aubree Arielle Munro Watson (née Munro; born October 4, 1993) is an American former professional softball catcher. She played college softball for the Florida Gators where she won two NCAA Championships, and played professionally for the USSSA Pride of the National Pro Fastpitch (NPF). She was a member of the United States women's national softball team, and represented Team USA at the 2020 Summer Olympics and won a silver medal.

== College career ==
Munro won back-to-back NCAA Championships with the Florida Gators in 2014 and 2015. During her junior year in 2015, she became one of nine Gators to record a perfect fielding percentage (minimum 50 chances) in a season. She did not made an error in 354 chances behind the plate. During her final two seasons she committed just one error in 874 chances and made only four miscues in 1,423 chances during her career, which tied for second in program history.

== Professional career ==
Following her collegiate career, Munro was drafted 39th overall by USSSA Pride in the 2016 NPF Draft. She signed with the team on July 20, 2016. She was released by USSSA Pride prior to the 2017 season following one season with the team.

== Team USA ==
Munro has been a member of the United States women's national softball team since 2016. At the 2016 World Cup of Softball, she hit .200 (2-for-10) with three RBI and won silver. At the 2016 Women's Softball World Championship, she hit .400 (4-for-10) with one run scored and won gold. At the 2017 World Cup of Softball she hit .143 (1-7) with one RBI and won silver. At the 2018 Women's Softball World Championship, she hit .389 (7-for-18) with three home runs, eight RBI and seven runs scored and won gold. At the 2019 Pan American Games, she hit .143 (2-for-14) with one home run, three RBI and one run scored and won gold. She represented the United States at the 2020 Summer Olympics and won a silver medal. Team USA was defeated by Japan for the gold medal on July 27, 2021, and Munro was shutout at the plate.
