= Timothy Hunt =

Timothy or Tim Hunt may refer to:

- J. Timothy Hunt (born 1959), American-Canadian author and journalist
- Tim Hunt (born 1943), English biochemist
- Tim Hunt (baseball) (1977–2014), American baseball player
- Tim Hunt (singer), American singer
- Tim Hunt (speedway rider) (born 1960), English speedway rider
