= Sofi =

Sofi may refer to:

- Sofi (mascot), the Mascot for 2010 ISF Women's World Championship
- Sofi Marinova (born 1975), Bulgarian singer
- Sophy (Safavid Iran), a term Western literature used to refer to the ruler of Safavid Iran, a corruption of the word "Safavi"— the ruling dynasty

SOFI may refer to:

- Swedish Institute for Language and Folklore
- Spray-On Foam Insulation, used on the Space Shuttle
- Social finance, mobilizing investment capital to drive social progress
- SoFi (Social Finance Inc.), an online personal finance company
- Sofia Toufa (born 1983), also known by her stage name Sofi
- South of Fifth, a neighborhood in Miami Beach, FL, also known as SOFI
- SoFi Stadium, in Los Angeles, California
- Super-resolution optical fluctuation imaging (SOFI), a technique for super-resolution microscopy
- Sofifi, a city in Indonesia
