= 2012 Women's Softball World Championship =

Tournament details
- Host country: Canada
- Dates: 13 July - 22 July
- Defending champions: United States (2010)

The 2012 ISF Women's World Championship is an international softball competition being held at Pepsi Softball Centre in Whitehorse, Yukon, Canada from July 13 to July 22, 2012. It is the 13th edition of the tournament.

== Group stage ==
=== Section A ===
Teams	W	L	Pct.	GB
United States	7	0	1.000	–
China	6	1	.857	1
Netherlands	5	2	.714	2
Puerto Rico	3	4	.429	4
Czech Republic	3	4	.429	4
Venezuela	2	5	.286	5
Argentina	1	6	.143	6
South Africa	1	6	.143	6

=== Section B ===
Teams	W	L	Pct.	GB
Japan	7	0	1.000	–
Canada	6	1	.857	1
Australia	5	2	.714	2
Chinese Taipei	3	4	.429	4
Italy	3	4	.429	4
New Zealand	2	5	.286	5
Great Britain	2	5	.286	5
Mexico	0	7	.000	7

== Playoffs ==
=== Day 1 ===
July 20, 2012	Netherlands	4 – 3	Chinese Taipei

July 20, 2012	Australia	12 – 0 (4)	Puerto Rico

July 20, 2012	United States	4 – 2	Canada

July 20, 2012	Japan	1 – 0	China

=== Day 2 ===
July 21, 2012	Canada	4 – 0	Netherlands

July 21, 2012	Australia	5 – 4 (8)	China

=== Medal round ===
Semifinals
W3	United States	3(8)
W4	Japan	1
W5	Canada	1
W6	Australia	3

Bronze Medal
L7	Japan	2
W8	Australia	0

Gold Medal
W7	United States	1
W9	Japan	2(10)
