= 2005 World Cup of Softball =

Tournament details
- Host country: United States
- City: Oklahoma City, Oklahoma
- Dates: July 14 - July 18
- Teams: 5 (from 3 continents)

Final positions
- Champions: Japan (1st title)
- Runner-up: United States
- Third place: Australia
- Fourth place: China

The first World Cup of Softball was held in Oklahoma City, Oklahoma USA between July 14 and July 18, 2005. Japan won their first World Cup by defeating USA 3–1 in the Championship game.

== Final standings ==
Rank	Team	Wins	Losses	Runs For	Runs Allowed
1	Japan	3	2	11	13
2	United States	3	2	23	9
3	Australia	3	2	17	7
4	China	2	4	14	29
5	Canada	2	3	5	12

== Preliminary round ==
Date	Winner	Score	Loser	Time
July 14, 2005	Canada	2-1	United States	6:00 pm
July 14, 2005	China	5-4	Japan	8:00 pm
July 15, 2005	United States	3-1	Australia	6:00 pm
July 15, 2005	Japan	3-0	Canada	8:00 pm
July 16, 2005	United States	11-3	China	11:00 am
July 16, 2005	Australia	5-0	Canada	1:00 pm
July 16, 2005	Australia	4-2	China	6:00 pm
July 16, 2005	United States	7-0	Japan	8:00 pm
July 17, 2005	Canada	3-2	China	1:00 pm
July 17, 2005	Japan	1-0	Australia	3:00 pm

== Position Round ==
Date	Game	Winner	Score	Loser	Time	Notes
July 18, 2005	Fifth Place Game	China	1-0	Canada	10:00 am	China advances to the third-place game
July 18, 2005	Third-place game	Australia	7-1	China	12:00 pm	
July 18, 2005	First Place Game	Japan	3-1	United States	7:00 pm	Japan's first World Cup championship, USA's first second-place finish

== Teams ==
- United States
- Japan
- Australia
- China
- Canada
