= 2010 Women's Softball World Championship =

Tournament details
- Host country: Venezuela
- Dates: 23 June – 2 July
- Defending champions: United States (2006)

Final positions
- Champions: United States (9th title)
- Runner-up: Japan
- Third place: Canada
- Fourth place: China

Tournament statistics
- Games played: 66

The 2010 ISF Women's World Championship was an international softball competition held at Estadio La Rinconada and Estadio Fuerte Tiuna in Caracas, Venezuela from June 23 to July 2, 2010. It was the 12th edition of the tournament.

In the end, the United States won their ninth and seventh consecutive title.

== Mascot ==
The mascot chosen for this edition is called Sofi, a white cat so cute, beautiful, insightful and courageous, as is the Venezuelan woman. To promote this event as part of the celebration of Venezuelan Bicentennial of Independence. Designed by Fractal Studio, a design studio in Venezuela, the name Sofi is a contraction of Softball International.

== First round ==
=== Pool A ===
Teams	W	L	Pct.	GB	R	RA
Japan	7	0	1.000	–	42	2
Canada	6	1	.857	1	49	5
Chinese Taipei	5	2	.714	2	26	17
Netherlands	4	3	.571	3	23	23
Cuba	3	4	.429	4	19	13
Great Britain	2	5	.286	5	10	27
Argentina	1	6	.143	6	12	45
South Africa	0	7	.000	7	5	54

Qualified for the playoffs

=== Pool B ===
Teams	W	L	Pct.	GB	R	RA
United States	7	0	1.000	–	68	5
Venezuela	6	1	.857	1	30	13
Australia	5	2	.714	2	37	13
China	4	3	.571	3	40	9
Czech Republic	3	4	.429	4	21	41
New Zealand	2	5	.286	5	21	55
Dominican Republic	1	6	.143	6	10	25
Botswana	0	7	.000	7	5	71

== Playoffs ==
=== Day 1 ===
June 30, 2010	Japan	2–0	Venezuela	(Venezuela) Caracas

June 30, 2010	United States	16–1	Canada	(Venezuela) Caracas

June 30, 2010	Chinese Taipei	0–1	China	(Venezuela) Caracas

June 30, 2010	Australia	3–2	Netherlands	(Venezuela) Caracas

=== Day 2 ===
July 1, 2010	Venezuela	1–6	China	(Venezuela) Caracas

July 1, 2010	Canada	3–2	Australia	(Venezuela) Caracas

=== Medal round ===
Day Two
W1	Japan	0
W2	United States	4
W5	China	0
W6	Canada	1

Bronze Medal
L7	Japan	12
W8	Canada	3

Gold Medal
W7	United States	7
W9	Japan	0

== Final standings ==
Rk	Team	W	L
1st place, gold medalist(s)	United States	10	0
2nd place, silver medalist(s)	Japan	9	2
Failed to qualify for the gold medal game
3rd place, bronze medalist(s)	Canada	8	3
4	China	6	4
Failed to qualify for the Medal round
5	Venezuela	6	3
6	Australia	6	3
7	Chinese Taipei	5	3
8	Netherlands	4	4
Failed to qualify for the Playoffs
9	Cuba	3	4
10	Czech Republic	3	4
11	Great Britain	2	5
12	New Zealand	2	5
13	Dominican Republic	1	6
14	Argentina	1	6
15	South Africa	0	7
16	Botswana	0	7

2010 ISF Women's World champions

United States
9th title
