= Tim Hunt (baseball) =

American baseball player (1977–2014)

Timothy Michael Hunt (August 4, 1977 – April 24, 2014) played minor league baseball from 2000 to 2002 and was later a member of the United States men's national softball team.

He was born in Yorba Linda, California. Prior to playing professionally, he attended Fullerton College and Briar Cliff University. He played for the independent Sioux City Explorers in 2000, hitting .188/.304/.271 in 39 games. The next year, he hit .250/.367/.283 with 18 RBI in 57 games for the Duluth–Superior Dukes and in 2002, he hit .218/.371/.218 in 19 games for the Long Beach Breakers.

He participated in the 2007 World Cup of Softball for the U.S. men's national squad. He also played in the 2006 International Softball Congress World Tournament.

He died in San Bernardino County, California at age 39 in an all-terrain vehicle accident.
