= 2006 Japan Softball Cup =

Women's softball tournament

The 2006 Japan Softball Cup is a four-team tournament in women's softball, held in Yokohama, Japan between 17 November and 19 November.

== Results ==
Team	Pts	Pld	W	L	RBI	RBA
United States	6	3	3	0	18	4
Japan	4	3	2	1	16	13
China	2	3	1	2	12	23
Netherlands	0	3	0	3	8	12

November 17, 2006

Japan	4–1	Netherlands
United States	8–0	China
Japan	8–4	China

November 18, 2006

Netherlands	0–2	United States
Japan	4–8	United States
Netherlands	7–8	China

=== Bronze medal match ===
November 19, 2006

Netherlands	0–6	China

=== Gold medal match ===
November 19, 2006

Japan	0–7	United States
