= 2006 Women's Softball World Championship =

Women's Softball World Championship

Tournament details
- Host country: China
- Teams: 16

Final positions
- Champions: United States (8th title)
- Runner-up: Japan
- Third place: Australia
- Fourth place: China

The 2006 ISF Women's World Championship was held from August 27 to September 5, 2006 in Beijing, China. For the sixth consecutive time, the team from the United States won the title, with a 3-0 victory over Japan. The first four teams qualified for the 2008 Olympics. Since China came in fourth, a game for place 5 took place with the winner also qualifying.

== Pool Play ==
=== Group A ===
	GP	W	L	RS	RA
United States	7	7	0	51	1
China	7	6	1	34	3
Canada	7	5	2	29	6
Italy	7	3	4	12	13
New Zealand	7	3	4	8	32
Great Britain	7	3	4	8	26
North Korea	7	1	6	3	17
South Africa	7	0	7	2	49

Italy qualified in fourth with superior runs against New Zealand and Great Britain.

=== Group B ===
	GP	W	L	RS	RA
Japan	7	7	0	48	4
Australia	7	5	2	42	7
Venezuela	7	5	2	39	25
Chinese Taipei	7	4	3	35	21
Greece	7	3	4	30	19
Netherlands	7	3	4	28	34
Botswana	7	1	6	7	70
Colombia	7	0	7	0	49

Colombia withdrew and forfeited all their games.

== Playoffs ==
=== Day One ===
United States	11-1	Australia
Japan	1-0	China
Canada	3-2	Chinese Taipei
Venezuela	1-2	Italy

Chinese Taipei and Venezuela Eliminated.

=== Day Two ===
Canada	2-7	Australia
Italy	1-9	China

Canada and Italy Eliminated.

=== Day Three ===
Canada	3-0	Italy

Canada places 5th and earns spot in 2008 Olympics

=== Medal Round ===
Day Two
A1	United States	1
B1	Japan	3
A2	China	0
B2	Australia	1

Bronze Medal
A1	United States	5
A2	Australia	1

Gold Medal
B1	Japan	0
A1	United States	3

== Final ranking ==
(gold) United States

(silver) Japan

(bronze) Australia

4. China

5. Canada

6. Italy

7. Venezuela

8. Chinese Taipei

9. Greece

10. Great Britain

11. New Zealand

12. Netherlands

13. North Korea

14. Botswana

15. South Africa

16. Colombia
