= 1990 Women's Softball World Championship =

Women's Softball World Championship

Tournament details
- Host country: United States
- Teams: 20

Final positions
- Champions: United States (4th title)
- Runner-up: New Zealand
- Third place: China
- Fourth place: Australia

The 1990 ISF Women's World Championship for softball was held July 13–21, 1990 in Normal, Illinois, United States. The host United States won their second straight title after the event's final was rained out. The U.S. was given the title due to a superior ranking than the other finalist, New Zealand, in pool play.

== Pool play ==
Team	GP	W	L
United States	9	9	0
New Zealand	9	8	1
China	9	8	1
Australia	9	8	1
Chinese Taipei	9	6	3
Japan	9	6	3
Canada	9	6	3
Italy	9	6	3
Netherlands	9	5	4
Cuba	9	5	4
Puerto Rico	9	5	4
Philippines	9	4	5
Bahamas	9	4	5
Netherlands Antilles	9	4	5
Mexico	9	2	7
Aruba	9	2	7
Bermuda	9	1	8
Indonesia	9	1	8
Argentina	9	0	9
Zimbabwe	9	0	9

== Medal round ==
Day Two
1	United States	6
2	New Zealand	1
3	China	1
4	Australia	0

Bronze Medal
2	New Zealand	1
3	China	0

Gold Medal
1	United States
2	New Zealand

The gold medal game was rained out. The United States was awarded the gold medal for a superior round robin record.
