= 1982 Women's Softball World Championship =

Women's Softball World Championship

Tournament details
- Host country: Taiwan
- Teams: 22
- Defending champions: United States (1978)

Final positions
- Champions: New Zealand (1st title)
- Runner-up: Chinese Taipei
- Third place: Australia
- Fourth place: United States

The 1982 ISF Women's World Championship for softball was held 3 to 11 July 1982 in Taipei, Taiwan. A record 22 national teams participated. The tournament experienced several game postponements due to rain.

New Zealand won their first ever title. The defeat host Chinese Taipei 2–0 in the grand final.

== China's participation ==
All 45 members of the International Softball Federation (ISF) at the time were sent invitations.

The People's Republic of China which had never competed in Taiwanese soil since the end of the Chinese Civil War have originally committed to send a team despite its non-recognition of Taiwan as a country. However China withdrew from the tournament over the controversy of Taiwan's potential usage of its flag and anthem in the games. China has insisted on the One China policy. Japan which proposed moving the tournament elsewhere also boycotted.

Taiwan reserved the right to use the Nationalist Flag. However officially the flag was barred from being used inside the competition venue.

== Final round ==
Final
11 July
New Zealand	2
Chinese Taipei	0

== Final standings ==
Rank	Team
1st place, gold medalist(s)	New Zealand
2nd place, silver medalist(s)	Chinese Taipei
3rd place, bronze medalist(s)	Australia
4	United States
5	Philippines
6	El Salvador
7	Netherlands
8	Canada
9	Venezuela
10	Guatemala
11	Bermuda
12	Bahamas
13	Belgium
14	Nicaragua
15	Panama
16	Dominican Republic
17	Singapore
18	Guam
19	Indonesia
20	Malaysia
21	Sweden
22	Nauru
–	Colombia (Note: Colombia is among the entrant teams but is not part of the final standing)

Source: WBSC

== See also ==
- List of sporting events in Taiwan
