= 2011 World Cup of Softball =

Tournament details
- Host country: United States
- City: Oklahoma City, Oklahoma
- Dates: July 21 - July 25
- Teams: 6 (from 4 continents)
- Defending champions: United States (2010)

Final positions
- Champions: United States (5th title)
- Runner-up: Japan
- Third place: Canada
- Fourth place: Australia

The sixth World Cup of Softball was held in Oklahoma City, Oklahoma USA between July 21 and July 25, 2011. USA won their fifth World Cup by defeating Japan 6–4 in the Championship game.

== Current standings ==
Rank	Team	Wins	Losses	Runs For	Runs Allowed
1	United States	5	1	39	16
2	Japan	4	2	42	26
3	Canada	4	2	30	25
4	Australia	3	3	29	16
5	Great Britain	2	4	20	39
6	Czech Republic	0	6	5	43

== Preliminary round ==
all times CDT

Date	Winner	Score	Loser	Time
July 21, 2011	Australia	11–0 (5 innings)	Czech Republic	10:00 am
July 21, 2011	Japan	9–6 (8 innings)	Canada	12:30 pm
July 21, 2011	Australia	7–1	Great Britain	3:00 pm
July 21, 2011	United States	7–2	Czech Republic	7:00 pm
July 22, 2011	Canada	6–4	Great Britain	10:00 am
July 22, 2011	Japan	3–0 (8 innings)	Australia	12:30 pm
July 22, 2011	Canada	7–0 (5 innings)	Czech Republic	3:00 pm
July 22, 2011	United States	5–2	Australia	7:00 pm
July 23, 2011	Great Britain	3–2	Czech Republic	9:00 am
July 23, 2011	Canada	4–3	United States	12:00 pm
July 23, 2011	United States	8–4	Japan	8:00 pm
July 24, 2011	Japan	13–6	Great Britain	10:00 am
July 24, 2011	Japan	9–0 (5 innings)	Czech Republic	12:30 pm
July 24, 2011	United States	10–0 (4 innings)	Great Britain	4:00 pm
July 24, 2011	Australia	8–3	Canada	6:30 pm

== Position Round ==
all times CDT

Date	Game	Winner	Score	Loser	Time
July 25, 2011	Fifth Place Game	Great Britain	6–1	Czech Republic	1:00 pm
July 25, 2011	Third-place game	Canada	4–1	Australia	4:00 pm
July 25, 2011	First Place Game	United States	6–4	Japan	8:00 pm

== Teams ==
- Australia
- Canada
- Czech Republic
- Great Britain
- Japan
- United States
