= 2010 World Cup of Softball =

Tournament details
- Host country: United States
- City: Oklahoma City, Oklahoma
- Dates: July 22 - July 26
- Teams: 4 (from 2 continents)
- Defending champions: United States (2009)

Final positions
- Champions: United States (4th title)
- Runner-up: Japan
- Third place: United States Futures
- Fourth place: Canada

The fifth World Cup of Softball was held in Oklahoma City, Oklahoma USA between July 22 and July 26, 2010. USA won their fourth World Cup by defeating Japan 5-1 in the Championship game.

== Final standings ==
Rank	Team	Wins	Losses	Runs For	Runs Allowed
1	United States	6	1	33	6
2	Japan	3	4	10	22
3	United States Futures	3	4	22	20
4	Canada	2	5	17	34

== Preliminary round ==
Date	Winner	Score	Loser	Time
July 22, 2010	United States	9-0	Canada	7:00 pm
July 22, 2010	Japan	3-2	United States Futures	9:00 pm
July 23, 2010	United States Futures	5-4	Canada	3:00 pm
July 23, 2010	United States	5-0	Japan	7:00 pm
July 23, 2010	Japan	1-0	Canada	9:00 pm
July 24, 2010	United States	1-0	United States Futures	11:00 am
July 24, 2010	United States	8-0	Japan	7:00 pm
July 24, 2010	Canada	5-4	United States Futures	9:00 pm
July 25, 2010	United States Futures	2-1	Japan	12:00 pm
July 25, 2010	Canada	5-2	United States	4:00 pm
July 25, 2010	Japan	4-0	Canada	7:00 pm
July 26, 2010	United States	3-0	United States Futures	1:00 pm

== Position Round ==
Date	Game	Winner	Score	Loser	Time	Notes
July 26, 2010	Third-place game	United States Futures	9-3	Canada	4:00 pm	
July 26, 2010	First Place Game	United States	5-1	Japan	8:00 pm	USA's fourth World Cup championship, Japan's third second-place finish

== Teams ==
- United States
- United States Futures
- Canada
- Japan
