= 2009 World Cup of Softball =

Tournament details
- Host country: United States
- City: Oklahoma City, Oklahoma
- Dates: July 16 - July 20
- Teams: 6 (from 4 continents)
- Defending champions: United States (2007)

Final positions
- Champions: United States (3rd title)
- Runner-up: Australia
- Third place: Canada
- Fourth place: Japan

The fourth World Cup of Softball was held in Oklahoma City, Oklahoma between July 16 and July 20, 2009. The United States won their third World Cup by defeating Australia 3-1 in the Championship game.

== Final standings ==
Rank	Team	Wins	Losses	Runs For	Runs Allowed
1	United States	6	0	50	4
2	Australia	3	3	22	25
3	Canada	4	2	26	28
4	Japan	3	3	20	20
5	Netherlands	2	4	20	29
6	Italy	0	6	7	47

== Position Round ==
Date	Game	Winner	Score	Loser	Notes
July 20	First Place Game	United States	3-1	Australia	USA's third World Cup championship
July 20	Third Place Game	Canada	4-1	Japan	Canada's third third-place finish
July 20	Fifth Place Game	Netherlands	8-1	Italy	
