= 2013 World Cup of Softball =

2013 World Cup of Softball VIII
Tournament details
- Host country: United States
- City: Oklahoma City, Oklahoma
- Dates: July 11–14
- Teams: 5 (from 3 continents)
- Venues: ASA Hall of Fame Stadium
- Defending champions: United States (2012)

Final positions
- Champions: Japan (2nd title)
- Runner-up: United States
- Third place: Australia
- Fourth place: Canada

The eighth World Cup of Softball will be held between July 11–14 in Oklahoma City, Oklahoma USA. The competing national teams will be the United States, Puerto Rico, Japan, Australia, Canada.

== Standings ==
Rank	Team	Wins	Losses	Runs For	Runs Allowed
1	United States	3	1	25	10
2	Japan	3	1	15	8
3	Canada	3	1	17	11
4	Australia	1	3	8	11
5	Puerto Rico	0	4	8	33

== Schedule ==
all times CDT

Date	Winner	Score	Loser	Time	Stats
July 11, 2013	Japan	3-2	Australia	4:30 pm	Boxscore
July 11, 2013	United States	7-0	Canada	7:00 pm	Boxscore
July 12, 2013	Canada	13-3	Puerto Rico	11:30 am	Boxscore
July 12, 2013	Canada	2-1	Japan	2:00 am	Boxscore
July 12, 2013	United States	4-0	Australia	7:00 pm	Boxscore
July 13, 2013	Japan	4-0	Puerto Rico	10:00 am	Boxscore
July 13, 2013	Australia	6-2	Puerto Rico	12:30 pm	Boxscore
July 13, 2013	Canada	2-0	Australia	3:00 pm	Boxscore
July 13, 2013	Japan	7-4	United States	8:00 pm	Boxscore
July 14, 2013	United States	10-3	Puerto Rico	12:00 pm	Boxscore

== Championship ==
all times CDT
The fourth and fifth-place finishers will play, the loser finishes in fifth, the winner plays for third place against the third-place finisher. The top two finishers play for the championship. The fourth-place finisher advanced directly to the third place game due to rain.

Date	Game	Winner	Score	Loser	Time	Stats
July 14, 2013	Fifth Place Game	Puerto Rico	0-0	Puerto Rico	2:30 pm	
July 14, 2013	Third Place Game	Canada	3-4	Australia	5:00 pm	Boxscore
July 14, 2013	Championship Game	Japan	6-3	United States	8:00 pm	Boxscore
