= Sofi (mascot) =

Sofi was the official mascot of the 2010 ISF Women's World Championship in Caracas, Venezuela. She is called Sofi, an acronym for SOFtball International. It was designed by Fractal Studio, a design studio in Venezuela and was filed on May 20, 2010.

== Personality ==
She is a portrayed as bold cat, being both spontaneous and clever. She is usually demonstrated as being very sociable, as well as loving and kind.

== See also ==
- Mascot
