= 2012 World Cup of Softball =

2012 World Cup of Softball VII

Tournament details
- Host country: United States
- City: Oklahoma City, Oklahoma
- Dates: June 27 - July 2
- Teams: 6 (from 4 continents)
- Venues: ASA Hall of Fame Stadium
- Defending champions: United States (2011)

Final positions
- Champions: United States (6th title)
- Runner-up: Australia
- Third place: Canada
- Fourth place: Netherlands

The seventh World Cup of Softball was held in Oklahoma City, Oklahoma, United States, between June 27 and July 2, 2012. The competing national teams were the United States, Puerto Rico, Brazil, Canada, Netherlands and Australia. Some games were televised on the ESPN family of channels, and they were all broadcast online on ESPN3.

== Current standings ==
Rank	Team	Wins	Losses	Runs For	Runs Allowed
1	United States	6	0	34	2
2	Australia	4	2	29	15
3	Canada	3	3	43	31
4	Netherlands	3	3	27	28
5	Puerto Rico	1	5	9	31
6	Brazil	1	5	7	34

== Preliminary round ==
all times CDT

Date	Winner	Score	Loser	Time
June 28, 2012	Brazil	2-1	Puerto Rico	9:00 am
June 28, 2012	Netherlands	7-6	Canada	11:30 am
June 28, 2012	Australia	11-1	Brazil	2:00 pm
June 28, 2012	United States	8-0	Puerto Rico	6:00 pm
June 29, 2012	Netherlands	4-3	Brazil	9:00 am
June 29, 2012	Australia	7-6	Canada	11:30 am
June 29, 2012	Netherlands	7-2	Puerto Rico	2:00 pm
June 29, 2012	United States	3-1	Australia	6:00 pm
June 30, 2012	United States	2-1	Netherlands	12:00 pm
June 30, 2012	United States	9-0 (5 Innings)	Canada	5:00 pm
June 30, 2012	Australia	6-2	Puerto Rico	8:00 pm
July 1, 2012	United States	9-0	Brazil	12:00 pm
July 1, 2012	Australia	4-0	Netherlands	2:30 pm
July 1, 2012	Canada	7-0	Puerto Rico	5:00 pm
July 1, 2012	Canada	13-0	Brazil	7:30 pm

== Position Round ==
all times CDT

Date	Game	Winner	Score	Loser	Time
July 2, 2012	Fifth Place Game	Puerto Rico	4-1	Brazil	1:00 pm
July 2, 2012	Third-place game	Canada	11-8	Netherlands	4:00 pm
July 2, 2012	Championship Game	United States	3-0	Australia	8:00 pm
