= Dominican Republic women's national softball team =

Medal record

Softball

Pan American Games
| Bronze medal – third place | 2003 Santo Domingo | |

Central American and Caribbean Games
| Bronze medal – third place | 2026 Santo Domingo | |

The Dominican Republic women's national softball team is the national softball team of Dominican Republic. It is governed by Dominican Republic Softball Federation and takes part in international softball competitions.

The team competed at the 2002 ISF Women's World Championship in Saskatoon, Saskatchewan where they finished sixteenth. The team competed at the 2010 ISF Women's World Championship in Caracas, Venezuela where they finished thirteenth.

The team won the bronze medal at the softball tournament of the 2003 Pan American Games. The Dominican team won the gold medal at the softball tournament of the 2013 Bolivarian Games.

== Results ==
- ISF Women's World Championship
  - 2002 - 16th
  - 2010 - 13th
- Pan American Games
  - 2003 - Bronze Medal
- Bolivarian Games
  - 2013 - Gold Medal
