= 1965 Women's Softball World Championship =

Women's Softball World Championship

Tournament details
- Host country: Australia
- Teams: 5 (from 2 continents)
- Defending champions: Australia (1965)

Final positions
- Champions: Australia (1st title)
- Runner-up: United States
- Third place: Japan
- Fourth place: New Zealand

The 1965 ISF Women's World Championship for softball was the first edition of the Women's Softball World Championship. It was held in Melbourne, Australia.

== Final round ==
Final
Australia	1
United States	0
Bronze medal game
Japan	3
New Zealand	2

== Final standings ==
Rank	Team
1st place, gold medalist(s)	Australia
2nd place, silver medalist(s)	United States
3rd place, bronze medalist(s)	Japan
4	New Zealand
5	New Guinea

Source: WBSC
