= Cuba women's national softball team =

Information
- Country: Cuba
- Confederation: WBSC Americas
- WBSC World Rank: 17 ▼5 (31 December 2024)

Olympic Games
- Appearances: 1 (First in 2000)
- Best result: 7th

Women's Softball World Cup
- Appearances: 5 (First in 1990)
- Best result: 9th

Cuba women's national softball team represents Cuba in international softball competitions.

The team competed at the 1990 ISF Women's World Championship in Normal, Illinois where they finished with 5 wins and 4 losses. The team competed at the 1994 ISF Women's World Championship in St. John's, Newfoundland where they finished tenth. The team competed at the 2010 ISF Women's World Championship in Caracas, Venezuela where they finished ninth.

== See also ==
- Cuba men's national softball team
