= Bermuda women's national softball team =

Bermuda women's national softball team is the national team for Bermuda. The team competed at the 1990 ISF Women's World Championship in Normal, Illinois where they finished with 1 win and 8 losses. The team competed at the 1994 ISF Women's World Championship in St. John's, Newfoundland where they finished twenty-fourth.
