= Netherlands Antilles women's national softball team =

Netherlands Antilles women's national softball team is the national team for the Netherlands Antilles. The team competed at the 1990 ISF Women's World Championship in Normal, Illinois where they finished with 4 wins and 5 losses. The team competed at the 1994 ISF Women's World Championship in St. John's, Newfoundland where they finished twelfth. The team competed at the 1998 ISF Women's World Championship in Fujinomiya City, Japan where they finished tenth. The team competed at the 2002 ISF Women's World Championship in Saskatoon, Saskatchewan where they finished twelfth.
