= Venezuela women's national softball team =

Information
- Country: Venezuela
- Federation: Venezuelan Softball Federation
- Confederation: WBSC Americas
- WBSC World Rank: 16 ▼1 (31 December 2025)

Olympic Games
- Appearances: 1 (First in 2008)
- Best result: 7th

Women's Softball World Cup
- Appearances: 10 (First in 1974)
- Best result: 5th

Venezuela women's national softball team is the national team for Venezuela in international softball competitions. It is a regular competitor at the Women's Softball World Cup since 1974, and also qualified at the 2008 Summer Olympics and the 2013 World Games.

== Results ==
Summer Olympics

- 2008 : 7th

World Games

- 2013: 2nd

Women's Softball World Cup

- 1965 - Melbourne: Did not qualify
- 1970 - Osaka: Did not qualify
- 1974 - Stratford: 15th
- 1978 - San Salvador: Did not qualify
- 1982 - Taipei: 9th
- 1986 - Auckland: Did not qualify
- 1990 - Normal: Did not qualify
- 1994 - St. John's: Did not qualify
- 1998 - Fujinomiya City: 8th
- 2002 - Saskatoon: 10th.
- 2006 - Beijing: 7th
- 2010 - Caracas: 5th
- 2012 - Whitehorse: 11th
- 2014 - Haarlem: Did not qualify
- 2016 - Surrey: 6th
- 2018 - Chiba: 12th
- 2022 - Birmingham: Did not qualify
- 2024 - Italy: 9th
- 2027 - Redcliffe: Qualified

Pan American Games

- 1979: Did not qualify
- 1983: 5th
- 1987: 4th
- 1991: 5th
- 1995: Did not qualify
- 1999: Did not qualify
- 2003: 5th
- 2007: 3rd
- 2011: 4th
- 2015: Did not qualify
- 2019: 5th

Women's Softball Pan American Championship

- 2001: 4th
- 2005: 3rd
- 2009: 3rd
- 2013: First round
- 2017: 4th
- 2022: Second round
- 2025: 5th
