= Czech Republic women's national softball team =

Information
- Country: Czech Republic
- Federation: Czech Softball Association
- Confederation: WBSC Europe
- Manager: Mike Renney
- WBSC World Rank: 10 ▲1 (31 December 2025)

The Czech Republic women's national softball team is the national softball team for Czech Republic. The team competed at the 1994 ISF Women's World Championship in St. John's, Newfoundland where they finished nineteenth. The team competed at the 1998 ISF Women's World Championship in Fujinomiya City, Japan where they finished twelfth. The team competed at the 2002 ISF Women's World Championship in Saskatoon, Saskatchewan where they finished fifteenth. The team competed at the 2010 ISF Women's World Championship in Caracas, Venezuela where they finished tenth.
