= Mexico women's national softball team =

Information
- Country: Mexico
- Federation: Mexican Softball Federation
- Confederation: WBSC Americas
- Manager: Carlos Bernáldez
- WBSC World Rank: 7 ▲1 (31 December 2025)

Olympic Games
- Appearances: 1 (First in 2020)
- Best result: 4th (2020)

Women's Softball World Cup
- Appearances: 8 (First in 1970)
- Best result: 5th (1970, 2016)

Mexico women's national softball team is the national team for Mexico. The team competed at the 1990 ISF Women's World Championship in Normal, Illinois where they finished with 2 wins and 7 losses.

The country's softball team finished fourth with a 3–2 loss to Canada in the bronze-medal game at The Tokyo Olympics. The games were Mexico's first foray into Olympic softball.
