= China women's national softball team =

Information
- Country: China
- Federation: Chinese Softball Association
- Confederation: Softball Confederation of Asia
- WBSC World Rank: 8 ▼1 (31 December 2025)

Olympic Games
- Appearances: 4 (First in 1996)
- Best result: (silver) 2nd (1 time, in 1996)

Women's Softball World Cup
- Appearances: ?
- Best result: (silver) 2nd (2 times, most recent in 1994)

Asian Games
- Appearances: 7 (First in 1990)
- Best result: (gold) 1st (3 times, most recent in 1998)

Asian Championship
- Appearances: ?
- Best result: (gold) 1st (3 times, most recent in 1995)

The China women's national softball team is the national team of the People's Republic of China. It is governed by the Chinese Softball Association and takes part in international softball competitions.

The team competed at the 1990 ISF Women's World Championship in Normal, Illinois where they finished with 8 wins and 1 loss. The team competed at the 1994 ISF Women's World Championship in St. John's, Newfoundland where they finished second. The team competed at the 1998 ISF Women's World Championship in Fujinomiya City, Japan where they finished fourth. The team competed at the 2002 ISF Women's World Championship in Saskatoon, Saskatchewan where they finished fourth. The team competed at the 2006 ISF Women's World Championship in Beijing, China where they finished fourth. The team competed at the 2010 ISF Women's World Championship in Caracas, Venezuela where they finished fourth.

== Results ==
- ISF Women's World Championship: Silver Medal - 1986, 1994; Bronze Medal - 1990
- 2006 Japan Softball Cup: 3rd
- World Cup of Softball: 4th (2007), 5th (2006)
