= Softball at the 2020 Summer Olympics – Team squads =

List of softball rosters

Below are the team rosters for the softball competition at the 2020 Summer Olympics. Each team consists of 15 players.

== Rosters ==
=== Australia ===
The roster was released on 1 July 2021.

Softball at the 2020 Summer Olympics – Australia roster
Players		Coaches
Pitchers: 6 Ellen Roberts; 14 Tarni Stepto; 32 Kaia Parnaby; 54 Gabrielle Plain	Catchers: 22 Belinda White; 25 Chelsea Forkin; 65 Taylah Tsitsikronis; Infielders: 2 Clare Warwick; 4 Stacey McManus; 16 Stacey Porter; 31 Rachel Lack; 44 Leah Parry; Outfielders: 1 Jade Wall; 17 Leigh Godfrey; 47 Michelle Cox	Manager: Laing Harrow; Coaches: Nathan Jones; Andrew Kirkpatrick

=== Canada ===
The Canadian roster of 15 athletes was named on 12 May 2021, including four members of the last team that competed at the Olympics (Lawrie, Rafter, Regula and Sailing).

Softball at the 2020 Summer Olympics – Canada roster
Players		Coaches
Pitchers: 15 Danielle Lawrie; 17 Sara Groenewegen; 29 Jenna Caira; 38 Lauren Bay-Regula	Catchers: 2 Natalie Wideman; 55 Kaleigh Rafter; Infielders: 1 Kelsey Harshman; 5 Joey Lye; 7 Jennifer Salling; 14 Janet Leung; 19 Emma Entzminger; Outfielders: 3 Erika Polidori; 8 Victoria Hayward; 25 Jennifer Gilbert; 26 Larissa Franklin	Manager: 0 Mark Smith; Coaches: Lonni Alameda; Mel Basilio; Chris Jones

=== Italy ===
The roster was released on 4 July 2021.

Softball at the 2020 Summer Olympics – Italy roster
Players		Coaches
Pitchers: 5 Alexia Lacatena; 7 Ilaria Cacciamani; 18 Greta Cecchetti	Catchers: 15 Elisa Cecchetti; 19 Marta Gasparotto; 20 Erika Piancastelli; Infielders: 8 Andrea Filler; 12 Amanda Fama; 14 Giulia Longhi; 22 Andrea Howard; 26 Emily Carosone; 27 Giulia Koutsoyanopulos; Outfielders: 4 Fabrizia Marrone; 21 Laura Vigna; 23 Beatrice Ricchi	Manager: 0 Federico Pizzolini; Coaches: Julio La Rosa Zequeira; Giovanna Palermi

=== Japan ===
The roster was released on 23 March 2021.

Softball at the 2020 Summer Olympics – Japan roster
Players		Coaches
Pitchers: 16 Yamato Fujita; 17 Yukiko Ueno; 27 Miu Goto	Catchers: 1 Yukiyo Mine; 21 Nayu Kiyohara; 25 Haruka Agatsuma; Infielders: 4 Yuka Ichiguchi; 5 Yu Yamamoto; 10 Hitomi Kawabata; 12 Mana Atsumi; 14 Minori Naito; Outfielders: 2 Saki Yamazaki; 8 Nodoka Harada; 9 Sayaka Mori; 11 Eri Yamada	Manager: 0 Reika Utsugi; Coaches: Noriko Yamaji

=== Mexico ===
The women's national softball roster of Mexico was released on July 5, 2021.

Softball at the 2020 Summer Olympics – Mexico roster
Players		Coaches
Pitchers: 3 Danielle O'Toole; 12 Dallas Escobedo; 18 Taylor McQuillin; 89 Sierra Hyland	Catchers: 13 Sashel Palacios; 22 Brittany Cervantes; Infielders: 2 Sydney Romero; 8 Tori Vidales; 11 Chelsea Gonzales; 17 Anissa Urtez; 20 Amanda Sánchez; Outfielders: 5 Suzy Brookshire; 10 Nicole Mendes; 16 Tatyana Forbes; 23 Stefanía Aradillas	Manager: 0 Carlos Bernáldez; Coaches: Carlos Caro; Rolando Guerrero

=== United States ===
The United States roster was released on June 20, 2021.

Softball at the 2020 Summer Olympics – United States roster
Players		Coaches
Pitchers: 14 Monica Abbott; 21 Rachel Garcia; 38 Cat Osterman	Catchers: 1 Aubree Munro; 4 Amanda Chidester; 34 Dejah Mulipola; Infielders: 2 Ali Aguilar; 3 Ally Carda; 7 Kelsey Stewart; 20 Valerie Arioto; 99 Delaney Spaulding; Outfielders: 8 Haylie McCleney; 9 Janie Reed; 16 Michelle Moultrie; 48 Bubba Nickles	Manager: 0 Ken Eriksen; Coaches: Laura Berg
