= Softball at the 2022 World Games – Squads =

Below are the team rosters for the softball competition at the 2022 World Games.

== Rosters ==
=== Australia ===
The roster was released on May 10, 2022.

- Michelle Cox
- Georgia Hood
- Shannon Keevers
- Olivia Kuzminski
- Kandra Lamb
- Chantelle Ladner
- Stacey McManus
- Ellen Roberts
- Steph Trzcisnki
- Taylah Tsitsikronis
- Jade Wall
- Clare Warwick
- Belinda White
- Tameika Whitefield
- Sasha Willems

=== Canada ===
The roster was released on June 21, 2022.

- Ruby Anderson
- Dawn Bodrug
- Emma Entzminger
- Alysen Febrey
- Larissa Franklin
- Kelsey Harshman
- Victoria Hayward
- Kianna Jones
- Kelsey Lalor
- Janet Leung
- Grace Messmer
- Erika Polidori
- Morgan Rackel
- Nicola Simpson
- Natalie Wideman

=== Chinese Taipei ===
The roster was released on June 16, 2022.

- Chiang Hui-chuan
- Shen Xiao-Lin
- Chiu An-Ju
- Yang Yi-Ting
- Li Szu-Shih
- Lin Feng-Chen
- Shen Chia-Wen
- Chen Chia-Yi
- Shih Chia-Ching
- Lin Chih-Ying
- Tsai Chia-Chen
- Liu Huan
- Tan Ya-ting
- Weng Tzu-Ching
- Chen Yu-Ting
- Ko Chia-Hui
- Chang Chia-Yun
- Chen Ching-Yu
- Chih I-Ting
- Chiang Ting-En
- Ke Hsia-Ai
- Ho Yi-Fan

=== Italy ===
The roster was released on February 15, 2022.

- Laura Bigatton
- Ilaria Cacciamani
- Elisa Cecchetti
- Irene Costa
- Sofia Fabbian
- Amanda Fama
- Andrea Filler
- Agnese Giacometti
- Noemi Giacometti
- Giulia Longhi
- Fabrizia Marrone
- Alessia Melegari
- Alice Nicolini
- Carlotta Salis
- Melany Sheldon
- Elena Slawitz
- Silvia Torre

=== Japan ===
The roster was released on June 21, 2022.

- Haruka Agatsuma
- Urara Fujimoto
- Yamato Fujita
- Miu Goto
- Nodoka Harada
- Yuka Ichiguchi
- Kyoko Ishikawa
- Misaki Katsumata
- Hitomi Kawabata
- Yume Kiriishi
- Kanna Kudo
- Sakura Miwa
- Minori Naito
- Ayane Nakagawa
- Yui Sakamoto

=== Mexico ===
The roster was released on June 21, 2022.

- Stefanía Aradillas
- Diana Arcega
- Alex Casas
- Saleen Donohoe
- Marlene Espinoza
- Kiana Estrada
- Desiree Denise Hernandez
- Sierra Hyland
- Raci Cian Miranda Weeks
- Valeria Pero
- Ximena Piri
- Gloria Ponce
- Madelyn Ruffin
- Yanina Treviño
- Savannah Wysocki

=== Puerto Rico ===
The roster was released on June 21, 2022.

- Karla Claudio
- Esperanza Coe
- Jenna Cozza
- Xeana Dung
- Kathyria Garcia
- Carsyn Gordon
- Jaimie Hoover
- Janelle Martinez
- Aleshia Ocasio
- Camille Nahir Ortiz Martinez
- Shasl Yanne Ortiz Sterling
- Alyssa Rivera
- Daniele Nicole Rivera
- Tatianna Roman
- Geana Jene Torres

=== United States ===
The roster was released on January 7, 2022.

- Monica Abbott
- Ally Carda
- Charla Echols
- Megan Faraimo
- Hannah Flippen
- Jailyn Ford
- Montana Fouts
- Kinzie Hansen
- Janae Jefferson
- Amanda Lorenz
- Haylie McCleney
- Michelle Moultrie
- Dejah Mulipola
- Bubba Nickles
- Taylor Pleasants
- Sami Reynolds
- Gwen Svekis
