= Softball at the 2020 Summer Olympics =

Softball at the Games of the XXXII Olympiad
- Softball pictogram for the 2020 Summer Olympics
- Venue: Yokohama Stadium; Fukushima Azuma Baseball Stadium
- Dates: 21–27 July 2021
- No. of events: 1
- Competitors: 90 from 6 nations

Medalists
1st place, gold medalist(s)		Japan
2nd place, silver medalist(s)		United States
3rd place, bronze medalist(s)		Canada

Softball was featured at the 2020 Summer Olympics in Tokyo in its first Olympic appearance since 2008. The tournament consisted of six teams. Baseball/softball was one of five optional sports added to the program of the 2020 Summer Olympics. The first six opening round games were played at Fukushima Azuma Baseball Stadium in an effort to highlight Fukushima's recovery from the 2011 Fukushima Daiichi nuclear disaster, while the remaining games were played at Yokohama Stadium. Softball did not return in 2024.

It was originally scheduled to be held in 2020, but on 24 March 2020, the Olympics were postponed to 2021 due to the COVID-19 pandemic. Because of this pandemic, the games were played behind closed doors. The opening match of the event between Australia and Japan meant that for the first time since 1996, the opening match of the summer Olympiad was not a football match.

The medals for the competition were presented by Yasuhiro Yamashita, IOC Member, and Olympic Champion from Japan, and the medalists' bouquets were presented by Beng Choo Low, WBSC Secretary General; Malaysia.

== Competition format ==
The softball tournament featured a single round-robin of the six teams in which each team played one game against each other. The top two teams advanced to a gold medal game, while the third and fourth-placed teams qualified for the bronze medal game. Rankings in the round-robin stage were determined by win/loss percentage, with additional tie-breakers on head-to-head record and goal differential, although these were not ultimately necessary.

== Qualification ==
Six teams qualified, including Japan, which, as host nation, qualifies automatically. The United States team won the 2018 Women's Softball World Championship to qualify for the Olympics as world champions. The remaining four spots were allocated through three qualification tournaments: one spot for a Europe/Africa tournament, one spot for an Asia/Oceania tournament, and two spots for an Americas tournament. Italy, Mexico, Canada, and Australia qualified by winning those tournaments.

Event	Date	Location	Quotas	Qualified
Host nation	—N/a	—N/a	1	Japan
2018 Women's Softball World Championship	2–12 August 2018	(Japan) Chiba	1	United States
Africa/Europe Qualifying Event	23–27 July 2019	(Netherlands) Utrecht	1	Italy
Americas Qualifying Event	25 August – 1 September 2019	(Canada) Surrey	2	Mexico; Canada
Asia/Oceania Qualifying Event	24–29 September 2019	(China) Shanghai	1	Australia
Total			6	

== Competition schedule ==
Legend

GS	Group stage	B	Bronze medal match	F	Gold medal match

Wed 21	Thu 22	Fri 23	Sat 24	Sun 25	Mon 26	Tue 27	
GS			GS			B	F

== Team squads ==
A total of six countries entered softball teams of 15 athletes each.

- Australia (15)
- Canada (15)
- Italy (15)
- Japan (15)
- Mexico (15)
- United States (15)

== Medalists ==
Event	Gold	Silver	Bronze
Women's tournament	Japan; Haruka Agatsuma; Mana Atsumi; Yamato Fujita; Miu Goto; Nodoka Harada; Yuka Ichiguchi; Hitomi Kawabata; Nayu Kiyohara; Yukiyo Mine; Sayaka Mori; Minori Naito; Yukiko Ueno; Saki Yamazaki; Eri Yamada; Yu Yamamoto	United States; Ali Aguilar; Monica Abbott; Valerie Arioto; Ally Carda; Amanda Chidester; Rachel Garcia; Haylie McCleney; Michelle Moultrie; Dejah Mulipola; Aubree Munro; Bubba Nickles; Cat Osterman; Janie Reed; Delaney Spaulding; Kelsey Stewart	Canada; Jenna Caira; Emma Entzminger; Larissa Franklin; Jennifer Gilbert; Sara Groenewegen; Kelsey Harshman; Victoria Hayward; Danielle Lawrie; Janet Leung; Joey Lye; Erika Polidori; Kaleigh Rafter; Lauren Bay-Regula; Jennifer Salling; Natalie Wideman

== Group stage ==
The top two teams advanced to the gold medal match. The third and fourth-placed teams advanced to the bronze medal match.

=== Standings ===
Pos	Team	Pld	W	L	RF	RA	RD	PCT	GB	Qualification
1	United States	5	5	0	9	2	+7	1.000	—	Gold medal match
2	Japan (H)	5	4	1	18	5	+13	.800	1	Gold medal match
3	Canada	5	3	2	19	4	+15	.600	2	Bronze medal match
4	Mexico	5	2	3	11	10	+1	.400	3	Bronze medal match
5	Australia	5	1	4	5	21	−16	.200	4	
6	Italy	5	0	5	1	21	−20	.000	5	

Source: Tokyo 2020 and WBSC
(H) Hosts

=== 21 July ===
21 July 08:55 (JST) Fukushima Azuma Baseball Stadium 31 °C (88 °F)
Team	1	2	3	4	5	6	7	R	H	E
Australia	1	0	0	0	0	X	X	1	2	2
Japan (5)	1	0	2	3	2	X	X	8	6	0
WP: Yukiko Ueno (1–0) LP: Kaia Parnaby (0–1); Home runs: AUS: None; JPN: Minori Naito (1), Yamato Fujita (1), Yu Yamamoto (1); Boxscore

Australia faced host nation and defending 2008 champion Japan in the first event of the 2020 Summer Olympics. Yukiko Ueno started for Japan and allowed a leadoff single to Michelle Cox. After a flyout, Ueno walked a batter and hit another, loading the bases. Taylah Tsitsikronis was hit by a pitch, scoring Cox and giving Australia a 1–0 lead. Kaia Parnaby started for Australia. In the bottom of the first, Yu Yamamoto tied the game for Japan on a two-out single to right field. Minori Naito broke the tie in the third inning on a two-run home run, and Japan led 5–1 in the fourth after another home run by Yamato Fujita. Tarni Stepto replaced Parnaby on the mound mid–inning, allowing a hit and sacrifice fly to give Japan a 6–1 lead. Miu Goto came in after Ueno allowed a one-out walk in the fifth inning and struck out Chelsea Forkin with the bases loaded to end Australia's threat. In the bottom of the fifth, Yu Yamamoto ended the game on a homer to center field, making it 8–1 and triggering the Olympics run-rule victory.

21 July 12:00 (JST) Fukushima Azuma Baseball Stadium 31 °C (88 °F)
Team	1	2	3	4	5	6	7	R	H	E
Italy	0	0	0	0	0	0	0	0	1	2
United States	0	0	0	1	1	0	X	2	5	0
WP: Cat Osterman (1–0) LP: Greta Cecchetti (0–1) Sv: Monica Abbott (1); Boxscore

The United States started veteran Cat Osterman on the mound, who struck out the first two batters before hitting Emily Carosone and inducing a pop out to end the first inning. Greta Cecchetti pitched for Italy. Haylie McCleney reached first on an error, but was out at second on a Janie Reed fielder's choice. Reed stole second and Valerie Arioto walked, but the Americans could not score. After four innings, Osterman had yet to allow a hit. In the bottom of the fourth, a walk, sacrifice bunt, and Michelle Moultrie single gave the United States a 1–0 lead. In the fifth, Andrea Filler singled for Italy's only hit, but they could not score. American catcher Aubree Munro singled in the sixth inning and reached second on an error, then a McCleney single left runners at first and third. Alexia Lacatena replaced Cecchetti, and the United States scored its second run on a Janie Reed sacrifice fly. In the seventh inning, Monica Abbott replaced Osterman and struck out the side to give the United States a 2–0 win.

21 July 15:00 (JST) Fukushima Azuma Baseball Stadium 33 °C (91 °F)
Team	1	2	3	4	5	6	7	R	H	E
Mexico	0	0	0	0	0	0	0	0	2	0
Canada	2	0	1	1	0	0	X	4	9	0
WP: Sara Groenewegen (1–0) LP: Dallas Escobedo (0–1) Sv: Danielle Lawrie (1); Home runs: MEX: None; CAN: Jennifer Salling (1); Boxscore

Facing Mexico's Dallas Escobedo, Victoria Hayward singled to lead off. A bunt single by Larissa Franklin and two more singles from Kaleigh Rafter and Jenn Salling gave Canada a 2–0 lead as Mexico came to bat. Three years after recovering from Legionnaires' disease, Sara Groenewegen started on the mound for Canada and retired the first six Mexican batters. In the third inning, Salling added to Canada's lead with a solo home run to right field. In the fourth, Hayward singled again, stole second, moved to third on a ground out, and scored on a Kelsey Harshman single to make it 4–0 Canada. Jenna Caira replaced Groenewegen in the fifth, and Danielle Lawrie came on in the sixth for Canada and pitched the remainder of the game to record the save.

=== 22 July ===
22 July 09:00 (JST) Fukushima Azuma Baseball Stadium 26 °C (79 °F)
Team	1	2	3	4	5	6	7	R	H	E
United States	0	0	0	0	1	0	0	1	7	1
Canada	0	0	0	0	0	0	0	0	1	1
WP: Monica Abbott (1–0) LP: Jenna Caira (0–1); Boxscore

Sara Groenewegen started for Canada after a loss to Japan the previous day. The Americans loaded the bases in the top of the first on a single by Haylie McCleney, a fielder's choice, a single by Amanda Chidester, and Ali Aguilar hit by a pitch. Groenewegen struck out Michelle Moultrie to end the inning. Monica Abbott started for the United States after recording a save the previous day. Through two innings, both pitchers recorded four strikeouts. Jenna Caira relieved Groenewegen in the third and retired six consecutive batters. In the top of the fifth, the Americans took the lead when Chidester singled to score McCleney. Abbott remained dominant, striking out nine and allowing just one hit in a complete game shutout.

22 July 12:00 (JST) Fukushima Azuma Baseball Stadium 28 °C (82 °F)
Team	1	2	3	4	5	6	7	8	R	H	E
Mexico	0	0	0	0	1	0	1	0	2	6	0
Japan (8)	0	1	0	0	1	0	0	1	3	5	0
WP: Miu Goto (1–0) LP: Danielle O'Toole (0–1); Home runs: MEX: Anissa Urtez (1); JPN: Yamato Fujita (2); Boxscore

Yukiko Ueno began the game on her 39th birthday, while Danielle O'Toole started for Mexico. Yamato Fujita opened the scoring in the bottom of the second with a solo home run, her second of the tournament, to give Japan a 1–0 lead. Anissa Urtez tied the game for Mexico with a fifth inning solo home run to center field. Japan took a 2–1 lead when Haruka Agatsuma doubled in the bottom half of the fifth. Ueno remained in the game to start the seventh inning. Anissa Urtez hit a fly ball to center field which Eri Yamada dropped, scoring Suzy Brookshire and tying the game. Miu Goto relieved Ueno and escaped the jam. Japan could not score in the seventh, sending the game to extra innings. In the top of the eighth inning, Canada loaded the bases with no outs, but Moto struck out the side. Japan won in their half of the eighth when a Mana Atsumi bunt scored Eri.

22 July 15:00 (JST) Fukushima Azuma Baseball Stadium 31 °C (88 °F)
Team	1	2	3	4	5	6	7	R	H	E
Italy	0	0	0	0	0	0	0	0	4	0
Australia	0	1	0	0	0	0	X	1	4	0
WP: Kaia Parnaby (1–1) LP: Greta Cecchetti (0–2) Sv: Ellen Roberts (1); Boxscore

In the final game in Fukushima, Kaia Parnaby started for Australia, and Greta Cecchetti started for the Italians. In the bottom of the second, Taylah Tsitsikronis doubled to left field and advanced to third on a Tarni Stepto groundout. She scored when Jade Wall beat out an infield single to second base. Australia held the lead the rest of the game, with Ellen Roberts reliving Parnaby in the seventh with runners on first and second and striking out Marta Gasparotto to keep Australia's hopes for a medal alive.

=== 24 July ===
24 July 10:00 (JST) Yokohama Stadium 29 °C (84 °F)
Team	1	2	3	4	5	6	7	R	H	E
Australia	1	0	0	0	0	0	0	1	6	2
Canada	3	3	0	1	0	0	X	7	8	0
WP: Jenna Caira (1–1) LP: Ellen Roberts (0–1); Boxscore

Australia and Canada began the second half of the group stage, now in Yokohama after the previous day's opening ceremony. Facing Sara Groenewegen, Australia loaded the bases in the first with no outs on a Leigh Godfrey single, Stacey Porter ground rule double, and Taylah Tsitsikronis hit by pitch. They took a 1–0 lead when Jade Wall walked, but Groenewegen struck out the next two batters to end the threat. Canada, facing Ellen Roberts, responded with three runs in the first inning. Victoria Hayward scored when third baseman Stacey Porter threw Larissa Franklin's ground out past the first baseman, and Canada added two more runs on a ground rule double by Jenn Salling. Australia loaded the bases again in the top of the second. Jenna Caira replaced Groenewegen and escaped without allowing any runs. In the bottom of the second, a throwing error by Chelsea Forkin at first base plated another run for Canada, and they made it 6–1 after a ground rule double by Erika Polidori. Emma Entzminger knocked in another run in the fourth inning with the bases loaded to give Canada a 7–1 lead, with Lauren Regula pitching the seventh to end the game.

24 July 14:30 (JST) Yokohama Stadium 29 °C (84 °F)
Team	1	2	3	4	5	6	7	R	H	E
United States	0	0	2	0	0	0	0	2	6	1
Mexico	0	0	0	0	0	0	0	0	1	3
WP: Cat Osterman (2–0) LP: Dallas Escobedo (0–2) Sv: Monica Abbott (2); Boxscore

Mexico sent Dallas Escobedo to the mound to try to secure Mexico's first tournament win, while the United States started Cat Osterman. Mexico got its only hit in the bottom of the second, when Victoria Vidales beat out an infield hit to the shortstop. In the top of the third, a leadoff walk and Haylie McCleney single saw Escobedo replaced by Danielle O'Toole, who got two outs and intentionally walked Valerie Arioto before Ali Aguilar singled to center field to give the United States a 2–0 lead. In the top of the sixth, Anissa Urtez threw out Arioto at home on a ground out, keeping the score close. Monica Abbott pitched a scoreless seventh inning to secure a third tournament win for the United States.

24 July 20:00 (JST) Yokohama Stadium 28 °C (82 °F)
Team	1	2	3	4	5	6	7	R	H	E
Japan	0	0	0	2	0	3	0	5	6	0
Italy	0	0	0	0	0	0	0	0	3	0
WP: Miu Goto (2–0) LP: Alexia Lacatena (0–1); Home runs: JPN: Yu Yamamoto (2), Yamato Fujita (3); ITA: None; Boxscore

Yamato Fujita, pitching for the first time in the tournament, started the game for Japan. She pitched two scoreless innings before allowing a double to Beatrice Ricchi and being relieved by Miu Goto, who struck out a batter and got two ground outs to escape the third inning. In the top of the fourth, third baseman Yu Yamamoto hit a two-run homer to give Japan a 2–0 lead. Fujita, batting next, hit a deep fly ball that Laura Vigna kept in the park. In the sixth inning, Fujita gave Japan three more runs on her third home run of the tournament. Moto, who struck out nine of 19 batters, pitched the remainder of the game to give Japan its third win.

=== 25 July ===
25 July 10:00 (JST) Yokohama Stadium 32 °C (90 °F)
Team	1	2	3	4	5	6	7	8	R	H	E
Australia	0	0	0	0	0	0	0	1	1	3	0
United States (8)	0	0	0	0	0	0	0	2	2	5	0
WP: Monica Abbott (2–0) LP: Tarni Stepto (0–1); Boxscore

Monica Abbott started for the United States and recorded a scoreless first. Tarni Stepto, pitching for Australia, surrendered a leadoff triple to Haylie McCleney, who was thrown out at home two batters later by shortstop Clare Warwick on an Amanda Chidester fielder's choice. The teams traded quick innings until the top of the sixth, when Australia loaded the bases on Leigh Godfrey's single and walks from Stacey Porter and Jade Wall. Abbott struck out Michelle Cox to keep the game scoreless. With no score after seven innings, the game moved into extras. Belinda White, began the inning at second base, and moved to third on a Godfrey sacrifice bunt. Abbott intentionally walked Porter, then walked Taylah Tsitsikronis and Wall to give Australia a 1–0 lead. In the bottom half, McCleney singled and a Janie Reed sacrifice bunt left runners at second and third. Amanda Chidester won the game for the United States on a single to left field.

25 July 14:30 (JST) Yokohama Stadium 33 °C (91 °F)
Team	1	2	3	4	5	6	7	8	R	H	E
Canada	0	0	0	0	0	0	0	0	0	4	1
Japan (8)	0	0	0	0	0	0	0	1	1	6	0
WP: Miu Goto (3–0) LP: Danielle Lawrie (0–1); Boxscore

Japan returned to Yukiko Ueno to start its fourth tournament game, while Canada started Sara Groenewegen. Groenewegen pitched three innings, allowing three hits and striking out two before Jenna Caira took over through the fourth. After Haruka Agatsuma walked and Mana Atsumi grounded out, Danielle Lawrie came in to pitch for Canada and recorded two ground outs to escape unharmed. Ueno, meanwhile, allowed four hits and struck out four batters in six innings; Miu Goto took over in the seventh and struck out the side. In the bottom of the seventh, Eri Yamada singled and advanced to second on a sacrifice bunt. After pinch-hitter Sayaka Mori reached first on an error by shortstop Janet Leung, Lawrie intentionally walked Nodoka Harada and induced a line out from Yuka Ichiguchi to end Japan's threat and send the game to extra innings. In the top of the eighth, Moto again struck out the side. Japan began the eighth with Minori Naito at second base, and she advanced to third on a sacrifice bunt. Canada intentionally walked two batters to load the bases; Japan sent Hitomi Kawabata to third to run for Naito. Yamada ended the game by singling to center, plating Kawabata. With the win, Japan qualified for the gold medal match. Canada's loss sent the United States to the gold medal match as well to face Japan.

25 July 20:00 (JST) Yokohama Stadium 29 °C (84 °F)
Team	1	2	3	4	5	6	7	R	H	E
Italy	0	0	0	0	0	0	0	0	1	0
Mexico	0	1	1	0	3	0	X	5	9	0
WP: Dallas Escobedo (1–2) LP: Greta Cecchetti (0–3); Home runs: ITA: None; MEX: Sydney Romero (1), Anissa Urtez (2), Brittany Cervantes (1); Boxscore

Dallas Escobedo and Greta Cecchetti each started their third game of the tournament for Mexico and Italy, respectively. Mexico opened the scoring when Chelsea Gonzales doubled to send Suzy Brookshire home. They added another run in the third with a Sydney Romero solo home run. After a two-run homer in the fifth by Anissa Urtez made it 4–0, Italy relieved Cecchetti on the mound with Alexia Lacatena, who immediately allowed a Brittany Cervantes solo home run. Escobedo, who surrendered her first and only hit in the sixth to Laura Vigna, completed the game by striking out Giulia Longhi. It was Mexico's first win in the Olympic Games and kept them in the running for the bronze medal match.

=== 26 July ===
26 July 10:00 (JST) Yokohama Stadium 29 °C (84 °F)
Team	1	2	3	4	5	6	7	R	H	E
Japan	1	0	0	0	0	0	0	1	4	0
United States	0	0	0	0	0	1	1	2	4	1
WP: Monica Abbott (3–0) LP: Yamato Fujita (0–1); Home runs: JPN: None; USA: Kelsey Stewart (1); Boxscore

Japan faced the United States in a preview of the gold medal game to follow. Ally Carda started for the Americans in her first tournament pitching appearance. In the top of the first, Saki Yamazaki reached safely on an error by Kelsey Stewart and advanced to second on a sacrifice bunt. Hitomi Kawabata’s single left runners at the corners, and Yamazaki scored an unearned run on a passed ball by Aubree Munro, giving Japan a 1–0 lead. Yamato Fujita, pitching for Japan, held the United States scoreless for 5⅓ innings, while Carda struck out the side in the second and held Japan at bay through the fifth. Cat Osterman relieved Carda in the sixth, striking out two batters. In the bottom of the sixth, Haylie McCleney and Janie Reed singled. After a fielder's choice advanced McCleney, Val Arioto tied the game with a single to left field. Ali Aguilar walked to load the bases, but Delaney Spaulding flied out to end the inning. Monica Abbott pitched a perfect top of the seventh, preserving the tie. Facing Fujita in the bottom of the seventh, Kelsey Stewart ended the game with a home run to right field.

26 July 14:30 (JST) Yokohama Stadium 31 °C (88 °F)
Team	1	2	3	4	5	6	7	R	H	E
Canada (6)	0	1	1	0	3	3	X	8	7	1
Italy	0	0	1	0	0	0	X	1	4	1
WP: Lauren Bay-Regula (1–0) LP: Greta Cecchetti (0–4); Home runs: CAN: Jennifer Gilbert (1); ITA: None; Boxscore

Greta Cecchetti started for Italy, looking for its first win in the tournament. Lauren Bay-Regula started for Canada, awaiting the results of Mexico–Australia to determine their bronze medal match opponent. In the top of the second, Jenn Gilbert hit a home run to left-center field—her first tournament hit—to put Canada in front 1–0. In the third, Joey Lye tripled to the right field corner and tried to score on the next play, but was thrown out at home by Giulia Longhi on a fielder's choice. Canada increased its lead to 2–0 when Larissa Franklin doubled with two outs to plate Victoria Hayward. In the bottom of the third, Erika Piancastelli singled to center, scoring Laura Vigna for Italy's first and only run of the tournament. Alexia Lacatena relieved Cecchetti in the fifth inning, and Canada added to its lead on a sacrifice fly from Franklin and a single by Jenn Salling, who later scored when a throwing error from Lacatena allowed Erika Polidori to reach safely. In the sixth, Hayward doubled to center field to add two more runs. Another sacrifice fly from Franklin made it 8–1 Canada. Italy could not score in the bottom of the sixth, and the game ended on the Olympics run-ahead rule.

26 July 20:00 (JST) Yokohama Stadium 27 °C (81 °F)
Team	1	2	3	4	5	6	7	R	H	E
Mexico	0	2	0	2	0	0	0	4	11	0
Australia	0	0	0	0	0	1	0	1	5	0
WP: Dallas Escobedo (2–2) LP: Kaia Parnaby (1–2); Home runs: MEX: None; AUS: Jade Wall (1); Boxscore

Facing Kaia Parnaby, Mexico opened the scoring in the second when Suzy Brookshire tripled to left field to plate Brittany Cervantes, who later scored on a single from Tori Vidales. In the fourth inning, Vidales doubled to score Tatyana Forbes, who had run for Cervantes after she singled to open the inning. Gabbie Plain came in to replace Parnaby. Chelsea Gonzales singled to score Vidales, and Mexico led 4–0. Mexico would load the bases again but Ellen Roberts, relieving Plain, induced a ground out from Nicole Rangel to limit further damage. In the sixth inning, Jade Wall connected for a solo home run to make it 4–1. Escobedo completed the game with a perfect seventh to send Mexico to the bronze medal game.

== Final stage ==
=== Bronze medal match ===
27 July 13:00 (JST) Yokohama Stadium
Team	1	2	3	4	5	6	7	R	H	E
Mexico	0	0	1	0	1	0	0	2	7	1
Canada (bronze)	0	2	0	0	1	0	X	3	6	0
WP: Danielle Lawrie (1–1) LP: Danielle O'Toole (0–2); Boxscore

=== Gold medal match ===
27 July 20:00 (JST) Yokohama Stadium
Team	1	2	3	4	5	6	7	R	H	E
Japan (gold)	0	0	0	1	1	0	0	2	8	0
United States (silver)	0	0	0	0	0	0	0	0	3	0
WP: Yukiko Ueno (2–0) LP: Ally Carda (0–1); Boxscore

== See also ==
- Baseball at the 2020 Summer Olympics
