= Aussie Peppers =

Professional women's softball team

- Logo Logo as of 2019

Information
- League: National Pro Fastpitch
- Location: North Mankato, Minnesota
- Ballpark: Caswell Park Softball Complex
- Founded: 2018
- Former name: Aussie Spirit (2018)
- Ownership: Softball Australia
- General manager: Chris Clough; Matt Mangulis
- Coach: Laing Harrow
- Website: www.pepperspro.com

The Aussie Peppers were a professional softball team based in North Mankato, Minnesota. They were founded in 2018 as the Aussie Spirit as part of the National Pro Fastpitch league. The Aussie Peppers are partnered with the Australia women's national softball team and played their games at the Caswell Park Softball Complex.

== Current players ==
Aussie Peppers roster
Active roster (YYYY = Final season of player contract)		Inactive roster	Coaches
Pitchers: 6 Ellen Roberts (2020) (Australia); 7 Stephanie Trzcinski (2020) (Australia); 11 Justine Smethurst (2020) (Australia); 14 Tarni Stepto (Australia); 18 Coley Ries (2020); 23 Amelia Cudicio (2020) (Australia); 35 Monica Perry (2020); 42 Nicole Newman (2020) (Australia)	Catchers: 3 Carmelle Sorenson (2020) (Australia); 22 Belinda White (2020) (Australia); 65 Taylah Tsitsikronis (2020) (Australia); Utility players: 21 Tamieka Whitefiled (2020) (Australia); 31 Rachel Lack (2020) (Australia); Infielders: 16 Stacey Porter (2020) (Australia); 27 Georgia Blair (Australia); 44 Leah Parry (2020) (Australia); 24 Jessica Torpey (2020) (Australia); 65 Taylah Tsitsikronis (2020) (Australia); 4 Stacey McManus (2020) (Australia); 2 Clare Warwick (2020) (Australia); 8 Taylah Welch (2020) (Australia); 12 Jordan Lambert (2020); Outfielders: 1 Jade Wall (2020) (Australia); 5 Tahli Moore (2020) (Australia); 9 Janice Blackman (2020) (Australia); 17 Leigh Godfrey (2020) (Australia); 24 Jessica Torpey (2020) (Australia); 25 Chelsea Forkin (2020) (Australia); 29 Verity Long-Droppert (2020) (Australia); 43 Madeline Cameron (2020) (Australia); 47 Michelle Cox (2020) (Australia)		Legend: * Franchise Player Tag; (C) Captain; (A) Alternate captain; Roster updated June 9, 2019 → All NPF rosters
