= 2024 Women's Softball World Cup squads =

List of squads of the 2024 Women's Softball World Cup

The 2024 Women's Softball World Cup is an international softball tournament held in Italy, Ireland and Spain. The group stage runs from 11 to 26 July 2023. The 18 national teams involved in the tournament are required to register a squad of 16 players. Only players in these squads are eligible to take part in the tournament.

Group A squads were confirmed by WBSC on 10 July 2023.

== Group A ==
=== Australia ===
The roster was released on 5 May 2023.

2024 Women's Softball World Cup – Australia roster
Players		Coaches
Pitchers: 7 Grace Wrixon; 10 Kandra Lamb; 18 Kaia Parnaby; 19 Ellen Roberts	Catchers: 14 Belinda White (vice-captain); 20 Hayley Bonython; 22 Taylah Tsitsikronis; Infielders: 2 Clare Warwick (captain); 8 Tamieka Whitefield; 15 Georgia Hood; 21 Olivia Kuzminski; Outfielders: 1 Shannon Keevers; 11 Jade Wall; 12 Pippa Adkins; Utility: 4 Stacey McManus; 9 Kylie Steemers	Manager: Laing Harrow; Coaches: Chantelle James (Bench coach)

=== Botswana ===
2024 Women's Softball World Cup – Botswana roster
Players		Coaches
Pitchers: 5 Lesego Ditau; 8 Peselema Bothman; 10 Otsile Leave; 16 Wangu Gondo	Catchers: 4 Bafedile Dube; 11 Magdeline Mabutho; Infielders: 2 Segolame Pule; 3 Kedibonye Mogatusi; 7 Charity Isaac; 15 Amantle Matome; 17 Refilwe Mosepidi; 18 Tshegofatso Gaetepele; Outfielders: 1 Tshoganyetso Mosweu; 6 Maitumelo Serumola; 9 Onkokame Tlhakoyakgomo; 12 Bonolo Molefhe	Manager: Mosupakwena Ross; Coaches: Gopolang Matsila (Coach); Trevor Musa (Coach); Ayumi Yokosawa (Coach)

=== Chinese Taipei ===
2024 Women's Softball World Cup – Chinese Taipei roster
Players		Coaches
Pitchers: 2 Hsia-Ai Ke; 7 Ching-Yu Chen; 14 Chia-Chen Tsai; 26 An-Ju Chiu; 38 Ya-Ting Tu	Catchers: 4 Szu-Shih Li; 21 Chih-Ying Lin; Infielders: 5 Feng-Chen Lin; 6 Yi-Hsuan Su; 11 Chia-Hui Ko; 22 Hsuan Liu; 30 Yi-Ting Yang (captain); Outfielders: 1 Chia-Wen Shen; 28 Ting-En Chiang; 31 Chia-Yi Chen; 32 Chia-Yun Chang	Manager: Hsin-Lin Han; Coaches: Po-Jung Chen (Coach); Tzu-Lin Chiang (Coach); Yun-Chi Tung (Coach)

=== Great Britain ===
The roster was released on 19 June 2023.

2024 Women's Softball World Cup – Great Britain roster
Players		Coaches
Pitchers: 6 Rebecca Faulkner; 22 Georgina Corrick; 64 Hannah Edwards	Catchers: 1 Amy Moore; 25 Imogen Gie; Infielders: 7 Sydney Brown; 12 Morgan Salmon; 18 Alana Snow; 24 Cameron McGinnis; 36 Kendyl Scott; 66 Chloe Wigington; Outfielders: 5 Jessica Chan; 9 Tia Warsop; 20 Katie Burge; 21 Aubrey Peterson; 40 Mackenzie Langan	Manager: Tara Henry; Coaches: Linda Derk (Bench coach); Patrick Lewis (3B coach); Tahli Moore (Bench coach)

=== Ireland ===
The roster was released on 24 June 2023.

2024 Women's Softball World Cup – Ireland roster
Players		Coaches
Pitchers: 12 Jenna Devens; 18 Kailey O'Connor; 45 Summer Rocha; 77 Ariana Jarvis	Catchers: 24 Andreya Jarvis; 30 Sydney Horton; 41 Ceilidh Campbell; Infielders: 1 Hannah Monteleone; 6 Abby Horton; 21 Nicole Franklin; 35 Alexandra Monteleone (captain); Outfielders: 5 Niamh Dougherty; 23 Ciara Sullivan; 29 Jamison Brockenbrough; 36 Savannah Brockenbrough	Manager: Melanie Lavery; Coaches: Martin de Lange (Bench coach); Charles Rocha (Coach); Marcel Wester (1B coach)

=== United States ===
The roster was released on 14 April 2023.

2024 Women's Softball World Cup – United States roster
Players		Coaches
Pitchers: 3 Ally Carda (captain); 14 Montana Fouts; 24 Megan Faraimo; 28 Kelly Maxwell	Catchers: 21 Gwen Svekis; 33 Mia Davidson; Infielders: 2 Ali Aguilar; 5 Baylee Klingler; 37 Hannah Flippen; 96 Sis Bates; Outfielders: 4 Aliyah Andrews; 7 Maya Brady; 36 Kiki Milloy; 78 Jocelyn Alo; Utility: 10 Aubrey Leach; 27 Sahvanna Jaquish	Manager: Heather Tarr; Coaches: Richard Baldwin (Coach); Cynthia Malone (Pitching coach); Timothy Walton (Coach)

== Group B ==
=== South Africa ===
The roster was released on June 23, 2023.

- Katlego Aphane
- Nushka De Beer
- Pretty Gwangwa
- Elri Herman
- Hannah Hugo
- Cassandra Kalpens
- Ammaarah Larney
- Shane Luyt
- Emily Mahlalela
- Thandi Malebana
- Rachel Matsimela
- March Mercedes
- Itumeleng Moreroa
- Erin Peters
- Melissa Savage
- Johandri Van der Walt

=== Spain ===
The roster was released on June 2, 2023.

- Beatriz Alonso
- Estibaliz Alvarez
- Meritxell Blesa
- Carmen Caicoya
- Maria Caicoya
- Ariadna Cerda
- Yulan Denia
- Candela Garcia
- Sorangel Ledezma
- Alba Lopez
- Uxua Modrego
- Anyibel Ramirez
- Raquel Rodrigo
- Carla Segura
- Anna Sobrino
- Yaicey Sojo

== Group C ==
=== Canada ===
The roster was released on June 20, 2023.

2024 Women's Softball World Cup – Canada roster
Players		Coaches
Pitchers: 4 Samantha Ryan; 17 Sara Groenewegen; 18 Dawn Bodrug; 99 Morgan Rackel	Catchers: 2 Natalie Wideman; 15 Nicole Rivait; Infielders: 1 Kelsey Harshman; 13 Zoe Hicks; 14 Janet Leung; 19 Emma Entzminger; 22 Rylie Crane; 77 Grace Messmer; Outfielders: 3 Erika Polidori; 5 Callum Pilgrim; 26 Larissa Franklin; 44 Kianna Jones	Manager: 0 Kaleigh Rafter; Coaches: Chris Jones; Christian Conrad; Jennifer Salling

=== New Zealand ===
The roster was released on February 16, 2023.

- Lara Andrews
- Amy Begg
- Erin Blackmore
- Rebecca Bromhead
- Meeki Cooper Nicola
- Emma Francis
- Shyah Hale
- Tyneesha Houkamau
- Nerissa McDowell
- Tyla Morrison
- Katrina Nukunuku
- Loran Parker
- Pallas Potter
- Otila Tavite
- Mikayla Werahiko
- Brooke Whiteman

== Statistics ==
Note: Only the final squad list of each national team is taken into consideration. Age is taken from the first day of the tournament.

=== Age ===
- Oldest: (Botswana) Charity Isaac (38 years, 38 days)
- Youngest: (United Kingdom) Jessica Chan (17 years, 32 days)
