= Jodie Stevenson =

Australian softball player

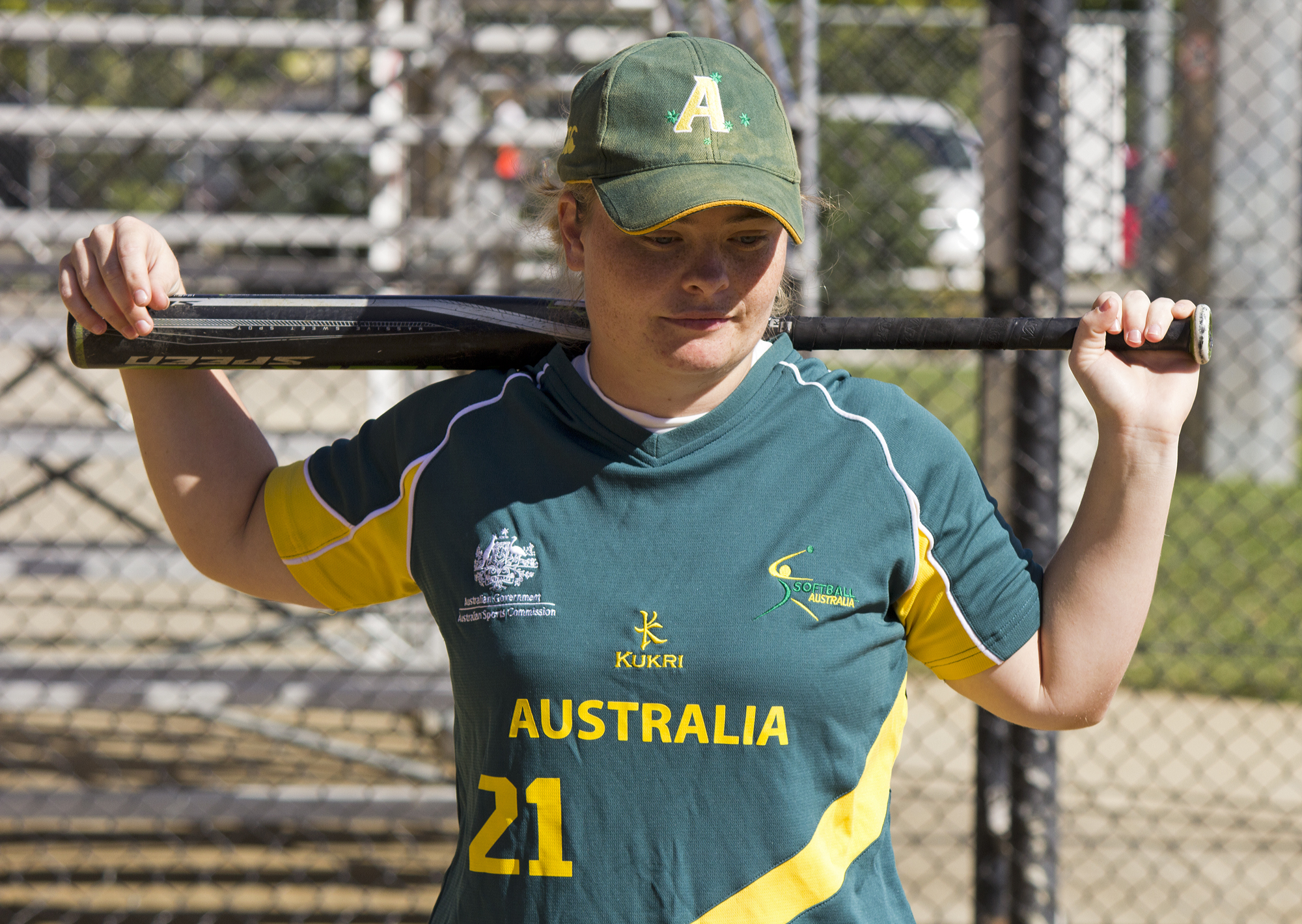
- Stevenson in March 2012 during a photoshoot

Personal information
- Born: December 1986; Perth, Western Australia

Sport
- Country: Australia
- Sport: Softball
- Event: Women's team

Jodie Stevenson (born December 1986 in Perth) is an Australian softball player. She has represented Western Australia on the junior and women's open national level, where she has competed in national championships. She has represented Australia as a member of the Australia women's national softball team on the junior and senior level, and competed at the 2007 Junior World Championships. She is trying to earn a spot to compete at the 2012 ISF XIII Women's World Championships

== Personal ==
Stevenson was born in December 1986 in Perth, Western Australia. She is from Western Australia.

== Softball ==
In 2008, Stevenson played for a local side at the Northern Territory titles. In 2009, she played for an Australian Institute of Sport team.

=== State team ===
Stevenson has represented Western Australia on the national level. She was with the team in 2002 when they played a game against Tasmania at the Australian U16 girls' Fastpitch Softball Championship. During the competition, she was part of the team that beat the Victorian side 4-3 and contributed to the game with quality hitting. In her team's 12–2 defeat by the Australian Capital Territory, she hit a home run which was described by the Hobart Mercury as one of the best of the tournament. Her team also beat Victoria in the championships. She was a member of the U23 Western Australian team that lost to the Victorian team in the national championships in 2007. Her play at the tournament was described by a Darwin newspaper as outstanding.

=== Junior national team ===
Stevenson has represented Australia on the junior national team. She represented Australia at the 2007 Junior World Championships in the Netherlands. She has represented Australia on the junior national level in 2008.

=== Senior national team ===
Stevenson is a member of the Australia women's national softball team. In March 2009, she participated in a Brisbane-based training camp. In 2011, she was a member of the Australian side that competed at the World Cup of Softball. She played in game at the Cup against the United States where Australia lost 5–2. It was her second loss on the day, also having played in a game where Australia lost to Japan. She is a member of the 2012 Australia women's national softball team and is trying to earn a spot to compete at the 2012 ISF XIII Women's World Championships.
