= Jennifer Gilbert =

Canadian softball player

Personal information
- Born: February 3, 1992 (age 34) Saskatoon, Saskatchewan
- Height: 178 cm (5 ft 10 in)
Medal record
Women's softball
Representing Canada
Olympic Games
Bronze medal – third place	2020 Tokyo	Team
Pan American Games
Silver medal – second place	2019 Lima

Jennifer Gilbert (born February 3, 1992) is a Canadian softball player.

== Career ==
Gilbert competed at the 2019 Pan American Games in Lima, winning silver.

In June 2021, Gilbert was named to Canada's 2020 Olympic team.
