= Fukushima Azuma Baseball Stadium =

Baseball venue in Fukushima, Japan

Coordinates: 37°43′17″N 140°21′49″E

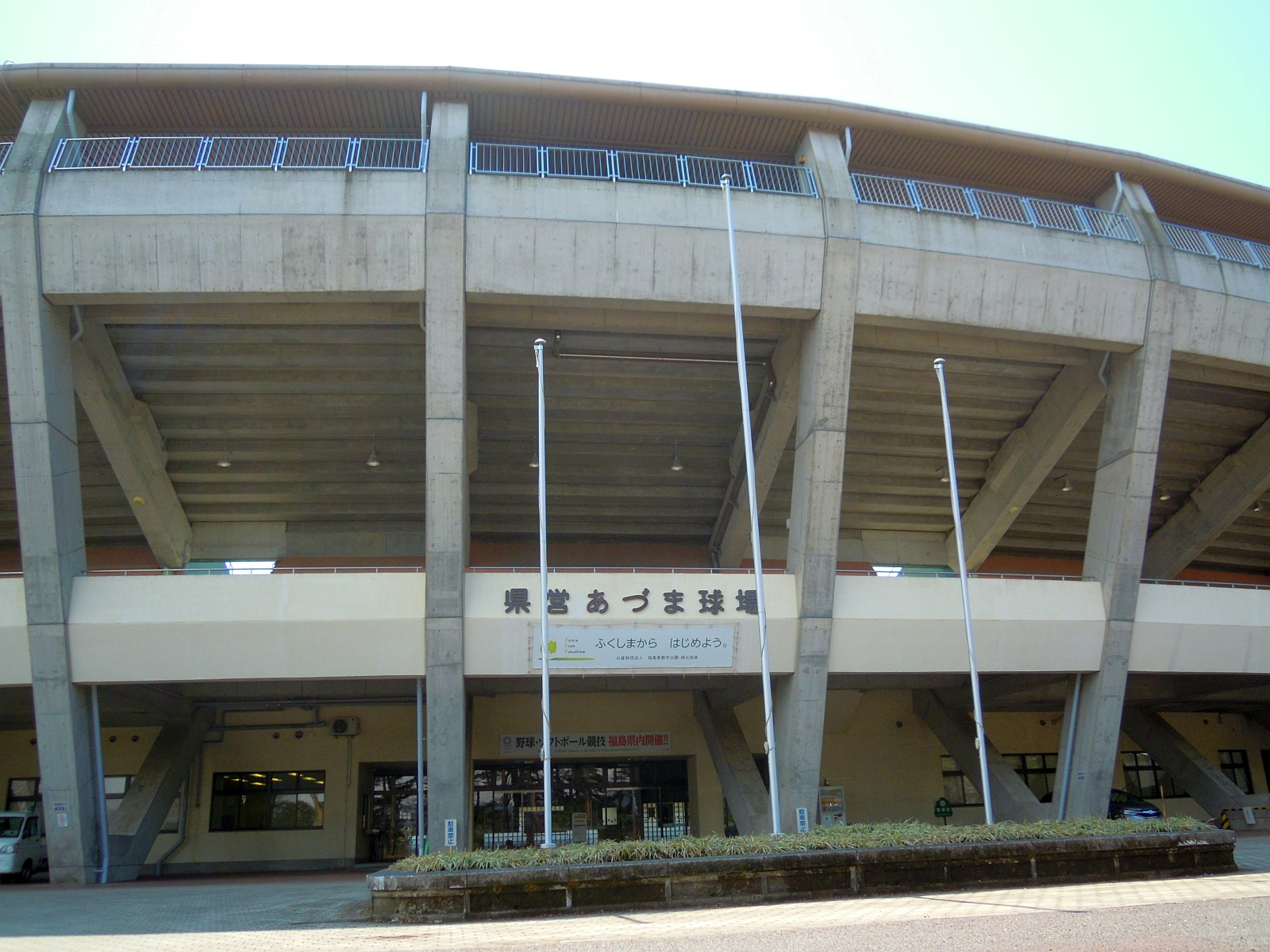
- Interactive map of Fukushima Azuma Baseball Stadium
- Location: Fukushima, Japan
- Capacity: 30,000

Construction
- Opened: 1986

Tenant
- Fukushima RedHopes (BCL) (2014–present)

Fukushima Azuma Baseball Stadium (福島県営あづま球場, Fukushima Ken'ei Azuma Kyūjō) is a multi-purpose stadium in Fukushima, Japan. It is currently used mostly for baseball matches. The stadium was originally opened in 1986 and has a capacity of 30,000 spectators.

It was the baseball and softball venue for tournament opening matches at the 2020 Summer Olympics.
