= Nayu Kiyohara =

Japanese softball player

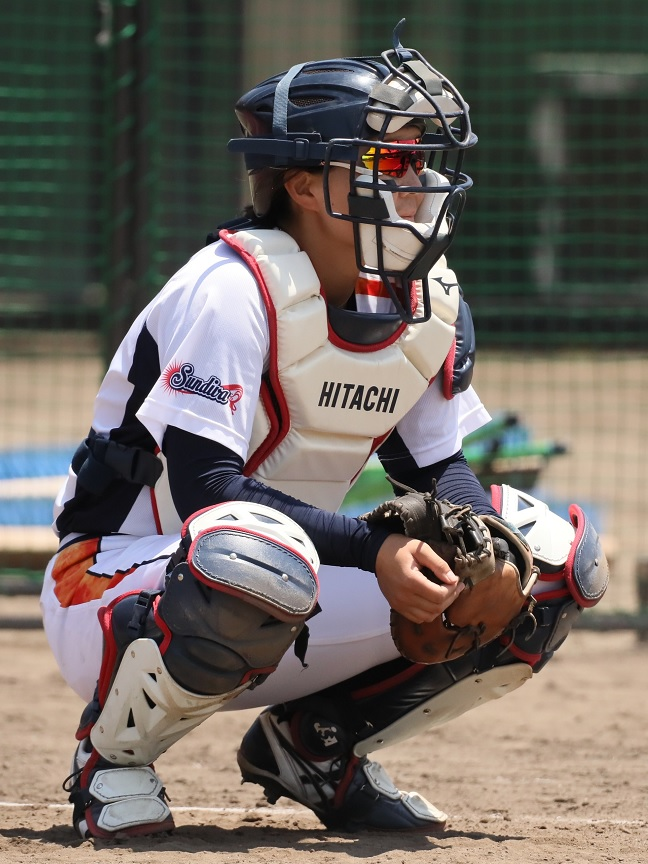
- Kiyohara in 2022

Hitachi Sundiva – No. 21
- Catcher
- Born: May 1, 1991 (age 34); Osaka, Japan
- Bats: Right Throws: Right
Medals
Women's softball
Representing Japan
Olympic Games
Gold medal – first place	2020 Tokyo	Team

Nayu Kiyohara (清原 奈侑, Kiyohara Nayu) is a Japanese softball player who plays as a catcher. She represented Japan at the 2020 Summer Olympics and won a gold medal.
