= Delaney Spaulding =

American softball player

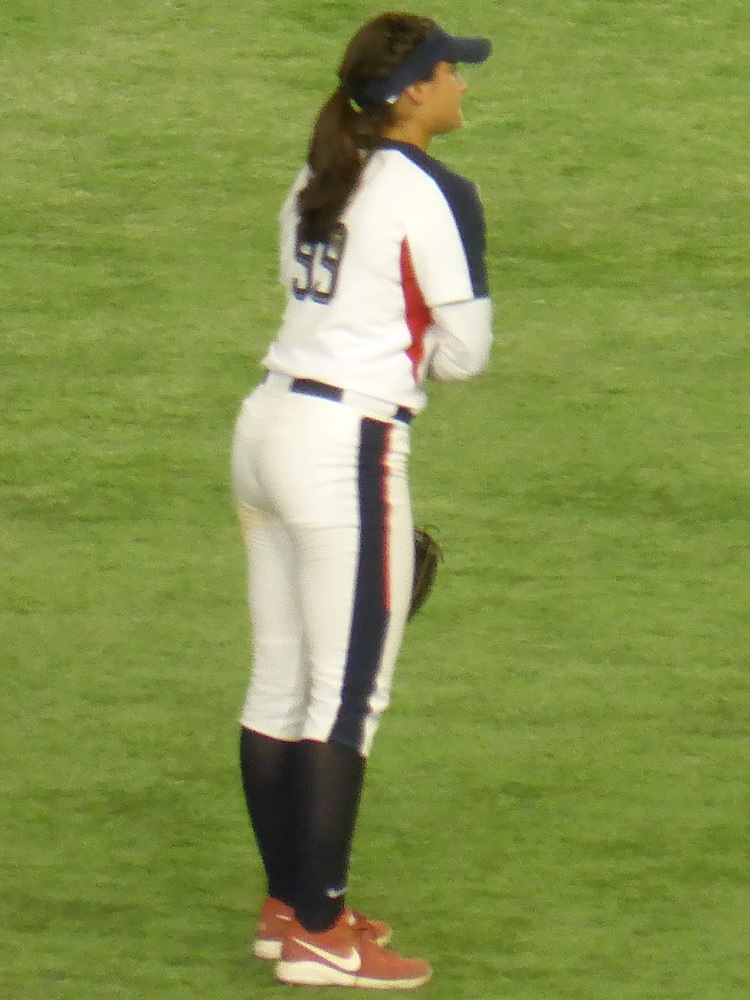
- Spaulding in 2016

Personal information
- Born: May 9, 1995 (age 31) Rancho Cucamonga, California, U.S.

Sport
- Country: USA
- Sport: Softball
Medal record
Women's softball
Representing United States
Olympic Games
Silver medal – second place	2020 Tokyo	Team

Delaney Lyn Spaulding (born May 9, 1995) is an American, former collegiate All-American, medal-winning Olympian, softball shortstop. Spaulding played college softball for the UCLA Bruins in the Pac-12 Conference from 2014 to 2017. She represented the United States at the 2020 Summer Olympics and won a silver medal.

== Career ==
Spaulding has been named a Second Team and three-time First Team All-Pac-12 player. She was also chosen twice as a National Fastpitch Coaches Association Second Team All-American.

== Personal life ==
Delaney has a sister who also played college softball at North Carolina, Danielle Spaulding.

== International career ==
Delaney has played for Team USA since 2016 and competed at the 2020 Summer Olympics and won a silver medal. During the tournament, she recorded a double and four walks for the team. During the gold medal game against Team Japan, Spaulding recorded one walk in a 2–0 loss.

== Statistics ==
UCLA Bruins
YEAR	G	AB	R	H	BA	RBI	HR	3B	2B	TB	SLG	BB	SO	SB	SBA
2014	60	173	59	61	.352	50	8	3	15	106	.612%	40	33	18	24
2015	63	189	69	75	.397	72	20	3	20	161	.852%	37	20	7	10
2016	57	170	52	58	.341	61	17	0	9	118	.694%	27	32	6	7
2017	63	205	58	78	.380	46	16	1	18	146	.712%	22	21	6	6
TOTALS	243	737	238	272	.369	229	61	7	62	531	.720%	126	106	37	47

Team USA
YEAR	G	AB	R	H	BA	RBI	HR	3B	2B	TB	SLG	BB	SO	SB
2021	22	55	7	15	.272	12	3	1	2	27	.710%	6	8	1
Olympics	6	14	0	1	.071	0	0	1	0	2	.143%	4	1	0
TOTALS	28	69	7	16	.232	12	3	2	2	31	.449%	10	9	1
