= Rachel Lack =

Australian softball player

Personal information
- Born: 15 August 1994 (age 31)

Sport
- Country: Australia
- Sport: Softball, Baseball
- Event: Australian National Team "Aussie Spirit"
Medal record
Softball
Representing Australia
ISF Junior Women's World Championships
ISF Women's World Championships

Rachel Lack (born 15 August 1994) is an Australian softball player.

She studied at Barker College and went to West Pennant Hills Public School, and University of Hawaii.

She played for Aussie Peppers.

She participated at the 2014 Softball World Championship.

Lack was selected for the Australian women's national softball team at the 2020 Summer Olympics. The team came away with one win out of five, beating Italy 1-0 in their second match of the Round Robin and finished fifth overall. Full details are in Australia at the 2020 Summer Olympics.
