= Amanda Chidester =

American softball player (born 1990)

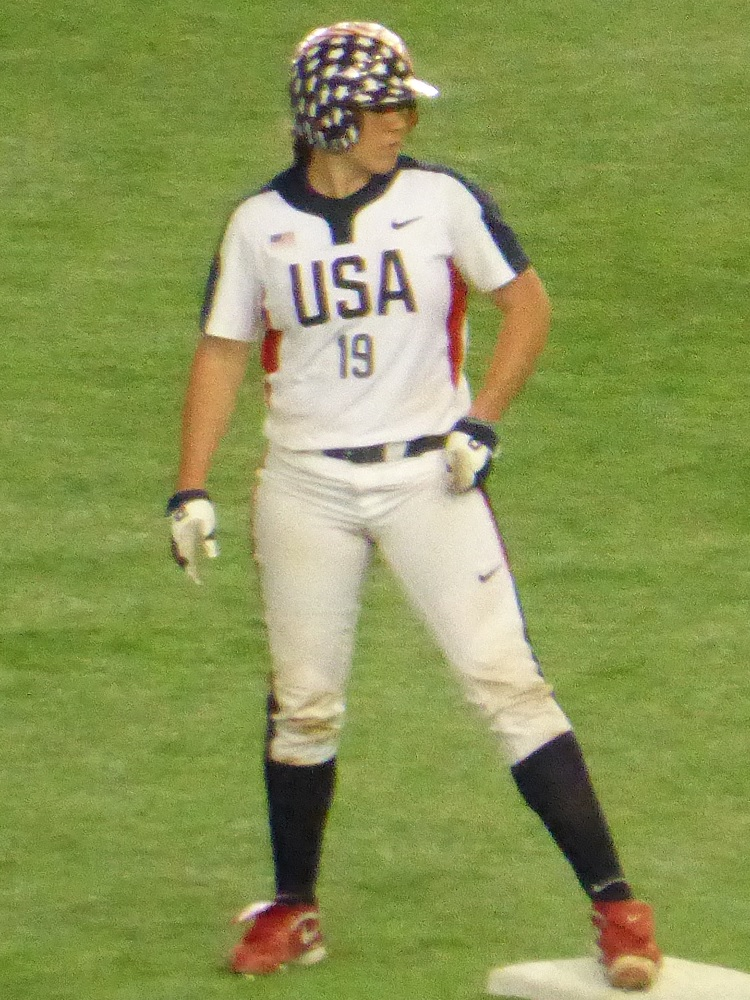
- Chidester in 2016

Current position
- Title: Assistant coach
- Team: Michigan
- Conference: Big Ten

Biographical details
- Born: April 11, 1990 (age 36); Allen Park, Michigan, U.S.
- Education: Michigan

Playing career
- 2009–2012: Michigan
- 2016: Scrap Yard Dawgs
- 2019: Chicago Bandits
- Position: Catcher

Coaching career (HC unless noted)
- 2023–present: Michigan (Asst.)

Accomplishments and honors

Awards
- NPF Player of the Year (2019); All-NPF Team (2019)
Medal record
Women's softball
Representing United States
Olympic Games
Silver medal – second place	2020 Tokyo	Team
Pan American Games
Silver medal – second place	2015 Toronto	Team

Amanda Marie Chidester (born April 11, 1990) is an American former professional softball player and current assistant coach for Michigan. She was named National Pro Fastpitch Player of the Year for the Chicago Bandits in 2019. She has been a member of the USA Softball Women's National Team on-and-off since 2012. She played college softball at Michigan from 2009 to 2012 and was named First Team All-Big Ten three of her seasons. She was twice selected as the Big Ten Conference Player of the Year and National Fastpitch Coaches Association All-American. Chidester represented Team USA at the 2020 Summer Olympics and won a silver medal. In 2021, Chidester played her second season in the Athletes Unlimited Softball league and placed second in individual points earned.

== Early life ==
Chidester was born in 1990 and grew up in Allen Park, Michigan. She attended St. Francis Cabrini High School, graduating in 2008. As a senior in 2008, she was selected as the Detroit Catholic League Female Athlete of the Year. In 2007, she was named the Gatorade Michigan Softball Player of the Year. She was also selected as a first-team EA Sports All-American in both 2007 and 2008.

== College career ==
Chidester enrolled at the University of Michigan in the fall of 2008. As a freshman in the spring of 2009, Chidester appeared in 58 games and led the Michigan softball team with a .350 batting average. She was selected as a second-team NFCA All-American and a first-team All-Big Ten player.

As a sophomore in 2009, Chidester started all 57 games for Michigan, including 56 games at second base.

As a junior in 2010, Chidester moved to third base. She started all 58 games for Michigan, including 51 at third base and seven at catcher. She led the team with a .423 batting average and 75 RBIs. At the end of the season, she was selected as the Big Ten Conference Player of the Year and a first-team NFCA All-American at third base.

As a senior in 2011, Chidester was the captain of the Michigan softball team. She started 58 games for Michigan, including 13 at third base and 45 at first base. She compiled a .347 batting average with 46 RBIs and was named Big Ten Player of the Year for the second consecutive year. On May 25, 2013, she became the second Michigan Wolverines softball player to reach 200 career RBIs.

== Team USA ==
In June 2012, Chidester was named to the USA Softball Women's National Team. She hit a grand slam to lead Team USA to a victory over Brazil in the 2012 World Cup of Softball.

At the Tokyo Games, Chidester garnered four hits and drove in three runs for Team USA. She and the team lost in the gold medal game against Team Japan 2-0 on July 27, 2021, with Chidester going making three outs at the plate.

== Professional career ==
During the 2019 season, Chidester was named the NPF Player of the Year, NPF Offensive Player of the Year, and Home Run Award winner.

== Coaching career ==
On September 6, 2022, Chidester was named an assistant coach for the Michigan Wolverines softball team.

== Personal life ==
Chidester is openly lesbian and is married to Mexican softball player Anissa Urtez on June 28, 2024.

== Statistics ==
Michigan Wolverines
YEAR	G	AB	R	H	BA	RBI	HR	3B	2B	TB	SLG	BB	SO	SB	SBA
2009	58	183	37	64	.349	38	8	3	10	104	.568%	11	22	0	2
2010	57	164	34	49	.299	41	9	0	8	84	.512%	14	20	1	2
2011	58	175	49	74	.423	75	13	1	9	124	.708%	21	15	1	3
2012	58	176	37	61	.346	46	10	1	12	105	.596%	31	22	2	2
TOTALS	231	698	157	248	.355	200	40	5	39	417	.593%	77	79	4	9

Team USA
YEAR	G	AB	R	H	BA	RBI	HR	3B	2B	TB	SLG	BB	SO	SB
2020	13	32	4	7	.219	6	0	0	1	8	.250%	2	3	0
2021	31	84	22	30	.357	27	7	0	5	56	.666%	13	13	2
Olympics	6	20	0	4	.200	3	0	0	2	6	.300%	0	4	1
TOTAL	50	136	26	41	.301	36	7	0	8	70	.514%	15	20	3

Athletes Unlimited Softball
YEAR	G	AB	R	H	BA	RBI	HR	3B	2B	TB	SLG	BB	SO	SB
2020	15	50	3	15	.300	13	3	2	1	29	.580%	4	8	0
2021	15	46	12	19	.413	12	7	0	1	41	.891%	9	6	0
TOTAL	30	96	15	34	.354	25	10	2	2	70	.729%	13	14	0
