= Saki Yamazaki =

Japanese softball player

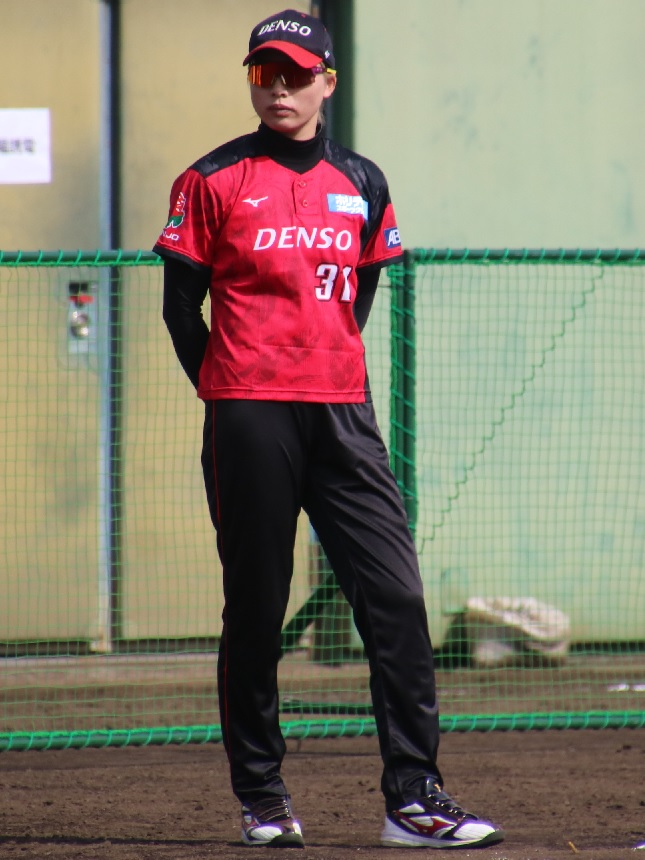

Toyota Red Terriers – No. 2
- Outfield
- Born: 12 November 1991 (age 34); Kakegawa, Japan
- Bats: Right Throws: Right
Medals
Women's softball
Representing Japan
Olympic Games
Gold medal – first place	2020 Tokyo	Team
World Cup
Silver medal – second place	2016 Surrey	Team
Silver medal – second place	2018 Chiba	Team
Asian Games
Gold medal – first place	2018 Jakarta-Palembang	Team
Asian Championship
Gold medal – first place	2019 Jakarta	Team

Saki Yamazaki (山崎早紀, born 12 November 1991) is a Japanese softball player. She competed in the 2020 Summer Olympics.
