= Sayaka Mori =

Japanese softball player

Bic Camera Takasaki Bee Queen – No. 9
- Outfield
- Born: 29 September 1988 (age 37); Japan
- Bats: Right Throws: Right
Medals
Women's softball
Representing Japan
Olympic Games
Gold medal – first place	2020 Tokyo	Team
World Cup
Gold medal – first place	2014 Haarlem	Team

Sayaka Mori (森 さやか, Mori Sayaka, born 29 September 1988) is a Japanese softball player. She competed in the 2020 Summer Olympics and won a gold medal.
