= Mana Atsumi =

Japanese softball player (born 1989)

Atsumi Mana
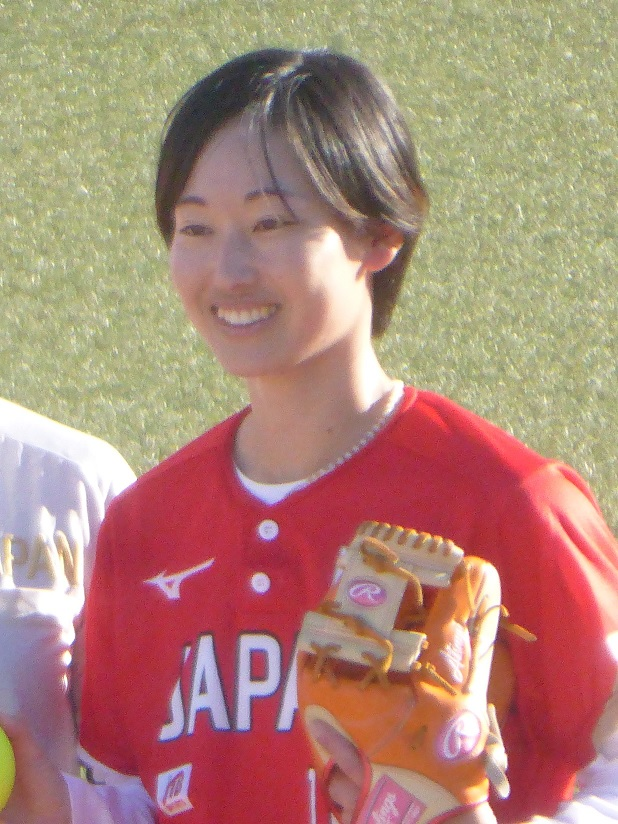
- Atsumi in 2023

Toyota Red Terriers – No. 12
- Infielder
- Born: June 15, 1989 (age 36); Hamamatsu, Japan
- Bats: Left Throws: Right
Medals
Women's softball
Representing Japan
Olympic Games
| Gold medal – first place | 2020 Tokyo | Team |
World Cup
| Silver medal – second place | 2016 Surrey | Team |
| Silver medal – second place | 2018 Chiba | Team |
Asian Games
| Gold medal – first place | 2018 Jakarta-Palembang | Team |
Asian Championship
| Gold medal – first place | 2017 Taichung | Team |
| Gold medal – first place | 2019 Jakarta | Team |

Atsumi Mana (渥美万奈, born 1 June 1989) is a Japanese softball player who plays as an infielder. She represented Japan at the 2020 Summer Olympics and won a gold medal.

She participated at the 2013 Canada Cup and the 2016 Women's Softball World Championship.

Atsumi was a member of Japan's gold medal winning team at the 2020 Tokyo Olympics. She helped turn a clutch double play in the 6th inning of the gold medal game against the American team, to maintain Japan's 2-0 lead.
