= Ali Aguilar =

American softball player (born 1995)

Talons
- Shortstop
- Born: August 28, 1995 (age 30); Roseville, California, U.S.
- Bats: Left Throws: Right

Teams
- Washington (2014–2017); United States National Team (2016); Scrap Yard Dawgs (2017); Toyota Motor (2018); Talons (2025–present)

Career highlights and awards
- NPF Champion (2017)
Medals
Women's softball
Representing United States
Olympic Games
Silver medal – second place	2020 Tokyo	Team
Pan American Games
Gold medal – first place	2019 Lima	Team
Gold medal – first place	2023 Santiago	Team

Alison Paige Aguilar (born August 28, 1995) is an American professional softball player for the Talons of the Athletes Unlimited Softball League (AUSL). She played college softball at Washington from 2014 to 2017 where she was named a three-time First Team All-Pac-12 and a National Fastpitch Coaches Association Second and Third Team All-American in her last two years. She won the Cowles Cup with the Scrap Yard Dawgs of the National Pro Fastpitch in 2017. She also played professionally in Japan. She represented Team USA at the 2020 Summer Olympics and won a silver medal.

== Early life ==
Aguilar was born in Roseville, California to parents Mark and Kristin Aguilar. Aguilar started softball at an early age, playing for multiple youth softball leagues and travel teams, including the Folsom Flash and All American Sports Academy. She graduated from Casa Roble High School in Orangevale, California in 2013 with a 3.8 GPA and with four letters in softball.

== Playing career ==
=== College ===
Aguilar played college softball at Washington. She came to Washington as a slap hitter, but Husky coach, Heather Tarr, decided that she should swing away. Aguilar made this transition, and became one of the best power hitters in the country, hitting 21 home runs in her Junior season in 2016.

=== Professional ===
Aguilar was drafted thirteenth overall by the Scrap Yard Dawgs in the 2017 NPF Draft. During her first season with the team, she helped the team win the Cowles Cup, their first championship in program history.

On January 29, 2025, Aguilar was drafted in the seventh round, 25th overall, by the Talons in the inaugural Athletes Unlimited Softball League draft.

== International career ==
Aguilar was selected to represent the United States at the 2016 Women's Softball World Championship, where the team won the gold medal. Aguilar hit .273 in the tournament with a Home Run and 5 RBIs.

On August 31, 2023, Aguilar was named to the U.S. women's national team for the 2023 Pan American Games.

== Statistics ==
Washington Huskies
YEAR	G	AB	R	H	BA	RBI	HR	3B	2B	TB	SLG	BB	SO	SB	SBA
2014	51	153	35	50	.327	38	7	0	8	79	.516%	14	32	5	6
2015	59	190	66	78	.410	58	16	1	23	151	.794%	30	37	7	7
2016	54	170	76	62	.364	70	21	0	15	140	.823%	39	38	1	1
2017	58	176	62	62	.352	42	14	1	11	117	.665%	35	19	4	5
TOTALS	222	689	239	252	.365	208	58	2	57	487	.707%	118	126	17	19

Scrap Yard Dawgs
YEAR	G	AB	R	H	BA	RBI	HR	3B	2B	TB	SLG	BB	SO	SB
2017	12	32	8	8	.250	7	3	0	3	20	.625%	4	12	1

Team USA
YEAR	G	AB	R	H	BA	RBI	HR	3B	2B	TB	SLG	BB	SO	SB
2020	15	46	17	26	.565	27	4	1	4	44	.956%	6	2	0
2021	31	98	21	30	.306	26	7	1	4	54	.683%	11	14	3
Olympics	6	10	0	1	.100	2	0	0	0	1	.100%	5	2	0
TOTAL	52	154	38	57	.370	55	11	2	8	102	.662%	22	18	3

== Personal life ==
Aguilar is a Christian. She has said “I used to eat, breathe and sleep softball. But when God was introduced to my life and became my life, softball no longer defined me. God’s plans and the ability He's given me in softball are why I play. I see His hand in every part of my journey. Embodying the character of Christ is my end goal; it's not just about winning a gold medal. I want to let the light of Christ shine through me.”
