= Erika Polidori =

Canadian softball player (born 1992)

Personal information
- Born: January 26, 1992 (age 34) London, Ontario, Canada
- Height: 163 cm (5 ft 4 in)
Medal record
Women's softball
Representing Canada
Olympic Games
Bronze medal – third place	2020 Tokyo	Team
Women's World Cup
Bronze medal – third place	2024 Castions di Strada	Team
Pan American Games
Gold medal – first place	2015 Toronto	Team
Silver medal – second place	2019 Lima	Team
Bronze medal – third place	2023 Santiago	Team

Erika Polidori (born January 26, 1992) is a Canadian softball player.

== Playing career ==
Polidori competed at the 2015 Pan American Games in Toronto, winning the gold medal, and again at the 2019 Pan American Games in Lima, winning silver.

In June 2021, Polidori was named to Canada's 2020 Olympic team.

Polidori represented Canada at the 2024 Women's Softball World Cup and won a bronze medal.

== Personal life ==
Besides being a softball player, Polidori is also a nurse.
