= Minori Naito =

Japanese softball player

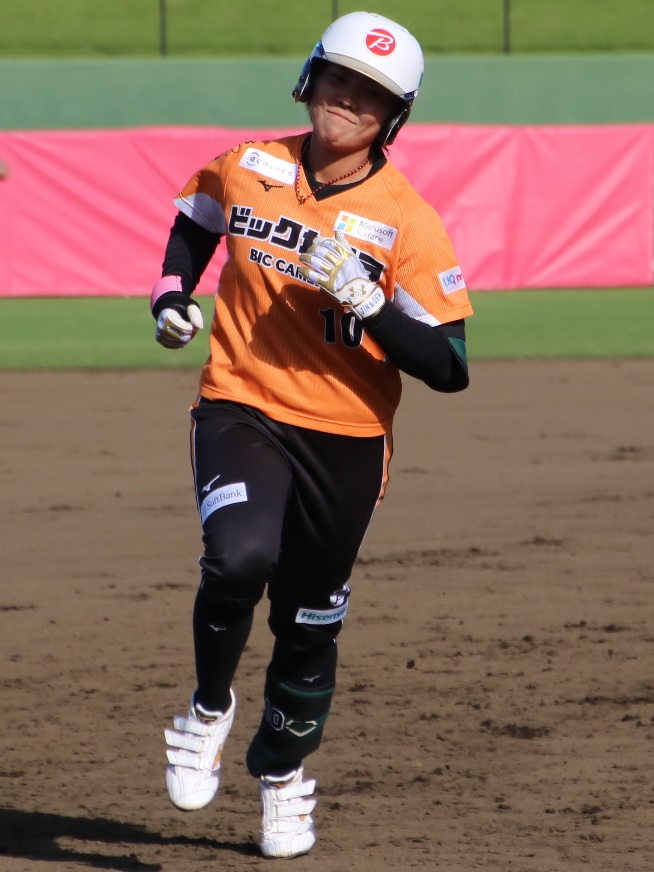
- Naito in 2023

Bic Camera Takasaki Bee Queen – No. 14
- Infield
- Born: April 26, 1994 (age 32); Osaka, Japan
- Bats: Right Throws: Right
Medals
Women's softball
Representing Japan
Olympic Games
Gold medal – first place	2020 Tokyo	Team
World Cup
Silver medal – second place	2018 Chiba	Team
World Games
Silver medal – second place	2022 Birmingham	Team
Bronze medal – third place	2025 Chengdu	Team
Asian Games
Gold medal – first place	2018 Jakarta-Palembang	Team
Asian Championship
Gold medal – first place	2019 Jakarta	Team

Minori Naito (Japanese: 内藤実穂, born 26 April 1994) is a Japanese softball player. She competed in the 2020 Summer Olympics and won a gold medal.
