= Larissa Franklin =

Canadian softball player (born 1993)

Personal information
- Born: March 26, 1993 (age 33) Maple Ridge, British Columbia, Canada
- Height: 173 cm (5 ft 8 in)
Medal record
Women's softball
Representing Canada
Olympic Games
| Bronze medal – third place | 2020 Tokyo | Team |
Women's World Cup
| Bronze medal – third place | 2024 Castions di Strada | Team |
Pan American Games
| Gold medal – first place | 2015 Toronto | Team |
| Silver medal – second place | 2019 Lima | Team |
| Bronze medal – third place | 2023 Santiago | Team |

Larissa Franklin (born March 26, 1993) is a Canadian Olympic softball player.

== Career ==
Franklin joined Team Canada in 2011, competing in the 2011 WBSC Junior Women's World Championship in Cape Town, South Africa, where her team finished fifth. After joining the senior team in 2013, Franklin competed in the World Cup of Softball and the WBSC Americas Qualifier, winning a silver medal with her team. Franklin has continued playing for Canada, competing in international events such as the 2014, 2016 and 2018 WBSC Women's Softball World Championships, where she won bronze in the latter two events. In 2015, she and her team competed at the 2015 Pan American Games in Toronto, where they won gold, and in the 2019 Pan American Games in Lima, where they won silver. In June 2021, Franklin was named to Canada's 2020 Olympic team.

Franklin represented Canada at the 2024 Women's Softball World Cup and won a bronze medal.

== Personal life ==
Franklin is openly lesbian.
