= Bubba Nickles =

American softball player (born 1998)

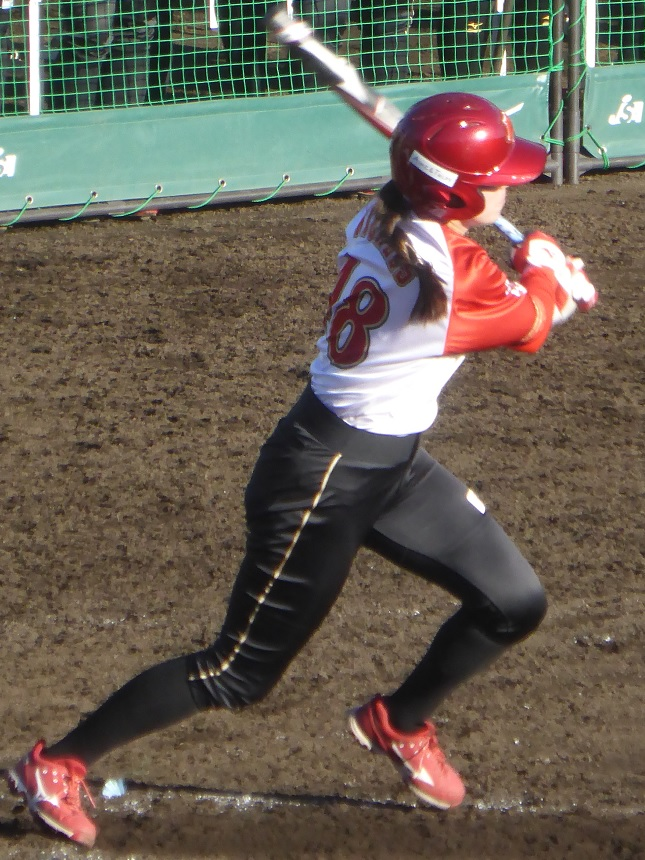
- Nickles in 2023

Personal information
- Full name: Madilyn Ida-Marie Nickles-Camarena
- Born: March 8, 1998 (age 28) Merced, California, U.S.

Sport
- Country: USA
- Sport: Softball
- College team: UCLA Bruins
- Team: Oklahoma City Spark
Medal record
Women's softball
Representing United States
Olympic Games
Silver medal – second place	2020 Tokyo	Team
World Games
Gold medal – first place	2022 Birmingham	Team
Gold medal – first place	2025 Chengdu	Team

Madilyn "Bubba" Ida-Marie Nickles-Camarena (born March 8, 1998) is an American professional softball player for the Oklahoma City Spark of the Athletes Unlimited Softball League (AUSL). She played college softball for the UCLA Bruins, where she was named an All-American and won a national championship in 2019. She currently serves as an assistant coach at UCLA. She represented the United States at the 2020 Summer Olympics and won a silver medal.

== Playing career ==
Nickles competes with the UCLA Bruins softball team and has been named a two-time Second Team and First Team All-Pac-12 player. She was also chosen a National Fastpitch Coaches Association First Team All-American as a junior, where she also helped lead the Bruins to the 2019 NCAA Division I National Championship. She made her professional debut with Athletes Unlimited in 2021. Nickles also played for the Toyota Red Terriers of the Japan Diamond Softball League. She won the 2024 AUX Softball competition with 1,344 points, defeating Jocelyn Alo for the Championship by only six leaderboard points, in the closest finish in Athletes Unlimited history.

On January 29, 2025, Nickles was drafted in the fourth round, 14th overall, by the Bandits in the inaugural Athletes Unlimited Softball League draft.

== Coaching career ==
On October 2, 2024, Nickles was named an assistant coach at UCLA for the 2025 NCAA Division I softball season.

== Team USA ==
Nickles played for two seasons with Team USA and was named to the roster for the 2020 Summer Olympics, where she won a silver medal Nickles had a hit in two appearances during the tournament. Nickles did not play in the gold medal game, where Team USA was defeated by Team Japan 2–0.

== Personal life ==
Nickles is of Chamorro descent. She is the daughter of Natalie and Ted Nickles, and has one older sister.

== Statistics ==
UCLA Bruins
YEAR	G	AB	R	H	BA	RBI	HR	3B	2B	TB	SLG	BB	SO	SB	SBA
2017	63	188	36	53	.282	35	10	0	10	93	.494%	10	19	4	4
2018	65	184	36	76	.413	52	10	2	14	124	.674%	19	15	0	1
2019	62	210	66	82	.390	72	18	1	12	150	.714%	24	27	6	7
2021	27	77	16	24	.311	22	4	1	6	58	.753%	6	8	0	0
TOTALS	217	659	154	235	.356	181	42	4	42	411	.623%	59	69	10	12

Team USA
YEAR	G	AB	R	H	BA	RBI	HR	3B	2B	TB	SLG	BB	SO	SB
2020	15	33	14	11	.333	8	1	0	1	15	.454%	10	4	0
2021	8	23	2	2	.087	0	0	0	0	2	.087%	1	7	0
Olympics	2	2	0	1	.500	0	0	0	0	1	.500%	1	1	0
TOTAL	25	58	20	14	.241	8	1	0	1	18	.310%	12	12	0
