= Janet Leung =

Canadian Olympian

Charros de Jalisco
- Infielder
- Born: April 25, 1994 (age 32); Mississauga, Ontario, Canada
- Bats: Right Throws: Right

Teams
- Brown Bears (2012–2016); Charros de Jalisco (2026–present)
Medals
Women's Softball
Representing Canada
Olympic Games
Bronze medal – third place	2020 Tokyo	Team
Women's World Cup
Bronze medal – third place	2018 Chiba	Team
Bronze medal – third place	2024 Castions di Strada	Team
Pan American Games
Silver medal – second place	2019 Lima	Team
Bronze medal – third place	2023 Santiago	Team

Janet Leung (born April 25, 1994) is a professional Canadian softball player for the Charros de Jalisco of the Mexican Softball League and member of the Canadian Senior Women’s National team. She played professionally for the Canadian Wild of the National Pro Fastpitch (NPF). She played college softball at Brown University from 2012 to 2016 and earned All-Ivy all four years. She has been a member of Canada women's national softball team since 2017 and helped the team make history by winning Canada's first medal in the sport at the 2020 Summer Olympics.

== Career ==
Leung played college softball for the Brown Bears in the Ivy League from 2012 to 2016.

Leung competed at the 2019 Pan American Games in Lima, winning silver.

In June 2021, Leung was named to Canada's 2020 Olympic team. During the Olympics, Leung had two hits and one walk, recording one of her hits during the bronze medal game and scoring the winning run to help Canada defeat Team Mexico.

Leung represented Canada at the 2024 Women's Softball World Cup and won a bronze medal.

In December 2025, Leung joined the Charros de Jalisco of the Mexican Softball League ahead of the 2026 season.
