= Yamato Fujita =

Japanese softball player (born 1990)

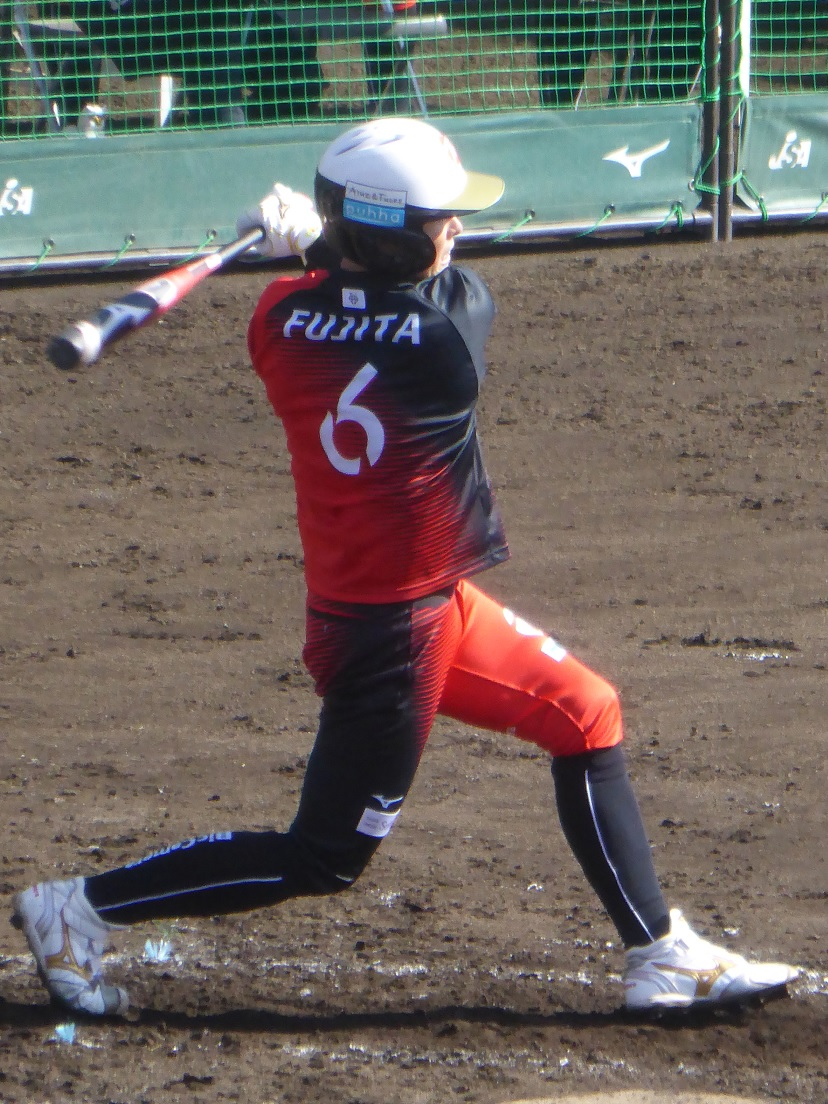
- Fujita in 2023

Bic Camera Takasaki Bee Queen – No. 6
- Pitcher
- Born: 18 December 1990 (age 35); Sasebo, Japan
- Bats: Right Throws: Right
Medals
Women's softball
Representing Japan
Olympic Games
Gold medal – first place	2020 Tokyo	Team
World Cup
Gold medal – first place	2012 Whitehorse	Team
Gold medal – first place	2014 Haarlem	Team
Silver medal – second place	2016 Surrey	Team
Silver medal – second place	2018 Chiba	Team
World Games
Silver medal – second place	2022 Birmingham	Team
Asian Games
Gold medal – first place	2014 Incheon	Team
Gold medal – first place	2018 Jakarta-Palembang	Team
Asian Championship
Gold medal – first place	2017 Taichung	Team
Gold medal – first place	2019 Jakarta	Team

Yamato Fujita (藤田 倭, Fujita Yamato; born 18 December 1990) is a Japanese softball pitcher for the Japan women's national softball team. She represented Japan at the 2020 Summer Olympics and won a gold medal.

She participated at the 2018 Asian Games, and the 2018 Women's Softball World Championship.
