= Kelsey Harshman =

Canadian softball player (born 1996)

Personal information
- Born: November 10, 1996 (age 29) Tucson, Arizona, USA
- Height: 166 cm (5 ft 5 in)
Medal record
Women's softball
Representing Canada
Olympic Games
| Bronze medal – third place | 2020 Tokyo | Team |
Women's World Cup
| Bronze medal – third place | 2024 Castions di Strada | Team |
Pan American Games
| Bronze medal – third place | 2023 Santiago | Team |

Kelsey Harshman (born November 10, 1996) is a Canadian softball player of American descent.

== Career ==
Harshman was part of the bronze medal winning team at the 2018 Women's Softball World Championship. She played collegiate softball for the Wisconsin Badgers.

In June 2021, Harshman was named to Canada's 2020 Olympic team.

Harshman represented Canada at the 2024 Women's Softball World Cup and won a bronze medal.
