= Anissa Urtez =

American softball player and coach

Biographical details
- Born: January 18, 1995 (age 31); Long Beach, California, U.S.

Playing career
- 2014–2017: Utah
- 2017–2018: Scrap Yard Dawgs
- 2019: Cleveland Comets
- 2020–2021: Athletes Unlimited
- 2022: Toda Medics
- 2025: Blaze
- Position: Infielder

Coaching career (HC unless noted)
- 2019: Utah Valley (Asst.)

Anissa Nicole Urtez (born January 18, 1995) is an American professional softball player for the Blaze of the Athletes Unlimited Softball League (AUSL). She played college softball for Utah. She represented Mexico at the 2020 Summer Olympics.

== Early life ==
Urtez attended high school at Downey High School in Downey, California. During her junior year, she hit .577 with 36 runs scored, 44 RBIs, 10 home runs, 18 extra-base hits and a .990 slugging percentage. She was subsequently named San Gabriel Valley League (SGVL) MVP, first-team All San Gabriel Valley League, and Press-Telegram Player of the Year. During her senior year in 2012, she broke every Downey High School record.

== College career ==
Urtez played college softball at Utah. During her freshman year in 2014, she batted for a .353 average and was second on the team with 18 extra-base hits, 10 doubles, three triples and six home runs. She finished second in the league with 149 assists at shortstop, and was named All-Pac-12 Honorable Mention, and Pac-12 All-Freshman Team. During her sophomore year in 2015, she started all 55 games for the Utes at shortstop, where she led the Pac-12 with 12 sacrifice bunts, and ranked in the top ten in the Pac-12 with 106 assists. After the season she was named Honorable Mention Pac-12 All-Defensive Team.

During her junior year in 2016, she posted a .380 average with 70 hits, 16 doubles, four home runs, 46 RBI. She led the conference in doubles, and assists (142), and ranked sixth in hits, and RBI. Following the season she was named First Team All Pac-12. During her senior year in 2017, she posted a .410 average with eight doubles, two triples, two home runs, 52 RBI and 138 assists. She ranked fourth in the Pac-12 in batting average and RBI. Following the season she was named Second Team All Pac-12. She finished her career ranking in the top-five in both doubles (42) and RBIs (161) in Utah history.

== Professional career ==
On July 9, 2017, Urtez signed with the Scrap Yard Dawgs. During her first season in 2017, she batted .231, while posting a .333 on-base percentage, a .308 slugging percentage, and .941 fielding percentage. She helped the Scrap Yard Dawgs win their first Cowles Cup in franchise history. During the 2019 season, she played for the Cleveland Comets where she hit .301 in 73 at-bats.

On January 29, 2025, Urtez was drafted in the fifth round, 18th overall, by the Blaze in the inaugural Athletes Unlimited Softball League draft.

== Coaching career ==
Urtez served as assistant coach for Utah Valley softball team during the 2018–19 season.

== International career ==
Urtez represented Team Mexico at the 2017 World Cup of Softball, where she led the team in singles and runs scored. She represented Team Mexico at the 2018 International Cup, where she hit .313, and led the team in hits. She also posted a .500 slugging percentage, .899 OPS and did not commit an error among 25 chances. She represented Team Mexico at the 2020 Summer Olympics, where she hit the first home run in Mexican Olympic softball history in their second game against Japan.

== Personal life ==
Urtez is openly lesbian and is married to American softball player Amanda Chidester on June 28, 2024.
