= Tarni Stepto =

Australian softball player

Personal information
- Nationality: Australian
- Born: 6 October 1999 (age 26) Sydney, New South Wales, Australia
- Height: 183 cm (6 ft 0 in)

Sport
- Country: Australia
- Sport: Softball
- Event: Australian National Team "Aussie Spirit"
- College team: Oregon State University

Achievements and titles
- Olympic finals: 2020 Tokyo Olympics
Medal record
Softball
Representing Australia

Tarni Stepto is an Australian female softball Olympian. She was born in Sydney, NSW, Australia in 1999.

== Early life ==
Stepto was born into a sports-enthusiastic family. She started playing softball at a young age. Her sister was a pitcher, so she also tried pitching and was good at it.

She made her junior national team debut as a teenager and was selected to her first NSW team in 2015. In 2017 she was crowned the Most Valuable Player at the U17 National Championships. She was also selected as the Best Pitcher and Best Player of the Grand Final awards.

In 2018, in her first year in the Australian senior side, she participated in the Pacific Cup. She was then selected in the Championship squad.

Stepto's inspiration was her fellow Kamilaroi woman and Tokyo 2020 teammate Stacey Porter.

== Achievements ==
In order to experience the American collegiate softball game, Stepto enrolled at the Oregon State University. In her first year she was made the Scenic West Athletic Conference Pitcher of the Year.

Stepto was selected for the Australian women's national softball team at the 2020 Summer Olympics. The team came away with one win out of five, beating Italy 1–0 in their second match of the Round Robin and finished fifth overall. Stepto pitched against the United States.
