= Leigh Godfrey =

Australian softball player

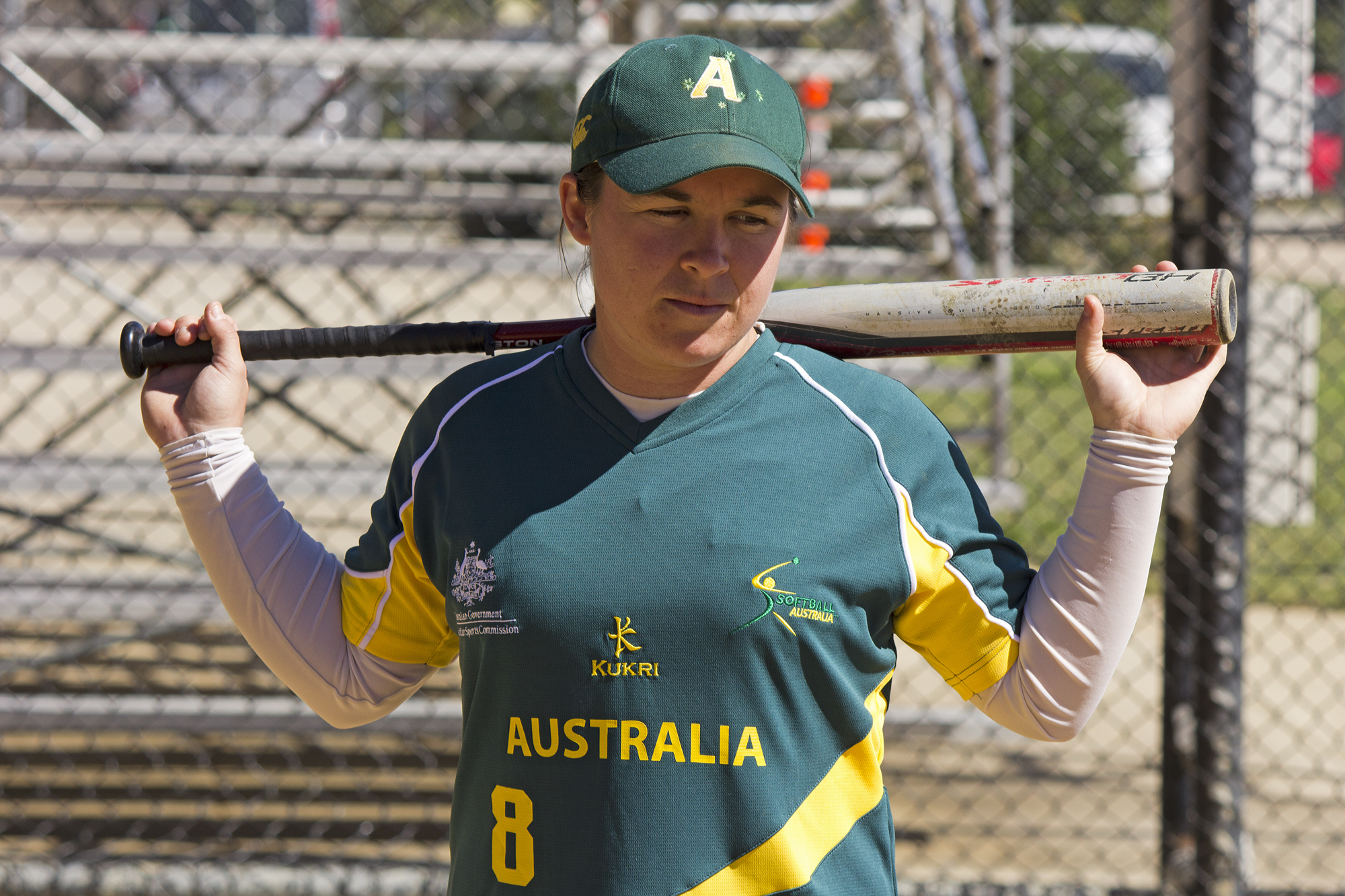
- Godfrey in March 2012 during a photoshoot

Personal information
- Full name: Leigh Melissa Godfrey
- Nickname: MSC Leigh (Big Spuds)
- Nationality: Australian
- Born: 26 April 1989 (age 37) Melbourne, Victoria

Sport
- Country: Australia
- Sport: Softball
- College team: Radford University

Leigh Melissa Godfrey (born 26 April 1989) is an Australian softball player. She played softball for Radford University in the United States. In Australia, she represents Western Australia in national competitions. She has represented Australia on the junior and senior team. She is trying to earn a spot to compete at the 2012 ISF XIII Women's World Championships.

== Personal ==
Godfrey, full name Leigh Melissa Godfrey, was born on 26 April 1989 in Melbourne, Victoria. She is 160 centimetres (63 in) tall. She is from Winthrop, Western Australia. She has four siblings.

Godfrey attended Seton Catholic College. While there, she competed in swimming and Australian rules football. As a member of her high school team's Australian rules team, she was named the team MVP in 2006. She attended Radford University and was a freshman in 2009.

Her family has been actively involved with softball since 1973. Her mother, Robyn Godfrey, represented Australia at the 1981 World Youth Championships, the first year the competition was held. Her aunt Sue represented Australia at the 1982 World Series.

== Softball ==
Godfrey plays second base and shortstop. In 2008, she played for a local side at the Northern Territory titles. She played for Radford University's softball team in 2009. She has represented Western Australia on the national level on the Open Women's, U 23's, U 19's and Women's National League teams.

=== Junior national team ===
Godfrey represented Australia at the 2007 Junior World Championships in the Netherlands. In 2007, as a member of the U19 national team, she also participated in a softball tour of the Netherlands. She represented Australia on the junior national level in 2008.

=== Senior national team ===
Godfrey has represented Australia as a member of the senior national team. She was a member of the 2011 team and traveled with the team to North Carolina. She is a member of the 2012 Australia women's national softball team and is trying to earn a spot to compete at the 2012 ISF XIII Women's World Championships.

Godfrey was selected for the Australian women's national softball team at the 2020 Summer Olympics. The team came away with one win out of five, beating Italy 1–0 in their second match of the Round Robin and finished fifth overall. Full details are in Australia at the 2020 Summer Olympics.
