= Emma Entzminger =

Canadian softball player (born 1996)

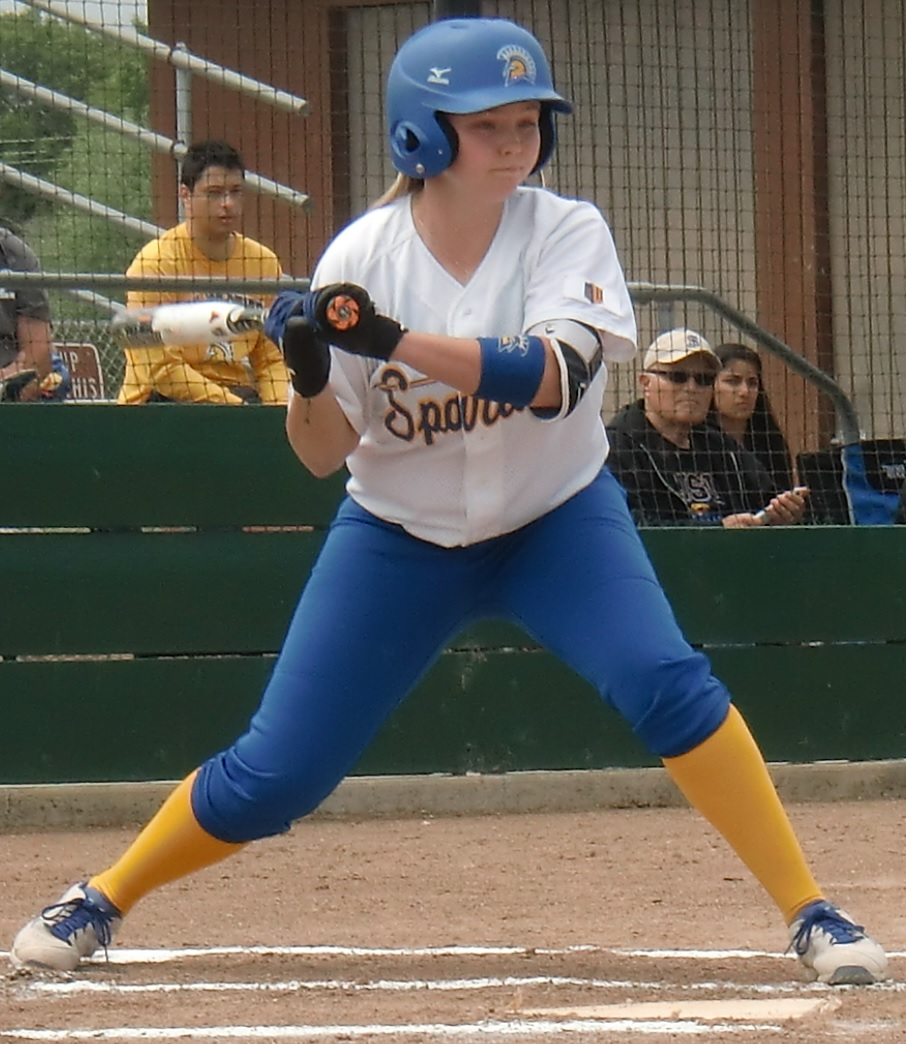
- Entzminger in 2017 with San Jose State University.

Personal information
- Born: January 11, 1996 (age 30) Victoria, British Columbia
- Height: 165 cm (5 ft 5 in)

Sport
- Sport: Softball
- Position: Third base
- University team: San Jose State Spartans
Medal record
Women's softball
Representing Canada
Olympic Games
Bronze medal – third place	2020 Tokyo	Team
Pan American Games
Silver medal – second place	2019 Lima	Team
Bronze medal – third place	2023 Santiago	Team

Emma Alyce Entzminger (born January 11, 1996) is a Canadian softball infielder with the Canada women's national softball team. Entzminger played college softball at San Jose State University in the U.S. First named to the Canada national team in 2015, Entzminger competed with the team at the 2015 Pan American Games and later the 2018 Women's Softball World Championship. Entzminger went on to win three international medals with Canada, a silver medal at the 2019 Pan American Games and bronze medal at the 2023 Pan American Games and a bronze medal at the 2020 Summer Olympics.

== Early life and education ==
Entzminger was born in Victoria, British Columbia and graduated from Lambrick Park Secondary School in Victoria in 2014. At Lambrick Park, Entzminger played five sports: basketball, soccer, softball, tennis, and volleyball. After secondary school, Entzminger attended San Jose State University in the U.S. city of San Jose, California and played on the San Jose State Spartans softball team from 2015 to 2018. In four seasons, Entzminger played 206 games, primarily starting at third base in 2016 and 2017 and shortstop in 2018. Entzminger batted a career best .324 in 2016 and .269 as a senior in 2018. Entzminger graduated from San Jose State in 2018 with a bachelor's degree in kinesiology with an emphasis in exercise and rehab science.

== International career ==
In 2015, Entzminger was first named to the Canada women's national softball team and competed with the team in the 2015 Pan American Games. Entzminger returned to the Canadian national team in 2018 to compete in three tournaments, including the 2018 Women's Softball World Championship.

Entzminger competed at the 2019 Pan American Games in Lima, winning silver.

In June 2021, Entzminger was named to Canada's 2020 Olympic team.

== Personal life ==
Entzminger is in relationship with ice hockey player Kristen Campbell.
