= Leah Parry =

Australian softball player

Leah Parry (born 1 July 1980 in Western Australia) is an Australian female softball Olympian. She has over 140 caps for Australia. She was selected for the Tokyo 2020 Olympics.

== Early years ==
Parry began playing for the Fremantle Rebels in the Perth Softball League at a young age. She first represented Western Australia at the age of 13 in 1993.

== Achievements ==
In 2003, Parry was part of the Western Australia (WA) team that claimed its first Gilley's Shield win since 1959. She was also part of the WA team that won again in 2011 and 2013.

Parry was one of the players cut for the Spirit's Beijing 2008 squad. This was the last Olympic Games in which softball was included until being reintroduced for the Tokyo 2020 Olympics.

She was then selected for the 2010 World Championships but decided to retire for two years. She made a comeback when it was announced that softball was once more included as an Olympic sport in the 2020 Olympics.

Parry as a second baser, batting over 0.380 at Nationals, earned selection back into the Australian team for the 2019 Asia Pacific Cup.

Parry was selected in the Australian softball squad for the Tokyo 2020 Olympics. The team won 1 of 5 matches in the group stage and did not compete for a medal.
