= Australia women's national softball team =

Information
- Country: Australia
- Federation: Softball Australia
- Confederation: WBSC Oceania
- WBSC World Rank: 11 ▼1 (31 December 2025)

Olympic Games
- Appearances: 5 (First in 1996)
- Best result: (silver) 2nd (1 time, in 2004)

Women's Softball World Cup
- Appearances: 17 (First in 1965)
- Best result: (gold) 1st (1 time, in 1965)
Medal record
Softball at the Summer Olympics
Representing Australia
Olympic Games
Silver medal – second place	2004 Athens	Team
Bronze medal – third place	1996 Atlanta	Team
Bronze medal – third place	2000 Sydney	Team
Bronze medal – third place	2008 Beijing	Team
World Championship
Gold medal – first place	1965 Melbourne
Silver medal – second place	1998 Fujinomiya
Bronze medal – third place	1974 Stratford
Bronze medal – third place	1982 Taipei
Bronze medal – third place	2006 Beijing
Bronze medal – third place	2014 Haarlem
World Cup of Softball
Silver medal – second place	2009 Oklahoma City
Silver medal – second place	2012 Oklahoma City
Bronze medal – third place	2005 Oklahoma City
Bronze medal – third place	2013 Oklahoma City

The Australia women's national softball team, also known as the Aussie Spirit, is the national softball team of Australia. It is governed by Softball Australia and takes part in international softball competitions. They are one of Australia's most successful women's sporting teams on the world stage, and they have achieved outstanding results over the last 3 decades. Alongside the USA team, the Aussie Spirit are the only other team to medal at all 4 Olympics that softball was included as a sport in the Olympics program. At the inaugural Women's Softball World Championship held in Melbourne, 1965. Australia claimed the first ever title, winning Gold and stamped themselves as a pioneer in the sport.

== Funding ==
The national team has not secured as much funding as male dominated sports in Australia despite having performed better than some and having won major international competitions. The removal of softball from the Olympic programme resulted in the national team getting less funding.

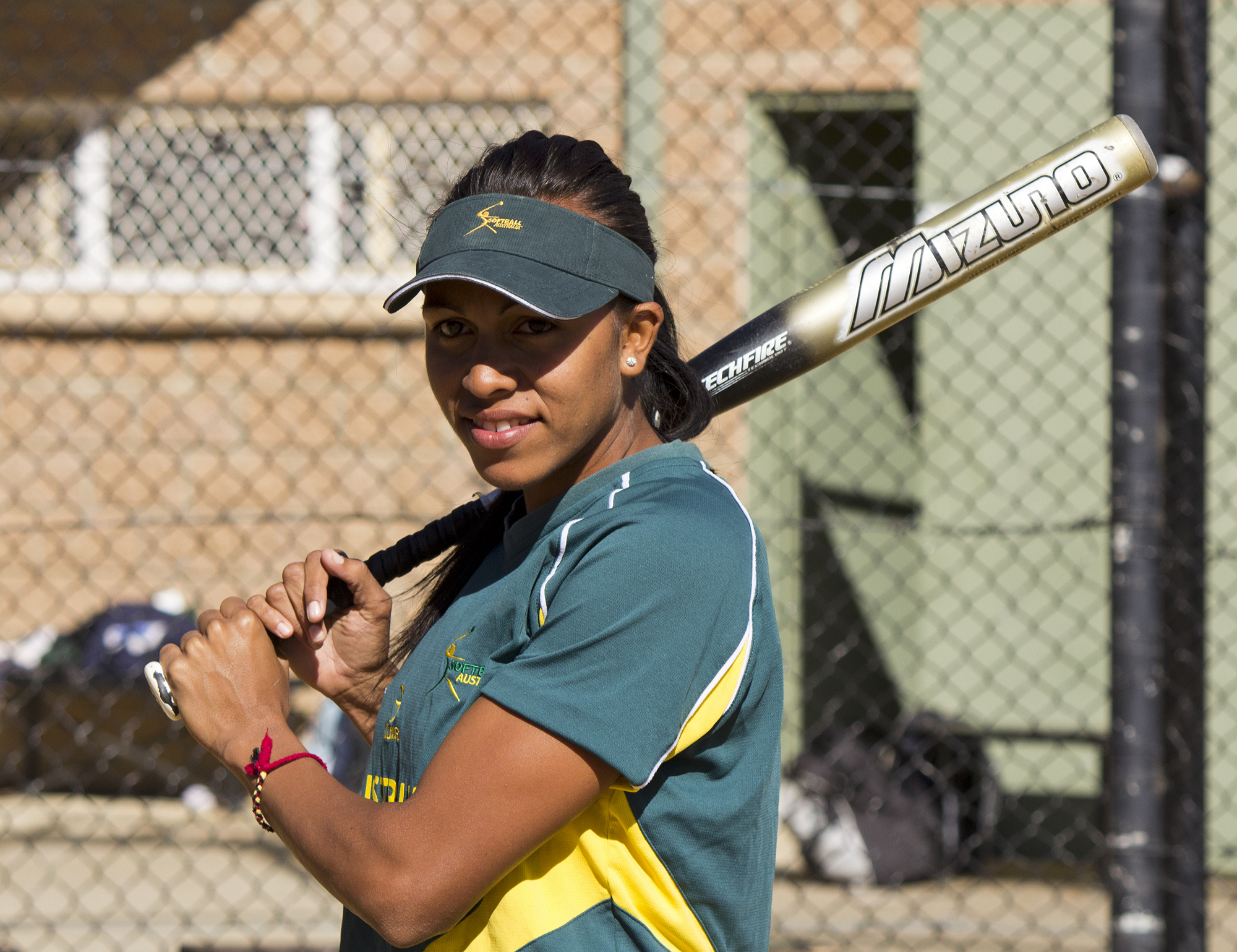

== History ==
Australian women competed in their first international competition in 1949 when they played a series against New Zealand in St Kilda at the St Kilda Cricket Ground. 10,000 people watched the game live. The first international for Australian women took place in 1951 when the Australians toured New Zealand. Australia won both games against the New Zealanders. In 1960, Australia hosted its first international tournament with national teams from Australia, New Zealand and South Africa competing. At the tournament, Australia beat South Africa by a score of 2–1. Australia hosted the event again in 1962, where they beat the New Zealanders in the final 2–1. At the ISF Women's World Championship, Australia finished first in 1965 and second in 1998. The 1965 victory was considered very impressive as they beat the Americans, who invented the game in 1887, to win the championship. Between 1949 and 1967, Australia's senior women's side was undefeated in international play.

== Women's World Championship ==
Australia's women have won the World Championships. Australia was one of five nations to compete at the inaugural ISF Women's World Championship held in Melbourne, Victoria in 1965. At the time Australia hosted the event, the sport was being played by women across the country on the club and school level. At the 1965 Championships, Australia played two games against the United States where they shut them out and allowed them to score no runs. In 1974, Australia was knocked out at the semi-finals stage by the Americans by a score of 6–0. Australia finished second to the United States at the 1998 championship. They lost in a one hit shutout. This was their best finish since the competition's inception. Australia will compete at the 2012 edition.

== Olympics ==
At the highest level they are moving away from the ideals of Olympicism. We've been a casualty of that. I'm not against golf or any other sport being at the Olympics. I think there should be a place for everyone. I just thought we'd been loyal to the Olympic movement and they should have been loyal to us.

— Melanie Roche, four time Olympic medalist in softball

Australia competed at all five Olympic Games where the sport was played. At them, they won three bronze medals and a silver.

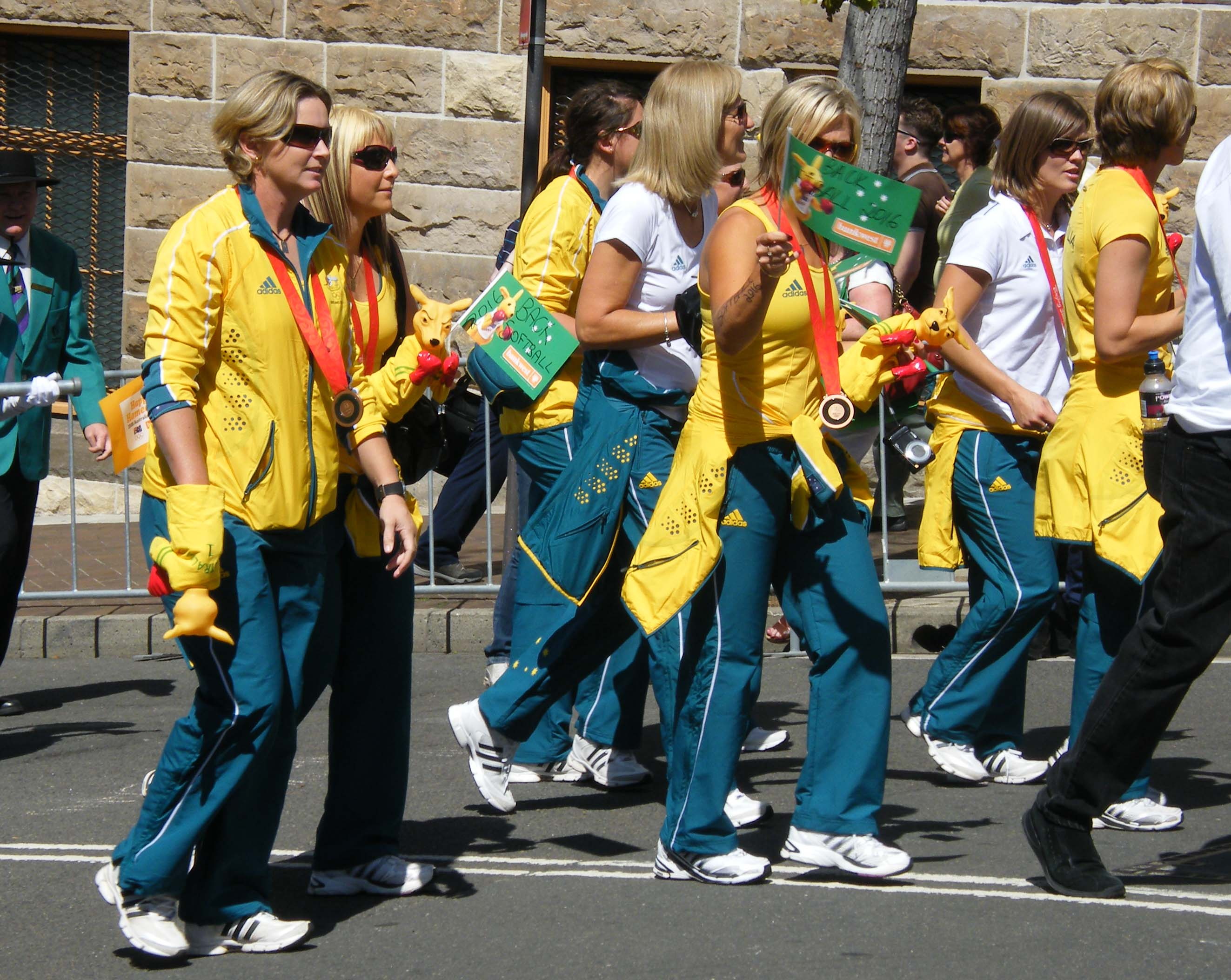
Parade of Olympians – Sydney 2008 – Women's softball team

=== 1996 Olympic Team ===
Going into the 1996 Summer Olympics, Australia were considered one of the favourites to possibly win gold. The Australians beat the Americans at the 1996 Olympics. Australia finished with a bronze medal.

=== 2000 Olympic Team ===
The 2000 Games were played in Sydney. They had to beat the Americans to qualify for the gold medal, but lost 1–0 in a shut out. The Australians beat the Americans during the early part of the competition during pool play.

=== 2004 Olympic Team ===
Australia won a silver medal at the 2004 Summer Olympics in Athens.

=== 2008 Olympic Team ===
Australia earned a bronze medal at the 2008 Summer Games.

=== 2020 Olympic Team ===
Australia achieved a fifth place finish at the 2020 Summer Games in Tokyo.

== Other competitions ==
Majorie Nelson was a Victorian softball player. She was the first softball player to represent any country at four World Series of Softball. She was the Australian captain in 1974 and 1978 and the World Series.

Australia earned a bronze medal at the 2005 World Cup. In 2009, they earned a silver at the World Cup of Softball.

Australia earned a gold medal at the 2005 Canada Cup. They earned a silver in 2008. They earned a bronze in 2011. Australia earned a silver medal at the 2005 Pacific Rim tournament.

== 2020 Olympic roster ==
The roster was released on 1 July 2021.

Softball at the 2020 Summer Olympics – Australia roster
Players		Coaches
Pitchers: 6 Ellen Roberts; 14 Tarni Stepto; 32 Kaia Parnaby; 54 Gabrielle Plain	Catchers: 22 Belinda White; 25 Chelsea Forkin; 65 Taylah Tsitsikronis; Infielders: 2 Clare Warwick; 4 Stacey McManus; 16 Stacey Porter; 31 Rachel Lack; 44 Leah Parry; Outfielders: 1 Jade Wall; 17 Leigh Godfrey; 47 Michelle Cox	Manager: Laing Harrow; Coaches: Nathan Jones; Andrew Kirkpatrick

== Test series ==
In 1962, Australia played a test series against New Zealand in New Zealand. Australia won two out of three games in the test.

In March 2012, the team played a test series against the Japan women's national softball team in Canberra.

== Indigenous representation ==
Stacey Porter was the team's first aboriginal teammate to represent Australia in softball the Olympics. Other aboriginal members of the national team include Vanessa Stokes, Kelly McKellar-Nathan (nee McKellar), Tarni Stepto, Mollie Chilcott, Terri Damager and Janice Blackman.
