= Taylah Tsitsikronis =

Australian softball player

Taylah Tsitsikronis is an Australian female softball Olympian. She was born in Sydney, Australia on 3 July 1994.

== Early life ==
Tsitsikronis was only six years old when she started playing softball at the Penrith Softball Club. She was an active child and needed at outlet for her energies. She realized her Olympic dream when attending a baseball match during the Sydney 2000 Olympic Games when she caught a foul ball.

In 2009 Tsitsikronis was selected for NSW U16 Girls’ National Championship. She won the national title. In 2010 she competed in the same event and this time won the MVP award and a second national title.

In 2011 Tsitsikronis was selected for the U17 Girls’ Nationals. Instead she decided to compete in the U19 Women’s Nationals. She won her third national title and was selected in the Australian U19 team for the 2011 Junior Women’s World Championship.

== Achievements ==
Tsitsikronis won her fourth and fifth national titles at the 2012 and 2013 U19 Women’s Nationals.

She was selected for the NSW Firestars team for the 2013 Gilley’s Shield (Open Women’s National Championship) and won Rookie of the Year.

Tsitsikronis was selected to represent Australia at a 2014 Junior Women’s World Championship, where she was part of a bronze-medal winning team.

Tsitsikronis is a key member of the NSW Firestars team. Since 2014, they have won six Gilley’s Shield titles. Her ability to play multiple positions in the field gives the team great defensive flexibility. She has also become a strong batter.

In 2016, Taylah played in the National Pro Fastpitch league for the Pennsylvania Rebellion team, following this up in 2017 playing for the Chicago Bandits and in 2018 and 2019 for the Australian team.

In 2018, Taylah was selected to play in the National Pro Fastpitch league in the United States with the Aussie Peppers Team, under the tutelage of coach Laing Harrow.

Australia gained a spot in the Olympic field after qualifying through the Softball Asia/Oceania Qualifiers in 2019.

Tsitsikronis was selected for the Australian women's national softball team at the 2020 Summer Olympics. The team came away with one win out of five, beating Italy 1-0 in their second match of the Round Robin and finished fifth overall. Stepto pitched against the United States.

She is a recipient of the New South Wales Institute of Sport Scholarship, which was launched in partnership with Softball Australia and NSW Softball.

Off the pitch, Tsitsikronis is a student of a Bachelor of Policing Practices and Criminal Justice at the Western Sydney University.
