= Jade Wall =

Australian softball player (born 1989)

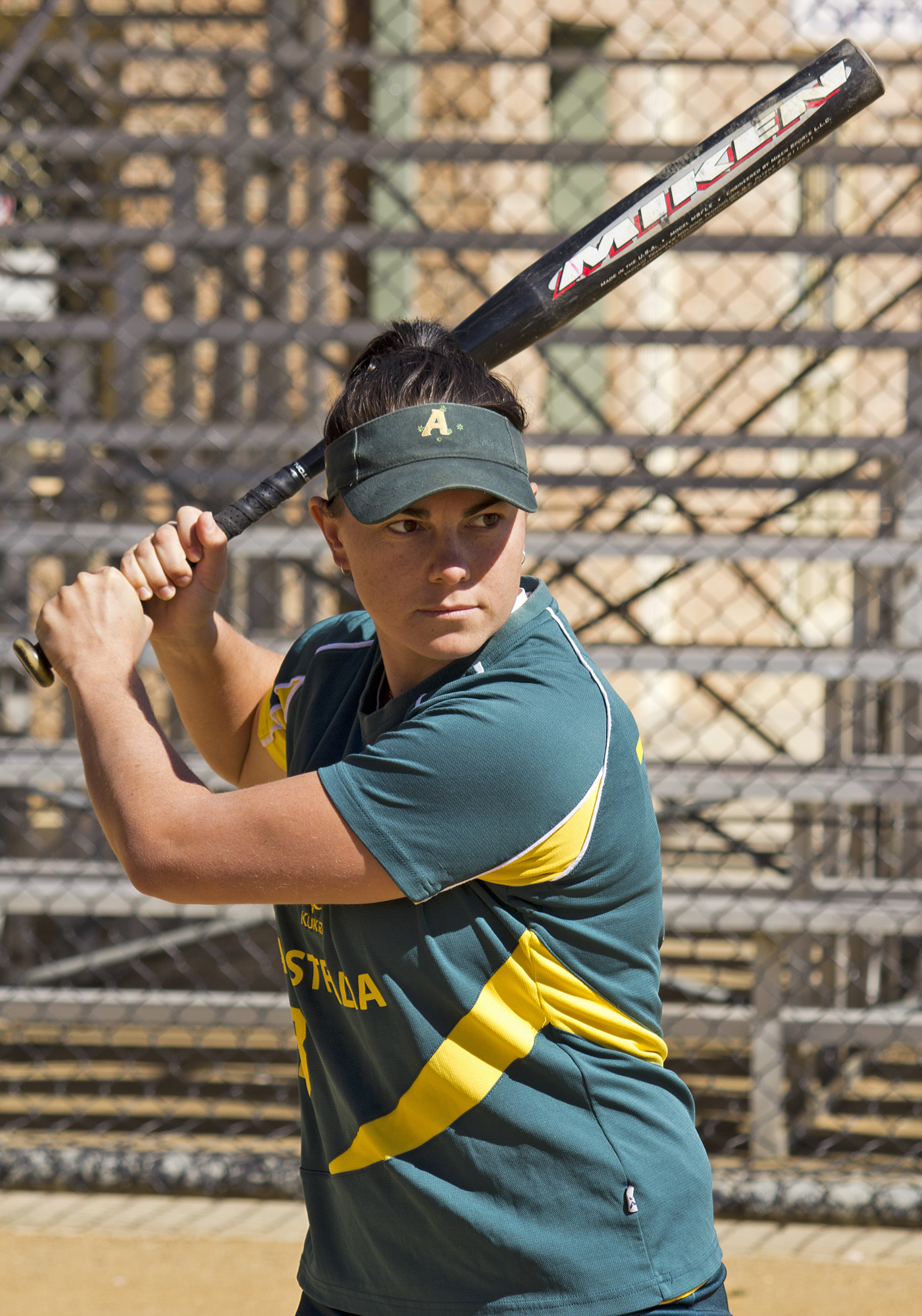
- Wall in March 2012 during a photoshoot

Personal information
- Nickname: Jadeo
- Nationality: Australian
- Born: 20 April 1989 (age 37) Nambour, Queensland

Sport
- Country: Australia
- Sport: Softball
- Event: Women's team

Jade Wall (born 20 April 1989) is an Australian softball player. Wall started playing softball as a nine-year-old. She had a softball scholarship with the Queensland Academy of Sport. She represents Queensland in state competitions and, at one point, was the youngest player on Queensland's open women's team. She has been a member of Australia women's national softball team on the junior and senior level. She is on the short list of players vying to compete at the 2012 ISF XIII Women's World Championships.

== Personal ==
Wall was born on 20 April 1989 in Nambour, Queensland. She lives in Deagon, Queensland. In 2005, she was attending Coomera Anglican College. In 2006, she was in year 12 in 2006. She was living in the Gold Coast region of Queensland in 2008, and in Deagon, Queensland in 2009. Her nickname is Jadeo. When not playing softball, she is a business assistant and surfs as a hobby.

== Softball ==
Wall is an outfielder, and started playing softball when she was a nine-year-old. The first club she played for were the Cheetahs of Hervey Bay. In 2006, she had a softball scholarship with the Queensland Academy of Sport. In 2008, she competed in the Queensland Open Women's State Championships. She has played professional softball in Italy. She currently plays for the Mariners in the Redlands League. Jade Wall also coaches many teams she helped her dad coach the under 15's team for Redcliffe and she has also coached under 17'teams and a large variety of redcliffe rep teams

=== State team ===
Wall represents Queensland at national competitions. She first represented the state on the U16 side. In 2005, as a fifteen-year-old, she was selected to represent Queensland on the state's U19 team. She made the team after tryouts in Townsville, Queensland where 300 girls were trying to make the squad. In 2006, she was the youngest player on Queensland's women's open team. The year, she was also a member of Queensland's U23 team. She was a member of the Queensland team in 2008, and was named the best batter as a member of the U23 side that year. In 2009, she was chosen to represent Queensland on the women's open team. Her team was the points leader going into the final round of the Gilleys Shield in 2009. She was trying to use her performance at the 2009 Gilleys Shield to get a softball scholarship at the Australian Institute of Sport. She again played for the Queensland Heat in 2012 in the Gilleys Shield, a tournament that lasts four months. Her performance in the tournament gained the attention of national selectors who named her to the team to compete in Canberra in March 2012. She was part of the 2012 side that finished third at the Gilleys Shield.

=== Junior national team ===
Wall has represented Australia on a junior level. In 2006, she was a member of Australia's junior U25 national team competed at the International Challenge in Sydney. In 2006, she represented Australia at the Friendship Series in Sydney as a member of Australia's Gold team.

=== Senior national team ===
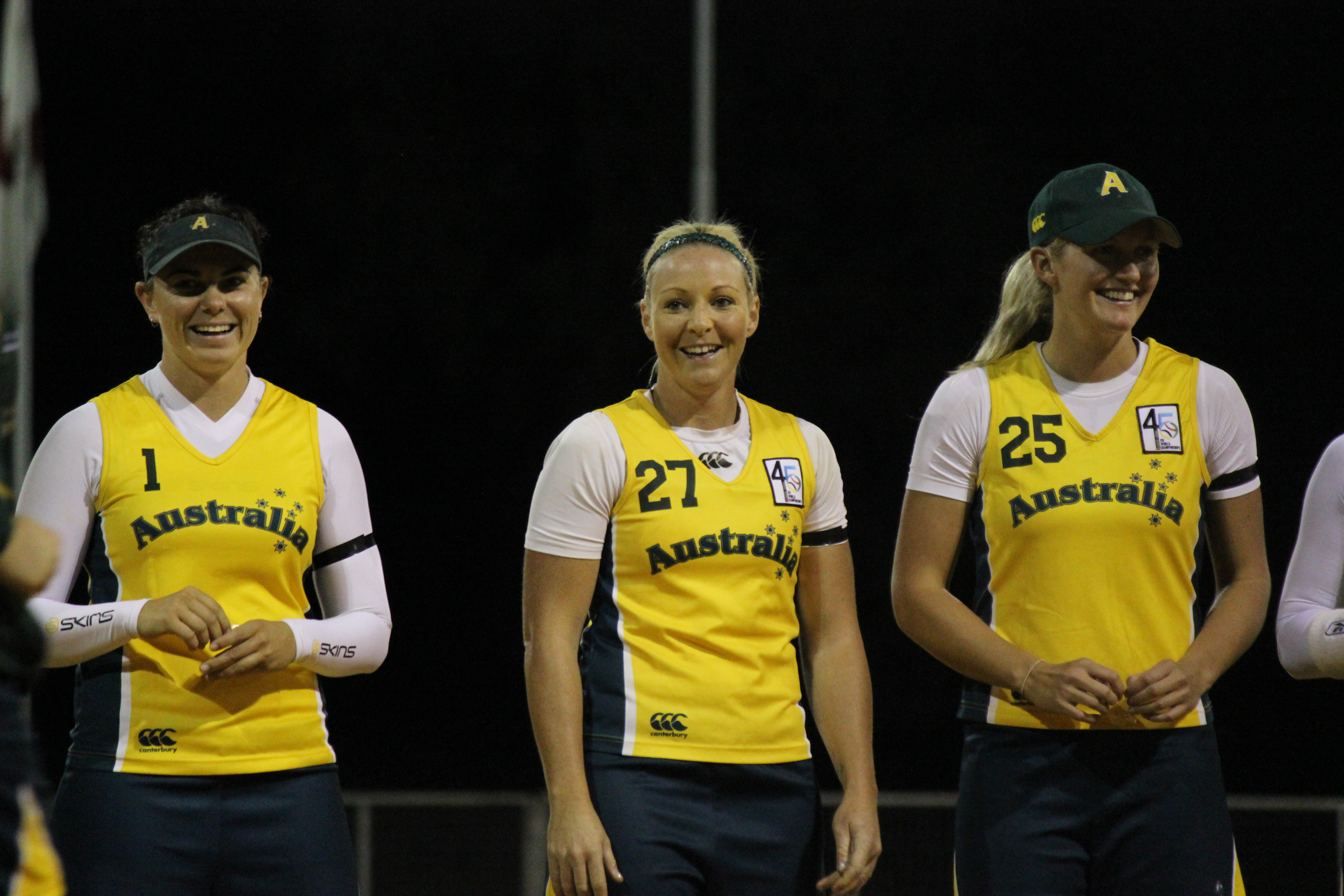
Jade Wall, player number 1, alongside numbers 25 Chelsea Forkin and 27 Jodie Bowering, at a match between Japan and Australia on 21 March 2012.

Wall is a member of Australia women's national softball team. She trained with the senior national team in 2006 before the senior team, whom she did not accompany, went to Beijing and earned a bronze medal at the world softball championships. She toured with the team in Canada and the United States in 2009. She was chosen to be a member of the 2012 national team. and is on the short list of players vying to compete at the 2012 ISF XIII Women's World Championships. She was chosen to participate in a seven-game series against Japan in Canberra in March 2012.

Wall was selected for the Australian women's national softball team at the 2020 Summer Olympics. The team came away with one win out of five, beating Italy 1-0 in their second match of the Round Robin and finished fifth overall. Full details are in Australia at the 2020 Summer Olympics.
