= Chelsea Forkin =

Australian softball and baseball player

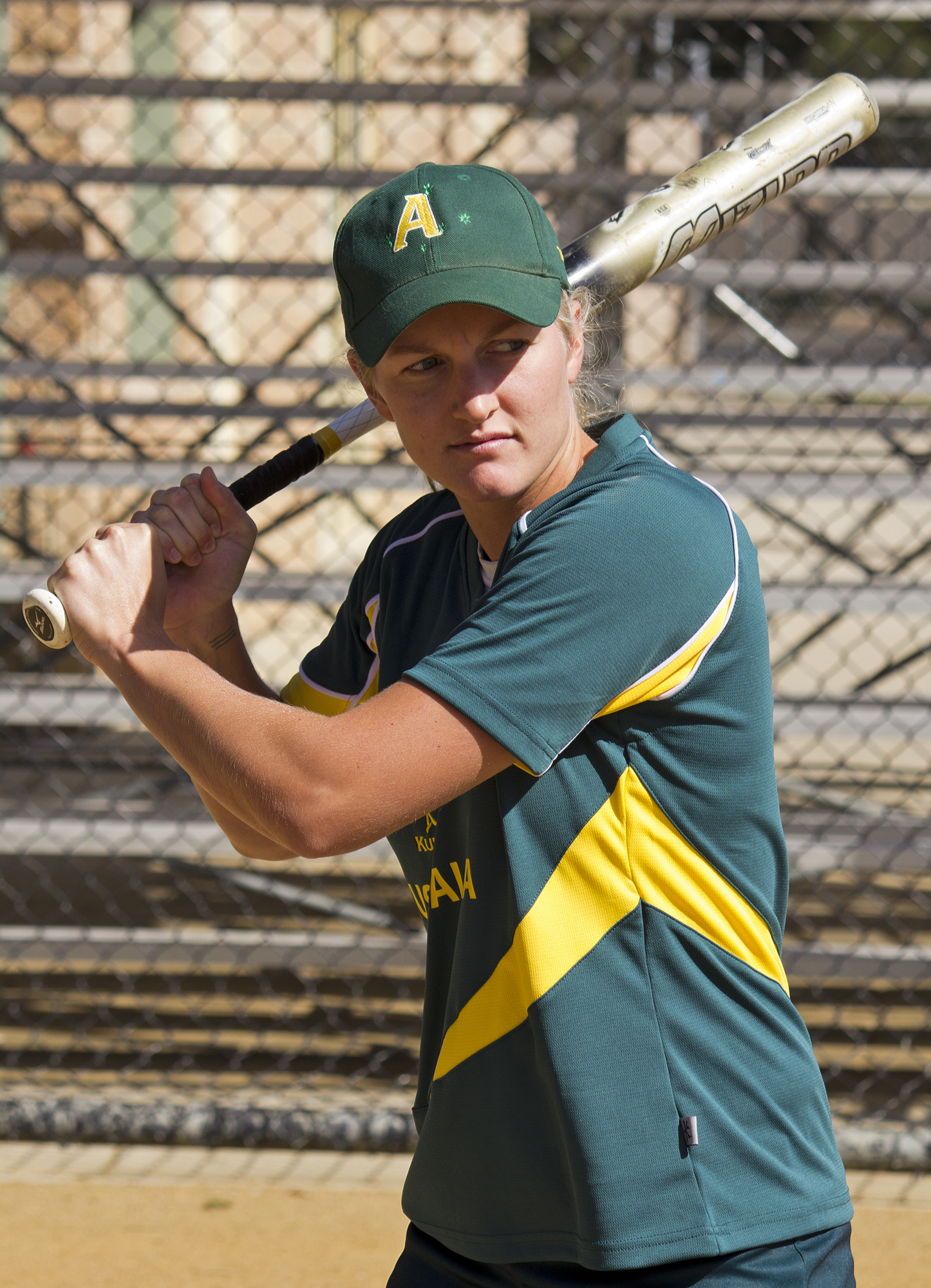
- Forkin in March 2012 during a photoshoot

Personal information
- Born: 14 July 1989 (age 36) Perth, Western Australia

Sport
- Country: Australia
- Sport: Softball, Baseball
- Event: Australian National Team "Aussie Spirit"
- Turned pro: 2016

Achievements and titles
- World finals: 2004 Women's World Series, 2004 Women's Baseball World Cup, 2007 ISF Junior Women's World Championships, 2010, 2012, 2014 ISF Women's World Championships
Medal record
Softball
Representing Australia
ISF Junior Women's World Championships
Bronze medal – third place	2007 Netherlands	Women's Team
ISF Women's World Championships
Bronze medal – third place	2012 Canada	Women's Team
Bronze medal – third place	2014 Netherlands	Women's Team
Canada Cup
Bronze medal – third place	2011 Canada Cup	Women's Team
Silver medal – second place	2013 Canada Cup	Women's Team

Chelsea Forkin (born 14 July 1989) is a softball and baseball player. As a softball player, Chelsea has won 3 Australian National Championship titles with the Western Australian Flames and 1 title with the Queensland Heat.

== Career ==
During her baseball career, she competed at the 2003 Under 14 Australian National Baseball Championships, one of only two girls competing. As a 15 year old, she represented Australia at the 2004 Women's Baseball World Series in Uozu, Japan and the Inaugural Women's World Cup of Baseball in Edmonton, Canada. At the age of 16, Chelsea left the sport of baseball to play softball, where she is a utility player. She went on to represent Australia in softball at the junior and senior national level. With the Junior National Team she competed at the 2007 ISF Junior Women's World Championships winning a Bronze Medal. Her first appearance for the Senior National Team was later that year, in a series against China at Redland City, Queensland. Chelsea's first Senior World Championship appearance was in 2010 in Venezuela, where the Aussie Spirit finished 6th. Chelsea currently has 2 bronze medals from the 2012 ISF XIII Women's World Championships and 2014 ISF Women's World Championships. In 2016, she planned to play for the Dallas Charge in the National Pro Fastpitch League and also represent Australia at the 2016 ISF Women's World Championships in Surrey, Canada.

=== Baseball ===
Forkin started in baseball as a six-year-old playing teeball. She followed the path to baseball and in 2001 by the age of eleven, she played on a boys' team, Melville Braves where she earned the team's Fairest and Best award. Starting off in the junior system, she competed at the 2003 U14 Australian National Baseball Championships in Alice Springs, Northern Territory where she represented Western Australia. She was one of only two girls to participate in the tournament and was Western Australia's first girl ever to be named to the boys' team. She went on to represent Australia at the senior level. As a schoolgirl, she represented Australia at the 2004 World Series and World Cup of Baseball. She eventually left the sport for softball.

=== Softball ===
She plays two positions, catcher and shortstop. She started playing softball as a sixteen-year-old. Within two years, she had made the Australian junior national team. By mid-2007, she had played seven games for the team.

Forkin has represented Australia on the junior national level in softball. In 2007, she was a member of the Australian side that competed at the International Softball Federation Junior Women's World Championships in the Netherlands, where she earned a bronze medal. In 2007, as a member of the U19 national team, she also participated in a softball tour of the Netherlands. She was still with the team in 2008. In 2008, 2009 and 2011, Forkin had a scholarship with and for the Australian Institute of Sport team.

Forkin has represented Western Australia on the national level, she has twice been a member of the Western Flames team that won the national championships. She represented Western Australia at the 2007 Australian U-19 Women's Fastpitch Championship, where her team lost to New South Wales in the finals. She was named the competition's most valuable player and best batter. She has competed at softball on other levels inside Australia. In 2008, she played for a local side at the Northern Territory titles.

==== Senior national team ====
Forkin has played for the Australian senior national team. She was a member of the national team in 2007 and participated in a six-game test series against China in the Redlands. This was her first international competition with the team. In March 2009, she participated in a Brisbane-based training camp. In 2011, she was a member of the Australian side that competed at the World Cup of Softball. She played in the 8–0 loss to the United States. It was her second loss on the day, also having played in a game where Australia lost to Japan. She played in another game at the Cup against the United States where Australia lost 5–2. She was on the Australian side that won a bronze medal at the 2011 Canada Cup. She is a member of the 2012 Australia women's national softball team and is trying to earn a spot to compete at the 2012 ISF XIII Women's World Championships .

Forkin was selected for the Australian women's national softball team at the 2020 Summer Olympics. The team came away with one win out of five, beating Italy 1-0 in their second match of the Round Robin and finished fifth overall. Full details are in Australia at the 2020 Summer Olympics.

=== Recognition ===
In 2011, she was recognised by the Australian Institute of Sport when she was named as having earned a Sport Achievement Award.

=== Personal ===
Forkin was born on 14 July 1989 in Perth, Western Australia and is from Anketell, Western Australia.
