= Belinda White =

Australian softball player (born 1988)

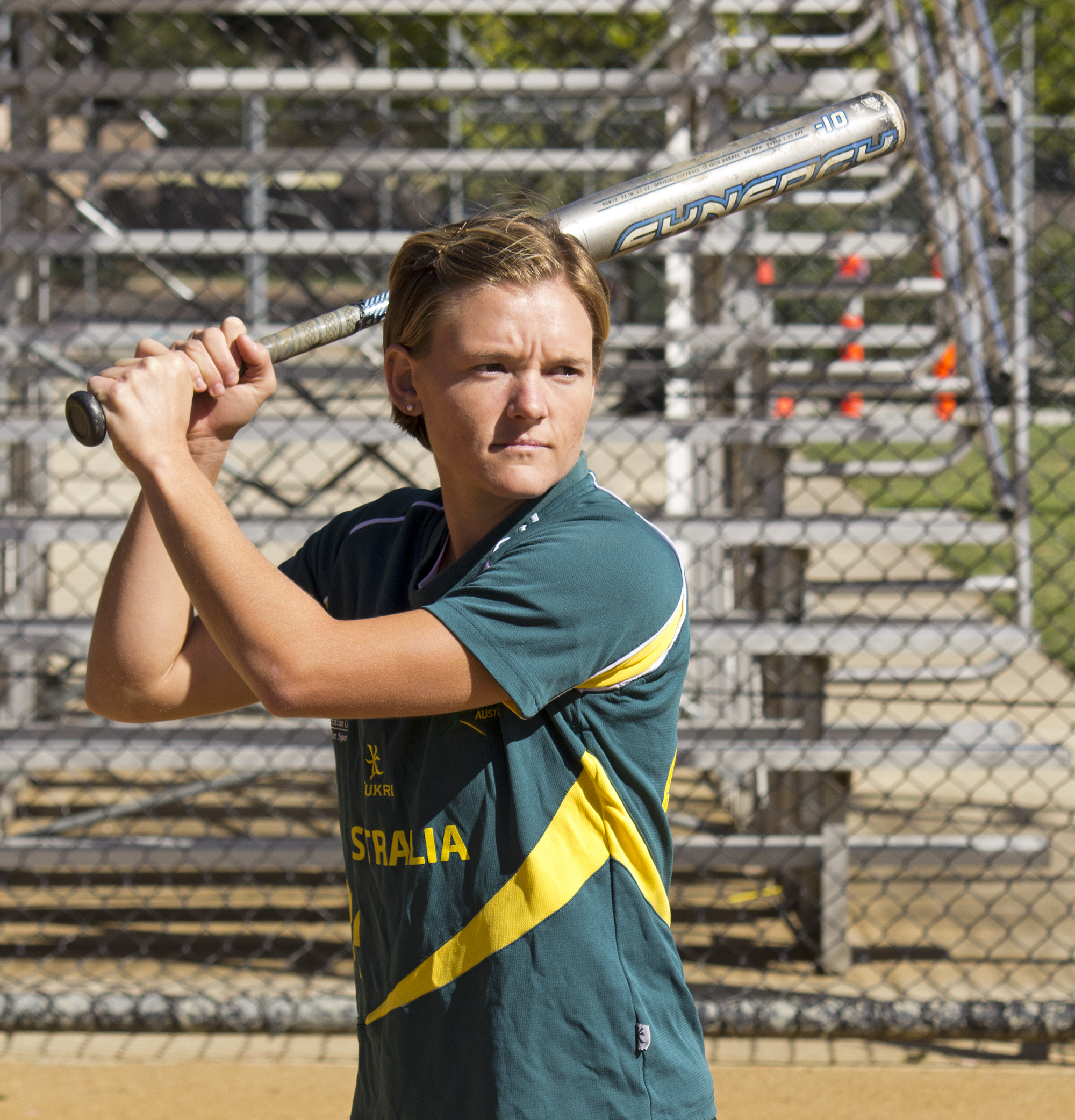
- White in March 2012 during a photoshoot

Personal information
- Nationality: Australian
- Born: 18 July 1988 (age 38)

Sport
- Country: Australia
- Sport: Softball
- Event: Women's team
- College team: Troy University

Belinda White (born 18 July 1988) is a South Australian softball player. She briefly attended Troy University, where she played on the softball team. She plays club softball for the Sturt Falcons and represents South Australia in national competitions. She has held softball scholarships with the Australian Institute of Sport, represented Australia on the junior and senior level, and is working to qualify for the 2012 ISF XIII Women's World Championships.

== Personal ==
White lives in Park Holme, South Australia. She briefly attended Troy University in Alabama. Also plays Premier League for Woodville Hockey Club in Adelaide, South Australia.

== Softball ==
White plays club softball for the South Australia-based Sturt Falcons, having joined the club when she was nine years old. She briefly played with Troy University's softball team.

White was a member of the South Australian side in national competitions, first joining the team in 2005 and was with the team in 2011. She has committed to remaining in South Australia and representing the state despite incentives of higher quality local competition if she moved to another state.

White has represented Australian on the junior national level, and was with the U23 Australian national team in 2007.

White has held a scholarship with and played for the Australian Institute of Sport in 2008 and 2009.

=== Senior national team ===
White has represented Australia on the senior national team. In March 2009, she participated in a Brisbane-based training camp. In 2009, she traveled with a national development team to compete in games in Christchurch, New Zealand. She made her first international appearance with the team in July 2011 in North America, playing in the Oklahoma hosted World Cup VI and the Canadian Open Fastpitch Championships. She was the only woman from South Australia to represent the country at the World Cup despite a thirty-woman strong squad having been named. She is a member of the 2012 Australia women's national softball team and is hoping to secure a sport that will allow her compete at the 2012 ISF XIII Women's World Championships. She was one of two South Australians to play in a January 2012 test series against the New Zealand women's national softball team.

In 2012, White was offered an opportunity to semi-professional softball in the Netherlands, she turned down this opportunity in order to represent Australia in a test series against Japan in Canberra in March. By playing with the national team, she is hoping to secure a spot on the ISF XIII Women's World Championships as the lineup was not finalised as of March 2012. She will be one or two South Australians representing Australia in the Canberra-based series.

White was a member of the Australian team at the 2020 Summer Olympics. The team came away with one win out of five, beating Italy 1–0 in their second match of the Round Robin and finished fifth overall. Full details are in Australia at the 2020 Summer Olympics.
