= Softball at the 2015 Pan American Games – Women's team rosters =

This article shows the rosters of all participating teams at the women's softball tournament at the 2015 Pan American Games in Toronto. Rosters can have a maximum of 15 athletes.

== Brazil ==
Brazil announced their squad on April 14, 2015.

- Mayra Akamine
- Yip Kimberly Chan
- Gabriela dos Santos
- Veronika Fukunishi
- Nilze Higa
- Vivian Morimoto
- Martha Murazawa
- Thais Nagano
- Roseanna Portioli
- Camila Silva
- Regina Chie Someya
- Simone Suetsugu
- Samira Tanaka
- Maria Ueno
- Bárbara Woll

== Canada ==
Canada announced their squad on January 16, 2015.

- Jenna Caira
- Jocelyn Cater
- Larissa Franklin
- Sara Groenewegen
- Megan Gurski
- Karissa Hovinga
- Joey Lye
- Erika Polidori
- Kaleigh Rafter
- Sara Riske
- Jenn Salling
- Megan Timpf
- Logan White
- Natalie Wideman
- Jen Yee

== Dominican Republic ==
The Dominican Republic participated with the following athletes:

- Karina de los Santos
- Dhariana Familia
- Geraldida Féliz
- Yanela Gómez
- Yuderca Matos
- Josefina Mercedes
- Geovanny Núñez
- Luisa Nuñez
- Danelis Ramírez
- Eduarda Rocha
- Lidizeth Soto
- Aureliza Tejada
- María Toribio
- Anabel Ulloa
- Elizabeth Vicioso

== Puerto Rico ==
Puerto Rico's roster consisted of 15 athletes.

- Karla Claudio
- Dayanira Diaz
- Quianna Diaz-Patterson
- Elicia D'Orazio
- Sahvanna Jaquish
- Galis Lozada
- Yairka Moran
- Yahelis Munoz
- Kiara Nazario
- Aleshia Ocasio
- Nicole Osterman
- Gabriela Palacios
- Shemiah Sanchez
- Monica Santos
- Yazmin Torres

== United States ==
The United States announced their squad on January 8, 2015.

- Valerie Arioto
- Ally Carda
- Raven Chavanne
- Amanda Chidester
- Kellie Fox
- Lauren Gibson
- Janelle Lindvall
- Haylie McCleney
- Jessica Moore
- Michelle Moultrie
- Sara Nevins
- Sierra Romero
- Kelsey Stewart
- Janie Takeda
- Jaclyn Traina
