= List of 2020 Summer Olympics medal winners =

The 2020 Summer Olympics were held in Japan from 23 July to 8 August 2021 after being postponed a year by the COVID-19 pandemic. In total, 2,402 medals were won by 2,175 athletes in 339 events at the Games.

== Archery ==
Event	Gold	Silver	Bronze
Men's individual	Mete Gazoz; Turkey	Mauro Nespoli; Italy	Takaharu Furukawa; Japan
Men's team	South Korea; Kim Woo-jin; Oh Jin-hyek; Kim Je-deok	Chinese Taipei; Deng Yu-cheng; Tang Chih-chun; Wei Chun-heng	Japan; Takaharu Furukawa; Yuki Kawata; Hiroki Muto
Women's individual	An San; South Korea	Elena Osipova; ROC	Lucilla Boari; Italy
Women's team	South Korea; An San; Jang Min-hee; Kang Chae-young	ROC; Svetlana Gomboeva; Elena Osipova; Ksenia Perova	Germany; Michelle Kroppen; Charline Schwarz; Lisa Unruh
Mixed team	South Korea; Kim Je-deok; An San	Netherlands; Steve Wijler; Gabriela Schloesser	Mexico; Luis Álvarez; Alejandra Valencia

== Artistic swimming ==
Event	Gold	Silver	Bronze
Duet	Svetlana Kolesnichenko; Svetlana Romashina; ROC	Huang Xuechen; Sun Wenyan; China	Marta Fiedina; Anastasiya Savchuk; Ukraine
Team	ROC; Vlada Chigireva; Marina Goliadkina; Svetlana Kolesnichenko; Polina Komar; Alexandra Patskevich; Svetlana Romashina; Alla Shishkina; Maria Shurochkina	China; Feng Yu; Guo Li; Huang Xuechen; Liang Xinping; Sun Wenyan; Wang Qianyi; Xiao Yanning; Yin Chengxin	Ukraine; Maryna Aleksiiva; Vladyslava Aleksiiva; Marta Fiedina; Kateryna Reznik; Anastasiya Savchuk; Alina Shynkarenko; Kseniya Sydorenko; Yelyzaveta Yakhno

== Athletics ==
=== Men's events ===
Event	Gold	Silver	Bronze
100 metres	Marcell Jacobs; Italy	Fred Kerley; United States	Andre De Grasse; Canada
200 metres	Andre De Grasse; Canada	Kenny Bednarek; United States	Noah Lyles; United States
400 metres	Steven Gardiner; Bahamas	Anthony Zambrano; Colombia	Kirani James; Grenada
800 metres	Emmanuel Korir; Kenya	Ferguson Rotich; Kenya	Patryk Dobek; Poland
1500 metres	Jakob Ingebrigtsen; Norway	Timothy Cheruiyot; Kenya	Josh Kerr; Great Britain
5000 metres	Joshua Cheptegei; Uganda	Mohammed Ahmed; Canada	Paul Chelimo; United States
10,000 metres	Selemon Barega; Ethiopia	Joshua Cheptegei; Uganda	Jacob Kiplimo; Uganda
110 metres hurdles	Hansle Parchment; Jamaica	Grant Holloway; United States	Ronald Levy; Jamaica
400 metres hurdles	Karsten Warholm; Norway	Rai Benjamin; United States	Alison dos Santos; Brazil
3000 metres steeplechase	Soufiane El Bakkali; Morocco	Lamecha Girma; Ethiopia	Benjamin Kigen; Kenya
4 × 100 metres relay	Italy; Lorenzo Patta; Marcell Jacobs; Fausto Desalu; Filippo Tortu	Canada; Aaron Brown; Jerome Blake; Brendon Rodney; Andre De Grasse	China; Tang Xingqiang; Xie Zhenye; Su Bingtian; Wu Zhiqiang
4 × 400 metres relay	United States; Michael Cherry; Michael Norman; Bryce Deadmon; Rai Benjamin; Trevor Stewart; Randolph Ross; Vernon Norwood	Netherlands; Liemarvin Bonevacia; Terrence Agard; Tony van Diepen; Ramsey Angela; Jochem Dobber	Botswana; Isaac Makwala; Baboloki Thebe; Zibane Ngozi; Bayapo Ndori
Marathon	Eliud Kipchoge; Kenya	Abdi Nageeye; Netherlands	Bashir Abdi; Belgium
20 kilometres walk	Massimo Stano; Italy	Koki Ikeda; Japan	Toshikazu Yamanishi; Japan
50 kilometres walk	Dawid Tomala; Poland	Jonathan Hilbert; Germany	Evan Dunfee; Canada
High jump	Gianmarco Tamberi; Italy	Not awarded (as there was a tie for gold)	Maksim Nedasekau; Belarus
High jump	Mutaz Essa Barshim; Qatar	Not awarded (as there was a tie for gold)	Maksim Nedasekau; Belarus
Pole vault	Armand Duplantis; Sweden	Chris Nilsen; United States	Thiago Braz; Brazil
Long jump	Miltiadis Tentoglou; Greece	Juan Miguel Echevarría; Cuba	Maykel Massó; Cuba
Triple jump	Pedro Pichardo; Portugal	Zhu Yaming; China	Hugues Fabrice Zango; Burkina Faso
Shot put	Ryan Crouser; United States	Joe Kovacs; United States	Tom Walsh; New Zealand
Discus throw	Daniel Ståhl; Sweden	Simon Pettersson; Sweden	Lukas Weißhaidinger; Austria
Hammer throw	Wojciech Nowicki; Poland	Eivind Henriksen; Norway	Paweł Fajdek; Poland
Javelin throw	Neeraj Chopra; India	Jakub Vadlejch; Czech Republic	Vítězslav Veselý; Czech Republic
Decathlon	Damian Warner; Canada	Kevin Mayer; France	Ashley Moloney; Australia

=== Women's events ===
Event	Gold	Silver	Bronze
100 metres	Elaine Thompson-Herah; Jamaica	Shelly-Ann Fraser-Pryce; Jamaica	Shericka Jackson; Jamaica
200 metres	Elaine Thompson-Herah; Jamaica	Christine Mboma; Namibia	Gabrielle Thomas; United States
400 metres	Shaunae Miller-Uibo; Bahamas	Marileidy Paulino; Dominican Republic	Allyson Felix; United States
800 metres	Athing Mu; United States	Keely Hodgkinson; Great Britain	Raevyn Rogers; United States
1500 metres	Faith Kipyegon; Kenya	Laura Muir; Great Britain	Sifan Hassan; Netherlands
5000 metres	Sifan Hassan; Netherlands	Hellen Obiri; Kenya	Gudaf Tsegay; Ethiopia
10,000 metres	Sifan Hassan; Netherlands	Kalkidan Gezahegne; Bahrain	Letesenbet Gidey; Ethiopia
100 metres hurdles	Jasmine Camacho-Quinn; Puerto Rico	Kendra Harrison; United States	Megan Tapper; Jamaica
400 metres hurdles	Sydney McLaughlin; United States	Dalilah Muhammad; United States	Femke Bol; Netherlands
3000 metres steeplechase	Peruth Chemutai; Uganda	Courtney Frerichs; United States	Hyvin Jepkemoi; Kenya
4 × 100 metres relay	Jamaica; Briana Williams; Elaine Thompson-Herah; Shelly-Ann Fraser-Pryce; Shericka Jackson; Natasha Morrison; Remona Burchell	United States; Javianne Oliver; Teahna Daniels; Jenna Prandini; Gabrielle Thomas; English Gardner; Aleia Hobbs	Great Britain; Asha Philip; Imani-Lara Lansiquot; Dina Asher-Smith; Daryll Neita
4 × 400 metres relay	United States; Sydney McLaughlin; Allyson Felix; Dalilah Muhammad; Athing Mu; Kendall Ellis; Lynna Irby; Wadeline Jonathas; Kaylin Whitney	Poland; Natalia Kaczmarek; Iga Baumgart-Witan; Małgorzata Hołub-Kowalik; Justyna Święty-Ersetic; Anna Kiełbasińska	Jamaica; Roneisha McGregor; Janieve Russell; Shericka Jackson; Candice McLeod; Junelle Bromfield; Stacey-Ann Williams
Marathon	Peres Jepchirchir; Kenya	Brigid Kosgei; Kenya	Molly Seidel; United States
20 kilometres walk	Antonella Palmisano; Italy	Sandra Arenas; Colombia	Liu Hong; China
High jump	Mariya Lasitskene; ROC	Nicola McDermott; Australia	Yaroslava Mahuchikh; Ukraine
Pole vault	Katie Nageotte; United States	Anzhelika Sidorova; ROC	Holly Bradshaw; Great Britain
Long jump	Malaika Mihambo; Germany	Brittney Reese; United States	Ese Brume; Nigeria
Triple jump	Yulimar Rojas; Venezuela	Patrícia Mamona; Portugal	Ana Peleteiro; Spain
Shot put	Gong Lijiao; China	Raven Saunders; United States	Valerie Adams; New Zealand
Discus throw	Valarie Allman; United States	Kristin Pudenz; Germany	Yaime Pérez; Cuba
Hammer throw	Anita Włodarczyk; Poland	Wang Zheng; China	Malwina Kopron; Poland
Javelin throw	Liu Shiying; China	Maria Andrejczyk; Poland	Kelsey-Lee Barber; Australia
Heptathlon	Nafissatou Thiam; Belgium	Anouk Vetter; Netherlands	Emma Oosterwegel; Netherlands

=== Mixed events ===
Event	Gold	Silver	Bronze
4 × 400 metres relay	Poland; Kajetan Duszyński; Natalia Kaczmarek; Justyna Święty-Ersetic; Karol Zalewski; Dariusz Kowaluk; Iga Baumgart-Witan; Małgorzata Hołub-Kowalik	Dominican Republic; Lidio Andrés Feliz; Marileidy Paulino; Anabel Medina; Alexander Ogando; Luguelín Santos	United States; Kendall Ellis; Vernon Norwood; Trevor Stewart; Kaylin Whitney; Elija Godwin; Lynna Irby; Taylor Manson; Bryce Deadmon

== Badminton ==
Event	Gold	Silver	Bronze
Men's singles	Viktor Axelsen; Denmark	Chen Long; China	Anthony Sinisuka Ginting; Indonesia
Men's doubles	Lee Yang and Wang Chi-lin; Chinese Taipei	Li Junhui and Liu Yuchen; China	Aaron Chia and Soh Wooi Yik; Malaysia
Women's singles	Chen Yufei; China	Tai Tzu-ying; Chinese Taipei	P. V. Sindhu; India
Women's doubles	Greysia Polii and Apriyani Rahayu; Indonesia	Chen Qingchen and Jia Yifan; China	Kim So-yeong and Kong Hee-yong; South Korea
Mixed doubles	Wang Yilyu and Huang Dongping; China	Zheng Siwei and Huang Yaqiong; China	Yuta Watanabe and Arisa Higashino; Japan

== Baseball ==
Event	Gold	Silver	Bronze
Men	Japan; Kōyō Aoyagi; Suguru Iwazaki; Masato Morishita; Hiromi Itoh; Yoshinobu Yamamoto; Masahiro Tanaka; Yasuaki Yamasaki; Ryoji Kuribayashi; Yūdai Ōno; Kodai Senga; Kaima Taira; Ryutaro Umeno; Takuya Kai; Tetsuto Yamada; Sōsuke Genda; Hideto Asamura; Ryosuke Kikuchi; Hayato Sakamoto; Munetaka Murakami; Kensuke Kondo; Yuki Yanagita; Ryoya Kurihara; Masataka Yoshida; Seiya Suzuki	United States; Shane Baz; Anthony Carter; Brandon Dickson; Anthony Gose; Edwin Jackson; Scott Kazmir; Nick Martinez; Scott McGough; David Robertson; Joe Ryan; Ryder Ryan; Simeon Woods Richardson; Tim Federowicz; Mark Kolozsvary; Nick Allen; Eddy Alvarez; Triston Casas; Todd Frazier; Jamie Westbrook; Tyler Austin; Eric Filia; Patrick Kivlehan; Jack López; Bubba Starling	Dominican Republic; Darío Álvarez; Gabriel Arias; Jairo Asencio; Luis Felipe Castillo; Jumbo Díaz; Junior García; Jhan Mariñez; Cristopher Mercedes; Denyi Reyes; Ramón Rosso; Ángel Sánchez; Raúl Valdés; Roldani Baldwin; Charlie Valerio; José Bautista; Juan Francisco; Jeison Guzmán; Erick Mejia; Gustavo Núñez; Emilio Bonifácio; Melky Cabrera; Johan Mieses; Yefri Pérez; Julio Rodríguez

== Basketball ==
Event	Gold	Silver	Bronze
Men	United States; Bam Adebayo; Devin Booker; Kevin Durant; Jerami Grant; Draymond Green; Jrue Holiday; Keldon Johnson; Zach LaVine; Damian Lillard; JaVale McGee; Khris Middleton; Jayson Tatum	France; Andrew Albicy; Nicolas Batum; Petr Cornelie; Nando de Colo; Moustapha Fall; Evan Fournier; Rudy Gobert; Thomas Heurtel; Timothé Luwawu-Cabarrot; Frank Ntilikina; Vincent Poirier; Guerschon Yabusele	Australia; Aron Baynes; Matthew Dellavedova; Dante Exum; Chris Goulding; Josh Green; Joe Ingles; Nick Kay; Jock Landale; Patty Mills; Duop Reath; Nathan Sobey; Matisse Thybulle
Women	United States; Jewell Loyd; Skylar Diggins-Smith; Sue Bird; Ariel Atkins; Chelsea Gray; A'ja Wilson; Breanna Stewart; Napheesa Collier; Diana Taurasi; Sylvia Fowles; Tina Charles; Brittney Griner	Japan; Moeko Nagaoka; Maki Takada; Naho Miyoshi; Rui Machida; Nako Motohashi; Nanaka Todo; Saki Hayashi; Evelyn Mawuli; Saori Miyazaki; Yuki Miyazawa; Himawari Akaho; Monica Okoye	France; Alexia Chartereau; Héléna Ciak; Alix Duchet; Marine Fauthoux; Sandrine Gruda; Marine Johannès; Sarah Michel; Endéné Miyem; Iliana Rupert; Diandra Tchatchouang; Valériane Vukosavljević; Gabby Williams
Men 3x3	Latvia; Agnis Čavars; Edgars Krūmiņš; Kārlis Lasmanis; Nauris Miezis	ROC; Ilia Karpenkov; Kirill Pisklov; Stanislav Sharov; Alexander Zuev	Serbia; Dušan Domović Bulut; Dejan Majstorović; Aleksandar Ratkov; Mihailo Vasić
Women 3x3	United States; Stefanie Dolson; Allisha Gray; Kelsey Plum; Jackie Young	ROC; Evgeniia Frolkina; Olga Frolkina; Yulia Kozik; Anastasia Logunova	China; Wan Jiyuan; Wang Lili; Yang Shuyu; Zhang Zhiting

== Boxing ==
=== Men's events ===
Event	Gold	Silver	Bronze
Flyweight	Galal Yafai; Great Britain	Carlo Paalam; Philippines	Ryomei Tanaka; Japan
Flyweight	Galal Yafai; Great Britain	Carlo Paalam; Philippines	Saken Bibossinov; Kazakhstan
Featherweight	Albert Batyrgaziev; ROC	Duke Ragan; United States	Samuel Takyi; Ghana
Featherweight	Albert Batyrgaziev; ROC	Duke Ragan; United States	Lázaro Álvarez; Cuba
Lightweight	Andy Cruz; Cuba	Keyshawn Davis; United States	Hovhannes Bachkov; Armenia
Lightweight	Andy Cruz; Cuba	Keyshawn Davis; United States	Harry Garside; Australia
Welterweight	Roniel Iglesias; Cuba	Pat McCormack; Great Britain	Andrey Zamkovoy; ROC
Welterweight	Roniel Iglesias; Cuba	Pat McCormack; Great Britain	Aidan Walsh; Ireland
Middleweight	Hebert Conceição; Brazil	Oleksandr Khyzhniak; Ukraine	Eumir Marcial; Philippines
Middleweight	Hebert Conceição; Brazil	Oleksandr Khyzhniak; Ukraine	Gleb Bakshi; ROC
Light heavyweight	Arlen López; Cuba	Benjamin Whittaker; Great Britain	Loren Alfonso; Azerbaijan
Light heavyweight	Arlen López; Cuba	Benjamin Whittaker; Great Britain	Imam Khataev; ROC
Heavyweight	Julio César La Cruz; Cuba	Muslim Gadzhimagomedov; ROC	David Nyika; New Zealand
Heavyweight	Julio César La Cruz; Cuba	Muslim Gadzhimagomedov; ROC	Abner Teixeira; Brazil
Super heavyweight	Bakhodir Jalolov; Uzbekistan	Richard Torrez; United States	Frazer Clarke; Great Britain
Super heavyweight	Bakhodir Jalolov; Uzbekistan	Richard Torrez; United States	Kamshybek Kunkabayev; Kazakhstan

=== Women's events ===
Event	Gold	Silver	Bronze
Flyweight	Stoyka Krasteva; Bulgaria	Buse Naz Çakıroğlu; Turkey	Huang Hsiao-wen; Chinese Taipei
Flyweight	Stoyka Krasteva; Bulgaria	Buse Naz Çakıroğlu; Turkey	Tsukimi Namiki; Japan
Featherweight	Sena Irie; Japan	Nesthy Petecio; Philippines	Karriss Artingstall; Great Britain
Featherweight	Sena Irie; Japan	Nesthy Petecio; Philippines	Irma Testa; Italy
Lightweight	Kellie Harrington; Ireland	Beatriz Ferreira; Brazil	Sudaporn Seesondee; Thailand
Lightweight	Kellie Harrington; Ireland	Beatriz Ferreira; Brazil	Mira Potkonen; Finland
Welterweight	Busenaz Sürmeneli; Turkey	Gu Hong; China	Lovlina Borgohain; India
Welterweight	Busenaz Sürmeneli; Turkey	Gu Hong; China	Oshae Jones; United States
Middleweight	Lauren Price; Great Britain	Li Qian; China	Nouchka Fontijn; Netherlands
Middleweight	Lauren Price; Great Britain	Li Qian; China	Zemfira Magomedalieva; ROC

== Canoeing ==
=== Slalom ===
Event	Gold	Silver	Bronze
Men's C-1	Benjamin Savšek; Slovenia	Lukáš Rohan; Czech Republic	Sideris Tasiadis; Germany
Men's K-1	Jiří Prskavec; Czech Republic	Jakub Grigar; Slovakia	Hannes Aigner; Germany
Women's C-1	Jessica Fox; Australia	Mallory Franklin; Great Britain	Andrea Herzog; Germany
Women's K-1	Ricarda Funk; Germany	Maialen Chourraut; Spain	Jessica Fox; Australia

=== Sprint ===
==== Men's events ====
Event	Gold	Silver	Bronze
C-1 1000 metres	Isaquias Queiroz; Brazil	Liu Hao; China	Serghei Tarnovschi; Moldova
C-2 1000 metres	Serguey Torres and Fernando Jorge; Cuba	Liu Hao and Zheng Pengfei; China	Sebastian Brendel and Tim Hecker; Germany
K-1 200 metres	Sándor Tótka; Hungary	Manfredi Rizza; Italy	Liam Heath; Great Britain
K-1 1000 metres	Bálint Kopasz; Hungary	Ádám Varga; Hungary	Fernando Pimenta; Portugal
K-2 1000 metres	Jean van der Westhuyzen and Thomas Green; Australia	Max Hoff and Jacob Schopf; Germany	Josef Dostál and Radek Šlouf; Czech Republic
K-4 500 metres	Germany; Max Rendschmidt; Ronald Rauhe; Tom Liebscher; Max Lemke	Spain; Saúl Craviotto; Marcus Walz; Carlos Arévalo; Rodrigo Germade	Slovakia; Samuel Baláž; Denis Myšák; Erik Vlček; Adam Botek

==== Women's events ====
Event	Gold	Silver	Bronze
C-1 200 metres	Nevin Harrison; United States	Laurence Vincent Lapointe; Canada	Liudmyla Luzan; Ukraine
C-2 500 metres	Xu Shixiao and Sun Mengya; China	Liudmyla Luzan and Anastasiia Chetverikova; Ukraine	Laurence Vincent Lapointe and Katie Vincent; Canada
K-1 200 metres	Lisa Carrington; New Zealand	Teresa Portela; Spain	Emma Jørgensen; Denmark
K-1 500 metres	Lisa Carrington; New Zealand	Tamara Csipes; Hungary	Emma Jørgensen; Denmark
K-2 500 metres	Lisa Carrington and Caitlin Regal; New Zealand	Karolina Naja and Anna Puławska; Poland	Danuta Kozák and Dóra Bodonyi; Hungary
K-4 500 metres	Hungary; Danuta Kozák; Tamara Csipes; Anna Kárász; Dóra Bodonyi	Belarus; Marharyta Makhneva; Nadzeya Papok; Volha Khudzenka; Maryna Litvinchuk	Poland; Karolina Naja; Anna Puławska; Justyna Iskrzycka; Helena Wiśniewska

== Cycling ==
=== Road cycling ===
Event	Gold	Silver	Bronze
Men's road race	Richard Carapaz; Ecuador	Wout van Aert; Belgium	Tadej Pogačar; Slovenia
Men's time trial	Primož Roglič; Slovenia	Tom Dumoulin; Netherlands	Rohan Dennis; Australia
Women's road race	Anna Kiesenhofer; Austria	Annemiek van Vleuten; Netherlands	Elisa Longo Borghini; Italy
Women's time trial	Annemiek van Vleuten; Netherlands	Marlen Reusser; Switzerland	Anna van der Breggen; Netherlands

=== Track cycling ===
==== Men's events ====
Event	Gold	Silver	Bronze
Keirin	Jason Kenny; Great Britain	Azizulhasni Awang; Malaysia	Harrie Lavreysen; Netherlands
Madison	Lasse Norman Hansen and Michael Mørkøv; Denmark	Ethan Hayter and Matt Walls; Great Britain	Donavan Grondin and Benjamin Thomas; France
Omnium	Matt Walls; Great Britain	Campbell Stewart; New Zealand	Elia Viviani; Italy
Team pursuit	Italy; Simone Consonni; Filippo Ganna; Francesco Lamon; Jonathan Milan	Denmark; Niklas Larsen; Lasse Norman Hansen; Rasmus Pedersen; Frederik Rodenberg	Australia; Leigh Howard; Kelland O'Brien; Luke Plapp; Sam Welsford; Alexander Porter
Sprint	Harrie Lavreysen; Netherlands	Jeffrey Hoogland; Netherlands	Jack Carlin; Great Britain
Team sprint	Netherlands; Jeffrey Hoogland; Harrie Lavreysen; Roy van den Berg; Matthijs Büchli	Great Britain; Jack Carlin; Jason Kenny; Ryan Owens	France; Florian Grengbo; Rayan Helal; Sébastien Vigier

==== Women's events ====
Event	Gold	Silver	Bronze
Keirin	Shanne Braspennincx; Netherlands	Ellesse Andrews; New Zealand	Lauriane Genest; Canada
Madison	Katie Archibald and Laura Kenny; Great Britain	Amalie Dideriksen and Julie Leth; Denmark	Gulnaz Khatuntseva and Maria Novolodskaya; ROC
Omnium	Jennifer Valente; United States	Yumi Kajihara; Japan	Kirsten Wild; Netherlands
Team pursuit	Germany; Franziska Brauße; Lisa Brennauer; Lisa Klein; Mieke Kröger	Great Britain; Katie Archibald; Laura Kenny; Neah Evans; Josie Knight; Elinor Barker	United States; Chloé Dygert; Megan Jastrab; Jennifer Valente; Emma White; Lily Williams
Sprint	Kelsey Mitchell; Canada	Olena Starikova; Ukraine	Lee Wai-sze; Hong Kong
Team sprint	China; Bao Shanju; Zhong Tianshi	Germany; Lea Friedrich; Emma Hinze	ROC; Daria Shmeleva; Anastasia Voynova

=== Mountain biking ===
Event	Gold	Silver	Bronze
Men's	Tom Pidcock; Great Britain	Mathias Flückiger; Switzerland	David Valero; Spain
Women's	Jolanda Neff; Switzerland	Sina Frei; Switzerland	Linda Indergand; Switzerland

=== BMX ===
Event	Gold	Silver	Bronze
Men's race	Niek Kimmann; Netherlands	Kye Whyte; Great Britain	Carlos Ramírez; Colombia
Men's freestyle	Logan Martin; Australia	Daniel Dhers; Venezuela	Declan Brooks; Great Britain
Women's race	Beth Shriever; Great Britain	Mariana Pajón; Colombia	Merel Smulders; Netherlands
Women's freestyle	Charlotte Worthington; Great Britain	Hannah Roberts; United States	Nikita Ducarroz; Switzerland

== Diving ==
=== Men's events ===
Event	Gold	Silver	Bronze
3 m springboard	Xie Siyi; China	Wang Zongyuan; China	Jack Laugher; Great Britain
10 m platform	Cao Yuan; China	Yang Jian; China	Tom Daley; Great Britain
Synchronized 3 m springboard	Xie Siyi and Wang Zongyuan; China	Andrew Capobianco and Michael Hixon; United States	Patrick Hausding and Lars Rüdiger; Germany
Synchronized 10 m platform	Tom Daley and Matty Lee; Great Britain	Cao Yuan and Chen Aisen; China	Aleksandr Bondar and Viktor Minibaev; ROC

=== Women's events ===
Event	Gold	Silver	Bronze
3 m springboard	Shi Tingmao; China	Wang Han; China	Krysta Palmer; United States
10 m platform	Quan Hongchan; China	Chen Yuxi; China	Melissa Wu; Australia
Synchronized 3 m springboard	Shi Tingmao and Wang Han; China	Jennifer Abel and Mélissa Citrini-Beaulieu; Canada	Lena Hentschel and Tina Punzel; Germany
Synchronized 10 m platform	Chen Yuxi and Zhang Jiaqi; China	Delaney Schnell and Jessica Parratto; United States	Gabriela Agúndez and Alejandra Orozco; Mexico

== Equestrian ==
Event	Gold	Silver	Bronze
Individual dressage	Jessica von Bredow-Werndl; Germany	Isabell Werth; Germany	Charlotte Dujardin; Great Britain
Team dressage	Germany; Jessica von Bredow-Werndl; Dorothee Schneider; Isabell Werth	United States; Sabine Schut-Kery; Adrienne Lyle; Steffen Peters	Great Britain; Charlotte Fry; Carl Hester; Charlotte Dujardin
Individual eventing	Julia Krajewski; Germany	Tom McEwen; Great Britain	Andrew Hoy; Australia
Team eventing	Great Britain; Laura Collett; Tom McEwen; Oliver Townend	Australia; Kevin McNab; Andrew Hoy; Shane Rose	France; Nicolas Touzaint; Karim Laghouag; Christopher Six
Individual jumping	Ben Maher; Great Britain	Peder Fredricson; Sweden	Maikel van der Vleuten; Netherlands
Team jumping	Sweden; Henrik von Eckermann; Malin Baryard-Johnsson; Peder Fredricson	United States; Laura Kraut; Jessica Springsteen; McLain Ward	Belgium; Pieter Devos; Jérôme Guery; Grégory Wathelet

== Fencing ==
=== Men's events ===
Event	Gold	Silver	Bronze
Individual épée	Romain Cannone; France	Gergely Siklósi; Hungary	Ihor Reizlin; Ukraine
Team épée	Japan; Koki Kano; Kazuyasu Minobe; Masaru Yamada; Satoru Uyama	ROC; Sergey Bida; Sergey Khodos; Pavel Sukhov; Nikita Glazkov	South Korea; Park Sang-young; Ma Se-geon; Song Jae-ho; Kweon Young-jun
Individual foil	Cheung Ka Long; Hong Kong	Daniele Garozzo; Italy	Alexander Choupenitch; Czech Republic
Team foil	France; Enzo Lefort; Erwann Le Péchoux; Julien Mertine; Maxime Pauty	ROC; Anton Borodachev; Kirill Borodachev; Vladislav Mylnikov; Timur Safin	United States; Race Imboden; Nick Itkin; Alexander Massialas; Gerek Meinhardt
Individual sabre	Áron Szilágyi; Hungary	Luigi Samele; Italy	Kim Jung-hwan; South Korea
Team sabre	South Korea; Oh Sang-uk; Kim Jun-ho; Kim Jung-hwan; Gu Bon-gil	Italy; Luca Curatoli; Luigi Samele; Enrico Berrè; Aldo Montano	Hungary; Áron Szilágyi; András Szatmári; Tamás Decsi; Csanád Gémesi

=== Women's events ===
Event	Gold	Silver	Bronze
Individual épée	Sun Yiwen; China	Ana Maria Popescu; Romania	Katrina Lehis; Estonia
Team épée	Estonia; Julia Beljajeva; Irina Embrich; Erika Kirpu; Katrina Lehis	South Korea; Choi In-jeong; Kang Young-mi; Lee Hye-in; Song Se-ra	Italy; Rossella Fiamingo; Federica Isola; Mara Navarria; Alberta Santuccio
Individual foil	Lee Kiefer; United States	Inna Deriglazova; ROC	Larisa Korobeynikova; ROC
Team foil	ROC; Inna Deriglazova; Larisa Korobeynikova; Marta Martyanova; Adelina Zagidullina	France; Anita Blaze; Astrid Guyart; Pauline Ranvier; Ysaora Thibus	Italy; Martina Batini; Erica Cipressa; Arianna Errigo; Alice Volpi
Individual sabre	Sofia Pozdniakova; ROC	Sofya Velikaya; ROC	Manon Brunet; France
Team sabre	ROC; Olga Nikitina; Sofia Pozdniakova; Sofya Velikaya	France; Sara Balzer; Cécilia Berder; Manon Brunet; Charlotte Lembach	South Korea; Kim Ji-yeon; Yoon Ji-su; Seo Ji-yeon; Choi Soo-yeon

== Field hockey ==
Event	Gold	Silver	Bronze
Men	Belgium; Gauthier Boccard; Tom Boon; Thomas Briels; Cédric Charlier; Félix Denayer; Nicolas De Kerpel; Arthur De Sloover; Sébastien Dockier; John-John Dohmen; Simon Gougnard; Alexander Hendrickx; Antoine Kina; Loïck Luypaert; Augustin Meurmans; Victor Wegnez; Vincent Vanasch; Florent Van Aubel; Arthur Van Doren	Australia; Daniel Beale; Joshua Beltz; Tim Brand; Andrew Charter; Tom Craig; Matt Dawson; Blake Govers; Jeremy Hayward; Tim Howard; Dylan Martin; Trent Mitton; Eddie Ockenden; Flynn Ogilvie; Lachlan Sharp; Joshua Simmonds; Jacob Whetton; Tom Wickham; Aran Zalewski	India; Dilpreet Singh; Rupinder Pal Singh; Surender Kumar; Manpreet Singh; Hardik Singh; Gurjant Singh; Simranjeet Singh; Mandeep Singh; Harmanpreet Singh; Lalit Upadhyay; P. R. Sreejesh; Sumit; Nilakanta Sharma; Shamsher Singh; Varun Kumar; Birendra Lakra; Amit Rohidas; Vivek Prasad
Women	Netherlands; Felice Albers; Eva de Goede; Xan de Waard; Marloes Keetels; Josine Koning; Sanne Koolen; Laurien Leurink; Frédérique Matla; Freeke Moes; Laura Nunnink; Malou Pheninckx; Pien Sanders; Lauren Stam; Margot van Geffen; Stella van Gils; Caia van Maasakker; Maria Verschoor; Lidewij Welten	Argentina; Agustina Albertarrio; Agostina Alonso; Noel Barrionuevo; Valentina Costa Biondi; Emilia Forcherio; Agustina Gorzelany; María José Granatto; Victoria Granatto; Julieta Jankunas; Sofía Maccari; Delfina Merino; Valentina Raposo; Rocío Sánchez Moccia; Micaela Retegui; Victoria Sauze; Belén Succi; Sofía Toccalino; Eugenia Trinchinetti	Great Britain; Giselle Ansley; Grace Balsdon; Amy Costello; Fiona Crackles; Sarah Haycroft; Maddie Hinch; Sarah Jones; Hannah Martin; Shona McCallin; Lily Owsley; Hollie Webb; Isabelle Petter; Ellie Rayer; Sarah Robertson; Anna Toman; Susannah Townsend; Laura Unsworth; Leah Wilkinson

== Football ==
Event	Gold	Silver	Bronze
Men	Brazil; Santos; Gabriel Menino; Diego Carlos; Ricardo Graça; Douglas Luiz; Guilherme Arana; Paulinho; Bruno Guimarães; Matheus Cunha; Richarlison; Antony; Brenno; Dani Alves; Bruno Fuchs; Nino; Abner; Malcom; Matheus Henrique; Reinier Jesus; Claudinho; Gabriel Martinelli; Lucão	Spain; Unai Simón; Óscar Mingueza; Marc Cucurella; Pau Torres; Jesús Vallejo; Martín Zubimendi; Marco Asensio; Mikel Merino; Rafa Mir; Dani Ceballos; Mikel Oyarzabal; Eric García; Álvaro Fernández; Carlos Soler; Jon Moncayola; Pedri; Javi Puado; Óscar Gil; Dani Olmo; Juan Miranda; Bryan Gil; Iván Villar	Mexico; Luis Malagón; Jorge Sánchez; César Montes; Jesús Alberto Angulo; Johan Vásquez; Vladimir Loroña; Luis Romo; Carlos Rodríguez; Henry Martín; Diego Lainez; Alexis Vega; Adrián Mora; Guillermo Ochoa; Érick Aguirre; Uriel Antuna; José Joaquín Esquivel; Sebastián Córdova; Eduardo Aguirre; Ricardo Angulo; Fernando Beltrán; Roberto Alvarado; Sebastián Jurado
Women	Canada; Stephanie Labbé; Allysha Chapman; Kadeisha Buchanan; Shelina Zadorsky; Quinn; Deanne Rose; Julia Grosso; Jayde Riviere; Adriana Leon; Ashley Lawrence; Desiree Scott; Christine Sinclair; Évelyne Viens; Vanessa Gilles; Nichelle Prince; Janine Beckie; Jessie Fleming; Kailen Sheridan; Jordyn Huitema; Sophie Schmidt; Gabrielle Carle; Erin McLeod	Sweden; Hedvig Lindahl; Jonna Andersson; Emma Kullberg; Hanna Glas; Hanna Bennison; Magdalena Eriksson; Madelen Janogy; Lina Hurtig; Kosovare Asllani; Sofia Jakobsson; Stina Blackstenius; Jennifer Falk; Amanda Ilestedt; Nathalie Björn; Olivia Schough; Filippa Angeldal; Caroline Seger; Fridolina Rolfö; Anna Anvegård; Julia Roddar; Rebecka Blomqvist; Zećira Mušović	United States; Alyssa Naeher; Crystal Dunn; Sam Mewis; Becky Sauerbrunn; Kelley O'Hara; Kristie Mewis; Tobin Heath; Julie Ertz; Lindsey Horan; Carli Lloyd; Christen Press; Tierna Davidson; Alex Morgan; Emily Sonnett; Megan Rapinoe; Rose Lavelle; Abby Dahlkemper; Adrianna Franch; Catarina Macario; Casey Krueger; Lynn Williams; Jane Campbell

== Golf ==
Event	Gold	Silver	Bronze
Men's individual	Xander Schauffele; United States	Rory Sabbatini; Slovakia	Pan Cheng-tsung; Chinese Taipei
Women's individual	Nelly Korda; United States	Mone Inami; Japan	Lydia Ko; New Zealand

== Gymnastics ==
=== Artistic gymnastics ===
==== Men's events ====
Event	Gold	Silver	Bronze
Team all-around	ROC; Denis Ablyazin; David Belyavskiy; Artur Dalaloyan; Nikita Nagornyy	Japan; Daiki Hashimoto; Kazuma Kaya; Takeru Kitazono; Wataru Tanigawa	China; Lin Chaopan; Sun Wei; Xiao Ruoteng; Zou Jingyuan
Individual all-around	Daiki Hashimoto; Japan	Xiao Ruoteng; China	Nikita Nagornyy; ROC
Floor exercise	Artem Dolgopyat; Israel	Rayderley Zapata; Spain	Xiao Ruoteng; China
Pommel horse	Max Whitlock; Great Britain	Lee Chih-kai; Chinese Taipei	Kazuma Kaya; Japan
Rings	Liu Yang; China	You Hao; China	Eleftherios Petrounias; Greece
Vault	Shin Jea-hwan; South Korea	Denis Ablyazin; ROC	Artur Davtyan; Armenia
Parallel bars	Zou Jingyuan; China	Lukas Dauser; Germany	Ferhat Arıcan; Turkey
Horizontal bar	Daiki Hashimoto; Japan	Tin Srbić; Croatia	Nikita Nagornyy; ROC

==== Women's events ====
Event	Gold	Silver	Bronze
Team all-around	ROC; Lilia Akhaimova; Viktoria Listunova; Angelina Melnikova; Vladislava Urazova	United States; Simone Biles; Jordan Chiles; Sunisa Lee; Grace McCallum	Great Britain; Jennifer Gadirova; Jessica Gadirova; Alice Kinsella; Amelie Morgan
Individual all-around	Sunisa Lee; United States	Rebeca Andrade; Brazil	Angelina Melnikova; ROC
Vault	Rebeca Andrade; Brazil	MyKayla Skinner; United States	Yeo Seo-jeong; South Korea
Uneven bars	Nina Derwael; Belgium	Anastasia Ilyankova; ROC	Sunisa Lee; United States
Balance beam	Guan Chenchen; China	Tang Xijing; China	Simone Biles; United States
Floor exercise	Jade Carey; United States	Vanessa Ferrari; Italy	Mai Murakami; Japan
Floor exercise	Jade Carey; United States	Vanessa Ferrari; Italy	Angelina Melnikova; ROC

=== Rhythmic gymnastics ===
Event	Gold	Silver	Bronze
Group	Bulgaria; Simona Dyankova; Stefani Kiryakova; Madlen Radukanova; Laura Traets; Erika Zafirova	ROC; Anastasia Bliznyuk; Anastasia Maksimova; Angelina Shkatova; Anastasia Tatareva; Alisa Tishchenko	Italy; Martina Centofanti; Agnese Duranti; Alessia Maurelli; Daniela Mogurean; Martina Santandrea
Individual all-around	Linoy Ashram; Israel	Dina Averina; ROC	Alina Harnasko; Belarus

=== Trampoline ===
Event	Gold	Silver	Bronze
Men's individual	Ivan Litvinovich; Belarus	Dong Dong; China	Dylan Schmidt; New Zealand
Women's individual	Zhu Xueying; China	Liu Lingling; China	Bryony Page; Great Britain

== Handball ==
Event	Gold	Silver	Bronze
Men's tournament	France; Luc Abalo; Hugo Descat; Ludovic Fabregas; Yann Genty; Vincent Gérard; Michaël Guigou; Luka Karabatic; Nikola Karabatić; Romain Lagarde; Kentin Mahé; Dika Mem; Timothey N'Guessan; Valentin Porte; Nedim Remili; Melvyn Richardson; Nicolas Tournat	Denmark; Lasse Andersson; Mathias Gidsel; Jóhan Hansen; Mikkel Hansen; Jacob Holm; Emil Jakobsen; Niklas Landin Jacobsen; Magnus Landin Jacobsen; Mads Mensah Larsen; Kevin Møller; Henrik Møllgaard; Morten Olsen; Magnus Saugstrup; Lasse Svan; Henrik Toft Hansen	Spain; Julen Aguinagalde; Rodrigo Corrales; Alex Dujshebaev; Raúl Entrerríos; Ángel Fernández; Adrià Figueras; Antonio García Robledo; Aleix Gómez; Gedeón Guardiola; Eduardo Gurbindo; Jorge Maqueda; Viran Morros; Gonzalo Pérez de Vargas; Miguel Sánchez-Migallón; Daniel Sarmiento; Ferran Solé
Women's tournament	France; Méline Nocandy; Blandine Dancette; Pauline Coatanea; Chloé Valentini; Allison Pineau; Coralie Lassource; Grâce Zaadi Deuna; Amandine Leynaud; Kalidiatou Niakaté; Cléopatre Darleux; Océane Sercien-Ugolin; Laura Flippes; Béatrice Edwige; Pauletta Foppa; Estelle Nze Minko; Alexandra Lacrabère	ROC; Anna Sedoykina; Polina Kuznetsova; Polina Gorshkova; Daria Dmitrieva; Anna Sen; Anna Vyakhireva; Polina Vedekhina; Vladlena Bobrovnikova; Kseniya Makeyeva; Elena Mikhaylichenko; Olga Fomina; Yekaterina Ilyina; Yulia Managarova; Antonina Skorobogatchenko; Victoriya Kalinina	Norway; Henny Reistad; Veronica Kristiansen; Marit Malm Frafjord; Stine Skogrand; Nora Mørk; Stine Bredal Oftedal; Silje Solberg; Kari Brattset Dale; Katrine Lunde; Marit Røsberg Jacobsen; Camilla Herrem; Sanna Solberg-Isaksen; Kristine Breistøl; Marta Tomac; Vilde Johansen

== Judo ==
=== Men's events ===
Event	Gold	Silver	Bronze
Extra-lightweight (60 kg)	Naohisa Takato; Japan	Yang Yung-wei; Chinese Taipei	Yeldos Smetov; Kazakhstan
Extra-lightweight (60 kg)	Naohisa Takato; Japan	Yang Yung-wei; Chinese Taipei	Luka Mkheidze; France
Half-lightweight (66 kg)	Hifumi Abe; Japan	Vazha Margvelashvili; Georgia	An Ba-ul; South Korea
Half-lightweight (66 kg)	Hifumi Abe; Japan	Vazha Margvelashvili; Georgia	Daniel Cargnin; Brazil
Lightweight (73 kg)	Shohei Ono; Japan	Lasha Shavdatuashvili; Georgia	An Chang-rim; South Korea
Lightweight (73 kg)	Shohei Ono; Japan	Lasha Shavdatuashvili; Georgia	Tsend-Ochiryn Tsogtbaatar; Mongolia
Half-middleweight (81 kg)	Takanori Nagase; Japan	Saeid Mollaei; Mongolia	Shamil Borchashvili; Austria
Half-middleweight (81 kg)	Takanori Nagase; Japan	Saeid Mollaei; Mongolia	Matthias Casse; Belgium
Middleweight (90 kg)	Lasha Bekauri; Georgia	Eduard Trippel; Germany	Davlat Bobonov; Uzbekistan
Middleweight (90 kg)	Lasha Bekauri; Georgia	Eduard Trippel; Germany	Krisztián Tóth; Hungary
Half-heavyweight (100 kg)	Aaron Wolf; Japan	Cho Gu-ham; South Korea	Jorge Fonseca; Portugal
Half-heavyweight (100 kg)	Aaron Wolf; Japan	Cho Gu-ham; South Korea	Niyaz Ilyasov; ROC
Heavyweight (+100 kg)	Lukáš Krpálek; Czech Republic	Guram Tushishvili; Georgia	Teddy Riner; France
Heavyweight (+100 kg)	Lukáš Krpálek; Czech Republic	Guram Tushishvili; Georgia	Tamerlan Bashaev; ROC

=== Women's events ===
Event	Gold	Silver	Bronze
Extra-lightweight (48 kg)	Distria Krasniqi; Kosovo	Funa Tonaki; Japan	Daria Bilodid; Ukraine
Extra-lightweight (48 kg)	Distria Krasniqi; Kosovo	Funa Tonaki; Japan	Mönkhbatyn Urantsetseg; Mongolia
Half-lightweight (52 kg)	Uta Abe; Japan	Amandine Buchard; France	Odette Giuffrida; Italy
Half-lightweight (52 kg)	Uta Abe; Japan	Amandine Buchard; France	Chelsie Giles; Great Britain
Lightweight (57 kg)	Nora Gjakova; Kosovo	Sarah-Léonie Cysique; France	Jessica Klimkait; Canada
Lightweight (57 kg)	Nora Gjakova; Kosovo	Sarah-Léonie Cysique; France	Tsukasa Yoshida; Japan
Half-middleweight (63 kg)	Clarisse Agbegnenou; France	Tina Trstenjak; Slovenia	Maria Centracchio; Italy
Half-middleweight (63 kg)	Clarisse Agbegnenou; France	Tina Trstenjak; Slovenia	Catherine Beauchemin-Pinard; Canada
Middleweight (70 kg)	Chizuru Arai; Japan	Michaela Polleres; Austria	Madina Taimazova; ROC
Middleweight (70 kg)	Chizuru Arai; Japan	Michaela Polleres; Austria	Sanne van Dijke; Netherlands
Half-heavyweight (78 kg)	Shori Hamada; Japan	Madeleine Malonga; France	Anna-Maria Wagner; Germany
Half-heavyweight (78 kg)	Shori Hamada; Japan	Madeleine Malonga; France	Mayra Aguiar; Brazil
Heavyweight (+78 kg)	Akira Sone; Japan	Idalys Ortiz; Cuba	Iryna Kindzerska; Azerbaijan
Heavyweight (+78 kg)	Akira Sone; Japan	Idalys Ortiz; Cuba	Romane Dicko; France

=== Mixed events ===
Event	Gold	Silver	Bronze
Mixed team	France; Clarisse Agbegnenou; Amandine Buchard; Guillaume Chaine; Axel Clerget; Sarah-Léonie Cysique; Romane Dicko; Alexandre Iddir; Kilian Le Blouch; Madeleine Malonga; Margaux Pinot; Teddy Riner	Japan; Hifumi Abe; Uta Abe; Chizuru Arai; Shori Hamada; Hisayoshi Harasawa; Shoichiro Mukai; Takanori Nagase; Shohei Ono; Akira Sone; Miku Tashiro; Aaron Wolf; Tsukasa Yoshida	Germany; Johannes Frey; Karl-Richard Frey; Jasmin Grabowski; Katharina Menz; Dominic Ressel; Giovanna Scoccimarro; Sebastian Seidl; Theresa Stoll; Martyna Trajdos; Eduard Trippel; Anna-Maria Wagner; Igor Wandtke
Mixed team	France; Clarisse Agbegnenou; Amandine Buchard; Guillaume Chaine; Axel Clerget; Sarah-Léonie Cysique; Romane Dicko; Alexandre Iddir; Kilian Le Blouch; Madeleine Malonga; Margaux Pinot; Teddy Riner	Japan; Hifumi Abe; Uta Abe; Chizuru Arai; Shori Hamada; Hisayoshi Harasawa; Shoichiro Mukai; Takanori Nagase; Shohei Ono; Akira Sone; Miku Tashiro; Aaron Wolf; Tsukasa Yoshida	Israel; Tohar Butbul; Raz Hershko; Li Kochman; Inbar Lanir; Sagi Muki; Timna Nelson-Levy; Peter Paltchik; Shira Rishony; Or Sasson; Gili Sharir; Baruch Shmailov

== Karate ==
=== Men's events ===
Event	Gold	Silver	Bronze
Kata	Ryo Kiyuna; Japan	Damián Quintero; Spain	Ariel Torres; United States
Kata	Ryo Kiyuna; Japan	Damián Quintero; Spain	Ali Sofuoğlu; Turkey
67 kg	Steven Da Costa; France	Eray Şamdan; Turkey	Darkhan Assadilov; Kazakhstan
67 kg	Steven Da Costa; France	Eray Şamdan; Turkey	Abdelrahman Al-Masatfa; Jordan
75 kg	Luigi Busà; Italy	Rafael Aghayev; Azerbaijan	Gábor Hárspataki; Hungary
75 kg	Luigi Busà; Italy	Rafael Aghayev; Azerbaijan	Stanislav Horuna; Ukraine
+75 kg	Sajjad Ganjzadeh; Iran	Tareg Hamedi; Saudi Arabia	Ryutaro Araga; Japan
+75 kg	Sajjad Ganjzadeh; Iran	Tareg Hamedi; Saudi Arabia	Uğur Aktaş; Turkey

=== Women's events ===
Event	Gold	Silver	Bronze
Kata	Sandra Sánchez; Spain	Kiyou Shimizu; Japan	Grace Lau; Hong Kong
Kata	Sandra Sánchez; Spain	Kiyou Shimizu; Japan	Viviana Bottaro; Italy
55 kg	Ivet Goranova; Bulgaria	Anzhelika Terliuga; Ukraine	Bettina Plank; Austria
55 kg	Ivet Goranova; Bulgaria	Anzhelika Terliuga; Ukraine	Wen Tzu-yun; Chinese Taipei
61 kg	Jovana Preković; Serbia	Yin Xiaoyan; China	Giana Farouk; Egypt
61 kg	Jovana Preković; Serbia	Yin Xiaoyan; China	Merve Çoban; Turkey
+61 kg	Feryal Abdelaziz; Egypt	Irina Zaretska; Azerbaijan	Gong Li; China
+61 kg	Feryal Abdelaziz; Egypt	Irina Zaretska; Azerbaijan	Sofya Berultseva; Kazakhstan

== Modern pentathlon ==
Event	Gold	Silver	Bronze
Men's	Joe Choong; Great Britain	Ahmed El-Gendy; Egypt	Jun Woong-tae; South Korea
Women's	Kate French; Great Britain	Laura Asadauskaitė; Lithuania	Sarolta Kovács; Hungary

== Rowing ==
=== Men's events ===
Event	Gold	Silver	Bronze
Single sculls	Stefanos Ntouskos; Greece	Kjetil Borch; Norway	Damir Martin; Croatia
Double sculls	Hugo Boucheron and Matthieu Androdias; France	Melvin Twellaar and Stef Broenink; Netherlands	Liu Zhiyu and Zhang Liang; China
Quadruple sculls	Netherlands; Dirk Uittenbogaard; Abe Wiersma; Tone Wieten; Koen Metsemakers	Great Britain; Harry Leask; Angus Groom; Tom Barras; Jack Beaumont	Australia; Jack Cleary; Caleb Antill; Cameron Girdlestone; Luke Letcher
Coxless pair	Martin Sinković and Valent Sinković; Croatia	Marius Cozmiuc and Ciprian Tudosă; Romania	Frederic Vystavel and Joachim Sutton; Denmark
Coxless four	Australia; Alexander Purnell; Spencer Turrin; Jack Hargreaves; Alexander Hill	Romania; Mihăiță Țigănescu; Mugurel Semciuc; Ștefan Berariu; Cosmin Pascari	Italy; Matteo Castaldo; Marco Di Costanzo; Matteo Lodo; Giuseppe Vicino; Bruno Rosetti
Coxed eight	New Zealand; Tom Mackintosh; Hamish Bond; Tom Murray; Michael Brake; Dan Williamson; Phillip Wilson; Shaun Kirkham; Matt Macdonald; Sam Bosworth	Germany; Johannes Weißenfeld; Laurits Follert; Olaf Roggensack; Torben Johannesen; Jakob Schneider; Malte Jakschik; Richard Schmidt; Hannes Ocik; Martin Sauer	Great Britain; Josh Bugajski; Jacob Dawson; Thomas George; Moe Sbihi; Charles Elwes; Oliver Wynne-Griffith; James Rudkin; Thomas Ford; Henry Fieldman
Lightweight double sculls	Fintan McCarthy and Paul O'Donovan; Ireland	Jonathan Rommelmann and Jason Osborne; Germany	Stefano Oppo and Pietro Ruta; Italy

=== Women's events ===
Event	Gold	Silver	Bronze
Single sculls	Emma Twigg; New Zealand	Hanna Prakatsen; ROC	Magdalena Lobnig; Austria
Double sculls	Nicoleta-Ancuța Bodnar and Simona Radiș; Romania	Brooke Donoghue and Hannah Osborne; New Zealand	Roos de Jong and Lisa Scheenaard; Netherlands
Quadruple sculls	China; Chen Yunxia; Zhang Ling; Lü Yang; Cui Xiaotong	Poland; Agnieszka Kobus; Marta Wieliczko; Maria Sajdak; Katarzyna Zillmann	Australia; Ria Thompson; Rowena Meredith; Harriet Hudson; Caitlin Cronin
Coxless pair	Grace Prendergast and Kerri Gowler; New Zealand	Vasilisa Stepanova and Elena Oriabinskaia; ROC	Caileigh Filmer and Hillary Janssens; Canada
Coxless four	Australia; Lucy Stephan; Rosemary Popa; Jessica Morrison; Annabelle McIntyre	Netherlands; Ellen Hogerwerf; Karolien Florijn; Ymkje Clevering; Veronique Meester	Ireland; Aifric Keogh; Eimear Lambe; Fiona Murtagh; Emily Hegarty
Coxed eight	Canada; Susanne Grainger; Kasia Gruchalla-Wesierski; Madison Mailey; Sydney Payne; Andrea Proske; Lisa Roman; Christine Roper; Avalon Wasteneys; Kristen Kit	New Zealand; Ella Greenslade; Emma Dyke; Lucy Spoors; Kelsey Bevan; Grace Prendergast; Kerri Gowler; Beth Ross; Jackie Gowler; Caleb Shepherd	China; Guo Linlin; Ju Rui; Li Jingjing; Miao Tian; Wang Zifeng; Wang Yuwei; Xu Fei; Zhang Min; Zhang Dechang
Lightweight double sculls	Valentina Rodini and Federica Cesarini; Italy	Laura Tarantola and Claire Bové; France	Marieke Keijser and Ilse Paulis; Netherlands

== Rugby sevens ==
Event	Gold	Silver	Bronze
Men's tournament	Fiji; Napolioni Bolaca; Vilimoni Botitu; Meli Derenalagi; Sireli Maqala; Iosefo Masi; Waisea Nacuqu; Kalione Nasoko; Semi Radradra; Aminiasi Tuimaba; Asaeli Tuivuaka; Jerry Tuwai; Josua Vakurunabili; Jiuta Wainiqolo	New Zealand; Kurt Baker; Dylan Collier; Scott Curry; Andrew Knewstubb; Ngarohi McGarvey-Black; Tim Mikkelson; Sione Molia; Etene Nanai-Seturo; Tone Ng Shiu; Amanaki Nicole; William Warbrick; Regan Ware; Joe Webber	Argentina; Santiago Álvarez; Lautaro Bazán; Lucio Cinti; Felipe del Mestre; Rodrigo Etchart; Luciano González; Rodrigo Isgro; Santiago Mare; Ignacio Mendy; Marcos Moneta; Matías Osadczuk; Gastón Revol; Germán Schulz
Women's tournament	New Zealand; Michaela Blyde; Kelly Brazier; Gayle Broughton; Theresa Fitzpatrick; Stacey Fluhler; Sarah Hirini; Shiray Kaka; Tyla Nathan-Wong; Risi Pouri-Lane; Alena Saili; Ruby Tui; Tenika Willison; Portia Woodman	France; Coralie Bertrand; Anne-Cécile Ciofani; Caroline Drouin; Camille Grassineau; Lina Guérin; Fanny Horta; Shannon Izar; Chloé Jacquet; Carla Neisen; Séraphine Okemba; Chloé Pelle; Jade Ulutule	Fiji; Lavena Cavuru; Raijieli Daveua; Sesenieli Donu; Laisana Likuceva; Rusila Nagasau; Ana Naimasi; Alowesi Nakoci; Roela Radiniyavuni; Viniana Riwai; Ana Maria Roqica; Vasiti Solikoviti; Lavenia Tinai; Reapi Ulunisau

== Sailing ==
=== Men's events ===
Event	Gold	Silver	Bronze
Sailboard – RS:X	Kiran Badloe; Netherlands	Thomas Goyard; France	Bi Kun; China
One-person dinghy – Laser	Matthew Wearn; Australia	Tonči Stipanović; Croatia	Hermann Tomasgaard; Norway
One-person heavyweight dinghy – Finn	Giles Scott; Great Britain	Zsombor Berecz; Hungary	Joan Cardona Méndez; Spain
Two-person dinghy – 470	Australia; Mathew Belcher; William Ryan	Sweden; Anton Dahlberg; Fredrik Bergström	Spain; Jordi Xammar; Nicolás Rodríguez
Skiff – 49er	Great Britain; Dylan Fletcher; Stuart Bithell	New Zealand; Peter Burling; Blair Tuke	Germany; Erik Heil; Thomas Plößel

=== Women's events ===
Event	Gold	Silver	Bronze
Sailboard – RS:X	Lu Yunxiu; China	Charline Picon; France	Emma Wilson; Great Britain
One-person dinghy – Laser Radial	Anne-Marie Rindom; Denmark	Josefin Olsson; Sweden	Marit Bouwmeester; Netherlands
Two-person dinghy – 470	Great Britain; Hannah Mills; Eilidh McIntyre	Poland; Agnieszka Skrzypulec; Jolanta Ogar-Hill	France; Camille Lecointre; Aloïse Retornaz
Skiff – 49er FX	Brazil; Martine Grael; Kahena Kunze	Germany; Tina Lutz; Susann Beucke	Netherlands; Annemiek Bekkering; Annette Duetz

=== Mixed events ===
Event	Gold	Silver	Bronze
Multihull – Nacra 17	Italy; Ruggero Tita; Caterina Banti	Great Britain; John Gimson; Anna Burnet	Germany; Paul Kohlhoff; Alica Stuhlemmer

== Shooting ==
=== Men's events ===
Event	Gold	Silver	Bronze
10 metre air pistol	Javad Foroughi; Iran	Damir Mikec; Serbia	Pang Wei; China
25 metre rapid fire pistol	Jean Quiquampoix; France	Leuris Pupo; Cuba	Li Yuehong; China
10 metre air rifle	Will Shaner; United States	Sheng Lihao; China	Yang Haoran; China
50 metre rifle three positions	Zhang Changhong; China	Sergey Kamenskiy; ROC	Milenko Sebić; Serbia
Skeet	Vincent Hancock; United States	Jesper Hansen; Denmark	Abdullah Al-Rashidi; Kuwait
Trap	Jiří Lipták; Czech Republic	David Kostelecký; Czech Republic	Matthew Coward-Holley; Great Britain

=== Women's events ===
Event	Gold	Silver	Bronze
10 metre air pistol	Vitalina Batsarashkina; ROC	Antoaneta Kostadinova; Bulgaria	Jiang Ranxin; China
25 metre pistol	Vitalina Batsarashkina; ROC	Kim Min-jung; South Korea	Xiao Jiaruixuan; China
10 metre air rifle	Yang Qian; China	Anastasiia Galashina; ROC	Nina Christen; Switzerland
50 metre rifle three positions	Nina Christen; Switzerland	Yulia Zykova; ROC	Yulia Karimova; ROC
Skeet	Amber English; United States	Diana Bacosi; Italy	Wei Meng; China
Trap	Zuzana Rehák-Štefečeková; Slovakia	Kayle Browning; United States	Alessandra Perilli; San Marino

=== Mixed events ===
Event	Gold	Silver	Bronze
10 metre air pistol team	China; Jiang Ranxin; Pang Wei	ROC; Vitalina Batsarashkina; Artem Chernousov	Ukraine; Olena Kostevych; Oleh Omelchuk
10 metre air rifle team	China; Yang Qian; Yang Haoran	United States; Mary Tucker; Lucas Kozeniesky	ROC; Yulia Karimova; Sergey Kamenskiy
Trap team	Spain; Alberto Fernández; Fátima Gálvez	San Marino; Gian Marco Berti; Alessandra Perilli	United States; Brian Burrows; Madelynn Bernau

== Skateboarding ==
Event	Gold	Silver	Bronze
Men's park	Keegan Palmer; Australia	Pedro Barros; Brazil	Cory Juneau; United States
Women's park	Sakura Yosozumi; Japan	Kokona Hiraki; Japan	Sky Brown; Great Britain
Men's street	Yuto Horigome; Japan	Kelvin Hoefler; Brazil	Jagger Eaton; United States
Women's street	Momiji Nishiya; Japan	Rayssa Leal; Brazil	Funa Nakayama; Japan

== Sport climbing ==
Event	Gold	Silver	Bronze
Men's combined	Alberto Ginés López; Spain	Nathaniel Coleman; United States	Jakob Schubert; Austria
Women's combined	Janja Garnbret; Slovenia	Miho Nonaka; Japan	Akiyo Noguchi; Japan

== Softball ==
Event	Gold	Silver	Bronze
Women	Japan; Haruka Agatsuma; Mana Atsumi; Yamato Fujita; Miu Goto; Nodoka Harada; Yuka Ichiguchi; Hitomi Kawabata; Nayu Kiyohara; Yukiyo Mine; Sayaka Mori; Minori Naito; Yukiko Ueno; Saki Yamazaki; Eri Yamada; Yu Yamamoto	United States; Ali Aguilar; Monica Abbott; Valerie Arioto; Ally Carda; Amanda Chidester; Rachel Garcia; Haylie McCleney; Michelle Moultrie; Dejah Mulipola; Aubree Munro; Bubba Nickles; Cat Osterman; Jeanie Reed; Delaney Spaulding; Kelsey Stewart	Canada; Jenna Caira; Emma Entzminger; Larissa Franklin; Jennifer Gilbert; Sara Groenewegen; Kelsey Harshman; Victoria Hayward; Danielle Lawrie; Janet Leung; Joey Lye; Erika Polidori; Kaleigh Rafter; Lauren Bay-Regula; Jennifer Salling; Natalie Wideman

== Surfing ==
Event	Gold	Silver	Bronze
Men's shortboard	Ítalo Ferreira; Brazil	Kanoa Igarashi; Japan	Owen Wright; Australia
Women's shortboard	Carissa Moore; United States	Bianca Buitendag; South Africa	Amuro Tsuzuki; Japan

== Swimming ==
=== Men's events ===
Event	Gold	Silver	Bronze
50 m freestyle	Caeleb Dressel; United States	Florent Manaudou; France	Bruno Fratus; Brazil
100 m freestyle	Caeleb Dressel; United States	Kyle Chalmers; Australia	Kliment Kolesnikov; ROC
200 m freestyle	Tom Dean; Great Britain	Duncan Scott; Great Britain	Fernando Scheffer; Brazil
400 m freestyle	Ahmed Hafnaoui; Tunisia	Jack McLoughlin; Australia	Kieran Smith; United States
800 m freestyle	Bobby Finke; United States	Gregorio Paltrinieri; Italy	Mykhailo Romanchuk; Ukraine
1500 m freestyle	Bobby Finke; United States	Mykhailo Romanchuk; Ukraine	Florian Wellbrock; Germany
100 m backstroke	Evgeny Rylov; ROC	Kliment Kolesnikov; ROC	Ryan Murphy; United States
200 m backstroke	Evgeny Rylov; ROC	Ryan Murphy; United States	Luke Greenbank; Great Britain
100 m breaststroke	Adam Peaty; Great Britain	Arno Kamminga; Netherlands	Nicolò Martinenghi; Italy
200 m breaststroke	Zac Stubblety-Cook; Australia	Arno Kamminga; Netherlands	Matti Mattsson; Finland
100 m butterfly	Caeleb Dressel; United States	Kristóf Milák; Hungary	Noè Ponti; Switzerland
200 m butterfly	Kristóf Milák; Hungary	Tomoru Honda; Japan	Federico Burdisso; Italy
200 m individual medley	Wang Shun; China	Duncan Scott; Great Britain	Jérémy Desplanches; Switzerland
400 m individual medley	Chase Kalisz; United States	Jay Litherland; United States	Brendon Smith; Australia
4 × 100 m freestyle relay	United States; Caeleb Dressel; Blake Pieroni; Bowe Becker; Zach Apple; Brooks Curry	Italy; Alessandro Miressi; Thomas Ceccon; Lorenzo Zazzeri; Manuel Frigo; Santo Condorelli	Australia; Matthew Temple; Zac Incerti; Alexander Graham; Kyle Chalmers; Cameron McEvoy
4 × 200 m freestyle relay	Great Britain; Tom Dean; James Guy; Matthew Richards; Duncan Scott; Calum Jarvis	ROC; Martin Malyutin; Ivan Girev; Evgeny Rylov; Mikhail Dovgalyuk; Aleksandr Krasnykh; Mikhail Vekovishchev	Australia; Alexander Graham; Kyle Chalmers; Zac Incerti; Thomas Neill; Mack Horton; Elijah Winnington
4 × 100 m medley relay	United States; Ryan Murphy; Michael Andrew; Caeleb Dressel; Zach Apple; Hunter Armstrong; Blake Pieroni; Tom Shields; Andrew Wilson	Great Britain; Luke Greenbank; Adam Peaty; James Guy; Duncan Scott; James Wilby	Italy; Thomas Ceccon; Nicolò Martinenghi; Federico Burdisso; Alessandro Miressi
10 km open water	Florian Wellbrock; Germany	Kristóf Rasovszky; Hungary	Gregorio Paltrinieri; Italy

=== Women's events ===
Event	Gold	Silver	Bronze
50 m freestyle	Emma McKeon; Australia	Sarah Sjöström; Sweden	Pernille Blume; Denmark
100 m freestyle	Emma McKeon; Australia	Siobhán Haughey; Hong Kong	Cate Campbell; Australia
200 m freestyle	Ariarne Titmus; Australia	Siobhán Haughey; Hong Kong	Penny Oleksiak; Canada
400 m freestyle	Ariarne Titmus; Australia	Katie Ledecky; United States	Li Bingjie; China
800 m freestyle	Katie Ledecky; United States	Ariarne Titmus; Australia	Simona Quadarella; Italy
1500 m freestyle	Katie Ledecky; United States	Erica Sullivan; United States	Sarah Köhler; Germany
100 m backstroke	Kaylee McKeown; Australia	Kylie Masse; Canada	Regan Smith; United States
200 m backstroke	Kaylee McKeown; Australia	Kylie Masse; Canada	Emily Seebohm; Australia
100 m breaststroke	Lydia Jacoby; United States	Tatjana Schoenmaker; South Africa	Lilly King; United States
200 m breaststroke	Tatjana Schoenmaker; South Africa	Lilly King; United States	Annie Lazor; United States
100 m butterfly	Maggie Mac Neil; Canada	Zhang Yufei; China	Emma McKeon; Australia
200 m butterfly	Zhang Yufei; China	Regan Smith; United States	Hali Flickinger; United States
200 m individual medley	Yui Ohashi; Japan	Alexandra Walsh; United States	Kate Douglass; United States
400 m individual medley	Yui Ohashi; Japan	Emma Weyant; United States	Hali Flickinger; United States
4 × 100 m freestyle relay	Australia; Bronte Campbell; Meg Harris; Emma McKeon; Cate Campbell; Mollie O'Callaghan; Madison Wilson	Canada; Kayla Sanchez; Maggie Mac Neil; Rebecca Smith; Penny Oleksiak; Taylor Ruck	United States; Erika Brown; Abbey Weitzeil; Natalie Hinds; Simone Manuel; Olivia Smoliga; Catie DeLoof; Allison Schmitt
4 × 200 m freestyle relay	China; Yang Junxuan; Tang Muhan; Zhang Yufei; Li Bingjie; Zhang Yifan; Dong Jie	United States; Allison Schmitt; Paige Madden; Katie McLaughlin; Katie Ledecky; Bella Sims; Brooke Forde	Australia; Ariarne Titmus; Emma McKeon; Madison Wilson; Leah Neale; Mollie O'Callaghan; Meg Harris; Brianna Throssell; Tamsin Cook
4 × 100 m medley relay	Australia; Kaylee McKeown; Chelsea Hodges; Emma McKeon; Cate Campbell; Emily Seebohm; Brianna Throssell; Mollie O'Callaghan	United States; Regan Smith; Lydia Jacoby; Torri Huske; Abbey Weitzeil; Rhyan White; Lilly King; Claire Curzan; Erika Brown	Canada; Kylie Masse; Sydney Pickrem; Maggie Mac Neil; Penny Oleksiak; Taylor Ruck; Kayla Sanchez
10 km open water	Ana Marcela Cunha; Brazil	Sharon van Rouwendaal; Netherlands	Kareena Lee; Australia

=== Mixed events ===
Event	Gold	Silver	Bronze
4 × 100 m medley relay	Great Britain; Kathleen Dawson; Adam Peaty; James Guy; Anna Hopkin; Freya Anderson	China; Xu Jiayu; Yan Zibei; Zhang Yufei; Yang Junxuan	Australia; Kaylee McKeown; Zac Stubblety-Cook; Matthew Temple; Emma McKeon; Bronte Campbell; Isaac Cooper; Brianna Throssell

== Table tennis ==
Event	Gold	Silver	Bronze
Men's singles	Ma Long; China	Fan Zhendong; China	Dimitrij Ovtcharov; Germany
Men's team	China; Fan Zhendong; Ma Long; Xu Xin	Germany; Dimitrij Ovtcharov; Patrick Franziska; Timo Boll	Japan; Jun Mizutani; Koki Niwa; Tomokazu Harimoto
Women's singles	Chen Meng; China	Sun Yingsha; China	Mima Ito; Japan
Women's team	China; Chen Meng; Sun Yingsha; Wang Manyu	Japan; Mima Ito; Kasumi Ishikawa; Miu Hirano	Hong Kong; Doo Hoi Kem; Lee Ho Ching; Minnie Soo Wai Yam
Mixed doubles	Japan; Jun Mizutani; Mima Ito	China; Xu Xin; Liu Shiwen	Chinese Taipei; Lin Yun-ju; Cheng I-ching

== Taekwondo ==
=== Men's events ===
Event	Gold	Silver	Bronze
Flyweight (58 kg)	Vito Dell'Aquila; Italy	Mohamed Khalil Jendoubi; Tunisia	Jang Jun; South Korea
Flyweight (58 kg)	Vito Dell'Aquila; Italy	Mohamed Khalil Jendoubi; Tunisia	Mikhail Artamonov; ROC
Featherweight (68 kg)	Ulugbek Rashitov; Uzbekistan	Bradly Sinden; Great Britain	Hakan Reçber; Turkey
Featherweight (68 kg)	Ulugbek Rashitov; Uzbekistan	Bradly Sinden; Great Britain	Zhao Shuai; China
Welterweight (80 kg)	Maksim Khramtsov; ROC	Saleh El-Sharabaty; Jordan	Toni Kanaet; Croatia
Welterweight (80 kg)	Maksim Khramtsov; ROC	Saleh El-Sharabaty; Jordan	Seif Eissa; Egypt
Heavyweight (+80 kg)	Vladislav Larin; ROC	Dejan Georgievski; North Macedonia	In Kyo-don; South Korea
Heavyweight (+80 kg)	Vladislav Larin; ROC	Dejan Georgievski; North Macedonia	Rafael Alba; Cuba

=== Women's events ===
Event	Gold	Silver	Bronze
Flyweight (49 kg)	Panipak Wongpattanakit; Thailand	Adriana Cerezo; Spain	Tijana Bogdanović; Serbia
Flyweight (49 kg)	Panipak Wongpattanakit; Thailand	Adriana Cerezo; Spain	Avishag Semberg; Israel
Featherweight (57 kg)	Anastasija Zolotic; United States	Tatiana Minina; ROC	Lo Chia-ling; Chinese Taipei
Featherweight (57 kg)	Anastasija Zolotic; United States	Tatiana Minina; ROC	Hatice Kübra İlgün; Turkey
Welterweight (67 kg)	Matea Jelić; Croatia	Lauren Williams; Great Britain	Ruth Gbagbi; Ivory Coast
Welterweight (67 kg)	Matea Jelić; Croatia	Lauren Williams; Great Britain	Hedaya Malak; Egypt
Heavyweight (+67 kg)	Milica Mandić; Serbia	Lee Da-bin; South Korea	Althéa Laurin; France
Heavyweight (+67 kg)	Milica Mandić; Serbia	Lee Da-bin; South Korea	Bianca Walkden; Great Britain

== Tennis ==
Event	Gold	Silver	Bronze
Men's singles	Alexander Zverev; Germany	Karen Khachanov; ROC	Pablo Carreño Busta; Spain
Men's doubles	Nikola Mektić and Mate Pavić; Croatia	Marin Čilić and Ivan Dodig; Croatia	Marcus Daniell and Michael Venus; New Zealand
Women's singles	Belinda Bencic; Switzerland	Markéta Vondroušová; Czech Republic	Elina Svitolina; Ukraine
Women's doubles	Barbora Krejčíková and Kateřina Siniaková; Czech Republic	Belinda Bencic and Viktorija Golubic; Switzerland	Laura Pigossi and Luisa Stefani; Brazil
Mixed doubles	Anastasia Pavlyuchenkova and Andrey Rublev; ROC	Elena Vesnina and Aslan Karatsev; ROC	Ashleigh Barty and John Peers; Australia

== Triathlon ==
Event	Gold	Silver	Bronze
Men's individual	Kristian Blummenfelt; Norway	Alex Yee; Great Britain	Hayden Wilde; New Zealand
Women's individual	Flora Duffy; Bermuda	Georgia Taylor-Brown; Great Britain	Katie Zaferes; United States
Mixed relay	Great Britain; Jess Learmonth; Jonny Brownlee; Georgia Taylor-Brown; Alex Yee	United States; Katie Zaferes; Kevin McDowell; Taylor Knibb; Morgan Pearson	France; Léonie Périault; Dorian Coninx; Cassandre Beaugrand; Vincent Luis

== Volleyball ==
=== Indoor volleyball ===
Event	Gold	Silver	Bronze
Men's indoor	France; Barthélémy Chinenyeze; Jenia Grebennikov (L); Jean Patry; Benjamin Toniutti (c); Kévin Tillie; Earvin N'Gapeth; Antoine Brizard; Stéphen Boyer; Nicolas Le Goff; Daryl Bultor; Trévor Clévenot; Yacine Louati	ROC; Yaroslav Podlesnykh; Artem Volvich; Dmitry Volkov; Ivan Iakovlev; Denis Bogdan; Pavel Pankov; Viktor Poletaev; Maksim Mikhaylov; Egor Kliuka; Ilyas Kurkaev; Igor Kobzar (c); Valentin Golubev (L)	Argentina; Martín Ramos; Federico Pereyra; Cristian Poglajen; Facundo Conte; Agustín Loser; Santiago Danani (L); Sebastián Solé; Bruno Lima; Ezequiel Palacios; Luciano De Cecco (c); Nicolás Méndez; Matías Sánchez
Women's indoor	United States; Micha Hancock; Jordyn Poulter; Justine Wong-Orantes (L); Jordan Larson (c); Annie Drews; Jordan Thompson; Michelle Bartsch-Hackley; Kim Hill; Foluke Akinradewo; Haleigh Washington; Kelsey Robinson; Chiaka Ogbogu	Brazil; Carol Gattaz; Rosamaria Montibeller; Macris Carneiro; Roberta Ratzke; Gabriela Guimarães; Tandara Caixeta; Natália Pereira (c); Ana Carolina da Silva; Fernanda Garay; Ana Cristina de Souza; Camila Brait (L); Ana Beatriz Corrêa	Serbia; Bianka Buša; Mina Popović; Slađana Mirković; Brankica Mihajlović; Maja Ognjenović (c); Ana Bjelica; Maja Aleksić; Milena Rašić; Silvija Popović (L); Tijana Bošković; Bojana Milenković; Jelena Blagojević

=== Beach volleyball ===
Event	Gold	Silver	Bronze
Men's beach	Anders Mol and Christian Sørum; Norway	Viacheslav Krasilnikov and Oleg Stoyanovskiy; ROC	Ahmed Tijan and Cherif Younousse; Qatar
Women's beach	Alix Klineman and April Ross; United States	Mariafe Artacho del Solar and Taliqua Clancy; Australia	Joana Heidrich and Anouk Vergé-Dépré; Switzerland

== Water polo ==
Event	Gold	Silver	Bronze
Men	Serbia; Gojko Pijetlović; Dušan Mandić; Nikola Dedović; Sava Ranđelović; Strahinja Rašović; Duško Pijetlović; Đorđe Lazić; Milan Aleksić; Nikola Jakšić; Filip Filipović; Andrija Prlainović; Stefan Mitrović; Branislav Mitrović	Greece; Emmanouil Zerdevas; Konstantinos Genidounias; Dimitrios Skoumpakis; Marios Kapotsis; Ioannis Fountoulis; Alexandros Papanastasiou; Georgios Dervisis; Stylianos Argyropoulos; Konstantinos Mourikis; Christodoulos Kolomvos; Konstantinos Gkiouvetsis; Angelos Vlachopoulos; Konstantinos Galanidis	Hungary; Dániel Angyal; Balázs Erdélyi; Balázs Hárai; Norbert Hosnyánszky; Szilárd Jansik; Krisztián Manhercz; Tamás Mezei; Viktor Nagy; Mátyás Pásztor; Márton Vámos; Dénes Varga; Soma Vogel; Gergő Zalánki
Women	United States; Rachel Fattal; Aria Fischer; Makenzie Fischer; Kaleigh Gilchrist; Stephania Haralabidis; Paige Hauschild; Ashleigh Johnson; Amanda Longan; Maddie Musselman; Jamie Neushul; Melissa Seidemann; Maggie Steffens; Alys Williams	Spain; Marta Bach; Anni Espar; Clara Espar; Laura Ester; Judith Forca; Maica García; Irene González; Paula Leitón; Beatriz Ortiz; Pili Peña; Elena Ruiz; Elena Sánchez; Roser Tarragó	Hungary; Krisztina Garda; Edina Gangl; Gréta Gurisatti; Anikó Gyöngyössy; Anna Illés; Rita Keszthelyi; Dóra Leimeter; Alda Magyari; Rebecca Parkes; Nataša Rybanská; Dorottya Szilágyi; Gabriella Szűcs; Vanda Vályi

== Weightlifting ==
=== Men's events ===
Event	Gold	Silver	Bronze
61 kg	Li Fabin; China	Eko Yuli Irawan; Indonesia	Igor Son; Kazakhstan
67 kg	Chen Lijun; China	Luis Javier Mosquera; Colombia	Mirko Zanni; Italy
73 kg	Shi Zhiyong; China	Julio Mayora; Venezuela	Rahmat Erwin Abdullah; Indonesia
81 kg	Lü Xiaojun; China	Zacarías Bonnat; Dominican Republic	Antonino Pizzolato; Italy
96 kg	Fares El-Bakh; Qatar	Keydomar Vallenilla; Venezuela	Anton Pliesnoi; Georgia
109 kg	Akbar Djuraev; Uzbekistan	Simon Martirosyan; Armenia	Artūrs Plēsnieks; Latvia
109+ kg	Lasha Talakhadze; Georgia	Ali Davoudi; Iran	Man Asaad; Syria

=== Women's events ===
Event	Gold	Silver	Bronze
49 kg	Hou Zhihui; China	Saikhom Mirabai Chanu; India	Windy Cantika Aisah; Indonesia
55 kg	Hidilyn Diaz; Philippines	Liao Qiuyun; China	Zulfiya Chinshanlo; Kazakhstan
59 kg	Kuo Hsing-chun; Chinese Taipei	Polina Guryeva; Turkmenistan	Mikiko Ando; Japan
64 kg	Maude Charron; Canada	Giorgia Bordignon; Italy	Chen Wen-huei; Chinese Taipei
76 kg	Neisi Dájomes; Ecuador	Katherine Nye; United States	Aremi Fuentes; Mexico
87 kg	Wang Zhouyu; China	Tamara Salazar; Ecuador	Crismery Santana; Dominican Republic
87+ kg	Li Wenwen; China	Emily Campbell; Great Britain	Sarah Robles; United States

== Wrestling ==
=== Men's freestyle ===
Event	Gold	Silver	Bronze
57 kg	Zaur Uguev; ROC	Ravi Kumar; India	Nurislam Sanayev; Kazakhstan
57 kg	Zaur Uguev; ROC	Ravi Kumar; India	Thomas Gilman; United States
65 kg	Takuto Otoguro; Japan	Haji Aliyev; Azerbaijan	Gadzhimurad Rashidov; ROC
65 kg	Takuto Otoguro; Japan	Haji Aliyev; Azerbaijan	Bajrang Punia; India
74 kg	Zaurbek Sidakov; ROC	Mahamedkhabib Kadzimahamedau; Belarus	Kyle Dake; United States
74 kg	Zaurbek Sidakov; ROC	Mahamedkhabib Kadzimahamedau; Belarus	Bekzod Abdurakhmonov; Uzbekistan
86 kg	David Taylor; United States	Hassan Yazdani; Iran	Artur Naifonov; ROC
86 kg	David Taylor; United States	Hassan Yazdani; Iran	Myles Amine; San Marino
97 kg	Abdulrashid Sadulaev; ROC	Kyle Snyder; United States	Reineris Salas; Cuba
97 kg	Abdulrashid Sadulaev; ROC	Kyle Snyder; United States	Abraham Conyedo; Italy
125 kg	Gable Steveson; United States	Geno Petriashvili; Georgia	Amir Hossein Zare; Iran
125 kg	Gable Steveson; United States	Geno Petriashvili; Georgia	Taha Akgül; Turkey

=== Men's Greco-Roman ===
Event	Gold	Silver	Bronze
60 kg	Luis Orta; Cuba	Kenichiro Fumita; Japan	Walihan Sailike; China
60 kg	Luis Orta; Cuba	Kenichiro Fumita; Japan	Sergey Emelin; ROC
67 kg	Mohammad Reza Geraei; Iran	Parviz Nasibov; Ukraine	Frank Stäbler; Germany
67 kg	Mohammad Reza Geraei; Iran	Parviz Nasibov; Ukraine	Mohamed Ibrahim El-Sayed; Egypt
77 kg	Tamás Lőrincz; Hungary	Akzhol Makhmudov; Kyrgyzstan	Shohei Yabiku; Japan
77 kg	Tamás Lőrincz; Hungary	Akzhol Makhmudov; Kyrgyzstan	Rafig Huseynov; Azerbaijan
87 kg	Zhan Beleniuk; Ukraine	Viktor Lőrincz; Hungary	Denis Kudla; Germany
87 kg	Zhan Beleniuk; Ukraine	Viktor Lőrincz; Hungary	Ivan Huklek; Croatia
97 kg	Musa Evloev; ROC	Artur Aleksanyan; Armenia	Tadeusz Michalik; Poland
97 kg	Musa Evloev; ROC	Artur Aleksanyan; Armenia	Mohammad Hadi Saravi; Iran
130 kg	Mijaín López; Cuba	Iakob Kajaia; Georgia	Rıza Kayaalp; Turkey
130 kg	Mijaín López; Cuba	Iakob Kajaia; Georgia	Sergey Semenov; ROC

=== Women's freestyle ===
Event	Gold	Silver	Bronze
50 kg	Yui Susaki; Japan	Sun Yanan; China	Mariya Stadnik; Azerbaijan
50 kg	Yui Susaki; Japan	Sun Yanan; China	Sarah Hildebrandt; United States
53 kg	Mayu Mukaida; Japan	Pang Qianyu; China	Vanesa Kaladzinskaya; Belarus
53 kg	Mayu Mukaida; Japan	Pang Qianyu; China	Bat-Ochiryn Bolortuyaa; Mongolia
57 kg	Risako Kawai; Japan	Iryna Kurachkina; Belarus	Helen Maroulis; United States
57 kg	Risako Kawai; Japan	Iryna Kurachkina; Belarus	Evelina Nikolova; Bulgaria
62 kg	Yukako Kawai; Japan	Aisuluu Tynybekova; Kyrgyzstan	Iryna Koliadenko; Ukraine
62 kg	Yukako Kawai; Japan	Aisuluu Tynybekova; Kyrgyzstan	Taybe Yusein; Bulgaria
68 kg	Tamyra Mensah-Stock; United States	Blessing Oborududu; Nigeria	Alla Cherkasova; Ukraine
68 kg	Tamyra Mensah-Stock; United States	Blessing Oborududu; Nigeria	Meerim Zhumanazarova; Kyrgyzstan
76 kg	Aline Rotter-Focken; Germany	Adeline Gray; United States	Yasemin Adar; Turkey
76 kg	Aline Rotter-Focken; Germany	Adeline Gray; United States	Zhou Qian; China

== Changes in medals ==
On 18 February 2022, British runner CJ Ujah was found to have tested positive for banned substances (ostarine and S-23). The British men's 4 × 100 metres relay silver medal was stripped, with Canada being promoted to silver and China taking bronze.

== See also ==
- 2020 Summer Olympics medal table
