= Softball at the 2015 Pan American Games =

- Softball pictogram for the games
- Venues: Pan Am Ball Park
- Dates: July 12–26
- No. of events: 2 (1 men, 1 women)
- Competitors: 181 from 9 nations

Softball competitions at the 2015 Pan American Games in Toronto was held from July 12 to 26 at the Pan Am Ball Park, in Ajax, Ontario. Men's softball returned to the Pan American Games sports program after last being competed in 2003. A total of six men and women's teams competed in each tournament respectively.

== Competition schedule ==
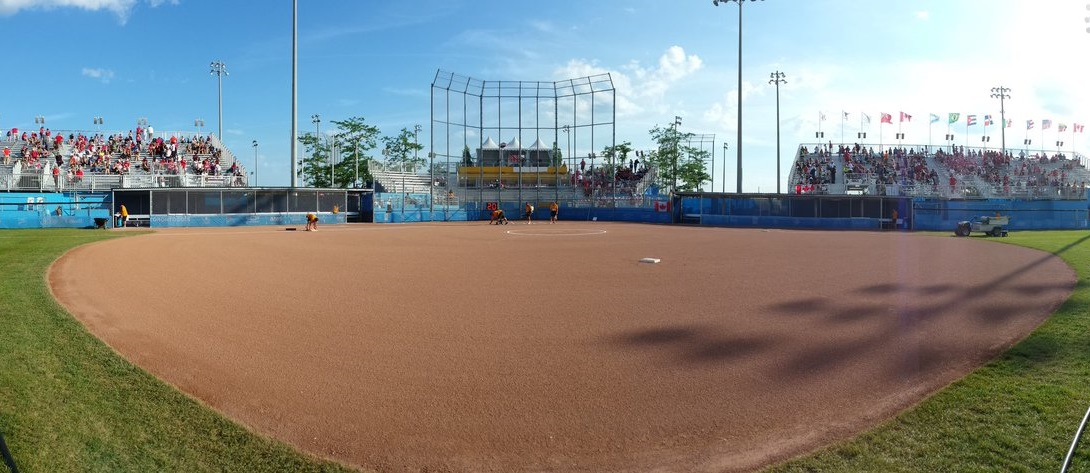
The Pan Am Ball Park in Ajax, was the venue for the softball competitions

The following is the competition schedule for the softball competitions:

P	Preliminaries	½	Semifinals	B	3rd place play-off	F	Final

Event↓/Date →	Sun 12	Mon 13	Tue 14	Wed 15	Thu 16	Fri 17	Sat 18		Sun 19	Mon 20	Tue 21	Wed 22	Thu 23	Fri 24	Sat 25	Sun 26
Men	P	P	P	P	P	½	B	F								
Women									P	P	P	P	P	½	B	F

== Medal summary ==
=== Medal table ===
* Host nation (Canada)

Rank	Nation	Gold	Silver	Bronze	Total
1	Canada*	2	0	0	2
2	United States	0	1	0	1
2	Venezuela	0	1	0	1
4	Argentina	0	0	1	1
4	Puerto Rico	0	0	1	1
Totals (5 entries)		2	2	2	6

=== Medalists ===
Event	Gold	Silver	Bronze
Men's tournament	Canada; Ryan Boland; Sean Cleary; Jeff Ellsworth; Brad Ezekiel; Ian Fehrman; Jason Hill; Brandon Horn; Paul Koert; Derek Mayson; Steve Mullaley; Mathieu Roy; Jason Sanford; Kevin Schellenberg; Andy Skelton; Ryan Wolfe	Venezuela; Arturo Acacio; Yeider Chirinos; Joan Colombo; Rafael Flores; Pedro Gonzalez; Ramon Jones; Jorge Lima; Edwin Linares; Tulio Linares; Iran Paez; Luiger Pinto; Kerlis Rivero; Rogelio Sequera; Erick Urbaneja; John Zambrano	Argentina; Mauricio Caceres; Santiago Carril; Sebastian Gervasutti; Gustavo Godoy; Manuel Godoy; Roman Godoy; Juan Malarczuk; Huemul Mata; Teo Migliavacca; Mariano Montero; Pablo Montero; Bruno Motroni; Fernando Petric; Juan Potolicchio; Juan Zara
Women's tournament	Canada; Jenna Caira; Jocelyn Cater; Larissa Franklin; Sara Groenewegen; Megan Gurski; Karissa Hovinga; Joey Lye; Erika Polidori; Kaleigh Rafter; Sara Riske; Jenn Salling; Megan Timpf; Logan White; Natalie Wideman; Jen Yee	United States; Valerie Arioto; Ally Carda; Raven Chavanne; Amanda Chidester; Kellie Fox; Lauren Gibson; Janelle Lindvall; Haylie McCleney; Jessica Moore; Michelle Moultrie; Sara Nevins; Sierra Romero; Kelsey Stewart; Janie Takeda; Jaclyn Traina	Puerto Rico; Karla Claudio; Dayanira Diaz; Quianna Diaz-Patterson; Elicia D'Orazio; Sahvanna Jaquish; Galis Lozada; Yairka Moran; Yahelis Munoz; Kiara Nazario; Aleshia Ocasio; Nicole Osterman; Gabriela Palacios; Shemiah Sanchez; Monica Santos; Yazmin Torres

== Qualification ==
A total of six men's teams and six women's team qualified to compete at the games. The top six teams (including Canada) at the 2013 Pan American Women's championships and 2014 Pan American Men's championships qualified to compete at the games. Each team can contain a maximum of fifteen athletes.

=== Men ===
Event	Date	Location	Vacancies	Qualified
Host Nation	—N/a	—N/a	1	Canada
2014 Pan American Championship	October 25 – November 1	(Argentina) Paraná	5	Venezuela; Argentina; United States; Dominican Republic; Mexico
TOTAL			6	

=== Women ===
Event	Date	Location	Vacancies	Qualified
Host Nation	—N/a	—N/a	1	Canada
2013 Pan American Championship	August 10–18	(Puerto Rico) Guaynabo	5	United States; Cuba; Puerto Rico; Dominican Republic; Brazil
TOTAL			6	

== Participating nations ==
A total of nine countries have qualified softball teams.

- Argentina (15 athletes)
- Brazil (15)
- Canada (30)
- Cuba (15)
- Dominican Republic (30)
- Mexico (15)
- Puerto Rico (15)
- United States (30)
- Venezuela (15)
