= Softball at the 2015 Pan American Games – Women's tournament =

Softball – Women's tournament at the 2015 Pan American Games
- Venue: Pan Am Ball Park
- Dates: July 19 – 26
- Competitors: 90 from 6 nations

Medalists
Gold medal	Canada
Silver medal	United States
Bronze medal	Puerto Rico

The women's softball tournament at the 2015 Pan American Games in Toronto, Canada, held at the Pan Am Ball Park in Ajax, Ontario from July 19 to 26.

For these Games, the women competed in a 6-team tournament. The teams were grouped into one single pool and all teams played each other in a round-robin preliminary round. The top four teams would advance to the semifinals.

== Qualification ==
A total of six women's team qualified to compete at the games. Canada as host nation qualified automatically, along with the top five nations at the qualification event held in August 2013. Each team can contain a maximum of fifteen athletes.

=== Summary ===
Event	Date	Location	Vacancies	Qualified
Host Nation	—N/a	—N/a	1	Canada
2013 Pan American Championship	August 10–18	(Puerto Rico) Guaynabo	5	United States; Cuba; Puerto Rico; Dominican Republic; Brazil
TOTAL			6	

== Rosters ==
At the start of tournament, all six participating countries had up to 15 players on their rosters.

- Brazil
- Canada
- Cuba
- Dominican Republic
- Puerto Rico
- United States

== Medalists ==
Event	Gold	Silver	Bronze
Women's tournament	Canada; Jenna Caira; Jocelyn Cater; Larissa Franklin; Sara Groenewegen; Megan Gurski; Karissa Hovinga; Joey Lye; Erika Polidori; Kaleigh Rafter; Sara Riske; Jenn Salling; Megan Timpf; Logan White; Natalie Wideman; Jen Yee	United States; Valerie Arioto; Ally Carda; Raven Chavanne; Amanda Chidester; Kellie Fox; Lauren Gibson; Janelle Lindvall; Haylie McCleney; Jessica Moore; Michelle Moultrie; Sara Nevins; Sierra Romero; Kelsey Stewart; Janie Takeda; Jaclyn Traina	Puerto Rico; Karla Claudio; Dayanira Diaz; Quianna Diaz-Patterson; Elicia D'Orazio; Sahvanna Jaquish; Galis Lozada; Yairka Moran; Yahelis Munoz; Kiara Nazario; Aleshia Ocasio; Nicole Osterman; Gabriela Palacios; Shemiah Sanchez; Monica Santos; Yazmin Torres

== Competition format ==
In the first round of the competition, teams were divided into one pool of six teams, and play followed round robin format with each of the teams playing all other teams in the pool once.

Following the completion of the pool games, the top four teams advanced to a page playoff round consisting of two semifinal games, and the final and grand final. All games were played over seven innings.

== Results ==
The official detailed schedule was revealed on May 1, 2015.

All times are Eastern Daylight Time (UTC−4)

=== Preliminary round ===
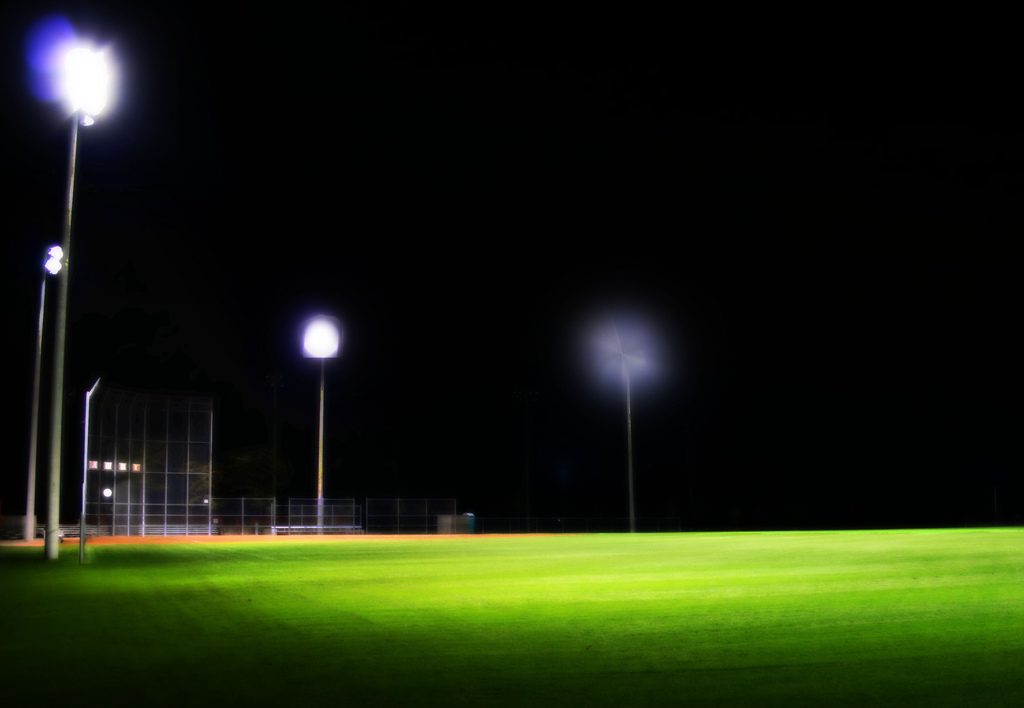
The Pan Am Ball Park in Ajax, the venue for the women's softball competition

Team	Pld	W	L	RF	RA	RD	Qualification
United States	5	5	0	43	4	+39	Qualified for the semifinals
Canada	5	4	1	21	14	+7	Qualified for the semifinals
Puerto Rico	5	3	2	18	17	+1	Qualified for the semifinals
Brazil	5	2	3	7	19	−12	Qualified for the semifinals
Cuba	5	1	4	10	23	−13	
Dominican Republic	5	0	5	14	36	−22	

19 July 2015; 14:00	Dominican Republic	1 – 3	Cuba	President’s Choice Ajax Pan Am Ballpark, Ajax; Attendance: 2,895
19 July 2015; 14:00		Boxscore		President’s Choice Ajax Pan Am Ballpark, Ajax; Attendance: 2,895

19 July 2015; 16:30	Canada	6 – 0	Brazil	President’s Choice Ajax Pan Am Ballpark, Ajax; Attendance: 2,234
19 July 2015; 16:30		Boxscore		President’s Choice Ajax Pan Am Ballpark, Ajax; Attendance: 2,234

19 July 2015; 19:00	Puerto Rico	2 – 9	United States	President’s Choice Ajax Pan Am Ballpark, Ajax; Attendance: 234
19 July 2015; 19:00		Boxscore		President’s Choice Ajax Pan Am Ballpark, Ajax; Attendance: 234

20 July 2015; 14:00	Brazil	0 – 7	United States	President’s Choice Ajax Pan Am Ballpark, Ajax; Attendance: 502
20 July 2015; 14:00		Boxscore		President’s Choice Ajax Pan Am Ballpark, Ajax; Attendance: 502

20 July 2015; 16:30	Puerto Rico	11 – 5	Dominican Republic	President’s Choice Ajax Pan Am Ballpark, Ajax; Attendance: 375
20 July 2015; 16:30		Boxscore		President’s Choice Ajax Pan Am Ballpark, Ajax; Attendance: 375

20 July 2015; 19:00	Canada	5 – 0	Cuba	President’s Choice Ajax Pan Am Ballpark, Ajax; Attendance: 546
20 July 2015; 19:00		Boxscore		President’s Choice Ajax Pan Am Ballpark, Ajax; Attendance: 546

21 July 2015; 14:00	Puerto Rico	3 – 2	Cuba	President’s Choice Ajax Pan Am Ballpark, Ajax; Attendance: 832
21 July 2015; 14:00		Boxscore		President’s Choice Ajax Pan Am Ballpark, Ajax; Attendance: 832

21 July 2015; 16:30	Brazil	2 – 1	Dominican Republic	President’s Choice Ajax Pan Am Ballpark, Ajax; Attendance: 2,900
21 July 2015; 16:30		Boxscore		President’s Choice Ajax Pan Am Ballpark, Ajax; Attendance: 2,900

21 July 2015; 19:00	Canada	0 – 7	United States	President’s Choice Ajax Pan Am Ballpark, Ajax; Attendance: 2,900
21 July 2015; 19:00		Boxscore		President’s Choice Ajax Pan Am Ballpark, Ajax; Attendance: 2,900

22 July 2015; 14:00	Puerto Rico	2 – 0	Brazil	President’s Choice Ajax Pan Am Ballpark, Ajax; Attendance: 460
22 July 2015; 14:00		Boxscore		President’s Choice Ajax Pan Am Ballpark, Ajax; Attendance: 460

22 July 2015; 16:30	Cuba	2 – 9	United States	President’s Choice Ajax Pan Am Ballpark, Ajax; Attendance: 450
22 July 2015; 16:30		Boxscore		President’s Choice Ajax Pan Am Ballpark, Ajax; Attendance: 450

22 July 2015; 19:00	Canada	9 – 7	Dominican Republic	President’s Choice Ajax Pan Am Ballpark, Ajax; Attendance: 1,200
22 July 2015; 19:00		Boxscore		President’s Choice Ajax Pan Am Ballpark, Ajax; Attendance: 1,200

23 July 2015; 14:00	Dominican Republic	0 – 11	United States	President’s Choice Ajax Pan Am Ballpark, Ajax; Attendance: 112
23 July 2015; 14:00		Boxscore		President’s Choice Ajax Pan Am Ballpark, Ajax; Attendance: 112

23 July 2015; 16:30	Brazil	5 – 3	Cuba	President’s Choice Ajax Pan Am Ballpark, Ajax; Attendance: 347
23 July 2015; 16:30		Boxscore		President’s Choice Ajax Pan Am Ballpark, Ajax; Attendance: 347

23 July 2015; 19:00	Canada	1 – 0	Puerto Rico	President’s Choice Ajax Pan Am Ballpark, Ajax; Attendance: 2,050
23 July 2015; 19:00		Boxscore		President’s Choice Ajax Pan Am Ballpark, Ajax; Attendance: 2,050

=== Medal round ===
Semifinals
1	United States	5
2	Canada	2
3	Puerto Rico	12^{(4)}
4	Brazil	2

Bronze Medal
2	Canada	7
3	Puerto Rico	4

Gold Medal
1	United States	2
2	Canada	4^{(8)}

==== Semifinals ====
24 July 2015; 16:30	Puerto Rico	12 – 2 (4)	Brazil	President’s Choice Ajax Pan Am Ballpark, Ajax; Attendance: 1,050
24 July 2015; 16:30		Boxscore		President’s Choice Ajax Pan Am Ballpark, Ajax; Attendance: 1,050

24 July 2015; 19:00	United States	5 – 2	Canada	President’s Choice Ajax Pan Am Ballpark, Ajax; Attendance: 2,145
24 July 2015; 19:00		Boxscore		President’s Choice Ajax Pan Am Ballpark, Ajax; Attendance: 2,145

==== Bronze Medal Game ====
25 July 2015; 17:00	Canada	7 – 4	Puerto Rico (bronze)	President’s Choice Ajax Pan Am Ballpark, Ajax; Attendance: 2,267
25 July 2015; 17:00		Boxscore		President’s Choice Ajax Pan Am Ballpark, Ajax; Attendance: 2,267

==== Gold Medal Game ====
26 July 2015; 11:00	(silver) United States	2 – 4 (8)	Canada (gold)	President’s Choice Ajax Pan Am Ballpark, Ajax; Attendance: 3,000
26 July 2015; 11:00		Boxscore		President’s Choice Ajax Pan Am Ballpark, Ajax; Attendance: 3,000

2015 Pan American Games winners

Canada
2nd title

== Final standings ==
Rank	Team	Record
Gold medal	Canada	6 – 2
Silver medal	United States	6 – 1
Bronze medal	Puerto Rico	4 – 3
4	Brazil	2 – 4
5	Cuba	1 – 4
6	Dominican Republic	0 – 5
