= Timpf =

Timpf is a surname of German origin. Notable people with the surname include:

- Kat Timpf (born 1988), American libertarian columnist, television personality, reporter and comedian
- Megan Timpf (born 1984), Canadian softball player
