= Softball at the 2019 Pan American Games =

- Softball pictogram
- Venue: Softball stadium
- Dates: July 25 – August 10, 2019
- Competitors: 180 from 8 nations

Softball competitions at the 2019 Pan American Games in Lima, Peru are scheduled to be held from July 25 to August 10. The venue for the competition is the softball stadium located at the Villa María del Triunfo cluster. A total of six men's and six women's teams (each consisting up to 15 athletes) competed in each tournament. This means a total of 180 athletes are scheduled to compete.

== Competition schedule ==
The following is the competition schedule for the softball competitions:

P	Preliminaries	½	Semifinals	B	3rd place play-off	F	Final

Event↓ / Date →	Thu 25	Fri 26	Sat 27	Sun 28	Mon 29	Tue 30	Wed 31	Thu 1		Fri 2	Sat 3	Sun 4	Mon 5	Tue 6	Wed 7	Thu 8	Fri 9	Sat 10	
Men	P		P	P	P	P	½	B	F										
Women												P	P	P	P	P	½	B	F

== Medalists ==
Event	Gold	Silver	Bronze
Men's tournament	Argentina: 1. Huemul Mata; 2. Juan Zara; 3. Teo Migliavacca; 4. Federico Eder; 5. Santiago Carril; 6. Mariano Montero; 7. Gonzalo Ojeda; 8. Juan Malarczuk; 9. Manuel Godoy; 10. Bruno Motroni; 11. Juan Potolicchio; 12. Gian Scialacomo; 13. Román Godoy; 14. Alan Peker; 15. Gustavo Godoy	United States: 1. Jeffrey Nowaczyk; 2. Matt Palazzo; 3. Nicholas Mullins; 4. Erick Ochoa; 5. Antonio Mancha; 6. Joel Cooley; 7. Kevin Castillo; 8. Matthew Ratliff; 9. Mervin Weiler; 10. Cameron Schiller; 11. Marcus Tan; 12. Jenner Christiansen; 13. Jonathan Lynch; 14. Yusef Davis Jr.; 15. Gilbert Saenz	Mexico: 1. Marco González; 2. Jonathan Salazar; 3. Jonathan Muñoz; 4. Edgar López; 5. Rubén Delgadillo; 6. Daniel Durazo; 7. Carlos Ordaz; 8. Lenny Villalvazo; 9. José Hernández; 10. Adán Dueñas; 11. Ismael Peña; 12. Jesús Cardona; 13. Julio Rodríguez; 14. Ernesto Sánchez; 15. Alan Osuna
Women's tournament	United States: 1. Aubree Munro; 2. Alison Aguilar; 3. Kelsey Stewart; 4. Haylie McCleney; 5. Janette Reed; 6. Keilani Ricketts; 7. Monica Abbott; 8. Michelle Moultrie; 9. Valerie Arioto; 10. Rachel Garcia; 11. Kirsti Merritt; 12. Sahvanna Jaquish; 13. Dejah Mulipola; 14. Catherine Osterman; 15. Delaney Spaulding	Canada: 1. Natalie Wideman; 2. Erika Polidori; 3. Joanne Lye; 4. Holly Speers; 5. Jennifer Salling; 6. Victoria Hayward; 7. Janet Leung; 8. Danielle Lawrie; 9. Sara Groenewegen; 10. Emma Entzminger; 11. Jennifer Gilbert; 12. Larissa Franklin; 13. Eujenna Caira; 14. Kaleigh Rafter; 15. Morgan Rackel	Puerto Rico: 1. Alyssa Rivera; 2. Natalia Rodríguez; 3. Yahelis Muñoz; 4. Aleshia Ocasio; 5. Jena Cozza; 6. Aleimalee López; 7. Karla Claudio; 8. Taran Alvelo; 9. Quianna Díaz; 10. Carsyn Gordon; 11. Shemiah Sánchez; 12. Xeana Dung; 13. Meghan King; 14. Adriana Otero; 15. Marta Fuentes

== Participating nations ==
A total of 8 countries qualified softball teams.

- Argentina (15 athletes)
- Canada (15)
- Cuba (15)
- Mexico (30)
- Peru (30)
- Puerto Rico (15)
- United States (30)
- Venezuela (30)

== Qualification ==
A total of six men's teams and six women's team will qualify to compete at the games in each tournament. The host nation (Peru) qualified in each tournament, along with the top five teams at the 2017 Pan American Championships in each event.

=== Men ===
Event	Dates	Location	Vacancies	Qualified
Host Nation	—N/a	—N/a	1	Peru
2017 Pan American Championships	15–24 September	(Dominican Republic) Santo Domingo	5	Venezuela; Argentina; United States; Mexico; Cuba
Total			6	

- Canada, which has won every gold medal in this event at the Pan American Games, failed to qualify for the tournament.

=== Women ===
Event	Dates	Location	Vacancies	Qualified
Host Nation	—N/a	—N/a	1	Peru
2017 Pan American Championships	4–13 August	(Dominican Republic) Santo Domingo	5	United States; Canada; Puerto Rico; Mexico; Venezuela
Total			6	

== See also ==
- Softball at the 2020 Summer Olympics
