= Jennifer Salling =

Canadian softball player (born 1987)

Jenn Salling
- Born: 4 July 1987 (age 39); Burnaby, British Columbia, Canada

Teams
- Oregon (2007); Washington (2008–2011); USSSA Pride (2011–2013); Pennsylvania Rebellion (2014)

Career highlights and awards
- Pac-12 Freshman of the Year (2007); Pac-12 Defensive Player of the Year (2011)
Medals
Women's softball
Representing Canada
Olympic Games
Bronze medal – third place	2020 Tokyo	Team
Pan American Games
Gold medal – first place	2015 Toronto	Team
Silver medal – second place	2019 Lima	Team
Silver medal – second place	2011 Guadalajara	Team
Silver medal – second place	2007 Rio de Janeiro	Team

Jennifer Salling (born 4 July 1987) is a Canadian, former collegiate All-American, medal-winning Olympian and professional softball player. She played college softball at Oregon and Washington, and won a national championship at Washington in 2009. She has also played professionally in the National Pro Fastpitch for the USSSA Pride, Pennsylvania Rebellion and most recently the Canadian Wild. She represented Canada at the 2020 Summer Olympics, where she set the tournament batting average record for a single Olympic games, and won a bronze medal.

== Career ==
Salling began her college softball career at Oregon in 2007, before transferring to Washington in 2008. She won a national championship at Washington in 2009. Salling was drafted third overall by the USSSA Pride in the 2011 NPF Draft and played for them from 2011–14. She most recently played for the Canadian Wild.

== Team Canada ==
Salling represented Canada at the 2008 Summer Olympics.

Salling again represented Canada at the 2020 Summer Olympics. During the tournament, she hit .571 (8-for-14) to break Lisa Fernandez's tournament record. She also recorded five RBIs on two doubles and a homer to slug .928%, walking six times in six games. She also had one of her hits in the bronze medal game against Team Mexico in a 3–2 victory for Team Canada.
