= Megan Timpf =

Canadian softball player (born 1984)

Personal information
- Born: January 21, 1984 (age 42) Simcoe, Ontario, Canada
- Spouse: Erica Soto
Medal record
Women's softball
Representing Canada
Pan American Games
Gold medal – first place	2015 Toronto	Team
Silver medal – second place	2011 Guadalajara	Team

Megan Timpf-Soto (born January 21, 1984) is a Canadian softball player.

== Life and career ==
Timpf competed in the 2008 Summer Olympics for the Canadian women's national softball team under the tutelage of coach Lori Sippel; she has been a member of the national team since 2005. When Timpf plays softball, her position is either third base or shortstop. Timpf gives credit to her sister Amber for helping her get interested in softball. Even though Timpf had to recover through two anterior cruciate ligament (ACL) surgeries, she has continued to play softball.

Timpf's parents are Peter and Andrea Timpf. She also attended Simcoe Composite School and graduated in 2008 with a certificate to become an elementary school teacher. She is an English-speaking right-handed Olympic athlete from Port Dover, Ontario, Canada (which is the major fishing hub of Norfolk County). During the 2008 Summer Olympics in Beijing, her team lost a medal-round match to the Australian women's national softball team by a score of 5-3 in favor of Australia. In her first year of college softball while attending the California University of Pennsylvania, Timpf managed to garner a .311 batting average (42 base hits out of 127 attempts) in addition to five home runs, 22 runs batted in, 26 runs scored and 97 assists.

At the 2011 Pan American Games, Timpf helped Canada to win a silver medal for softball. She has competed in many World Cups of Softball and Canada Cups.

At the 2015 Pan American Games, Timpf helped Canada to win a gold medal for softball.
