= Joey Lye =

Canadian softball player

Personal information
- Born: May 4, 1987 (age 39) Toronto, Ontario Canada
- Height: 160 cm (5 ft 3 in)
Medal record
Women's softball
Representing Canada
Olympic Games
Bronze medal – third place	2020 Tokyo	Team
Pan American Games
Gold medal – first place	2015 Toronto
Silver medal – second place	2019 Lima
Silver medal – second place	2011 Guadalajara

Joey Lye (born May 4, 1987) is a Canadian softball player.

== Career ==
Lye has competed at three Pan American Games. At the 2011 Pan American Games, Lye won silver. At the 2015 Pan American Games in Toronto, she won the gold medal, and again at the 2019 Pan American Games in Lima, winning silver.

She was the head softball coach at Bucknell from 2018 to 2020 before stepping down to pursue her Olympic dream.

In June 2021, Lye was named to Canada's 2020 Olympic team. She is openly lesbian.
