= Natalie Wideman =

Canadian softball player (born 1992)

Charros de Jalisco
- Catcher
- Born: January 11, 1992 (age 34); Mississauga, Ontario, Canada
- Bats: Right Throws: Right

Teams
- Charros de Jalisco (2026–present)
Medals
Women's softball
Representing Canada
Olympic Games
Bronze medal – third place	2020 Tokyo	Team
Women's World Cup
Bronze medal – third place	2024 Castions di Strada	Team
Pan American Games
Gold medal – first place	2015 Toronto	Team
Silver medal – second place	2019 Lima	Team
Bronze medal – third place	2023 Santiago	Team

Natalie Wideman (born January 11, 1992) is a Canadian softball player.

== Career ==
Wideman competed at the 2015 Pan American Games in Toronto, winning the gold medal, and again at the 2019 Pan American Games in Lima, winning silver.

In June 2021, Wideman was named to Canada's 2020 Olympic team.

Wideman represented Canada at the 2024 Women's Softball World Cup and won a bronze medal.

In December 2025, Wideman joined the Charros de Jalisco of the Mexican Softball League ahead of the 2026 season.
