= Jenna Caira =

Canadian softball player (born 1989)

Biographical details
- Born: April 1, 1989 (age 37); Richmond Hill, Ontario, Canada

Playing career
- 2009–2012: Syracuse Orange
- 2019: Canadian Wild
- Position: Pitcher

Coaching career (HC unless noted)
- 2013–2014: Syracuse (Asst.)
Medal record
Women's softball
Representing Canada
Olympic Games
Bronze medal – third place	2020 Tokyo	Team
Pan American Games
Gold medal – first place	2015 Toronto
Silver medal – second place	2011 Guadalajara
Silver medal – second place	2019 Lima
World Championships
Bronze medal – third place	2010 Caracas
Bronze medal – third place	2018 Chiba

Eujenna "Jenna" Afrodite Caira (born April 1, 1989) is a Canadian, former collegiate All-American, medal-winning Olympian, professional softball pitcher for the Canadian Wild of the National Pro Fastpitch (NPF). Caira was a starting pitcher for the Syracuse Orange from 2009–12 and holds the career records in wins, shutouts and innings pitched. Additionally, she is the Big East Conference career leader in strikeouts. She has been a member of the Canada women's national softball team since June 2009 and helped them win a bronze medal at the 2020 Summer Olympics.

== Early life ==
Caira was born in Richmond Hill, Ontario, just north of Toronto, growing up in Gormley, just outside of Richmond Hill. She began playing softball at age four, inspired by watching her older sister, Danielle. Her inspiration for becoming a pitcher came from watching her other older sister, Nadia. While in high school, she lived for two years in Switzerland.

== College career ==
After being offered several scholarships, she decided to join Syracuse University, where she received a full scholarship. Jenna attended Syracuse from 2009 until 2012 and played for the women's softball team. In her first season in 2009, she was named Big East Rookie of the Year. She is the only player to record 1,000 strikeouts in the Big East Conference, finishing with 1,051 total. She is the all-time leader in many categories for Syracuse softball in many categories including games played, wins, strikeouts, games started, complete games, shutouts, lowest ERA and lowest opponent's batting average. Caira helped the team become champions of the Big East Conference softball tournament in 2010 and 2011, winning MVP honours both years. She served as team captain in both 2011 and 2012. During her senior season, she threw a no-hitter against Rutgers. and picked up six weekly Big East Conference honours. She was also named an All-American in her senior year. She returned to Syracuse in 2013 and 2014 and served as an assistant coach and pitching coach.

On April 29, 2023, Syracuse retired her #29 jersey. She is the first Syracuse softball player to have their number retired.

== National team ==
Caira has played with the Canada national team since 2009. She has won five medals competing for Canada - one Gold and two Silver at the Pan American Games and two bronze medals at the World Championships. In 2013, she was named team captain. She retired from the National Team following the 2015 gold medal performance at the Pan-Am Games, but eventually returned to compete with the national team, a year and a half later. She made her Olympic debut on June 21, 2021 for Team Canada at the 2020 Olympic Games against Mexico. Caira won a bronze medal with the Canadian team at those Olympics, which was Canada's first ever in the sport, after defeating Mexico in the bronze-medal match, in which she pitched 1 2/3 innings. Over the course of the Olympics, she finished with a 1–1 record, pitching 11 1/3 innings, with a 1.24 ERA.

== Personal ==
Jenna has one brother and two sisters. She wears #29 in honour of her pitching coach, Todd Martin. She guest starred on an episode of Canadian sitcom Mr. D, as herself, in 2015. She is sponsored by Rawlings Canada. She pitches at around 65 miles-per-hour and her signature pitch is the change-up.

After her playing career, Caira became the head of franchise recruitment for Laser Clinics Canada.

== Career statistics ==
=== NCAA ===
YEAR	W	L	GP	GS	CG	SHO	SV	IP	H	R	ER	BB	SO	ERA	WHIP
2009	16	11	34	27	16	6	1	186.1	148	84	62	83	192	2.33	1.24
2010	19	11	36	31	21	2	0	185.0	143	86	61	79	251	2.31	1.20
2011	35	11	53	45	25	10	3	283.1	193	94	61	96	321	1.51	1.02
2012	27	9	44	38	20	10	2	232.1	129	72	54	98	277	1.63	0.98
TOTALS	97	42	167	141	82	28	6	887.0	613	336	238	356	1041	1.88	1.09
