= Kaleigh Rafter =

Canadian softball player

Personal information
- Born: August 18, 1986 (age 39) Guelph, Ontario, Canada
- Height: 184 cm (6 ft 0 in)
- Weight: 80 kg (176 lb)
Medal record
Women's softball
Representing Canada
Olympic Games
Bronze medal – third place	2020 Tokyo	Team
Women's Softball World Cup
Bronze medal – third place	2018 Japan
Bronze medal – third place	2016 Surrey
Bronze medal – third place	2010 Caracas
Pan American Games
Gold medal – first place	2015 Toronto
Silver medal – second place	2019 Lima
Silver medal – second place	2011 Guadalajara
Silver medal – second place	2007 Rio de Janeiro

Kaleigh Rafter (born August 18, 1986) is a Canadian softball player.

== Career ==
Rafter has been part of the national women's team since 2007. Rafter represented her country at the 2008 Summer Olympics in Beijing, China, where the team finished fourth.

Rafter has represented Canada at four Pan American Games: 2007, 2011, 2015 and 2019, winning medals at all four events, including a gold medal in 2015 on home soil. Rafter was named to Canada's 2020 Olympic team in May 2021.
