= Ally Carda =

American softball player (born 1993)

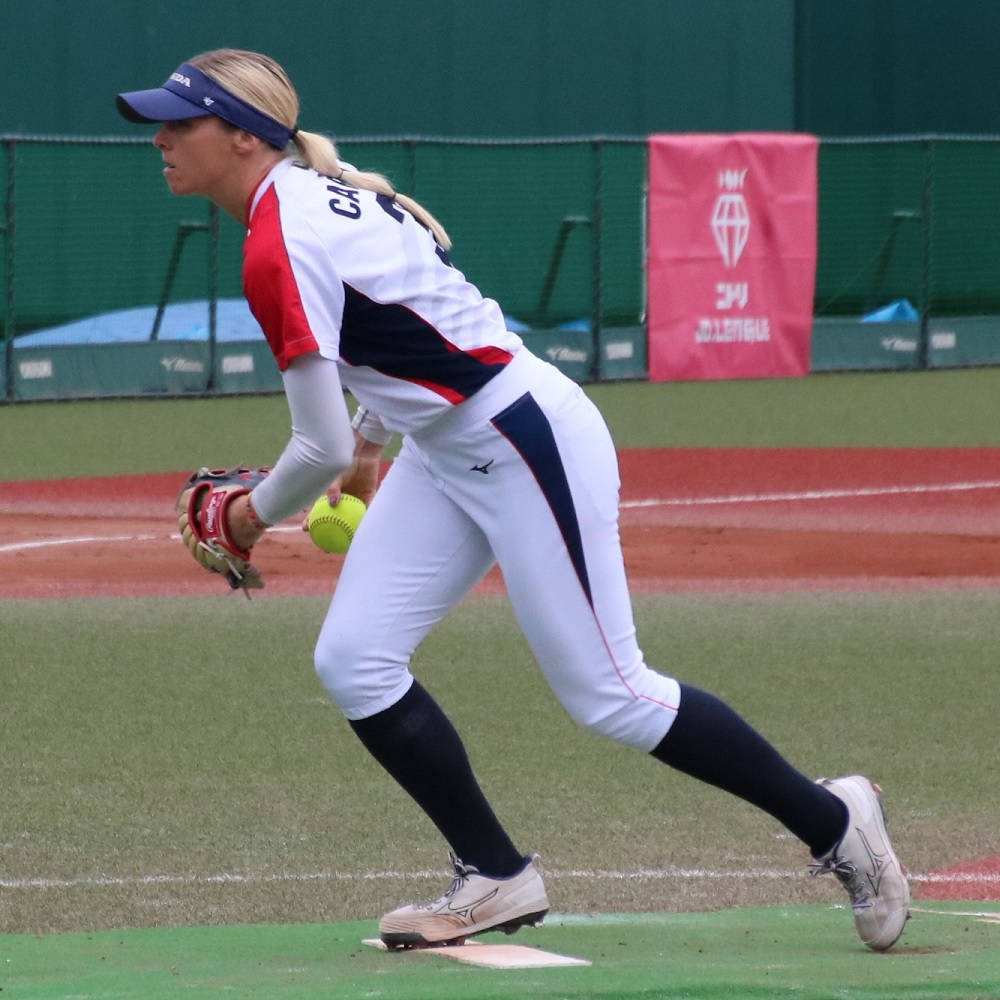
- Carda in 2023

Texas Volts
- Pitcher/Utility
- Born: January 15, 1993 (age 33); Sacramento, California, U.S.
- Bats: Right Throws: Right

Teams
- UCLA Bruins (2012–2015); United States National Team (2015–present); Texas Charge (2017); Chicago Bandits (2018); Honda Reverta (2019); Texas Volts (2026–present)
Medals
Women's softball
Representing United States
Olympic Games
Silver medal – second place	2020 Tokyo	Team
World Cup
Silver medal – second place	2024 Castions di Strada	Team
World Games
Gold medal – first place	2022 Birmingham	Team
Gold medal – first place	2025 Chengdu	Team
Pan American Games
Gold medal – first place	2023 Santiago	Team
Silver medal – second place	2015 Toronto	Team

Allyson "Ally" Nicole Carda (born January 15, 1993) is an American professional softball pitcher and first baseman for the Texas Volts of the Athletes Unlimited Softball League (AUSL). She has been a member of the United States women's national softball team since 2015 and represented Team USA at the 2020 Summer Olympics and won a silver medal. She played college softball for the UCLA Bruins from 2012 to 2015, and won back-to-back conference Player of the Year awards in 2014 and 2015. She also earned back-to-back National Fastpitch Coaches Association First Team All-American honors.

== Early life ==
Carda was born on January 15, 1993, in Sacramento, California, to parents Heather and Jim Carda. Carda and her family moved to Elk Grove, California, where she attended Pleasant Grove High School, from where she graduated in 2011. She is openly lesbian and her partner is Kelly Kretschman.

== College career ==
Carda signed a letter of intent to play for UCLA during her senior year of High School. Carda became one of the all-time greats in the winningest program in history, becoming the best 2 way player for the Bruins since Lisa Fernandez.

== Professional career ==
On December 1, 2025, Carda was drafted sixth overall by the Volts in the AUSL allocation draft.

== International career ==
Carda was named to the United States women's national softball team roster in 2015. Carda also played for the Red, White, and Blue in 2016 and 2017. Carda helped the Red, White, and Blue to a World Cup of Softball Gold Medal in 2015, and a Silver in 2016. Carda also won a silver medal at the 2015 Pan American Games and a gold medal at the 2016 Women's Softball World Championship. Carda represented Team USA at the 2020 Summer Olympics and won a silver medal. At the Tokyo Games, Carda suffered the loss in the gold medal game to Team Japan in two innings of work on July 27, 2021. For the tournament, Carda pitched eight innings and scored a run for Team USA.

On August 31, 2023, Carda was named to the U.S. women's national team for the 2023 Pan American Games.

Carda represented the United States at the 2024 Women's Softball World Cup and won a silver medal.

== Statistics ==
UCLA Bruins
Year	W	L	GP	GS	CG	Sh	SV	IP	H	R	ER	BB	SO	ERA	WHIP
2012	13	5	37	25	6	1	1	120.0	101	65	58	71	97	3.38	1.43
2013	23	10	46	27	12	3	0	206.2	154	87	71	88	217	2.41	1.17
2014	32	5	46	32	18	9	2	220.2	169	79	60	65	230	1.90	1.06
2015	32	8	49	33	18	9	3	240.0	184	106	90	123	281	2.62	1.28
TOTALS	100	28	178	117	54	22	6	787.1	608	337	279	347	825	2.48	1.21

UCLA Bruins
Year	G	AB	R	H	BA	RBI	HR	3B	2B	TB	SLG	BB	SO	SB	SBA
2012	52	108	16	31	.287	25	4	1	5	50	.463%	15	24	1	1
2013	60	117	16	60	.339	50	18	1	7	123	.695%	31	18	1	2
2014	60	175	56	69	.394	65	13	2	11	123	.703%	39	16	9	18
2015	63	183	59	60	.328	50	8	0	15	100	.541%	57	23	4	5
TOTALS	235	643	173	220	.342	180	43	4	38	395	.614%	142	81	15	26

Team USA
Year	W	L	GP	GS	CG	SHO	SV	IP	H	R	ER	BB	SO	ERA	WHIP
2015	3	0	8	4	2	2	0	24.2	14	2	2	10	20	0.57	0.99
2016	5	0	9	6	0	0	0	24.0	10	5	3	8	32	0.88	0.75
2020	2	0	9	4	2	0	0	23.1	15	11	10	7	33	3.03	0.95
2021	8	0	15	5	0	0	0	51.2	29	7	6	25	52	0.82	1.05
Olympics	0	1	2	1	0	0	0	8.0	7	4	3	3	11	2.62	1.25
TOTALS	17	1	43	20	4	2	0	131.2	75	29	24	53	148	1.28	0.97

NPF
YEAR	G	AB	R	H	BA	RBI	HR	3B	2B	TB	SLG	BB	SO	SB
2017	5	6	1	1	.166	0	0	0	0	1	.166%	1	1	0
2018	26	21	4	9	.428	5	1	1	0	14	.666%	3	3	0
2019	3	6	1	2	.333	0	0	0	0	2	.333%	3	2	1
TOTALS	34	33	6	12	.363	5	1	1	0	17	.515%	7	6	1

YEAR	W	L	GP	GS	CG	Sh	SV	IP	H	R	ER	BB	SO	ERA	WHIP
2017	3	1	5	4	1	0	0	23.1	21	5	5	6	28	1.51	1.17
2018	5	3	27	6	0	0	4	44.0	26	12	10	21	45	1.59	1.07
2019	0	0	5	1	0	0	1	7.2	7	6	6	3	8	5.83	1.39
TOTALS	8	4	37	11	1	0	5	75.0	54	23	21	30	81	1.96	1.12
