= Valerie Arioto =

American softball player

- Pitcher / First baseman
- Born: April 10, 1989 (age 37); Pleasanton, California, U.S.
- Bats: Right Throws: Right

Teams
- California (2008–2012); United States National Team (2012–present)
Medals
Women's softball
Representing United States
Olympic Games
Silver medal – second place	2020 Tokyo	Team
Pan American Games
Gold medal – first place	2011 Guadalajara	Team
Gold medal – first place	2019 Lima	Team
Silver medal – second place	2015 Toronto	Team

Valerie "Val" Ann Arioto (born April 10, 1989) is an American, former collegiate All-American, medal-winning Olympian, softball pitcher and first baseman. She was a pitcher and infielder for the California Golden Bears in the Pac-12 Conference. She has also served as a member of the United States women's national softball team since 2012, and at the 2020 Summer Olympics helped the team win a silver medal.

== Career ==
Arioto attended Foothill High School and the University of California, Berkeley from 2008–2010, 12, where she earned a Second Team and two First-Team All-Pac-12 honors, including being named 2012 Pac-12 Player of The Year. She was also recognized by the National Fastpitch Coaches Association as a Third Team and two-time First Team All-American. With United States women's national softball team she won 2011 World Cup of Softball and has since been a member for eight years.

== International career ==
Arioto represented Team USA at the 2020 Summer Olympics and won a silver medal. Arioto recorded three hits and two walks for the team during the tournament. Team USA was defeated by Team Japan in the gold medal game.

== Statistics ==
California Golden Bears
YEAR	G	AB	R	H	BA	RBI	HR	3B	2B	TB	SLG	BB	SO	SB	SBA
2008	70	219	55	71	.324	29	2	4	17	102	.465%	48	51	14	16
2009	58	163	41	53	.325	37	10	1	6	91	.558%	41	36	15	16
2010	63	138	61	49	.355	60	19	0	7	113	.819%	81	40	12	12
2012	65	137	65	50	.365	60	23	0	6	125	.912%	94	24	5	5
TOTALS	256	657	222	223	.339	186	54	5	36	431	.656%	264	151	46	49

YEAR	W	L	GP	GS	CG	Sh	SV	IP	H	R	ER	BB	SO	ERA	WHIP
2008	8	3	30	8	2	1	1	87.0	60	37	24	57	105	1.93	1.34
2009	14	9	37	16	7	2	1	160.1	139	82	55	68	173	2.40	1.29
2010	21	9	35	26	19	11	0	205.2	126	49	42	66	264	1.43	0.93
2012	20	3	24	24	15	6	0	127.0	92	31	24	33	155	1.32	0.98
TOTALS	63	24	126	74	43	20	2	580.0	417	199	145	224	697	1.75	1.10

Team USA
YEAR	G	AB	R	H	BA	RBI	HR	3B	2B	TB	SLG	BB	SO	SB
2020	13	32	9	9	.281	11	2	0	2	17	.531%	10	3	0
2021	31	75	13	16	.213	15	6	0	5	39	.520%	22	12	0
Olympics	6	17	1	3	.176	1	0	0	0	3	.176%	2	3	0
TOTAL	50	124	23	28	.226	27	8	0	7	59	.476%	34	18	0
