= Haylie McCleney =

American softball player

- Outfielder
- Born: July 11, 1994; Morris, Alabama, U.S.
- Bats: Left Throws: Left

Teams
- Alabama (2013–2016); USSSA Pride (2016); Texas Charge (2017); Scrap Yard Fast Pitch (2018–2020); Team USA (2016–2024)

Career highlights and awards
- 2× World Champion (2016, 2018); Alabama career batter average leader (.447); 3× First Team All-American (2014-2016); Second Team All-American (2013)
Medals
Women's softball
Representing United States
Olympic Games
Silver medal – second place	2020 Tokyo	Team
World Cup
Silver medal – second place	2024 Castions di Strada	Team
World Games
Gold medal – first place	2022 Birmingham	Team
Pan American Games
Gold medal – first place	2019 Lima	Team
Gold medal – first place	2023 Santiago	Team
Silver medal – second place	2015 Toronto	Team

Haylie Ann McCleney (born July 11, 1994) is an American former professional softball outfielder. She played college softball for Alabama. She represented the United States at the 2020 Summer Olympics and won a silver medal. She most recently played in the Athletes Unlimited Softball league.

== Career ==
McCleney played college softball for Alabama from 2013 to 2016, earning Second Team and three First Team All-SEC honors. She was also named a Second Team and three First Team All-American from the National Fastpitch Coaches Association. McCleney would end her career with the Alabama Crimson Tide batting crown and a member of the elite .400 average, 300 hits, 200 runs, 100 stolen bases club.

She played in the inaugural season of Athletes Unlimited Softball league. On July 25, 2024, McCleney announced she would retire at the conclusion of the Athletes Unlimited summer season.

== International career ==
McCleney has been a member of the United States women's national softball team since 2013. She represented Team USA at the 2020 Summer Olympics and won a silver medal. She led Team USA in batting average, batting .529 throughout the 2020 Olympics with nine hits and four runs in six games, her hits leading the tournament. Team USA was defeated by Team Japan in the gold medal game 2–0, where she was shutout at the plate. Following the tournament, she was named to the WBSC All-Olympic softball team.

On August 31, 2023, McCleney was named to the U.S. women's national team for the 2023 Pan American Games.

McCleney represented the United States at the 2024 Women's Softball World Cup and won a silver medal.

== Personal life ==
McCleney is married to former Florida State softball pitcher Kylee Hanson in August 2, 2025.

== Statistics ==
Alabama Crimson Tide
YEAR	G	AB	R	H	BA	RBI	HR	3B	2B	TB	SLG	BB	SO	SB	SBA
2013	60	185	68	86	.465	41	4	4	14	120	.648%	32	10	30	31
2014	65	198	70	88	.444	42	10	4	12	138	.697%	50	12	34	37
2015	63	165	69	72	.436	47	8	3	14	116	.703%	61	9	32	34
2016	60	152	72	67	.441	32	5	5	17	109	.717%	56	14	22	23
TOTALS	248	700	279	313	.447	162	27	16	57	483	.690%	199	45	118	125

Team USA
YEAR	G	AB	R	H	BA	RBI	HR	3B	2B	TB	SLG	BB	SO	SB
2020	11	32	14	16	.500	7	0	3	3	25	.781%	7	1	5
2021	31	101	31	40	.396	22	9	5	4	81	.802%	16	9	9
Olympics	6	17	3	9	.529	0	0	1	0	11	.647%	4	1	2
TOTAL	48	150	48	65	.433	29	9	9	7	117	.780%	27	11	16

Athletes Unlimited Softball
YEAR	G	AB	R	H	BA	RBI	HR	3B	2B	TB	SLG	BB	SO	SB
2020	15	53	6	21	.396	13	6	0	3	42	.792%	5	6	1
