= Jennifer Yee (softball) =

Canadian softball player

Personal information
- Nationality: Canadian
- Born: 14 June 1987 (age 37); Surrey, British Columbia, Canada

Sport
- Sport: Softball

Jennifer Yee (born 14 June 1987) is a Canadian softball player. She competed in the women's tournament at the 2008 Summer Olympics. At the collegiate level she played for Niagara and Georgia Tech, later serving as an assistant coach at UMass Lowell while pursuing her graduate studies in mechanical engineering at the institution.
