= Janie Takeda =

American softball player

Scrap Yard Fast Pitch – No. 40
- Outfield
- Born: April 15, 1993 (age 32); Placentia, California, U.S.
- Bats: Left Throws: Right

Teams
- Oregon Ducks (2012–2015); Scrap Yard Fast Pitch (2018–present)
Medals
Women's softball
Representing United States
Olympic Games
Silver medal – second place	2020 Tokyo	Team
Pan American Games
Silver medal – second place	2015 Toronto	Team

Janette Miiko "Janie" Takeda-Reed (born April 15, 1993) is an American, former collegiate All-American, medal-winning Olympian, professional softball outfielder. She played college softball at Oregon, where she earned three First Team All-Pac-12 honors. She also was named a First Team and Second Team All-American three of her four years. She is a member of the elite 300 hits, 200 runs, 100 stolen base club. Takeda-Reed since graduating competes for the Team USA softball team and competed at the 2020 Summer Olympics and won a silver medal.

== Early and personal life ==
Takeda-Reed was born Janette Miiko Takeda in Placentia, California. She is the youngest and most decorated of three sisters in a softball family. The oldest, Allison, played in high school and Michelle, middle, played softball at the collegiate level for Maryland and Southern Mississippi University. Takeda attended El Dorado High School and played travel ball for the OC Batbusters. The 5'7" outfielder bats left handed, throws right handed, wore Oregon's jersey number 19, and currently wears Team USA's jersey number 9. Growing up in a softball family meant that Takeda would bat six days a week with her dad and was offensively different from her sisters. When asked why Takeda loves softball she states, "I enjoy when a team comes together and fights for a common goal. I also love when the girls on your team not only make you a better player, but a better person and add laughter and joy to your life." Takeda's dream job is to work on sports films and in sports journalism reporting for games and making a difference in women's sports.

== Playing career ==
=== High school ===
Janie graduated from El Dorado High School, located in Placentia, California, in 2011. Takeda played on the varsity softball team for all four years and was voted Female Athlete of the Year during her senior year. Takeda participated in a total of 85 games and with 10 wins and 14 losses in her final high school season. Takeda held an overall batting average of .466 and 132 hits. Takeda had an on base percentage of .503, with 26 runs batted in (RBI) and scored a total of 63 runs. Takeda is a four time All-Century League winner, a Cal Hi Sports/ All-Orange County 1st team, and a league co-MVP. Off the field, Takeda received honor roll pick her senior year and distinguished scholar.

=== Travel softball ===
Takeda played for the OC Batbusters from 2008–2011. In 2010, Takeda helped her team to a 3rd place finish in the 2010 Premier Girls Softball Tourney. In 2011, Takeda had a .460 batting average during the PGF tournament and lead her team to a 4th place finish.

=== College ===
Takeda graduated from the University of Oregon in 2015, majoring in journalism with a 3.17 grade point average. Takeda played for the Ducks, rostered as number 19 on the softball team. She was a three time NFCA All American and a three time first team All-Pac12. Takeda stated, " I chose Oregon because I wanted to play in the best conference in the country. I also love the city of Eugene and loved what the coaches were and are about. I loved being a part of a rapidly growing program. During Takeda's senior year, she was named to the USA softball player of the year preseason top 50 watch list and received the UO's Jackson Award. The Jackson athletic trophy is awarded annually each spring to an outstanding graduating senior female athlete. The recipient is selected based on outstanding athletic ability, scholastic achievement, leadership ability, and inspiration to other athletes. Nominations are made by UO student-athletes and winners are selected by student-athletes and athletic department staff. Aside from Takeda's accomplishments on the field, she started a community service project at Mt. Pisgah, which dealt with restoring the mountain by planting trees. She delivered food to local families as a part of the Thanksgiving basket drive and was a key contributor to raising money for the UNICEF campus group's drive for "Chemo Ducks". During Takeda's junior year at UO, she was named NFCA second team All America, NCAA Eugene regional MVP, 1st team All-Pacific region, and 1st team All-Pac-12. Her season statistics included, a .388 batting average, went 20 for 24 on stolen bases, .545 slugging percentage, and a .451 on base percentage. During her sophomore season, she was named NFCA 1st team All American, 1st team All-Pacific region, 1st team All-Pac-12, and NCAA regional All-Tournament team. Her stats include a .466 batting average, went 31 for 37 on stolen bases, slugged .582, and had a .466 on base percentage. During the 2014 spring season, Takeda was chosen by ESPN to blog the Duck's journey to the Women College World Series. Takeda titled her blog, Time to Finish What We Started and spoke about the teams emotions throughout the season and the balance it takes to handle work, school, and the pressure that comes with both tasks. Takeda holds 4 career records at Oregon, most career hits 309, most career runs 204, most career doubles 42 and most career stolen bases 102. She also holds the single season record for triples 8. She was also added to the 300 hits-200 runs - 100 stolen bases club.

=== Professional ===
Takeda was drafted 26th overall by the Dallas Charge in the 2015 NPF Draft, but chose to take her career towards Team USA.

== Team USA ==
Takeda has been a member of the United States women's national softball team for four years and chose to roster for Team USA over the Dallas Charge. She represented Team USA in the World Cup of Softball during the summer of 2018. She represented the Team USA at the 2020 Summer Olympics and won a silver medal. Takeda had four hits and drove in a run for Team USA. She had two of her hits during the gold medal game that Team USA lost to Team Japan 2–0.

== Personal life ==
Takeda is married to professional baseball pitcher Jake Reed. Janie Reed, along with her husband Jake Reed, own and operate The Clubhouse Diamond Training Facility "San Diego's only 24/7 Batting Cage Facility" in El Cajon, CA.

== Statistics ==
Oregon Ducks
YEAR	G	AB	R	H	BA	RBI	HR	3B	2B	TB	SLG	BB	SO	SB	SBA
2012	59	186	38	60	.322	17	0	1	5	67	.360%	9	31	16	20
2013	61	208	54	92	.442	43	5	1	12	121	.581%	8	15	31	37
2014	66	209	45	81	.387	40	1	8	14	114	.545%	20	8	20	24
2015	55	185	56	76	.411	31	5	3	11	108	.584%	14	17	35	38
TOTALS	241	788	204	309	.392	131	11	13	42	410	.520%	51	71	102	119

Team USA
YEAR	G	AB	R	H	BA	RBI	HR	3B	2B	TB	SLG	BB	SO	SB
2020	16	44	19	21	.477	6	0	1	3	26	.591%	4	6	1
2021	31	92	18	25	.271	12	1	0	1	29	.315%	4	9	12
Olympics	6	16	0	4	.250	1	0	1	0	6	.375%	0	2	0
TOTAL	53	152	37	50	.329	19	1	2	4	61	.401%	8	17	13

Athletes Unlimited Softball
YEAR	G	AB	R	H	BA	RBI	HR	3B	2B	TB	SLG	BB	SO	SB
2020	15	50	1	15	.300	2	1	1	1	21	.420%	2	8	1
