= Kelsey Stewart-Hunter =

American softball player

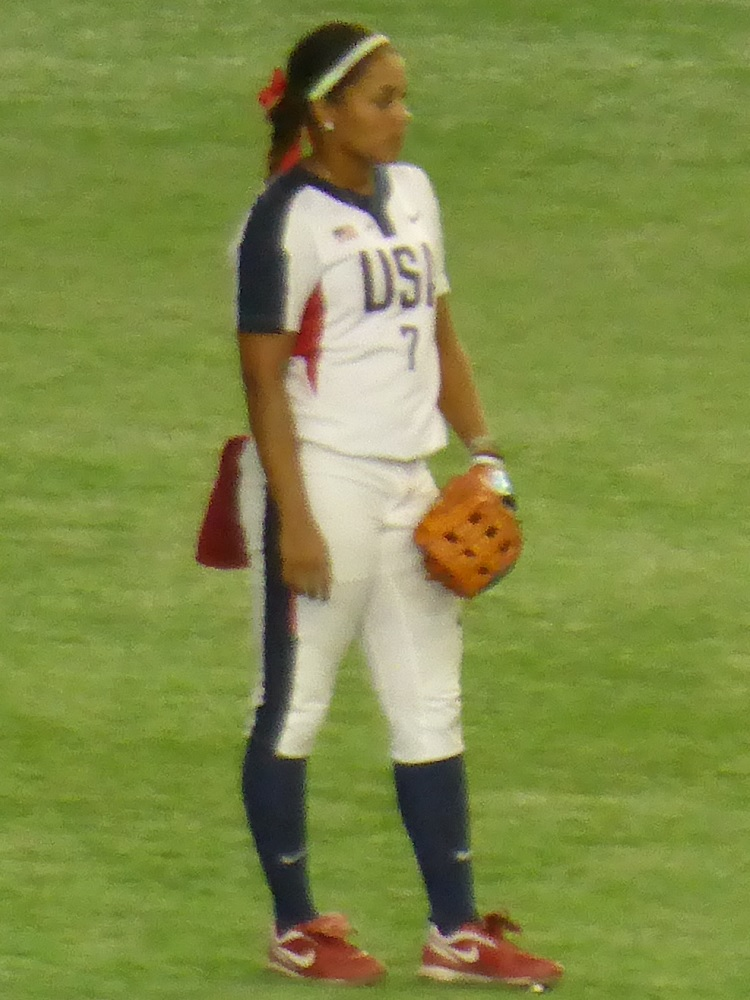
- Stewart-Hunter in 2016

Texas Volts
- Born: August 15, 1994 (age 31); Wichita, Kansas, U.S.

Teams
- Florida Gators (2013–2016); Texas Volts (2025–present)

Career highlights and awards
- NFCA First Team All-American (2014–2015); NFCA All-Southeast Region Second Team (2013–2015); SEC Player of the Year (2015); All-SEC First Team (2014–2015); SEC All-Defensive Team (2014–2015); All-SEC Second Team (2013); SEC All-Freshman Team (2013)
Medals
Women's softball
Representing United States
Olympic Games
Silver medal – second place	2020 Tokyo	Team
ISF Women's World Championship
Gold medal – first place	2016 South Surrey
Gold medal – first place	2018 Chiba
Silver medal – second place	2014 Haarlem
Silver medal – second place	2015 Toronto
World Cup of Softball
Silver medal – second place	2016 Oklahoma City
Silver medal – second place	2017 Oklahoma City
Japan Softball Cup
Gold medal – first place	2015 Japan
Silver medal – second place	2016 Ogaki City
Silver medal – second place	2017 Takasaki City
Canada Cup
Silver medal – second place	2014 South Surrey

Kelsey Christine Stewart-Hunter (née Stewart; born August 15, 1994) is an American professional softball player for the Texas Volts of the Athletes Unlimited Softball League (AUSL). She won two softball National Championships with Florida Gators softball and has been named a Second Team and two-time First Team All-SEC player, including being named 2015 SEC Player of the Year. She was also chosen a National Fastpitch Coaches Association First Team All-American in 2014–15. She graduated as a member of the select 300 hits, 200 runs, 100 stolen bases club. She has been of the United States women's national softball team since 2014. She was a member of the national softball team that won the silver medal at the 2020 Summer Olympics. She later played in the Athletes Unlimited Softball and in 2021 was the third best individual points leader for the league.

== Early life ==
Stewart grew up in Wichita, Kansas. She graduated from Maize High School in 2012.

== Career ==
Stewart played college softball at Florida. During her senior year in 2016, she was one of two active players in the country with 300-plus hits, 200-plus runs and 100-plus stolen bases. She is Florida's all-time leader in hits runs scored (259), total bases (509), hits (357), triples (29), stolen bases (113), batting average (.393) and on-base percentage (.458).

On January 29, 2025, Stewart was drafted thirty-six overall by the Volts in the inaugural Athletes Unlimited Softball League draft.

== National team ==
Stewart represented the United States women's national softball team at the 2020 Summer Olympics. During the tournament she had two hits, including the only home run for Team USA. Stewart and Team USA lost in the gold medal game to Team Japan.

== Statistics ==
Florida Gators
YEAR	G	AB	R	H	BA	RBI	HR	3B	2B	TB	SLG	BB	SO	SB	SBA
2013	67	238	62	90	.378	30	3	10	9	128	.538%	29	35	36	39
2014	67	233	68	102	.438	57	7	6	14	149	.639%	24	23	35	40
2015	67	232	71	101	.435	41	2	11	19	148	.638%	21	21	26	28
2016	63	211	58	64	.303	20	3	2	7	84	.398%	28	16	15	16
TOTALS	264	914	259	357	.390	148	15	29	49	509	.557%	102	95	112	123

Team USA
YEAR	G	AB	R	H	BA	RBI	HR	3B	2B	TB	SLG	BB	SO	SB
2020	15	35	14	13	.371	7	1	1	3	21	.600%	8	4	1
2021	19	77	12	19	.247	11	1	1	5	29	.376%	7	7	1
Olympics	6	15	1	2	.133	1	1	0	0	5	.333%	0	2	0
TOTAL	40	127	27	34	.267	19	3	2	8	55	.433%	15	13	2
