= Softball at the Pan American Games =

- No. of events: 2 (men: 1; women: 1)

Softball tournaments have been held at the Pan American Games since 1979. The men's tournament was discontinued after the 2003 Pan American Games, but made a comeback for the 2015 Pan American Games.

== Men's tournament ==
Year	Host	Gold	Silver	Bronze
1979; Details	(Puerto Rico); San Juan	Canada	United States	Puerto Rico
1983; Details	(Venezuela); Caracas	Canada	United States	Panama
1987; Details	(United States); Indianapolis	Canada	United States	Cuba
1991; Details	(Cuba); Havana	Canada	United States	Cuba
1995; Details	(Argentina); Mar del Plata	Canada	United States	Cuba
1999; Details	(Canada); Winnipeg	Canada	United States	Cuba
2003; Details	(Dominican Republic); Santo Domingo	Canada	United States	Argentina
2015; Details	(Canada); Toronto	Canada	Venezuela	Argentina
2019; Details	(Peru); Lima	Argentina	United States	Mexico

== Women's tournament ==
Year	Host	Gold	Silver	Bronze	Fourth place
1979; Details	(Puerto Rico); San Juan	United States	Puerto Rico	Belize	Canada
1983; Details	(Venezuela); Caracas	Canada	United States	Belize	Puerto Rico
1987; Details	(United States); Indianapolis	United States	Puerto Rico	Canada	Venezuela
1991; Details	(Cuba); Havana	United States	Canada	Cuba	Puerto Rico
1995; Details	(Argentina); Mar del Plata	United States	Puerto Rico	Cuba	Canada
1999; Details	(Canada); Winnipeg	United States	Canada	Cuba	Colombia
2003; Details	(Dominican Republic); Santo Domingo	United States	Canada	Dominican Republic	Cuba
2007; Details	(Brazil); Rio de Janeiro	United States	Canada; Venezuela	None	Cuba
2011; Details	(Mexico); Guadalajara	United States	Canada	Cuba	Venezuela
2015; Details	(Canada); Toronto	Canada	United States	Puerto Rico	Brazil
2019; Details	(Peru); Lima	United States	Canada	Puerto Rico	Mexico
2023; Details	(Chile); Santiago	United States	Puerto Rico	Canada	Mexico

=== Participating nations ===
Nation	1979	1983	1987	1991	1995	1999	2003	2007	2011	2015	2019	2023	Years
Argentina					6			5	8				3
Bahamas					7	6	8						3
Bermuda	=5												1
Belize	3rd place, bronze medalist(s)	3rd place, bronze medalist(s)	6										3
Brazil								7		4			2
Canada	4	1st place, gold medalist(s)	3rd place, bronze medalist(s)	2nd place, silver medalist(s)	4	2nd place, silver medalist(s)	2nd place, silver medalist(s)	2nd place, silver medalist(s)	2nd place, silver medalist(s)	1st place, gold medalist(s)	2nd place, silver medalist(s)	3rd place, bronze medalist(s)	12
Chile												8	1
Colombia						4	8	6					3
Cuba				3rd place, bronze medalist(s)	3rd place, bronze medalist(s)	3rd place, bronze medalist(s)	4	4	3rd place, bronze medalist(s)	5		5	8
Dominican Republic	7						3rd place, bronze medalist(s)		5	6			4
El Salvador	=5		7										2
Mexico									6		4	4	3
Netherlands Antilles		6	5	6	5	5							5
Nicaragua					8								1
Peru			8								6	7	2
Puerto Rico	2nd place, silver medalist(s)	4	2nd place, silver medalist(s)	4	2nd place, silver medalist(s)		7	7	7	3rd place, bronze medalist(s)	3rd place, bronze medalist(s)	2nd place, silver medalist(s)	11
United States	1st place, gold medalist(s)	2nd place, silver medalist(s)	1st place, gold medalist(s)	1st place, gold medalist(s)	1st place, gold medalist(s)	1st place, gold medalist(s)	1st place, gold medalist(s)	1st place, gold medalist(s)	1st place, gold medalist(s)	2nd place, silver medalist(s)	1st place, gold medalist(s)	1st place, gold medalist(s)	12
Venezuela		5	4	5			5	2nd place, silver medalist(s)	4		5	6	8
Nations	7	6	8	8	6	6	8	8	8	6	6	8	

== Medal table ==
Rank	Nation	Gold	Silver	Bronze	Total
1	United States	10	10	0	20
2	Canada	10	6	2	18
3	Argentina	1	0	2	3
4	Puerto Rico	0	4	3	7
5	Venezuela	0	2	0	2
6	Cuba	0	0	8	8
7	Belize	0	0	2	2
8	Dominican Republic	0	0	1	1
8	Mexico	0	0	1	1
8	Panama	0	0	1	1
Totals (10 entries)		21	22	20	63
