= Canada women's national softball team =

Information
- Country: Canada
- Federation: Softball Canada
- Confederation: WBSC Americas
- WBSC World Rank: 4 (31 December 2025)

Olympic Games
- Appearances: 5 (First in 1996)
- Best result: (bronze) 3rd (1 time, in 2020)

Women's Softball World Cup
- Appearances: 16 (First in 1970)
- Best result: (silver) 2nd (1 time, in 1978)
Medal record
Representing Canada
Softball at the Summer Olympics
Bronze medal – third place	2020 Tokyo	Team
Softball at the Summer Universiade
Gold medal – first place	2007 Bangkok
Women's World Cup
Silver medal – second place	1978 San Salvador
Bronze medal – third place	2010 Caracas
Bronze medal – third place	2016 Surrey
Bronze medal – third place	2018 Chiba
Bronze medal – third place	2024 Castions di Strada
Softball at the World Games
Silver medal – second place	1981 Santa Clara
Softball at the Pan American Games
Gold medal – first place	1983 Caracas	Team
Gold medal – first place	2015 Toronto	Team
Silver medal – second place	1991 Havanna	Team
Silver medal – second place	1999 Winnipeg	Team
Silver medal – second place	2003 Santo Domingo	Team
Silver medal – second place	2007 Rio de Janeiro	Team
Silver medal – second place	2019 Lima	Team
Bronze medal – third place	1987 Indianapolis	Team
Bronze medal – third place	2023 Santiago	Team
Canada Cup
Gold medal – first place	1996 Surrey, BC, Canada
Silver medal – second place	2006 Surrey, BC, Canada
Silver medal – second place	2009 Surrey, BC, Canada
World Cup of Softball
Bronze medal – third place	2006 Oklahoma City, OK, US
Bronze medal – third place	2007 Oklahoma City, OK, US
Bronze medal – third place	2009 Oklahoma City, OK, US
Bronze medal – third place	2011 Oklahoma City, OK, US
Bronze medal – third place	2012 Oklahoma City, OK, US
Silver medal – second place	2014 Irvine, CA, US
Bronze medal – third place	2017 Oklahoma City, OK, US

Canada's women's national softball team represents Canada in international softball. They are overseen by Softball Canada, the governing body of softball in Canada.

They are one of the top-ranked softball teams in the world. The team represents Canada at international competitions such as the ISF World Championship, World Cup and Pan-Am Games events and competed at the Summer Olympic Games since the sport was inaugurated at the 1996 Summer Olympics in Atlanta. The team won bronze at the 2020 Summer Olympics, in Tokyo; this was the fifth Olympics to include softball (no softball in 2012 nor 2016). The team won gold at the 1983 Pan American Games in Caracas and the 2015 Pan American Games in Toronto. The team won bronze at the 2018 World Championship.

== Team ==
The Canadian roster of 15 athletes was named on 12 May 2021, including four members of the last team that competed at the Olympics (Lawrie, Rafter, Regula and Sailing).

Softball at the 2020 Summer Olympics – Canada roster
Players		Coaches
Pitchers: 15 Danielle Lawrie; 17 Sara Groenewegen; 29 Jenna Caira; 38 Lauren Bay-Regula	Catchers: 2 Natalie Wideman; 55 Kaleigh Rafter; Infielders: 1 Kelsey Harshman; 5 Joey Lye; 7 Jennifer Salling; 14 Janet Leung; 19 Emma Entzminger; Outfielders: 3 Erika Polidori; 8 Victoria Hayward; 25 Jennifer Gilbert; 26 Larissa Franklin	Manager: 0 Mark Smith; Coaches: Lonni Alameda; Mel Basilio; Chris Jones

== Competitive record ==
Champions Runners-up Third place Fourth place Tournament played fully or partially on home soil

=== Olympic Games ===
Olympic Games record
Year	Round	Position	Pld	W	L	RF	RA	Squad
(United States) 1996	Group stage	5th	7	3	4	15	17	Squad
(Australia) 2000	Group stage	8th	7	1	6	6	30	Squad
(Greece) 2004	Group stage	5th	7	3	4	6	14	Squad
(China) 2008	Fourth place	4th	8	3	5	20	28	Squad
(Japan) 2020	Bronze medal	3rd	6	4	2	22	6	Squad
(United States) 2028	To be determined							
Total	Bronze medal	5/5	35	14	21	69	95	—

=== Women's World Cup ===
Women's World Cup record
Year	Round	Position	Pld	W	L	GF	GA	Squad
(Australia) 1965	Did not enter							
(Japan) 1970	First round	8th	8	2	6			Squad
(United States) 1974	Round robin	7th	7	4	3			Squad
(El Salvador) 1978	Runners-up	2nd	9	8	1			Squad
(Chinese Taipei) 1982	Round robin	8th	8	6	2			Squad
(New Zealand) 1986	Fourth place	4th	12	7	5			Squad
(United States) 1990	Round robin	7th	9	6	3			Squad
(Canada) 1994	Fourth place	4th	10	7	3	76	9	Squad
(Japan) 1998	Fifth place	5th	11	7	4	29	15	Squad
(Canada) 2002	Group stage	9th	7	3	4	14	11	Squad
(China) 2006	Fifth place	5th	10	8	2	37	15	Squad
(Venezuela) 2010	Third place	3rd	11	8	3	57	35	Squad
(Netherlands) 2014	Fourth place	4th	10	7	3	45	18	Squad
(Canada) 2016	Third place	3rd	10	8	2	60	23	Squad
(Japan) 2018	Third place	3rd	11	8	3	74	10	Squad
(Italy) 2024	Third place	3rd	12	8	4	56	48	Squad
(Australia) 2027	In progress		6	5	1	47	19	Squad
Total	Runners-up	17/18	145	97	48			—N/a

=== World Games ===
World Games record
Year	Round	Position	Pld	W	L	RS	RA	Squad
(United States) 1981	Silver medal	2nd	7	3	4	8	14	Squad
(England) 1985	Did not enter							
(Chinese Taipei) 2009	Group stage	5th	5	2	3	30	38	Squad
(Colombia) 2013	Not invited							
(United States) 2022	Group stage	6th	5	2	3	24	25	Squad
(China) 2025	Fourth place	4th	5	3	2	27	27	Squad
Total	Silver medal	4/6	22	10	12	89	104	—N/a

=== Pan American Games ===
Pan American Games record
Year	Round	Position	Pld	W	L	RS	RA	Squad
(Puerto Rico) 1979	Fourth place	4th	13	9	4			Squad
(Venezuela) 1983	Gold medal	1st	14	10	4			Squad
(United States) 1987	Bronze medal	3rd	9	6	3			Squad
(Cuba) 1991	Silver medal	2nd	10	6	4			Squad
(Argentina) 1995	Fourth place	4th	11	6	6			Squad
(Canada) 1999	Silver medal	2nd	13	8	5			Squad
(Dominican Republic) 2003	Silver medal	2nd	10	6	4			Squad
(Brazil) 2007	Silver medal	2nd	4	3	1			Squad
(Mexico) 2011	Silver medal	2nd	10	7	3			Squad
(Canada) 2015	Gold medal	1st	8	6	2			Squad
(Peru) 2019	Silver medal	2nd	7	5	2			Squad
(Chile) 2023	Bronze medal	3rd	6	4	2	32	12	Squad
(Peru) 2027	To be determined							
Total	2 Gold medals	12/12	115	68	40			—N/a
