= Olga Ruyol =

Cuban softball player

Personal information
- Nationality: Cuban
- Born: 10 August 1968 (age 58)

Sport
- Sport: Softball
Medal record
Women's softball
Representing Cuba
Pan American Games
Bronze medal – third place	1991 Havana	Team
Bronze medal – third place	1995 Mar del Plata	Team
Bronze medal – third place	1999 Winnipeg	Team
Central American and Caribbean Games
Gold medal – first place	1990 Mexico City	Team
Gold medal – first place	1998 Maracaibo	Team
Bronze medal – third place	1993 Ponce	Team

Olga Ruyol (born 10 August 1968) is a Cuban softball player. She competed in the women's tournament at the 2000 Summer Olympics.
