= 2018 Women's Softball World Championship Group Stage =

The Group Stage was the first stage of the 2018 Women's Softball World Championship. Qualified teams were split into 2 groups of 8 teams each following a serpentine system based on the Women's Softball WBSC World Rankings. Teams played a round-robin within their group, the top 4 teams in each group advanced to the playoff round and the bottom 4 sent to the placement round. It was the last time the groups would compete at the same time and location as each other or the final stages.

== Group A ==
=== Standings ===
Pos	Team	Pld	W	L	PCT	GB	Qualification
1	United States	7	7	0	1.000	—	Qualification to Playoff Round
2	Puerto Rico	7	6	1	.857	1	Qualification to Playoff Round
3	Mexico	7	5	2	.714	2	Qualification to Playoff Round
4	Netherlands	7	3	4	.429 (Note: Netherlands won against Chinese Taipei 6-5)	4	Qualification to Playoff Round
5	Chinese Taipei	7	3	4	.429	4	Advance to Placement Round
6	New Zealand	7	2	5	.286 (Note: New Zealand won against Philippines 2-0)	5	Advance to Placement Round
7	Philippines	7	2	5	.286	5	Advance to Placement Round
8	South Africa	7	0	7	.000	7	Advance to Placement Round

Source: World Baseball Softball Confederation

=== Boxscores ===
==== Day 2 ====
3 August 10:00 at Akitsu Baseball Field, Narashino
Team	1	2	3	4	R	H	E
Chinese Taipei	6	0	2	13	21	19	1
South Africa	0	0	0	0	0	2	2
WP: An-Ju Chiu (1-0) LP: Marian Van Der Merwe (0-1); Home runs: TPE: Yi-Ting Yang, Feng-Chen Lin, Chia-Yi Chen (2); RSA: None; Attendance: 200; Boxscore

3 August 15:30 at NASPA Stadium, Narita
Team	1	2	3	4	5	6	7	R	H	E
Netherlands	3	1	0	0	1	0	0	5	6	2
Puerto Rico	0	0	2	3	0	1	X	6	8	1
WP: Meghan King (1-0) LP: Ilona Andringa (0-1); Home runs: NED: Britt Vonk, Jessie Van Aalst; PUR: Aleshia Ocasio; Attendance: 250; Boxscore

3 August 18:00 at Akitsu Baseball Field, Narashino
Team	1	2	3	4	5	6	7	R	H	E
Chinese Taipei	2	0	1	0	0	3	1	7	10	1
New Zealand	0	0	0	1	0	3	0	4	6	1
WP: Ying-Hsin Lin (1-0) LP: Rita Hokianga (0-1); Home runs: TPE: Szu-Shih Li, Chia-Yi Chen; NZL: None; Attendance: 200; Boxscore

3 August 12:30 at Akitsu Baseball Field, Narashino
Team	1	2	3	4	5	6	7	R	H	E
Mexico	0	0	0	0	0	0	2	2	5	2
United States	0	0	2	0	0	3	X	5	5	1
WP: Monica Abbott (1-0) LP: Cheya Tarango-Mackey (0-1) Sv: Kelly Barnhill (1); Home runs: MEX: None; USA: Haylie McCleney; Attendance: 325; Boxscore

3 August 15:30 at Akitsu Baseball Field, Narashino
Team	1	2	3	4	R	H	E
South Africa	0	0	0	0	0	2	2
Philippines	0	6	0	4	10	12	0
WP: Sierra Lange (1-0) LP: Madlein Bester (0-1); Home runs: RSA: None; PHI: Arianne Vallestero; Attendance: 105; Boxscore

==== Day 3 ====
4 August 10:00 at Zett. A. Ball Park, Ichihara
Team	1	2	3	4	5	R	H	E
South Africa	0	0	0	0	0	0	1	0
Puerto Rico	0	5	4	0	X	9	10	0
WP: Xeana Dung (1-0) LP: Madelein Bester (0-2); Home runs: RSA: None; PUR: Carsyn Gordon; Attendance: 0 Boxscore

4 August 15:30 at Zett. A. Ball Park, Ichihara
Team	1	2	3	4	5	R	H	E
United States	0	5	0	2	0	7	8	0
Chinese Taipei	0	0	0	0	0	0	3	0
WP: Keilani Ricketts (1-0) LP: Ya-Ting Tu (0-1); Home runs: USA: Delaney Spaulding; TPE: None; Attendance: 175; Boxscore

4 August 18:00 at Zett. A. Ball Park, Ichihara
Team	1	2	3	4	5	6	7	R	H	E
Philippines	0	0	0	0	0	0	0	0	0	1
Puerto Rico	0	0	1	0	2	0	X	3	4	0
WP: Giselle Juarez (1-0) LP: Riflayca Basa; Attendance: 190; Boxscore

4 August 12:30 at Zett. A. Ball Park, Ichihara
Team	1	2	3	4	5	6	7	R	H	E
Mexico	0	1	1	0	0	0	0	2	6	1
Philippines	0	0	0	0	0	0	0	0	0	1
WP: Dallas Escobedo (1-0) LP: Mary Antolihao (0-1); Home runs: MEX: Brig Delponte-Gordoa; PHI: None; Attendance: 200; Boxscore

4 August 18:00 at Akitsu Baseball Field, Narashino
Team	1	2	3	4	5	6	7	R	H	E
Netherlands	2	0	2	1	0	0	5	10	9	0
New Zealand	0	0	0	0	0	5	0	5	6	1
WP: Ilona Andringa (1-1) LP: Nyree White (0-1); Home runs: NED: Britt Vonk, Chantal Versluis; NZL: None; Attendance: 200; Boxscore

==== Day 4 ====
5 August 10:00 at Akitsu Baseball Field, Narashino
Team	1	2	3	4	R	H	E
United States	0	0	3	8	11	12	0
Netherlands	0	0	0	0	0	0	0
WP: Monica Abbott (2-0) LP: Rebecca Soumeru (0-1); Home runs: USA: Janette Reed, Alison Aguilar, Aubree Muunro; NED: None; Attendance: 408; Boxscore

5 August 15:30 at Akitsu Baseball Field, Narashino
Team	1	2	3	4	5	6	7	R	H	E
Philippines	2	0	0	1	0	2	0	5	8	0
Netherlands	0	2	2	0	0	0	0	4	10	1
WP: Sierra Lange (2-0) LP: Eva Voortman (0-1); Home runs: PHI: Chelsea Suitos; NED: Laura Wissink, Maxime Van Dalen; Attendance: 135; Boxscore

5 August 18:00 at Akitsu Baseball Field, Narashino
Team	1	2	3	4	5	R	H	E
New Zealand	0	0	0	0	0	0	2	0
United States	2	2	0	1	2	7	9	0
WP: Kelly Barnhill (1-0) LP: Rita Hokianga (0-2); Home runs: NZL: None; USA: Kristi Merritt; Attendance: 164; Boxscore

5 August 12:30 at Akitsu Baseball Field, Narashino
Team	1	2	3	4	5	6	7	R	H	E
Puerto Rico	2	1	4	0	0	5	0	12	13	1
Chinese Taipei	0	1	6	2	2	0	0	11	14	0
WP: Taran Alvelo (1-0) LP: Chia-Chen Tsai (0-1); Home runs: PUR: Aleshia Ocasio (2), Carsyn Gordon; TPE: Feng-Chen Lin; Attendance: 251; Boxscore

5 August 15:30 at Zett. A. Ball Park, Ichihara
Team	1	2	3	4	5	R	H	E
South Africa	0	0	0	0	0	0	1	0
Mexico	4	0	3	1	X	8	12	0
WP: Sie Hyland-Banuelos (1-0) LP: Marian Van Der Merwe (0-2); Attendance: 160; Boxscore

==== Day 5 ====
6 August 10:00 at NASPA Stadium, Narita
Team	1	2	3	4	5	6	R	H	E
Mexico	0	0	0	0	0	0	0	5	1
Puerto Rico	3	2	0	0	0	4	9	8	0
WP: Aleshia Ocasio (1-0) LP: Cheya Tarango-Mackey (0-2); Home runs: MEX: None; PUR: Jena Cozza, Karla Claudio-Rivera, Carsyn Gordon; Attendance: 176; Boxscore

6 August 15:30 at NASPA Stadium, Narita
Team	1	2	3	4	5	6	7	R	H	E
Chinese Taipei	1	3	0	0	0	1	0	5	8	2
Netherlands	0	0	4	0	0	1	1	6	12	1
WP: Rebecca Soumeru (1-1) LP: Su-Hua Lin (0-1); Home runs: TPE: None; NED: Soclaina Van Gurp; Attendance: 173; Boxscore

6 August 12:30 at NASPA Stadium, Narita
Team	1	2	3	4	5	6	7	R	H	E
New Zealand	1	0	0	0	3	2	0	6	12	1
South Africa	0	0	0	0	0	0	0	0	2	3
WP: Courtney Gettins (1-0) LP: Madelein Bester (0-3) Sv: Nyree White (1); Home runs: NZL: None; RSA: None; Attendance: 70; Boxscore

6 August 18:00 at NASPA Stadium, Narita
Team	1	2	3	4	R	H	E
United States	1	3	5	3	12	9	0
Philippines	0	0	0	0	0	2	1
WP: Danielle O'Toole (1-0) LP: Mary Antolihao (0-2); Home runs: USA: Haylie McCleney, Aubree Munro; PHI: None; Attendance: 146; Boxscore

==== Day 6 ====
7 August 10:00 at Zett. A. Ball Park, Ichihara
Team	1	2	3	4	5	6	7	R	H	E
New Zealand	0	0	0	0	1	0	0	1	3	1
Puerto Rico	0	1	0	2	0	1	X	4	7	1
WP: Meghan King (2-0) LP: Rita Hokianga (0-3) Sv: Giselle Juarez (1); Home runs: NZL: Kyla Bromhead; PUR: Shemiah Sanchez; Attendance: 55; Boxscore

7 August 12:30 at Zett. A. Ball Park, Ichihara
Team	1	2	3	4	5	6	7	R	H	E
Netherlands	0	0	0	0	0	0	0	0	2	1
Mexico	0	0	0	0	1	0	X	1	2	1
WP: Dalla Escobedo-Gosch (2-0) LP: Ilona Andringa (1-2); Home runs: NED: None; MEX: None; Attendance: 156; Boxscore

7 August 18:00 at Zett. A. Ball Park, Ichihara
Team	1	2	3	4	5	6	7	R	H	E
New Zealand	0	0	0	0	0	0	0	0	0	0
Mexico	0	0	0	1	0	0	X	1	4	0
WP: Dalla Escobedo-Gosch (3-0) LP: Taylor Stewart (0-1); Home runs: NZL: None; MEX: Aniss Urtez-Harrison; Attendance: 122; Boxscore

7 August 12:30 at NASPA Stadium, Narita
Team	1	2	3	4	5	6	7	R	H	E
Philippines	3	1	0	0	1	2	0	7	7	3
Chinese Taipei	5	1	1	1	0	1	X	9	15	2
WP: An-Ju Chiu (2-0) LP: Mary Antolihao (0-3) Sv: Su-Hua Lin (1); Home runs: PHI: Hailey Decker, Francesca Guevarra; TPE: Chia-Yi Chen; Attendance: 76; Boxscore

7 August 15:30 at Zett. A. Ball Park, Ichihara
Team	1	2	3	4	5	R	H	E
South Africa	0	0	0	0	0	0	0	0
United States	1	3	1	2	X	7	9	0
WP: Rachel Garcia (1-0) LP: Marian Van Der Merwe (0-3); Home runs: RSA: None; USA: Sahvanna Jaquish, Kristi Merritt; Attendance: 132; Boxscore

==== Day 7 ====
8 August 10:00 at Zett. A. Ball Park, Ichihara
Team	1	2	3	4	5	R	H	E
Puerto Rico	0	1	0	0	0	1	1	0
United States	0	0	4	3	1	8	10	0
WP: Monica Abbott (3-0) LP: Aleshia Ocasio (1-1); Home runs: PUR: Karla Claudio-Rivera; USA: Alison Aguilar, Sahvanna Jaquish; Attendance: 55; Boxscore

8 August 12:30 at Zett. A. Ball Park, Ichihara
Team	1	2	3	4	5	6	7	R	H	E
Mexico	0	3	0	0	1	0	0	4	10	0
Chinese Taipei	0	0	0	2	1	0	0	3	8	1
WP: Dalla Escobedo-Gosch (4-0) LP: Ya-Ting Tu (0-2); Home runs: MEX: None; TPE: Szu-Shih Li; Attendance: 45; Boxscore

==== Day 8 ====
9 August 14:30 at Akitsu Baseball Field, Narashino
Team	1	2	3	4	5	R	H	E
Netherlands	2	0	2	3	4	11	12	1
South Africa	0	0	0	0	1	1	4	2
WP: Ginger De Weert (1-0) LP: Madelein Bester (0-4); Home runs: NED: Britt Vonk, Maxime Van Dalen; RSA: None; Attendance: 175; Boxscore

9 August 15:30 at NASPA Stadium, Narita
Team	1	2	3	4	5	6	7	R	H	E
Philippines	0	0	0	0	0	0	0	0	1	0
New Zealand	0	0	1	0	1	0	X	2	5	0
WP: Courtney Gettins (2-0) LP: Riflayca Basa (0-2); Attendance: 75; Boxscore

== Group B ==
=== Standings ===
Pos	Team	Pld	W	L	PCT	GB	Qualification
1	Japan	7	7	0	1.000	—	Qualification to Playoff Round
2	Australia	7	5	2	.714 (Note: Australia won against Canada 2-0)	2	Qualification to Playoff Round
3	Canada	7	5	2	.714	2	Qualification to Playoff Round
4	Italy	7	4	3	.571 (Note: Italy won against China 7-0 in 5 innings)	3	Qualification to Playoff Round
5	China	7	4	3	.571	3	Advance to Placement Round
6	Great Britain	7	2	5	.286	5	Advance to Placement Round
7	Venezuela	7	1	6	.143	6	Advance to Placement Round
8	Botswana	7	0	7	.000	7	Advance to Placement Round

Source: World Baseball Softball Confederation

=== Boxscores ===
==== Day 1 ====
2 August 20:00 at NASPA Stadium, Narita
Team	1	2	3	4	5	6	R	H	E
Italy	0	0	0	0	0	0	0	0	4
Japan	1	0	3	1	0	4	9	11	0
WP: Yukiko Ueno (1-0) LP: Greta Cecchetti (0-1) Sv: Yamato Fujita (1); Home runs: ITA: None; JPN: Eri Yamada, Saki Yamazaki; Attendance: 1500; Boxscore

==== Day 2 ====
3 August 10:00 at Zett. A. Ball Park, Ichihara
Team	1	2	3	4	5	6	7	R	H	E
Venezuela	0	1	0	0	0	0	0	1	4	1
Australia	0	0	0	2	0	5	X	7	6	0
WP: Kaia Parnaby (1-0) LP: Michelle Floyd (0-1) Sv: Ellen Roberts (1); Home runs: VEN: Jamee Juarez; AUS: Chelsea Forkin; Attendance: 200; Boxscore

3 August 15:30 at Zett. A. Ball Park, Ichihara
Team	1	2	3	4	5	6	7	R	H	E
China	0	0	0	0	1	0	0	1	7	0
Australia	0	0	0	0	0	0	0	0	2	0
WP: Xinxing Zhao (1-0) LP: Kaia Parnaby (1-1) Sv: Lan Wang (1); Home runs: CHN: None; AUS: None; Attendance: 200; Boxscore

3 August 19:00 at NASPA Stadium, Narita
Team	1	2	3	R	H	E
Japan	3	4	13	20	11	0
Botswana	0	0	0	0	2	1
WP: Misaki Katsumata (1-0) LP: Wangu Gondo (0-1); Home runs: JPN: Yuka Ichiguchi, Yu Yamamoto, Nozomi Nagasaki (2), Hitomi Kawabata; BOT: None; Attendance: 1250; Boxscore

3 August 12:30 at Zett. A. Ball Park, Ichihara
Team	1	2	3	4	5	R	H	E
Great Britain	0	0	0	0	0	0	3	2
Canada	2	3	1	0	1	7	7	0
WP: Danielle Elai (1-0) LP: Georgina Corrick (0-1); Home runs: GBR: None; CAN: None; Attendance: 250; Boxscore

3 August 18:00 at Zett. A. Ball Park, Ichihara
Team	1	2	3	4	5	6	R	H	E
Canada	4	0	1	0	0	2	7	7	1
Venezuela	0	0	0	0	0	0	0	1	2
WP: Eujenna Caira (1-0) LP: Desiree Ybarra (0-1); Home runs: CAN: Janet Leung; VEN: None; Attendance: 200; Boxscore

==== Day 3 ====
4 August 10:00 at NASPA Stadium, Narita
Team	1	2	3	4	5	6	7	8	R	H	E
Australia	0	0	0	0	1	0	1	1	3	4	0
Italy	2	0	0	0	0	0	0	0	2	4	2
WP: Kaia Parnaby (2-1) LP: Greta Cecchetti (0-2); Home runs: AUS: None; ITA: Amanda Fama, Erika Piancastelli; Attendance: 173; Boxscore

4 August 14:30 at Akitsu Baseball Field, Narashino
Team	1	2	3	4	5	6	7	R	H	E
Venezuela	1	0	2	2	1	0	2	8	12	0
Botswana	0	0	0	0	0	0	0	0	2	1
WP: Michelle Floyd (1-1) LP: Oreabetse Mojeremane (0-1); Home runs: VEN: Yuru Alicart-Ramirez, Milagros Lozada-Lago, Miran Jimenez-Quero (2); BOT: None; Attendance: 85; Boxscore

4 August 19:00 at NASPA Stadium, Narita
Team	1	2	3	4	5	6	7	R	H	E
China	0	0	0	0	0	0	0	0	2	2
Japan	1	2	2	0	0	0	X	5	8	0
WP: Yukiko Ueno (2-0) LP: Xinxing Zhao (1-1) Sv: Yamato Fujita (2); Home runs: CHN: None; JPN: Eri Yamada; Attendance: 652; Boxscore

4 August 12:30 at NASPA Stadium, Narita
Team	1	2	3	4	5	6	7	R	H	E
Great Britain	0	0	0	0	0	0	0	0	4	0
China	0	0	0	0	0	1	X	1	2	0
WP: Lan Wang (1-0) LP: Elizabeth Fleming (0-1); Home runs: GBR: None; CHN: None; Attendance: 0 Boxscore

4 August 15:30 at NASPA Stadium, Narita
Team	1	2	3	4	5	6	7	R	H	E
Italy	0	0	0	0	0	0	0	0	3	0
Canada	0	1	0	0	0	0	X	1	5	0
WP: Sara Plourde (1-0) LP: Greta Cecchetti (0-3) Sv: Danielle Lawrie (1); Attendance: 200; Boxscore

==== Day 4 ====
5 August 12:30 at Zett. A. Ball Park, Ichihara
Team	1	2	3	4	5	R	H	E
Botswana	0	0	0	0	0	0	3	1
Italy	2	0	3	3	X	8	7	2
WP: Alice Nicolini (1-0) LP: Oreabetse Mojermane (0-2); Home runs: BOT: None; ITA: Amanda Fama, Erika Piancastelli; Attendance: 138; Boxscore

5 August 18:00 at NASPA Stadium, Narita
Team	1	2	3	4	5	6	7	R	H	E
China	0	3	0	1	0	0	2	6	8	0
Venezuela	0	0	0	0	0	0	0	0	4	0
WP: Lan Wang (2-0) LP: Desiree Ybarra (0-2); Attendance: 75; Boxscore

5 August 14:30 at NASPA Stadium, Narita
Team	1	2	3	4	5	6	7	R	H	E
Canada	0	0	0	0	0	0	0	0	4	1
Australia	0	1	0	0	0	1	X	2	6	2
WP: Kaia Parnaby (3-1) LP: Karissa Hovinga (0-1); Home runs: CAN: None; AUS: None; Attendance: 254; Boxscore

5 August 19:00 at Zett. A. Ball Park, Ichihara
Team	1	2	3	4	5	6	7	R	H	E
Japan	2	1	0	1	0	1	1	6	11	0
Great Britain	0	0	0	0	0	0	0	0	2	0
WP: Yamato Fujita (1-0) LP: Carling Hare (0-1); Home runs: JPN: Yu Yamamoto, Yamoto Fujita; GBR: None; Attendance: 459; Boxscore

==== Day 5 ====
6 August 10:00 at Zett. A. Ball Park, Ichihara
Team	1	2	3	4	R	H	E
Botswana	0	0	0	0	0	1	4
Australia	4	6	4	X	14	12	0
WP: Tarni Stepto (1-0) LP: Gotlamang Sixpence (0-1); Attendance: 160; Boxscore

6 August 15:30 at Zett. A. Ball Park, Ichihara
Team	1	2	3	4	5	6	7	R	H	E
Great Britain	0	0	0	0	0	0	0	0	5	0
Italy	1	0	0	0	0	0	X	1	3	1
WP: Greta Cecchetti (1-3) LP: Elizabeth Fleming (0-2); Attendance: 185; Boxscore

6 August 12:30 at Zett. A. Ball Park, Ichihara
Team	1	2	3	4	5	6	R	H	E
Canada	1	0	3	2	0	1	7	11	1
China	0	0	0	0	0	0	0	2	2
WP: Danielle Lawrie (2-0) LP: Xinxing Zhao (1-2); Attendance: 143; Boxscore

6 August 19:00 at Zett. A. Ball Park, Ichihara
Team	1	2	3	4	5	6	7	R	H	E
Venezuela	1	0	1	0	0	0	0	2	4	1
Japan	3	0	3	0	0	1	X	7	9	1
WP: Misaki Katsumata (2-0) LP: Jamee Juarez (0-1); Home runs: VEN: None; JPN: Yu Yamamoto, Yamoto Fujita; Attendance: 1453; Boxscore

==== Day 6 ====
7 August 10:00 at NASPA Stadium, Narita
Team	1	2	3	4	R	H	E
Great Britain	0	1	2	7	10	9	1
Botswana	0	0	0	0	0	3	1
WP: Carling Hare (1-1) LP: Oreabetse Mojeremane (0-3); Home runs: GBR: Nerissa Myers, Amy Moore; BOT: None; Attendance: 85; Boxscore

7 August 15:30 at Akitsu Baseball Field, Narashino
Team	1	2	3	4	5	6	7	R	H	E
Italy	0	2	1	0	0	0	0	3	9	1
Venezuela	1	0	0	0	0	0	0	1	4	1
WP: Greta Cecchetti (2-3) LP: Desiree Ybarra (0-3); Home runs: ITA: None; VEN: None; Attendance: 265; Boxscore

7 August 19:30 at Akitsu Baseball Field, Narashino
Team	1	2	3	4	5	6	7	R	H	E
Japan	0	0	2	0	0	0	0	2	3	1
Canada	0	0	0	0	0	0	0	0	4	1
WP: Yukiko Ueno (3-0) LP: Sara Plourde (1-1); Attendance: 1076; Boxscore

7 August 15:30 at NASPA Stadium, Narita
Team	1	2	3	4	R	H	E
Botswana	0	1	0	0	1	4	3
China	5	3	7	X	15	7	1
WP: Xinxing Zhao (2-2) LP: Gondo Wangu (0-2); Home runs: BOT: Kagiso Lowang; CHN: Ying Lu; Attendance: 36; Boxscore

7 August 18:00 at NASPA Stadium, Narita
Team	1	2	3	4	5	R	H	E
Australia	0	5	0	1	5	11	12	0
Great Britain	0	0	0	0	0	0	1	1
WP: Kaia Parnaby (4-1) LP: Georgina Corrick (0-2); Home runs: AUS: Stacey Porter, Taylah Tsitsikronis; GBR: None; Attendance: 93; Boxscore

==== Day 7 ====
8 August 15:30 at Zett. A. Ball Park, Ichihara
Team	1	2	3	R	H	E
Botswana	0	0	0	0	0	0
Canada	15	7	X	22	18	0
WP: Karissa Hovinga (1-1) LP: Oreabetse Mojermane (0-4); Home runs: BOT: None; CAN: Erika Polidori, Jennifer Gilbert; Attendance: 55; Boxscore

8 August 17:00 at Zett. A. Ball Park, Ichihara
Team	1	2	3	4	5	R	H	E
China	0	0	0	0	0	0	3	0
Italy	2	0	5	0	X	7	10	0
WP: Greta Cecchetti (3-3) LP: Lan Wang (2-1); Home runs: CHN: None; ITA: Erika Piancastelli; Attendance: 43; Boxscore

==== Day 8 ====
9 August 17:00 at Akitsu Baseball Field, Narashino
Team	1	2	3	4	5	6	7	R	H	E
Venezuela	0	0	2	0	0	0	0	2	7	4
Great Britain	1	0	1	1	1	1	X	5	8	1
WP: Georgina Corrick (1-2) LP: Michelle Floyd (1-2); Attendance: 323; Boxscore

9 August 20:00 at Akitsu Baseball Field, Narashino
Team	1	2	3	4	5	6	R	H	E
Australia	0	0	0	1	0	0	1	4	0
Japan	3	0	1	2	0	2	8	7	0
WP: Yukiko Ueno (4-0) LP: Ellen Roberts (0-1); Home runs: AUS: None; JPN: Eri Yamada, Yu Yamamoto, Yamato Fujita; Attendance: 1826; Boxscore
