= Kathy Arendsen =

American softball player and head coach (born 1958)

Current position
- Title: Head coach
- Record: 615–455 (.575)

Biographical details
- Born: October 10, 1958 (age 68); Zeeland, Michigan, U.S.
- Education: Grand Valley State University; Texas Woman's University; California State University, Chico

Coaching career (HC unless noted)
- 1997–2002: Mississippi State
- 2003–2009: Oregon

Head coaching record
- Overall: 615–455 (.575)
Medal record
Softball
Representing the United States
World Games
Gold medal – first place	1981 Santa Clara	Team competition

Kathy Arendsen (born October 10, 1958) is an American softball head coach and former professional player. Arendsen pitched for Holland Christian High School, where she won the state championship, before embarking on a successful collegiate and professional career. During her college years, Arendsen pitched for Texas Woman's University and California State University, Chico, where she led both teams to national championships. In recognition of her efforts, she received the 1978 Broderick Award as the nation's outstanding female athlete in softball. She was also selected to pitch for Team USA at the 1979 and 1983 Pan American Games, winning a gold and silver medal respectively.

Upon concluding her collegiate career, Arendsen played professional softball with the Raybestos Brakettes for 15 years. During this time, she earned All-American honors 13 times, won nine national championships, and three world championships. As a result of her college play, she was named the national Broderick Award winner in softball for three consecutive years. In an exhibition game, during the 1981 Major League Baseball strike, she drew the attention of Major League Baseball player Reggie Jackson, whom she struck out three times. She was also ranked by Sports Illustrated as one of the 50 greatest sports figures from Michigan in 1999.

As she concluded her professional career, Arendsen was hired to coach at Mississippi State University and the University of Oregon, the former at which she became the winningest coach in program history. Between 2003 and 2009, Arendsen led the Oregon Ducks softball team to their best start in school history and their first playoff run since the 2000 season.

== Early life ==
Arendsen was born on October 10, 1958, in Zeeland, Michigan. As a child, she idolized Joan Joyce, a softball player and pitcher for the Raybestos Brakettes, after witnessing her play at the age of 12. She began playing competitive softball at the same time and later shifted her focus to pitching at the behest of her high school coach. She originally played first base and the outfield in an adult league only under duress.

By seventh grade, Arendsen stood at 6 ft (180 cm) tall and was encouraged to play basketball by her junior high and high school coaches although she preferred softball. She played softball in junior high at Zeeland Christian and at Holland Christian High School, where she pitched them to the state championship while suffering from chickenpox. Due to the lack of opportunity for female athletes at the time, her team played in blue jeans and old basketball jerseys.

== Playing career ==
=== Collegiate ===
Arendsen completed her high school career earning all-state honors and enrolling at Grand Valley State University for one year. She had wished to attend Michigan State, whose women's softball team had just won the College World Series, but they lacked interest in recruiting her. Following the academic year, she enrolled at Texas Woman's University (TWU). She had been recruited by coach Donna Terry of the Texas Woman's Pioneers, who had met her at a softball clinic two years prior. In her first year at TWU, Arendsen pitched 55 wins and 15 losses, including 10 no-hitters and an average of 12 and 13 strikeouts per game, leading TWU to a fourth-place finish in the 1978 Women's College World Series. She tacked on a 14–1 fall season that year and received the 1978 Broderick Award as the nation's outstanding female athlete in softball. In 1979 and 1980, she again received the Broderick Award for softball. In 1979, Arendsen was recruited by the United States National team to compete with them at the 1979 Pan American Games in San Juan, where she helped them win a gold medal. Upon pitching the Pioneers to a national championship, she transferred to California State University, Chico (CSUC) where she won another national title with the Chico State Wildcats.

=== Post-collegiate ===
After graduating in 1980, Arendsen met Joyce at a softball clinic in Meriden where she impressed Joyce with her pitching skills. Joyce then encouraged her to try out for the Raybestos Brakettes, the top amateur team in the country. She earned a spot on the team and won 95 games in her first four years. She also competed at the national level during the 1981 World Games in Santa Clara, California, where she helped the United States win another first-place finish. Arendsen pitched four shutouts, culminating in a perfect game in the championship final. She returned to the Pan American Games in 1983, where she led the team to a silver medal. While continuing to play amateur softball, she accepted various assistant coaching positions at Temple University, the University of Connecticut, Northwestern University, and Yale University.

During the 1981 Major League Baseball strike, Arendsen caught the attention of Major League Baseball player Reggie Jackson. He interviewed her for a close piece on athletes during a softball camp and she later faced him in an exhibition game following her championship win at the U.S. Olympic Festival. Due to rain, she pitched to Jackson inside the Carrier Dome with limited attendance, including national television press. She struck out Jackson three times in a row, with him foul-tipping one out of the 15 pitches she threw at him. That year, her often-used windmill fastball pitch was timed with a radar gun at 96 miles per hour (154 km/h), though she and her coach were unsure of the figure's accuracy. She explained that she changes her pitch throughout the season but throws the four basic pitches: curve, rise, dropball, and change up. Arendsen also said that she felt she could pitch this way forever as it was "a natural motion."

Arendsen played with the Brakettes for 15 years, earning All-American honors 13 times and winning nine national championships and three world championships. She set numerous records with the team, including six pitching records and tied the record for strikeouts. As a result of her play, she was named the national player of the year in two consecutive years; 1980 and 1981. She was also the first softball player ever to be a finalist for the James E. Sullivan Award, given to the top amateur athlete in the country, and the youngest person to be inducted into the Amateur Softball Association Hall of Fame. Joan Moser, manager of the Allentown Patriots women's team, called Arendsen "one of the great women's softball pitchers of all time." As an amateur athlete, she worked part time as a painter and landscaper during the summer.

== Coaching career ==
Upon her retirement in 1992, Arendsen finished her career with a 338–26 record which included 79 no-hitters, 42 perfect games, 265 shutouts and a 0.15 ERA. She was later ranked by Sports Illustrated as one of the 50 greatest sports figures from Michigan. She joined the coaching staff at Mississippi State University for six years, where she rebuilt their softball program and held a 381-279 overall record.

After spending six years at Mississippi State, she joined the coaching staff at the University of Oregon following their worst season in history; having won two games out of 21. During her first year as a coach at Oregon, she led them to their best start in school history and was one of seven inductees to be added into the Michigan Sports Hall of Fame. The Oregon Ducks softball team ended their season qualifying for the NCAA Division I softball tournament and were one win away from winning the national title. This marked their first playoff run since the 2000 season. The following year, she was the only American out of 19 inductees to join the International Softball Federation Hall of Fame. She continued her success with the Ducks and became the winningest coach in program history in 2008 with a 193–120 record, exceeding Tami Brown's record of 192–172. Her seven-year tenure with the team was cut short in 2009 after experiencing their worst season since 2003.
