= Softball at the World Games =

Softball was introduced as a World Games sport at the 1981 World Games in Santa Clara and discontinued after the 1985 games in London. It was reintroduced as a women's invitational sport in 2009 in Kaohsiung after it had been removed from the Olympic Games programme, and from 2022 it was again part of the official programme.

== Medalists ==
=== Men ===
Games	Gold	Silver	Bronze
1981 Santa Clara	United States (USA)	United States (USA)	Canada (CAN)
2025 Chengdu	United States (USA); Japan (JPN)	none	Canada (CAN); Venezuela (VEN)

=== Women ===
Games	Gold	Silver	Bronze
1981 Santa Clara	United States (USA)	Canada (CAN)	Bahamas (BAH)
1985 London	United States (USA)	Chinese Taipei (TPE)	Netherlands (NED)
2009 Kaohsiung	Japan (JPN)	Chinese Taipei (TPE)	South Korea (KOR)
2013 Cali	Cuba (CUB)	Venezuela (VEN)	Colombia (COL)
2022 Birmingham	United States (USA)	Japan (JPN)	Chinese Taipei (TPE)
2025 Chengdu	United States (USA)	Chinese Taipei (TPE)	Japan (JPN)

== See also ==
- Softball at the Summer Olympics women's competitions were held in 1996, 2000, 2004, 2008 and 2020.
- Women's Softball World Cup
