= Mike White (softball) =

American softball coach (born 1967)

Current position
- Title: Head coach
- Team: Texas
- Conference: SEC
- Record: 369–105–2 (.777)

Biographical details
- Born: November 19, 1967 (age 58); Wellington, New Zealand
- Education: Mount Mercy

Coaching career (HC unless noted)
- 2003–2004: Oregon (asst.)
- 2010–2018: Oregon
- 2019–present: Texas

Head coaching record
- Overall: 804–211–3 (.791)

Accomplishments and honors

Championships
- 2× Women's College World Series champion (2025, 2026); SEC Conference Tournament Champion (2026); Big 12 Regular Season Champion (2024); 5× Pac-12 Regular Season Champions (2013, 2014, 2015, 2016, 2018)

Awards
- Big 12 Coach of the Year (2024); 3× Pac-12 Coach of the Year (2013, 2014, 2016); 3× NFCA Pacific Region Coaching Staff of the Year (2013, 2014, 2017)
Medal record
Men's softball
Representing New Zealand
Men's Softball World Championship
Gold medal – first place	1984 Midland	Team competition
Gold medal – first place	1996 Midland	Team competition
Silver medal – second place	1988 Saskatoon	Team competition
Silver medal – second place	1992 Manila / Pasig	Team competition
Representing the United States
Men's Softball World Championship
Bronze medal – third place	2000 East London	Team competition
Pan American Games
Silver medal – second place	1999 Winnipeg	Team competition

Mike White (born November 19, 1967) is a New Zealand-born American softball coach who is the current head coach at Texas.

== Early life ==
A native of New Zealand's capital of Wellington, White grew up playing multiple sports, most notably soccer and softball. In a 2023 interview, White told ESPN writer Dave Wilson that he had hopes of making the national soccer team, but a planned training trip to Fiji and New Caledonia was scuttled due to civil unrest in Fiji. He had been a star pitcher in New Zealand, a hotbed for men's fast-pitch softball, and around the time his soccer trip was canceled, he received a call from the U.S. inviting him to play softball there. At the time, men's fast-pitch had a noticeably higher profile in the U.S. than it does today.

White then spent the next decade-plus playing for various fast-pitch teams while running a resale shop in Iowa. In that day, many New Zealand men's softball players were recruited by American fast-pitch teams, typically spending a season or two in one place before moving to teams that offered more money. By contrast, White spent most of his U.S. playing career in Cedar Rapids, Iowa, attending and graduating from the local Mount Mercy University and marrying a local woman. He became a U.S. citizen in 1994. In softball, White won 70 games in world championship tournaments between 1990 and 2006, more than any other men's pitcher in that period. He pitched for 11 teams that won championships in the American Softball Association or International Softball Congress, and was named MVP of one of those organizations' tournaments five times.

== Coaching career ==
In 1997, White met Ralph Weekly, then the director of national teams for USA Softball. White expressed a wish to enter coaching, and Weekly was impressed by White's leadership potential. Weekly then spread the word about White's availability to the women's college softball community, and White would be hired by Oregon as a pitching coach in 2003. He left Oregon after two seasons, believing that being an assistant coach was not his best fit. White would spend the next several years helping to raise his three daughters, coaching their youth teams, and doing private instruction.

=== Oregon ===
White returned to Oregon after a five-year absence when he was announced as the Ducks' new head coach on June 30, 2009. In the 2010 season, White led Oregon to their first-ever Super Regional bid by beating the eight seeded Georgia Tech. In 2012, Oregon reached their second-ever Women's College World Series, where they finished 5th among eight teams. In 2013, Mike White led Oregon to their first-ever Pac-12 Conference title. In 2014, Oregon had their best ever season finishing with a program-best 56 wins and advanced to the Women's College World Series. During the 2014 season, Oregon acquired their first ever number 1 ranking and swept rival Washington for the first time. In 2015, Oregon sported a program-best 21 Pac-12 Conference wins in a season, as well as, making the Women's College World Series for the third time in four years. In 2016, Oregon won their 4th straight Pac-12 Conference title. In 2017, Oregon made the Women's College World Series and made it to the semis of WCWS. In 2018, Oregon won their 5th Pac-12 Title, and made the Women's College World Series for the 5th time, as well as, reached 50 wins for the 5th time in program history. After the 2018 season, it was announced that Mike White would accept the softball head coaching job at the University of Texas. Longtime Oklahoma softball assistant coach Melyssa Lombardi would replace White as Oregon Head Softball Coach.

=== Texas ===
On June 25, 2018, Texas hired Mike White as head coach of the Texas softball program to replace Connie Clark who was the program's only head coach.

In 2019, his first season at the helm, Texas made it to the Super Regional, falling to Alabama in 3 games.

2020's team started 24-3 before the COVID-19 pandemic cancelled the rest of the season. At the end of this shortened season, Texas was ranked number 1 in the country by Softball America and number 2 by D1Softball and ESPN.com/USA Softball Collegiate Top 25.

In the 2021 season, Texas made it to the Super Regional, coming up short to Oklahoma State.

In 2022, the Longhorns were the WCWS runner-up, losing to Oklahoma in 2 games. It was the first time the Longhorns made it back to the Women's College World Series since 2013. The 2022 Longhorns were the first team in program history to make the WCWS finals, and it marked the first time ever in NCAA softball history that an unranked team made the WCWS finals.

In 2023, Texas made it to the Super Regional, with their season ending to Tennessee.

The 2024 Longhorns won the Big 12 Softball Regular Season Championship, the team's first conference title since 2010 and their first under Mike White. The Longhorns went into the NCAA Division I softball tournament as the nation’s number 1 seed. However, the Longhorns once again came up short to Oklahoma in the WCWS finals, losing in 2 games.

In the 2025 season, Texas went on to win their first Women's College World Series championship in program history, winning the WCWS finals in 3 games over Texas Tech. This championship marked the first time a White-led team won it all at the WCWS; it was White’s 8th appearance at the WCWS (5 times at Oregon and his then-3rd time at Texas).

In the 2026 season, the Longhorns repeated as national champions, once again beating Texas Tech but this time sweeping them in 2 games. Their journey to a national championship began with a loss in their opening game of the WCWS, losing to Tennessee. Texas became only the 5th team in NCAA softball history to go on to win the WCWS title after losing their opening game; Texas went 6-0 in elimination games during the 2026 WCWS.

== Head coaching record ==
=== College ===
Record table
Season	Team	Overall	Conference	Standing	Postseason
Oregon Ducks (Pac-12 Conference) (2010–2018)
2010	Oregon	36–21	8–13	6th	NCAA Super Regional
2011	Oregon	42–16	11–10	3rd	NCAA Super Regional
2012	Oregon	45–18	12–9	3rd	Women's College World Series
2013	Oregon	50–11	19–5	1st	NCAA Super Regional
2014	Oregon	56–9–1	20–3–1	1st	Women's College World Series
2015	Oregon	51–8	21–3	1st	Women's College World Series
2016	Oregon	48–10	20–4	1st	NCAA Super Regional
2017	Oregon	54–8	17–6	2nd	Women's College World Series
2018	Oregon	53–10	21–3	1st	Women's College World Series
Oregon:		435–111–1 (.796)	149–56–1 (.726)		
Texas Longhorns (Big 12 Conference) (2019–2024)
2019	Texas	46–17	12–6	3rd	NCAA Super Regional
2020	Texas	24–3	0–0	—	Season canceled due to COVID-19
2021	Texas	43–14	12–6	3rd	NCAA Super Regional
2022	Texas	47–22–1	12–6	3rd	WCWS Runner-Up
2023	Texas	45–15–1	11–7	2nd	NCAA Super Regional
2024	Texas	55–10	23–4	1st	WCWS Runner-Up
Texas Longhorns (Southeastern Conference) (2025–present)
2025	Texas	56–12	16–8	3rd	WCWS Champion
2026	Texas	53–12	16–8	T-4th	WCWS Champion
Texas:		369–105–2 (.777)	102–45 (.694)		
Total:		804–211–3 (.791)			
National champion Postseason invitational champion Conference regular season champion Conference regular season and conference tournament champion Division regular season champion Division regular season and conference tournament champion Conference tournament champion
