= Softball at the 2011 Pan American Games =

- Venue: Pan American Softball Stadium
- Dates: October 15 – October 23
- Competitors: 134 from 8 nations

Medalists
Gold medal	United States
Silver medal	Canada
Bronze medal	Cuba

Softball at the 2011 Pan American Games in Guadalajara were held in between October 17 and 23. All games were played at the Pan American Softball Stadium. Pan American softball is competed by women only, while men compete in the similar sport of baseball. Each team can enter a team of 17 athletes for a maximum of 136 competitors for this tournament.

The United States were the defending champions from the 2007 Pan American Games in Rio de Janeiro.

On October 23, the United States defeated Canada to win its seventh straight gold medal.

== Medal summary ==
=== Medal table ===
Rank	Nation	Gold	Silver	Bronze	Total
1	United States	1	0	0	1
2	Canada	0	1	0	1
3	Cuba	0	0	1	1
Totals (3 entries)		1	1	1	3

=== Medalists ===
Event	Gold	Silver	Bronze
Women's	United States; Chelsea Thomas; Kelly Grieve; Rhea Taylor; Stacy Johnson; Jordan Taylor; Kaitlin Cochran; Keilani Ricketts; Whitney Canion; Michelle Moultrie; Christine Orgeron; Molly Johnson; Valerie Arioto; Ashley Holcombe; Lauren Gibson; Amelia Leles; Meagan May; Taylor Hoagland	Canada; Jenna Caira; Jocelyn Cater; Erin Cumpstone; Heather Ebert; Kelsey Haberl; Victoria Hayward; Ashley Lanz; Danielle Lopez; Joey Lye; Melanie Matthews; Sarah Phillips; Kaleigh Rafter; Jillian Russell; Jennifer Salling; Hannah Schwarz; Brittany Hicks; Megan Timpf; Jennifer Yee	Cuba; Ludisleydis Napoles; Marlen Bubaire; Lidibet Castellon; Anisley Lopez; Katia Coello; Maylin Sanchez; Yusmelis Ocaña; Yaleisa Soto; Yanitza Aviles; Aleanna de Armas; Maritza Toledo; Yamisleidys Casanova; Yuselys Acosta; Diamela Puentes; Yusmeri Pacheco; Yarisleidy Rosario; Leanneyi Gomez

== Schedule ==
The competition will be spread out across seven days.

Preliminary round	Semifinals	M	Event finals

October	17th Mon	18th Tue	19th Wed	20th Thu	21st Fri	22nd Sat	23rd Sun	Gold medals
Women's tournament							M	1

== Teams ==
=== Qualification ===
The top 7 teams from the 2009 Pan American Championship and hosts Mexico qualified teams for the tournament.

Event	Date	Location	Vacancies	Qualified
Host Nation	–		1	Mexico
2009 Pan American Softball Championship	July 31 – August 9, 2009	(Venezuela) Maracay	7	United States; Canada; Venezuela; Cuba; Argentina; Dominican Republic; Puerto Rico
TOTAL			8	

=== Participants ===
- Argentina
- Canada
- Cuba
- Dominican Republic
- Mexico
- Puerto Rico
- United States
- Venezuela

== Competition format ==
Eight teams compete in the Pan American softball tournament, and the competition consists of two rounds. The preliminary round follows a round robin format, where each of the teams plays all the other teams once. Following this, the top four teams advance to a page playoff system round consisting of two semifinal games, and finally the bronze and gold medal games.

== Preliminary round ==
Qualified for the semifinals
Eliminated

All times are Central Daylight Time (UTC−5)

Rank	Team	W	L	RS	RA
1	United States	7	0	54	6
2	Cuba	5	2	28	13
3	Venezuela	5	2	31	20
4	Canada	5	2	46	23
5	Dominican Republic	2	5	22	37
6	Mexico	2	5	18	37
7	Puerto Rico	2	5	27	42
8	Argentina	0	7	4	59

=== Schedule ===
October 17, 2011; 9:00	Dominican Republic	2 – 3	Puerto Rico	Pan American Softball Stadium, Guadalajara; Attendance: 350
October 17, 2011; 9:00		http://200.57.183.69/ENG/SO/SOR173A_SOW40040010100001ENG.htm		Pan American Softball Stadium, Guadalajara; Attendance: 350

October 17, 2011; 11:00	Mexico	0 – 7	Venezuela	Pan American Softball Stadium, Guadalajara; Attendance: 600
October 17, 2011; 11:00		http://200.57.183.69/ENG/SO/SOR173A_SOW40040010100014ENG.htm		Pan American Softball Stadium, Guadalajara; Attendance: 600

October 17, 2011; 13:00	Argentina	0 – 7	Cuba	Pan American Softball Stadium, Guadalajara; Attendance: 100
October 17, 2011; 13:00		http://200.57.183.69/ENG/SO/SOR173A_SOW40040010100023ENG.htm		Pan American Softball Stadium, Guadalajara; Attendance: 100

October 17, 2011; 16:00	Canada	10 – 2	Puerto Rico	Pan American Softball Stadium, Guadalajara; Attendance: 300
October 17, 2011; 16:00		http://200.57.183.69/ENG/SO/SOR173A_SOW40040010100013ENG.htm		Pan American Softball Stadium, Guadalajara; Attendance: 300

October 17, 2011; 18:00	United States	10 – 0	Venezuela	Pan American Softball Stadium, Guadalajara; Attendance: 0
October 17, 2011; 18:00		http://200.57.183.69/ENG/SO/SOR173A_SOW40040010100021ENG.htm		Pan American Softball Stadium, Guadalajara; Attendance: 0

October 17, 2011; 20:00	Mexico	1 – 3	Dominican Republic	Pan American Softball Stadium, Guadalajara; Attendance: 500
October 17, 2011; 20:00		http://200.57.183.69/ENG/SO/SOR173A_SOW40040010100002ENG.htm		Pan American Softball Stadium, Guadalajara; Attendance: 500

October 18, 2011; 9:00	Venezuela	8 – 1	Argentina	Pan American Softball Stadium, Guadalajara; Attendance: 150
October 18, 2011; 9:00		http://200.57.183.69/ENG/SO/SOR173A_SOW40040010100019ENG.htm		Pan American Softball Stadium, Guadalajara; Attendance: 150

October 18, 2011; 11:00	Puerto Rico	1 – 4	Cuba	Pan American Softball Stadium, Guadalajara; Attendance: 200
October 18, 2011; 11:00		http://200.57.183.69/ENG/SO/SOR173A_SOW40040010100011ENG.htm		Pan American Softball Stadium, Guadalajara; Attendance: 200

October 18, 2011; 13:00	United States	10 – 0	Dominican Republic	Pan American Softball Stadium, Guadalajara; Attendance: 200
October 18, 2011; 13:00		http://200.57.183.69/ENG/SO/SOR173A_SOW40040010100006ENG.htm		Pan American Softball Stadium, Guadalajara; Attendance: 200

October 18, 2011; 16:00	Canada	4 – 3	Venezuela	Pan American Softball Stadium, Guadalajara; Attendance: 350
October 18, 2011; 16:00		http://200.57.183.69/ENG/SO/SOR173A_SOW40040010100022ENG.htm		Pan American Softball Stadium, Guadalajara; Attendance: 350

October 18, 2011; 18:00	Canada	2 – 4	Cuba	Pan American Softball Stadium, Guadalajara; Attendance: 773
October 18, 2011; 18:00		http://200.57.183.69/ENG/SO/SOR173A_SOW40040010100027ENG.htm		Pan American Softball Stadium, Guadalajara; Attendance: 773

October 18, 2011; 20:00	Mexico	0 – 7	United States	Pan American Softball Stadium, Guadalajara; Attendance: 785
October 18, 2011; 20:00		http://200.57.183.69/ENG/SO/SOR173A_SOW40040010100017ENG.htm		Pan American Softball Stadium, Guadalajara; Attendance: 785

October 19, 2011; 9:00	Canada	11 – 0	Argentina	Pan American Softball Stadium, Guadalajara; Attendance: 150
October 19, 2011; 9:00		http://200.57.183.69/ENG/SO/SOR173A_SOW40040010100025ENG.htm		Pan American Softball Stadium, Guadalajara; Attendance: 150

October 19, 2011; 11:00	Argentina	1 – 11	Dominican Republic	Pan American Softball Stadium, Guadalajara; Attendance: 183
October 19, 2011; 11:00		http://200.57.183.69/ENG/SO/SOR173A_SOW40040010100004ENG.htm		Pan American Softball Stadium, Guadalajara; Attendance: 183

October 19, 2011; 13:00	United States	3 – 0	Cuba	Pan American Softball Stadium, Guadalajara; Attendance: 375
October 19, 2011; 13:00		http://200.57.183.69/ENG/SO/SOR173A_SOW40040010100026ENG.htm		Pan American Softball Stadium, Guadalajara; Attendance: 375

October 19, 2011; 16:00	United States	4 – 1	Puerto Rico	Pan American Softball Stadium, Guadalajara; Attendance: 415
October 19, 2011; 16:00		http://200.57.183.69/ENG/SO/SOR173A_SOW40040010100012ENG.htm		Pan American Softball Stadium, Guadalajara; Attendance: 415

October 19, 2011; 18:00	Venezuela	3 – 2	Cuba	Pan American Softball Stadium, Guadalajara; Attendance: 659
October 19, 2011; 18:00		http://200.57.183.69/ENG/SO/SOR173A_SOW40040010100020ENG.htm		Pan American Softball Stadium, Guadalajara; Attendance: 659

October 19, 2011; 20:00	Mexico	1 – 8	Canada	Pan American Softball Stadium, Guadalajara; Attendance: 0
October 19, 2011; 20:00		http://200.57.183.69/ENG/SO/SOR173A_SOW40040010100018ENG.htm		Pan American Softball Stadium, Guadalajara; Attendance: 0

October 20, 2011; 9:00	Puerto Rico	10 – 0	Argentina	Pan American Softball Stadium, Guadalajara; Attendance: 100
October 20, 2011; 9:00		http://200.57.183.69/ENG/SO/SOR173A_SOW40040010100010ENG.htm		Pan American Softball Stadium, Guadalajara; Attendance: 100

October 20, 2011; 11:00	Venezuela	10 – 3	Dominican Republic	Pan American Softball Stadium, Guadalajara; Attendance: 150
October 20, 2011; 11:00		http://200.57.183.69/ENG/SO/SOR173A_SOW40040010100003ENG.htm		Pan American Softball Stadium, Guadalajara; Attendance: 150

October 20, 2011; 13:00	Canada	5 – 12	United States	Pan American Softball Stadium, Guadalajara; Attendance: 321
October 20, 2011; 13:00		http://200.57.183.69/ENG/SO/SOR173A_SOW40040010100028ENG.htm		Pan American Softball Stadium, Guadalajara; Attendance: 321

October 20, 2011; 16:00	Mexico	4 – 2	Argentina	Pan American Softball Stadium, Guadalajara; Attendance: 400
October 20, 2011; 16:00		http://200.57.183.69/ENG/SO/SOR173A_SOW40040010100015ENG.htm		Pan American Softball Stadium, Guadalajara; Attendance: 400

October 20, 2011; 18:00	Mexico	0 – 5	Cuba	Pan American Softball Stadium, Guadalajara; Attendance: 599
October 20, 2011; 18:00		http://200.57.183.69/ENG/SO/SOR173A_SOW40040010100016ENG.htm		Pan American Softball Stadium, Guadalajara; Attendance: 599

October 21, 2011; 9:00	Cuba	6 – 1	Dominican Republic	Pan American Softball Stadium, Guadalajara; Attendance: 150
October 21, 2011; 9:00		http://200.57.183.69/ENG/SO/SOR173A_SOW40040010100005ENG.htm		Pan American Softball Stadium, Guadalajara; Attendance: 150

October 21, 2011; 11:00	Canada	6 – 2	Dominican Republic	Pan American Softball Stadium, Guadalajara; Attendance: 185
October 21, 2011; 11:00		http://200.57.183.69/ENG/SO/SOR173A_SOW40040010100007ENG.htm		Pan American Softball Stadium, Guadalajara; Attendance: 185

October 21, 2011; 13:00	Venezuela	10 – 5	Puerto Rico	Pan American Softball Stadium, Guadalajara; Attendance: 250
October 21, 2011; 13:00		http://200.57.183.69/ENG/SO/SOR173A_SOW40040010100009ENG.htm		Pan American Softball Stadium, Guadalajara; Attendance: 250

October 21, 2011; 16:00	United States	8 – 0	Argentina	Pan American Softball Stadium, Guadalajara; Attendance: 300s
October 21, 2011; 16:00		http://200.57.183.69/ENG/SO/SOR173A_SOW40040010100024ENG.htm		Pan American Softball Stadium, Guadalajara; Attendance: 300s

October 21, 2011; 18:00	Mexico	12 – 5	Puerto Rico	Pan American Softball Stadium, Guadalajara; Attendance: 453
October 21, 2011; 18:00		http://200.57.183.69/ENG/SO/SOR173A_SOW40040010100008ENG.htm#		Pan American Softball Stadium, Guadalajara; Attendance: 453

== Medal Round ==
The loser of 1&2 seed game will play the winner of the 3&4 seed game in the bronze-medal match. The loser of the bronze-medal match wins the bronze medal while the winner goes on to play the winner of the 1&2 seed game for the gold medal in the gold-medal match.

Semifinals
1	United States	13
2	Cuba	1
3	Venezuela	1
4	Canada	11

Bronze medal game
2	Cuba	0
4	Canada	4

Gold medal game
1	United States	11
4	Canada	1

=== Semifinals ===
October 22, 2011; 16:00	Canada	11 – 1	Venezuela	Pan American Softball Stadium, Guadalajara; Attendance: 150
October 22, 2011; 16:00		http://200.57.183.69/ENG/SO/SOR173A_SOW40040030200002ENG.htm		Pan American Softball Stadium, Guadalajara; Attendance: 150

October 22, 2011; 18:00	United States	13 – 1	Cuba	Pan American Softball Stadium, Guadalajara; Attendance: 0
October 22, 2011; 18:00		http://200.57.183.69/ENG/SO/SOR173A_SOW40040030100001ENG.htm		Pan American Softball Stadium, Guadalajara; Attendance: 0

=== Bronze-medal match ===
October 23, 2011; 10:00	Cuba	0 – 4	Canada	Pan American Softball Stadium, Guadalajara; Attendance: 359
October 23, 2011; 10:00		Boxscore		Pan American Softball Stadium, Guadalajara; Attendance: 359

=== Gold-medal match ===
October 23, 2011; 12:00	United States	11 – 1	Canada	Pan American Softball Stadium, Guadalajara; Attendance: 555
October 23, 2011; 12:00		http://200.57.183.69/ENG/SO/SOR173A_SOW40040050100001ENG.htm		Pan American Softball Stadium, Guadalajara; Attendance: 555

2011 Pan American Games Softball tournament
Winners

United States
8th title

== Final standings ==
Rank	Team	Record
Gold medal	United States	9 – 0
Silver medal	Canada	7 – 3
Bronze medal	Cuba	5 – 4
4	Venezuela	5 – 3
5	Dominican Republic	2 – 5
6	Mexico	2 – 5
7	Puerto Rico	2 – 5
8	Argentina	0 – 7
