= Softball at the 2003 Pan American Games =

The men's and women's softball tournaments at the 2003 Pan American Games were held in August 2003 in Santo Domingo, Dominican Republic. Due to changes in PanAm Sports' internal criteria, this was the last edition in which the men's softball tournament was mandatory; it would only return to the program on an optional basis in 2015.

== Medal summary ==
=== Medal table ===
Rank	Nation	Gold	Silver	Bronze	Total
1	Canada	1	1	0	2
1	United States	1	1	0	2
3	Argentina	0	0	1	1
3	Dominican Republic	0	0	1	1
Totals (4 entries)		2	2	2	6

=== Medalists ===
Event	Gold	Silver	Bronze
Men's	Canada	United States	Argentina
Women's	United States	Canada	Dominican Republic
