= Melyssa Lombardi =

American softball coach

Current position
- Title: Head coach
- Team: Oregon
- Conference: Big Ten
- Record: 239–116 (.673)

Biographical details
- Born: c. 1974 (age 51–52); Glendale, Arizona, U.S.
- Education: Oklahoma

Playing career
- 1993–1994: Central Arizona College
- 1995–1996: Oklahoma
- Position: Catcher

Coaching career (HC unless noted)
- 1997: Oklahoma (Student asst.)
- 1998–2007: Oklahoma (asst.)
- 2007–2018: Oklahoma (AHC)
- 2019–present: Oregon

Head coaching record
- Overall: 239–116 (.673)

Accomplishments and honors

Championships
- As a Head Coach: Big Ten regular season (2025); As an Assistant: 4× Women's College World Series (2000, 2013, 2016, 2017); 10× Big 12 regular season (1999, 2000, 2009, 2012–18); 5× Big 12 Tournament (2001, 2007, 2010, 2017–18)

Awards
- As a Head Coach: Big Ten Coach of the Year (2025); As an Assistant: NFCA Division I Assistant Coach of the Year (2017); 4× NFCA National Coaching Staffs of the Year (2000, 2013, 2016–17); 11× Regional Coaching Staffs of the Year (1999-01, 2004, 2012–18)

Melyssa Lombardi is an American softball coach who is the current head coach at Oregon.

== Early life and education ==
Lombardi graduated from University of Oklahoma in 1997 with a degree in Health and Sports Science.

== Coaching career ==
=== Oregon ===
On July 9, 2018, Melyssa Lombardi was announced as the new head coach of the Oregon softball program, replacing Mike White who left to be the head coach of Texas.

The 2024-2025 season marked Oregon's move from the Pac-12 conference to the Big Ten, along with Washington and UCLA. Lombardi led Oregon to a 19-3 conference record, winning the Big Ten Conference Championship for the regular season. This was Oregon's first conference championship since Lombardi took over the program, their most recent championship coming in the Pac-12 in 2018. As a result, Lombardi was named the Big Ten Softball Coach of the Year.

== Controversy ==
When Lombardi became the head coach of the Oregon softball program, several players transferred from the program including Miranda Elish, Lauren Burke, Mary Iakopo, Shannon Rhodes, Megan Kleist, Maggie Balint, Alyssa Pinto, Mia Camuso, and Alexis Mack. Another player, Maddie MacGrandle, who transferred into the program that year quit the team midseason. This exodus of talented players left only one starter from the previous season's lineup still on the team, Haley Cruse. Most players did not speak publicly about their reasons for leaving but those who did cited concerns about the team culture.

In her third season with the Ducks, the NCAA gave Texas the 15-seed and did not seed the Ducks, instead sending them to the Austin Regional. Oregon and Texas met in the finals, setting up the first showdown between Lombardi's team and Mike White's team, which included Burke, Iakopo and Rhodes. Oregon won the first game 3-2 in an extra inning walk-off. Cruse scored the winning run to beat her former coach. Texas won the second game, 1-0 as the Ducks couldn't get anything going offensively. Burke scored the only run of that game. Since Oregon had already dropped a game earlier in the regional this was their second loss, eliminating them from the tournament while Texas moved on to the Super Regionals.

== Head coaching record ==
=== College ===
Record table
Season	Team	Overall	Conference	Standing	Postseason
Oregon Ducks (Pac-12 Conference) (2019–2024)
2019	Oregon	22–30	5–19	9th	
2020	Oregon	22–2	0–0		Season cancelled due to COVID-19 pandemic
2021	Oregon	40–17	14–10	3rd	NCAA Regional
2022	Oregon	33–19	10–14	5th	NCAA Regional
2023	Oregon	38–17	14–10	5th	NCAA Super Regional
2024	Oregon	30–21	13–10	4th	NCAA Regional
Oregon:		185–106 (.636)	56–63 (.471)		
Oregon Ducks (Big Ten Conference) (2025–Present)
2025	Oregon	54–10	19–3	1st	Women's College World Series
2026	Oregon	41–14	20–4	T-2nd	NCAA Regional
Oregon:		95–24 (.798)	39–7 (.848)		
Total:		280–130 (.683)			
National champion Postseason invitational champion Conference regular season champion Conference regular season and conference tournament champion Division regular season champion Division regular season and conference tournament champion Conference tournament champion
