= Yu Yamamoto =

Japanese softball player

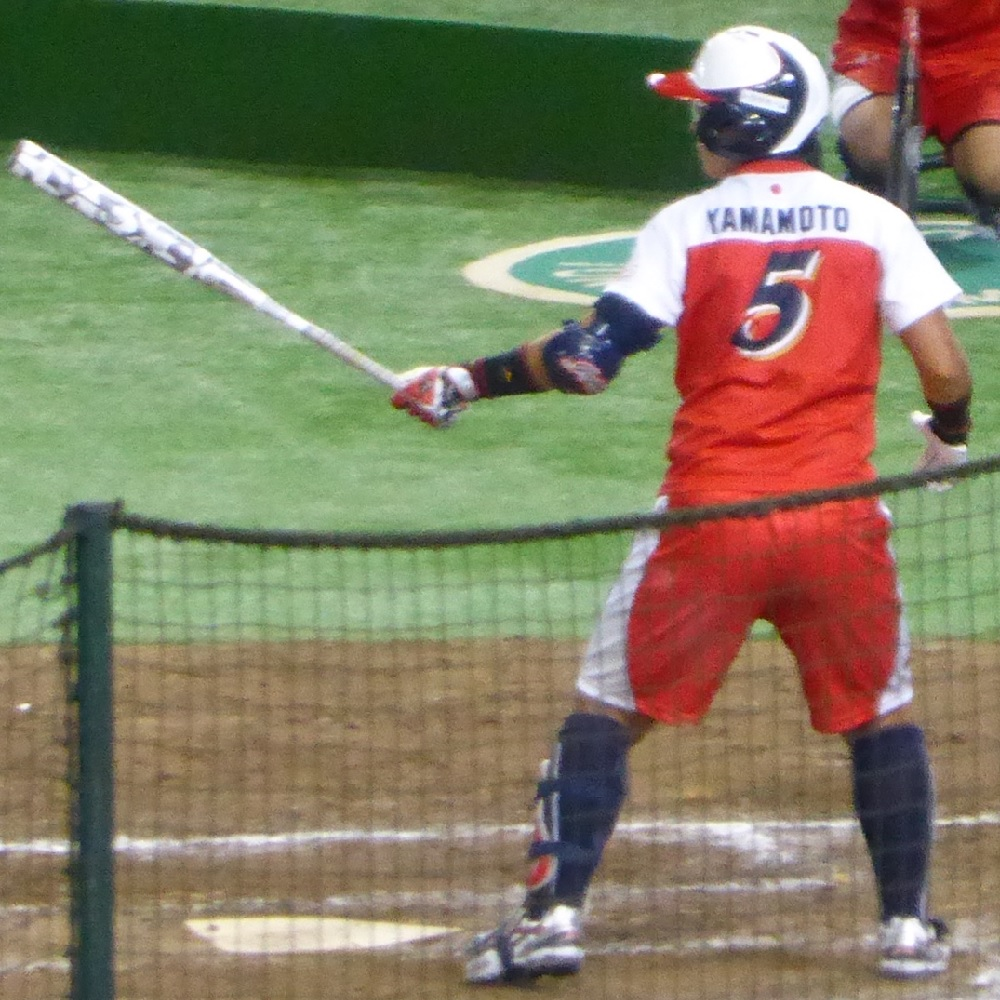

Bic Camera Takasaki Bee Queen – No. 25
- Infield
- Born: August 20, 1988 (age 37); Japan
- Bats: Right Throws: Right
Medals
Women's softball
Representing Japan
Olympic Games
Gold medal – first place	2020 Tokyo	Team
World Cup
Gold medal – first place	2014 Haarlem	Team
Silver medal – second place	2016 Surrey	Team
Silver medal – second place	2018 Chiba	Team
Asian Games
Gold medal – first place	2018 Jakarta-Palembang	Team

Yu Yamamoto (山本優, Yamamoto Yū, born 20 August 1988) is a Japanese softball player. She competed in the 2020 Summer Olympics and won a gold medal.
