= 2018 Women's Softball World Championship =

Tournament details
- Host country: Japan
- Dates: 2–12 August 2018
- Teams: 16 (from 5 continents)
- Venues: 4 (in 4 host cities)
- Defending champions: United States (2016)

Final positions
- Champions: United States (11th title)
- Runner-up: Japan
- Third place: Canada
- Fourth place: Australia

Tournament statistics
- Games played: 73
- Attendance: 44,990 (616 per game)
- Best batting average: (Chinese Taipei) Meng-Ting Lai (.526)
- Most homeruns hit: (Japan) Yu Yamamoto (6)
- Most stolen bases: (Netherlands) Britt Vonk (6)
- Best ERA: (Canada) Danielle Lawrie (0.45)
- Most strikeouts (as pitcher): (Mexico) Dalla Escobedo-Gosch (61)

The 2018 Women's Softball World Championship was an international softball competition held in Chiba, Japan, from 2 August to 12 August. It was the 16th edition of the tournament, and the third edition to be sanctioned by the World Baseball Softball Confederation (WBSC). Previous editions were sanctioned by the International Softball Federation, which governed the sport until its 2013 merger with the International Baseball Federation to create the WBSC. As the winners, the United States earned the right to compete at the 2020 Summer Olympics. It was the last world title awarded under the championship format before the WBSC implemented the new world cup 4 year cycle.

== Qualification ==
Origin	Berths	Qualified
Host nation	1	Japan
Oceania	2	Australia, New Zealand
Europe	3	Netherlands, Italy, Great Britain
Americas	5	Canada, Mexico, Puerto Rico, United States, Venezuela
Asia	3	Philippines, Chinese Taipei, China
Africa	2	Botswana, South Africa

== Venues ==
Narashino	2018 Women's Softball World Championship is located in Chiba Prefecture	Narita
Akitsu Baseball Field	2018 Women's Softball World Championship is located in Chiba Prefecture	NASPA Stadium
Playoff Round	2018 Women's Softball World Championship is located in Chiba Prefecture	
Chiba	2018 Women's Softball World Championship is located in Chiba Prefecture	Ichihara
Zozo Marine Stadium	2018 Women's Softball World Championship is located in Chiba Prefecture	Zett. A. Ball Park

== Competition format ==
The teams are separated into two groups of eight teams each for the preliminary round. Each group plays a single round robin. The top four teams in each group advance to the championship round, while the bottom four teams play in placement games. The championship round is played in a double Page round.

- Preliminary Page (two sections)
  - Minor semifinals: Third- and fourth-place teams play (A3 vs. B4, B3 vs. A4). Winners advance to Preliminary Page final, losers eliminated.
  - Major semifinals: First- and second-place teams play (A1 vs. B2, B1 vs. A2). Winners advance to Championship Page major semifinal, losers play in the Preliminary Page final.
  - Finals: The minor semifinal winners and major semifinal losers play. Winners advance to the Championship Page minor semifinal, losers eliminated.
- Championship Page
  - Minor semifinal: Winners of each Preliminary Page final play. Winner advances to Championship Page final, losers eliminated.
  - Major semifinal: Winners of each Preliminary Page major semifinal play. Winner advances to Championship Page grand final, losers play in the Championship Page final.
  - Final: The minor semifinal winners and major semifinal losers play. Winner advances to Championship Page grand final, loser finishes in third place.
  - Grand final: The major semifinal winner and final winner play. Winner is the champion, loser is second place.

The games were played with the 15/10/7 run ahead mercy rule where a game was called if one team leads the other by 15 runs or more after 3 innings, 10 runs or more after 4 innings, or 7 runs or more after 5 innings have been played.

== Group stage ==
=== Group A ===
==== Standings ====
Pos	Team	Pld	W	L	PCT	GB	Qualification
1	United States	7	7	0	1.000	—	Qualification to Playoff Round
2	Puerto Rico	7	6	1	.857	1	Qualification to Playoff Round
3	Mexico	7	5	2	.714	2	Qualification to Playoff Round
4	Netherlands	7	3	4	.429 (Note: Netherlands won against Chinese Taipei 6-5)	4	Qualification to Playoff Round
5	Chinese Taipei	7	3	4	.429	4	Advance to Placement Round
6	New Zealand	7	2	5	.286 (Note: New Zealand won against Philippines 2-0)	5	Advance to Placement Round
7	Philippines	7	2	5	.286	5	Advance to Placement Round
8	South Africa	7	0	7	.000	7	Advance to Placement Round

Source: World Baseball Softball Confederation

==== Games ====
Date	Home	Score	Away
3 August 2018	South Africa	0–21 (4)	Chinese Taipei
3 August 2018	United States	5–2	Mexico
3 August 2018	Puerto Rico	6–5	Netherlands
3 August 2018	Philippines	10–0 (4)	South Africa
3 August 2018	New Zealand	4–7	Chinese Taipei
4 August 2018	Puerto Rico	9–0 (5)	South Africa
4 August 2018	Philippines	0–2	Mexico
4 August 2018	Chinese Taipei	0–7 (5)	United States
4 August 2018	New Zealand	5–10	Netherlands
4 August 2018	Puerto Rico	3–0	Philippines
5 August 2018	Netherlands	0–11 (4)	United States
5 August 2018	Chinese Taipei	11–12	Puerto Rico
5 August 2018	Netherlands	4–5	Philippines
5 August 2018	Mexico	8–0 (5)	South Africa
5 August 2018	United States	7–0 (5)	New Zealand
6 August 2018	Puerto Rico	9–0 (6)	Mexico
6 August 2018	South Africa	0–6	New Zealand
6 August 2018	Netherlands	6–5	Chinese Taipei
6 August 2018	Philippines	0–12 (4)	United States
7 August 2018	Puerto Rico	4–1	New Zealand
7 August 2018	Chinese Taipei	9–7	Philippines
7 August 2018	Mexico	1–0	Netherlands
7 August 2018	United States	7–0 (5)	South Africa
7 August 2018	Mexico	1–0	New Zealand
8 August 2018	United States	8–1 (5)	Puerto Rico
8 August 2018	Chinese Taipei	3–4	Mexico
9 August 2018	South Africa	1–11 (5)	Netherlands
9 August 2018	New Zealand	2–0	Philippines

=== Group B ===
==== Standings ====
Pos	Team	Pld	W	L	PCT	GB	Qualification
1	Japan	7	7	0	1.000	—	Qualification to Playoff Round
2	Australia	7	5	2	.714 (Note: Australia won against Canada 2-0)	2	Qualification to Playoff Round
3	Canada	7	5	2	.714	2	Qualification to Playoff Round
4	Italy	7	4	3	.571 (Note: Italy won against China 7-0 in 5 innings)	3	Qualification to Playoff Round
5	China	7	4	3	.571	3	Advance to Placement Round
6	Great Britain	7	2	5	.286	5	Advance to Placement Round
7	Venezuela	7	1	6	.143	6	Advance to Placement Round
8	Botswana	7	0	7	.000	7	Advance to Placement Round

Source: World Baseball Softball Confederation

==== Games ====
Date	Home	Score	Away
2 August 2018	Japan	9–0 (6)	Italy
3 August 2018	Australia	7–1	Venezuela
3 August 2018	Canada	7–0 (5)	Great Britain
3 August 2018	Australia	0–1	China
3 August 2018	Venezuela	0–7 (6)	Canada
3 August 2018	Japan	20–0 (3)	Botswana
4 August 2018	Italy	2–3	Australia
4 August 2018	China	1–0	Great Britain
4 August 2018	Botswana	0–8	Venezuela
4 August 2018	Canada	1–0	Italy
4 August 2018	Japan	5–0	China
5 August 2018	Italy	8–0 (5)	Botswana
5 August 2018	Australia	2–0	Canada
5 August 2018	Venezuela	0–6	China
5 August 2018	Great Britain	0–6	Japan
6 August 2018	Australia	14–0 (4)	Botswana
6 August 2018	China	0–7 (6)	Canada
6 August 2018	Italy	1–0	Great Britain
6 August 2018	Japan	7–2	Venezuela
7 August 2018	Botswana	0–10 (4)	Great Britain
7 August 2018	China	15–1 (4)	Botswana
7 August 2018	Venezuela	1–3	Italy
7 August 2018	Great Britain	0–11 (5)	Australia
7 August 2018	Canada	0–2	Japan
8 August 2018	Canada	22–0 (3)	Botswana
8 August 2018	Italy	7–0 (5)	China
9 August 2018	Great Britain	5–2	Venezuela
9 August 2018	Japan	9–1 (6)	Australia

== Placement round ==
13th-16th Placement
P1
A5 Chinese Taipei	8^{(6)}
B8 Botswana	1
P4
B6 Great Britain	2
A7 Philippines	1
P2
B5 China	3
A8 South Africa	0
P3
A6 New Zealand	0
B7 Venezuela	4

11th-12th Placement
P5
Chinese Taipei	13
Great Britain	11
P6
China	8
Venezuela	2

9th Place
P7
Chinese Taipei	6
China	4

=== 13th-16th Placement ===
P1: 10 August 10:00 at NASPA Stadium, Narita
Team	1	2	3	4	5	6	R	H	E
Botswana	0	1	0	0	0	0	1	0	4
Chinese Taipei	0	1	1	3	1	2	8	9	1
WP: Chia-Chen Tsai (1-1) LP: Oreabetse Mojeremane (0-5); Home runs: BOT: None; TPE: Szu-Shih Li; Attendance: 20; Boxscore

P3: 10 August 14:00 at NASPA Stadium, Narita
Team	1	2	3	4	5	6	7	R	H	E
Venezuela	1	0	0	0	0	0	3	4	10	0
New Zealand	0	0	0	0	0	0	0	0	3	0
WP: Michelle Floyd (2-2) LP: Taylor Stewart (0-2); Attendance: 44; Boxscore

P2: 10 August 10:00 at Zett. A. Ball Park, Ichihara
Team	1	2	3	4	5	6	7	R	H	E
South Africa	0	0	0	0	0	0	0	0	1	0
China	1	0	0	2	0	0	X	3	6	0
WP: Xinxing Zhao (3-2) LP: Nushka De Beer (0-1) Sv: Yinan Chai (1); Home runs: RSA: None; CHN: None; Attendance: 73; Boxscore

P4: 10 August 14:00 at Zett. A. Ball Park, Ichihara
Team	1	2	3	4	5	6	7	R	H	E
Philippines	0	1	0	0	0	0	0	1	3	1
Great Britain	0	0	0	0	0	2	X	2	5	0
WP: Georgina Corrick (2-2) LP: Riflayca Basa (0-3); Attendance: 81; Boxscore

=== 11th-12th Placement ===
P5: 11 August 10:00 at Akitsu Baseball Field, Narashino
Team	1	2	3	4	5	6	7	R	H	E
Chinese Taipei	2	0	2	1	4	1	3	13	17	1
Great Britain	3	2	0	4	1	1	0	11	17	3
WP: Ya-Ting Tu (1-2) LP: Elizabeth Fleming (0-3); Home runs: TPE: Feng-Chen Lin; GBR: Kristen Mack; Attendance: 114; Boxscore

P6: 11 August 12:30 at Akitsu Baseball Field, Narashino
Team	1	2	3	4	5	6	7	R	H	E
Venezuela	1	0	0	1	0	0	0	2	5	1
China	2	1	3	2	0	0	X	8	11	1
WP: Lan Wang (3-1) LP: Alondr Perez-Marquez; Home runs: VEN: None; CHN: Ying Lu; Attendance: 73; Boxscore

=== 9th place ===
P7: 11 August 16:30 at Akitsu Baseball Field, Narashino
Team	1	2	3	4	5	6	7	R	H	E
Chinese Taipei	3	0	1	0	2	0	0	6	11	1
China	0	0	0	0	4	0	0	4	10	1
WP: An-Ju Chiu (3-0) LP: Xinxing Zhao (3-3) Sv: Su-Hua Lin (2); Attendance: 56; Boxscore

== Playoff round ==
Upper round 1	Upper final	World Championship Final
C3
A1	United States	3
B2	Australia	1	C8
W3	United States	4^{(8)}
C4	W4	Japan	3
B1	Japan	7^{(6)}
A2	Puerto Rico	0
C10
W8	United States	7^{(10)}
W9	Japan	6
Lower round 1	Lower round 2	Lower round 3	Lower final
C5
C1	L3	Australia	2^{(8)}	C9
A3	Mexico	1^{(9)}	W1	Mexico	1	C7	L8	Japan	3
B4	Italy	0	W5	Australia	0	W7	Canada	0
C6	W6	Canada	12^{(4)}
C2	L4	Puerto Rico	4
B3	Canada	8^{(5)}	W2	Canada	10
A4	Netherlands	1

=== Preliminary Page System ===
==== Preliminary Semifinals ====
C1: 10 August 10:00 at Zozo Marine Stadium, Chiba
Team	1	2	3	4	5	6	7	8	9	R	H	E
Italy	0	0	0	0	0	0	0	0	0	0	4	0
Mexico	0	0	0	0	0	0	0	0	1	1	6	1
WP: Dalla Escobedo-Gosch (5-0) LP: Greta Cecchetti (3-4); Home runs: ITA: None; MEX: None; Attendance: 186; Boxscore

C3: 10 August 15:30 at Zozo Marine Stadium, Chiba
Team	1	2	3	4	5	6	7	R	H	E
Australia	0	0	0	1	0	0	0	1	2	2
United States	1	0	0	0	2	0	X	3	4	0
WP: Monica Abbott (4-2) LP: Kaia Parnaby (4-2); Home runs: AUS: Stacey Porter; USA: None; Attendance: 350; Boxscore

C2: 10 August 12:30 at Zozo Marine Stadium, Chiba
Team	1	2	3	4	5	R	H	E
Netherlands	0	1	0	0	0	1	1	1
Canada	1	2	0	3	2	8	6	0
WP: Danielle Lawrie (3-0) LP: Eva Voortman (0-2); Home runs: NED: Soclaina Van Gurp; CAN: Larissa Franklin (2); Attendance: 110; Boxscore

C4: 10 August 19:00 at Zozo Marine Stadium, Chiba
Team	1	2	3	4	5	6	R	H	E
Puerto Rico	0	0	0	0	0	0	0	4	1
Japan	1	5	0	0	0	1	7	5	0
WP: Yukiko Ueno (5-0) LP: Giselle Juarez (1-1); Home runs: PUR: None; JPN: Yu Yamamoto; Attendance: 2005; Boxscore

==== Preliminary Finals ====
C5: 11 August 10:00 at Zozo Marine Stadium, Chiba
Team	1	2	3	4	5	6	7	8	R	H	E
Mexico	0	0	0	0	0	0	0	1	1	5	0
Australia	0	0	0	0	0	0	0	2	2	5	0
WP: Kaia Parnaby (5-2) LP: Dalla Escobedo-Gosch (5-1); Attendance: 193; Boxscore

C6: 11 August 12:00 at Zozo Marine Stadium, Chiba
Team	1	2	3	4	5	6	7	R	H	E
Canada	1	2	1	1	0	0	5	10	10	1
Puerto Rico	0	4	0	0	0	0	0	4	7	2
WP: Danielle Caira (4-0) LP: Taran Alvelo (1-1); Home runs: CAN: Erika Polidori, Holly Speers, Kaleigh Rafter, Jennifer Gilbert; PUR: Aleimalee Lopez; Attendance: 992; Boxscore

=== Championship Page System ===
==== Championship Semifinals ====
C7: 11 August 15:30 at Zozo Marine Stadium, Chiba
Team	1	2	3	4	R	H	E
Canada	5	0	7	0	12	14	0
Australia	0	0	0	0	0	4	0
WP: Danielle Lawrie (5-0) LP: Kaia Parnaby (5-3); Home runs: CAN: Victoria Hayward, Erika Polidori, Jennifer Salling, Larissa Franklin; AUS: None; Attendance: 640; Boxscore

C8: 11 August 19:00 at Zozo Marine Stadium, Chiba
Team	1	2	3	4	5	6	7	8	R	H	E
Japan	2	0	1	0	0	0	0	0	3	9	1
United States	0	0	2	0	1	0	0	1	4	8	0
WP: LP: Yamato Fujita (1-1); Home runs: JPN: Yu Yamamoto; USA: Aubree Munro, Kelsey Stewart; Attendance: 5922; Boxscore

==== Bronze-medal game ====
C9: 12 August 14:00 at Zozo Marine Stadium, Chiba
Team	1	2	3	4	5	6	7	R	H	E
Canada (bronze)	0	0	0	0	0	0	0	0	4	3
Japan	1	0	2	0	0	0	X	3	7	1
WP: Yukiko Ueno (6-0) LP: Danielle Lawrie (5-1); Home runs: CAN: None; JPN: Saki Yamazaki; Attendance: 7165; Boxscore

==== World Championship Final ====
C10: 12 August 19:00 at Zozo Marine Stadium, Chiba
Team	1	2	3	4	5	6	7	8	9	10	R	H	E
Japan (silver)	0	1	1	0	0	1	0	1	0	2	6	12	0
United States (gold)	0	0	3	0	0	0	0	1	0	3	7	10	0
WP: Monica Cecili (5-0) LP: Yukiko Ueno (6-1); Home runs: JPN: Yamato Fujita (2); USA: Delaney Spaulding; Attendance: 11,168; Boxscore

== Final standings ==
Qualified for the 2020 Summer Olympics

Rank	Team
1st place, gold medalist(s)	United States
2nd place, silver medalist(s)	Japan
3rd place, bronze medalist(s)	Canada
4	Australia
5	Puerto Rico
6	Mexico
7	Italy
8	Netherlands
9	Chinese Taipei
10	China
11	Great Britain
12	Venezuela
13	New Zealand
14	Philippines
15	South Africa
16	Botswana
