= Estadio Panamericano de Softbol =

Softball stadium in Guadalajara, Jalisco

- Location: Guadalajara, Jalisco
- Capacity: 792
- Public transit: Unidad Deportiva

Construction
- Opened: May 2010

Tenant
- 2011 Pan American Games

The Pan American Softball Stadium is a softball stadium located in Guadalajara, Jalisco. The stadium was opened in May 2010, and has a capacity of 792 spectators. The stadium was built to host the softball competition at the 2011 Pan American Games. It also hosted the 2010 Mexican National Olympics, and after the Pan American Games it will be used to host youth baseball and softball tournaments. The stadium has received very favourable reviews from both the United States women's national softball team and the president of the International Softball Federation.

== See also ==
- Softball at the 2011 Pan American Games
