= Oregon Ducks softball =

University softball team

Oregon Ducks Softball
- Founded: 1974; 52 years ago
- University: University of Oregon
- Head coach: Melyssa Lombardi (7th season)
- Conference: Big Ten
- Location: Eugene, Oregon, US
- Home stadium: Jane Sanders Stadium (capacity: 1,500)
- Nickname: Ducks
- Colors: Green and yellow

NCAA WCWS appearances
- 1989, 2012, 2014, 2015, 2017, 2018, 2025

AIAW WCWS appearances
- 1976, 1980

NCAA super regional appearances
- 2010, 2011, 2012, 2013, 2014, 2015, 2016, 2017, 2018, 2023, 2025

NCAA Tournament appearances
- 1989, 1994, 1998, 1999, 2000, 2003, 2004, 2005, 2007, 2008, 2010, 2011, 2012, 2013, 2014, 2015, 2016, 2017, 2018, 2021, 2022, 2023, 2024, 2025, 2026

Regular-season conference championships
- 2013, 2014, 2015, 2016, 2018, 2025

The Oregon Ducks softball team represents the University of Oregon in NCAA Division I college softball. The Ducks compete in the Big Ten Conference and are led by head coach Melyssa Lombardi. Oregon plays their home games at Jane Sanders Stadium after playing at Howe Field through 2015. Oregon has appeared in nine Women's College World Series.

== History ==
=== Coaching history ===
Years	Coach	Record	%
1974–1979	Becky Sisley	57–59	.491
1980	Nancy Platz	18–12	.600
1981	John Feeney	8–19	.296
1982	Charles Sylvester	8–13	.381
1983–1985	P.J. Harlin	42–79	.347
1986–1989	Teresa Wilson	126–104	.548
1990–1996	Tami Brown	192–154	.555
1997–2001	Rick Gamez	168–164–1	.506
2002	Brent Rincon	24–30	.444
2002–2009	Kathy Arendsen	234–176	.571
2010–2018	Mike White	435–111–1	.796
2019–present	Melyssa Lombardi	239–116	.673

== Championships ==
=== Conference Championships ===
Season	Conference	Record	Head coach
2013	Pac–12 Conference	19–5	Mike White
2014	Pac–12 Conference	20–3–1	Mike White
2015	Pac–12 Conference	21–3	Mike White
2016	Pac–12 Conference	20–4	Mike White
2018	Pac–12 Conference	21–3	Mike White
2025	Big Ten Conference	19–3	Melyssa Lombardi

== Coaching staff ==
Name	Position coached	Consecutive season at Oregon in current position
Melyssa Lombardi	Head coach	8th
Sam Marder	Associate head coach	5th
Sydney Romero	Assistant coach	3rd
Alyssa Palomino—Cardoza	Assistant coach and volunteer coach	3rd

== Year-by-year results ==
Legend
National champions
Women's College World Series berth
Conference Tournament Champions
Conference Regular Season Champions

Season	Head coach	Overall				Conference				Conference; Standing	Conference; Tournament	NCAA Tournament	Final; Rank
Season	Head coach	W	L	T	%	W	L	T	%	Conference; Standing	Conference; Tournament	NCAA Tournament	Final; Rank
1974	Becky Sisley	3	8	0	.273	0	0	0	–	N/A			
1975	Becky Sisley	5	7	0	.417	0	0	0	–	N/A			
1976	Becky Sisley	16	6	0	.727	0	0	0	–	N/A		AIAW World Series 2nd Round	
1977	Becky Sisley	12	9	0	.571	0	0	0	–	N/A			
1978	Becky Sisley	4	13	0	.235	0	0	0	–	N/A			
1979	Becky Sisley	17	16	0	.515	0	0	0	–	N/A			
1980	Nancy Platz	18	12	0	.600	0	0	0	–	N/A		AIAW World Series 3rd Round	
1981	John Feeney	8	19	0	.296	0	0	0	–	N/A			
1982	Charles Sylvester	8	13	0	.381	0	0	0	–	N/A			
1983	P.J. Harlin	6	21	0	.222	0	0	0	–	N/A			
1984	P.J. Harlin	17	33	0	.340	0	0	0	–	N/A			
1985	P.J. Harlin	19	25	0	.432	0	0	0	–	N/A			
1986	Teresa Wilson	17	30	0	.362	0	0	0	–	N/A			
1987	Teresa Wilson	23	30	0	.434	2	8	0	.200	5th			
1988	Teresa Wilson	32	26	0	.552	9	11	0	.450	3rd			
1989	Teresa Wilson	54	18	0	.750	13	7	0	.650	2nd		Women's College World Series 3rd Round	
1990	Tami Brown	35	23	0	.603	9	9	0	.500	T-3rd		Regional #8 Semifinal	
1991	Tami Brown	29	29	0	.500	4	16	0	.200	5th			
1992	Tami Brown	26	28	0	.481	5	13	0	.278	5th			
1993	Tami Brown	18	16	0	.529	8	8	0	.500	5th			
1994	Tami Brown	38	22	0	.633	12	12	0	.500	4th		Regional #6 Finals	
1995	Tami Brown	25	26	0	.490	12	15	0	.444	5th			
1996	Tami Brown	21	30	0	.412	5	18	0	.217	7th			
1997	Rick Gamez	24	35	1	.408	9	19	0	.321	T-6th			
1998	Rick Gamez	40	31	0	.563	10	18	0	.357	5th		Regional #2 Finals	20
1999	Rick Gamez	40	29	0	.580	10	18	0	.357	T-6th		Regional #8 Semifinals	25
2000	Rick Gamez	36	29	0	.554	6	15	0	.286	T-7th		Regional #7 Semifinals	16
2001	Rick Gamez	28	40	0	.412	1	20	0	.048	8th			
2002	Brent Rincon	24	30	0	.444	2	19	0	.095	8th			
2003	Kathy Arendsen	37	19	0	.661	10	11	0	.476	T-3rd		Regional #7 Finals	16
2004	Kathy Arendsen	42	21	0	.667	10	11	0	.476	6th		Regional #4 Finals	12
2005	Kathy Arendsen	36	25	0	.590	7	14	0	.333	7th		Norman Regional Finals	23
2006	Kathy Arendsen	24	29	0	.453	5	16	0	.238	8th			
2007	Kathy Arendsen	44	19	0	.698	7	14	0	.333	7th		Columbia Regional Finals	22
2008	Kathy Arendsen	35	29	0	.547	5	16	0	.238	8th		Norman Regional Finals	
2009	Kathy Arendsen	16	34	0	.320	3	18	0	.143	8th			
2010	Mike White	36	21	0	.632	8	13	0	.381	T-6th		Columbia Super Regional	14
2011	Mike White	42	16	0	.724	11	10	0	.524	T-3rd		Gainesville Super Regional	15
2012	Mike White	45	18	0	.714	12	9	0	.571	3rd		Women's College World Series 2nd Round	5
2013	Mike White	50	11	0	.820	19	5	0	.792	1st		Eugene Super Regional	9
2014	Mike White	56	9	1	.856	20	3	1	.854	1st		Women's College World Series Semifinals	3
2015	Mike White	51	8	0	.864	21	3	0	.875	1st		Women's College World Series 1st Round	7
2016	Mike White	48	10	0	.828	20	4	0	.833	1st		Eugene Super Regional	10
2017	Mike White	54	8	0	.871	17	6	0	.739	2nd		Women's College World Series Semifinals	4
2018	Mike White	53	10	0	.841	21	3	0	.875	1st		Women's College World Series 2nd Round	6
2019	Melyssa Lombardi	22	30	0	.423	5	19	0	.208	9th			
2020	Melyssa Lombardi	22	2	0	.917	0	0	0	–	N/A		Cancelled due to COVID-19	9
2021	Melyssa Lombardi	40	17	0	.702	14	10	0	.583	3rd		Austin Regional Finals	17
2022	Melyssa Lombardi	33	19	0	.635	10	14	0	.417	5th		Fayetteville Regional Finals	24
2023	Melyssa Lombardi	38	17	0	.691	14	10	0	.583	5th		Stillwater Super Regional	19
2024	Melyssa Lombardi	30	21	0	.588	13	10	0	.565	T-3rd		Norman Regional Finals	22
2025	Melyssa Lombardi	54	10	0	.844	19	3	0	.864	1st		Women's College World Series 2nd Round	5
2026	Melyssa Lombardi	41	14	0	.844	20	4	0	.833	T-2nd		NCAA Regional	20
Total		1,582	1,049	2	.601	408	454	1	.473	6	0	0	

=== NCAA Tournament seeding history ===
National seeding began in 2005. The Oregon Ducks have been a national seed eight times.

Years →	'12	'13	'14	'15	'16	'17	'18	'25	'26
Seeds →	11	3	1	2	5	3	1	16	14

== Women's College World Series Results ==
Year	Seed	Opponent	Round	Result
1976	N/A	Minnesota; Mayville State; Indiana State	First Round; First Round; First Round	L 1–5; W 11–0; L 6–14
1980	N/A	Massachusetts; Utah State; Southwest Missouri State; Western Michigan	First Round; Second Round; Second Round; Third Round	W 7–3; L 0–5; W 2–1; L 0–1
1989	N/A	Cal Poly Pomona; South Carolina; Arizona	First Round; Second Round; Third Round	L 0–1; W 1–0; L 0–4
2012	11	(3) Arizona State (7) Tennessee (1) California	First Round; First Round; Second Round	L 1–3; W 3–1; L 3–6
2014	1	(8) Florida State (5) Florida (7) Oklahoma (2) Alabama	First Round; Second Round; Second Round; National Semi-Finals	W 3–0; L 0–4; W 4–2; L 0–2
2015	2	(7) UCLA (6) Alabama	First Round; First Round	L 1–7; L 1–2
2017	3	(6) Washington (15) Baylor (13) LSU (10) Oklahoma	First Round; First Round; Second Round; National Semi-Finals	L 1–3; W 7–4; W 4–1; L 2–4
2018	1	(8) Arizona State (5) Washington (6) Florida State	First Round; Second Round; Second Round	W 11–6; L 2–6; 1–4
2025	16	(9) UCLA; Ole Miss (2) Oklahoma	First Round; First Round; Second Round	L 2–4; W 6–5^{(10)} L 1–4

== Awards and honors ==
=== Conference awards ===
Pac-12 Player of the Year

- Katie Wiese (1989)

Pac-12 Pitcher of the Year

- Jessica Moore (2013)
- Cheridan Hawkins (2014, 2015, 2016)
- Megan Kleist (2018)

Pac-12 Freshman of the Year

- Jennifer Salling (2007)
- Samantha Pappas (2010)
- Jenna Lilley (2015)
- Megan Kleist (2016)

Pac-12 Defensive Player of the Year

- Janelle Lindvall (2016)
- Paige Sinicki (2024)

Pac-12 Coach of the Year

- Teresa Wilson (1989)
- Mike White (2013, 2014, 2016)

Big Ten Coach of the Year

- Melyssa Lombardi (2025)

=== National awards ===
NFCA Catcher of the Year

- Gwen Svekis (2018)
- Terra McGowan (2023)

NFCA Golden Shoe Award

- Kai Luschar (2025)

== See also ==
- List of NCAA Division I softball programs
