= 1976 Women's College World Series =

The 1976 Women's College World Series (WCWS) was held in Omaha, Nebraska on May 13–16, with nineteen college softball teams meeting in the 1976 ASA/AIAW fastpitch softball tournament. Most of the teams had won state championships. This was the last WCWS before the adoption of regional qualifying tournaments. Because college softball had not yet been separated into competitive divisions, large and small colleges competed together in one overall national championship.

The Michigan State Spartans went undefeated through all five of their games to win the 1976 national championship, beating Northern Colorado, 3–0, in the final game. Carol Hutchins played shortstop for that 1976 team and would coach the rival Michigan Wolverines to the WCWS title 29 years later in 2005.

== Teams ==
The double-elimination tournament included the following teams:

Team	Appearance
Arizona State	4th
Cal State–Sacramento	1st
East Stroudsburg State (PA)	2nd
Illinois State	6th
Indiana State	2nd
Kansas	4th
Mayville State (ND)	1st
Michigan State	4th
Minnesota	1st
Nebraska–Omaha	7th
Northern Colorado	8th
Northern Iowa	3rd
Northern State (SD)	2nd
Northwestern Oklahoma State	1st
Oregon	1st
South Carolina	4th
Tarkio College (MO)	1st
Texas–Arlington	1st
Utah	1st

== Bracket ==
The bracket included 19 teams with results as shown.

Upper round 1	Upper round 2	Upper round 3	Upper round 4	Upper final	Final
Minnesota	1
Minnesota	5	Michigan State	2
Michigan State	6 (Note: The Michigan State Softball Record Book lists the scores of these wins over Kansas and Arizona State as 6-4 and 4-0, respectively.)
Oregon	1
Kansas	5
Cal State–Sacramento	L
Cal State–Sacramento	5	Kansas	W
Michigan State	2
Utah	1
Arizona State	0
East Stroudsburg	4
East Stroudsburg	10	Arizona State	14
Arizona State	2
South Carolina	0
Northern Iowa	0
Northern Iowa	3
Northern State	1
Michigan State	1
Nebraska–Omaha	0
Nebraska–Omaha	10
Mayville State College	0
Nebraska–Omaha	3
Tarkio College	1
Tarkio College	3
Indiana State	0
Nebraska–Omaha	3
Northern Colorado	2
Illinois State	7
Northwestern Oklahoma State	0
Illinois State	1
Michigan State	3	–
Northern Colorado	5 (Note: No-hitter. The Northern Colorado Softball Record Book lists this score as 5-0.)
Northern Colorado	1^{(12)}	Northern Colorado	0	–
Texas–Arlington	0
Lower round 1	Lower round 2	Lower round 3	Lower round 4	Lower round 5	Lower round 6	Lower final
East Stroudsburg	0
Tarkio College	4
East Stroudsburg	4	Tarkio College	3
Tarkio College	5	Arizona State	5
Northern State	1	Utah	1
Illinois State	0	Northern Colorado	3
Utah	5	Cal State–Sacramento	3
Arizona State	3	Nebraska–Omaha	2
Cal State–Sacramento	6	Illinois State	6
Northern Colorado	13
Mayville State College	0	Minnesota	1
Oregon	11	Indiana State	2
Northern Iowa	0
Indiana State	14	Northern Iowa	10
Northern Iowa	6	Northern Colorado	1
Oregon	6
Texas–Arlington	0
Texas–Arlington	2
Texas–Arlington	3	Kansas	0
Northwestern Oklahoma State	1	South Carolina	0
South Carolina	5

== Ranking ==
Place	School	WCWS Record
1st	Michigan State	5-0
2nd	Northern Colorado	5-2
3rd	Nebraska–Omaha	3-2
4th	Arizona State	3-2
5th	Tarkio College	3-2
5th	Northern Iowa	3-2
7th	Illinois State	2-2
7th	Texas–Arlington	2-2
9th	East Stroudsburg State College	2-2
9th	Cal State–Sacramento	2-2
9th	Kansas	1-2
9th	Indiana State	1-2
13th	Utah	1-2
13th	Oregon	1-2
13th	South Carolina	1-2
13th	Minnesota	1-2
17th	Northwestern Oklahoma State	0-2
17th	Northern State College	0-2
17th	Mayville State College	0-2
