= Softball at the 2009 World Games =

The softball competition at the World Games 2009 took place from 17 to 20 July at the Lide Baseball Stadium. It was a demonstration sport.

== Calendar ==
| Julho | 16 | 17 | 18 | 19 | 20 | 21 | 22 | 23 | 24 | 25 | 26 | Finais |
|---|---|---|---|---|---|---|---|---|---|---|---|---|
| Softball | | | | | 1 | | | | | | | 1 |

== Medal winners ==
| Japan | Chinese Taipei | South Korea |
| Yuko Chonan; Satomi Hamauzu; Megumi Inoue; Nana Ishida; Mai Kasuhari; Sayaka Mori; Ryo Morita; Yuri Nishikawa; Rie Nishioka; Erika Ohmura; Kaori Okada; Kaoru Oyanagi; Erika Shigefuji; Nana Tanabe; Shiho Taniike | Chang Li-Chiu; Chang Man-Hsoan; Chiang Hui-Chuan; Chiu An-Ju; Chueh Ming-Hui; Chung Hui-Lin; Kao Ching-Yi; Lai Meng-Ting; Lee Hsiao-Chi; Li Chiu-Ching; Li Szu-Shih; Lin Pei-Chun; Lo Yin-Sha; Wu Hsin-Ying; Yang Yi-Ting | Choi Mi Jin; Hong Kija; Jeong Yoonyoung; Jung Young Mi; Kang Hee Young; Kim Jin A Kim Miniyoung; Lee Bok Hee; Lee Eunmi; Lim Mii Ran; Noh Keumran; Pak Sun Yeo; Park Suyoun; Suk Eunjung; Yoon Hye Young |

== Results ==
=== First phase ===
| 1 | Japan |
| 2 | Chinese Taipei |
| 3 | South Korea |
| 4 | Russia |
| 5 | Canada |
| 6 | Singapore |

Indicated is Taiwan time (UTC+8).

| Time | Game | | |
|---|---|---|---|
1st round - July 17
| 09:00 | Chinese Taipei | 11-0 | Canada |
| 11:15 | Russia | 3-2 | South Korea |
| 13:30 | Japan | 0-0 | Singapore |
2nd round - July 17
| 15:45 | South Korea | 7-0 | Canada |
| 18:00 | Russia | 11-4 | Singapore |
| 20:15 | Japan | 0-6 | Chinese Taipei |
3rd round - July 18
| 09:00 | Singapore | 0-13 | South Korea |
| 11:15 | Canada | 1-13 | Japan |
| 13:30 | Russia | 0-3 | Chinese Taipei |

| Time | Game | | |
|---|---|---|---|
4th round - July 18
| 15:45 | South Korea | 0-2 | Japan |
| 18:00 | Russia | 4-5 | Canada |
| 20:15 | Singapore | 0-18 | Canada |
5th round - July 19
| 09:00 | Russia | 2-6 | Japan |
| 11:15 | Chinese Taipei | 8-1 | South Korea |
| 13:30 | Canada | 6-3 | Singapore |

=== Second phase ===
==== Semifinals ====
| Time | Game | | | |
|---|---|---|---|---|
July 19
| 17:00 | Game 1 | South Korea | 2-1 | Russia |
| 19:30 | Game 2 | Japan | 2-1 | Chinese Taipei |

==== Finals ====
| Time | Game | | | |
|---|---|---|---|---|
July 20
| 13:00 | Game for final | South Korea | 0-7 | Chinese Taipei |
| 15:00 | Final | Japan | 4-2 | Chinese Taipei |

=== Final classification ===
| Rank | Team |
|---|---|
| Gold medal | Japan |
| Silver medal | Chinese Taipei |
| Bronze medal | South Korea |
| 4 | Russia |
| 5 | Canada |
| 6 | Singapore |
