= Softball at the 1981 World Games =

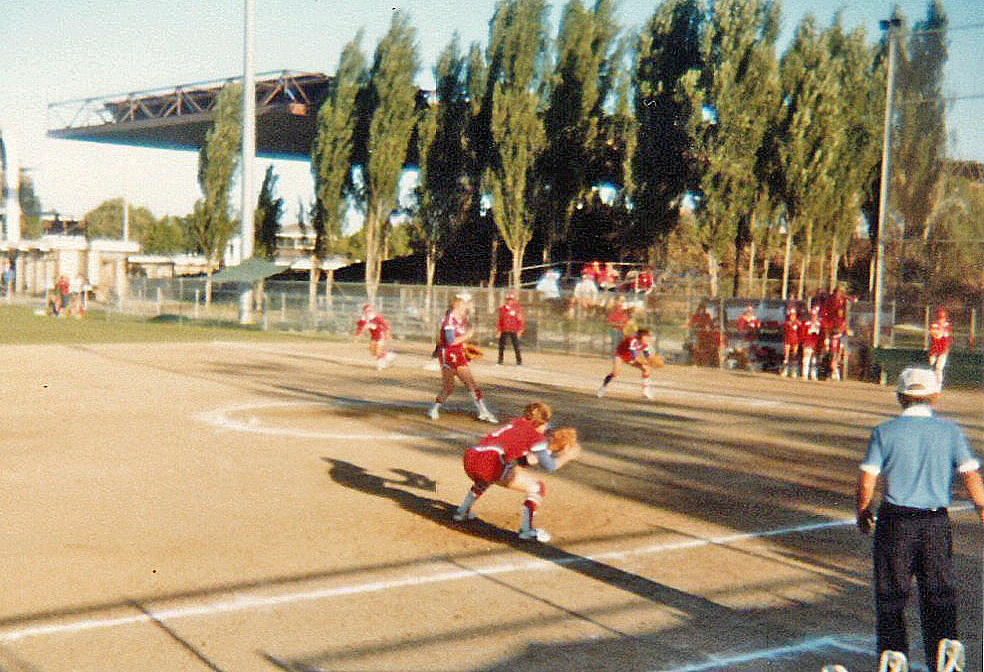
Women's softball at World Games I

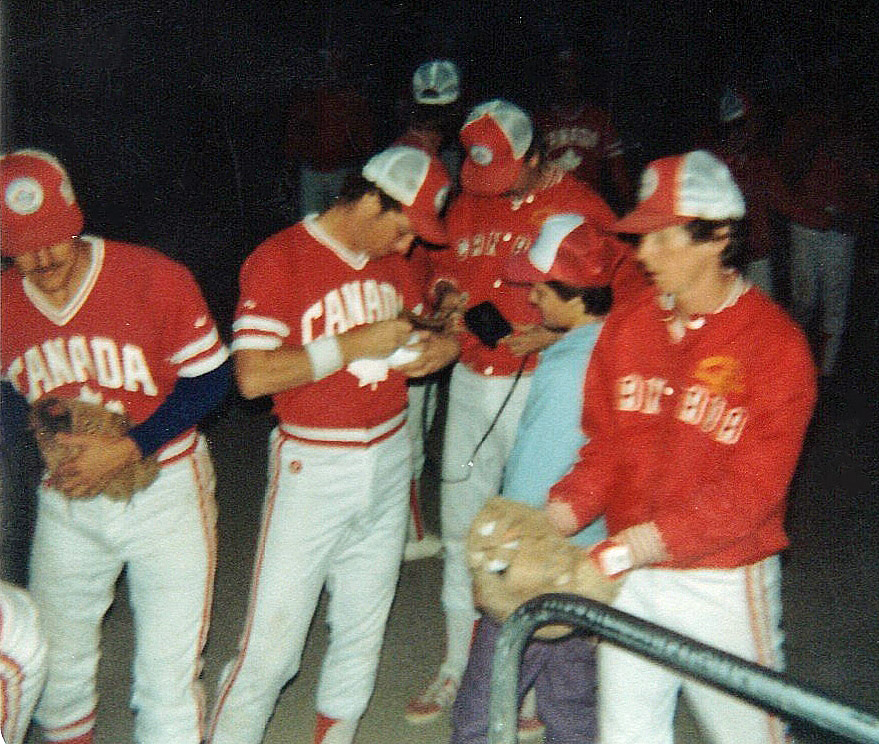
Canada's men's softball team at the 1981 World Games

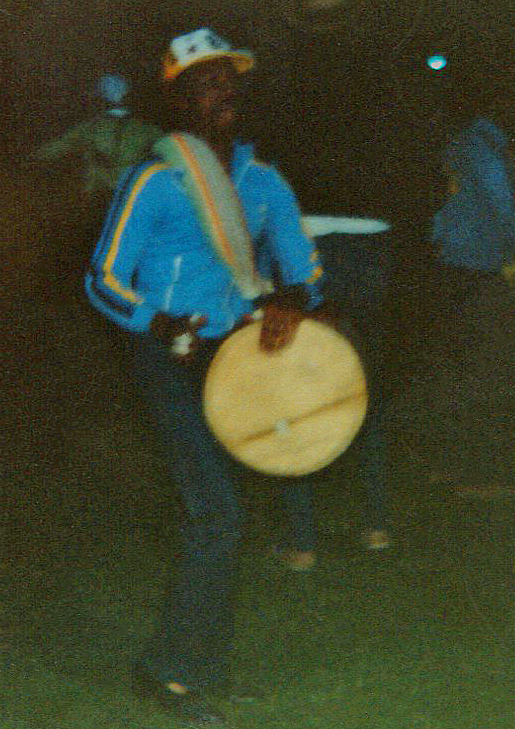
World Games I Women's Softball, Bahamas post-game celebration, August 1981. After the bronze-medal clinching women's softball game, Bahamian fans staged an impromptu celebration that wound its way around the perimeter of the field, with continual singing, dancing, music and Caribbean beats.

Both men's and women's softball tournaments were conducted during World Games I. The games were played July 30 - August 2, 1981 at Central Park in Santa Clara, California. Teams from the United States, Canada, the Bahamas and Chinese Taipei participated in the women's event, while in the men's event, the United States, Canada, the Bahamas and Mexico were initially slated to appear. As the time of the Games approached, the Mexican team withdrew for financial reasons and was replaced by a second team from the United States.

All three U.S. teams were intact successful high-level softball teams, well known in the U.S. softball community. The Raybestos Brakettes club from Connecticut was the women's team. The majority of Canada's women’s team came from the Saskatoon Harmony Centres. For the men, United States I, the original selection for the Games, was the Peterbilt team from Seattle, Washington. After Mexico's decision, the Guanella Brothers team from Santa Rosa, California was engaged in the role of United States II. Nova Scotia's Brookfield Elks comprised most of Canada's men’s team.

Kathy Arendsen pitched four shutouts for the U.S. women, culminating in a perfect game in the championship final.

== Women ==
=== Medalists ===
Gold	Silver	Bronze
United States Kathy Arendsen; Beth Conrad; Sandy Cloutier; Doreen Denmon; Pat Dufficy; Sue Enquist; Sue Eskierski; Patti Fernandes; Missy Mapes; Barbara Reinalda; Allyson Rioux; Diane Schumacher; Kathy Strachan; Gina Vecchione; Ginny Walsh....	Canada Nancy Brentnell; Diane Bronsard; Kim Cudmore; Shawna Hicks; Joan Hildebrand; LuAnne Izzard; Ellie Kachur; Jay Kost; Diane Lynn; Shan McDonald; Noreen Murphy; Patti Polych; Pattie Rowley; Darlene Solie; Dawn Storey-Gray; Anne Tkachuck; Pat Wegner..	Bahamas Sherlyn Bain; Earnestine Butler Stubbs; Candice DeGregory Culmer; Naomi Ellis; Carolyn Ferguson; Debbie Forbes; Linda Ford; Auria Wood Knowles; Barbara Knowles; Kay Moxey; Cyprianna McKinney; Cynthia "Mother" Pratt; Jan Poitier; Denise Reckley; Nancy Russell; Audrey Sears; Cheryl Turnquest; Daisy Walker; Alice or Sandra Wells

=== Standing ===
Round-robin phase:

Team	W	L	RS	RA
United States	6	0	19	0
Canada	3	3	8	11
Bahamas	2	4	14	22
Chinese Taipei	1	5	7	15

=== Details ===
Each team played two games per day for three days, followed by a championship game between the top two teams in the standing.

Thursday, July 30, 1981:

Canada 4, Bahamas 3
United States 1, Chinese Taipei 0
United States 4, Bahamas 0
Chinese Taipei 2, Canada 0

July 30 Central Park, Santa Clara
Team	1	2	3	4	5	6	7	R	H
Chinese Taipei	0	0	0	0	0	0	0	0	1
(United States) USA	0	0	0	0	0	0	1	1	8
WP: Kathy Arendsen (1-0) LP: Yen Shoiu-Ing (0-1)

July 30 Central Park, Santa Clara
Team	1	2	3	4	5	6	7	R	H
(The Bahamas) Bahamas	0	0	0	0	0	0	0	0	1
(United States) USA	0	3	0	0	1	0	X	4	4
WP: Barbara Reinalda (1-0) LP: Earnestine Butler (0-1); Home runs: BAH: None; USA: Denmon

Friday, July 31, 1981:

Bahamas 5, Chinese Taipei 2
United States 3, Canada 0
Canada 2, Bahamas 1
United States 2, Chinese Taipei 0

July 31 12:00 Central Park, Santa Clara
Team	1	2	3	4	5	6	7	R	H	E
Chinese Taipei	0	0	0	0	1	0	1	2	4	1
(The Bahamas) Bahamas	2	0	0	2	0	1	X	5	10	1
WP: Wells (1-0) LP: Yen Shoiu-Ing (0-2)

July 31 14:00 Central Park, Santa Clara
Team	1	2	3	4	5	6	7	R	H	E
Canada	0	0	0	0	0	0	0	0	2	1
(United States) USA	1	0	0	0	2	0	X	3	6	0
WP: Kathy Arendsen (2-0) LP: Patti Polych (1-1)

July 31 18:00 Central Park, Santa Clara
Team	1	2	3	4	5	6	7	R	H	E
Canada	0	1	0	1	0	0	0	2	5	1
(The Bahamas) Bahamas	1	0	0	0	0	0	0	1	4	4
WP: LuAnne Izzard (1-0) LP: Auria Wood Knowles (0-1)

July 31 20:00 Central Park, Santa Clara
Team	1	2	3	4	5	6	7	R	H	E
Chinese Taipei	0	0	0	0	0	0	0	0	2	0
(United States) USA	0	1	0	0	0	1	X	2	5	0
WP: Barbara Reinalda (2-0) LP: Chien Chin-Ling (0-1)

Saturday, August 1, 1981:

Canada 2, Chinese Taipei 1
United States 8, Bahamas 0
United States 1, Canada 0 (9 inn.)
Bahamas 5, Chinese Taipei 2

August 1 Central Park, Santa Clara
Team	1	2	3	4	5	6	7	R	H
(United States) USA	0	1	1	3	3	0	0	8	14
(The Bahamas) Bahamas	0	0	0	0	0	0	0	0	2
WP: Kathy Arendsen (3-0) LP: Cyprianna McKinney

August 1 Central Park, Santa Clara
Team	1	2	3	4	5	6	7	8	9	R	H
(United States) USA	0	0	0	0	0	0	0	0	1	1	6
Canada	0	0	0	0	0	0	0	0	0	0	7
WP: Barbara Reinalda (3-0) LP: Shan McDonald

Sunday, August 2, 1981:

Championship game -- United States 3, Canada 0 (perfect game by Arendsen)

August 2 14:00 Central Park, Santa Clara
Team	1	2	3	4	5	6	7	R	H	E
(United States) USA	0	2	0	0	0	1	0	3	6	0
Canada	0	0	0	0	0	0	0	0	0	0
WP: Kathy Arendsen (4-0), perfect game LP: Patti Polych (2-2)

Other known individual participants: TPE – Feng-Yuan, Lih-Ju, Suh-Shain, Lee-Mai, Feng-Jiau, Yum-Gem, Shiou-Pin, Suh-Shiumg, Kum-Yimg, Mei-Hwa

== Men ==
=== Medalists ===
Gold	Silver	Bronze
United States II Ray Allena; Rich Balswick; Peter Brown; Les Crandall; Chuck D'Arcy; Bob Dallas; K. G. Fincher; Jim Marsh; Zeke McDowell; Mike Nevin; John Olander; Mike Parnow; Terry Ray; Dallas Rountree; John Topolewski; Frank Topolewski...	United States I Butch Batt; Mike Bishop; Jeff Borror; Dick Brubaker; Mark Lee; Dennis Mackinin; Bob Miller; George Nokes; Larry Seabaugh; Jim Moore; Bill Stewart; Tim Sullivan; Greg Vangaver others.....	Canada Ron Boland; Serge Bourque; Jerome Brocklehurst; Bobby Campbell; Robbie Cooke; Pierre Gosselin; John Green; Ron Gustafson; Robbie Guenter; Steve Healy; Mike Henderson; Doug Holland; Dave Hunt; Marty Kernaghan; Gene McWillie; Steve Locke; Dennis Peterson; Robert Putnam; Mike Worseley

=== Standing ===
Round-robin phase:

Team	W	L	RS	RA
United States I	5	1	23	9
United States II	4	2	13	10
Canada	3	3	14 (min)	12 (min)
Bahamas	0	6	5 (min)	24 (min)

=== Details ===
Each team played two games per day for three days, followed by a championship game between the top two teams in the standing.

Thursday, July 30, 1981:

United States II 3, Bahamas 0
United States I 2, Canada 1
United States I 8, Bahamas 0
Canada 4, United States II 1 (9 inn.)

Friday, July 31, 1981:

Canada 4, Bahamas 3 (9 inn.)
United States I 3, United States II 1
United States II 3, Bahamas 1
United States I 4, Canada 3 (10 inn.)

July 31 12:00 Central Park, Santa Clara
Team	1	2	3	4	5	6	7	8	9	R	H	E
(The Bahamas) Bahamas	0	0	3	0	0	0	0	0	0	3	9	1
Canada	0	0	0	1	0	1	1	0	1	4	9	1
WP: Robbie Guenter (2-0) LP: Rich Johnson (0-2)

July 31 14:00 Central Park, Santa Clara
Team	1	2	3	4	5	6	7	R	H	E
(United States) USA I	0	0	2	0	0	1	0	3	8	1
(United States) USA II	1	0	0	0	0	0	0	1	3	0
WP: Mark Lee (2-0) LP: Peter Brown (0-1)

July 31 18:00 Central Park, Santa Clara
Team	1	2	3	4	5	6	7	R	H	E
(United States) USA II	0	0	2	0	0	1	0	3	5	2
(The Bahamas) Bahamas	0	1	0	0	0	0	0	1	4	1
WP: Chuck D'Arcy (2-0) LP: Max Sweeting (0-1); Home runs: USA II: Ray Allena; BAH: None

July 31 20:00 Central Park, Santa Clara
Team	1	2	3	4	5	6	7	8	9	10	R	H	E
Canada	0	1	0	0	0	0	2	0	0	0	3	7	3
(United States) USA I	0	0	0	1	0	2	0	0	0	1	4	8	2
WP: Dick Brubaker LP: Ron Boland

Saturday, August 1, 1981:

United States I 5, Bahamas 1
United States II 2, Canada 1
United States II 3, United States I 1
Canada d. Bahamas

Sunday, August 2, 1981:

Championship game -- United States II 3, United States I 0

August 2 16:00 Central Park, Santa Clara
Team	1	2	3	4	5	6	7	R	H	E
(United States) USA I	0	0	0	0	0	0	0	0	4	0
(United States) USA II	0	0	1	0	0	2	X	3	6	1
WP: Peter Brown (2-1) LP: Jim Moore (1-1)

Other known individual participants: BAH – Bethel, Keith Butler, Dencil Clarke, Ford, Sonny Haven, Adiou Moss, John Rolle, Colin Russell, Douglas Smith, Fred Smith
