= 2014 Women's Softball World Championship =

Tournament details
- Host country: Netherlands
- Dates: 15 August - 24 August
- Teams: 16
- Defending champions: Japan (2012)

Final positions
- Champions: Japan (3rd title)
- Runner-up: United States
- Third place: Australia
- Fourth place: Canada

Tournament statistics
- Games played: 66

The 2014 Women's Softball World Championship was an international softball competition that was held in Haarlem, Netherlands from August 15 to August 24, 2014. It was the 14th edition of the tournament, the first edition ever held in Europe, and also the first edition to be sanctioned by the World Baseball Softball Confederation (WBSC). Previous editions were sanctioned by the International Softball Federation, which governed the sport until its 2013 merger with the International Baseball Federation to create the WBSC.

== Qualification ==
Means of qualification	Berths	Qualified
Host nation	1	Netherlands
Oceania	2	Australia; New Zealand
European Championships	3	Russia; Italy; Czech Republic
Pan-American Championships	5	United States; Canada; Cuba; Puerto Rico; Dominican Republic
Asian qualifier tournament	3	Japan; China; Chinese Taipei
Wildcard	2	Botswana; Great Britain

== Group stage ==
=== Section A ===
Teams	W	L	Pct.	GB
Japan	7	0	1.000	-
Canada	6	1	.857	1
China	4	3	.571	3
New Zealand	3	4	.429	4
Czech Republic	3	4	.429	4
Cuba	3	4	.429	4
Russia	2	5	.333	5
Puerto Rico	0	7	.000	7

Date	Winner	Score	Loser
15 August 2014
15 August 2014	Japan	4-0	China
15 August 2014	Canada	3-2	Puerto Rico
15 August 2014	Czech Republic	6-3	Cuba
15 August 2014	New Zealand	5-1	Russia
16 August 2014
16 August 2014	China	1-0	Puerto Rico
16 August 2014	Japan	5-0	Russia
16 August 2014	Cuba	1-0	New Zealand
16 August 2014	Canada	8-1	Czech Republic
17 August 2014
17 August 2014	Cuba	5-3	Russia
17 August 2014	Japan	9-2 (6)	Puerto Rico
17 August 2014	Czech Republic	3-0	China
17 August 2014	Canada	8-1 (5)	New Zealand
18 August 2014
18 August 2014	Russia	3-0	Czech Republic
18 August 2014	Japan	9-0 (5)	New Zealand
18 August 2014	Canada	2-0	China
18 August 2014	Cuba	3-1	Puerto Rico
19 August 2014
19 August 2014	New Zealand	7-3	Czech Republic
19 August 2014	China	2-0	Cuba
19 August 2014	Russia	2-1	Puerto Rico
19 August 2014	Japan	4-0	Canada
20 August 2014
20 August 2014	China	7-0	New Zealand
20 August 2014	Czech Republic	3-1	Puerto Rico
20 August 2014	Canada	11-0 (5)	Russia
20 August 2014	Japan	7-0	Cuba
21 August 2014
21 August 2014	Canada	7-0	Cuba
21 August 2014	China	8-1 (6)	Russia
21 August 2014	Japan	7-0 (6)	Czech Republic
21 August 2014	New Zealand	3-1	Puerto Rico

=== Section B ===
Teams	W	L	Pct.	GB
United States	7	0	1.000	–
Australia	6	1	.857	1
Chinese Taipei	4	3	.571	3
Netherlands	4	3	.571	3
Italy	3	4	.429	4
Dominican Republic	3	4	.429	4
Botswana	1	6	.143	6
Great Britain	0	7	.000	7

Date	Winner	Score	Loser
15 August 2014
15 August 2014	Australia	2-1	Chinese Taipei
15 August 2014	Italy	3-2	Dominican Republic
15 August 2014	Botswana	5-3	Great Britain
15 August 2014	United States	10-0 (4)	Netherlands
16 August 2014
16 August 2014	United States	7-0 (5)	Botswana
16 August 2014	Chinese Taipei	5-4 (11)	Netherlands
16 August 2014	Dominican Republic	14-6 (5)	Great Britain
16 August 2014	Australia	10-0 (4)	Italy
17 August 2014
17 August 2014	Dominican Republic	11-1 (4)	Botswana
17 August 2014	Australia	9-0 (5)	Great Britain
17 August 2014	Netherlands	8-1 (5)	Italy
17 August 2014	United States	5-1	Chinese Taipei
18 August 2014
18 August 2014	Italy	6-0	Botswana
18 August 2014	United States	11-0 (4)	Great Britain
18 August 2014	Dominican Republic	7-0 (6)	Chinese Taipei
18 August 2014	Australia	4-0	Netherlands
19 August 2014
19 August 2014	Italy	9-0	Great Britain
19 August 2014	Chinese Taipei	9-0 (5)	Botswana
19 August 2014	United States	4-2	Australia
19 August 2014	Netherlands	14-1	Dominican Republic
20 August 2014
20 August 2014	Chinese Taipei	1-0 (8)	Italy
20 August 2014	Australia	17-0 (4)	Botswana
20 August 2014	United States	10-0 (4)	Dominican Republic
20 August 2014	Netherlands	9-3	Great Britain
21 August 2014
21 August 2014	Australia	7-0 (6)	Dominican Republic
21 August 2014	United States	7-0 (5)	Italy
21 August 2014	Chinese Taipei	7-0 (5)	Great Britain
21 August 2014	Netherlands	12-0 (4)	Botswana

== Playoffs ==
=== Day 1 ===
August 22, 2014	China	5-7 (10)	Netherlands	Haarlem 1

August 22, 2014	Chinese Taipei	3-0	New Zealand	Haarlem 2

August 22, 2014	Japan	4-0	Australia	Haarlem 2

August 22, 2014	United States	6-1	Canada	Haarlem 1

=== Day 2 ===
August 23, 2014	Netherlands	0-8 (5)	Australia	Haarlem 1

August 23, 2014	Chinese Taipei	1-2	Canada	Haarlem 2

=== Medal Round ===
Semifinals
W3	Japan	6
W4	United States	1
W5	Australia	7
W6	Canada	3

Bronze Medal
L7	United States	8
W8	Australia	1

Gold Medal
W7	Japan	4
W9	United States	1

== Final standings ==
Rk	Team	W	L
1st place, gold medalist(s)	Japan	10	0
2nd place, silver medalist(s)	United States	9	2
Failed to qualify for the gold medal game
3rd place, bronze medalist(s)	Australia	8	3
4	Canada	7	3
Failed to qualify for the Medal round
5	Chinese Taipei	5	4
6	Netherlands	5	4
7	China	4	4
8	New Zealand	3	5
Failed to qualify for the Playoffs
9	Cuba	3	4
9	Italy	3	4
11	Czech Republic	3	4
12	Dominican Republic	3	4
13	Russia	2	5
14	Botswana	1	6
15	Puerto Rico	0	7
16	Great Britain	0	7

2014 ISF Women's World champions

Japan
3rd title
