= Softball at the 2007 Pan American Games =

Medalists
| Gold medal | United States |
| Silver medal | Canada |
| Silver medal | Venezuela |

Softball at the 2007 Pan American Games took place at a temporary stadium for 2,000 spectators in the City of Rock, at Barra da Tijuca, the same place that hosted the Rock in Rio 3.

United States is the reigning Pan American Games champion in the women's competition. Canada is the reigning men's champion, but the men's competition was discontinued. The women's podium of the 2003 Pan American Games is completed by Canada with the silver and Dominican Republic.

The 8 teams play a round-robin tournament. The semifinals will be played by #1 against #2 and #3 against #4. The semi-final game between the #3 and #4 ranked teams is an elimination game, with the loser out. The winner faces the loser of the other semifinal in the bronze medal game. The loser of the bronze medal game received the bronze medal. The winner of that game faces the winner of the other semifinal in the gold medal game, with the winner of that game receiving gold and the loser receiving silver.

Play began on July 23, with the semifinals on July 27 and the finals on July 28.

Due to rain cancellation, the USA automatically won gold, while Canada and Venezuela shared silver.

== Group A ==
| Rank | Team | W | L | RF | RA |
|---|---|---|---|---|---|
| 1 | United States | 3 | 0 | 21 | 0 |
| 2 | Cuba | 2 | 1 | 11 | 11 |
| 3 | Colombia | 1 | 2 | 3 | 14 |
| 4 | Brazil | 0 | 2 | 0 | 10 |

== Group B ==
| Rank | Team | W | L | RF | RA |
|---|---|---|---|---|---|
| 1 | Canada | 3 | 0 | 12 | 5 |
| 2 | Venezuela | 2 | 1 | 10 | 1 |
| 3 | Argentina | 1 | 2 | 5 | 13 |
| 4 | Puerto Rico | 0 | 3 | 4 | 12 |

== Medal round ==
Semifinals
United States | 7
Canada | 0
Venezuela | 2
Cuba | 1

Bronze-medal game
Canada | Cancelled
Venezuela

Gold-medal game
United States

=== Semifinals ===
| Cuba | 1 - 2 | Venezuela |

City of Rock, Barra da Tijuca

| United States | 7 - 0 | Canada |

City of Rock, Barra da Tijuca

=== Bronze-medal match ===
| CANCELLED | v | CANCELLED |

City of Rock, Barra da Tijuca

=== Gold-medal match ===
| CANCELLED | v | CANCELLED |

City of Rock, Barra da Tijuca
