= Softball at the 1987 Pan American Games =

Softball was contested by participating nations at the 1987 Pan American Games in Indianapolis, Indiana, United States.

== Medal summary ==
=== Medal table ===
Rank	Nation	Gold	Silver	Bronze	Total
1	United States	1	1	0	2
2	Canada	1	0	1	2
3	Puerto Rico	0	1	0	1
4	Cuba	0	0	1	1
Totals (4 entries)		2	2	2	6

=== Medalists ===
Event	Gold	Silver	Bronze
Men's	Canada	United States	Cuba
Women's	United States	Puerto Rico	Canada
