= Softball at the 1983 Pan American Games =

Softball was contested by participating nations at the 1983 Pan American Games in Caracas, Venezuela.

== Medal summary ==
=== Medal table ===
Rank	Nation	Gold	Silver	Bronze	Total
1	Canada	2	0	0	2
2	United States	0	2	0	2
3	Belize	0	0	1	1
3	Panama	0	0	1	1
Totals (4 entries)		2	2	2	6

=== Medalists ===
Event	Gold	Silver	Bronze
Men's	Canada	United States	Panama
Women's	Canada	United States	Belize
