= 2026 Men's Softball Pan American Championship =

Tournament details
- Host country: Colombia
- Dates: 21 – 28 February 2025
- Teams: 13
- Venues: 2 (in 1 host city)
- Defending champions: Argentina

Final positions
- Champions: Mexico (1st title)
- Runner-up: Argentina
- Third place: Venezuela
- Fourth place: Canada

Tournament statistics
- Games played: 59

The 2026 Men's Softball Pan American Championship is a 13th Men's Softball Pan American Championship tournament which was held from 21 to 28 February 2026 in Monteria, Colombia.

The tournament served as the qualifiers for the 2029 Men's Softball World Cup. The top five teams qualified for the World Cup. Furthermore, this tournament also determined qualification for the 2026 Central American and Caribbean Games and the 2027 Pan American Games.

Mexico defeated Argentina 1-0 to win their first championship. Argentina aimed for a third consecutive victory but ultimately failed to win the title. Mexico, Argentina, Venezuela, Canada, and the United States have qualified for the 2029 Men's Softball World Cup.

== Participants ==
- Argentina
- Aruba
- Canada
- Colombia (hosts)
- Cuba
- Dominican Republic
- Guatemala
- Mexico
- Panama
- Peru
- Puerto Rico
- United States
- Venezuela

== Opening round ==
=== Group A ===
Pos	Team	Pld	W	L	RF	RA	RD	PCT	GB	Qualification
1	Argentina	4	4	0	39	0	+39	1.000	—	Advance to Super Round
2	Cuba	4	3	1	25	9	+16	.750	1	Advance to Super Round
3	Panama	4	2	2	8	20	−12	.500	2	Advance to Super Round
4	Puerto Rico	4	1	3	8	18	−10	.250	3	Advance to 10–12th places classification
5	Aruba	4	0	4	4	37	−33	.000	4	Advance to 10–12th places classification

Source: WBSC Americas

Date	Local time	Road team	Score	Home team	Inn.	Venue	Game duration	Attendance	Boxscore
Feb 21, 2026	10:00	Aruba	2–9	Cuba	F/5	Estadio Jose Gabriel Amin Manzur	1:26		Boxscore
Feb 21, 2026	12:30	Cuba	8–1	Panama	F/6	Estadio Jose Gabriel Amin Manzur	1:38		Boxscore
Feb 21, 2026	15:00	Argentina	11–0	Panama	F/5	Estadio Jose Gabriel Amin Manzur			Boxscore
Feb 21, 2026	17:30	Puerto Rico	0–7	Argentina	F/5	Estadio Jose Gabriel Amin Manzur			Boxscore
Feb 22, 2026	9:00	Panama	2–0	Puerto Rico		Estadio Luis Escobar Pocaterra	1:31	35	Boxscore
Feb 22, 2026	11:30	Puerto Rico	0–8	Cuba	F/6	Estadio Luis Escobar Pocaterra	1:35	27	Boxscore
Feb 22, 2026	17:30	Argentina	15–0	Aruba	F/4	Estadio Jose Gabriel Amin Manzur	1:20	194	Boxscore
Feb 23, 2026	9:00	Panama	5–1	Aruba		Estadio Luis Escobar Pocaterra	2:01	85	Boxscore
Feb 23, 2026	10:00	Cuba	0–6	Argentina		Estadio Jose Gabriel Amin Manzur	1:55	78	Boxscore
Feb 23, 2026	11:30	Aruba	1–8	Puerto Rico	F/5	Estadio Luis Escobar Pocaterra	1:40	77	Boxscore

=== Group B ===
Pos	Team	Pld	W	L	RF	RA	RD	PCT	GB	Qualification
1	Venezuela	3	3	0	18	4	+14	1.000	—	Advance to Super Round
2	Canada	3	2	1	18	4	+14	.667	1	Advance to Super Round
3	Colombia (H)	3	1	2	14	16	−2	.333	2	Advance to Super Round
4	Peru	3	0	3	2	28	−26	.000	3	Advance to 10–13th places classification

Source: WBSC Americas
(H) Hosts

Date	Local time	Road team	Score	Home team	Inn.	Venue	Game duration	Attendance	Boxscore
Feb 21, 2026	11:30	Venezuela	2–1	Canada		Estadio Luis Escobar Pocaterra	2:21	85	Boxscore
Feb 21, 2026	20:00	Colombia	10–1	Peru		Estadio Jose Gabriel Amin Manzur	2:23		Boxscore
Feb 22, 2026	15:00	Peru	0–10	Venezuela	F/4	Estadio Jose Gabriel Amin Manzur	1:12	170	Boxscore
Feb 22, 2026	20:00	Canada	9–1	Colombia	F/6	Estadio Jose Gabriel Amin Manzur	2:16	224	Boxscore
Feb 23, 2026	17:30	Peru	1–8	Canada	F/5	Estadio Jose Gabriel Amin Manzur	1:23	117	Boxscore
Feb 23, 2026	20:00	Venezuela	6–3	Colombia		Estadio Jose Gabriel Amin Manzur	2:26	211	Boxscore

=== Group C ===
Pos	Team	Pld	W	L	RF	RA	RD	PCT	GB	Qualification
1	Mexico	3	2	1	9	6	+3	.667 (Note: TQB)	—	Advance to Super Round
2	United States	3	2	1	8	7	+1	.667	—	Advance to Super Round
3	Dominican Republic	3	2	1	16	9	+7	.667	—	Advance to Super Round
4	Guatemala	3	0	3	2	13	−11	.000	2	Advance to 10–13th places classification

Source: WBSC Americas
Notes:

Date	Local time	Road team	Score	Home team	Inn.	Venue	Game duration	Attendance	Boxscore
Feb 21, 2026	9:00	Dominican Republic	9–0	Guatemala	F/5	Estadio Luis Escobar Pocaterra	1:52	54	Boxscore
Feb 21, 2026	14:00	United States	0–4	Mexico		Estadio Luis Escobar Pocaterra	1:58	155	Boxscore
Feb 22, 2026	10:00	United States	3–2	Guatemala		Estadio Jose Gabriel Amin Manzur	1:55	152	Boxscore
Feb 22, 2026	12:30	Mexico	4–6	Dominican Republic		Estadio Jose Gabriel Amin Manzur	2:44	100	Boxscore
Feb 23, 2026	12:30	Dominican Republic	1–5	United States		Estadio Jose Gabriel Amin Manzur	2:20	96	Boxscore
Feb 23, 2026	15:00	Guatemala	0–1	Mexico		Estadio Jose Gabriel Amin Manzur	1:46	107	Boxscore

== 10–13th places classification ==
Results from matches already played are carried over.

Pos	Team	Pld	W	L	RF	RA	RD	PCT	GB	Qualification
1	Guatemala	3	3	0	28	1	+27	1.000	—	Rank 10
2	Puerto Rico	3	2	1	14	15	−1	.667	1	Rank 11
3	Peru	3	1	2	11	12	−1	.333	2	Rank 12
4	Aruba	3	0	3	1	26	−25	.000	3	Rank 13

Source: WBSC Americas

Date	Local time	Road team	Score	Home team	Inn.	Venue	Game duration	Attendance	Boxscore
Feb 25, 2026	18:00	Peru	0–7	Guatemala	F/6	Estadio Luis Escobar Pocaterra		77	Boxscore
Feb 25, 2026	20:30	Aruba	0–7	Peru	F/5	Estadio Luis Escobar Pocaterra	1:19	50	Boxscore
Feb 26, 2026	20:00	Aruba	0–11	Guatemala	F/4	Estadio Luis Escobar Pocaterra	1:18	13	Boxscore
Feb 27, 2026	17:30	Puerto Rico	5–4	Peru		Estadio Luis Escobar Pocaterra	2:44	57	Boxscore
Feb , 2026	20:00	Puerto Rico	1–10	Guatemala	F/5	Estadio Luis Escobar Pocaterra	1:31	45	Boxscore

== Super round ==
Results from matches already played are carried over.

Pos	Team	Pld	W	L	RF	RA	RD	PCT	GB	Qualification
1	Argentina	8	6	2	0	0	0	.750	—	Advance to Final
2	Mexico	8	6	2	0	0	0	.750	—	Advance to Final
3	Venezuela	8	6	2	0	0	0	.750	—	Advance to Bronze medal game
4	Canada	8	5	3	0	0	0	.625	1	Advance to Bronze medal game
5	United States	8	4	4	0	0	0	.500	2	Advance to 5th place game
6	Dominican Republic	8	4	4	0	0	0	.500	2	Advance to 5th place game
7	Panama	8	2	6	0	0	0	.250	4	Rank 7
8	Colombia (H)	8	2	6	0	0	0	.250	4	Rank 8
9	Cuba	8	1	7	0	0	0	.125	5	Rank 9

Source: WBSC Americas
(H) Hosts

Date	Local time	Road team	Score	Home team	Inn.	Venue	Game duration	Attendance	Boxscore
Feb 24, 2026	19:00	Cuba	0–1	Venezuela		Estadio Jose Gabriel Amin Manzur	1:41	96	Boxscore
Feb 24, 2026	21:30	Panama	1–2	Venezuela		Estadio Jose Gabriel Amin Manzur	1:55	54	Boxscore
Feb 25, 2026	9:30	Canada	1–4	Mexico		Estadio Jose Gabriel Amin Manzur	2:23	86	Boxscore
Feb 25, 2026	10:30	Dominican Republic	7–0	Argentina	F/5	Estadio Luis Escobar Pocaterra	1:58	42	Boxscore
Feb 25, 2026	12:00	Colombia	3–10	Panama	F/5	Estadio Jose Gabriel Amin Manzur	2:06	123	Boxscore
Feb 25, 2026	13:00	Argentina	11–0	Mexico	F/4	Estadio Luis Escobar Pocaterra	1:54	65	Boxscore
Feb 25, 2026	14:30	Cuba	2–4	Canada		Estadio Jose Gabriel Amin Manzur	2:32	151	Boxscore
Feb 25, 2026	15:30	Colombia	1–0	Dominican Republic		Estadio Luis Escobar Pocaterra	2:14	143	Boxscore
Feb 25, 2026	17:00	Panama	0–4	United States		Estadio Jose Gabriel Amin Manzur	2:05	152	Boxscore
Feb 25, 2026	19:30	Cuba	1–4	United States		Estadio Jose Gabriel Amin Manzur	1:52	84	Boxscore
Feb 26, 2026	9:00	Colombia	0–5	Argentina		Estadio Jose Gabriel Amin Manzur	2:03		Boxscore
Feb 26, 2026	10:00	Cuba	0–3	Mexico		Estadio Luis Escobar Pocaterra	2:00	45	Boxscore
Feb 26, 2026	11:30	United States	0–7	Argentina	F/5	Estadio Jose Gabriel Amin Manzur	2:04		Boxscore
Feb 26, 2026	12:30	Dominican Republic	1–3	Venezuela		Estadio Luis Escobar Pocaterra	2:41	45	Boxscore
Feb 26, 2026	14:00	Canada	4–0	United States		Estadio Jose Gabriel Amin Manzur	2:12	85	Boxscore
Feb 26, 2026	15:00	Panama	4–3	Dominican Republic		Estadio Luis Escobar Pocaterra	2:11	67	Boxscore
Feb 26, 2026	16:30	Mexico	1–0	Venezuela		Estadio Jose Gabriel Amin Manzur	2:12	125	Boxscore
Feb 26, 2026	17:30	Panama	0–4	Canada		Estadio Luis Escobar Pocaterra	1:54	72	Boxscore
Feb 26, 2026	19:00	Colombia	5–0	Cuba		Estadio Jose Gabriel Amin Manzur	1:46	134	Boxscore
Feb 27, 2026	9:00	Colombia	3–6	Mexico		Estadio Jose Gabriel Amin Manzur	2:09	68	Boxscore
Feb 27, 2026	10:00	Dominican Republic	5–1	Canada		Estadio Luis Escobar Pocaterra	2:26	15	Boxscore
Feb 27, 2026	11:30	United States	0–2	Venezuela		Estadio Jose Gabriel Amin Manzur	2:08		Boxscore
Feb 27, 2026	12:30	Dominican Republic	4–0	Cuba		Estadio Luis Escobar Pocaterra	1:49	18	Boxscore
Feb 27, 2026	14:00	Colombia	0–5	United States		Estadio Jose Gabriel Amin Manzur			Boxscore
Feb 27, 2026	15:00	Panama	2–4	Mexico		Estadio Luis Escobar Pocaterra	2:15	53	Boxscore
Feb 27, 2026	16:30	Venezuela	0–2	Argentina		Estadio Jose Gabriel Amin Manzur	2:08	172	Boxscore
Feb 27, 2026	19:00	Canada	1–0	Argentina		Estadio Jose Gabriel Amin Manzur	2:07	85	Boxscore

== Finals ==
=== 5th place game ===
Date	Local time	Road team	Score	Home team	Inn.	Venue	Game duration	Attendance	Boxscore
Feb 28, 2026	9:00	Dominican Republic	0–7	United States		Estadio Jose Gabriel Amin Manzur	1:31	60	Boxscore

=== Bronze medal game ===
Date	Local time	Road team	Score	Home team	Inn.	Venue	Game duration	Attendance	Boxscore
Feb 28, 2026	11:30	Canada	0–1	Venezuela		Estadio Jose Gabriel Amin Manzur	1:58	82	Boxscore

=== Final ===
Date	Local time	Road team	Score	Home team	Inn.	Venue	Game duration	Attendance	Boxscore
Feb 28, 2026	14:00	Mexico	1–0	Argentina	F/9	Estadio Jose Gabriel Amin Manzur	2:44	176	Boxscore

== Final standings ==
Qualification
2029 Men's Softball World Cup Group Stages

Rank	Team
Gold medal	Mexico
Silver medal	Argentina
Bronze medal	Venezuela
4th	Canada
5th	United States
6th	Dominican Republic
7th	Panama
8th	Colombia
9th	Cuba
10th	Guatemala
11th	Puerto Rico
12th	Peru
13th	Aruba

== External websites ==
- Official website
