= South American U-15 Women's Softball Championship =

- Sport: Softball
- Continent: South America

The South American U-15 Women's Softball Championship is the main championship tournament between national women softball teams in South America, governed by the Pan American Softball Federation.

== Results ==
Year	Host	Final		Semifinalists	
Year	Host	Champions	Runners-up	3rd place	4th place
2015	(Peru); Chincha	Brazil	Peru Red	Ecuador	Peru White
2016	(Peru); Lima	Brazil	Argentina	Peru Red	Peru White
2017	(Peru); Trujillo	Brazil	Argentina	Peru Red	Peru White
2018	(Peru); Lima	Brazil	Peru Red	Argentina	Peru White
2019	(Peru); Lima	Peru Red	Brazil	Colombia	Argentina
2021	(Ecuador); Manta	Mexico	Peru	Brazil	Colombia
2024	(Argentina); Buenos Aires	Brazil	Peru	Argentina Sky Blue	Argentina Blue

=== Medal table ===
Rank	Nation	Gold	Silver	Bronze	Total
1	Brazil	5	1	1	7
2	Peru	1	4	2	7
3	Mexico	1	0	0	1
4	Argentina	0	2	2	4
5	Colombia	0	0	1	1
5	Ecuador	0	0	1	1
Totals (6 entries)		7	7	7	21

=== Participating nations ===
Nation	(Peru) 2015	(Peru) 2016	(Peru) 2017	(Peru) 2018	(Peru) 2019	(Ecuador) 2021	(Argentina) 2024	Years
Argentina	-	2nd	2nd	3rd	4th	-	-	4
Argentina Blue	-	-	-	-	-	-	4th	1
Argentina Sky Blue	-	-	-	-	-	-	3rd	1
Argentina White	-	-	-	-	-	-	5th	1
Aruba	5th	-	-	-	-	-	-	1
Bolivia	6th	-	-	-	-	-	-	1
Brazil	1st	1st	1st	1st	2nd	3rd	1st	7
Chile	-	6th	6th	-	6th	-	-	3
Colombia	-	5th	-	6th	3rd	4th	-	4
Ecuador	3rd	7th	5th	5th	7th	-	-	5
Ecuador Blue	-	-	-	-	-	5th	-	1
Ecuador Yellow	-	-	-	-	-	6th	-	1
Guatemala	-	-	-	-	8th	-	-	1
Mexico	-	-	-	-	-	1st	-	1
Peru	-	-	-	-	-	2nd	2nd	2
Peru Red	2nd	3rd	3rd	2nd	1st	-	-	5
Peru White	4th	4th	4th	4th	5th	-	-	5
Total	6	7	6	6	8	6	5	
