= 2025 Women's Softball Pan American Championship =

International softball tournament

Tournament details
- Host country: Colombia
- Dates: 27 June – 4 July 2025
- Teams: 15
- Venues: 2 (in 1 host city)
- Defending champions: United States

Final positions
- Champions: Canada (1st title)
- Runner-up: Puerto Rico
- Third place: Cuba
- Fourth place: Mexico

Tournament statistics
- Games played: 66

The 2025 Women's Softball Pan American Championship is a 11th Women's Softball Pan American Championship tournament which was held from 27 June to 4 July 2025 in Monteria, Colombia.

The tournament served as the qualifiers for the 2027 Women's Softball World Cup. The top five teams qualified for the World Cup.

Canada defeated Puerto Rico 6-0 to win their first championship.

== Participants ==
- Argentina
- Aruba
- Brazil
- Canada
- Chile
- Colombia (hosts)
- Cuba
- Dominican Republic
- El Salvador
- Guatemala
- U.S. Virgin Islands
- Mexico
- Peru
- Puerto Rico
- Venezuela

== Opening round ==
=== Group A ===
Pos	Team	Pld	W	L	RF	RA	RD	PCT	GB	Qualification
1	Canada	4	4	0	43	1	+42	1.000	—	Advance to Super Round
2	Colombia (H)	4	3	1	18	14	+4	.750	1	Advance to Super Round
3	Argentina	4	2	2	9	15	−6	.500	2	Advance to Super Round
4	Peru	4	1	3	13	16	−3	.250	3	Advance to 10–12th places classification
5	Chile	4	0	4	4	41	−37	.000	4	Advance to 13–15st places classification

Source: WBSC Americas
(H) Hosts

Date	Local time	Road team	Score	Home team	Inn.	Venue	Game duration	Attendance	Boxscore
Jun 27, 2025	10:00	Peru	0–3	Argentina		Estadio Jose Gabriel Amin Manzur	2:02	100	Boxscore
Jun 27, 2025	14:00	Chile	0–14	Canada	F/4	Estadio Luis Escobar Pocaterra	1:10	93	Boxscore
Jun 27, 2025	21:00	Canada	14–1	Colombia	F/4	Estadio Jose Gabriel Amin Manzur	1:26	1,500	Boxscore
Jun 28, 2025	17:10	Peru	13–1	Chile	F/4	Estadio Luis Escobar Pocaterra	1:42	180	Boxscore
Jun 28, 2025	19:40	Argentina	0–7	Canada	F/5	Estadio Luis Escobar Pocaterra	1:53	180	Boxscore
Jun 28, 2025	21:30	Colombia	8–0	Chile	F/5	Estadio Jose Gabriel Amin Manzur	1:11	503	Boxscore
Jun 29, 2025	14:00	Chile	3–6	Argentina		Estadio Luis Escobar Pocaterra	2:08	197	Boxscore
Jun 29, 2025	16:30	Canada	8–0	Peru	F/5	Estadio Luis Escobar Pocaterra	1:18	63	Boxscore
Jun 29, 2025	17:30	Argentina	0–5	Colombia	F/6	Estadio Jose Gabriel Amin Manzur	2:02		Boxscore
Jun 30, 2025	11:30	Colombia	4–0	Peru		Estadio Jose Gabriel Amin Manzur	2:14	130	Boxscore

=== Group B ===
Pos	Team	Pld	W	L	RF	RA	RD	PCT	GB	Qualification
1	Cuba	4	4	0	11	2	+9	1.000	—	Advance to Super Round
2	Mexico	4	3	1	17	3	+14	.750	1	Advance to Super Round
3	Brazil	4	2	2	9	10	−1	.500	2	Advance to Super Round
4	Dominican Republic	4	1	3	9	18	−9	.250	3	Advance to 10–12th places classification
5	U.S. Virgin Islands	4	0	4	2	15	−13	.000	4	Advance to 13–15st places classification

Source: WBSC Americas

Date	Local time	Road team	Score	Home team	Inn.	Venue	Game duration	Attendance	Boxscore
Jun 27, 2025	9:00	U.S. Virgin Islands	0–1	Cuba		Estadio Luis Escobar Pocaterra	1:22	107	Boxscore
Jun 27, 2025	11:30	Mexico	5–2	Brazil		Estadio Luis Escobar Pocaterra	1:55	40	Boxscore
Jun 27, 2025	16:30	Brazil	4–1	Dominican Republic		Estadio Luis Escobar Pocaterra	1:47	92	Boxscore
Jun 27, 2025	19:00	Cuba	7–2	Dominican Republic		Estadio Luis Escobar Pocaterra	1:49	78	Boxscore
Jun 28, 2025	11:30	Mexico	5–0	U.S. Virgin Islands		Estadio Luis Escobar Pocaterra	2:05	50	Boxscore
Jun 28, 2025	14:40	Dominican Republic	6–0	U.S. Virgin Islands		Estadio Luis Escobar Pocaterra	2:04	120	Boxscore
Jun 28, 2025	22:10	Brazil	0–2	Cuba		Estadio Luis Escobar Pocaterra	1:34	180	Boxscore
Jun 29, 2025	10:00	Dominican Republic	0–7	Mexico	F/6	Estadio Jose Gabriel Amin Manzur	1:54	143	Boxscore
Jun 29, 2025	11:30	U.S. Virgin Islands	2–3	Brazil	F/9	Estadio Luis Escobar Pocaterra	2:45	174	Boxscore
Jun 29, 2025	12:30	Cuba	1–0	Mexico		Estadio Jose Gabriel Amin Manzur	1:50		Boxscore

=== Group C ===
Pos	Team	Pld	W	L	RF	RA	RD	PCT	GB	Qualification
1	Puerto Rico	4	4	0	39	2	+37	1.000	—	Advance to Super Round
2	Venezuela	4	3	1	34	12	+22	.750	1	Advance to Super Round
3	El Salvador	4	2	2	20	20	0	.500	2	Advance to Super Round
4	Guatemala	4	1	3	8	30	−22	.250	3	Advance to 10–12th places classification
5	Aruba	4	0	4	3	40	−37	.000	4	Advance to 13–15st places classification

Source: WBSC Americas

Date	Local time	Road team	Score	Home team	Inn.	Venue	Game duration	Attendance	Boxscore
Jun 27, 2025	12:30	Aruba	0–10	Puerto Rico	F/4	Estadio Jose Gabriel Amin Manzur	1:14	1,000	Boxscore
Jun 27, 2025	15:00	Puerto Rico	10–0	El Salvador	F/5	Estadio Jose Gabriel Amin Manzur	1:39	1,500	Boxscore
Jun 27, 2025	17:30	Venezuela	11–2	Guatemala		Estadio Jose Gabriel Amin Manzur	1:54	1,500	Boxscore
Jun 28, 2025	12:30	Guatemala	0–8	El Salvador	F/5	Estadio Jose Gabriel Amin Manzur	1:18	507	Boxscore
Jun 28, 2025	14:30	Guatemala	1–11	Puerto Rico	F/4	Estadio Jose Gabriel Amin Manzur	1:18	166	Boxscore
Jun 28, 2025	16:30	El Salvador	10–3	Aruba	F/5	Estadio Jose Gabriel Amin Manzur	2:05	374	Boxscore
Jun 28, 2025	19:00	Venezuela	15–0	Aruba	F/4	Estadio Jose Gabriel Amin Manzur	1:13	417	Boxscore
Jun 29, 2025	9:00	Aruba	0–5	Guatemala		Estadio Luis Escobar Pocaterra	1:33	83	Boxscore
Jun 29, 2025	15:00	Puerto Rico	8–1	Venezuela		Estadio Jose Gabriel Amin Manzur	1:49	204	Boxscore
Jun 30, 2025	9:00	El Salvador	2–7	Venezuela		Estadio Jose Gabriel Amin Manzur		113	Boxscore

== 13–15th places classification ==
Pos	Team	Pld	W	L	RF	RA	RD	PCT	GB	Qualification
1	U.S. Virgin Islands	2	2	0	11	0	+11	1.000	—	Rank 13
2	Chile	2	1	1	8	2	+6	.500	1	Rank 14
3	Aruba	2	0	2	1	18	−17	.000	2	Rank 15

Source: WBSC Americas

Date	Local time	Road team	Score	Home team	Inn.	Venue	Game duration	Attendance	Boxscore
Jun 30, 2025	13:00	Chile	0–1	U.S. Virgin Islands		Estadio Luis Escobar Pocaterra	1:40	87	Boxscore
Jul 1, 2025	16:30	Aruba	0–10	U.S. Virgin Islands	F/4	Estadio Luis Escobar Pocaterra	1:09	151	Boxscore
Jul 2, 2025	14:00	Aruba	1–8	Chile	F/6	Estadio Luis Escobar Pocaterra	1:50	173	Boxscore

== 10–12th places classification ==
Pos	Team	Pld	W	L	RF	RA	RD	PCT	GB	Qualification
1	Dominican Republic	2	2	0	16	2	+14	1.000	—	Rank 10
2	Peru	2	1	1	5	8	−3	.500	1	Rank 11
3	Guatemala	2	0	2	3	14	−11	.000	2	Rank 12

Source: WBSC Americas

Date	Local time	Road team	Score	Home team	Inn.	Venue	Game duration	Attendance	Boxscore
Jun 30, 2025	18:00	Guatemala	2–9	Dominican Republic	F/6	Estadio Luis Escobar Pocaterra	1:55	87	Boxscore
Jun 30, 2025	20:30	Dominican Republic	7–0	Peru		Estadio Luis Escobar Pocaterra	2:16	57	Boxscore
Jul 3, 2025	18:30	Guatemala	1–5	Peru		Estadio Luis Escobar Pocaterra	1:49		Boxscore

== Super round ==
Results from matches already played are carried over.

Pos	Team	Pld	W	L	RF	RA	RD	PCT	GB	Qualification
1	Canada	8	6	2	49	7	+42	.750 (Note: Among the four teams: 2 wins, 1 loss; Head-to-head result: Canada 5–0 Puerto Rico)	—	Advance to Final
2	Puerto Rico	8	6	2	45	13	+32	.750	—	Advance to Final
3	Cuba	8	6	2	22	13	+9	.750 (Note: Among the four teams: 1 win, 2 losses; Head-to-head result: Cuba 1–0 Mexico)	—	Advance to Bronze medal game
4	Mexico	8	6	2	26	13	+13	.750	—	Advance to Bronze medal game
5	Venezuela	8	5	3	23	19	+4	.625	1	Advance to 5th place game
6	Brazil	8	3	5	19	24	−5	.375 (Note: Head-to-head result: Brazil 1–0 Colombia)	3	Advance to 5th place game
7	Colombia (H)	8	3	5	19	32	−13	.375	3	Rank 7
8	El Salvador	8	1	7	6	56	−50	.125	5	Rank 8
9	Argentina	8	0	8	9	41	−32	.000	6	Rank 9

Source: WBSC Americas
(H) Hosts
Notes:

Date	Local time	Road team	Score	Home team	Inn.	Venue	Game duration	Attendance	Boxscore
Jun 30, 2025	14:00	Brazil	2–4	Puerto Rico		Estadio Jose Gabriel Amin Manzur	1:52	207	Boxscore
Jun 30, 2025	15:30	El Salvador	0–6	Cuba		Estadio Luis Escobar Pocaterra	2:02	73	Boxscore
Jun 30, 2025	16:30	Mexico	3–1	Canada		Estadio Jose Gabriel Amin Manzur	2:01	475	Boxscore
Jun 30, 2025	19:00	Argentina	4–8	Venezuela		Estadio Jose Gabriel Amin Manzur	2:06	531	Boxscore
Jun 30, 2025	21:30	Colombia	1–6	Cuba		Estadio Jose Gabriel Amin Manzur	2:27	428	Boxscore
Jul 1, 2025	9:00	El Salvador	0–6	Mexico		Estadio Luis Escobar Pocaterra	1:46	57	Boxscore
Jul 1, 2025	10:00	Argentina	1–2	Brazil		Estadio Jose Gabriel Amin Manzur			Boxscore
Jul 1, 2025	11:30	Mexico	1–0	Venezuela		Estadio Luis Escobar Pocaterra	1:46	72	Boxscore
Jul 1, 2025	12:30	Argentina	1–5	Cuba		Estadio Jose Gabriel Amin Manzur	1:55		Boxscore
Jul 1, 2025	14:00	Brazil	1–2	Venezuela		Estadio Luis Escobar Pocaterra	1:59	137	Boxscore
Jul 1, 2025	15:00	El Salvador	0–7	Canada	F/5	Estadio Jose Gabriel Amin Manzur	1:25		Boxscore
Jul 1, 2025	17:30	Canada	5–0	Puerto Rico		Estadio Jose Gabriel Amin Manzur	1:48		Boxscore
Jul 1, 2025	20:00	Colombia	2–1	Puerto Rico		Estadio Jose Gabriel Amin Manzur	1:28		Boxscore
Jul 2, 2025	10:00	Argentina	1–8	Puerto Rico	F/5	Estadio Jose Gabriel Amin Manzur	1:45	56	Boxscore
Jul 2, 2025	11:30	Venezuela	0–1	Cuba		Estadio Luis Escobar Pocaterra	1:14		Boxscore
Jul 2, 2025	12:30	Mexico	2–7	Puerto Rico		Estadio Jose Gabriel Amin Manzur	1:58	76	Boxscore
Jul 2, 2025	15:00	Brazil	0–10	Canada	F/4	Estadio Jose Gabriel Amin Manzur	1:13		Boxscore
Jul 2, 2025	16:30	Argentina	1–4	Mexico		Estadio Luis Escobar Pocaterra	2:16		Boxscore
Jul 2, 2025	17:30	Brazil	1–0	Colombia		Estadio Jose Gabriel Amin Manzur	2:04		Boxscore
Jul 2, 2025	20:00	El Salvador	2–8	Colombia		Estadio Jose Gabriel Amin Manzur	2:22		Boxscore
Jul 3, 2025	10:00	Cuba	0–7	Puerto Rico	F/6	Estadio Jose Gabriel Amin Manzur	1:37	66	Boxscore
Jul 3, 2025	13:30	Brazil	11–0	El Salvador	F/4	Estadio Luis Escobar Pocaterra	1:19	65	Boxscore
Jul 3, 2025	14:30	Cuba	1–4	Canada		Estadio Jose Gabriel Amin Manzur	1:49	88	Boxscore
Jul 3, 2025	16:00	El Salvador	2–1	Argentina		Estadio Luis Escobar Pocaterra	2:00		Boxscore
Jul 3, 2025	17:00	Venezuela	2–1	Canada		Estadio Jose Gabriel Amin Manzur	1:53	306	Boxscore
Jul 3, 2025	19:30	Colombia	1–3	Venezuela		Estadio Jose Gabriel Amin Manzur	1:39	435	Boxscore
Jul 3, 2025	21:00	Colombia	1–5	Mexico		Estadio Jose Gabriel Amin Manzur	1:57		Boxscore

== Finals ==
=== 5th place game ===
Date	Local time	Road team	Score	Home team	Inn.	Venue	Game duration	Attendance	Boxscore
Jul 4, 2025	15:30	Brazil	1–2	Venezuela		Estadio Jose Gabriel Amin Manzur	1:39		Boxscore

=== Bronze medal game ===
Date	Local time	Road team	Score	Home team	Inn.	Venue	Game duration	Attendance	Boxscore
Jul 4, 2025	18:00	Mexico	0–3	Cuba		Estadio Jose Gabriel Amin Manzur	1:49		Boxscore

=== Final ===
Date	Local time	Road team	Score	Home team	Inn.	Venue	Game duration	Attendance	Boxscore
Jul 4, 2025	20:30	Puerto Rico	0–6	Canada		Estadio Jose Gabriel Amin Manzur	1:41		Boxscore

== Final standings ==
Qualification
2027 Women's Softball World Cup Group Stages

Rank	Team
Gold medal	Canada
Silver medal	Puerto Rico
Bronze medal	Cuba
4th	Mexico
5th	Venezuela
6th	Brazil
7th	Colombia
8th	El Salvador
9th	Argentina
10th	Dominican Republic
11th	Peru
12th	Guatemala
13th	U.S. Virgin Islands
14th	Chile
15th	Aruba

== External websites ==
- Official website
