= 2023 U-15 Pan American Women's Softball Championship =

Women's softball tournament

Tournament details
- Host country: Peru
- Dates: 1 April–8 April 2023
- Teams: 10

Final positions
- Champions: United States (1st title)
- Runner-up: Mexico
- Third place: Puerto Rico
- Fourth place: Brazil

The 2023 U-15 Pan American Women's Softball Championship was an international softball tournament which featured ten nations and was held from 1 April–8 April 2023 in Lima, Peru.

== Preliminary round ==
=== Group A ===
Teams	W	L	Pct.
United States	4	0	1.000
Peru	3	1	.750
Brazil	2	2	.500
Colombia	1	3	.250
Guatemala	0	4	.000

=== Group B ===
Teams	W	L	Pct.
Mexico	4	0	1.000
Puerto Rico	2	2	.500
Venezuela	2	2	.500
Argentina	1	3	.250
Ecuador	0	4	.000

== Super round ==
Team	Score	Team
Venezuela	0–17	United States
Peru	0–1	Mexico
Brazil	4–5	Mexico
Brazil	0–6	Puerto Rico
Mexico	0–14	United States
Venezuela	2–9	Brazil
Venezuela	6–0	Peru
Peru	1–2	Puerto Rico

== Third place game ==
Team	1	2	3	4	5	R	H	E
Brazil	0	0	0	0	2	2	0	0
Puerto Rico	1	1	2	0	1	5	0	0
Boxscore

== Final ==
Team	1	2	3	4	5	R	H	E
Mexico	0	0	0	0	0	0	3	0
United States	1	0	0	8	X	9	9	0
Boxscore

== Final standings ==
Rank	Team
1st place, gold medalist(s)	United States
2nd place, silver medalist(s)	Mexico
3rd place, bronze medalist(s)	Puerto Rico
4th	Brazil
5th	Venezuela
6th	Peru
7th	Colombia
8th	Argentina
9th	Ecuador
10th	Guatemala
