= USA Softball International Cup =

Annual women's softball tournament

Tournament information
- Sport: Softball
- Established: 2005

Current champion
- United States (10th title)

Most recent tournament
- 2026 USA Softball International Cup

The USA Softball International Cup previously known as the World Cup of Softball, was an annual women's softball tournament. The first eight World Cups were held at the ASA Hall of Fame Stadium in Oklahoma City, Oklahoma. The competition is governed by USA Softball, which is also headquartered in Oklahoma City.

== History ==
The World Cup is a round robin format consisting of a number of teams from around the world. Each team plays each other once, then the two teams with the best records play in a one-game, winner-take-all championship. The number of teams has varied, with as few as 4 teams (in 2010) and as many as 14 teams (in 2016).

The official world competition was first held in 2005 and has been played every year since, with the exception of 2008 due to many national teams' participation in the 2008 Summer Olympics.

The World Cup of Softball was rebranded as the USA Softball International Cup starting the 2018 edition. After being held in 2019, the tournament went on a six-year hiatus before returning in 2026.

== Results ==
| Year | Final Host | Champions | Final score | Runners-up | Third place | Score | Fourth place |
| 2005 | Oklahoma City, Oklahoma | Japan | 3 – 1 | United States | Australia | 7 – 1 | China |
| 2006 | Oklahoma City, Oklahoma | United States | 5 – 2 | Japan | Canada | 2 – 0 | Australia |
| 2007 | Oklahoma City, Oklahoma | United States | 3 – 0 | Japan | Canada | 8 – 2 | China |
| 2009 | Oklahoma City, Oklahoma | United States | 3 – 1 | Australia | Canada | 4 – 1 | Japan |
| 2010 | Oklahoma City, Oklahoma | United States | 5 – 1 | Japan | United States Futures | 9 – 3 | Canada |
| 2011 | Oklahoma City, Oklahoma | United States | 6 – 4 | Japan | Canada | 4 – 1 | Australia |
| 2012 | Oklahoma City, Oklahoma | United States | 3 – 0 | Australia | Canada | 11 – 8 | Netherlands |
| 2013 | Oklahoma City, Oklahoma | Japan | 6 – 3 | United States | Australia | 4 – 3 | Canada |
| 2014 | Irvine, California | United States | 5 – 2 | Canada | Chinese Taipei | 3 – 1 | Japan |
| 2015 | Irvine, California | United States | 6 – 1 | Japan | Puerto Rico | 3 – 2 | Canada |
| 2016 | Oklahoma City, Oklahoma | Japan | 2 – 1 | United States | Australia | 4 – 3 | United States elite |
| 2017 | Oklahoma City, Oklahoma | Japan | 2 – 1 | United States | Canada | 3 – 0 | Australia |
| 2018 | Irvine, California | United States | 10 – 5 | Japan | United States Blue | 7 – 6 | China |
| 2019 | Columbus, Georgia | United States | 2 – 1 | Japan | United States U19 | 8 – 0 | (United States) Scrap Yard Fast Pitch |
| 2026 | Oklahoma City, Oklahoma | | | | | | |

=== Medal table ===
| Rank | Nation | Gold | Silver | Bronze | Total |
|---|---|---|---|---|---|
| 1 | United States | 10 | 4 | 0 | 14 |
| 2 | Japan | 4 | 7 | 0 | 11 |
| 3 | Australia | 0 | 2 | 3 | 5 |
| 4 | Canada | 0 | 1 | 6 | 7 |
| 5 | United States Futures | 0 | 0 | 1 | 1 |
| 5 | United States U19 | 0 | 0 | 1 | 1 |
| 5 | Chinese Taipei | 0 | 0 | 1 | 1 |
| 5 | Puerto Rico | 0 | 0 | 1 | 1 |
| 5 | United States Blue | 0 | 0 | 1 | 1 |
| Totals (9 entries) | | 14 | 14 | 14 | 42 |

== Participating nations and teams ==
- 1st — Champion
- 2nd — Runner-up
- 3rd — Third place
- # — Position
- q — Qualified
- — — Participated (Position unknown)

| Teams | 2005 | 2006 | 2007 | 2009 | 2010 | 2011 | 2012 | 2013 | 2014 | 2015 | 2016 | 2017 | 2018 | 2019 | 2026 | Years |
|---|---|---|---|---|---|---|---|---|---|---|---|---|---|---|---|---|
| American Samoa | | | | | | | | | | | | | | | q | 0 |
| Argentina | | | | | | | | | | 8th | | | | | | 1 |
| Australia | 3rd | 4th | | 2nd | | 4th | 2nd | 3rd | | | 3rd | 4th | | | q | 8 |
| Brazil | | | | | | | 6th | | | | | | | | | 1 |
| Canada | 5th | 3rd | 3rd | 3rd | 4th | 3rd | 3rd | 4th | 2nd | 4th | 5th | 3rd | — | | q | 13 |
| China | 4th | 5th | 4th | | | | | | | | 7th | | 4th | 6th | q | 6 |
| Chinese Taipei | | | | | | | | | 3rd | | | | — | 8th | q | 3 |
| Colombia | | | | | | | | | | | | | — | | | 1 |
| Czech Republic | | | | | | 6th | | | | | 13th | | — | | | 3 |
| Dominican Republic | | | 6th | | | | | | | | | | | | | 1 |
| Japan | 1st | 2nd | 2nd | 4th | 2nd | 2nd | | 1st | 4th | 2nd | 1st | 1st | 2nd | 2nd | q | 13 |
| Great Britain | | 6th | | | | 5th | | | | | | | | | | 2 |
| Italy | | | | 6th | | | | | | | | | | | | 1 |
| Mexico | | | | | | | | | 5th | 6th | 10th | 8th | — | 5th | | 6 |
| Netherlands | | | | 5th | | | 4th | | | | 9th | | | | | 3 |
| New Zealand | | | | | | | | | | | 8th | | | | | 1 |
| Peru | | | | | | | | | | | | | — | 10th | | 2 |
| Philippines | | | | | | | | | 6th | | 12th | 7th | | 9th | | 4 |
| Puerto Rico | | | | | | | 5th | 5th | | 3rd | 6th | 6th | — | 7th | | 7 |
| United States | 2nd | 1st | 1st | 1st | 1st | 1st | 1st | 2nd | 1st | 1st | 2nd | 2nd | 1st | 1st | q | 14 |
| United States; Futures/Juniors/Elite/Blue/U19 | | | | | 3rd | | | | | 5th | 4th | 5th | 3rd | 3rd | q | 6 |
| (United States) Scrap Yard Fast Pitch | | | | | | | | | | | | | — | 4th | | 2 |
| Venezuela | | | 5th | | | | | | 7th | 7th | 11th | | — | | | 5 |
| No. of teams | 5 | 6 | 6 | 6 | 4 | 6 | 6 | 5 | 7 | 8 | 13 | 8 | 13 | 10 | 8 | |
