= Women's Softball South American Championship =

- Sport: Softball
- Continent: South America
- Most recent champion: Argentina (2022)

The Women's Softball South American Championship is the main championship tournament between national women's softball teams in South America, governed by the Pan American Softball Confederation (CONPASA).

== Results ==
Year	Host	Final		Semifinalists	
Year	Host	Champions	Runners-up	3rd place	4th place
1981	(Peru); Lima	Venezuela	Peru		
1984	(Peru); Lima	Peru	Colombia		
1985	(Argentina); Buenos Aires	Argentina	Peru		
1989	(Peru); Lima	Colombia	Venezuela	Peru	Brazil
1991	(Colombia); Medellín			Peru	
1992	(Venezuela); Maracay				
2004	(Colombia); Medellín	Venezuela	Brazil	Colombia	Argentina
2011	(Colombia); Cartagena	Venezuela	Argentina	Colombia	Aruba
2014	(Colombia); Bogotá	Brazil	Colombia	Argentina	Aruba
2016	(Colombia); Cartagena	Colombia	Brazil	Argentina	Panama
2018	(Aruba); Oranjestad	Venezuela	Brazil	Argentina	Curaçao
2019	(Ecuador); Guayaquil	Curaçao	Brazil	Colombia	Argentina
2022	(Argentina); Buenos Aires	Argentina	Brazil	Curaçao	Peru
2024	(Peru); Lima	Argentina	Colombia	Brazil	Peru

=== Medal table ===
Rank	Nation	Gold	Silver	Bronze	Total
1	Argentina	3	1	3	7
2	Venezuela	3	0	0	3
3	Brazil	1	5	0	6
4	Peru	1	2	2	5
5	Colombia	1	1	3	5
6	Curaçao	1	0	1	2
Totals (6 entries)		10	9	9	28

=== Participating nations ===
Nation	(Colombia) 2004	(Colombia) 2011	(Colombia) 2014	(Colombia) 2016	(Aruba) 2018	(Ecuador) 2019	(Argentina) 2022	Years
Argentina	4th	2nd	3rd	3rd	3rd	4th	1st	7
Argentina Junior	-	-	-	-	-	-	6th	1
Aruba	-	4th	4th	-	5th	-	-	3
Brazil	2nd	5th	1st	2nd	2nd	2nd	2nd	7
Chile	-	-	-	-	-	8th	-	1
Colombia	3rd	3rd	2nd	1st	-	3rd	-	5
Colombia B	-	-	5th	-	-	-	-	1
Curaçao	-	-	-	-	4th	1st	3rd	3
Ecuador	5th	-	-	-	-	6th	-	2
Guatemala	-	6th	-	-	-	-	5th	2
Panama	-	-	-	4th	-	7th	-	2
Peru	-	7th	6th	-	6th	5th	4th	5
Venezuela	1st	1st	-	-	1st	-	-	3
Total	5	7	6	4	6	8	6	
