= 2027 Women's Softball World Cup =

Women's international softball tournament

Tournament details
- Host countries: Australia; Czech Republic; Peru; United States
- Dates: 16–20 June 2026 (Group A); 14–18 July 2026 (Group B); 12–16 September 2026 (Group C); 5–11 April 2027 (Finals)
- Teams: 18 (from 5 continents)
- Venues: 4 (in 4 host cities)
- Defending champions: Japan (2024)

The 2027 Women's Softball World Cup is the 18th edition of the Women's Softball World Cup, the quadrennial international softball championship organised under the aegis of World Baseball Softball Confederation for women's national teams across the world. It will be held in Czech Republic, Peru and United States from June and September 2026, with Australia hosting the finals from 5 to 11 April 2027. The finals will be in Redcliffe. This will be the first WBSC tournament to be held in three continents.

For the second time, 18 teams took part, following the expansion in 2024. Continental championships acted as qualification. Qualifiers took place between June and November 2025. As hosts, Australia, Czech Republic, Peru and United States automatically qualified.

This tournament will act as a qualifier, with the champions qualifying for the 2028 Summer Olympics in Los Angeles.

Japan are the defending champions, recently beating United States 6–1 at the 2024 final in Castions di Strada.

== Hosts selection ==
- On 16 April 2025, Czech Republic and Peru were the first countries to be given the hosting rights, with each country hosting a group in Prague and Lima respectively. This will be the first time both countries host the World Cup.
- On 30 April 2025, United States was given the final first round group, with Devon Park in Oklahoma City being the venue. This is the Americans' third time hosting, with the previous times being in 1974 and 2022.
- On 19 August 2025, Australia was awarded the hosting rights to the finals with the venue located in Redcliffe. This is the second time Australia will host the event after hosting the 1965 Women's Softball World Championship.
- This will be the first WBSC tournament to be held in three continents.

== Qualified teams ==
Qualification	Host	Dates	Vacancies	Qualified
Host nations	—N/a	Various	4	Australia; Czech Republic; Peru; United States
2025 Pan American Championship	(Colombia) Montería	27 June – 5 July 2025	5	Canada; Cuba; Mexico; Puerto Rico; Venezuela
2025 Asia Cup	(China) Xi'an	14–20 July 2025	3	China; Chinese Taipei; Japan
2025 European Championship	(Czech Republic) Prague	7–13 September 2025	3	Great Britain; Italy; Netherlands
2025 Africa Cup	(Kenya) Nairobi	28–29 November 2025	~~2~~ 0	~~South Africa~~; ~~Uganda~~
Oceania selection		30 November 2025	1	New Zealand
Wildcard	—N/a	—N/a	1	Brazil; Philippines
Total			18	

=== Summary of qualified teams ===
Team	Method of qualification	Date of qualification	Appearance(s)				Previous best performance (Note: Bold text indicates they hosted that edition.)	WR (Note: World rankings at the start of the tournament.)
Team	Method of qualification	Date of qualification	Total	First	Last	Streak	Previous best performance	WR
Czech Republic	Group stage hosts	16 April 2025	8th	1994	2016	1	Ninth place (2012)	TBA
Peru	Group stage hosts	16 April 2025	2nd	2016		1	21st place (2016)	TBA
United States	Group stage hosts	30 April 2025	19th	1965	2024	19	**Champions** (Twelve times) (Note: United States have won in 1974, 1986, 1990, 1994, 1998, 2002, 2006, 2010, 2016, 2018 and 2022.)	TBA
Cuba	2025 Pan American Championship	1 July 2025	7th	1990	2024	2	Ninth place (2014)	TBA
Canada	2025 Pan American Championship	2 July 2025	18th	1970	2024	18	Runners-up (1978)	TBA
Puerto Rico	2025 Pan American Championship	2 July 2025	13th	1974	2024	7	Fifth place (1986, 2018, 2022)	TBA
Mexico	2025 Pan American Championship	2 July 2025	8th	1970	2022	1	Fifth place (1970, 2016)	TBA
Venezuela	2025 Pan American Championship	3 July 2025	11th	1974	2024	2	Fifth place (**2010**)	TBA
Japan	2025 Asia Cup	18 July 2025	17th	1965	2024	14	**Champions** (1970, 2012, 2014, 2024)	TBA
China	2025 Asia Cup	19 July 2025	13th	1986	2024	2	Runners-up (1986, 1994)	TBA
Chinese Taipei	2025 Asia Cup	20 July 2025	18th	1970	2024	18	Runners-up (**1982**)	TBA
Australia	Finals hosts	19 August 2025	19th	1965	2024	19	**Champions** (**1965**)	TBA
Italy	2025 European Championship	12 September 2025	15th	1974	2024	7	Fifth place (1990)	TBA
Netherlands	2025 European Championship	12 September 2025	16th	1974	2024	2	Fourth place (2016, 2024)	TBA
Great Britain	2025 European Championship	13 September 2025	9th	1994	2024	2	Ninth place (2024)	TBA
New Zealand	Oceanian selection	30 November 2025	18th	1965	2024	2	**Champions** (1982)	TBA
Brazil	Wildcard	16 July 2026	2nd	2016		1	Eleventh place (2016)	TBA
Philippines	Wildcard	24 February 2026	9th	1970	2024	2	Third place (1970)	TBA

=== Withdrawn team ===
Team	Method of qualification	World ranking
South Africa (withdrew)	Africa Women's Softball Continental Championship winners	TBA
Uganda (withdrew)	Africa Women's Softball Continental Championship runners-up	TBA

Notes

1. Brazil replaced South Africa in July 2026, with the latter team withdrawing after the draw.
2. The Philippines was a given a wildcard following Uganda's withdrawal. Uganda was originally slotted in Group B in Lima, Peru for the Group Stages.

== Officials, Scorers, Technical Commissions and Videos ==
27 umpires, 23 scores and 7 technical commissions and 4 videos were selected by the WBSC for the tournament.

Umpires
Confederation	Umpires
WBSC Asia	Zhiling Yu (China)
WBSC Asia	Tshang-Sheng Hu (Chinese Taipei)
WBSC Asia	Ayaka Sasajima (Japan)
WBSC Americas	Analia Laura Merizzi (Argentina)
WBSC Americas	Gabriela Jimenez (Argentina)
WBSC Americas	Emma Jerome (Canada)
WBSC Americas	Laura McMilan (Canada)
WBSC Americas	Marni Caravalho (Canada)
WBSC Americas	Renzo Ruiz (Mexico)
WBSC Americas	Dwithain Brian Zambrano Gomez (Peru)
WBSC Americas	Gaby Hernández (Puerto Rico)
WBSC Americas	Jose Chaparro (Puerto Rico)
WBSC Americas	John Baca (United States)
WBSC Americas	Jon Hand (United States)
WBSC Americas	Laura Head (United States)
WBSC Americas	Naomi Erdahl (United States)
WBSC Americas	Gustavo Leonardo Castro Oviedo (Venezuela)
WBSC Europe	Vojtěch Machovský (Czech Republic)
WBSC Europe	Jan Hora (Czech Republic)
WBSC Europe	Michal Židek (Czech Republic)
WBSC Europe	Galip Sönmez (Germany)
WBSC Europe	Thomas Lohnert (Germany)
WBSC Europe	Jana McCaskill (Great Britain)
WBSC Europe	Denis Codarini (Italy)
WBSC Europe	Mariana Prins (Netherlands)
WBSC Europe	Ibon Arevalo (Spain)
WBSC Oceania	Krissi Travers (Australia)

Scorers
Confederation	Scorers
WBSC Asia	Masayoshi Sato (Japan)
WBSC Americas	Janet Wiens (Canada)
WBSC Americas	Carlos del Pino (Cuba)
WBSC Americas	Willian Cogollo (Colombia)
WBSC Americas	Gabriel Almaraz (Mexico)
WBSC Americas	Denis Benjamin Kohatsu Yamashiro (Peru)
WBSC Americas	Michelle Gushiken (Peru)
WBSC Americas	Yeini Noguera (Peru)
WBSC Americas	Carson Paige Osburne (United States)
WBSC Americas	Donald Morris (United States)
WBSC Americas	Michael Craig (United States)
WBSC Americas	Paige Bond (United States)
WBSC Europe	Alois Sečkár (Czech Republic)
WBSC Europe	Jaukb Hauser (Czech Republic)
WBSC Europe	Lenka Richterová (Czech Republic)
WBSC Europe	Michaela Jiráčkvoa (Czech Republic)
WBSC Europe	Goose Gillett (Israel)
WBSC Europe	Eva Tervisan (Italy)
WBSC Europe	Jose Petra Arends (Netherlands)
WBSC Europe	Marco Stoovelaar (Netherlands)
WBSC Europe	Stefan Slinger (Netherlands)
WBSC Europe	Elisabeth Salvador (Spain)
WBSC Europe	Luís Redín (Spain)

Technical Comissions
Confederation	Technical Commissions
WBSC Asia	Chong Fai Lee (Hong Kong, China)
WBSC Americas	Brent Chadwick (Canada)
WBSC Americas	Juan Chavez (Guatemala)
WBSC Americas	Daniela Osaki (Peru)
WBSC Americas	Rose Marie Gusukuma Kanashiro (Peru)
WBSC Americas	Greg Pohl (United States)
WBSC Oceania	Brooke Penfold (Australia)

Umpire Videos
WBSC Americas	Reinaldo Homero Lanzavecchia (Argentina)
WBSC Americas	Mike Burwell (United States)
WBSC Americas	Steven Mc Cown (United States)
WBSC Europe	Florian Kautenschlaeger (Germany)

== Venues ==
Group A	Group B
Prague, Czech Republic	Lima, Peru
Svoboda Ballpark	Villa Maria del Triunfo Complex
2027 Women's Softball World Cup is located in Czech Republic	2027 Women's Softball World Cup is located in Peru
Group C	Finals
Oklahoma City, United States	Redcliffe, Australia
Devon Park	Kayo Stadium
2027 Women's Softball World Cup is located in the United States	2027 Women's Softball World Cup is located in Australia

== Group stage ==
=== Group A ===
Group A will be contested in Prague during 16–20 June 2026.

Pos	Team	Pld	W	L	RF	RA	RD	PCT	GB	Qualification
1	Chinese Taipei	5	5	0	45	8	+37	1.000	—	Advance to Group A Final
2	Canada	5	4	1	39	22	+17	.800	1	Advance to Group A Final
3	Australia	5	3	2	23	19	+4	.600	2	Advance Group A to third place play-off
4	Italy	5	2	3	34	28	+6	.400	3	Advance Group A to third place play-off
5	Czech Republic (H)	5	1	4	13	39	−26	.200	4	
6	Cuba	5	0	5	4	42	−38	.000	5	

Source: WBSC
Rules for classification: 1) Wins/losses; 2) Head to head; 3) Head to head runs against; 4) Runs against; 5) Head to head
(H) Hosts

All times listed are local, CEST (UTC+2).

Date	Local time	Road team	Score	Home team	Inn.	Venue	Game duration	Attendance	Boxscore
16 June 2026	12:00	Italy	10–11	Canada	8	Svoboda Ballpark	3:04	227	Boxscore
16 June 2026	19:00	Czech Republic	1–7	Australia	7	Svoboda Ballpark	2:20	346	Boxscore
16 June 2026	21:30	Cuba	3–12	Chinese Taipei	5	Svoboda Ballpark	2:11	105	Boxscore
17 June 2026	10:00	Cuba	0–8	Czech Republic	5	Svoboda Ballpark	1:30	635	Boxscore
17 June 2026	13:00	Chinese Taipei	9–0	Italy	6	Svoboda Ballpark	1:52	126	Boxscore
17 June 2026	16:00	Australia	1–7	Canada	7	Svoboda Ballpark	2:13	400	Boxscore
17 June 2026	19:00	Italy	10–2	Czech Republic	7	Svoboda Ballpark	2:31	753	Boxscore
18 June 2026	10:00	Cuba	0–7	Canada	5	Svoboda Ballpark	1:44	450	Boxscore
18 June 2026	13:00	Italy	4–6	Australia	7	Svoboda Ballpark	2:17	98	Boxscore
18 June 2026	16:00	Australia	5–1	Cuba	7	Svoboda Ballpark	1:52	143	Boxscore
18 June 2026	19:00	Czech Republic	1–8	Chinese Taipei	5	Svoboda Ballpark	1:45	725	Boxscore
19 June 2026	10:00	Italy	10–0	Cuba	5	Svoboda Ballpark	1:25	190	Boxscore
19 June 2026	13:00	Canada	0–10	Chinese Taipei	4	Svoboda Ballpark	1:39	170	Boxscore
19 June 2026	16:00	Chinese Taipei	6–4	Australia	7	Svoboda Ballpark	2:30	203	Boxscore
19 June 2026	19:00	Canada	14–1	Czech Republic	5	Svoboda Ballpark	2:07	768	Boxscore

==== Bracket ====
Final
20 June – Prague
Canada	8
Chinese Taipei	7
Third place play-off
20 June – Prague
Italy	6
Australia	5

Repechage
20 June – Prague
Chinese Taipei	9
Italy	8

Round	Date	Local time	Road team	Score	Home team	Inn.	Venue	Game duration	Attendance	Boxscore
5th place match	20 June 2026	9:00	Cuba	6–3	Czech Republic	7	Svoboda Ballpark	2:46	307	Boxscore
Final	20 June 2026	12:00	Canada	8–7	Chinese Taipei	9	Svoboda Ballpark	2:47	299	Boxscore
3rd place match	20 June 2026	15:00	Italy	6–5	Australia	8	Svoboda Ballpark	2:42	299	Boxscore
Repechage	20 June 2026	18:00	Italy	8–9	Chinese Taipei	7	Svoboda Ballpark	2:42	243	Boxscore

=== Group B ===
Group B will be contested in Lima during 14–18 July 2026.

Pos	Team	Pld	W	L	RF	RA	RD	PCT	GB	Qualification
1	Japan	5	5	0	34	3	+31	1.000	—	Advance to Group B Final
2	Puerto Rico	5	3	2	20	10	+10	.600	2	Advance to Group B Final
3	Venezuela	5	3	2	43	12	+31	.600	2	Advance to Group B third place play-off
4	Great Britain	5	2	3	4	34	−30	.400	3	Advance to Group B third place play-off
5	Philippines	5	2	3	17	21	−4	.400	3	
6	Peru (H)	5	0	5	0	38	−38	.000	5	

Source: WBSC
Rules for classification: 1) Wins/losses; 2) Head to head; 3) Head to head runs against; 4) Runs against; 5) Head to head
(H) Hosts

All times listed are local, (PET) UTC−5.

Date	Local time	Road team	Score	Home team	Inn.	Venue	Game duration	Attendance	Boxscore
14 July 2026	11:00	Venezuela	8–5	Philippines	7	Villa Maria del Triunfo Complex	2:10	294	Boxscore
14 July 2026	15:00	Peru	0–4	Puerto Rico	7	Villa Maria del Triunfo Complex	1:41	310	Boxscore
14 July 2026	18:00	Japan	9–1	Great Britain	6	Villa Maria del Triunfo Complex	2:12	125	Boxscore
15 July 2026	11:00	Puerto Rico	7–4	Venezuela	7	Villa Maria del Triunfo Complex	2:07	85	Boxscore
15 July 2026	14:00	Peru	0–7	Great Britain	5	Villa Maria del Triunfo Complex	1:29	100	Boxscore
15 July 2026	17:00	Philippines	0–4	Japan	7	Villa Maria del Triunfo Complex	1:45	110	Boxscore
15 July 2026	20:00	Peru	0–9	Japan	5	Villa Maria del Triunfo Complex	1:22	250	Boxscore
16 July 2026	11:00	Puerto Rico	4–5	Philippines	7	Villa Maria del Triunfo Complex	1:48	45	Boxscore
16 July 2026	14:00	Philippines	0–5	Great Britain	7	Villa Maria del Triunfo Complex	1:52	72	Boxscore
16 July 2026	17:00	Venezuela	0–8	Japan	5	Villa Maria del Triunfo Complex			Boxscore
16 July 2026	20:00	Venezuela	10–0	Peru	5	Villa Maria del Triunfo Complex	1:37	352	Boxscore
17 July 2026	11:00	Great Britain	0–3	Puerto Rico	7	Villa Maria del Triunfo Complex	2:04	62	Boxscore
17 July 2026	14:00	Great Britain	3–10	Venezuela	6	Villa Maria del Triunfo Complex	2:04	120	Boxscore
17 July 2026	17:00	Japan	4–2	Puerto Rico	8	Villa Maria del Triunfo Complex	2:15	180	Boxscore
17 July 2026	17:00	Philippines	8–0	Peru	5	Villa Maria del Triunfo Complex	1:37	325	Boxscore

==== Bracket ====
Final
18 July – Lima
Puerto Rico	1
Japan	2
Third place play-off
18 July – Lima
Great Britain	3
Venezuela	7

Repechage
18 July – Lima
Venezuela	1
Puerto Rico	8

Round	Date	Local time	Road team	Score	Home team	Inn.	Venue	Game duration	Attendance	Boxscore
5th place match	18 July 2026	10:00	Peru	0–13	Philippines	4	Villa Maria del Triunfo Complex	1:13	155	Boxscore
Final	18 July 2023	13:00	Puerto Rico	1–2	Japan	7	Villa Maria del Triunfo Complex	1:34	254	Boxscore
3rd place match	18 July 2026	16:00	Great Britain	3–7	Venezuela	7	Villa Maria del Triunfo Complex	1:48	350	Boxscore
Repechage	18 July 2026	19:00	Venezuela	1–8	Puerto Rico	5	Villa Maria del Triunfo Complex	1:25	489	Boxscore

=== Group C ===
Group C will be contested in Oklahoma City during 12–16 September 2026.

Brazil replaced South Africa which was originally drawn in Group C.

Pos	Team	Pld	W	L	RF	RA	RD	PCT	GB	Qualification
1	United States (H)	5	5	0	52	0	+52	1.000	—	Advance to Group C Final
2	China	5	4	1	22	7	+15	.800	1	Advance to Group C Final
3	Netherlands	5	3	2	9	27	−18	.600	2	Advance to Group C third place play-off
4	Mexico	5	2	3	6	34	−28	.400	3	Advance to Group C third place play-off
5	New Zealand	5	1	4	16	75	−59	.200	4	
6	Brazil	5	0	5	3	41	−38	.000	5	

Source: WBSC
Rules for classification: 1) Wins/losses; 2) Head to head; 3) Head to head runs against; 4) Runs against; 5) Head to head
(H) Hosts

All times listed are local, (CST) UTC−5.

Date	Local time	Road team	Score	Home team	Inn.	Venue	Game duration	Attendance	Boxscore
12 September 2026	13:00	Brazil	0–9	China	5	Devon Park	1:31	197	Boxscore
12 September 2026	16:00	New Zealand	6–8	Netherlands	7	Devon Park	2:03	425	Boxscore
12 September 2026	19:00	Mexico	0–11	United States	4	Devon Park	1:23	563	Boxscore
13 September 2026	10:00	China	6–3	New Zealand	7	Devon Park	1:23	563	Boxscore
13 September 2026	13:00	United States	17–0	Brazil	4	Devon Park	2:11	180	Boxscore
13 September 2026	16:00	Mexico	0–2	Netherlands	7	Devon Park	1:34	399	Boxscore
13 September 2026	19:00	Netherlands	0–8	United States	5	Devon Park	1:45	350	Boxscore
14 September 2026	10:00	Brazil	2–9	Mexico	6	Devon Park	1:56	123	Boxscore
14 September 2026	13:00	Netherlands	2–3	China	8	Devon Park	2:28	185	Boxscore
14 September 2026	16:00	New Zealand	3–10	Mexico	6	Devon Park	2:13	230	Boxscore
14 September 2026	19:00	United States	9–0	New Zealand	5	Devon Park	1:27	275	Boxscore
15 September 2026	10:00	Brazil	1–6	Netherlands	7	Devon Park		101	Boxscore
15 September 2026	13:00	Mexico	1–2	China	7	Devon Park	2:03	161	Boxscore
15 September 2026	16:00	New Zealand	17–2	Brazil	4	Devon Park	1:28	150	Boxscore
15 September 2026	19:00	China	0–7	United States	6	Devon Park	1:43	356	Boxscore

==== Bracket ====
Final
16 September – Oklahoma City
China	0
United States	7
Third place play-off
16 September – Oklahoma City
Mexico	7
Netherlands	0

Repechage
16 September – Oklahoma City
Mexico	8
China	6

Round	Date	Local time	Road team	Score	Home team	Inn.	Venue	Game duration	Attendance	Boxscore
5th place match	16 September 2026	10:00	Brazil	0–7	New Zealand	6	Devon Park	1:48	298	Boxscore
Final	16 September 2026	13:00	China	0–7	United States	6	Devon Park	1:49	498	Boxscore
3rd place match	16 September 2026	16:00	Mexico	7–0	Netherlands	5	Devon Park	1:19	200	Boxscore
Repechage	16 September 2026	19:00	Mexico	8–6	China	7	Devon Park	2:31	149	Boxscore

== Finals ==
The top 2 teams from each of the groups A, B, and C, in addition to two wild card teams, will advance to the finals. The finals will be hosted in Redcliffe, Queensland, Australia, on 5 to 11 April 2027. Games will be played at Talobilla Park.
