= Softball at the 2022 Bolivarian Games =

Football competitions at the 2022 Bolivarian Games

- Softball pictogram
- Venue: Estadio Dorismel Pacheco Fontalvo
- Location: Valledupar, Colombia
- Dates: 25–30 June 2022
- Competitors: 105 from 7 nations
- Teams: 7

Softball competition at the 2022 Bolivarian Games in Valledupar, Colombia were held from 25 to 30 June 2022 at the Estadio Dorismel Pacheco Fontalvo.

The women's tournament was the only event scheduled to be contested. A total of 105 athletes (15 per team) competed in the event. The tournament was an open competition without age restrictions.

Venezuela were the women's softbol competition defending champions having won it in the previous edition in Santa Marta 2017, but they were unable to retain their title after finishing fourth. Dominican Republic won the gold medal by beating Colombia 12–3 in the final. Peru took third place to win the bronze medal.

== Participating nations ==
A total of 7 nations (5 ODEBO nations and 2 invited) registered teams for the softbol event.

- Colombia (15 athletes)
- Dominican Republic (15)
- Guatemala (15)
- Panama (15)
- Paraguay (15)
- Peru (15)
- Venezuela (15)

== Venue ==
All matches will be played at Estadio Dorismel Pacheco Fontalvo located within the Centro de Alto Rendimiento Deportivo La Gota Fría in Valledupar, The Estadio Dorismel Pacheco Fontalvo has a capacity for 1,600 spectators.

== Medal summary ==
=== Medal table ===
* Host nation (Host nation)

Rank	Nation	Gold	Silver	Bronze	Total
1	Dominican Republic	1	0	0	1
2	Colombia*	0	1	0	1
3	Peru	0	0	1	1
Totals (3 entries)		1	1	1	3

=== Medalists ===
Event	Gold	Silver	Bronze
Women's tournament	Dominican Republic (DOM); Daniela Bautista; Geraldina Féliz; Samanda Fígaro; Anyela Gómez; Yanela Gómez; Rosa Luis Pérez; Cauris Rincón; Jessica Rivera; Eduarda Rocha; Clari Saldaña; Claudia Santana; Yasmel Vargas; Alondra Vásquez; Anabel Ulloa; Melody Vizcaino	Colombia (COL); Natalia Álvares; Olivia Álvarez; María Avendaño; Yina Ballesta; Mayra Espitaleta; Kerlyn Guzmán; Leny Hoyos; Danisha Livingston; Solibeth Núñez; Chelsa Mclean; Darlys Pérez; Amanda Polo; Sofía Reyes; Katherine Rodríguez; Sugey Solano	Peru (PER); Selena Aponte; Brunella Beteta; Mariafe Bouchon; Akemy Gonzáles; Kiana Kadena; Jimena Kunigami; Alessandra La Puente; Allison Morales; María Pizarro; Itati Susano; Frances Tenya; Alessandra Teruya; Thais Uyema; Giovannah Webb; Adriana Yamakawa

== Women's tournament ==
2022 Bolivarian Games Women's Softball tournament
Tournament details
- Host country: Colombia
- Dates: 25–30 June 2022
- Teams: 7 (from 1 continent)
- Venue: 1 (in 1 host city)
- Defending champions: Venezuela (2016)

Final positions
- Champions: Dominican Republic
- Runner-up: Colombia
- Third place: Peru
- Fourth place: Venezuela

Tournament statistics
- Games played: 25

The tournament consisted of a preliminary round (or group stage) and a final round.

All match times are in COT (UTC−5).

=== Preliminary round ===
The preliminary round consisted of a single group of 7 teams in which each team will play once against the other 6 teams in the group on a round-robin format, with the top four teams advancing to the semi-finals play-offs in the final round.

Pos	Team	Pld	W	L	RF	RA	RD	PCT	GB	Qualification
1	Peru	6	6	0	35	9	+26	1.000	—	Semi-finals
2	Colombia (H)	6	5	1	43	11	+32	.833	1	Semi-finals
3	Venezuela	6	4	2	30	18	+12	.667	2	Semi-finals
4	Dominican Republic	6	3	3	39	20	+19	.500	3	Semi-finals
5	Guatemala	6	2	4	28	34	−6	.333	4	
6	Panama	6	1	5	37	47	−10	.167	5	
7	Bolivia	6	0	6	2	75	−73	.000	6	

Source: Bolivarianos Valledupar 2022
(H) Hosts

=== Final round ===
The final round was played under the page playoff system in which the top two teams from the preliminary round played a semi-final game, with the winners advancing directly to the gold medal game. The third and fourth placed teams from the preliminary round played another semi-final game with the winners advancing to the bronze medal game against the losers of the first semi-final. The losers of the bronze medal game kept the bronze medal while the winners advanced to the gold medal game against the winners of the first semi-final.

Semi-finals
1	Peru	5
2	Colombia	8
3	Venezuela	0
4	Dominican Republic	7

Bronze medal game
1	Peru	5
4	Dominican Republic	9

Gold medal game
2	Colombia	3
4	Dominican Republic	12

==== Semi-finals ====
P22: 29 June 15:30 at Estadio Dorismel Pacheco Fontalvo, Valledupar
Team	1	2	3	4	5	6	7	R	H	E
Dominican Republic	4	0	1	0	0	0	2	7	6	2
Venezuela	0	0	0	0	0	0	0	0	4	0
WP: Cauris Rincón LP: Mary Torres; Home runs: DOM: Geraldina Feliz; VEN: None; Boxscore

P23: 29 June 18:00 at Estadio Dorismel Pacheco Fontalvo, Valledupar
Team	1	2	3	4	5	6	7	8	R	H	E
Colombia	1	1	2	1	0	0	0	3	8	13	2
Peru	0	0	0	0	3	0	2	0	5	4	1
WP: Darlys Pérez LP: María Pizarro; Home runs: COL: María Fori; PER: None; Boxscore

==== Bronze medal game ====
P24: 30 June 15:30 at Estadio Dorismel Pacheco Fontalvo, Valledupar
Team	1	2	3	4	5	6	7	8	9	R	H	E
Dominican Republic	0	1	0	1	0	0	1	2	4	9	12	2
Peru	0	1	0	1	0	0	1	2	0	5	6	1
WP: Cauris Rincón LP: Selena Aponte; Home runs: DOM: Clary Saldaña (1), Geraldina Feliz (1), Eduarda Rocha (2); PER: None; Boxscore

==== Gold medal game ====
P25: 30 June 19:30 at Estadio Dorismel Pacheco Fontalvo, Valledupar
Team	1	2	3	4	5	6	R	H	E
Dominican Republic	0	0	2	1	2	7	12	13	3
Colombia	0	0	0	0	0	3	3	5	2
WP: Eduarda Rocha LP: Darlys Pérez; Home runs: DOM: Clary Saldaña (1); COL: None; Boxscore
