= 2018 USA Softball International Cup =

Tournament details
- Host country: United States
- Dates: July 9–15, 2018
- Teams: 11 (from 3 continents)
- Defending champions: United States (2017)

Final positions
- Champions: United States Red (10th title)
- Runner-up: Japan
- Third place: United States Blue
- Fourth place: China

The 2018 USA Softball International Cup is the first edition of the USA Softball International Cup, which is a rebranding of the World Cup of Softball.

The main team of the United States defeated Japan in the final.

== Participating teams ==
Eleven teams from nine countries participated in the tournament. The United States entered two teams; USA Red or the main team taking part at the 2018 Women's Softball World Championship and USA Blue, its secondary team. Texas-based Scrap Yard Fast Pitch also took part in the tournament.

Americas	Asia	Europe
United States Red; United States Blue; Scrap Yard Fast Pitch; Canada; Colombia; Puerto Rico; Peru; Venezuela	Japan; China	Czech Republic

== Results ==
Bronze Medal Game

July 15, 2018	China	6–7 (8)	United States Blue
July 15, 2018		Boxscore

Gold Medal Game

July 15, 2018	United States Red	10–5	Japan
July 15, 2018		Boxscore
