= 2025 U-15 Pan American Women's Softball Championship =

Women's softball tournament

Tournament details
- Host country: Mexico
- Dates: 22 March–29 March 2025
- Teams: 10

Final positions
- Champions: United States (2nd title)
- Runner-up: Mexico
- Third place: Puerto Rico
- Fourth place: Canada

The 2025 U-15 Pan American Women's Softball Championship was an international softball tournament which featured ten nations and was held from 22 March–29 March 2025 in Acapulco, Mexico.

== Preliminary round ==
=== Group A ===
Teams	W	L	Pct.
United States	4	0	1.000
Brazil	3	1	.750
Venezuela	2	2	.500
Guatemala	1	3	.250
Argentina	0	4	.000

=== Group B ===
Teams	W	L	Pct.
Mexico	4	0	1.000
Puerto Rico	3	1	.750
Canada	2	2	.500
Peru	1	3	.250
Colombia	0	4	.000

== Super round ==
Team	Score	Team
Puerto Rico	5–0	Brazil
Venezuela	0–7	Canada
Mexico	0–7	United States
Canada	8–5	Brazil
Puerto Rico	2–3	United States
Venezuela	0–7	Mexico
Venezuela	0–7	Puerto Rico
Canada	0–17	United States
Brazil	3–9	Mexico

== Third place game ==
Team	1	2	3	4	5	6	7	R	H	E
Canada	0	0	0	0	0	0	0	0	5	0
Puerto Rico	3	0	0	1	0	0	X	4	5	0
Boxscore

== Final ==
Team	1	2	3	4	5	6	7	R	H	E
Mexico	0	0	0	0	0	0	0	0	4	0
United States	2	0	2	0	1	0	X	5	11	1
Boxscore

== Final standings ==
Rank	Team
1st place, gold medalist(s)	United States
2nd place, silver medalist(s)	Mexico
3rd place, bronze medalist(s)	Puerto Rico
4th	Canada
5th	Brazil
6th	Venezuela
7th	Peru
8th	Colombia
9th	Guatemala
10th	Argentina
