= 2019 USA Softball International Cup =

Tournament details
- Host country: United States
- Dates: July 1–30, 2019
- Defending champions: United States (2018)

Final positions
- Champions: United States (11th title)
- Runner-up: Japan
- Third place: United States U19
- Fourth place: (United States) Scrap Yard Fast Pitch

The 2019 USA Softball International Cup is an international women's softball tournament. This edition of the USA Softball International Cup was held from July 1 to 7 in Columbus, Georgia.

== Participating teams ==
Ten teams from eight countries participated in the tournament.

Americas	Asia
United States (1); Puerto Rico (4); Mexico (5); Peru (20); United States U19 (N/A); Scrap Yard Fast Pitch (N/A)	Japan (2); Chinese Taipei (6); China (8); Philippines (13)

== Round robin ==
Pos	Team	Pld	W	L	PCT	GB	Qualification
1	United States	9	8	1	.889	—	Qualification to Gold medal game
2	Japan	9	8	1	.889	—	Qualification to Gold medal game
3	United States U19	9	6	3	.667	2	Advance to Bronze medal game
4	(United States) Scrap Yard Fast Pitch	9	5	4	.556	3	Advance to Bronze medal game
5	Mexico	9	5	4	.556	3	
6	China	9	4	5	.444	4	
7	Puerto Rico	9	4	5	.444	4	
8	Chinese Taipei	9	4	5	.444	4	
9	Philippines	9	1	8	.111	7	
10	Peru	9	0	9	.000	8	

Source: USA Softball

Date	Home	Score	Away
July 1	Japan	3–0	China
July 1	United States U19	9–0 (5)	Peru
July 1	China	9–6	Philippines
July 1	United States U19	7–1	Chinese Taipei
July 1	Peru	0–15 (5)	Puerto Rico
July 1	United States	8–0 (6)	Philippines
July 1	Chinese Taipei	1–5	Puerto Rico
July 1	United States	7–0	(United States) Scrap Yard Fast Pitch
July 2	Japan	4–0	Puerto Rico
July 2	United States U19	7–0 (5)	Philippines
July 2	Chinese Taipei	0–10 (5)	Japan
July 2	United States U19	7–0 (5)	China
July 2	Chinese Taipei	3–2	(United States) Scrap Yard Fast Pitch
July 2	United States	1–0	China
July 2	Mexico	9–5	(United States) Scrap Yard Fast Pitch
July 2	United States	10–0 (4)	Peru
July 3	Puerto Rico	0–3	China
July 3	Peru	0–16 (3)	Japan
July 3	United States U19	0–6	Mexico
July 3	Peru	0–10 (4)	Chinese Taipei
July 3	United States U19	1–5 (10)	United States
July 3	Philippines	1–3	(United States) Scrap Yard Fast Pitch
July 3	Philippines	2–3	Mexico
July 4	Mexico	0–2	Japan
July 4	United States U19	2–1	(United States) Scrap Yard Fast Pitch
July 4	Japan	12–2 (4)	Philippines
July 4	Puerto Rico	2–1 (8)	Philippines
July 4	Puerto Rico	3–9	(United States) Scrap Yard Fast Pitch
July 4	United States	1–0	Chinese Taipei
July 4	Peru	1–4	China
July 4	Mexico	5–7	Chinese Taipei
July 5	United States U19	0–10 (4)	Japan
July 5	Peru	0–16 (4)	(United States) Scrap Yard Fast Pitch
July 5	Chinese Taipei	5–1	Philippines
July 5	China	1–10 (6)	(United States) Scrap Yard Fast Pitch
July 5	Mexico	9–0	China
July 5	United States	2–3	Japan
July 5	Mexico	1–2	Puerto Rico
July 6	Chinese Taipei	2–4	China
July 6	United States	7–0 (4)	Mexico
July 6	Peru	1–2	Philippines
July 6	Mexico	4–2	Peru
July 6	United States	7–0 (5)	Puerto Rico
July 6	Japan	0–7 (5)	(United States) Scrap Yard Fast Pitch
July 6	United States U19	3–0	Puerto Rico

== Placement games ==
=== Bronze medal game ===
July 7, 2019	United States U19	8–0 (5)	(United States) Scrap Yard Fast Pitch

=== Gold medal game ===
July 7, 2019	United States	2–1	Japan

== Exhibition games ==
Date	Home	Score	Away
July 5	United States	2–1	(United States) USSSA Pride
July 6	Japan	3–2	(United States) USSSA Pride
July 6	United States U19	3–3 (5)	(United States) USSSA Pride

== Final standings ==
Rank	Team
1st place, gold medalist(s)	United States
2nd place, silver medalist(s)	Japan
3rd place, bronze medalist(s)	United States U19
4	(United States) Scrap Yard Fast Pitch
5	Mexico
6	China
7	Puerto Rico
8	Chinese Taipei
9	Philippines
10	Peru
