= 2023 U-15 Women's Softball World Cup =

Tournament details
- Host country: Japan
- Dates: October 21 – 29, 2023
- Teams: 12 (from 5 continents)

Final positions
- Champions: United States (1st title)
- Runner-up: Puerto Rico
- Third place: Japan
- Fourth place: Chinese Taipei

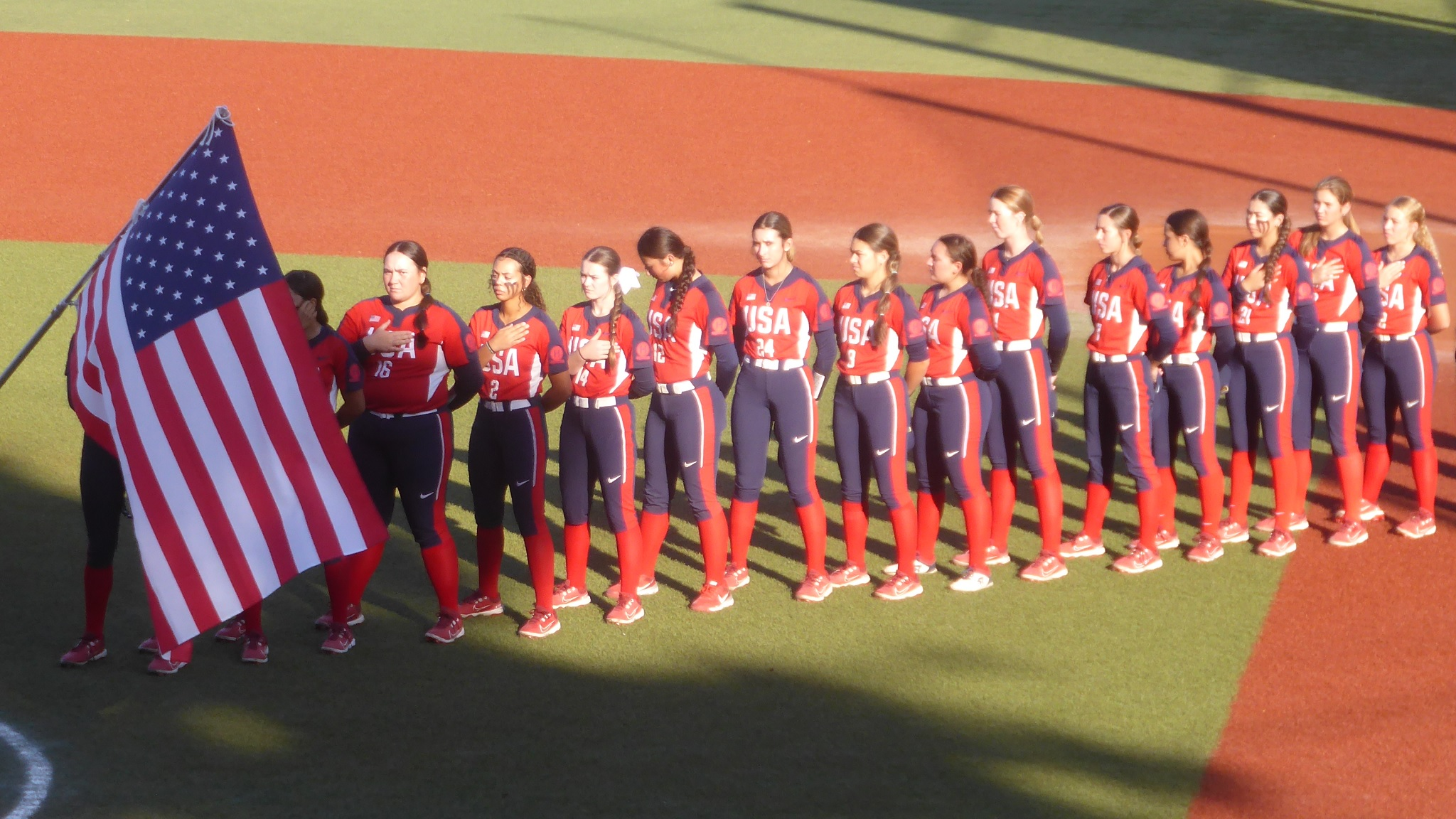
Team USA, the World Cup winner

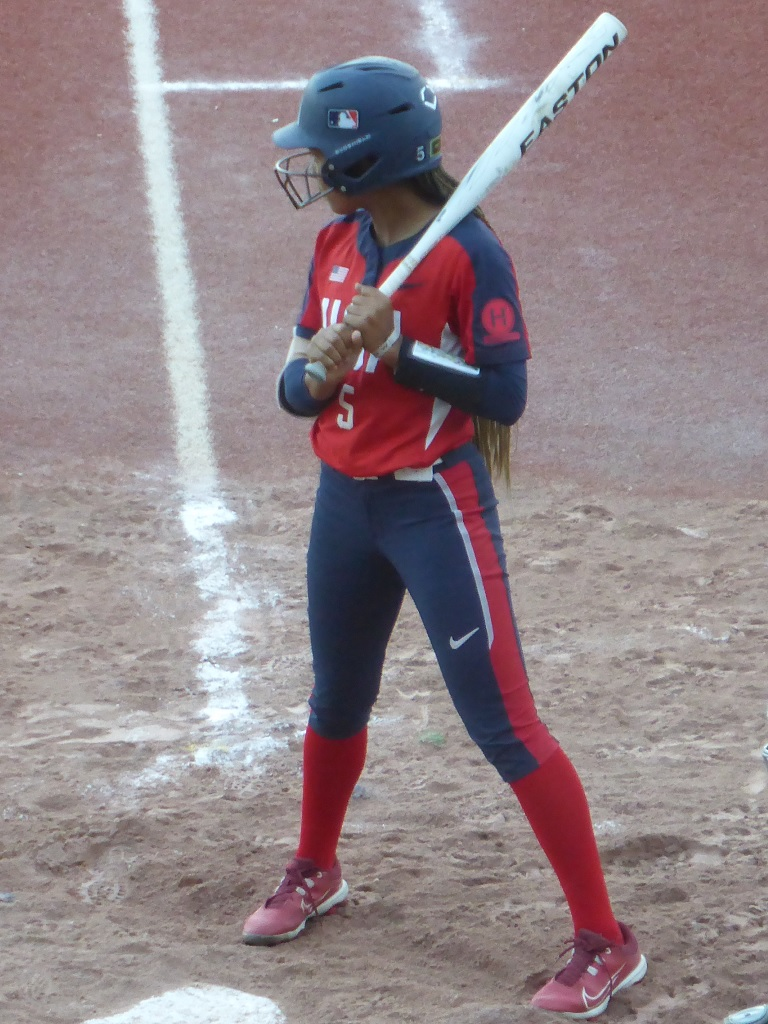
Aspen Boulware, the MVP

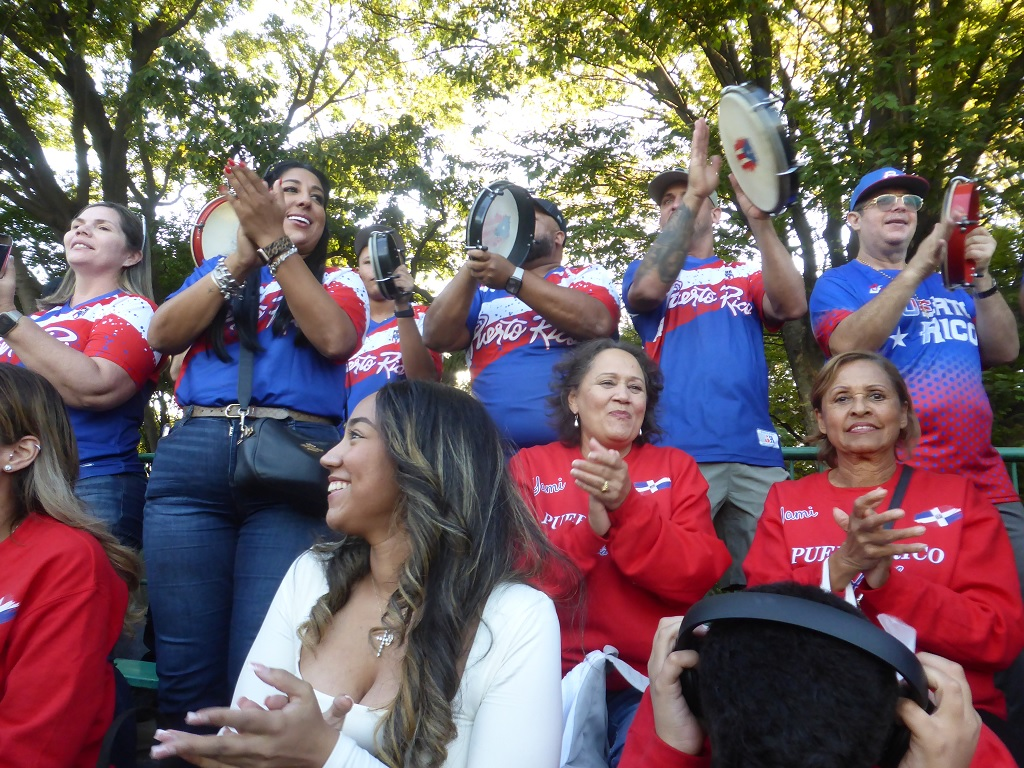
Puerto Rican softball fans

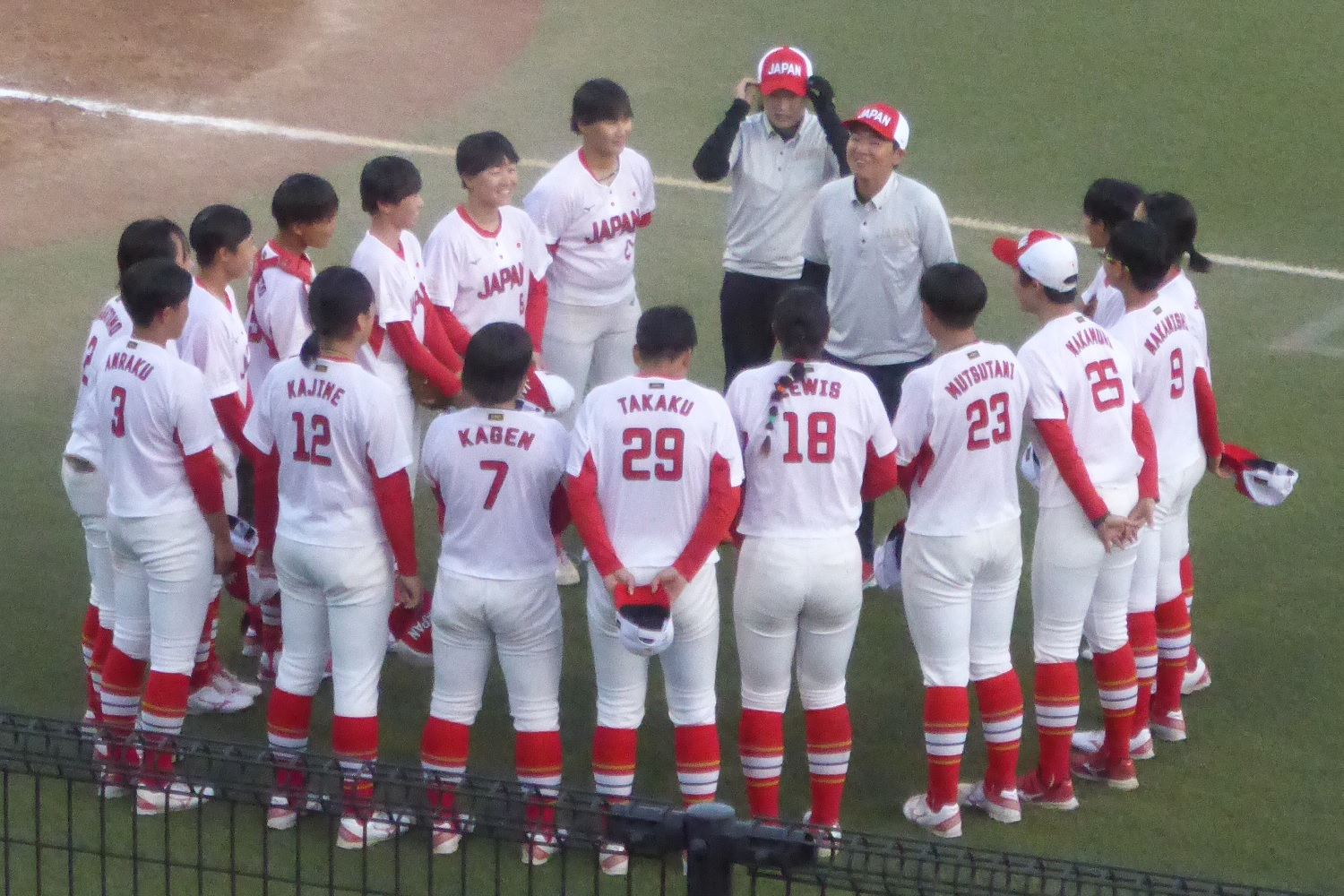
Team Japan, the host country

The 2023 U-15 Women's Softball World Cup was the first edition of the U-15 Women's Softball World Cup held in Tokyo, Japan, from October 21 to 29, and featured 12 national teams from five continents. (Note: Since Uganda bowed out, 11 countries from four continents actually participated.) It was the first world junior softball championship played in Japan, after three Women's Softball World Cups were organized in 1970 in Osaka, 1998 in Fujinomiya and 2018 in Chiba.

The United States prevailed 3–0 in the unprecedented showdown with Puerto Rico in the final of the inaugural U-15 Women's Softball World Cup at Ota Stadium in Tokyo. The United States now holds all of the women's softball World Cup titles, namely the WBSC U-15, U-18 and Senior crowns. Earlier in the day, Japan beat Chinese Taipei to claim the bronze medal.

Aspen Boulware of the United States, was named the Most Valuable Player at the 2023 U-15 Women's Softball World Cup, where she was also included as part of the World Team's outstanding outfield.

== Venue selection ==
The presentation of the new tournament occurred on February 26, 2021, when the WBSC announced its Schedule for the Softball World Cups for the next nine years in the 2021-2029 competition period.

On June 9, 2022, the World Baseball Softball Confederation awarded hosting rights for the inaugural U-15 Women's Softball World Cup to the Japan Softball Association (JSA) following its executive board meeting. The first edition of the new World Cup would be played in Tokyo in October 2023 with the best players in the world from 12 countries. The JSA candidacy won the race against Lima, Peru.

The naming of Tokyo as the host of the WBSC U-15 Women's Softball World Cup, a youth-focused event, two years after the successful softball competition at the 2020 Summer Olympics, adds to the legacy of the Tokyo Games, which saw Japan claim the gold medal beating the United States in the final.

On July 1, 2022, the organizers announced that the tournament will be played at the Komazawa Olympic Park Sports Complex, a legacy of the 1964 Summer Olympics. The Komazawa Olympic Park facilities were used as venues for ice hockey, grass, wrestling, volleyball, soccer and other events. Baseball and cycling facilities were added after the Games when the park was transformed into a public sports center for the citizens of Tokyo.

The JSA also announced that two additional venues will be used during the tournament: the Setagaya City Okura Sports Center Baseball Field will host some Preliminary Round games, while Ota Stadium will host the Super Round games and the finals, with 3,223 capacities.

Tokyo, Japan
Opening Round & Qualification Round	Opening Round	Super Round & Finals
(Japan) Setagaya, Tokyo	(Japan) Setagaya, Tokyo	(Japan) Ota, Tokyo
Komazawa Olympic Park	Okura Sports Center Baseball Field	Ota Stadium
Capacity: 3,000	Capacity: –	Capacity: 3,223
Local team: –	Local team: –	Local team: –

== Referees ==
Referees Director: (Australia) William Leigh Evans
Referees Director Assistant (Philippines) Paulo Tabirara
Referees:

- (South Korea) Jo Boyeon
- (Japan) Sasajima Ayaka
- (Germany) Megan Hylton
- (Chinese Taipei) ReneHu Tsang-Sheng
- (Japan) Yabe Miki
- (Australia) Derrin Clark
- (Puerto Rico) William Osbel López Pellot
- (Japan) Tanaka Katsuhiro
- (New Zealand) Brydon Lloyd Wells
- (China) Cheng Tao
- (Japan) Hashimoto Takashi
- (Malaysia) Ismail Rosli Bin
- (Mexico) Eliazim Raúl Salazar Leal
- (Japan) Ogawa Koji

== Competition format ==
The 12 participating nations will open the tournament divided into two groups of six teams. The top three in each group will advance to the Super Round, and the top two from this stage will advance to the Championship Final. All six teams will enter the Super Round maintaining their respective Opening Round head-to-head records.

The group stage will feature 25 matches to be played in Komazawa and Setagaya from October 21 to 24. The top three teams in each group will advance to the Super Round, while the other five teams will play in the Placement Round. In this phase there will be 15 matches in Komazawa and Ota Stadium from October 26 to 28. The bronze medal match and the world championship final will be played at Ota Stadium on October 29.

== Preliminary round ==
=== Group A ===
Teams	W	L	Pct.
Japan	5	0	1.000
Chinese Taipei	4	1	.800
Mexico	3	2	.600
Italy	2	3	.400
Peru	1	4	.200
New Zealand	0	5	.000

=== Group B ===
Teams	W	L	Pct.
United States	5	0	1.000
Puerto Rico	4	1	.800
Philippines	2	3	.400
Czech Republic	2	3	.400
Brazil	2	3	.400
Uganda	0	5	.000

== Super round ==
Team	Score	Team
Chinese Taipei	1–2	Puerto Rico
Philippines	0–7	Japan
Mexico	1–5	United States
Mexico	0–1	Puerto Rico
Japan	2–1	United States
Philippines	2–9	Chinese Taipei
Mexico	12–3	Philippines
Puerto Rico	3–2	Japan
Chinese Taipei	0–10	United States

== Third place game ==
Team	1	2	3	4	5	6	7	R	H	E
Chinese Taipei	0	0	0	0	0	0	0	0	3	2
Japan	0	0	0	1	0	1	X	2	5	0
Boxscore

== Final ==
Team	1	2	3	4	5	6	7	R	H	E
Puerto Rico	0	0	0	0	0	0	0	0	1	2
United States	2	0	0	0	0	1	X	3	6	0
Boxscore

== Final standings ==
Rank	Team
1st place, gold medalist(s)	United States
2nd place, silver medalist(s)	Puerto Rico
3rd place, bronze medalist(s)	Japan
4th	Chinese Taipei
5th	Mexico
6th	Philippines
7th	Czech Republic
8th	Italy
9th	Peru
10th	Brazil
11th	New Zealand
12th	Uganda
