= 2025 U-15 Women's Softball World Cup =

Under 15 girl's softball competition in Italy

Tournament details
- Host country: Italy
- Dates: 27 June – 5 July 2025
- Teams: 12
- Venues: 2 (in 2 host cities)
- Defending champions: United States

Final positions
- Champions: Japan (1st title)
- Runner-up: Puerto Rico
- Third place: United States
- Fourth place: Mexico

The 2025 U-15 Women's Softball World Cup was the second edition of the U-15 Women's Softball World Cup held in Caronno Pertusella and Legnano, Italy, from June 27 to July 5, and feature 12 national teams from five continents.

Japan defeated Puerto Rico 4-0 to win the championship. The United States defeated Mexico to win the bronze medal.

== Venues ==
The tournament held at Centro Sportivo Peppino Colombo and Campo Softball Francesco Nespoli.

== Qualification ==
Event	Dates	Location(s)	Berth(s)	Qualified
2024 U-15 European Championship	1–6 July 2024	(Czech Republic) Prague	3	Czech Republic; Italy; Spain
Oceanian selection	—N/a	—N/a	2	Australia; American Samoa
2025 U-15 Pan American Championship	22–29 March 2025	(Mexico) Acapulco de Juárez	4	United States; Mexico; Puerto Rico; Canada
2025 U-15 Asia Cup	26–30 March 2025	(Taiwan) Puli	~~2~~ 3	Japan; Chinese Taipei; Singapore
African qualifier	—N/a	—N/a	~~1~~ 0	
Total			12	

== First round ==
=== Group A ===
Pos	Team	Pld	W	L	RF	RA	PCT	GB	Qualification
1	Japan	5	5	0	32	6	1.000	—	Advance to super round
2	Puerto Rico	5	4	1	38	10	.800	1	Advance to super round
3	Mexico	5	3	2	20	19	.600	2	Advance to super round
4	Italy (H)	5	2	3	19	22	.400	3	Advance to placement round
5	Spain	5	1	4	9	44	.200	4	Advance to placement round
6	American Samoa	5	0	5	10	27	.000	5	Advance to placement round

Source: WBSC
(H) Hosts

Date	Local time	Road team	Score	Home team	Inn.	Venue	Game duration	Attendance	Boxscore
June 27, 2025	10:30	American Samoa	2–6	Japan		Campo Softball Francesco Nespoli	1:49	56	Boxscore
June 27, 2025	13:00	Mexico	3–10	Puerto Rico	F/5	Centro Sportivo Peppino Colombo	2:00	110	Boxscore
June 27, 2025	20:00	Italy	12–1	Spain	F/5	Campo Softball Francesco Nespoli	1:39	441	Boxscore
June 28, 2025	10:30	Mexico	8–2	American Samoa		Campo Softball Francesco Nespoli	1:45	50	Boxscore
June 28, 2025	13:00	Puerto Rico	0–7	Japan	F/5	Centro Sportivo Peppino Colombo	1:27	40	Boxscore
June 28, 2025	16:30	Spain	7–6	American Samoa	F/8	Campo Softball Francesco Nespoli	2:23	255	Boxscore
June 28, 2025	19:00	Italy	3–4	Japan		Centro Sportivo Peppino Colombo	1:51	249	Boxscore
June 29, 2025	10:30	Spain	0–7	Mexico	F/5	Campo Softball Francesco Nespoli	1:40	55	Boxscore
June 29, 2025	13:30	Japan	6–0	Mexico		Campo Softball Francesco Nespoli	1:48	62	Boxscore
June 29, 2025	16:30	Puerto Rico	15–0	Italy	F/4	Campo Softball Francesco Nespoli	1:54	210	Boxscore
June 29, 2025	19:30	American Samoa	0–3	Italy		Campo Softball Francesco Nespoli	1:19	326	Boxscore
June 30, 2025	10:00	Spain	0–10	Puerto Rico	F/4	Centro Sportivo Peppino Colombo	1:08	72	Boxscore
June 30, 2025	13:00	American Samoa	0–3	Puerto Rico		Centro Sportivo Peppino Colombo	1:33	70	Boxscore
June 30, 2025	16:00	Japan	9–1	Spain	F/5	Centro Sportivo Peppino Colombo	1:12	47	Boxscore
June 30, 2025	19:00	Italy	1–2	Mexico		Centro Sportivo Peppino Colombo	1:50	240	Boxscore

=== Group B ===
Pos	Team	Pld	W	L	RF	RA	PCT	GB	Qualification
1	United States	5	5	0	61	1	1.000	—	Advance to super round
2	Czech Republic	5	3	2	21	26	.600 (Note: Head-to-head result: Czech Republic 1–0 Chinese Taipei)	2	Advance to super round
3	Chinese Taipei	5	3	2	27	26	.600	2	Advance to super round
4	Canada	5	2	3	20	18	.400 (Note: Head-to-head result: Canada 7–0 Australia)	3	Advance to placement round
5	Australia	5	2	3	26	26	.400	3	Advance to placement round
6	Singapore	5	0	5	3	61	.000	5	Advance to placement round

Source: WBSC
Notes:

Date	Local time	Road team	Score	Home team	Inn.	Venue	Game duration	Attendance	Boxscore
June 27, 2025	10:00	Canada	2–3	Czech Republic		Centro Sportivo Peppino Colombo	1:43	80	Boxscore
June 27, 2025	15:00	Chinese Taipei	1–16	United States	F/3	Campo Softball Francesco Nespoli	1:25	84	Boxscore
June 27, 2025	16:00	Australia	11–0	Singapore	F/4	Centro Sportivo Peppino Colombo	1:15	70	Boxscore
June 28, 2025	10:00	Chinese Taipei	0–1	Czech Republic		Centro Sportivo Peppino Colombo	1:44	100	Boxscore
June 28, 2025	13:30	Singapore	3–8	Canada		Campo Softball Francesco Nespoli	1:45	120	Boxscore
June 28, 2025	16:00	Australia	9–4	Czech Republic		Centro Sportivo Peppino Colombo	2:20	120	Boxscore
June 28, 2025	19:30	United States	8–0	Canada	F/5	Campo Softball Francesco Nespoli	1:21	200	Boxscore
June 29, 2025	10:00	Australia	6–8	Chinese Taipei		Centro Sportivo Peppino Colombo	2:12	70	Boxscore
June 29, 2025	13:00	Canada	3–4	Chinese Taipei	F/10	Centro Sportivo Peppino Colombo	2:08	234	Boxscore
June 29, 2025	16:00	Czech Republic	0–15	United States	F/3	Centro Sportivo Peppino Colombo	1:08	80	Boxscore
June 29, 2025	19:00	Singapore	0–15	United States	F/3	Centro Sportivo Peppino Colombo	1:03	70	Boxscore
June 30, 2025	10:30	Canada	7–0	Australia	F/5	Campo Softball Francesco Nespoli	1:23	123	Boxscore
June 30, 2025	13:30	Singapore	0–14	Chinese Taipei	F/4	Campo Softball Francesco Nespoli	1:20	45	Boxscore
June 30, 2025	16:30	United States	7–0	Australia		Campo Softball Francesco Nespoli	1:57	120	Boxscore
June 30, 2025	19:30	Czech Republic	13–0	Singapore	F/5	Campo Softball Francesco Nespoli	1:35	47	Boxscore

== Super round ==
Pos	Team	Pld	W	L	RF	RA	PCT	GB	Qualification
1	Japan	5	5	0	27	2	1.000	—	Advance to final
2	Puerto Rico	5	4	1	28	13	.800	1	Advance to final
3	United States	5	3	2	40	8	.600	2	Advance to third-place game
4	Mexico	5	1	4	8	26	.200 (Note: TQB)	4	Advance to third-place game
5	Chinese Taipei	5	1	4	6	26	.200	4	
6	Czech Republic	5	1	4	2	36	.200	4	

Updated to match(es) played on unknown. Source: WBSC
Notes:

Date	Local time	Road team	Score	Home team	Inn.	Venue	Game duration	Attendance	Boxscore
July 2, 2025	14:30	Mexico	0–7	United States	F/5	Campo Softball Francesco Nespoli	1:40	213	Boxscore
July 2, 2025	15:00	Puerto Rico	10–0	Czech Republic		Centro Sportivo Peppino Colombo	2:16	53	Boxscore
July 2, 2025	18:30	Chinese Taipei	0–4	Japan		Campo Softball Francesco Nespoli	1:46	85	Boxscore
July 3, 2025	10:30	Mexico	4–1	Czech Republic		Campo Softball Francesco Nespoli	1:44	50	Boxscore
July 3, 2025	15:00	Chinese Taipei	3–4	Puerto Rico		Centro Sportivo Peppino Colombo	2:04	77	Boxscore
July 3, 2025	19:00	United States	2–3	Japan		Centro Sportivo Peppino Colombo	1:39	220	Boxscore
July 4, 2025	11:00	Mexico	1–2	Chinese Taipei		Centro Sportivo Peppino Colombo	1:41	50	Boxscore
July 4, 2025	14:30	Czech Republic	0–7	Japan	F/5	Campo Softball Francesco Nespoli	1:38	80	Boxscore
July 4, 2025	18:30	Puerto Rico	4–0	United States		Campo Softball Francesco Nespoli	1:55	200	Boxscore

== Placement round ==
Pos	Team	Pld	W	L	RF	RA	PCT	GB
1	Canada	5	5	0	37	6	1.000	—
2	Australia	5	3	2	21	22	.600 (Note: Head-to-head result: Australia 4–3 Italy)	2
3	Italy (H)	5	3	2	27	16	.600	2
4	American Samoa	5	2	3	20	23	.400	3
5	Singapore	5	1	4	18	40	.200 (Note: Head-to-head result: Singapore 8–6 Spain)	4
6	Spain	5	1	4	21	37	.200	4

Updated to match(es) played on unknown. Source: WBSC
(H) Hosts
Notes:

Date	Local time	Road team	Score	Home team	Inn.	Venue	Game duration	Attendance	Boxscore
July 2, 2025	10:30	American Samoa	8–1	Australia	F/5	Campo Softball Francesco Nespoli	1:41	65	Boxscore
July 2, 2025	11:00	Singapore	8–6	Spain		Centro Sportivo Peppino Colombo	2:20	62	Boxscore
July 2, 2025	19:00	Italy	0–9	Canada	F/5	Centro Sportivo Peppino Colombo	1:12	147	Boxscore
July 3, 2025	11:00	Spain	4–5	Australia		Centro Sportivo Peppino Colombo	2:10	75	Boxscore
July 3, 2025	14:30	American Samoa	0–7	Canada	F/6	Campo Softball Francesco Nespoli	1:38	70	Boxscore
July 3, 2025	18:30	Singapore	2–9	Italy	F/5	Campo Softball Francesco Nespoli	1:26	75	Boxscore
July 4, 2025	10:30	Spain	3–6	Canada		Campo Softball Francesco Nespoli	2:18	70	Boxscore
July 4, 2025	15:00	Singapore	5–6	American Samoa		Centro Sportivo Peppino Colombo	1:59	42	Boxscore
July 4, 2025	19:00	Australia	4–3	Italy		Centro Sportivo Peppino Colombo	2:12	140	Boxscore

== Finals ==
=== Third place game ===
Date	Local time	Road team	Score	Home team	Inn.	Venue	Game duration	Attendance	Boxscore
July 5, 2025	15:00	Mexico	0–4	United States		Campo Softball Francesco Nespoli	1:39	400	Boxscore

=== Championship ===
Date	Local time	Road team	Score	Home team	Inn.	Venue	Game duration	Attendance	Boxscore
July 5, 2025	18:00	Puerto Rico	0–4	Japan		Campo Softball Francesco Nespoli	1:49	500	Boxscore

== Final standings ==
Rk	Team	W	L
1st place, gold medalist(s)	Japan	9	0
Lost in Final
2nd place, silver medalist(s)	Puerto Rico	7	2
Won in 3rd-place game
3rd place, bronze medalist(s)	United States	7	2
Lost in 3rd-place game
4	Mexico	4	5
Failed to qualify for the finals
5	Chinese Taipei	4	4
6	Czech Republic	3	5
Failed to qualify for the super round
7	Canada	5	3
8	Australia	4	4
9	Italy	3	5
10	American Samoa	2	6
11	Singapore	1	7
12	Spain	1	7

2025 U-15 Women's Softball World Cup

Japan
1st title

== External websites ==
- Official website
