= 2016 Women's Softball World Championship =

Tournament details
- Host country: Canada
- Dates: 15 July – 24 July
- Teams: 31 (from 5 continents)
- Defending champions: Japan (2014)

Final positions
- Champions: United States (10th title)
- Runner-up: Japan
- Third place: Canada
- Fourth place: Netherlands

Tournament statistics
- Games played: 122

The 2016 Women's Softball World Championship was an international softball competition to be held in Surrey, British Columbia between July 15 and July 24, 2016. It was the 15th edition of the tournament, and the second edition to be sanctioned by the World Baseball Softball Confederation (WBSC). Previous editions were sanctioned by the International Softball Federation, which governed the sport until its 2013 merger with the International Baseball Federation to create the WBSC. It was announced on March 17, 2016, that the field for the tournament would be expanded from 16 to 31.

== Qualification ==
Origin	Berths	Qualified
Host nation	1	Canada
Oceania	2	Australia; New Zealand
Europe	11	Italy; Netherlands; Czech Republic; Austria; France; Great Britain; Greece; Ireland; Israel; Serbia; Switzerland
Americas	9	United States; Puerto Rico; Brazil; Cuba; Ecuador; Guatemala; Mexico; Peru; Venezuela
Asia	6	Japan; China; Chinese Taipei; India; Pakistan; Philippines
Africa	2	Kenya; Uganda

== Group stage ==
=== Group A ===
Teams	W	L	Pct.	GB
Japan	2	0	1.000	–
Venezuela	1	1	.500	1
France	0	2	.000	2

Date	Team 1	Score	Team 2
15 July 2016	Venezuela	7–0 (6)	France
16 July 2016	Japan	2–1	Venezuela
17 July 2016	Japan	7–0 (5)	France

=== Group B ===
Teams	W	L	Pct.	GB
United States	3	0	1.000	–
Brazil	2	1	.666	1
Austria	1	2	.333	2
Israel	0	3	.000	3

Date	Team 1	Score	Team 2
15 July 2016	Austria	0–11 (5)	Brazil
15 July 2016	United States	15–0 (3)	Israel
16 July 2016	United States	15–0 (3)	Austria
16 July 2016	Brazil	19–0 (3)	Israel
17 July 2016	United States	13–0 (4)	Brazil
17 July 2016	Austria	13–2 (4)	Israel

=== Group C ===
Teams	W	L	Pct.	GB
Mexico	3	0	1.000	–
Australia	2	1	.667	1
Switzerland	1	2	.333	2
Serbia	0	3	.000	3

Date	Team 1	Score	Team 2
15 July 2016	Switzerland	13–10	Serbia
15 July 2016	Australia	0–2 (8)	Mexico
16 July 2016	Mexico	15–0 (3)	Serbia
16 July 2016	Australia	12–0 (4)	Switzerland
17 July 2016	Australia	13–0 (4)	Serbia
17 July 2016	Mexico	13–0 (4)	Switzerland

=== Group D ===
Teams	W	L	Pct.	GB
Canada	3	0	1.000	–
Great Britain	2	1	.666	1
Uganda	1	2	.333	2
Ireland	0	3	.000	3

Date	Team 1	Score	Team 2
15 July 2016	Ireland	8–12	Uganda
15 July 2016	Canada	3–0	Great Britain
16 July 2016	Uganda	1–13 (3)	Great Britain
16 July 2016	Canada	14–0 (4)	Ireland
17 July 2016	Great Britain	15–0 (4)	Ireland
17 July 2016	Canada	10–0 (4)	Uganda

=== Group E ===
Teams	W	L	Pct.	GB
Puerto Rico	3	0	1.000	–
Chinese Taipei	2	1	.666	1
Ecuador	1	2	.333	2
India	0	3	.000	3

Date	Team 1	Score	Team 2
15 July 2016	Puerto Rico	25–0 (3)	India
15 July 2016	Chinese Taipei	11–0 (5)	Ecuador
16 July 2016	Ecuador	14–0 (4)	India
16 July 2016	Chinese Taipei	0–2	Puerto Rico
17 July 2016	Puerto Rico	7–0 (5)	Ecuador
17 July 2016	Chinese Taipei	15–0 (3)	India

=== Group F ===
Teams	W	L	Pct.	GB
Netherlands	3	0	1.000	–
Philippines	2	1	.667	1
Czech Republic	1	2	.333	2
Pakistan	0	3	.000	3

Date	Team 1	Score	Team 2
15 July 2016	Czech Republic	0–1	Philippines
15 July 2016	Netherlands	—	Pakistan (Forfeited)
16 July 2016	Pakistan (Forfeited)	—	Philippines
16 July 2016	Netherlands	2–0	Czech Republic
17 July 2016	Netherlands	7–2	Philippines
17 July 2016	Czech Republic	—	Pakistan (Forfeited)

=== Group G ===
Teams	W	L	Pct.	GB
China	3	0	1.000	–
Cuba	2	1	.667	–
Greece	1	2	.333	1.5
Guatemala	0	3	.000	2.5

Date	Team 1	Score	Team 2
15 July 2016	Cuba	8–1 (6)	Greece
15 July 2016	China	7–0 (6)	Guatemala
16 July 2016	China	5–1	Greece
16 July 2016	Cuba	1–0	Guatemala
17 July 2016	Guatemala	0–2	Greece
17 July 2016	Cuba	1–9	China

=== Group H ===
Teams	W	L	Pct.	GB
New Zealand	3	0	1.000	–
Italy	2	1	.667	1
Peru	1	2	.333	2
Kenya	0	3	.000	3

Date	Team 1	Score	Team 2
15 July 2016	Italy	5–0	Peru
15 July 2016	New Zealand	28–0 (3)	Kenya
16 July 2016	New Zealand	7–0 (5)	Peru
16 July 2016	Italy	15–0 (3)	Kenya
17 July 2016	New Zealand	8–7 (9)	Italy
17 July 2016	Kenya	3–10 (5)	Peru

== Championship round ==
=== Group 1 ===
Teams	W	L	Pct.	GB
Japan	3	0	1.000	–
New Zealand	2	1	.667	1
Chinese Taipei	1	2	.333	2
Great Britain	0	3	.000	3

=== Group 2 ===
Teams	W	L	Pct.	GB
United States	3	0	1.000	–
China	2	1	.667	1
Australia	1	2	.333	2
Philippines	0	3	.000	3

=== Group 3 ===
Teams	W	L	Pct.	GB
Mexico	3	0	1.000	–
Netherlands	2	1	.667	1
Brazil	1	2	.333	2
Cuba	0	3	.000	3

=== Group 4 ===
Teams	W	L	Pct.	GB
Venezuela	2	1	.667	–
Canada	2	1	.667	–
Puerto Rico	2	1	.667	–
Italy	0	3	.000	3

=== Day 1 ===
July 18, 2016	Puerto Rico	4–0	Italy	Softball City 1

July 18, 2016	New Zealand	6–0	Great Britain	Softball City 1

July 18, 2016	Japan	6–1	Chinese Taipei	Softball City 1

July 18, 2016	Australia	11–1 (5)	Philippines	Softball City 1

July 18, 2016	Canada	1–6	Venezuela	Softball City 1

July 18, 2016	Brazil	5–1	Cuba	Softball City 2

=== Day 2 ===
July 19, 2016	Netherlands	9–3	Brazil	Softball City 1

July 19, 2016	New Zealand	4–0	Chinese Taipei	Softball City 2

July 19, 2016	Japan	4–2	Great Britain	Softball City 1

July 19, 2016	Venezuela	5–0	Italy	Softball City 2

July 19, 2016	United States	6–1	China	Softball City 1

July 19, 2016	Mexico	1–0	Cuba	Softball City 2

=== Day 3 ===
July 20, 2016	China	7–1	Philippines	Softball City 1

July 20, 2016	Mexico	3–2	Netherlands	Softball City 1

July 20, 2016	Great Britain	1–2	Chinese Taipei	Softball City 2

July 20, 2016	Canada	10–0	Puerto Rico	Softball City 1

July 20, 2016	United States	5–3	Australia	Softball City 2

=== Day 4 ===
July 21, 2016	Netherlands	9-1 (5)	Cuba	Softball City 1

July 21, 2016	Mexico	5-3	Brazil	Softball City 2

July 21, 2016	United States	11-0 (5)	Philippines	Softball City 1

July 21, 2016	Puerto Rico	3-0	Venezuela	Softball City 2

July 21, 2016	Canada	3-1	Italy	Softball City 1

July 21, 2016	China	2-0	Australia	Softball City 3

July 21, 2016	Japan	9-2 (6)	New Zealand	Softball City 2

== Placement round ==
=== Group 1 ===
Teams	W	L	Pct.	GB
Peru	3	0	1.000	–
France	2	1	.667	1
India	1	2	.333	2
Ireland	0	3	.000	3

=== Group 2 ===
Teams	W	L	Pct.	GB
Austria	3	0	1.000	–
Greece	2	1	.667	1
Serbia	1	2	.333	2
Pakistan	0	3	.000	3

=== Group 3 ===
Teams	W	L	Pct.	GB
Czech Republic	3	0	1.000	–
Guatemala	2	1	.667	1
Israel	1	2	.333	2
Switzerland	0	3	.000	3

=== Group 4 ===
Teams	W	L	Pct.	GB
Ecuador	2	0	1.000	–
Uganda	1	1	.500	1
Kenya	0	2	.000	2

=== Day 1 ===
July 18, 2016	Switzerland	8–11	Israel	Softball City 2

July 18, 2016	Ecuador	4–2	Uganda	Softball City 2

July 18, 2016	Austria	5–4	Greece	Softball City 3

July 18, 2016	France	9–2 (6)	India	Softball City 4

=== Day 2 ===
July 19, 2016	Ecuador	15–3 (4)	Kenya	Softball City 1

July 19, 2016	Czech Republic	6–1	Guatemala	Softball City 2

July 19, 2016	Pakistan (Forfeited)	N/A	Austria	Softball City 3

July 19, 2016	Greece	9–2 (5)	Serbia	Softball City 4

July 19, 2016	Peru	11–0 (4)	India	Softball City 3

July 19, 2016	France	11–0 (4)	Ireland	Softball City 4

=== Day 3 ===
July 20, 2016	Austria	10–0 (4)	Serbia	Softball City 1

July 20, 2016	Peru	11–0 (4)	Ireland	Softball City 2

July 20, 2016	Greece	N/A	Pakistan (Forfeited)	Softball City 2

July 20, 2016	Guatemala	19–3 (4)	Israel	Softball City 3

July 20, 2016	Switzerland	1–16 (3)	Czech Republic	Softball City 4

July 20, 2016	Uganda	9–2	Kenya	Softball City 3

=== Day 4 ===
July 21, 2016	Israel	0-18 (3)	Czech Republic	Softball City 1

July 21, 2016	France	1-8 (6)	Peru	Softball City 2

July 21, 2016	Ireland	2-5	India	Softball City 4

July 21, 2016	Switzerland	0-11 (4)	Guatemala	Softball City 3

July 21, 2016	Serbia	N/A	Pakistan (Forfeited)	Softball City 4

== Championship Round-Double Page ==
=== Day 1 ===
July 22, 2016	Canada	4-3	China	Softball City 1

July 22, 2016	New Zealand	2-8	Netherlands	Softball City 1

July 22, 2016	Japan	2-0	Mexico	Softball City 1

July 22, 2016	United States	7-0 (5)	Venezuela	Softball City 1

=== Day 2 ===
July 23, 2016	Canada	5-0	Mexico	Softball City 1

July 23, 2016	Netherlands	8-1	Venezuela	Softball City 1

=== Medal Round ===
Semifinals
W3	Japan	3
W4	United States	4
W5	Canada	9
W6	Netherlands	2^{(5)}

Bronze Medal
L7	Japan	12
W8	Canada	4^{(4)}

Gold Medal
W7	United States	7
W9	Japan	3

== Championship Round-Single Page ==
Quarterfinals
Chinese Taipei	4
Cuba	1
Australia	1
Italy	0
Brazil	1
Great Britain	0
Puerto Rico	2
Philippines	0

Semifinals
W1	Chinese Taipei	0
W2	Australia	1
W3	Brazil	2
W4	Puerto Rico	9

Finals
W5	Australia	1
W6	Puerto Rico	4

== Placement Round-Double Page ==
=== First round ===
July 22, 2016	France	2-5	Guatemala	Softball City 2

July 22, 2016	Greece	4-0	Uganda	Softball City 2

=== Quarterfinals ===
July 22, 2016	Austria	13-0 (4)	Ecuador	Softball City 2

July 22, 2016	Peru	3-14 (4)	Czech Republic	Softball City 2

July 23, 2016	Guatemala	12-1 (4)	Ecuador	Softball City 2

July 23, 2016	Greece	4-0	Peru	Softball City 2

=== Final four ===
Semifinals
W3	Austria	3^{(5)}
W4	Czech Republic	12
W5	Guatemala	1
W6	Greece	2

Preliminary Final
L7	Austria	1^{(8)}
W8	Greece	0

Grand Final
W7	Czech Republic	5
W9	Austria	0

== Placement Round-Single Page ==
1st Round
India	1
Switzerland	5
Israel	6
Ireland	7
Kenya	F
Pakistan	0

Semifinals
Serbia	7^{(8)}
W1	Switzerland	6
W2	Ireland	11
W3	Kenya	3^{(5)}

Finals
W5	Serbia	8
W6	Ireland	5

== Final standings ==
Rank	Team
1st place, gold medalist(s)	United States
2nd place, silver medalist(s)	Japan
3rd place, bronze medalist(s)	Canada
4	Netherlands
5	Mexico
5	Venezuela
7	New Zealand
7	China
9	Puerto Rico
10	Australia
11	Chinese Taipei
11	Brazil
13	Cuba
13	Italy
13	Great Britain
13	Philippines
17	Czech Republic
18	Austria
19	Greece
20	Guatemala
21	Ecuador
21	Peru
23	France
23	Uganda
25	Serbia
26	Ireland
27	Kenya
27	Switzerland
29	Israel
29	India
31	Pakistan
