= 2026 USA Softball International Cup =

Tournament details
- Host country: United States
- Dates: July 30–August 3, 2026
- Teams: 7 (from 3 continents)
- Defending champions: United States (2019)

Final positions
- Champions: USA (10th title)
- Runner-up: Japan
- Third place: (United States) US Women's Elite
- Fourth place: Canada

The 2026 USA Softball International Cup was an international women's softball tournament It marked the return of the USA Softball International Cup for the first time since 2019.

It was hosted at Devon Park in Oklahoma City from July 30 to August 3, 2026.

The United States were champions of the tournament, defeating Japan in the final, 2-0.

== Participating teams ==
Eight teams from seven countries participated in the tournament.

Americas	Asia	Oceania
United States (2); Canada (4); USA Women's Elite (N/A)	Japan (1); China (8); Chinese Taipei (19)	Australia (11); American Samoa (42)

== Group stage ==
=== Group A ===
Pos	Team	Pld	W	L	PCT	GB	Qualification
1	Japan	3	3	0	1.000	—	Qualification to Playoff Round
2	(United States) US Women's Elite	3	2	1	.667	1	Qualification to Playoff Round
3	American Samoa	3	1	2	.333	2	Advance to Placement Round
4	Chinese Taipei	3	0	3	.000	3	Advance to Placement Round

Source: WBSC

Date	Home	Score	Away
July 30	American Samoa	0-5	Japan
July 30	(United States) US Women's Elite	6-4	Chinese Taipei
July 31	Japan	5-3	Chinese Taipei
July 31	American Samoa	3-10 (5)	(United States) US Women's Elite
August 1	Chinese Taipei	1-2	American Samoa
August 1	(United States) US Women's Elite	2-9	Japan

=== Group B ===
Pos	Team	Pld	W	L	PCT	GB	Qualification
1	United States	3	3	0	1.000	—	Qualification to Playoff Round
2	Canada	3	2	1	.667	1	Qualification to Playoff Round
3	China	3	1	2	.333	2	Advance to Placement Round
4	Australia	3	0	3	.000	3	Advance to Placement Round

Source: WBSC

Date	Home	Score	Away
July 30	China	1-3	Canada
July 30	Australia	0-12 (4)	United States
July 31	China	5-4	Australia
July 31	Canada	7-10	United States
August 1	Australia	1-9	Canada
August 1	United States	10-1	China

== Placement round ==
5th–8th Place (August 2)
A4	Chinese Taipei	4
B3	China	5
B4	Australia	2
A3	American Samoa	9

5th Place (August 3)
B3	China	7
A3	American Samoa	0
7th Place
A4	Chinese Taipei	0
B4	Australia	4

== Playoff round ==
Semifinals (August 2)
B2	Canada	5
A1	Japan	6
A2	(United States) US Women's Elite	2
B1	United States	6

Final (August 3)
A1	Japan	0
B1	United States	2
Third place
B2	Canada	0
A2	(United States) US Women's Elite	7 (5)

== Final standings ==
Rank	Team
1st place, gold medalist(s)	United States
2nd place, silver medalist(s)	Japan
3rd place, bronze medalist(s)	(United States) US Women's Elite
4	Canada
5	China
6	American Samoa
7	Australia
8	Chinese Taipei
