= U-15 Pan American Women's Softball Championship =

- Sport: Softball
- Founded: 2023
- Continent: Americas
- Most recent champion: United States (2nd title)
- Most titles: United States (2 titles)

The U-15 Pan American Women's Softball Championship is the main championship tournament between national junior (under 15) women's softball teams in Americas, governed by the WBSC Americas. The inaugural event was held in Lima, Peru. The tournament also serves as qualification to WBSC's U-15 Women's Softball World Cup for Americas.

== Results ==
Year	Host	Final			Semifinalists		
Year	Host	Champions	Score	Runners-up	3rd place	Score	4th place
2023	(Peru); Lima	United States	9–0	Mexico	Puerto Rico	5–2	Brazil
2025	(Mexico); Acapulco	United States	5–0	Mexico	Puerto Rico	4–0	Canada

== Medal table ==
Rank	Nation	Gold	Silver	Bronze	Total
1	United States	2	0	0	2
2	Mexico	0	2	0	2
3	Puerto Rico	0	0	2	2
Totals (3 entries)		2	2	2	6
