= United States women's national under-15 softball team =

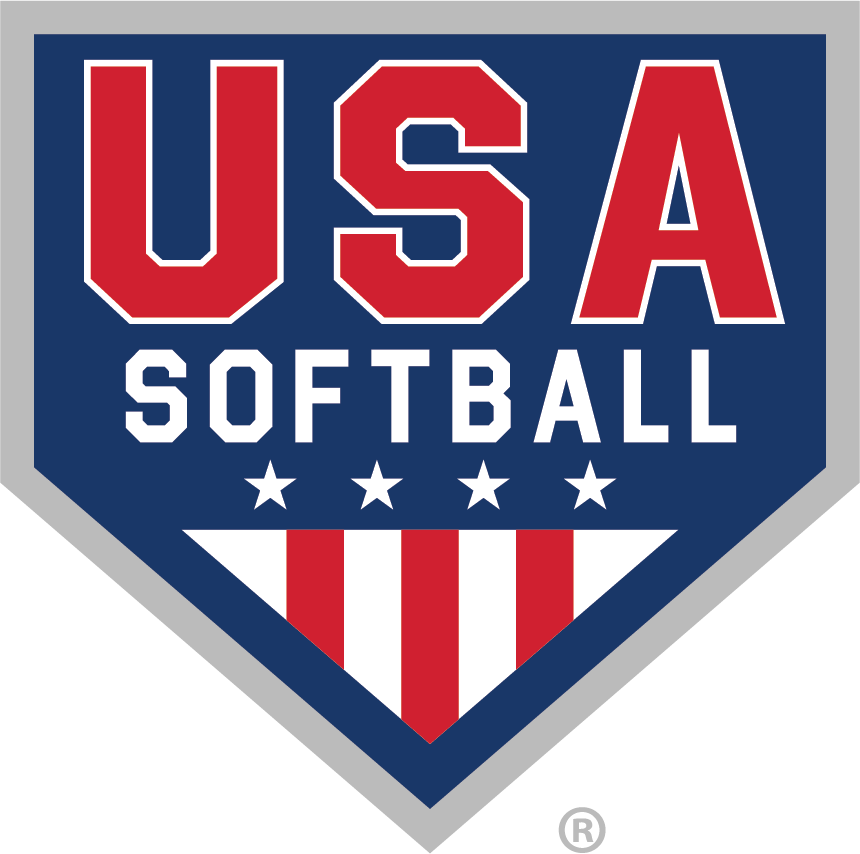

Information
- Country: United States
- Federation: USA Softball
- Confederation: WBSC Americas

United States women's national under-15 softball team
Medal record

U-15 Women's World Cup
Gold medal – first place	2023 Tokyo	
Bronze medal – third place	2025 Italy	

U-15 Pan American Women's Championship
Gold medal – first place	2023 Peru	
Gold medal – first place	2025 Acapulco	

United States women's national under-15 softball team is the junior national under-15 team for United States. The team became the first world champion in the U-15 Women's Softball World Cup, and won two times champion in U-15 Pan American Women's Softball Championship.

== Competitive record ==
=== U-15 Women's World Cup ===
Year	Result	Position	Pld	W	L	%	RS	RA
(Japan) 2023	Champions	1st	9	8	1	.889	77	3
(Italy) 2025	Third place	3rd	9	7	2	.778	74	8
Total	1 title	2/2	18	15	3	.834	151	11

=== U-15 Pan American Women's Championship ===
Year	Result	Position	Pld	W	L	%	RS	RA
(Peru) 2023	Champions	1st	8	8	0	1.000	113	0
(Mexico) 2025	Champions	1st	8	8	0	1.000	90	2
Total	2 titles	2/2	16	16	0	1.000	203	2
