= 2025 Women's Softball Asia Cup =

International softball tournament

Tournament details
- Host country: China
- Dates: 14–20 July 2025
- Teams: 10
- Venue: 1 (in 1 host city)
- Defending champions: Japan (2023)

Final positions
- Champions: Japan (9th title)
- Runner-up: China
- Third place: Chinese Taipei
- Fourth place: Philippines

The 2025 Women's Softball Asia Cup is a 14th Women's Softball Asia Cup tournament which was held from 13 to 20 July 2025 in Xi'an, China.

The tournament served as the qualifiers for the 2027 Women's Softball World Cup and the 2026 Asian Games. The top three teams qualified for the World Cup, while the top eight teams qualified for the Asian Games.

== Participants ==
- China (hosts)
- Hong Kong
- India
- Japan
- South Korea
- Malaysia
- Philippines
- Singapore
- Chinese Taipei
- Thailand

== Preliminary round ==
Pos	Team	Pld	W	L	RF	RA	RD	PCT	GB	Qualification
1	Japan	9	9	0	103	4	+99	1.000	—	Advance to Final, 2026 Asian Games, and World Cup
2	China (H)	9	8	1	70	16	+54	.889	1	Advance to Final, 2026 Asian Games, and World Cup
3	Chinese Taipei	9	7	2	78	13	+65	.778	2	Advance to Bronze medal game, and 2026 Asian Games
4	Philippines	9	6	3	78	15	+63	.667	3	Advance to Bronze medal game, and 2026 Asian Games
5	South Korea	9	5	4	55	27	+28	.556	4	2026 Asian Games
6	Hong Kong	9	4	5	36	71	−35	.444	5	2026 Asian Games
7	Singapore	9	3	6	30	55	−25	.333	6	2026 Asian Games
8	Thailand	9	2	7	16	87	−71	.222	7	2026 Asian Games
9	India	9	1	8	9	96	−87	.111	8	
10	Malaysia	9	0	9	12	103	−91	.000	9	

Source: WBSC Asia
(H) Hosts

== Matches ==
Date	Road	Score	Home
14 July	India	0–15	China
14 July	Chinese Taipei	10–0	Hong Kong
14 July	Thailand	1–15	Philippines
14 July	China	15–0	Hong Kong
14 July	South Korea	5–0	Singapore
14 July	Chinese Taipei	19–0	Thailand
14 July	Malaysia	0–10	Japan
15 July	South Korea	0–7	Philippines
15 July	Singapore	0–10	Japan
15 July	Malaysia	0–10	China
15 July	Hong Kong	7–0	Thailand
15 July	India	0–9	Singapore
15 July	South Korea	1–5	Chinese Taipei
15 July	Philippines	1–9	Japan
15 July	Thailand	1–11	China
16 July	Hong Kong	1–9	South Korea
16 July	Malaysia	1–10	Singapore
16 July	Chinese Taipei	1–4	Japan
16 July	India	0–15	Philippines
16 July	Singapore	0–7	China
16 July	Thailand	0–8	South Korea
16 July	Japan	16–0	Hong Kong
16 July	Malaysia	0–14	Philippines
17 July	South Korea	0–2	China
17 July	India	0–10	Chinese Taipei
17 July	Philippines	13–0	Singapore
17 July	Japan	16–0	Thailand
17 July	Malaysia	0–15	Chinese Taipei
17 July	India	0–7	Hong Kong
17 July	Philippines	1–2	China
17 July	South Korea	2–12	Japan
18 July	Singapore	0–11	Chinese Taipei
18 July	India	3–4	Thailand
18 July	Japan	10–0	China
18 July	Malaysia	5–15	Hong Kong
18 July	Philippines	0–3	Chinese Taipei
18 July	Malaysia	1–8	Thailand
18 July	Hong Kong	6–4	Singapore
19 July	India	0–16	Japan
19 July	Malaysia	0–15	South Korea
19 July	China	8–4	Chinese Taipei
19 July	Hong Kong	0–12	Philippines
19 July	Singapore	7–2	Thailand
19 July	Malaysia	5–6	India

== Final round ==
The final round games were declared a rainout. The standings from the preliminary round was used to determine the final ranking.

=== Bronze medal game ===
20 July 9:00 (Cancelled) Xi'an Physical Education University Softball Stadium
Team	1	2	3	4	5	6	7	R	H	E
Philippines	x	x	x	x	x	x	x	0	0	0
Chinese Taipei	x	x	x	x	x	x	x	0	0	0

=== Final ===
20 July 11:00 (Cancelled) Xi'an Physical Education University Softball Stadium
Team	1	2	3	4	5	6	7	R	H	E
China	x	x	x	x	x	x	x	0	0	0
Japan	x	x	x	x	x	x	x	0	0	0

== Final standings ==
Qualification
2027 Women's Softball World Cup Group Stages and 2026 Asian Games
2026 Asian Games

Rank	Team
Gold medal	Japan
Silver medal	China
Bronze medal	Chinese Taipei
4th	Philippines
5th	South Korea
6th	Hong Kong
7th	Singapore
8th	Thailand
9th	India
10th	Malaysia

Note: The Philippines were later awarded a wildcard in February 2026 following the withdrawal of Uganda.

== External websites ==
- Official website
