= U-15 Women's Softball World Cup =

- Most recent season or competition: 2025 U-15 Women's Softball World Cup
- Sport: Softball
- Founded: 2023
- No. of teams: 12 (from 5 continents) (Note: Since Uganda bowed out, 11 countries from four continents actually participated.)
- Confederation: World Baseball Softball Confederation
- Most recent champion: Japan (2025)
- Most titles: Japan & United States (1 title each)

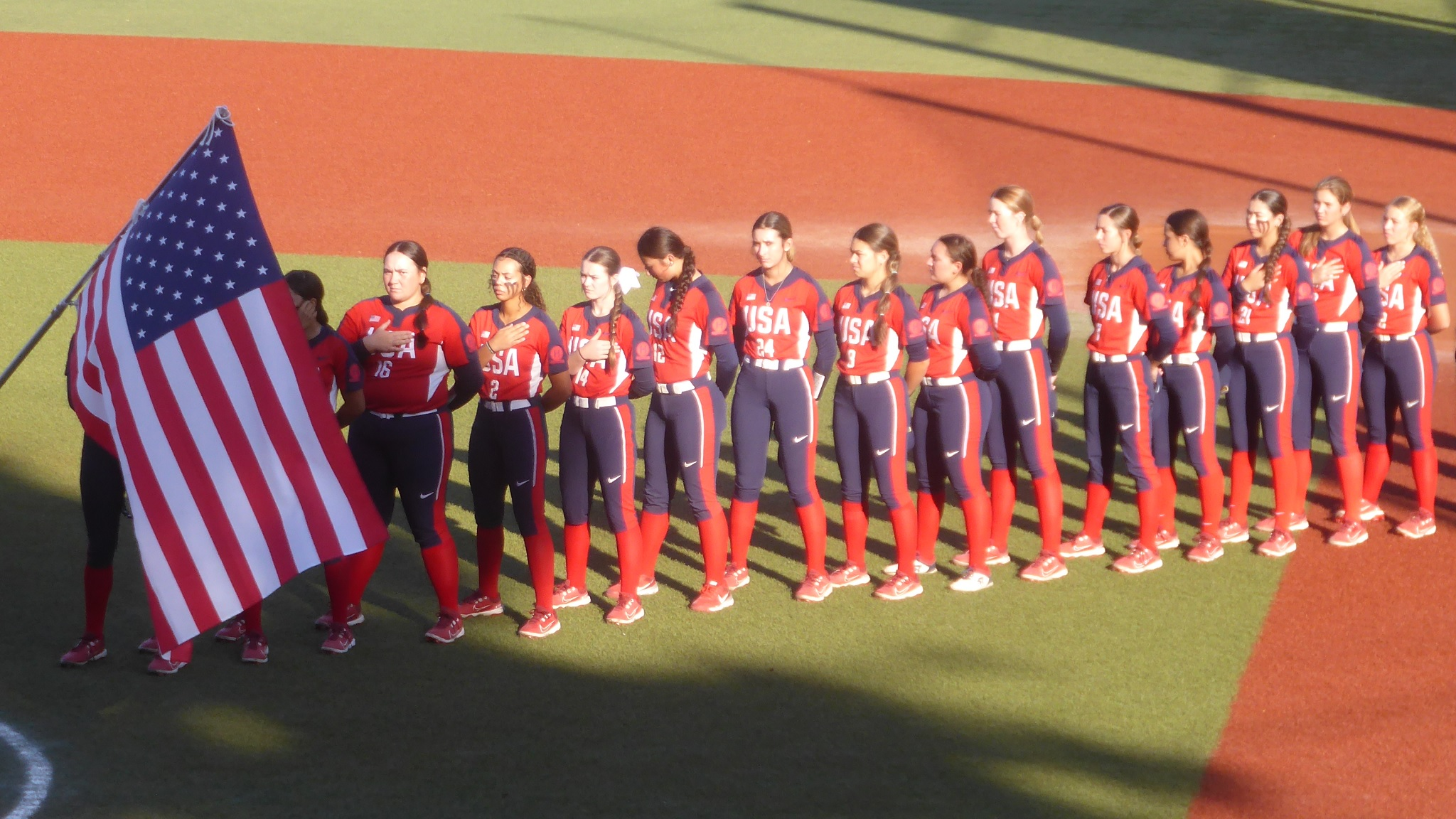
Team USA, the first world champion

The U-15 Women's Softball World Cup is an international youth women's softball tournament, organized by the World Baseball Softball Confederation (WBSC) and held every four years. The 2023 U-15 Women's Softball World Cup was the first edition of the U-15 Women's Softball World Cup, held in Tokyo, Japan, from October 21 to 29, and featured 12 national teams from five continents.

The United States became the first world champion in the category, defeating the Puerto Rican team 3–0 in the inaugural final.

== History ==
The presentation of the new tournament occurred on February 26, 2021, when the WBSC announced its Schedule for the Softball World Cups for the next nine years in the 2021-2029 competition period.

On June 9, 2022, the World Baseball Softball Confederation awarded hosting rights for the inaugural U-15 Women's Softball World Cup to the Japan Softball Association (JSA) following its Executive Board meeting. The first edition of the new World Cup would be played in Tokyo in October 2023 with the best players in the world from 12 countries. The JSA candidacy won the race against Lima, Peru.

The naming of Tokyo as the host of the WBSC U-15 Women's Softball World Cup, a youth-focused event, two years after the successful softball competition at the 2020 Summer Olympics, adds to the legacy of the Tokyo Games, which saw Japan claim the gold medal beating the United States in the final.

With the debut of this competition, the WBSC Softball World Cup portfolio of properties is completed, offering young girls from around the world the opportunity to represent their nations at the U-12 Softball World Cup. the road to the World Cup and the Olympic Games.

The United States prevailed 3–0 in the unprecedented showdown with Puerto Rico in the final of the inaugural U-15 Women's Softball World Cup at Ota Stadium in Tokyo. The United States now holds all of the women's softball World Championship titles, namely the WBSC U-15, U-18 and Senior crowns. Earlier in the day, Japan beat Chinese Taipei to claim the bronze medal.

The second edition is scheduled to be held in 2025 in Italy.

== Competition format ==
The tournament is agreed to hold a round robin Opening Round, where the participating teams will be divided into two groups, and they will all play against all the rivals in the group in a round.

After the Opening Round, the top three teams in each group will play in the Super Round. All six teams will enter the Super Round maintaining their respective Opening Round head-to-head records. The first and second place teams in the Super Round will play in the World Cup Final and the third and fourth place teams will play in the bronze medal game.

Likewise, the last three teams in each group of the Opening Round will go to the Qualification Round to define the positions from seventh to twelfth place. The same methodology will be applied as in the Super Round.

== Classification ==
With the approved format of 12 national teams, the WBSC has distributed the continental quotas as follows:

- WBSC Africa: 1 spot
- WBSC Americas: 4 spots
- WBSC Asia: 3 spots
- WBSC Europe: 2 spots
- WBSC Oceania: 1 spot
- Wild card: 1 spot

The participants will be determined through the continental championships.

== Results ==
Year	Venue	Final			Third place game		
Year	Venue	Champions	Score	Runners-up	Third place	Score	Fourth place
2023; Details	(Japan); Tokyo	United States	3–0	Puerto Rico	Japan	2–0	Chinese Taipei
2025; Details	(Italy); Caronno Pertusella	Japan	4–0	Puerto Rico	United States	4–0	Mexico
2027; Details	(United States); Oklahoma City						
2029; Details	(United States); Oklahoma City						
2031; Details	(United States); Oklahoma City						

== Medal table ==
Rank	Nation	Gold	Silver	Bronze	Total
1	Japan	1	0	1	2
1	United States	1	0	1	2
3	Puerto Rico	0	2	0	2
Totals (3 entries)		2	2	2	6

== Participating nations ==
- 1st — Champion
- 2nd — Runner-up
- 3rd — Third place
- — Host nation

Nation	2023	2025	Years
American Samoa		10th	1
Australia		8th	1
Brazil	10th		1
Canada		7th	1
Czech Republic	7th	6th	2
Chinese Taipei	4th	5th	2
Italy	8th	9th	2
Japan	3rd	1st	2
Mexico	5th	4th	2
New Zealand	11th		1
Peru	9th		1
Philippines	6th		1
Puerto Rico	2nd	2nd	2
Singapore		11th	1
Spain		12th	1
Uganda	12th		1 (Note: Uganda bowed out of the competition 2023.)
United States	1st	3rd	2
Total Nations	12	12	
