= Puerto Rico men's national softball team =

Men's national soft ball team of Puerto Rico

The Puerto Rico men's national softball team is the men's national softball team of Puerto Rico. The team competed at the 1996 ISF Men's World Championship in Midland, Michigan where they finished with 5 wins and 5 losses. The team competed at the 2009 ISF Men's World Championship in Saskatoon, Saskatchewan where they finished twelfth.
