= Serbia women's national softball team =

The Serbia women's national softball team represents Serbia in international women’s softball competitions. It is controlled by the Serbian Softball Federation.

== World Championship ==
- 2016 - Qualified

== European Championship ==
- 1979–2005 - Did not participate
- 2007 - 12th (in B division)
- 2009–2013 - Did not participate

== European U22 Championship ==
- 2008–2014 - Did not participate

== European Junior Championship ==
- 1991–2008 - Did not participate
- 2010 - 14th
- 2012 - Did not participate
- 2014 - 11th

== European Cadet Championship ==
- 2009–2009 - Did not participate
- 2011 - 10th place
- 2013 - 10th place
- 2015 - Did not participate

== European Championship Minime Girls ==
- 2002–2008 - Did not participate
- 2010 - 2nd
