= British Softball Federation =

UK governing body of Softball

- BSF logo
- Abbreviation: BSF
- Legal status: Sport governing body
- Region served: United Kingdom
- Official language: English
- Affiliations: ESF ISF
- Website: http://www.britishsoftball.org/

The British Softball Federation (BSF) is the national governing body of softball within the United Kingdom, organising fastpitch and slowpitch leagues and national tournaments and registering players.

The BSF is a federated member of both the European Softball Federation and the International Softball Federation. The BSF is a member of BaseballSoftballUK (BSUK), a sports development agency. Until December 2020, this membership was joint with the British Baseball Federation. For several years, the BSF was the sole member of BSUK until the BBF rejoined in February 2025.

Softball umpires are registered and organised via the associated British Association of Softball Umpires (BASU), their official body in the UK.

UK Softball follow the International Softball Federation rules.

In 2007 the BSF founded a Hall of Fame.

== See also ==
- National Softball Hall of Fame and Museum § British Hall
