= Switzerland women's national softball team =

The Switzerland women's national softball team is the national team of Switzerland. It is governed by the Swiss Baseball and Softball Federation.

== Results ==
World Championship

Year	1990	1994	1998	2002	2006	2010	2012	2014	2016
Standing	nc	nc	nc	nc	nc	nc	nc	nc	27th

nc = not competed

European Championship

Year	1979	1981	1983	1984	1986	1988	1990	1992	1995	1997	1999	2001	2003	2005	2007	2009	2011	2013	2015	2017	2019	2021	2022	2024	2025
Standing	nc	nc	nc	nc	nc	nc	nc	nc	12th	12th	12th	14th	13th	nc	17th	19th	20th	14th	18th	18th	16th	nc	17th	14th	12th

nc = not competed
