= 2017 World Cup of Softball =

2017 World Cup of Softball XII

Tournament details
- Host country: United States
- City: Oklahoma City, Oklahoma
- Dates: July 5-9, 2017
- Teams: 8 (from 3 continents)
- Venues: ASA Hall of Fame Stadium
- Defending champions: Japan (2016)

Final positions
- Champions: Japan (4th title)
- Runner-up: United States
- Third place: Canada
- Fourth place: Australia

Tournament statistics
- Games played: 32
- Best batting average: (United States) Madilyn "Bubba" Nickles (USA Juniors)
- Best ERA: (United States) Ally Carda (Japan) Yukiko Ueno
- Most strikeouts (as pitcher): (Australia) Kaia Parnaby

The twelfth World Cup of Softball was held between July 5-9, 2017, in Oklahoma City. Japan defended their championship by defeating the United States in the title game.

== Participating teams ==
Seven countries participated in the tournament with the United States both sending their senior and junior team. The rankings of the national teams except the United States juniors team are included.

Americas	Asia	Oceania
United States (2); Canada (3); Puerto Rico (7); Mexico (10); United States Juniors (N/A)	Japan (1); Philippines (17)	Australia (4)

== Preliminary round standings ==
Rank	Team	Wins	Losses	GB
1	United States	7	0	0
2	Japan	6	1	1
3	Canada	4	3	3
4	Australia	3	4	4
5	United States Juniors	3	4	4
6	Puerto Rico	2	5	5
7	Philippines	2	5	5
8	Mexico	1	6	6

== Placement games ==
7th Place Game

July 9, 2017	Mexico	7–8 (8)	Philippines	ASA Hall of Fame Stadium

5th Place Game

July 9, 2017	Puerto Rico	0–7 (5)	United States Juniors	ASA Hall of Fame Stadium

Bronze Medal Game

July 9, 2017	Australia	0–3	Canada	ASA Hall of Fame Stadium

Gold Medal Game

July 9, 2017	Japan	2–1	United States	ASA Hall of Fame Stadium
