= Aruba women's national softball team =

Aruba women's national softball team is the national team for Aruba. The team competed at the 1990 ISF Women's World Championship in Normal, Illinois where they finished with 2 wins and 7 losses.
