= Argentina women's national softball team =

Information
- Country: Argentina
- Federation: Argentina Softball Association
- Confederation: WBSC Americas
- Manager: Guillermo Spotorno
- WBSC World Rank: 30 ▼2 (31 December 2025)

Olympic Games
- Appearances: none

Women's Softball World Cup
- Appearances: 3 (First in 1990)
- Best result: Round 1, 1990, 1994, 2010

The Argentina women's national softball team is the national team of Argentina. It is governed by the Confederacion Argentina de Softball and takes part in international team softball competitions.

== History ==
The team competed at the 1990 ISF Women's World Championship in Normal, Illinois where they finished with 0 wins and 9 losses. The team competed at the 1994 ISF Women's World Championship in St. John's, Newfoundland where they finished twenty-second. The team competed at the 2010 ISF Women's World Championship in Caracas, Venezuela where they finished fourteenth. The team won the bronze medal at the 2010 South American Games after they lost to Colombia in the Page playoff system third place match. The team won the Sudamerican Games in 2019 and 2024.
