= Colombia women's national softball team =

Colombia women's national softball team is the national team for Colombia. The team competed at the 1994 ISF Women's World Championship in St. John's, Newfoundland where they finished seventeenth. The team competed at the 1998 ISF Women's World Championship in Fujinomiya City, Japan where they finished thirteenth. The team competed at the 2006 ISF Women's World Championship in Beijing, China where they finished sixteenth.
