= Peru women's national softball team =

Information
- Country: Peru
- Federation: Peru Softball Federation
- Confederation: WBSC Americas
- WBSC World Rank: 18 (31 December 2025)

Uniforms
Home	Away

Women's Softball World Cup
- Appearances: 2 (First in 2016)
- Best result: 21st

The Peru women's national softball team is the national team for Peru. It is governed by the Peru Softball Federation (Federación Deportiva Nacional Peruana de Sóftbol) and takes part in international team softball competitions.

== History ==
Softball was introduced in Peru in the early 1970s. The first Peru team was formed in 1977. It took part in the inaugural Women's Softball South American Championship in 1981 finishing as runners-up to Venezuela. The team became champions in the next edition in 1984.

The team qualified for the softball competition of the 1987 Pan American Games in Indianopolis in the United States. The team stop competing internationally in 2000 due to an economic crisis before returning in 2007.

Peru debuted at the Women's Softball World Cup in the 2016 edition back when it was still known as the World Championship.

Peru hosted one of the group tournaments of the 2027 Women's Softball World Cup in July 2026.
