= 2007 Asian Baseball Championship =

The 24th Asian Baseball Championship was contested in Taichung, Taiwan in November and December 2007. The tournament is sanctioned by the Asian Baseball Federation. The winner of the tournament will gain automatic entry into the 2008 Olympic Games in Beijing. The second and third place teams will advance to the final 2008 Olympic qualifier, which was also hosted by Taiwan in March 2008.

== B Level ==
The B level teams are Hong Kong (IBAF Asian Cup Champion 2006), Thailand, Philippines and Pakistan. However, the winner will advance to join the three A level teams in a round robin competition.

Team	W	D	L	Tiebreaker
Philippines	2	1	0	-
Thailand	1	1	1	-
Hong Kong	1	0	2	1-0
Pakistan	1	0	2	0-1

November 27, 2007

Taichung Baseball Field	Philippines	2–0	Pakistan
Intercontinental Stadium	Thailand	8–4	Hong Kong

November 28, 2007

Intercontinental Stadium	Pakistan	5–3	Thailand
Intercontinental Stadium	Hong Kong	1–4	Philippines

November 29, 2007

Intercontinental Stadium	Thailand	0–0 (F/12)	Philippines
Intercontinental Stadium	Hong Kong	8–6	Pakistan

== A Level ==
The winner from the B Level of the tournament will join the three traditional powers of Asia in a round robin competition. All games will be played at Taichung Intercontinental Baseball Stadium.

Team	W	L	Tiebreaker
Japan	3	0	-
South Korea	2	1	-
Chinese Taipei	1	2	-
Philippines	0	3	-

December 1, 2007

Intercontinental Stadium	South Korea	5–2	Chinese Taipei
Intercontinental Stadium	Philippines	0–10 (F/7)	Japan

December 2, 2007

Intercontinental Stadium	Chinese Taipei	9–0	Philippines
Intercontinental Stadium	Japan	4–3	South Korea

December 3, 2007

Intercontinental Stadium	Philippines	1–13 (F/7)	South Korea
Intercontinental Stadium	Japan	10–2	Chinese Taipei

== Final standings ==
Place	Team
Gold	Japan
Silver	South Korea
Bronze	Chinese Taipei
4.	Philippines
5.	Thailand
6.	Hong Kong
7.	Pakistan

2007 Asian champions

Japan
15th title

== Controversy ==
In the match between Japan and South Korea on December 2, a dispute arose over the lineup table of the South Korea team. In the tournament, teams were obliged to submit a starting players table 1 hour before a game begin. Managers have made a consensus to change players if unexpected injuries were happen, which are commonly accepted in the international baseball games.

Despite these arrangements, the South Korea manager Kim Kyung-Moon drastically changed his starting players immediately before the game, including a starting pitcher and this substitution clearly advantaged the South Korea team. Japanese manager Senichi Hoshino requested an explanation but his appeal to an umpire was turned down.

After the game was over, which resulted a Japanese win, Hoshino made comments critical of South Korean acts as ungentlemanly conduct. Japanese team officially submitted a protest note to the South Korea team and the International Baseball Federation (IBAF). John C. Ostermeyer, secretary general of IBAF, acknowledged this appeal and announced that IBAF express regret at the South Korea team and plan to change regulations at a meeting held in January 2008.

== See also ==
- 2006 Intercontinental Cup
- Baseball at the 2006 Asian Games
- 2007 Baseball World Cup
- Baseball at the 2008 Summer Olympics - Qualification
- List of sporting events in Taiwan
