= 2009 World Youth Baseball Championship =

Tournament details
- Country: Taiwan
- Venue(s): 2 (in 1 host city)
- Dates: 15 – 23 August
- Teams: 12
- Defending champions: Cuba

Final positions
- Champions: United States (4th title)
- Runners-up: Cuba
- Third place: Mexico
- Fourth place: Venezuela

Tournament statistics
- Games played: 46
- Attendance: 8,244 (179 per game)
- Best BA: (United States) JoMarcos Woods (.696)
- Most HRs: (Cuba) Guillermo Aviles (3)
- Most SBs: (Netherlands) Urving Kemp (6)
- Best ERA: (Cuba) Elbis Martinez (United States) Cory Geisler (United States) John Hochstatter (0.00)
- Most Ks (as pitcher): (South Korea) Seung-Jun Baek (26)

The 2009 World Youth Baseball Championship was an international baseball tournament scheduled to start on 15 August 2009. It was the 14th time the World Youth Cup has taken place. Taichung, Taiwan hosted the tournament and 12 nations competed, including defending champions Cuba.

== Round 1 ==
=== Group A ===
Qualified for the quarter-finals
Did not qualify for the quarter-finals

#	Team	Games	Wins	Losses	Tiebreaker
1	Cuba	5	5	0	–
2	Japan	5	3	2	1-0
3	Venezuela	5	3	2	0-1
4	Chinese Taipei	5	2	3	1-0
5	Australia	5	2	3	0-1
6	Russia	5	0	5	–

August 15, 2009; Game 1	Cuba	9 – 1	Australia	(Taiwan) Taichung Intercontinental; Attendance: 65
August 15, 2009; Game 1		Boxscore		(Taiwan) Taichung Intercontinental; Attendance: 65

August 15, 2009; Game 3	Chinese Taipei	14 – 15	Venezuela	(Taiwan) Taichung Intercontinental; Attendance: 1,350
August 15, 2009; Game 3		Boxscore		(Taiwan) Taichung Intercontinental; Attendance: 1,350

August 15, 2009; Game 5	Russia	0 – 20 (F/5)	Japan	(Taiwan) Taichung Intercontinental; Attendance: 45
August 15, 2009; Game 5		Boxscore		(Taiwan) Taichung Intercontinental; Attendance: 45

August 16, 2009; Game 7	Australia	15 – 2 (F/7)	Russia	(Taiwan) Taichung Intercontinental; Attendance: 45
August 16, 2009; Game 7		Boxscore		(Taiwan) Taichung Intercontinental; Attendance: 45

August 16, 2009; Game 9	Chinese Taipei	12 – 15	Japan	(Taiwan) Taichung Intercontinental; Attendance: 1,840
August 16, 2009; Game 9		Boxscore		(Taiwan) Taichung Intercontinental; Attendance: 1,840

August 16, 2009; Game 11	Venezuela	2 – 12	Cuba	(Taiwan) Taichung Intercontinental; Attendance: 37
August 16, 2009; Game 11		Boxscore		(Taiwan) Taichung Intercontinental; Attendance: 37

August 17, 2009; Game 13	Russia	1 – 19 (F/5)	Chinese Taipei	(Taiwan) Taichung Baseball Field; Attendance: 77
August 17, 2009; Game 13		Boxscore		(Taiwan) Taichung Baseball Field; Attendance: 77

August 17, 2009; Game 15	Venezuela	9 – 8	Australia	(Taiwan) Taichung Baseball Field; Attendance: 75
August 17, 2009; Game 15		Boxscore		(Taiwan) Taichung Baseball Field; Attendance: 75

August 17, 2009; Game 17	Japan	2 – 5	Cuba	(Taiwan) Taichung Baseball Field; Attendance: 320
August 17, 2009; Game 17		Boxscore		(Taiwan) Taichung Baseball Field; Attendance: 320

August 18, 2009; Game 19	Japan	7 – 6	Venezuela	(Taiwan) Taichung Baseball Field; Attendance: 50
August 18, 2009; Game 19		Boxscore		(Taiwan) Taichung Baseball Field; Attendance: 50

August 18, 2009; Game 21	Cuba	16 – 1 (F/5)	Russia	(Taiwan) Taichung Baseball Field; Attendance: 20
August 18, 2009; Game 21		Boxscore		(Taiwan) Taichung Baseball Field; Attendance: 20

August 18, 2009; Game 23	Australia	4 – 8	Chinese Taipei	(Taiwan) Taichung Baseball Field; Attendance: 250
August 18, 2009; Game 23		Boxscore		(Taiwan) Taichung Baseball Field; Attendance: 250

August 19, 2009; Game 25	Venezuela	21 – 1 (F/5)	Russia	(Taiwan) Taichung Intercontinental; Attendance: 10
August 19, 2009; Game 25		Boxscore		(Taiwan) Taichung Intercontinental; Attendance: 10

August 19, 2009; Game 27	Japan	9 – 10	Australia	(Taiwan) Taichung Intercontinental; Attendance: 100
August 19, 2009; Game 27		Boxscore		(Taiwan) Taichung Intercontinental; Attendance: 100

August 19, 2009; Game 29	Chinese Taipei	5 – 7	Cuba	(Taiwan) Taichung Intercontinental; Attendance: 520
August 19, 2009; Game 29		Boxscore		(Taiwan) Taichung Intercontinental; Attendance: 520

=== Group B ===
Panama was originally scheduled to participate in Group B of the tournament, but withdrew citing financial concerns. The International Baseball Federation (IBAF) announced that Hong Kong would be their replacements, shortly before the tournament was due to commence.

Qualified for the quarter-finals
Did not qualify for the quarter-finals

#	Team	Games	Wins	Losses	Tiebreaker
1	United States	5	5	0	–
2	South Korea	5	4	1	–
3	Mexico	5	3	2	–
4	Netherlands	5	2	3	–
5	Hong Kong	5	1	4	–
6	Czech Republic	5	0	5	–

August 15, 2009; Game 2	Hong Kong	0 – 28 (F/5)	United States	(Taiwan) Taichung Baseball Field; Attendance: 30
August 15, 2009; Game 2		Boxscore		(Taiwan) Taichung Baseball Field; Attendance: 30

August 15, 2009; Game 4	South Korea	5 – 4	Mexico	(Taiwan) Taichung Baseball Field; Attendance: 25
August 15, 2009; Game 4		Boxscore		(Taiwan) Taichung Baseball Field; Attendance: 25

August 15, 2009; Game 6	Czech Republic	2 – 11	Netherlands	(Taiwan) Taichung Baseball Field; Attendance: 50
August 15, 2009; Game 6		Boxscore		(Taiwan) Taichung Baseball Field; Attendance: 50

August 16, 2009; Game 8	Mexico	20 – 3 (F/5)	Hong Kong	(Taiwan) Taichung Baseball Field; Attendance: 35
August 16, 2009; Game 8		Boxscore		(Taiwan) Taichung Baseball Field; Attendance: 35

August 16, 2009; Game 10	United States	18 – 1 (F/6)	Czech Republic	(Taiwan) Taichung Baseball Field; Attendance: 30
August 16, 2009; Game 10		Boxscore		(Taiwan) Taichung Baseball Field; Attendance: 30

August 16, 2009; Game 12	Netherlands	0 – 10 (F/7)	South Korea	(Taiwan) Taichung Baseball Field; Attendance: 50
August 16, 2009; Game 12		Boxscore		(Taiwan) Taichung Baseball Field; Attendance: 50

August 17, 2009; Game 14	United States	15 – 1 (F/7)	Netherlands	(Taiwan) Taichung Intercontinental; Attendance: 30
August 17, 2009; Game 14		Boxscore		(Taiwan) Taichung Intercontinental; Attendance: 30

August 17, 2009; Game 16	Czech Republic	2 – 13 (F/8)	Mexico	(Taiwan) Taichung Intercontinental; Attendance: 120
August 17, 2009; Game 16		Boxscore		(Taiwan) Taichung Intercontinental; Attendance: 120

August 17, 2009; Game 18	Hong Kong	0 – 16 (F/7)	South Korea	(Taiwan) Taichung Intercontinental; Attendance: 45
August 17, 2009; Game 18		Boxscore		(Taiwan) Taichung Intercontinental; Attendance: 45

August 18, 2009; Game 20	South Korea	14 – 3 (F/7)	Czech Republic	(Taiwan) Taichung Intercontinental; Attendance: 45
August 18, 2009; Game 20		Boxscore		(Taiwan) Taichung Intercontinental; Attendance: 45

August 18, 2009; Game 22	Netherlands	16 – 6 (F/7)	Hong Kong	(Taiwan) Taichung Intercontinental; Attendance: 65
August 18, 2009; Game 22		Boxscore		(Taiwan) Taichung Intercontinental; Attendance: 65

August 18, 2009; Game 24	Mexico	6 – 16	United States	(Taiwan) Taichung Intercontinental; Attendance: 73
August 18, 2009; Game 24		Boxscore		(Taiwan) Taichung Intercontinental; Attendance: 73

August 19, 2009; Game 26	Netherlands	6 – 8	Mexico	(Taiwan) Taichung Baseball Field; Attendance: 85
August 19, 2009; Game 26		Boxscore		(Taiwan) Taichung Baseball Field; Attendance: 85

August 19, 2009; Game 28	United States	11 – 1 (F/7)	South Korea	(Taiwan) Taichung Baseball Field; Attendance: 50
August 19, 2009; Game 28		Boxscore		(Taiwan) Taichung Baseball Field; Attendance: 50

August 19, 2009; Game 30	Hong Kong	6 – 5	Czech Republic	(Taiwan) Taichung Baseball Field; Attendance: 80
August 19, 2009; Game 30		Boxscore		(Taiwan) Taichung Baseball Field; Attendance: 80

== Round 2 ==
=== Bottom four ===
August 21, 2009; Game 31	Australia	15 – 0 (F/5)	Czech Republic	(Taiwan) Taichung Intercontinental; Attendance: 45
August 21, 2009; Game 31		Boxscore		(Taiwan) Taichung Intercontinental; Attendance: 45

August 21, 2009; Game 32	Hong Kong	3 – 5	Russia	(Taiwan) Taichung Baseball Field; Attendance: 65
August 21, 2009; Game 32		Boxscore		(Taiwan) Taichung Baseball Field; Attendance: 65

August 22, 2009; Game 37	Australia	10 – 0 (F/7)	Russia	(Taiwan) Taichung Intercontinental; Attendance: 47
August 22, 2009; Game 37		Boxscore		(Taiwan) Taichung Intercontinental; Attendance: 47

August 22, 2009; Game 38	Czech Republic	16 – 0 (F/5)	Hong Kong	(Taiwan) Taichung Baseball Field; Attendance: 13
August 22, 2009; Game 38		Boxscore		(Taiwan) Taichung Baseball Field; Attendance: 13

=== Quarter-finals ===
August 21, 2009; Game 33	Cuba	13 – 3 (F/7)	Netherlands	(Taiwan) Taichung Intercontinental; Attendance: 25
August 21, 2009; Game 33		Boxscore		(Taiwan) Taichung Intercontinental; Attendance: 25

August 21, 2009; Game 34	Japan	4 – 5	Mexico	(Taiwan) Taichung Baseball Field; Attendance: 50
August 21, 2009; Game 34		Boxscore		(Taiwan) Taichung Baseball Field; Attendance: 50

August 21, 2009; Game 35	United States	11 – 8	Chinese Taipei	(Taiwan) Taichung Intercontinental; Attendance: 468
August 21, 2009; Game 35		Boxscore		(Taiwan) Taichung Intercontinental; Attendance: 468

August 21, 2009; Game 36	South Korea	5 – 11	Venezuela	(Taiwan) Taichung Baseball Field; Attendance: 100
August 21, 2009; Game 36		Boxscore		(Taiwan) Taichung Baseball Field; Attendance: 100

=== Semi-finals ===
August 22, 2009; Game 39	Cuba	9 – 0	Venezuela	(Taiwan) Taichung Intercontinental; Attendance: 156
August 22, 2009; Game 39		Boxscore		(Taiwan) Taichung Intercontinental; Attendance: 156

August 22, 2009; Game 40	Netherlands	4 – 5	South Korea	(Taiwan) Taichung Baseball Field; Attendance: 90
August 22, 2009; Game 40		Boxscore		(Taiwan) Taichung Baseball Field; Attendance: 90

August 22, 2009; Game 41	United States	9 – 5	Mexico	(Taiwan) Taichung Intercontinental; Attendance: 120
August 22, 2009; Game 41		Boxscore		(Taiwan) Taichung Intercontinental; Attendance: 120

August 22, 2009; Game 42	Chinese Taipei	10 – 6	Japan	(Taiwan) Taichung Baseball Field; Attendance: 420
August 22, 2009; Game 42		Boxscore		(Taiwan) Taichung Baseball Field; Attendance: 420

== Final round ==
=== 7th place ===
August 23, 2009; Game 43	Netherlands	1 – 11 (F/7)	Japan	(Taiwan) Taichung Baseball Field; Attendance: 75
August 23, 2009; Game 43		Boxscore		(Taiwan) Taichung Baseball Field; Attendance: 75

=== 5th place ===
August 23, 2009; Game 44	Chinese Taipei	11 – 0 (F/7)	South Korea	(Taiwan) Taichung Baseball Field; Attendance: 263
August 23, 2009; Game 44		Boxscore		(Taiwan) Taichung Baseball Field; Attendance: 263

=== 3rd place ===
August 23, 2009; Game 45	Mexico	11 – 10	Venezuela	(Taiwan) Taichung Intercontinental; Attendance: 65
August 23, 2009; Game 45		Boxscore		(Taiwan) Taichung Intercontinental; Attendance: 65

=== Final ===
August 23, 2009; Game 46	Cuba	6 – 7	United States	(Taiwan) Taichung Intercontinental; Attendance: 625
August 23, 2009; Game 46		Boxscore		(Taiwan) Taichung Intercontinental; Attendance: 625

== Final standings ==
Rank	Country
Gold medal	United States
Silver medal	Cuba
Bronze medal	Mexico
4th	Venezuela
5th	Chinese Taipei
6th	South Korea
7th	Japan
8th	Netherlands
9th	Australia
10th	Russia
11th	Czech Republic
12th	Hong Kong

== Awards ==
The IBAF announced the following awards at the completion of the tournament.

All Star Team
Position	Player
Pitcher (RHP)	(Cuba) Héctor Mendoza
Pitcher (LHP)	(United States) Cory Geisler
Catcher	(Australia) Guy Edmonds
First Base	(Cuba) Guillermo Aviles
Second Base	(Venezuela) Rougned Odor
Third Base	(Chinese Taipei) Lin-Jen Chu
Short Stop	(United States) Francisco Lindor
Outfield	(United States) Austin Cousino
Outfield	(Japan) Katsushi Nakamichi
Outfield	(United States) JoMarcos Woods

== See also ==
- List of sporting events in Taiwan
