= 2022 U-15 Baseball World Cup =

Tournament details
- Country: Mexico
- Dates: 26 August - 4 September
- Teams: 13

Final positions
- Champions: United States (7th title)
- Runners-up: Cuba
- Third place: Chinese Taipei
- Fourth place: Japan

Awards
- MVP: (United States) Coy James

The 2022 U-15 Baseball World Cup or the V U-15 Baseball World Cup was an under-15 international baseball competition held in Sonora, Mexico from August 26 to September 4, 2022.

The United States won their second consecutive and overall seventh title, after defeated Cuba 4–3 in final.

== Teams ==
The following 13 teams qualified for the tournament.

Pool A	Pool B	Pool C
Cuba	Colombia	Guam
Czech Republic	France	Puerto Rico
Mexico	Japan	South Africa
Chinese Taipei	Panama	United States
		Venezuela

== First round ==
=== Group A ===
Pos	Team	Pld	W	L	RF	RA	PCT	GB	Qualification
1	Cuba	3	3	0	25	6	1.000	—	Advance to super round
2	Chinese Taipei	3	2	1	11	6	.667	1	Advance to super round
3	Mexico (H)	3	1	2	6	6	.333	2	Advance to Placement Round 7th-9th
4	Czech Republic	3	0	3	4	28	.000	3	Advance to Placement Round 10th-13th

Source: WBSC
(H) Hosts

Date	Local time	Road team	Score	Home team	Inn.	Venue	Game duration	Attendance	Boxscore
26 Aug	20:30	Cuba	4-2	Mexico		Estadio Sonora	2:20	2,521	Boxscore
27 Aug	15:00	Czech Republic	2-18	Cuba	F/5	Estadio Héctor Espino	2:08	61	Boxscore
27 Aug	19:30	Mexico	1-2	Chinese Taipei	F/5	Estadio Héctor Espino	1:12	2,759	Boxscore
28 Aug	17:00	Chinese Taipei	7-2	Czech Republic		Estadio Sonora	2:27	200	Boxscore
29 Aug	19:30	Czech Republic	0-3	Mexico		Estadio Sonora	1:54	451	Boxscore
30 Aug	19:30	Cuba	3-2	Chinese Taipei		Estadio Sonora	2:41	121	Boxscore

=== Group B ===
Pos	Team	Pld	W	L	RF	RA	PCT	GB	Qualification
1	Japan	3	3	0	21	4	1.000	—	Advance to super round
2	Panama	3	2	1	21	5	.667	1	Advance to super round
3	Colombia	3	1	2	10	18	.333	2	Advance to Placement Round 7th-9th
4	France	3	0	3	2	27	.000	3	Advance to Placement Round 10th-13th

Source: WBSC

Date	Local time	Road team	Score	Home team	Inn.	Venue	Game duration	Attendance	Boxscore
26 Aug	19:30	Colombia	0-10	Panama	F/5	Estadio Héctor Espino	2:04	150	Boxscore
27 Aug	15:00	Colombia	6-1	France		Estadio Sonora	2:08	150	Boxscore
27 Aug	19:30	Panama	0-4	Japan		Estadio Sonora	2:26	150	Boxscore
28 Aug	20:00	France	0-10	Japan	F/6	Estadio Sonora	1:58	232	Boxscore
29 Aug	19:30	France	1-11	Panama	F/5	Estadio Héctor Espino	1:46	300	Boxscore
30 Aug	19:30	Japan	7-4	Colombia		Estadio Héctor Espino	2:17	250	Boxscore

=== Group C ===
Pos	Team	Pld	W	L	RF	RA	PCT	GB	Qualification
1	United States	4	4	0	62	9	1.000	—	Advance to super round
2	Puerto Rico	4	3	1	41	16	.750	1	Advance to super round
3	Venezuela	4	2	2	30	14	.500	2	Advance to Placement Round 7th-9th
4	Guam	4	1	3	12	45	.250	3	Advance to Placement Round 10th-13th
5	South Africa	4	0	4	10	71	.000	4	Advance to Placement Round 10th-13th

Source: WBSC

Date	Local time	Road team	Score	Home team	Inn.	Venue	Game duration	Attendance	Boxscore
26 Aug	10:30	South Africa	0-29	United States	F/5	Estadio Héctor Espino	2:30	100	Boxscore
26 Aug	10:30	Puerto Rico	7-0	Venezuela	F/5	Estadio Sonora	2:03	80	Boxscore
27 Aug	10:30	South Africa	8-10	Guam		Estadio Héctor Espino	2:21	59	Boxscore
27 Aug	10:30	Venezuela	4-5	United States		Estadio Sonora	3:07	150	Boxscore
28 Aug	10:30	United States	13-1	Guam	F/5	Estadio Sonora	2:10	45	Boxscore
28 Aug	13:30	Puerto Rico	17-1	South Africa	F/5	Estadio Sonora	2:14	150	Boxscore
29 Aug	10:30	United States	15-4	Puerto Rico		Estadio Héctor Espino	3:38	200	Boxscore
29 Aug	10:30	Guam	1-11	Venezuela	F/5	Estadio Sonora	1:47	100	Boxscore
30 Aug	10:30	Guam	0-13	Puerto Rico	F/5	Estadio Héctor Espino	1:34	150	Boxscore
30 Aug	10:30	Venezuela	15-1	South Africa	F/5	Estadio Sonora	1:56	33	Boxscore

== Super round ==
Pos	Team	Pld	W	L	RF	RA	PCT	GB	Qualification
1	United States	5	4	1	48	22	.800 (Note: Head-to-head result: Cuba 1-11 United States)	—	Advance to final
2	Cuba	5	4	1	24	20	.800	—	Advance to final
3	Chinese Taipei	5	3	2	22	21	.600 (Note: Head-to-head result: Chinese Taipei 6-4 Japan)	1	Advance to third-place game
4	Japan	5	3	2	29	20	.600	1	Advance to third-place game
5	Puerto Rico	5	1	4	16	40	.200	3	
6	Panama	5	0	5	14	30	.000	4	

Source: WBSC
Notes:

Date	Local time	Road team	Score	Home team	Inn.	Venue	Game duration	Attendance	Boxscore
31 Aug	15:00	Chinese Taipei	9-0	Puerto Rico		Estadio Sonora	2:35	82	Boxscore
31 Aug	19:30	United States	6-12	Japan		Estadio Sonora	3:31	323	Boxscore
31 Aug	19:30	Panama	3-8	Cuba	F/4	Estadio Héctor Espino	1:35	250	Boxscore
1 Sep	13:30	Panama	5-6	United States		Estadio Sonora	3:06	150	Boxscore
1 Sep	17:00	Puerto Rico	4-5	Cuba		Estadio Sonora	2:46	150	Boxscore
1 Sep	21:00	Chinese Taipei	6-4	Japan		Estadio Sonora	2:14	151	Boxscore
2 Sep	10:30	Puerto Rico	7-2	Panama		Estadio Sonora	3:09	54	Boxscore
2 Sep	15:00	Chinese Taipei	0-10	United States	F/5	Estadio Sonora	1:46	65	Boxscore
2 Sep	19:30	Cuba	7-0	Japan		Estadio Héctor Espino			forfeit
3 Sep	10:30	Chinese Taipei	5-4	Panama	F/8	Estadio Sonora	2:15	57	Boxscore
3 Sep	15:15	Puerto Rico	1-9	Japan		Estadio Sonora	2:25	89	Boxscore
3 Sep	19:30	Cuba	1-11	United States	F/6	Estadio Sonora	2:34	213	Boxscore

== Placement round ==
=== 7th-9th place ===
Pos	Team	Pld	W	L	RF	RA	PCT	GB
1	Mexico	2	2	0	19	10	1.000	—
2	Venezuela	2	1	1	21	16	.500	1
3	Colombia	2	0	2	15	29	.000	2

Source: WBSC

Date	Local time	Road team	Score	Home team	Inn.	Venue	Game duration	Attendance	Boxscore
1 Sep	19:30	Mexico	8-3	Venezuela		Estadio Héctor Espino	2:21	567	Boxscore
2 Sep	19:30	Colombia	8-18	Venezuela	F/6	Estadio Sonora	2:49	76	Boxscore
3 Sep	19:30	Mexico	11-7	Colombia		Estadio Héctor Espino	2:55	835	Boxscore

=== 10th-13th place ===
Pos	Team	Pld	W	L	RF	RA	PCT	GB
1	Czech Republic	3	3	0	20	1	1.000	—
2	France	3	2	1	18	5	.667	1
3	Guam	3	1	2	11	24	.333	2
4	South Africa	3	0	3	9	28	.000	3

Source: WBSC

Date	Local time	Road team	Score	Home team	Inn.	Venue	Game duration	Attendance	Boxscore
31 Aug	10:30	Czech Republic	4-0	France		Estadio Héctor Espino	1:56	150	Boxscore
1 Sep	10:30	Guam	0-10	France	F/5	Estadio Sonora	1:28	33	Boxscore
2 Sep	10:30	South Africa	1-8	France		Estadio Héctor Espino	2:16	150	Boxscore
2 Sep	15:00	Guam	1-6	Czech Republic		Estadio Héctor Espino	1:48	120	Boxscore
3 Sep	10:30	South Africa	0-10	Czech Republic	F/5	Estadio Héctor Espino	1:30	104	Boxscore

== Final round ==
=== Bronze medal game ===
September 5, 2022	Japan	0 – 7	Chinese Taipei
September 5, 2022		Boxscore

=== Gold medal game ===
September 5, 2022	Cuba	3 – 4	United States
September 5, 2022		Boxscore

== Final standings ==
Rk	Team
1st place, gold medalist(s)	United States
2nd place, silver medalist(s)	Cuba
3rd place, bronze medalist(s)	Chinese Taipei
4	Japan
5	Puerto Rico
6	Panama
7	Mexico
8	Venezuela
9	Colombia
10	Czech Republic
11	France
12	Guam
13	South Africa

== Awards ==
The WBSC announced the following awards at the completion of the tournament.

Awards	Player
Most Valuable Player	(United States) Coy James

Position	Player
Pitcher	(Chinese Taipei) Yao-Yun Chang (Panama) Daniel Reyes
Hitter	(United States) Andrew Costello
Catcher	(Cuba) Yaider Ruiz
First Base	(Japan) Kanta Kanemoto
Second Base	(Chinese Taipei) Tien-Szu Huang
Third Base	(Cuba) Alejandro Cruz
Short Stop	(United States) Ethan Holliday
Outfield	(Puerto Rico) Isaac Carrasquillo
Outfield	(United States) Coy James
Outfield	(Panama) Juan Caballero
