= United States national under-15 baseball team =

USA national U-15 baseball team

Information
- Country: United States
- Federation: USA Baseball
- Confederation: WBSC Americas

Uniforms
Home	Away	Alternate

Medal record

U-15 World Cup
Gold medal – first place	1998 Fairview Heights	
Gold medal – first place	2001 Monterrey	
Gold medal – first place	2003 Kaohsiung	
Gold medal – first place	2009 Taichung	
Gold medal – first place	2011 Mexico	
Gold medal – first place	2018 Panama	
Gold medal – first place	2022 Sonora	
Gold medal – first place	2026 Mérida	
Silver medal – second place	2005 Mazatlán	
Silver medal – second place	2014 Baja California Sur	
Bronze medal – third place	1995 Londrina	
Bronze medal – third place	2016 Iwaki	

The United States national under-15 baseball team is the national under-15 baseball team of United States in international-level baseball competitions. The team have won the U-15 Baseball World Cup and its predecessor tournaments a total of eight times, recently in 2026.

== Roster ==
The current 15U national team roster in 2026.

United States roster – 2026 15U National Team roster
Players		Coaches
Pitchers: Lathan Boddie; Nate Handley-White; Max Kimbrell; Michael Ohman; Noah Osterman; Braylon Rogers	Catchers: Bryant Ju; Jackson McAneeley; Jacob Reyes; Chris Worrell Jr.; Infielders: Jaxxon Hanen; Paris Head; Paxton Scoggin; Brandon Sweeney; Noah Vrzal; Greyson Wuis; Outfielders: Mattias Di Maggio; Tyler Early; Raylen Hunter; Calvin Madenspacher	Manager: Casey Scott; Coaches: Drew Briese; Steve Butler; JD Pruitt
Updated:September 19, 2026

== Competitive record ==
=== U-15 World Cup ===
U-15 Baseball World Cup record
Year	Result	Position	Pld	W	L	%	RS	RA
(Japan) 1989	Preliminary round	5th	6	2	4	.333	24	29
(Mexico) 1990	Did not participate							
(Australia) 1991	Did not participate							
(Brazil) 1993	Did not participate							
(Mexico) 1994	Did not participate							
(Brazil) 1995	Third place	3rd						
(Japan) 1996	First round	8th						
(Taiwan) 1997	Super round	5th						
(United States) 1998	Champions	1st						
(Mexico) 2001	Champions	1st						
(Taiwan) 2003	Champions	1st						
(Mexico) 2005	Runner-up	2nd						
(Venezuela) 2007	IBAF withdrew its sanction of the tournament							
(Taiwan) 2009	Champions	1st	8	8	0	1.000	115	28
(Mexico) 2011	Champions	1st	8	7	1	.875	117	49
(Mexico) 2012	Did not participate							
(Mexico) 2014	Runner-up	2nd	10	9	1	.900	107	29
(Japan) 2016	Third place	3rd	9	7	2	.778	85	30
(Panama) 2018	Champions	1st	9	8	1	.889	88	13
(Mexico) 2020	Cancelled due to the COVID-19 pandemic							
(Mexico) 2022	Champions	1st	9	8	1	.889	99	30
(Colombia) 2024	Did not participate							
(Mexico) 2026	Champions	1st	9	8	1	.889	68	21
Total	8 Titles	15/23						
