= 2007 Baseball World Cup =

2007 amateur baseball competition

Tournament details
- Country: Taiwan
- Venue(s): 5 (in 4 host cities)
- Dates: 6–18 November
- Teams: 18
- Defending champions: Cuba

Final positions
- Champions: United States (3rd title)
- Runners-up: Cuba
- Third place: Japan
- Fourth place: Netherlands

Tournament statistics
- Games played: 68

Awards
- MVP: (United States) Jayson Nix

The 2007 Baseball World Cup (BWC) was the 37th international Men's amateur baseball tournament. The tournament was sanctioned by the International Baseball Federation, which titled it the Amateur World Series from the 1938 tournament through the 1986 AWS. The tournament was held, for the second time, in Taiwan (which played as Chinese Taipei), from November 6 to 18. The United States defeated Cuba in the final, winning its third title.

There were 18 participating countries, split into two groups, with the first four of each group qualifying for the finals. Games were played in four cities: Taichung City (at Taichung Intercontinental Baseball Stadium and Taichung Baseball Field); Taipei City (at Tianmu Baseball Stadium); New Taipei City (Xinzhuang Baseball Stadium; and Yunlin (Douliu Baseball Stadium).

At one time, Venezuela’s participation was in question due to possible sanctions to be considered by the International Baseball Federation in the wake of their refusal to grant visas to a youth team from Taichung to participate in the Youth World Baseball championships in August, 2007, but they were allowed to participate. China was originally scheduled to participate in Pool B, but dropped out and was replaced by the Thai national team, who placed fifth behind China at the 2006 Asian Games.

The next two competitions were also held as the BWC tournament, which was replaced in 2015 by the quadrennial WBSC Premier12.

== Group A ==
=== Table ===
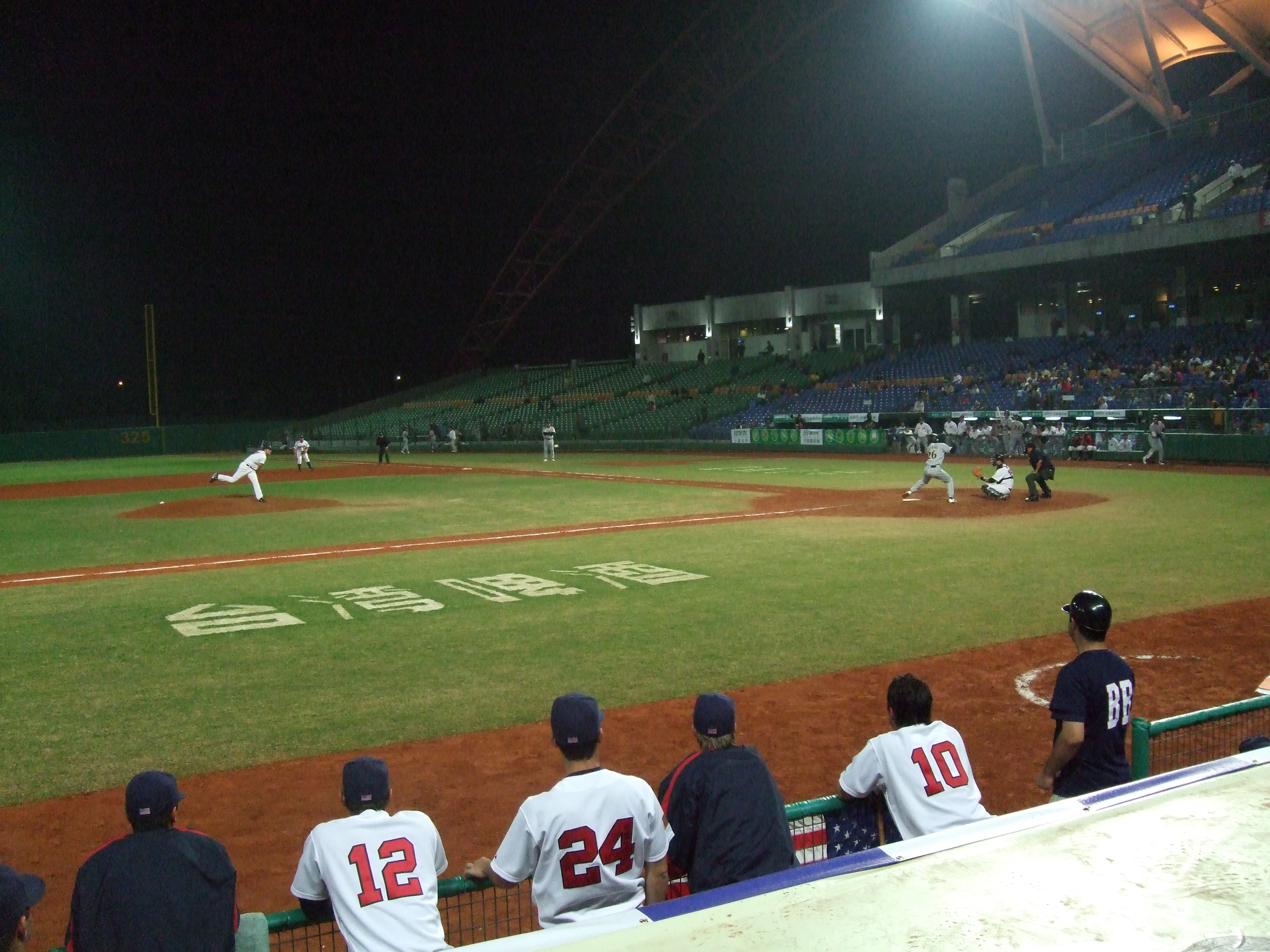

Pool A
Rank	Team	Wins	Losses	Runs Allowed	Run Ratio
1	United States	6	1	18	2.70
2	Chinese Taipei	5	2	25	3.69
3	Japan	5	2	20	3.16
4	Mexico	4	3	32	5.24
5	Panama	3	4	39	5.85
6	Italy	3	4	31	4.73
7	Spain	1	6	63	9.00
8	South Africa	0	7	72	11.57

- ^1 Chinese Taipei is the official IBAF designation for the team representing the state officially referred to as the Republic of China, more commonly known as Taiwan. (See also political status of Taiwan for details.)
- ^2 The IBAF, in agreement with the IBAF Executive Committee, has ruled on Panama starting play with five players without insurance cover on Nov. 7 and 8 during the 37th Baseball World Cup:
  1. These five players were not eligible to play in the Games #3 and #11.
  2. The Panama team must forfeit both Games #3 and #11.
  3. The official result for Game #3 will be Spain 9, Panama 0.
  4. The official result for Game #11 will be USA 9, Panama 0.
  5. The official record and final standings will reflect these changes.

=== Schedule ===
With the exception of the opening game of the tournament, all group A games are played at Taichung Baseball Field, Taichung Intercontinental Baseball Stadium and Douliu Baseball Stadium.

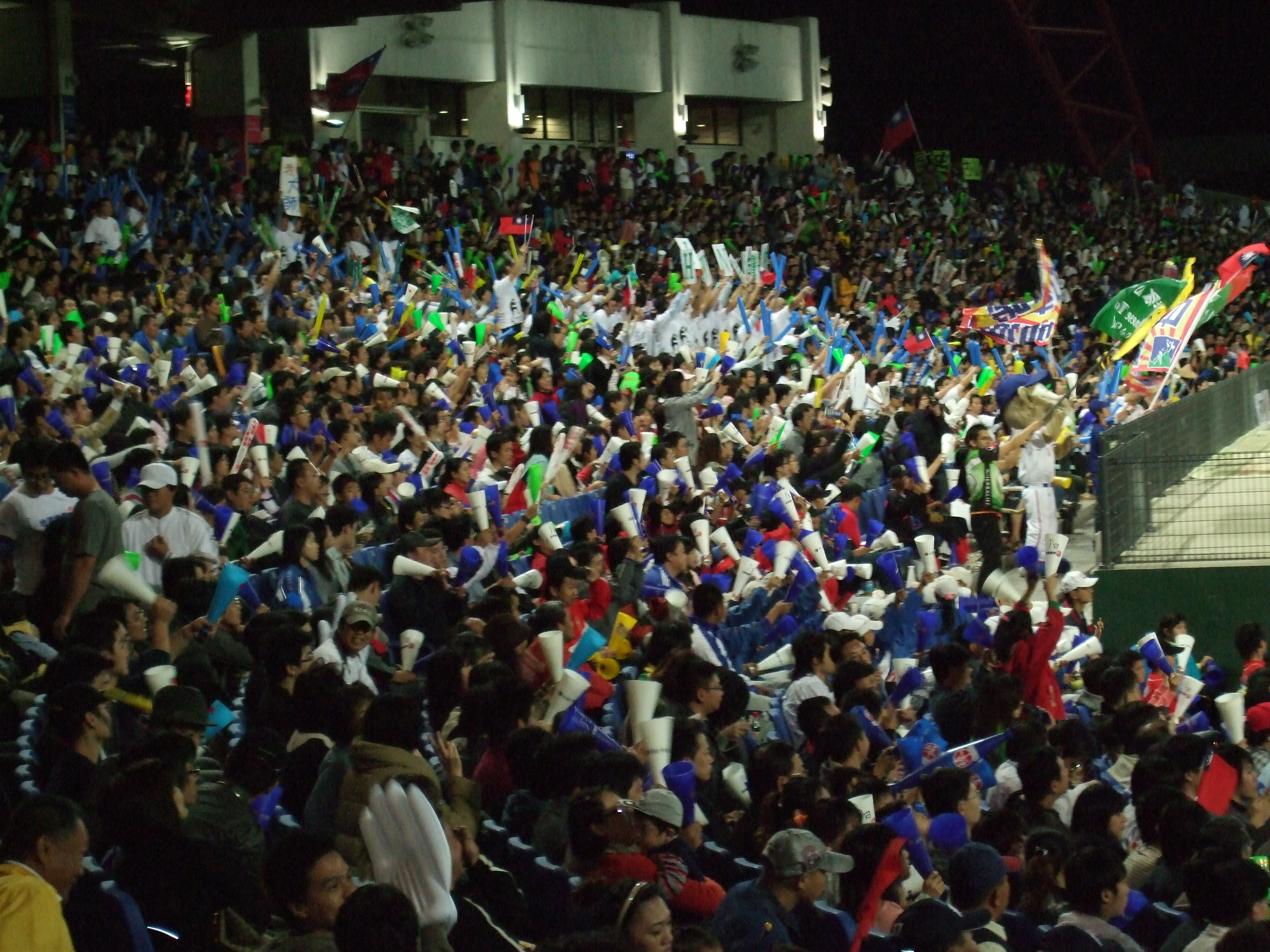
The local crowd celebrates as Chinese Taipei defeat the visitors from Japan 6-1 in the opening round of the 2007 Baseball World Cup

Team 1		Team 2	Time (Venue)
November 7
Spain	0-5	Panama	12:00 Intercontinental
South Africa	1-11	Japan	15:00 Taichung
Mexico	0-3	United States	18:00 Intercontinental
November 8
Italy	11-1	Spain	12:00 Taichung
United States	7-0	Panama	12:00 Intercontinental
Japan	15-3	Mexico	18:00 Taichung
South Africa	1-16	Chinese Taipei	18:00 Intercontinental
November 9
Italy	6-2	United States	12:00 Taichung
Spain	7-4	South Africa	12:00 Intercontinental
Panama	3-2	Mexico	18:00 Taichung
Chinese Taipei	6-1	Japan	18:00 Intercontinental
November 10
Spain	4-8	Chinese Taipei	12:00 Intercontinental
Mexico	13-3	South Africa	12:00 Taichung
Italy	0-6	Panama	18:00 Taichung
United States	5-1	Japan	18:00 Intercontinental
November 11
South Africa	0-8	Italy	12:00 Taichung
Chinese Taipei	5-9	Mexico	12:00 Intercontinental
Spain	2-12	United States	18:00 Taichung
Japan	6-2	Panama	18:00 Intercontinental
November 12
Chinese Taipei	1-0	Italy	18:00 Tianmu
November 13
United States	4-2	South Africa	12:00 Taichung
Italy	0-10	Japan	18:00 Douliu
Mexico	19-1	Spain	18:00 Taichung
Panama	0-10	Chinese Taipei	18:00 Intercontinental
November 14
Japan	4-3	Spain	12:00 Taichung
Mexico	11-2	Italy	12:00 Intercontinental
Panama	13-3	South Africa	18:00 Taichung
Chinese Taipei	7-10	United States	18:00 Intercontinental

== Group B ==
=== Table ===
Pool B
Rank	Team	Wins	Losses	Runs Allowed	Run Ratio
1	Cuba	6	1	13	1.95
2	Australia	6	1	20	2.81
3	Netherlands	5	2	22	3.30
4	South Korea	4	3	17	2.55
5	Canada	4	3	22	3.36
6	Venezuela	2	5	37	5.55
7	Germany	1	6	52	7.80
8	Thailand	0	7	108	20.68

=== Schedule ===
All group B games are played either at Tienmu Baseball Stadium in Taipei City or at Xinzhuang Baseball Stadium in Taipei County.

Team 1		Team 2	Time (Venue)
November 7
Cuba	3-2	Australia	12:00 Tianmu
Netherlands	16-0	Thailand	12:00 Xinzhuang
South Korea	5-0	Canada	18:00 Tianmu
Germany	0-8	Venezuela	18:00 Xinzhuang
November 8
Venezuela	0-4	South Korea	12:00 Tianmu
Thailand	0-18	Canada	12:00 Xinzhuang
Australia	4-3	Netherlands	18:00 Tianmu
Germany	3-7	Cuba	18:00 Xinzhuang
November 9
South Korea	18-2	Thailand	12:00 Tianmu
Australia	7-4	Venezuela	12:00 Xinzhuang
Netherlands	15-5	Germany	18:00 Tianmu
Cuba	6-3	Canada	18:00 Xinzhuang
November 10
Venezuela	4-7	Netherlands	12:00 Tianmu
Canada	10-0	Germany	12:00 Xinzhuang
Cuba	7-2	South Korea	18:00 Tianmu
Thailand	1-26	Australia	18:00 Xinzhuang
November 11
Australia	2-1	South Korea	12:00 Tianmu
Netherlands	1-7	Canada	12:00 Xinzhuang
Germany	2-0	Thailand	18:00 Tianmu
Venezuela	0-10	Cuba	18:00 Xinzhuang
November 13
Thailand	1-11	Cuba	12:00 Tianmu
Australia	4-2	Germany	12:00 Xinzhuang
Canada	6-3	Venezuela	18:00 Tianmu
South Korea	1-5	Netherlands	18:00 Xinzhuang
November 14
Cuba	1-2	Netherlands	12:00 Tianmu
Germany	1-8	South Korea	12:00 Xinzhuang
Canada	6-7	Australia	18:00 Tianmu
Venezuela	17-3	Thailand	18:00 Xinzhuang

== Knockout rounds ==
Quarter-finals
November 16 18:00 (Xinzhuang)
United States	3
South Korea	1
November 16 12:00 (Tianmu)
Chinese Taipei	3
Netherlands	6
November 16 12:00 (Xinzhuang)
Australia	0
Japan	3
November 16 18:00 (Tianmu)
Cuba	6
(Mexico) México	0

Semi-finals
November 17 18:00 (Tianmu)
United States	5
Netherlands	0
November 17 18:00 (Xinzhuang)
Japan	3
Cuba	5

Final
November 18 16:30 (Tianmu)
United States	6
Cuba	3
Third place
November 18 10:00 (Tianmu)
Netherlands	0
Japan	5

5th to 8th
November 17 12:00 (Tianmu)
Chinese Taipei	0
South Korea	3
November 17 12:00 (Xinzhuang)
Australia	7
Mexico	1

5th
November 18 13:00 (Xinzhuang)
South Korea	5
Australia	2
7th
November 18 09:00 (Xinzhuang)
Chinese Taipei	4
Mexico	6

== Final standings ==
Pos	Team	W	L
Gold medal	United States	9	1
Silver medal	Cuba	8	2
Bronze medal	Japan	7	3
4	Netherlands	6	4
5	South Korea	6	4
6	Australia	7	3
7	Mexico	5	5
8	Chinese Taipei	5	5
9	Canada	4	3
10	Panama	3	4
11	Italy	3	4
12	Venezuela	2	5
13	Germany	1	6
14	Spain	1	6
15	South Africa	0	7
16	Thailand	0	7

== Awards ==
The IBAF announced the following awards at the completion of the tournament.

All Star Team
Position	Player
Catcher	(Netherlands) Sidney de Jong
First Base	(Japan) Yasuyuki Saigo
Second Base	(United States) Jayson Nix
Third Base	(Mexico) Efren Rodriguez Espinosa
Short Stop	(South Korea) Sohn Si-Hun
Outfield	(Australia) Trent Oeltjen
Outfield	(Cuba) Frederich Cepeda
Outfield	(United States) Colby Rasmus
Designated Hitter	(Italy) Max di Biase

Tournament Awards
Award	Player
MVP	(United States) Jayson Nix
Batting Award	(Australia) Trent Oeltjen
Fielding Award	(Netherlands) Hainley Statia
Pitching Award	(Japan) Tadashi Settsu (Cuba) Aroldis Chapman

== See also ==
- List of sporting events in Taiwan
