= Estadio Fernando Valenzuela =

Baseball stadium in Hermosillo, Sonora, Mexico

Coordinates: 29.063569444444°N 111.05151388889°W

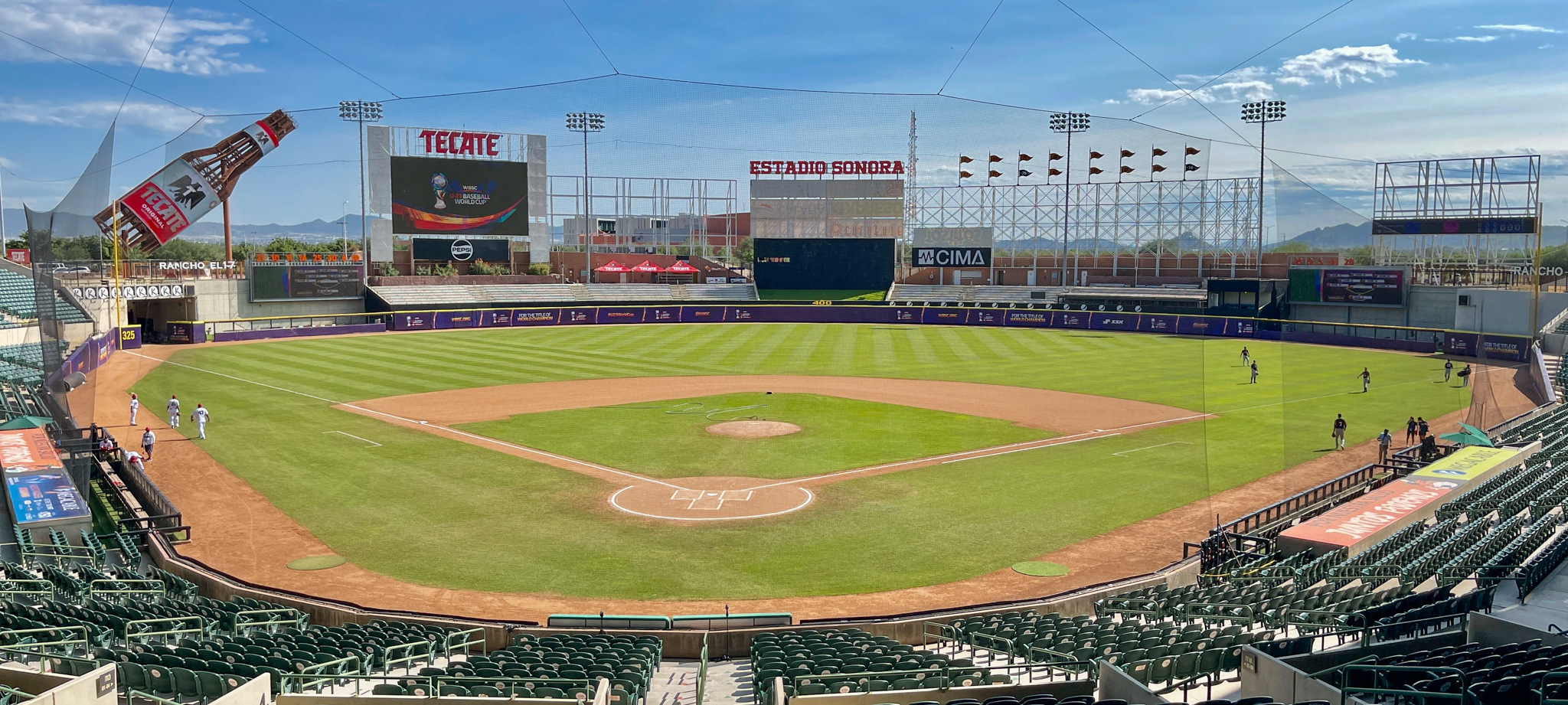
- Panoramic view of the stadium in 2021
- Interactive map of Estadio Fernando Valenzuela
- Former names: Estadio Sonora (2013–2023)
- Location: Hermosillo, Mexico
- Capacity: 16,000
- Surface: Natural Grass
- Field size: Left Field 325 ft Center Field 400 ft Right Field 325 ft m

Construction
- Opened: 1 February 2013

Tenant
- Naranjeros de Hermosillo (LMP) (2013–present)

Estadio Fernando Valenzuela is a baseball stadium located in Hermosillo, Sonora, Mexico. It is home to the Naranjeros de Hermosillo of the Mexican Pacific League.

The stadium, constructed at a cost of $30 million, opened as Estadio Sonora in 2013 and replaced the Estadio Héctor Espino as the home ballpark of the Naranjeros. The creative process for designing the stadium, which was made to mimic the nearby Pinacate Peaks, was approved by the management of the Arizona Diamondbacks, who have played exhibition games at Estadio Héctor Espino.

The stadium received the ArchDaily building of the year award in 2017 for sports architecture.

In December 2020, the stadium's broadcast booth was named in honor of announcer Manuel Torres, who was the announcer in Hermosillo for fifty years.

On 7 February 2023, Governor Alfonso Durazo announced that the stadium would be renamed in honor of Sonora native Fernando Valenzuela, who played for 17 seasons in the MLB and had his number retired by the Los Angeles Dodgers. The named change officially went into effect the following month. Fernando Valenzuela, accompanied by Erubiel Durazo, threw a ceremonial pitch to inaugurate the stadium's new name in December of the same year.

== Events ==
Soon after opening, the Estadio Sonora hosted the 2013 Caribbean Series. It also hosted the 2020 U-23 Baseball World Cup and the 2022 U-15 Baseball World Cup.
