= Manuel Torres (sportscaster) =

Mexican sportscaster (1941–2021)

- Torres in 2020
- Born: 1941; Ures, Sonora, Mexico
- Died: 26 March 2021 (aged 80); Hermosillo, Sonora, Mexico
- Education: Universidad de Sonora
- Awards: Premio Fray Nano (2002)
- Sports commentary career
- Team: Naranjeros de Hermosillo
- Genre: Play-by-play
- Sport: Baseball

Manuel Torres Rivera (1941 – 26 March 2021) was a Mexican baseball broadcaster, public address announcer, writer, and manager. He served as the official voice and master of ceremonies for the Naranjeros de Hermosillo of the Mexican Pacific League for over 50 years from 1970 until his death in 2021.

In addition to his work with the Naranjeros, Torres was a longtime sportswriter who served as the first president of the Asociación de Cronistas Deportivos de Sonora (Sonora Sportswriters Association) in 2000 and won the Premio Fray Nano in 2002. He also co-hosted a radio show dedicated to the Liga del Río Sonora, where he won a league title as a manager in the 1970s.

Torres was inducted into the Salón de la Fama del Deportista Sonorense (Sonoran Athlete's Hall of Fame) in 2022.

== Biography ==
Torres was born in 1941 in Ures, Sonora, and grew up as a baseball fan. He studied law at the Universidad Autónoma de Guadalajara, but returned to Sonora due to personal circumstances, where he finished his studies at the Universidad de Sonora. However, Torres never practiced law, instead pursuing his passion for sports. He began his broadcasting career in 1964, when he was hired at KEVT, a radio station in the Tucson, Arizona, area. The following year, Torres moved to XEPB in Hermosillo, where he worked for over two decades. In 1967 he took over a show called "El Mundo de los Deportes", which he originally co-hosted with Carlos Vázquez Castro. Torres also served as manager of the Medias Rojas de Ures of the Liga del Río Sonora in the 1970s, leading them to a league title in 1974.

Torres was hired by the Naranjeros de Hermosillo of the Mexican Pacific League in 1970 as "coordinator of local sound". His career with the team spanned three different stadiums: the final years at the Estadio Fernando M. Ortiz, followed by 40 years at the Estadio Héctor Espino and the first seven years at the Estadio Sonora. Torres remained with the Naranjeros through the end of the 2020–21 season. Among other sports, he also covered horse racing and softball, including the inaugural 1966 Men's Softball World Championship.

In October 2010, the Naranjeros honored Torres by naming the broadcast booth at Estadio Héctor Espino after him, and he threw out the ceremonial first pitch in a game against the Tomateros de Culiacán. He received a similar honor in December 2020, when the booth at the Estadio Sonora was named after him in celebration of 50 years with the team and he threw the first pitch to Naranjeros catcher César Salazar. Torres' voice was described as always elegant, unrivaled, powerful, and friendly. He also emceed the inaugurations of 40 editions of the Campeonato de Beisbol Infantil de las Américas (Youth Baseball Championship of the Americas) and 19 editions of the Sonora state baseball championships, both organized by El Imparcial, and was the official voice of the Mexican Baseball Fiesta in Arizona.

Torres was a longtime sports columnist for El Sonorense and El Independiente. He served as the first president of the Asociación de Cronistas Deportivos de Hermosillo (Hermosillo Sportswriters Association) in 1987 and first president of the Asociación de Cronistas Deportivos de Sonora (Sonora Sportswriters Association) in 2000. Torres was awarded the Premio Fray Nano by the Federación Mexicana de Cronistas Deportivos (Mexican Sportswriters Federation) in 2002 to commemorate his 30 years as a sportswriter. He was also a longtime supporter and promoter of the Liga del Río Sonora, co-hosting a radio show on Radio Ures exclusively dedicated to the league. Outside of sports, Torres served as the cronista of his native Ures Municipality from 1991 until 2021.

Torres died on 26 March 2021 in Hermosillo. He was honored by the Naranjeros with a minute of applause ahead of the team's 2022–23 season opener. Torres was inducted unanimously into the Salón de la Fama del Deportista Sonorense (Sonoran Athlete's Hall of Fame) as a member of the class of 2022.
