= 2018 U-15 Baseball World Cup =

Tournament details
- Country: Panama
- Dates: 10–19 August
- Teams: 12

Final positions
- Champions: United States (6th title)
- Runners-up: Panama
- Third place: Chinese Taipei
- Fourth place: Japan

Awards
- MVP: (United States) Cody Schrier

The 2018 U-15 Baseball World Cup or the IV U-15 Baseball World Cup was an under-15 international baseball competition held in David and Chitré, Panama from August 10 to 19, 2018.

The United States won their first world title in the U-15 World Cup history and overall sixth title in the tournaments, after defeated Panama 7–1 in final.

== Teams ==
The following 12 teams qualified for the tournament.

Pool A	Pool B
Brazil	Australia
China	Cuba
Germany	Dominican Republic
Panama	Japan
Chinese Taipei ^{1}	Netherlands
United States	South Africa

^{1}Republic of China, commonly known as Taiwan, due to complicated relations with People's Republic of China, is recognized by the name Chinese Taipei by most of the international organizations in sports competitions. For more information, please see Cross-Strait relations.

== First round ==
- The top three teams in each pool will qualify for the second round.

Qualified for the Super Round
Qualified for the Placement Round

=== Group A ===
Teams	W	L	Pct.	GB	R	RA
United States	4	1	.800	—	50	3
Panama	4	1	.800	—	37	9
Chinese Taipei	4	1	.800	—	28	20
Brazil	2	3	.400	2	22	25
China	1	4	.200	3	7	45
Germany	0	5	.000	4	7	49

Date	Local time	Road team	Score	Home team	Inn.	Venue	Game duration	Attendance	Boxscore
Aug 10, 2018	10:00	Brazil	10–0	Germany	F/6	Estadio Kenny Serracín	2:37		Boxscore
Aug 10, 2018	14:00	China	0–27	United States	F/5	Estadio Kenny Serracín	2:26		Boxscore
Aug 10, 2018	19:00	Chinese Taipei	1–9	Panama		Estadio Kenny Serracín	2:50		Boxscore
Aug 11, 2018	10:00	Germany	0–10	United States	F/5	Estadio Kenny Serracín	1:33		Boxscore
Aug 11, 2018	14:00	Chinese Taipei	9–7	Brazil		Estadio Kenny Serracín	3:37		Boxscore
Aug 11, 2018	18:00	Panama	2–1	China		Estadio Kenny Serracín	2:23		Boxscore
Aug 12, 2018	10:00	United States	1–2	Chinese Taipei		Estadio Kenny Serracín	2:44		Boxscore
Aug 12, 2018	14:00	Germany	4–5	China		Estadio Kenny Serracín	2:22		Boxscore
Aug 12, 2018	18:00	Brazil	3–7	Panama		Estadio Kenny Serracín	3:10		Boxscore
Aug 13, 2018	10:00	China	0–10	Chinese Taipei	F/5	Estadio Kenny Serracín	1:52	101	Boxscore
Aug 14, 2018	09:30	China	1–2	Brazil		Estadio Kenny Serracín	2:05		Boxscore
Aug 14, 2018	13:00	Germany	3–6	Chinese Taipei		Estadio Kenny Serracín	2:27		Boxscore
Aug 14, 2018	17:00	United States	4–1	Panama		Estadio Kenny Serracín	3:06		Boxscore
Aug 15, 2018	09:00	Brazil	0–8	United States		Estadio Kenny Serracín	2:44		Boxscore
Aug 15, 2018	12:30	Panama	18–0	Germany	F/5	Estadio Kenny Serracín	2:03		Boxscore

=== Group B ===
Teams	W	L	Pct.	GB	R	RA
Cuba	5	0	1.000	—		
Japan	4	1	.800	1		
Dominican Republic	3	2	.600	2		
Netherlands	2	3	.400	3		
Australia	1	4	.200	4		
South Africa	0	5	.000	5		

Date	Local time	Road team	Score	Home team	Inn.	Venue	Game duration	Attendance	Boxscore
Aug 10, 2018	10:00	Australia	2–4	Japan		Estadio Rico Cedeño	2:02		Boxscore
Aug 10, 2018	14:00	Netherlands	1–5	Cuba		Estadio Rico Cedeño	2:24		Boxscore
Aug 10, 2018	18:00	Dominican Republic	5–3	South Africa		Estadio Rico Cedeño	2:24		Boxscore
Aug 11, 2018	10:00	Japan	11–1	Netherlands		Estadio Rico Cedeño	2:26		Boxscore
Aug 11, 2018	14:00	South Africa	6–16	Australia	F/6	Estadio Rico Cedeño	2:42		Boxscore
Aug 11, 2018	18:00	Cuba	9–0	Dominican Republic		Estadio Rico Cedeño	2:43		Boxscore
Aug 12, 2018	10:00	Netherlands	18–2	South Africa	F/5	Estadio Rico Cedeño	2:09		Boxscore
Aug 12, 2018	14:00	Dominican Republic	20–8	Australia	F/6	Estadio Rico Cedeño	2:55		Boxscore
Aug 12, 2018	18:00	Cuba	9–7	Japan		Estadio Rico Cedeño	2:55		Boxscore
Aug 13, 2018	10:00	Netherlands	22–7	Australia	F/6	Estadio Rico Cedeño	2:56		Boxscore
Aug 13, 2018	14:00	South Africa	0–10	Cuba	F/5	Estadio Rico Cedeño	2:01		Boxscore
Aug 13, 2018	18:00	Japan	13–7	Dominican Republic		Estadio Rico Cedeño	2:40		Boxscore
Aug 14, 2018	10:00	Australia	3–9	Cuba		Estadio Rico Cedeño	2:18		Boxscore
Aug 14, 2018	14:00	Dominican Republic	11–2	Netherlands		Estadio Rico Cedeño	2:28	200	Boxscore
Aug 14, 2018	18:00	South Africa	0–20	Japan	F/5	Estadio Rico Cedeño	2:02	200	Boxscore

== Super round ==
Qualified for the Final
Qualified for the Third-place game

Teams	W	L	Pct.	GB	R	RA
United States	4	1	.800	–		
Panama	4	1	.800	–		
Japan	2	3	.400	2		
Chinese Taipei	2	3	.400	2		
Cuba	2	3	.400	2		
Dominican Republic	1	4	.200	3		

Date	Local time	Road team	Score	Home team	Inn.	Venue	Game duration	Attendance	Boxscore
Aug 16, 2018	10:00	Chinese Taipei	2–5	Japan		Estadio Kenny Serracín	2:18		Boxscore
Aug 16, 2018	14:00	Dominican Republic	7–13	United States		Estadio Kenny Serracín	2:45		Boxscore
Aug 16, 2018	18:00	Panama	4–2	Cuba		Estadio Kenny Serracín	3:07		Boxscore
Aug 17, 2018	10:00	Chinese Taipei	3–4	Dominican Republic		Estadio Kenny Serracín	1:57		Boxscore
Aug 17, 2018	14:00	United States	10–0	Cuba		Estadio Kenny Serracín	2:33		Boxscore
Aug 17, 2018	18:00	Japan	3–7	Panama		Estadio Kenny Serracín	2:50		Boxscore
Aug 18, 2018	10:00	Chinese Taipei	8–5	Cuba		Estadio Kenny Serracín	2:57		Boxscore
Aug 18, 2018	14:00	Japan	2–8	United States		Estadio Kenny Serracín	2:40		Boxscore
Aug 18, 2018	18:00	Dominican Republic	2–3	Panama		Estadio Kenny Serracín	2:50		Boxscore

== Consolation Round ==
Teams	W	L	Pct.	GB	R	RA
Brazil	5	0	1.000	–		
Netherlands	4	1	.800	1		
Australia	3	2	.600	2		
China	1	4	.200	4		
Germany	1	4	.200	4		
South Africa	1	4	.200	4		

Date	Local time	Road team	Score	Home team	Inn.	Venue	Game duration	Attendance	Boxscore
Aug 16, 2018	10:00	South Africa	5–3	China		Estadio Rico Cedeño	2:32		Boxscore
Aug 16, 2018	14:00	Germany	3–4	Netherlands		Estadio Rico Cedeño	2:34		Boxscore
Aug 16, 2018	18:00	Australia	2–3	Brazil		Estadio Rico Cedeño	2:23		Boxscore
Aug 17, 2018	10:00	Germany	5–0	South Africa		Estadio Rico Cedeño	2:32		Boxscore
Aug 17, 2018	14:00	China	2–9	Australia		Estadio Rico Cedeño	2:12		Boxscore
Aug 17, 2018	18:00	Brazil	11–1	Netherlands	F/5	Estadio Rico Cedeño	1:56		Boxscore
Aug 18, 2018	10:00	Germany	2–8	Australia		Estadio Rico Cedeño	2:07		Boxscore
Aug 18, 2018	14:00	South Africa	0–10	Brazil	F/6	Estadio Rico Cedeño	2:09		Boxscore
Aug 18, 2018	18:00	China	2–6	Netherlands		Estadio Rico Cedeño	2:27		Boxscore

== Final round ==
=== Bronze medal game ===
August 20, 2018	Chinese Taipei	6 – 3	Japan
August 20, 2018		Boxscore

=== Gold medal game ===
August 20, 2018	Panama	1 – 7	United States
August 20, 2018		Boxscore

== Final standings ==
Rk	Team
1st place, gold medalist(s)	United States
2nd place, silver medalist(s)	Panama
3rd place, bronze medalist(s)	Chinese Taipei
4	Japan
5	Cuba
6	Dominican Republic
7	Brazil
8	Netherlands
9	Australia
10	China
11	Germany
12	South Africa

== Awards ==
The WBSC announced the following awards at the completion of the tournament.

Awards	Player
Most Valuable Player	(United States) Cody Schrier
Outstanding Defensive Player	(Chinese Taipei) Kai-Yu Liu

All-World Team
Position	Player
Starting pitcher	(United States) Andrew Painter
Relief pitcher	(Panama) Alexis Bernal
Catcher	(Cuba) Edgar Quero
First base	(United States) Brady House
Second base	(Japan) Seiya Fukuhara
Third base	(United States) Luke Leto
Shortstop	(Panama) Reginald Preciado
Outfield	(Dominican Republic) Oscar Aude
Outfield	(Panama) Luis Durango
Outfield	(United States) Ryan Spikes
Designated hitter	(Japan) Aoi Sugishita
