= Estadio Héctor Espino =

Baseball stadium in Hermosillo, Sonora, Mexico

- El Héctor Espino
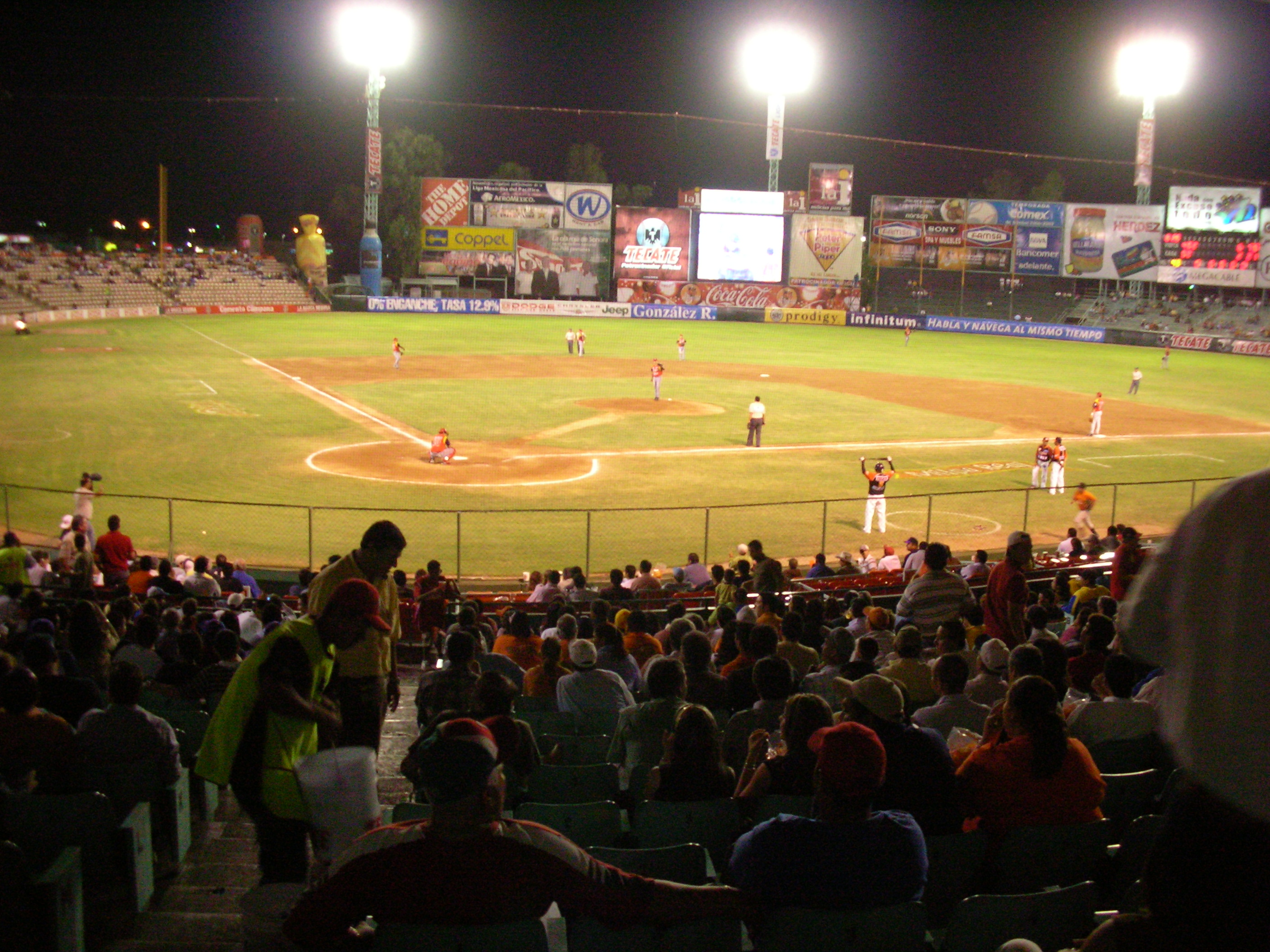
- Interactive map of Estadio Héctor Espino
- Location: Hermosillo, Mexico; Blvd. Solidaridad s/n Col. Pimentel C.P. 83130
- Coordinates: 29°5′48.07″N 110°59′27.53″W
- Capacity: 15,000
- Surface: Natural Grass
- Field size: Left Field 325 ft Center Field 400 ft Right Field 325 ft m

Construction
- Opened: 4 October 1972

Tenants
- Naranjeros de Hermosillo (1972–2013); Cimarrones de Sonora (2013–2015); Diablos de Hermosillo (2015); Coyotes UTH (2017)

The Héctor Espino Baseball Stadium (Estadio de Béisbol Héctor Espino) is a baseball stadium located in Hermosillo, Sonora, Mexico. The field is located in the north side of the city. It was home to the Naranjeros de Hermosillo (Hermosillo Orange Pickers) of the Mexican Pacific League until 2013.

On 4 October 1972, the stadium was opened to the public and originally known as was known as "Coloso del Choyal" or the Choyal Colossus. When first built, the stadium had a capacity of 10,000. It was remodeled in 1997 to hold a capacity of 15,000.

In 1976, the stadium was officially renamed for Héctor Espino, a famous Mexican baseball player. Espino's career spanned 24 seasons, from 1960 to 1984.

The stadium hosted six Caribbean Series in 1974, 1982, 1987, 1992, and 1997. In addition, it hosted eight Arizona Diamondbacks pre-season games from 1998 to 2010. The venue is also utilized for concerts.

The stadium is also the first in Latin America to feature a big screen and a digital LED display scoreboard. Seats are divided in various sections and different prices to accommodate various economic needs. Amenities of the stadium include an extensive food court, souvenir shops, and a state-of-the-art lighting system.

In 2010, the stadium's broadcast booth was named in honor of legendary announcer Manuel Torres.

In 2013, the stadium was replaced by the Estadio Sonora as the home venue of the Naranjeros de Hermosillo. The final Naranjeros game at the stadium was a 7–2 playoff loss to the Tomateros de Culiacán on 6 January 2013.

The stadium served as the first home venue of the Cimarrones de Sonora from 2013 to 2015. The Diablos de Hermosillo of the Liga Norte de México used the stadium as their temporary home venue in 2015, and the Coyotes UTH American football team played in the stadium during their 2017 season.

After several years of abandonment, the stadium was purchased by the federal government in 2019 and finalized the deal in 2020. The stadium underwent partial demolition in April 2021 as the beginning of a renovation project. The site was visited by President Andrés Manuel López Obrador in February 2022.

The stadium hosted the 2022 U-15 Baseball World Cup.
