= Gustavo Campero =

Colombian baseball player (born 1997)

Los Angeles Angels – No. 51
- Outfielder
- Born: September 20, 1997 (age 29); Lorica, Colombia
- Bats: Switch Throws: Right

MLB debut
- September 15, 2024, for the Los Angeles Angels

MLB statistics (through 2026 season)
- Batting average: .217
- Home runs: 4
- Runs batted in: 16
- Stats at Baseball Reference

Teams
- Los Angeles Angels (2024–present)
Medals
Men's baseball
Representing Colombia
U-23 World Cup
Bronze medal – third place	2020 Hermosillo	Team

Gustavo Angel Campero Patrón (born September 20, 1997) is a Colombian professional baseball outfielder for the Los Angeles Angels of Major League Baseball (MLB).

== Professional career ==
=== New York Yankees ===
On July 12, 2016, Campero signed with the New York Yankees as an international free agent. He started his career as a catcher before switching to an outfielder. Campero made his professional debut in 2017, splitting the season between the Dominican Summer League Yankees and rookie-level Gulf Coast League (GCL) Yankees. He returned to the GCL Yankees in 2018, but played in only two games.

Campero spent the 2019 season with the rookie-level Pulaski Yankees, playing in 36 games and batting .293/.374/.414 with two home runs, 12 runs batted in (RBI), and 10 stolen bases. He did not play in a game in 2020 due to the cancellation of the minor league season because of the COVID-19 pandemic.

=== Los Angeles Angels ===
On December 10, 2020, the Angels selected Campero in the minor league phase of the Rule 5 draft. He spent the 2021 campaign with the Single-A Inland Empire 66ers, playing in 41 games and slashing .245/.316/.360 with four home runs, 16 RBI, and eight stolen bases.

Campero began the 2022 season with the Double-A Rocket City Trash Pandas but played in only 6 games. He split 2023 between Rocket City and the High-A Tri-City Dust Devils, accumulating a .330/.408/.632 batting line with 12 home runs, 42 RBI, and 20 stolen bases in 64 games played.

Campero began 2024 with Rocket City and was promoted to the Triple-A Salt Lake Bees in August. On September 15, Campero was selected to the 40-man roster and promoted to the major leagues for the first time. He made his MLB debut that day against the Houston Astros, recording his first career RBI. In 13 games for the Angels, Campero batted .239/.271/.348 with one home run, six RBI, and three stolen bases.

Campero was optioned to Triple-A to begin the 2025 season. On April 29, he was called up to the majors when the Angels designated J. D. Davis for assignment. In 28 games for Los Angeles, he batted .172/.273/.345 with three home runs, eight RBI, and four stolen bases. On August 12, Campero was placed on the injured list due to a high left ankle sprain. He was transferred to the 60-day injured list on September 1, ending his season. Campero was non-tendered by the Angels on November 21, making him a free agent. Five days later, he re-signed with the Angels organization on a minor league contract.

Campero was assigned to Double-A Rocket City to start the 2026 season. On June 6, 2026, the Angels selected Campero's contract and placed him on the injured list due to a broken hand.

== International career ==
Campero has played for the Colombia national team in international competition. He had one single in five plate appearances at the 2023 World Baseball Classic (WBC). Facing Mexico, he hit a ball that shortstop Luis Urías mishandled, allowing Jorge Alfaro to score to give Colombia the lead. Colombia would go on to win 5–4.

Campero batted 1-for-13 in the 2026 WBC with one double and one walk and was caught stealing once.

== See also ==
- Rule 5 draft results
