= 2020 U-23 Baseball World Cup =

Tournament details
- Country: Mexico
- Dates: September 23 – October 2, 2021
- Teams: 12
- Defending champions: Mexico

Final positions
- Champions: Venezuela (1st title)
- Runners-up: Mexico
- Third place: Colombia
- Fourth place: Cuba

Tournament statistics
- Games played: 50
- Attendance: 21,425 (429 per game)

Awards
- MVP: (Colombia) Gustavo Campero

The 2020 U-23 Baseball World Cup, officially III U-23 Baseball World Cup, is the third edition of the U-23 Baseball World Cup tournament, fourth since the tournament's inception in 2014 as the 21U Baseball World Cup. Originally scheduled to take place in 2020, the event was postponed to 2021 as a result of the COVID-19 pandemic. The tournament was held from September 23 to October 2, in Ciudad Obregón and Hermosillo, Mexico, with 12 teams participating.

Consequently, the World Baseball Softball Confederation (WBSC) has expanded the age category to include players up to the age of 24 who would have missed the competition in 2020, and players born from 1997 to 2003 will be eligible to participate.

Venezuela defeated Mexico with a score of 4–0 in the world championship game at Estadio Sonora. Colombia won the bronze medal against Cuba with a 5–3 score.

== Venues ==
This edition was played in two Mexican baseball temples. Estadio Yaquis in Ciudad Obregón hosted Group A and the Placement Round, while Estadio Sonora in Hermosillo hosted Group B, the Super Round, the Bronze Medal Game and the Championship Game.

Ciudad Obregón	Hermosillo
Estadio Yaquis	Estadio Sonora
Capacity: 16,000	Capacity: 16,000
2020 U-23 Baseball World Cup is located in Mexico

== Teams ==
The WBSC World Rankings as of the time of the competition is specified in parentheses.

Asia

Chinese Taipei (3)
South Korea (2)

Europe

Netherlands (8)
Czech Republic (16)
Germany (18)

Americas

Venezuela (10)
Mexico (5)
Colombia (15)
Dominican Republic (6)
Cuba (11)
Nicaragua (14)
Panama (13)

== First round ==
=== Group A ===
Pos	Team	Pld	W	L	RF	RA	PCT	GB	Qualification
1	Mexico (H)	5	4	1	20	8	.800 (Note: Head-to-head result: Mexico 5–0 Cuba)	—	Advance to super round
2	Cuba	5	4	1	25	12	.800	—	Advance to super round
3	Chinese Taipei	5	3	2	17	6	.600	1	Advance to super round
4	Dominican Republic	5	2	3	14	23	.400	2	Advance to consolation round
5	Germany	5	1	4	14	32	.200 (Note: Head-to-head result: Germany 6–4 Czech Republic)	3	Advance to consolation round
6	Czech Republic	5	1	4	11	20	.200	3	Advance to consolation round

Source: WBSC
(H) Hosts
Notes:
- All times are Mountain Standard Time (UTC-07:00).

Date	Local time	Road team	Score	Home team	Inn.	Venue	Game duration	Attendance	Boxscore
Sep 23, 2021	10:30	Germany	0 – 7	Chinese Taipei	F/7	Estadio Yaquis	2:23	100	Boxscore
Sep 23, 2021	19:30	Czech Republic	5 – 1	Mexico	F/7	Estadio Yaquis	2:09	2,223	Boxscore
Sep 24, 2021	10:30	Dominican Republic	8 – 4	Germany	F/7	Estadio Yaquis	2:57	100	Boxscore
Sep 24, 2021	15:00	Czech Republic	1 – 4	Chinese Taipei	F/7	Estadio Yaquis	2:02	78	Boxscore
Sep 24, 2021	19:30	Mexico	5 – 0	Cuba	F/7	Estadio Yaquis	2:09	1,651	Boxscore
Sep 25, 2021	10:30	Germany	6 – 4	Czech Republic	F/7	Estadio Yaquis	2:34	59	Boxscore
Sep 25, 2021	15:00	Chinese Taipei	1 – 2	Cuba	F/7	Estadio Yaquis	2:07	100	Boxscore
Sep 25, 2021	19:30	Mexico	8 – 2	Dominican Republic	F/7	Estadio Yaquis	2:21	2,717	Boxscore
Sep 26, 2021	10:30	Cuba	10 – 3	Germany	F/7	Estadio Yaquis	2:12	78	Boxscore
Sep 26, 2021	15:00	Czech Republic	0 – 2	Dominican Republic	F/7	Estadio Yaquis	2:23	120	Boxscore
Sep 26, 2021	19:30	Chinese Taipei	0 – 3	Mexico	F/7	Estadio Yaquis	2:09	2,177	Boxscore
Sep 27, 2021	10:30	Cuba	7 – 1	Czech Republic	F/7	Estadio Yaquis	2:24	85	Boxscore
Sep 27, 2021	15:00	Dominican Republic	0 – 5	Chinese Taipei	F/7	Estadio Yaquis	2:12	57	Boxscore
Sep 27, 2021	19:30	Germany	1 – 3	Mexico	F/7	Estadio Yaquis	2:08	1,556	Boxscore
Sep 28, 2021	10:30	Cuba	6 – 2	Dominican Republic	F/7	Estadio Yaquis	2:08	48	Boxscore

=== Group B ===
Pos	Team	Pld	W	L	RF	RA	PCT	GB	Qualification
1	Venezuela	5	4	1	23	12	.800 (Note: Head-to-head result: Venezuela 3–2 Colombia)	—	Advance to super round
2	Colombia	5	4	1	34	8	.800	—	Advance to super round
3	Panama	5	3	2	23	21	.600	1	Advance to super round
4	Nicaragua	5	2	3	21	34	.400	2	Advance to consolation round
5	South Korea	5	1	4	18	26	.200 (Note: Head-to-head result: Netherlands 7–8 South Korea)	3	Advance to consolation round
6	Netherlands	5	1	4	16	34	.200	3	Advance to consolation round

Source: WBSC
Notes:
- All times are Mountain Standard Time (UTC-07:00).

Date	Local time	Road team	Score	Home team	Inn.	Venue	Game duration	Attendance	Boxscore
Sep 23, 2021	10:30	Panama	1 – 7	Colombia	F/7	Estadio Sonora	1:55	50	Boxscore
Sep 23, 2021	15:00	Nicaragua	6 – 4	South Korea	F/7	Estadio Sonora	2:52	103	Boxscore
Sep 23, 2021	19:30	Netherlands	4 – 9	Venezuela	F/7	Estadio Sonora	2:20	328	Boxscore
Sep 24, 2021	10:30	Panama	13 – 6	Nicaragua	F/8	Estadio Sonora	3:00	15	Boxscore
Sep 24, 2021	15:00	Netherlands	7 – 8	South Korea	F/8	Estadio Sonora	3:06	32	Boxscore
Sep 24, 2021	19:30	Venezuela	3 – 2	Colombia	F/7	Estadio Sonora	2:33	280	Boxscore
Sep 25, 2021	10:30	South Korea	2 – 5	Panama	F/7	Estadio Sonora	2:21	129	Boxscore
Sep 25, 2021	15:00	Colombia	10 – 0	Netherlands	F/6	Estadio Sonora	1:51	166	Boxscore
Sep 25, 2021	19:30	Venezuela	6 – 3	Nicaragua	F/7	Estadio Sonora	2:22	468	Boxscore
Sep 26, 2021	10:30	Netherlands	4 – 1	Panama	F/7	Estadio Sonora	2:35	133	Boxscore
Sep 26, 2021	15:00	Nicaragua	0 – 10	Colombia	F/6	Estadio Sonora	2:19	266	Boxscore
Sep 26, 2021	19:30	South Korea	0 – 3	Venezuela	F/7	Estadio Sonora	1:55	619	Boxscore
Sep 27, 2021	10:30	Nicaragua	6 – 1	Netherlands	F/7	Estadio Sonora	2:18	37	Boxscore
Sep 27, 2021	15:00	Panama	3 – 2	Venezuela	F/7	Estadio Sonora	1:53	42	Boxscore
Sep 27, 2021	19:30	Colombia	5 – 4	South Korea	F/7	Estadio Sonora	2:41	278	Boxscore

== Consolation round ==
Pos	Team	Pld	W	L	RF	RA	PCT	GB
1	Nicaragua	5	5	0	30	6	1.000	—
2	South Korea	5	4	1	29	17	.800	1
3	Dominican Republic	5	3	2	19	27	.600	2
4	Netherlands	5	2	3	23	26	.400	3
5	Germany	5	1	4	14	29	.200	4
6	Czech Republic	5	0	5	16	26	.000	5

Source: WBSC
- All times are Mountain Standard Time (UTC-07:00).

Date	Local time	Road team	Score	Home team	Inn.	Venue	Game duration	Attendance	Boxscore
Sep 29, 2021	10:30	Netherlands	5 – 2	Germany	F/7	Estadio Yaquis	2:43	45	Boxscore
Sep 29, 2021	15:00	Czech Republic	0 – 3	Nicaragua	F/7	Estadio Yaquis	2:10	82	Boxscore
Sep 29, 2021	19:30	South Korea	10 – 4	Dominican Republic	F/7	Estadio Yaquis	2:44	130	Boxscore
Sep 30, 2021	10:30	Czech Republic	8 – 9	Netherlands	F/7	Estadio Yaquis	3:23	42	Boxscore
Sep 30, 2021	15:00	Germany	1 – 9	South Korea	F/7	Estadio Yaquis	2:14	63	Boxscore
Sep 30, 2021	19:30	Nicaragua	12 – 3	Dominican Republic	F/7	Estadio Yaquis	2:42	71	Boxscore
Oct 1, 2021	10:30	Czech Republic	4 – 6	South Korea	F/7	Estadio Yaquis	2:24	41	Boxscore
Oct 1, 2021	15:00	Netherlands	1 – 2	Dominican Republic	F/7	Estadio Yaquis	2:07	45	Boxscore
Oct 1, 2021	19:30	Germany	1 – 3	Nicaragua	F/7	Estadio Yaquis	1:32	184	Boxscore

== Super round ==
Pos	Team	Pld	W	L	RF	RA	PCT	GB	Qualification
1	Venezuela	5	4	1	28	8	.800	—	Advance to final
2	Mexico (H)	5	3	2	12	11	.600 (Note: Head-to-head result: Colombia 2–3 Mexico)	1	Advance to final
3	Colombia	5	3	2	22	12	.600	1	Advance to third-place game
4	Cuba	5	2	3	12	31	.400 (Note: Head-to-head result: Panama 8–9 Cuba)	2	Advance to third-place game
5	Panama	5	2	3	17	23	.400	2	
6	Chinese Taipei	5	1	4	12	18	.200	3	

Source: WBSC
(H) Hosts
Notes:
- All times are Mountain Standard Time (UTC-07:00).

Date	Local time	Road team	Score	Home team	Inn.	Venue	Game duration	Attendance	Boxscore
Sep 29, 2021	10:30	Chinese Taipei	4 – 5	Colombia	F/7	Estadio Sonora	2:16	38	Boxscore
Sep 29, 2021	15:00	Cuba	0 – 11	Venezuela	F/5	Estadio Sonora	1:48	66	Boxscore
Sep 29, 2021	19:30	Panama	2 – 0	Mexico	F/7	Estadio Sonora	1:59	1,096	Boxscore
Sep 30, 2021	10:30	Cuba	1 – 6	Colombia	F/7	Estadio Sonora	2:44	66	Boxscore
Sep 30, 2021	15:00	Panama	3 – 5	Chinese Taipei	F/7	Estadio Sonora	2:10	66	Boxscore
Sep 30, 2021	19:30	Venezuela	7 – 1	Mexico	F/7	Estadio Sonora	2:18	1,248	Boxscore
Oct 1, 2021	10:30	Panama	8 – 9	Cuba	F/8	Estadio Sonora	2:51	49	Boxscore
Oct 1, 2021	15:00	Chinese Taipei	2 – 5	Venezuela	F/7	Estadio Sonora	2:13	55	Boxscore
Oct 1, 2021	19:30	Colombia	2 – 3	Mexico	F/7	Estadio Sonora	2:03	1,245	Boxscore

== Finals ==
=== Third place game ===
Date	Local time	Road team	Score	Home team	Inn.	Venue	Game duration	Attendance	Boxscore
Oct 2, 2021	13:00	Cuba	3 – 5	Colombia	F/7	Estadio Sonora	2:15	92	Boxscore

=== Championship ===
Date	Local time	Road team	Score	Home team	Inn.	Venue	Game duration	Attendance	Boxscore
Oct 2, 2021	19:30	Mexico	0 – 4	Venezuela	F/7	Estadio Sonora	1:40	2,606	Boxscore

== Final standings ==
Rk	Team	W	L
1st place, gold medalist(s)	Venezuela	8	1
Lost in Final
2nd place, silver medalist(s)	Mexico	5	4
Won in 3rd Place Game
3rd place, bronze medalist(s)	Colombia	6	2
Lost in 3rd Place Game
4	Cuba	5	3
Failed to qualify for the finals
5	Panama	4	4
6	Chinese Taipei	4	4
Failed to qualify for the super round
7	Nicaragua	5	3
8	South Korea	4	4
9	Dominican Republic	3	5
10	Netherlands	3	5
11	Germany	1	7
12	Czech Republic	1	7

2020 U-23 Baseball World Cup

Venezuela
1st title

== U-23 All-World Team ==
Position	Player
C	(Nicaragua) Alvaro Rubi
1B	(Venezuela) Robert Pérez Jr.
2B	(Panama) Adrian Montero
3B	(Nicaragua) Milkar Pérez
SS	(Mexico) Javier Salazar
OF	(Venezuela) Jesus Lujano
OF	(Colombia) Jesús Marriaga
OF	(Colombia) Gustavo Campero
DH	(Panama) Erasmo Caballero
P	(Chinese Taipei) Chen Yu-Hung
P	(Colombia) Jhon Peluffo
