= 1989 World Youth Baseball Championship =

Tournament details
- Country: Japan
- Dates: July- August
- Teams: 8

Final positions
- Champions: Japan (1st title)
- Runners-up: Taiwan
- Third place: China
- Fourth place: South Korea

The 1989 World Youth Baseball Championship was the inaugural edition of the under-15 international baseball competition held in Japan from 24 July to August 1989. Players aged 13 to 15 competed in the eight-nation round-robin tournament.

== Squad ==
=== Brazil ===
- Coach: Huguiyoski Sugeta
- Center fielder: Marcelo Takao Tanaka
- Right fielder: Ricardo Momose

=== Canada ===
- Pitcher: Rob Peronne, Ray Solomon, Kevin Briand, Patrick Lussier, Stephane Chagnon, Martin Lavigne, Mario Rouleau, Patrick Dupuis
- Catcher: Andrew Halpenny, Jamie Dimitroff
- Infielder: Brad Robinson, J. J. Hyde, Neil Szeryk, Jody Brown, Alain Lachance, Pascal St. Pierre
- Outfielder: Louis Lachance, Dominic Therrien, John Evans, Chris Vetor

Two players were excluded from the above roster.

=== China ===
- Gao Lijun

=== Japan ===
- 1st baseman: Kouta Soejima (副島孔太)
- 3rd baseman: Kei Shibata
- Shortstop: Akihito Suzuki (鈴木章仁)
- Ryuichi Sakamoto, Yota Tawa

=== South Korea ===
Incomplete

- Catcher: Chang Sung Kook, Lee Jin Suk

=== Taiwan ===
- Pitcher: 9洪邦政, 林怡宏, 林信助, 陳宗男, 吳俊良 (Wu Chun-liang)
- Catcher: 鄭文賢, 石金受, 王文智
- Infielder: 33陳慶國 (Chen Ching-kuo), 陳懷山, 曾信彰 (Tseng Hsin-chang), 洪啟峰, 陳光輝, 郭子偉
- Outfielder：游明傑, 18龐玉龍, 朱志強, 35藍德威
- Head coach: 陳友彬
- Assistant coaches: 劉明光、蔡景峰

=== United States ===
Incomplete

- Widd Workman, Frank Harmer, Mike Rennack, Chris Smith
- Left fielder: Geoff Jenkins

=== Venezuela ===
Incomplete

- Center fielder: Robert Marcano

== Preliminary round ==
24 July, 1989	South Korea	9 – 6	Japan

25 July, 1989	United States	11 – 2	South Korea

25 July, 1989	Venezuela	4 – 3	Taiwan

25 July, 1989	China	12 – 6	Brazil

25 July, 1989	Japan	8 – 0	Canada

27 July, 1989	Brazil	13 – 1	United States	Yokohama

27 July, 1989	Venezuela	11 – 4	Canada	Yokohama

27 July, 1989	China	10 – 0	Canada	Yokohama

27 July, 1989	Taiwan	6 – 0	China

27 July, 1989	Taiwan	5 – 0	South Korea

29 July, 1989	Venezuela	2 – 1 (11th inning)	South Korea	Jingu Stadium

There is only one game on 29 July. All the other teams were idle.
The records until 27 July was Venezuela 3-0, China and Taiwan 2-1, the United States, Brazil, and Japan 1-1, South Korea 1-3, and Canada 0-3.

30 July, 1989	United States	6 – 2	Venezuela	Tokyo

30 July, 1989	China	5 – 1	United States	Tokyo

The United States became 2-2. The results of the other matches are unknown.

31 July, 1989	Japan	4 – 3	United States	Tokyo Dome

31 July, 1989	Taiwan	11 – 1	Canada	Yokohama

31 July, 1989	Japan	8 – 3	China	Jingu Stadium

31 July, 1989	South Korea	4 – 2	Brazil

Only Venezuela was ideal on 31 July.
After the matches of 31 July, the records are Japan and Taiwan 4-1, Venezuela and China 3-2, South Korea 3-3, the United States 2-3, Brazil 1-3, and Canada 0-5.

2 Aug, 1989	Taiwan	3 – 2	United States

2 Aug, 1989	Japan	4 – 1	Brazil

2 Aug, 1989	Brazil	4 – 3	Venezuela

2 Aug, 1989	China	8 – 2	Venezuela

2 Aug, 1989	South Korea	9 – 1 or 3	China

The Boston Globe report is at 9 - 3, but South China Morning Post as 9 - 1.

Some games were postponed by rain and later canceled because they would not affect teams' placing.
After the end of the round-robin matches, the records are Japan and Taiwan 5-1, China and Korea 4-3, Venezuela 3-4, the United States and Brazil 2-4, and Canada 0=5.

== Placement matches ==
The matches were held at 10:00 at Jingu Stadium

3rd-place match

Aug ?, 1989	China	4 – 3	South Korea	Jingu Stadium

Final

Aug 3, 1989	Japan	5 – 4	Taiwan

== Final standings ==
Rank	Team
Gold medal	Japan
Silver medal	Taiwan
Bronze medal	China
4	South Korea
5	Venezuela
5	United States
7	Brazil
8	Canada

== All-Star Team ==
- Right-handed pitcher: Wu Chun-liang (吳俊良) (TWN)
- Left-handed pitcher: Gao Lijun (CHN)
- Catcher: Chang Sung Kook (장성국) (KOR)
- 1st baseman: Kouta Soejima (JPN) (副島孔太)
- 2nd baseman: Tseng Hsin-chang (TWN) (曾信彰)
- 3rd baseman: Kei Shibata (JPN)
- Shortstop: Akihito Suzuki (JPN) (鈴木章仁)
- Center fielder: Marcelo Takao Tanaka (BRA)
- Right fielder: Ricardo Momose (BRA)
- Left fielder: Geoff Jenkins (USA)
