= 2006 Intercontinental Cup (baseball) =

The 2006 IBAF Intercontinental Cup was held in Taichung, Taiwan from November 9–19. Eight countries contested the tournament, which was played at Taichung Baseball Field and the newly built Taichung Intercontinental Baseball Stadium. The participating countries were Cuba, Australia, Italy, the Netherlands, Japan, South Korea, and the Philippines in addition to the hosts from Chinese Taipei (Taiwan). The tournament was sanctioned by the International Baseball Federation.

== Round robin ==
The eight teams played a round-robin format.

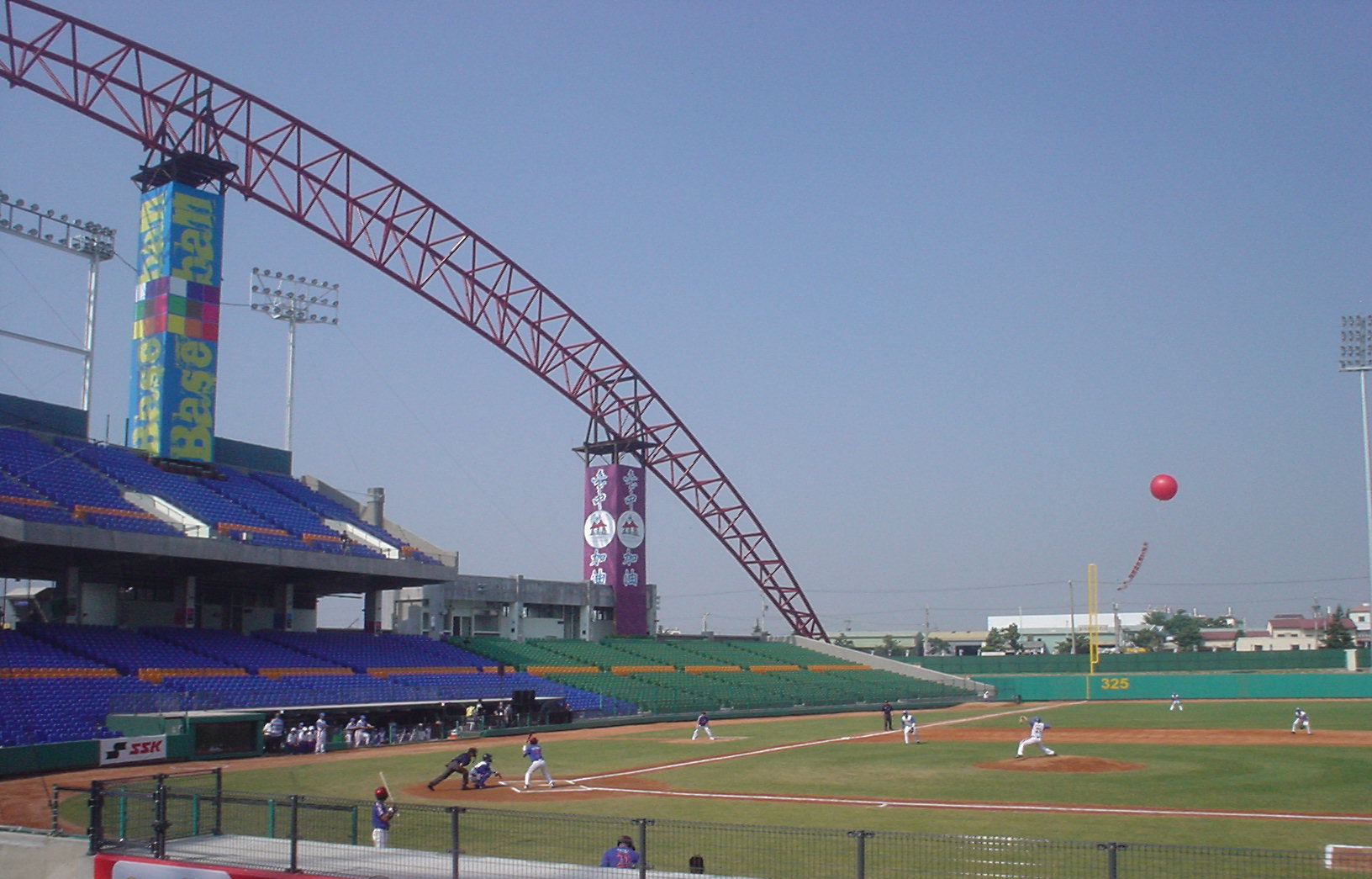
First pitch in a competitive game at the stadium in a game between the Philippines and South Korea in the 2006 Intercontinental Cup

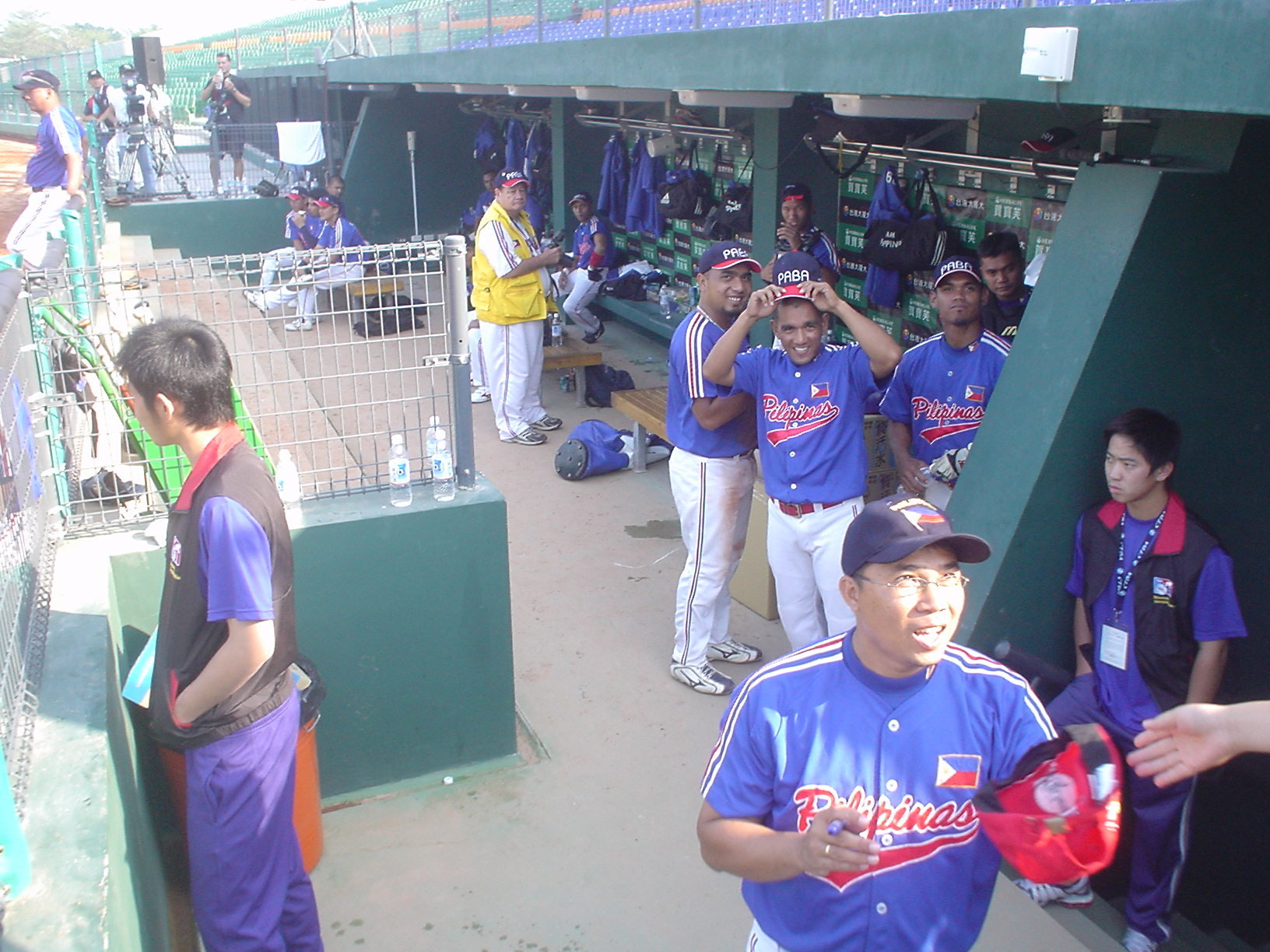
A look in the Philippine dugout during the game against South Korea on November 9

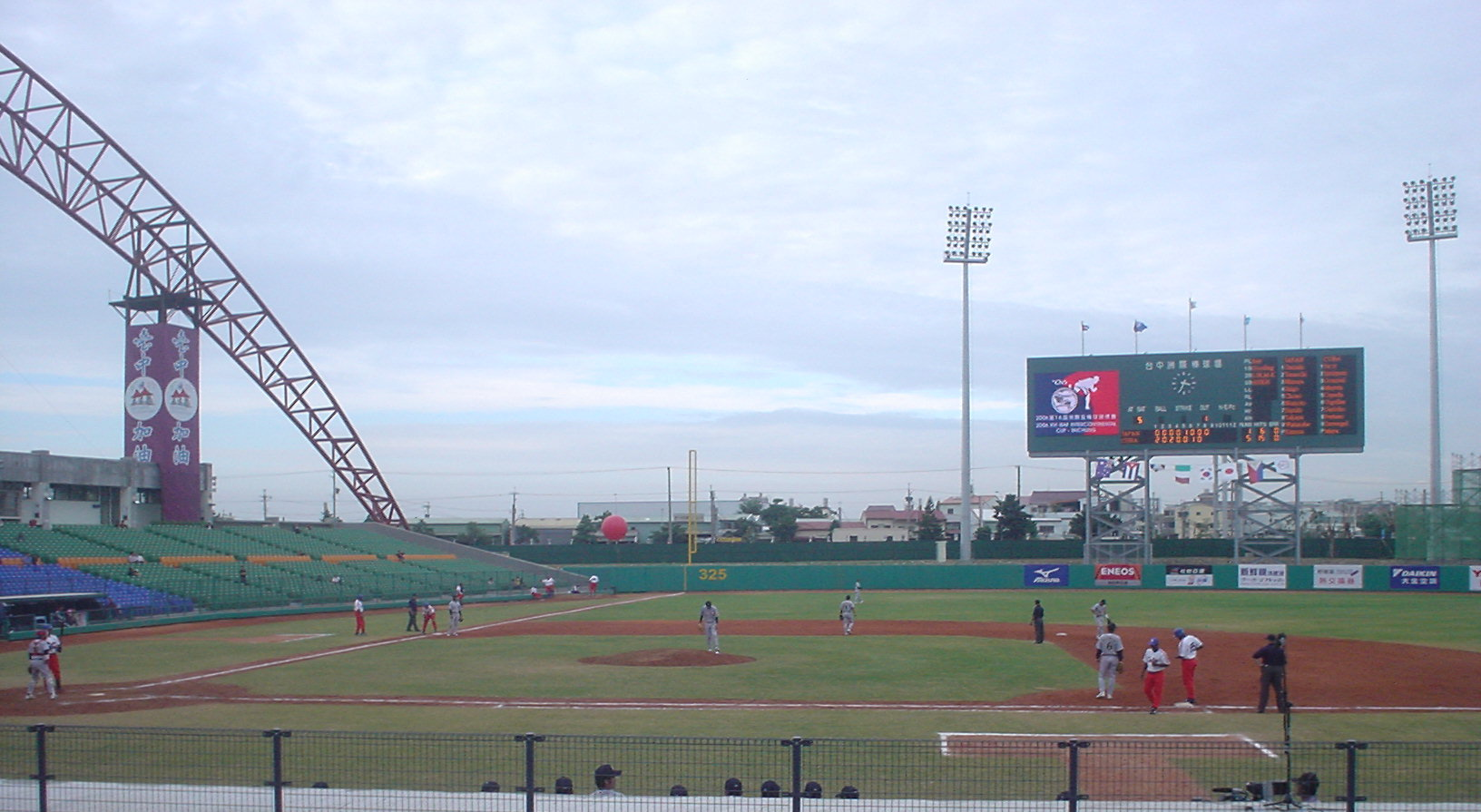
Japan v. Cuba

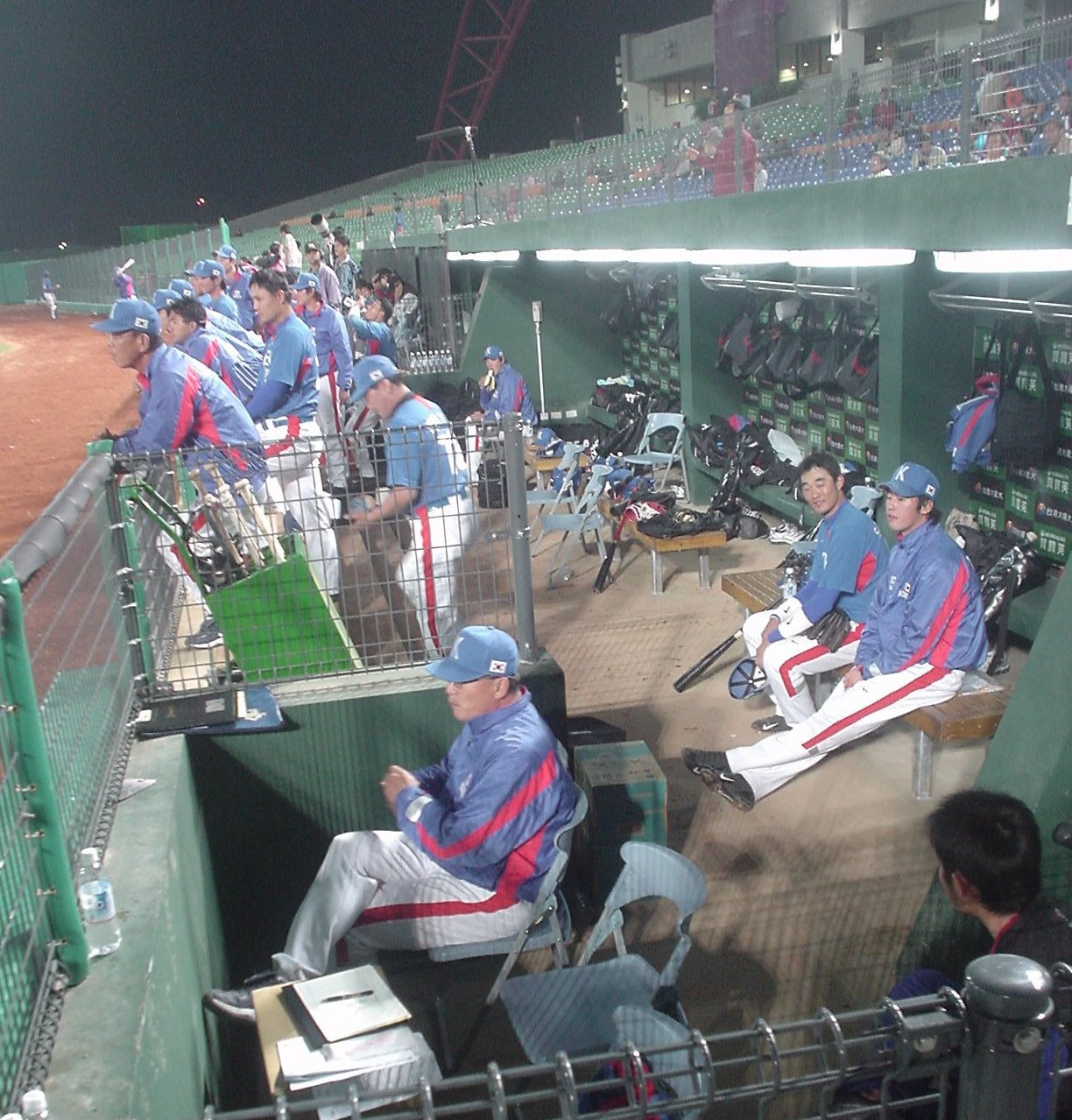
A look inside the Korean dugout

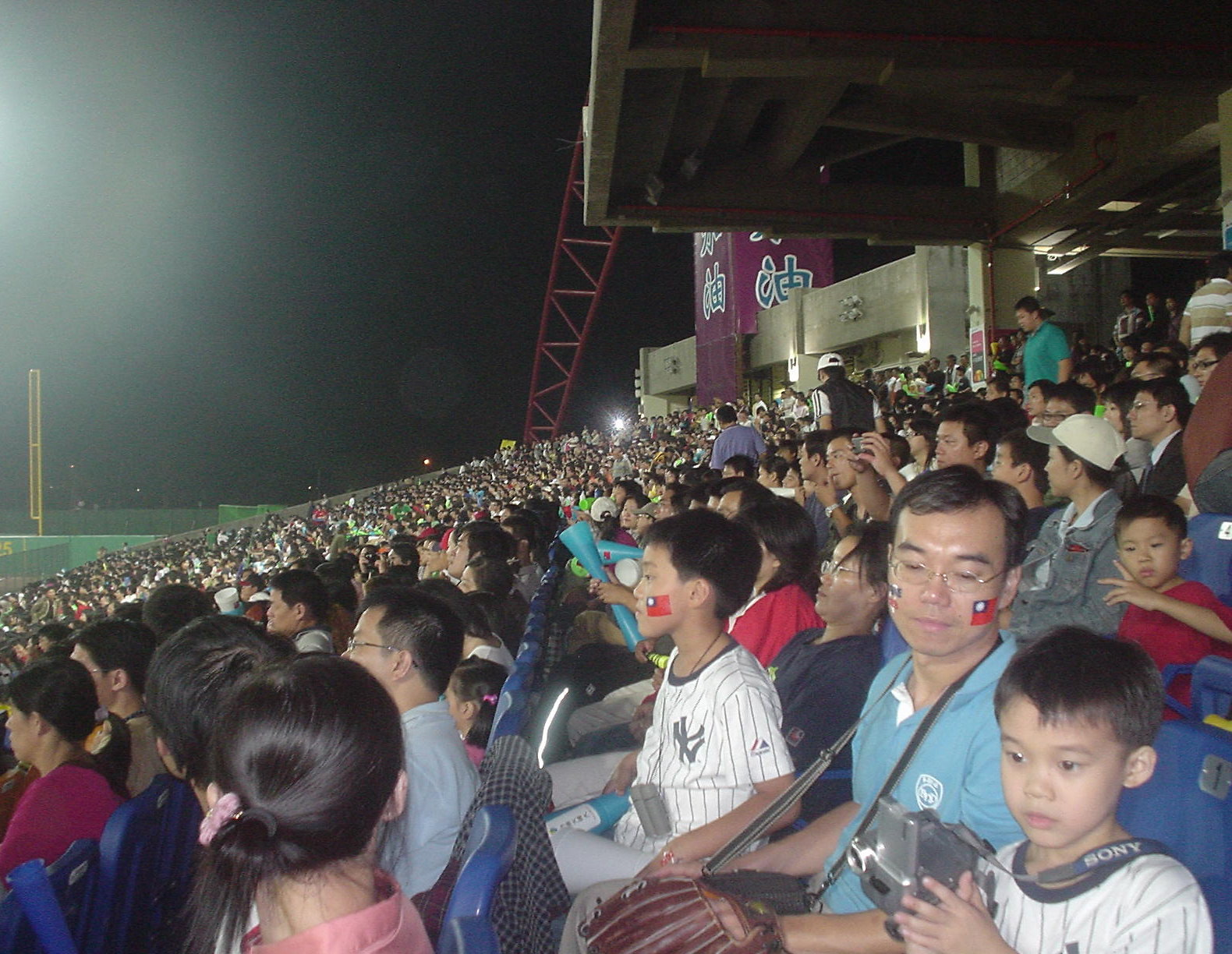
Taiwanese fans before a game.

Date	Time	Venue	Home		Guest		Result
11/9	10:00	TF	Cuba		The Netherlands		3-2
11/9	13:00	IBC	South Korea		The Philippines		10-0 (6½ innings)
11/9	14:00	TF	Australia		Japan		3-4 (10 innings)
11/9	19:30	IBC	Chinese Taipei (Taiwan)	Chinese Taipei for Olympic games	Italy		3-13
11/10	13:00	IBC	The Philippines		Australia		2-12 (8 innings)
11/10	13:00	TF	South Korea		Cuba		1-8
11/10	18:30	IBC	Japan		Chinese Taipei (Taiwan)	Chinese Taipei for Olympic games	4-3
11/10	18:30	TF	The Netherlands		Italy		10-8
11/11	13:00	IBC	Italy		Cuba		0-9
11/11	13:00	TF	Chinese Taipei (Taiwan)	Chinese Taipei for Olympic games	Australia		4-2
11/11	18:30	TF	The Philippines		The Netherlands		0-22 (7 innings)
11/11	18:30	IBC	Japan		South Korea		2-1
11/12	13:00	IBC	South Korea		Chinese Taipei (Taiwan)	Chinese Taipei for Olympic games	7-9 (12 innings)
11/12	13:00	TF	The Netherlands		Japan		0-3
11/12	18:30	TF	The Philippines		Cuba		0-24 (7 innings)
11/12	18:30	IBC	Australia		Italy		8-7 (13 innings)
11/13			Rest Day				
11/14	13:00	IBC	Cuba		Japan		6-3
11/14	13:00	TF	Italy		The Philippines		9-0
11/14	18:30	IBC	Australia		South Korea		10-9
11/14	18:30	TF	Chinese Taipei (Taiwan)	Chinese Taipei for Olympic games	The Netherlands		2-4 (10 innings)
11/15	13:00	TF	Italy		Japan		3-6
11/15	13:00	IBC	South Korea		The Netherlands		2-13 (8 innings)
11/15	18:30	IBC	Cuba		Australia		13-0 (4½ innings)^{1}
11/15	18:30	TF	The Philippines		Chinese Taipei (Taiwan)	Chinese Taipei for Olympic games	0-14 (6 innings)^{1}
11/16	13:00	IBC	Italy		South Korea		1-5
11/16	13:00	TF	Japan		The Philippines		17-0 (6½ innings)
11/16	18:30	TF	The Netherlands		Australia		4-3 (11 innings) ^{2}
11/16	18:30	IBC	Chinese Taipei (Taiwan)	Chinese Taipei for Olympic games	Cuba		4-3

^{1} Game called due to bad weather condition.
^{2} Dutch manager ejected in the top of the eleventh for obscenities in argument with an umpire.

- TF = Taichung Baseball Field
- IBC = Intercontinental Baseball Stadium

=== Round Robin Results ===
Rank	Country		W	L	Pct.	RS	RA	DI	RA/9DI
1	Cuba		6	1	.857	66	10	56	1.61
2	Japan		6	1	.857	39	16	60	2.40
3	The Netherlands		5	2	.714	55	21	51	3.05
4	Chinese Taipei (Taiwan)	Chinese Taipei for Olympic games	4	3	.571	39	33	64	4.64
5	Australia		3	4	.429	38	43	62.3	6.21
6	South Korea		2	5	.286	35	43	62	6.24
7	Italy		2	5	.286	41	41	64	5.77
8	Philippines		0	7	.000	2	108	48	20.25

DI = Innings played on defense
RA/9DI = Runs allowed for every nine defensive innings played

- Tiebreaker
  - Head-to-head
  - RA/9DI
- Notes
  - Cuba won tiebreaker over Japan based on head-to-head result
  - South Korea won tiebreaker over Italy based on head-to-head result

== Classification round ==
The teams that finish in fifth through eighth place in the round robin will face off in the consolation round. All consolation round matches will be played at Taichung Baseball Field.

5-8th place
November 18 (13:00)
Italy	8
South Korea	3
November 18 (18:30)
Philippines	0
Australia	17

5th place
November 19 (15:00)
Italy	2
Australia	3
7th place
November 19 (10:00)
South Korea	5
Philippines	1

== Medal round ==
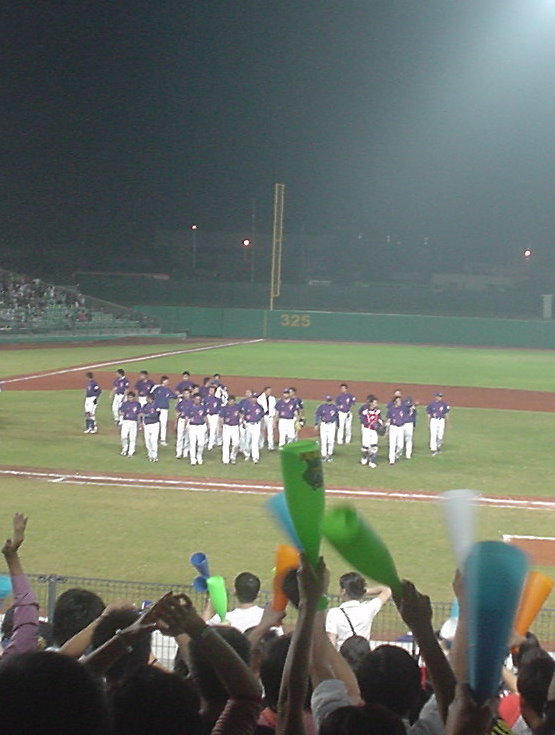
Taiwanese players thank the home fans after the loss to Cuba

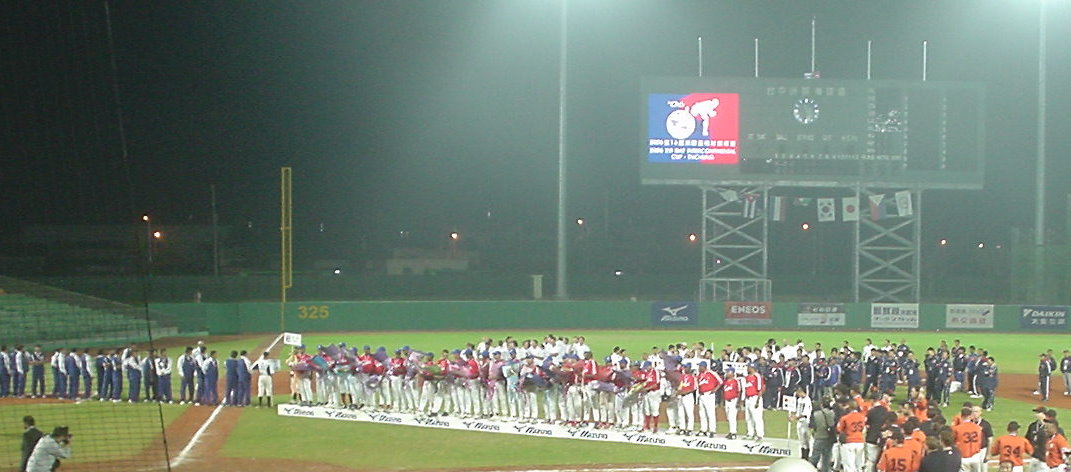
Cuba receives the gold medal between the silver and bronze medalists

The top four teams from the round robin entered the medal round of the competition. All medal round games were played at the Intercontinental Baseball Stadium.

Semi-finals
November 18 (13:00)
The Netherlands	3
Japan	0
November 18 (18:30)
Chinese Taipei (Taiwan)	4
Cuba	5

Final
November 19 (18:30)
The Netherlands	3
Cuba	6
Third place
November 19 (13:00)
Japan	0
Chinese Taipei (Taiwan)	4

Final line score

Team	1	2	3	4	5	6	7	8	9	10	11	R	H	E
Cuba	0	0	1	0	0	0	1	0	0	1	3	6	7	0
The Netherlands	0	2	0	0	0	0	0	0	0	1	0	3	9	5

== Final standings ==
Rank	Country
1	Cuba
2	The Netherlands
3	Chinese Taipei (Taiwan)
4	Japan
5	Australia
6	Italy
7	South Korea
8	Philippines

== Trivia ==
- This tournament marked the official opening of Taichung Intercontinental Baseball Stadium
- Asia's big three teams were all short-handed, as 2006 Taiwan Series champions La New Bears, Japan Series champions Hokkaido Nippon Ham Fighters, and South Korea champions Samsung Lions were all participating in the 2006 Konami Cup Asia Series in Tokyo, Japan, which started on the same day.

== See also ==
- Intercontinental Cup (baseball)
- List of sporting events in Taiwan
