= Taichung Intercontinental Baseball Stadium =

Stadium in Beitun, Taichung, Taiwan

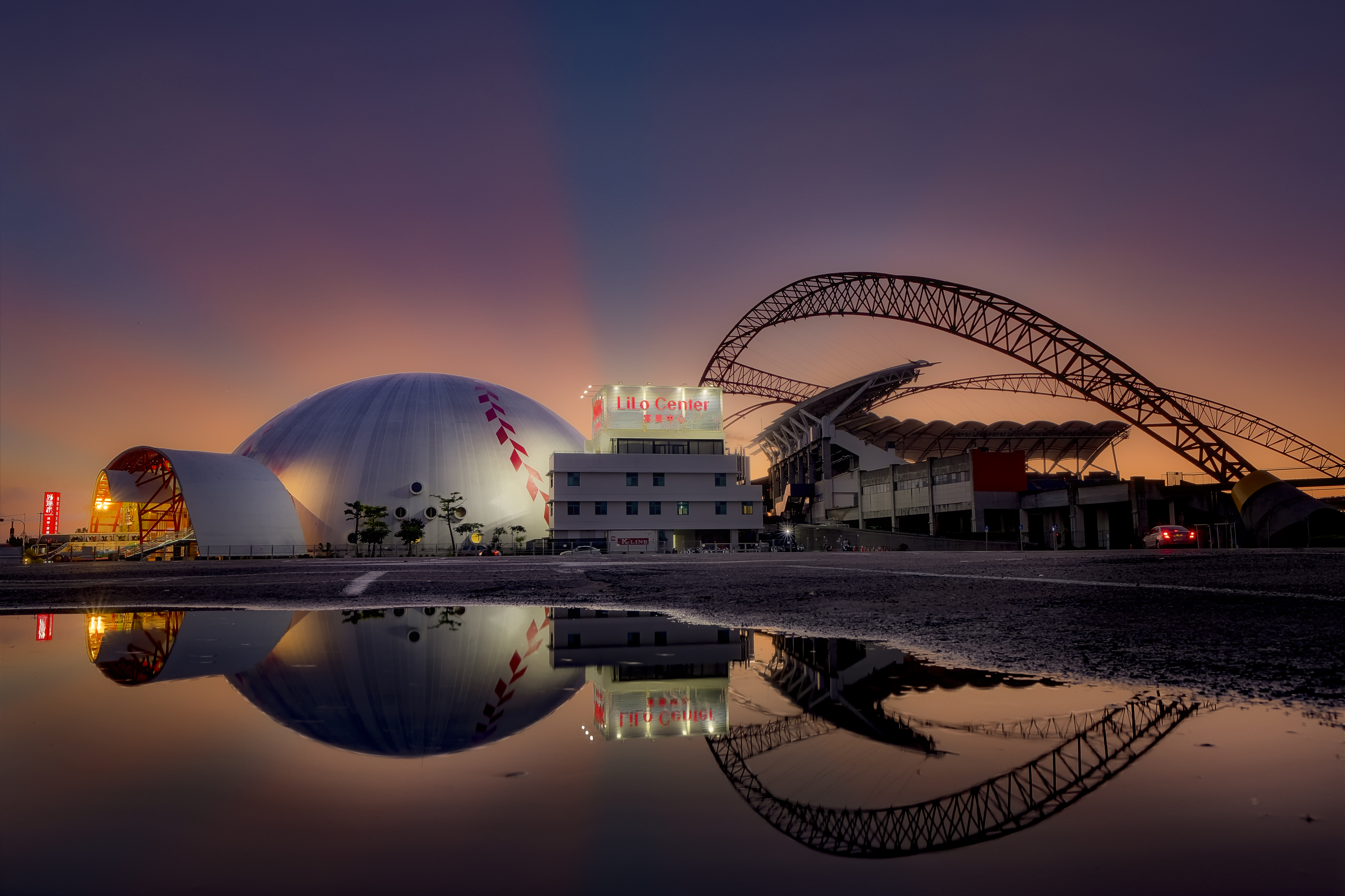
- Interactive map of Taichung Intercontinental Baseball Stadium
- Address: No. 835, Section 3, Chongde Road, Beitun District, Taichung City, Taiwan 406
- Location: Taichung City, Taiwan
- Coordinates: 24°11′59″N 120°41′06″E
- Owner: Taichung City Government
- Operator: CTBC Brothers
- Capacity: 20,000
- Surface: Bermuda grass
- Record attendance: 23,431
- Field size: Left Field – 99.1 metres (325 ft); Left-Center – 115.5 metres (379 ft); Center Field – 121.9 metres (400 ft); Right-Center – 115.5 metres (379 ft); Right Field – 99.1 metres (325 ft)
- Public transit: Taichung City Bus:12, 58, 71, 127, 700

Construction
- Groundbreaking: December 9, 2004; 21 years ago
- Opened: November 9, 2006; 19 years ago
- Cost: 1 billion NTD (about USD$33 million)

Tenant
- CTBC Brothers (2015–present)

Taichung Intercontinental Baseball Stadium (Chinese: 臺中市洲際棒球場) is a stadium in Beitun District, Taichung, Taiwan. The stadium officially opened on November 9, 2006, replacing the antiquated Taichung Baseball Field. Located on the corner of Chongde Road (崇德路) and Huanzhong Road (環中路), it has considerably more parking available than the old stadium.

The stadium is a venue for rock concerts and also hosted Zhang Yimou's Turandot at the Bird's Nest in 2010.

== Construction ==
Construction on the stadium began in 2005 and is operating on the Build-Operate-Transfer (BOT) model that is becoming increasingly common among public works projects in Taiwan. The first phase includes 15,000 infield seats, all with seatback chairs. After the second phase was completed in 2008, seating capacity was expanded to 20,000 by adding 5,000 outfield seats.

== Major events ==
The first major event hosted by the new stadium was the 2006 Intercontinental Cup, a baseball competition between eight nations from four different continents. South Korea defeated the Philippines in the opener 10–0, followed by Chinese Taipei's defeat against Italy 3–13 on November 9.

On the final day of the 2006 Intercontinental Cup it was announced that the 2007 Baseball World Cup will be held in Taichung, with this stadium one of the two to be used for the tournament. The stadium also hosted some games at the 2007 Asian Baseball Championship, which counted as the 2008 Summer Olympics qualifier for the Asia region.

The stadium hosted Pool B in the first round of the 2013 World Baseball Classic.

The stadium hosted Group A and Quarterfinals of the 2015 WBSC Premier12.

The ballpark has hosted a number of games of the Asia Winter Baseball League, most recently in November/December 2024.

The stadium hosted Pool B in the first round of the 2019 WBSC Premier12.

The stadium hosted Pool A in the first round of the 2023 World Baseball Classic.

== World Baseball City ==
Due to the success of 2006 Intercontinental Cup, Taichung City Government and Chinese Taipei Baseball Association start striving to hold various of international events in following years. The stadium had hosted 10 International Baseball Federation (IBAF) events in first 10 years since the stadium had established.

IBAF awarded the World Baseball City medal during the opening ceremony of 2013 18U Baseball World Cup in order to appreciate the contribution that Taichung City Government had done. Taichung City became the first city to be awarded by IBAF. The World Baseball City stele was also erected at the stadium entrance.

== Name confusion ==
From the beginning of this project, the stadium had been known as the Taichung International Standard Baseball Stadium. However, newspaper reports had referred to it as the Taichung International Baseball Stadium, (dropping the word "Standard".) A Chinese language schedule for the 2006 Intercontinental Cup had identified the stadium as the Taichung Intercontinental Stadium.

According to a report in 2006, the mayor of Taichung, Jason Hu, announced that the name of the stadium has been officially designated as Intercontinental Baseball Stadium. This is in honor of the event being the first to be held at the stadium.

== Miscellaneous ==
=== Stadium firsts ===
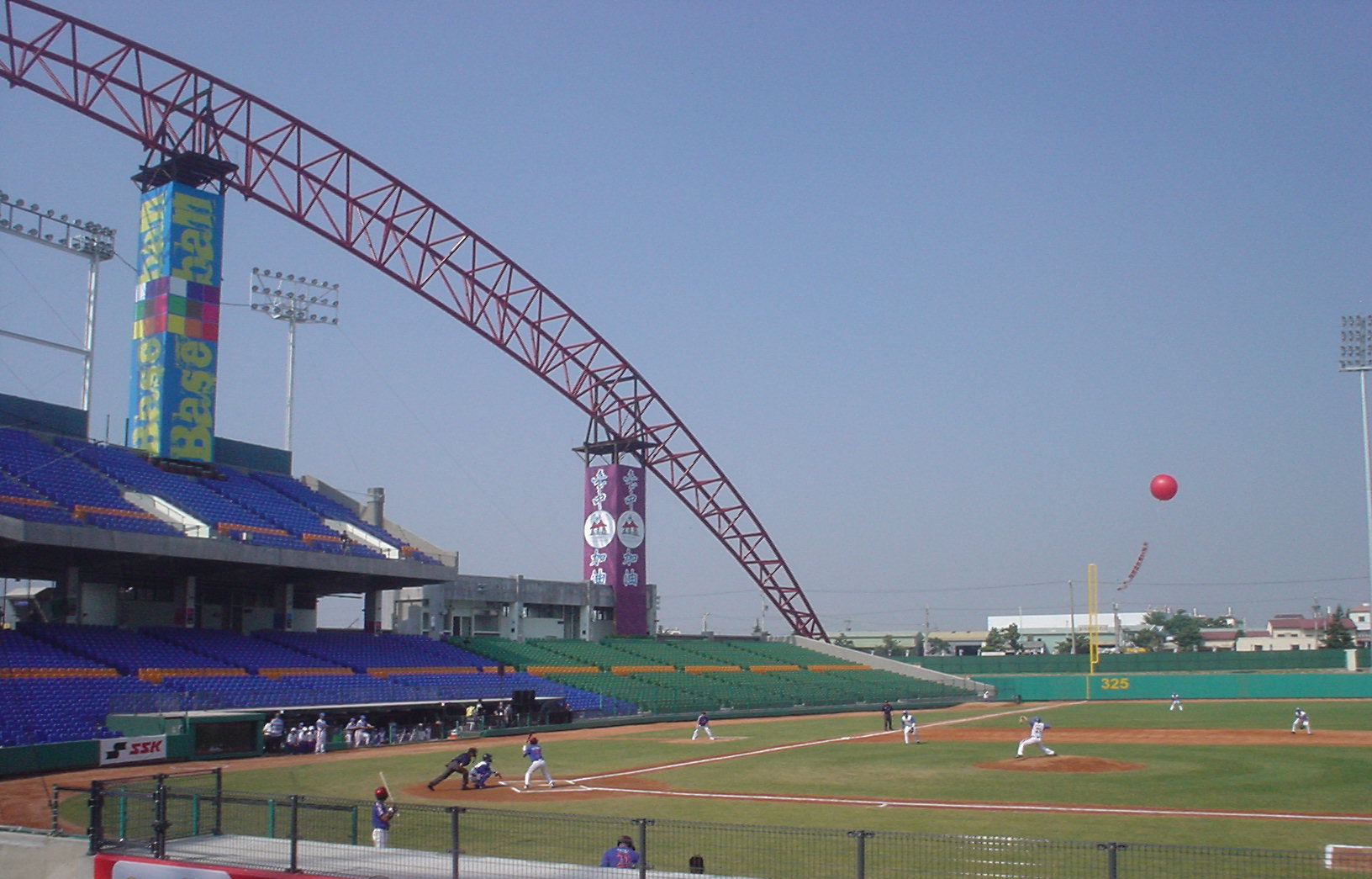
First pitch in a competitive game at the stadium in a game between the Philippines and South Korea in the 2006 Intercontinental Cup

- First competitive game: South Korea vs. Philippines; November 9, 2006, as part of the 2006 Intercontinental Cup.
- First win: South Korea 10 – Philippines 0; November 9, 2006, 2006 Intercontinental Cup
- First mercy rule win: South Korea 10 – Philippines 0; November 9, 2006; 2006 Intercontinental Cup
- First nine-inning shutout:
- First extra-inning game: Chinese Taipei vs. South Korea; November 12, 2006; 2006 Intercontinental Cup
- First home run: Bradley Harman (Australia) (8th inning vs. Philippines); November 10, 2006; 2006 Intercontinental Cup
- First grand slam: Chen Yung-Chi (Chinese Taipei) (7th inning vs. South Korea); November 12, 2006; 2006 Intercontinental Cup
- First complete game:

=== Stadium records ===
- Longest game: 13 innings – Italy vs. Australia; November 12, 2006; 2006 Intercontinental Cup
- Runs in a game (Single Team): 13 – Italy vs. Chinese Taipei; November 9, 2006; Netherlands v. South Korea, November 15, 2006 2006 Intercontinental Cup
- Runs in a game (Combined): 16 – Italy (13) vs. Chinese Taipei (3); November 9, 2006: and Chinese Taipei (9) v. South Korea (7); September 12, 2006; 2006 Intercontinental Cup
- Runs in an inning (Single Team): 6 – Italy (3rd inning) vs. Chinese Taipei, November 9, 2006; Australia (8th inning) v. the Philippines, November 10, 2006; 2006 Intercontinental Cup
- Runs in an inning (Combined): 6 – Italy vs. Chinese Taipei (3rd inning), November 9, 2006; Australia v. the Philippines (8th inning), November 10, 2006; 2006 Intercontinental Cup
- Runs in a game (Single Player): 2 – Numerous times
- RBIs in a game (Single Player): 7 – Jack Murphy, ABL Canberra Cavalry vs. Uni-President 7-Eleven Lions; 20 November 2013; 2013 Asia Series final (won 14–4 with Murphy hitting a Grand Slam Home run in the 8th inning)
- Hits in a game (Single Team): 19 - Italy vs. Chinese Taipei; November 9, 2006; 2006 Intercontinental Cup
- Hits in a game (Combined): 29 – Italy (19) vs. Chinese Taipei (10); November 9, 2006; Australia (10) v. South Korea (9) November 14, 2006 - 2006 Intercontinental Cup
- Hits in a game (Single Player): 3 – Numerous times
- Strikeouts in a game (Pitching Staff): 12 – Cuba vs. Netherlands; November 19, 2006 2006 Intercontinental Cup
- Strikeouts in a game (Single Pitcher): 8 – Frank Montieh (Cuba) vs. Netherlands; November 19, 2006; 2006 Intercontinental Cup

== Notes ==
1. "XVI Intercontinental Cup" (PDF). Archived from the original (PDF) on 2006-11-07.
2. "臺中市國際標準棒球場 (Taichung International Standard Baseball Stadium)". Archived from the original on 2005-05-29.
3. "棒協關切台中國際棒球場興建進度". Archived from the original on 2006-06-30.
4. "台中新棒球場啟用 更名為洲際棒球場 (Taichung's new baseball stadium will change name to Intercontinental Baseball Stadium)". October 20, 2006. Archived from the original on 2006-11-08.
5. "Italy v. Australia".
6. "Netherlands v. Korea".
7. "Italy v. Chinese Taipei".
8. "Korea v. Chinese Taipei".
9. "Philippines v. Australia".
10. "Korea v. Australia".
11. "Cuba v. the Netherlands".

== See also ==
- List of stadiums in Taiwan
- Sport in Taiwan
- Taichung Baseball Field
- Chinatrust Brothers
