= U-15 Baseball World Cup =

International youth baseball event

- Current season, competition or edition: 2026 U-15 Baseball World Cup
- Sport: Baseball
- Founded: 2012
- No. of teams: 12
- Continent: International
- Most recent champions: United States (8th title) (2026)
- Most titles: United States (8 titles)
- Website: U-15 Baseball World Cup

The U-15 Baseball World Cup is the 15-and-under baseball world championship that features national teams as authorized ("sanctioned") by the World Baseball Softball Confederation (WBSC). It began in 1989 as the World Youth Baseball Championship. In 2012 it became the 15U Baseball World Cup and is contested every two years. Because it is a world championship event, the results of the 15U Baseball World Cup affect the WBSC World Rankings.

== Classification ==
With the approved format of 12 national teams, the WBSC has distributed the continental quotas as follows:

- WBSC Africa: 1 spots
- WBSC Americas: 5 spots
- WBSC Asia: 2 spots
- WBSC Europe: 2 spots
- WBSC Oceania: 1 spots
- Wild cards: 1 spots (including hosts if necessary)

The participants will be determined through the continental championships.

== Results ==
Ed.	Years	Hosts	Finalists			Semi-finalists			Teams
Ed.	Years	Hosts	Champions	Score	Runners-up	3rd place	Score	4th place	Teams
World Youth Baseball Championship (U-16)
1	1989; Details	(Japan); Tokyo	Japan	5 – 4	Chinese Taipei	China		South Korea	8
2	1990; Details	(Mexico); Mazatlán	Japan	6 – 1	Brazil	Cuba			?
3	1991; Details	(Australia); Melbourne	Chinese Taipei	9 – 7	Japan	Brazil		South Korea	5
4	1993; Details	(Brazil); Londrina	Brazil	3 – 2	Chinese Taipei	South Korea		Cuba	10
5	1994; Details	(Mexico); Mazatlán	Cuba	9 – 3	Dominican Republic	Brazil			?
6	1995; Details	(Brazil); Londrina	Cuba	5 – 3	Brazil	United States		Chinese Taipei	10
7	1996; Details	(Japan); Chiba	South Korea		Cuba	Chinese Taipei		Japan	10
8	1997; Details	(Taiwan); Hsinchu	Cuba	5 – 4	Chinese Taipei	Australia		South Korea	10
9	1998; Details	(United States); Fairview Heights	United States	11 – 10	Chinese Taipei	Venezuela		Australia	12
10	2001; Details	(Mexico); Monterrey	United States	6 – 2	Venezuela	Australia		South Korea	11
11	2003; Details	(Taiwan); Kaohsiung	United States		Chinese Taipei	Cuba		Australia	9
12	2005; Details	(Mexico); Mazatlán	Cuba	5 – 0	United States	Australia			?
	2007	Venezuela	IBAF withdrew its sanction of the tournament.						
13	2009; Details	(Taiwan); Taichung	United States	7 – 6	Cuba	Mexico	11 – 10	Venezuela	12
14	2011; Details	(Mexico); Lagos de Moreno	United States	9 – 0	Cuba	Japan	8 – 7	Mexico	11
15U Baseball World Championship
1	2012; Details	(Mexico); Chihuahua	Venezuela	10 – 2	Cuba	Chinese Taipei	6 – 1	Mexico	15
15U Baseball World Cup
2	2014; Details	(Mexico); Mazatlán	Cuba	6 – 3	United States	Venezuela	13 – 3	Chinese Taipei	18
U-15 Baseball World Cup
3	2016; Details	(Japan); Iwaki	Cuba	9 – 4	Japan	United States	8 – 3	Panama	12
4	2018; Details	(Panama); David / Chitré	United States	7 – 1	Panama	Chinese Taipei	6 – 3	Japan	12
	2020	(Mexico); Tijuana	Originally scheduled to be held in 2020, but cancelled due to the COVID-19 pandemic.						
5	2022; Details	(Mexico); Hermosillo	United States	4 – 3	Cuba	Chinese Taipei	7 – 0	Japan	13
6	2024; Details	(Colombia); Barranquilla / Cartagena	Japan	7 – 6	Puerto Rico	Chinese Taipei	7 – 6	Nicaragua	12
7	2026; Details	(Mexico); Mérida / Cancún	United States	5 – 4	Dominican Republic	Japan	8 – 6	Mexico	12

== Medal table ==
Rank	Nation	Gold	Silver	Bronze	Total
1	United States	8	2	2	12
2	Cuba	6	5	2	13
3	Japan	3	2	2	7
4	Chinese Taipei^{[a]}	1	5	5	11
5	Brazil	1	2	2	5
6	Venezuela	1	1	2	4
7	South Korea	1	0	1	2
8	Dominican Republic	0	2	0	2
9	Panama	0	1	0	1
9	Puerto Rico	0	1	0	1
11	Australia	0	0	3	3
12	China	0	0	1	1
12	Mexico	0	0	1	1
Totals (13 entries)		21	21	21	63

- ^[a] Chinese Taipei is the official WBSC designation for the team representing the state officially referred to as the Republic of China, more commonly known as Taiwan. (See also political status of Taiwan for details.)

== See also ==
- Baseball awards#World
- International Baseball Federation
- World Baseball Softball Confederation
