= Taichung Baseball Field =

Baseball field in North, Taichung, Taiwan

Coordinates: 24°08′55.11″N 120°41′19.50″E

Taichung Baseball Field 台中棒球場
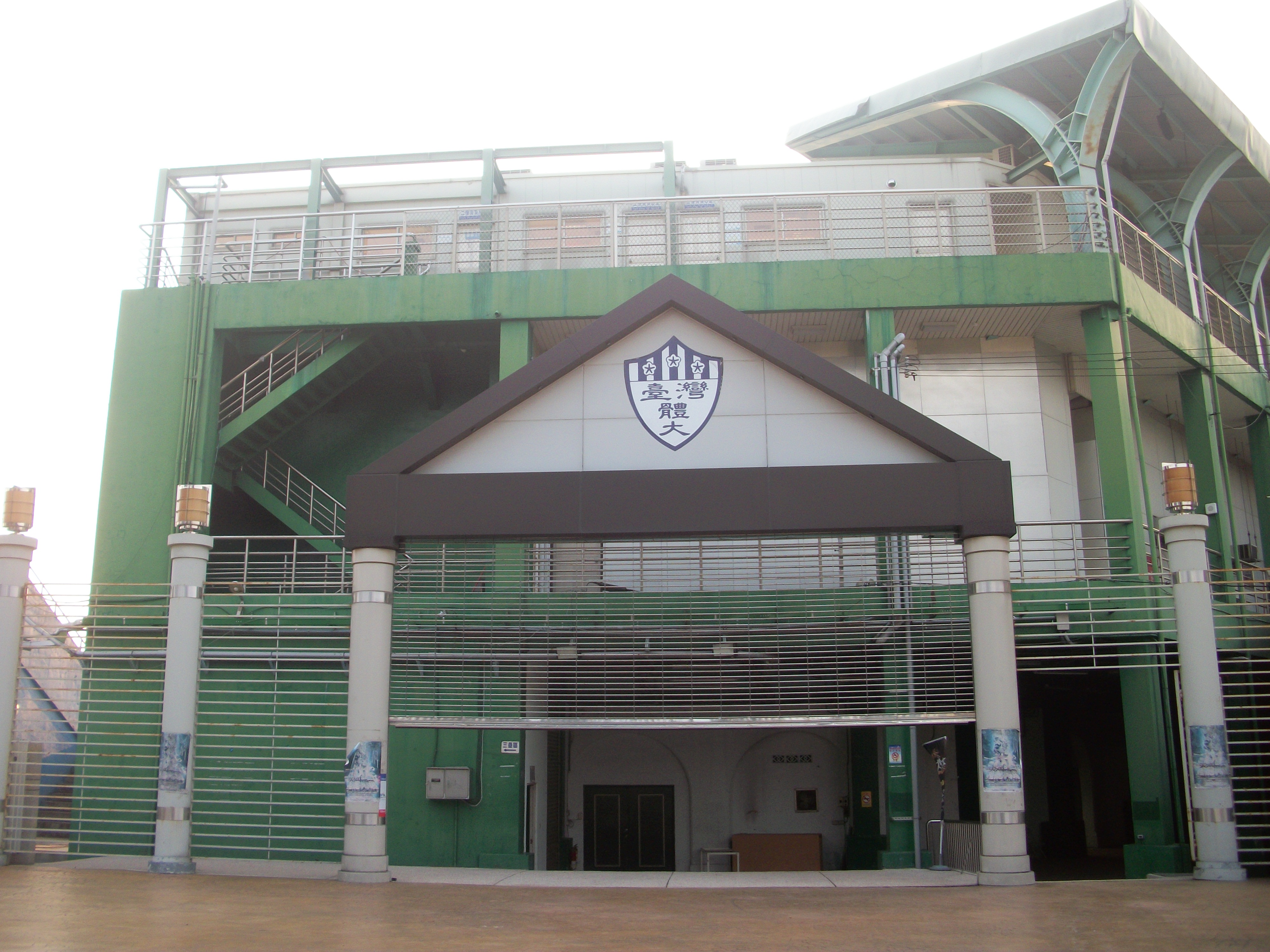
- Interactive map of Taichung Baseball Field 台中棒球場
- Full name: Taichung Baseball Field of Ministry of Sports, Executive Yuan
- Former names: Shueiyuandi Baseball Field（1935-1945） Provincial Taichung Baseball Field（1945-1998） Taichung Baseball Field of Sports Affair Council, Executive Yuan (1999-2012); Taichung Baseball Field of Sport Administration, MOE (2013-2025); Taichung Baseball Field of Ministry of Sports, Executive Yuan (2025-)
- Address: No. 16, Section 1, Shuangshi Road, North District, Taichung City, Taiwan 404
- Location: Taichung, Taiwan
- Capacity: 8,500
- Surface: Grass
- Field size: Left field – 325 ft Center field – 400 ft Right field – 325 ft

Construction
- Opened: 1935
- Renovated: 2025–
- Expanded: 2006

Tenants
- National Taiwan University of Sport (1961–present); Sinon Bulls (1993–2012); Taichung Agan (1997–2002)

The Taichung Baseball Field (Chinese: 台中棒球場; pinyin: Táizhōng Bàngqiú Chǎng) is a baseball stadium in North District, Taichung, Taiwan. It is located next to the National Taiwan University of Sport campus. Built in 1935 during the Taiwan under Japanese rule era, the stadium hosted its first professional baseball game on March 23, 1990. It has been the home of professional baseball teams such as Jungo Bears (1993–1995), Sinon Bears (first half 1996), Sinon Bulls (second half 1996–2012) of Chinese Professional Baseball League (CPBL) and Taichung Agan(1997–2002) of Taiwan Major League (TML).

The stadium was expanded in 2006. It currently seats 8,500 people. A new baseball stadium, the Taichung Intercontinental Baseball Stadium, opened in November 2006 to co-host the 2006 Intercontinental Cup, and it became the new home of the Sinon Bulls starting in 2010 season.

Taichung Baseball Field no longer hosts professional baseball games. It is mainly used for baseball practice and amateur and grassroots events.

== See also ==
- List of stadiums in Taiwan
- Sport in Taiwan
