= 2025 U-18 Women's Softball World Cup =

International youth softball tournament

Tournament details
- Host countries: United States; Brazil; China
- Dates: Group stage 23 July – 9 September 2024; Finals: 27 September – 2 October 2025
- Teams: Group stage: 18; Finals: 8 (from 5 continents)
- Venues: 4 (in 3 host cities)
- Defending champions: United States

Final positions
- Champions: United States (9th title)
- Runner-up: Japan
- Third place: Mexico

Tournament statistics
- Games played: 19
- Most Valuable Player: (United States) Juliana Hutchens

The 2025 U-18 Women's Softball World Cup is the fifteenth edition of the U-18 Women's Softball World Cup, which will be hosted for the first time by three nations.

The tournament, with a history of 42 years and 14 editions, moved to a four-year cycle and changed its competition format in 2024. The Group Stage were held between 23 July and 9 September 2024 in São Paulo, Pingtan, and Dallas. The Finals will be held in 27 September–2 October 2025 in Oklahoma City.

The previous U-18 Women's Softball World Cup was played in Lima, Peru in December 2021, with the United States winning their fourth consecutive world title, and eighth overall, following a dramatic 1–0 victory against Chinese Taipei in the final.

== Venue selection ==
On 13 December 2023, the World Baseball Softball Confederation announced Dallas as the host for one of the groups and the Finals. This will mark the first time that Dallas has hosted a softball World Cup at any category. The United States has hosted the U-18 Women's Softball World Cup (previously called the Junior Women's Softball World Championship and U-19 Women's Softball World Cup) six times in the past.

On 21 December 2023, it was announced that the tournament would return to China after 21 years. Nanjing hosted the event in 2003. This will be the third Softball World Cup on Chinese soil, having also hosted the 2006 Women's Softball World Championship in Beijing.

The same day, Sao Paulo was announced as the host city for the other group. Brazil will host a Softball World Cup for the first time, becoming the 16th nation to host a Women's Softball World Cup, across all categories. Counting Men's Softball World Cups, Brazil will be the 20th host nation of a global softball event.

Group A was played in São Paulo, Brazil, from 23 to 27 July. Group B was played in Pingtan, China, from 14 to 18 August. Group C was played in Dallas, United States, from 29 August to 2 September.

Group A	Group B	Group C & Finals		
(Brazil) São Paulo, Brasil	Pingtan, China	Dallas & Oklahoma City, United States		
Estádio Municipal de Beisebol Mie Nishi	Pingtan Softball Stadium	The Village Dallas	Oge Energy Field	Devon Park - Venue 2
Capacity: 2,500	Capacity: 5,030	Capacity:	Capacity:	Capacity:

== Competition format ==
Under the new format, the Group Stage and Finals of the World Cups are played in consecutive years. A total of 18 teams will participate in the U-18 Women's Softball World Cup, distributed in three different groups for the Group Stage. Two teams from each group, plus two wild cards, will advance to the Finals, to be played in 2025.

Each group of six teams will play a single round robin, with the top four teams in the standings advancing to the play-offs. The play-offs will open with a knockout match between the third- and fourth-placed teams, followed by a one-on-two matchup, with the winner earning the first available ticket to the finals. The winner of the first game (3 vs. 4) and the loser of the second game (1 vs. 2) will meet in the Repechage Game, in a winner-takes-all competition for second place in next year's Finals.

The wildcard designation criteria for the Finals are (in order):

Criteria 1: A wildcard spot secured for the host country;

Criteria 2: Team(s) with the best third-place finish in the Group Stage, based on the final standings of the previous edition of the World Cup;

Criteria 3: Team(s) in third place in the Group Stage based on the highest position in the WBSC World Ranking at the end of the previous calendar year.

During the final phase, after a group round-robin, the top two seeds from each group advance to the Super Round, while the number three and four seeds will compete in the Placement Round. The number one and two seeds after the Super Round will compete in the World Cup Final. The third and fourth-place finishers will play for bronze.

== Classification and participating nations ==
With the approved format of 18 national teams, the WBSC has distributed the continental quotas as follows:

- Wild card Hosts 2 slots: United States, Brazil
- WBSC Europe 3 slots: Czech Republic, Italy, Ireland
- WBSC Asia 3 slots: Japan, Chinese Taipei, China
- WBSC Oceania 2 slots: New Zealand, Australia
- WBSC Americas 5 slots: Puerto Rico, Canada, Mexico, Peru, Colombia
- WBSC Africa ~~2 slots~~
- Wild card 1+2 slots: Great Britain, Netherlands, Philippines

The participants were determined through the continental championships. Due to the absence of national teams and qualifying tournaments in Africa, the two available spots for this continent were granted as invitations to teams that did not qualify through their respective continental championships.

Team	Ranking	Previous appearances (Last time)	Best position
United States	1	14 (2021)	**Champions** (**1987**, **1995**, **2007**, **2011**, **2015**, **2017**, **2019**, **2021)**
Brazil	22	6 (2019)	Seventh (2011, 2013)
China	17	13 (2019)	**Champion** (**1985**)
Czech Republic	9	9 (2021)	Fifth (2021)
Italy	6	8 (2019)	Ninth (1987, 1995, 2015)
Ireland	21	2 (2019)	14.º (2019)
Japan	3	13 (2019)	**Champion** (**1981**, **1991**, **1999**, **2003**, **2013**)
Chinese Taipei	4	13 (2021)	Runners-up (2021)
New Zealand	33	11 (2019)	Fourth (2013)
Australia	10	13 (2019)	Third (1991, 1995, 2003, 2007, 2013)
Puerto Rico	2	7 (2021)	Third (2015, 2017, 2021)
Canada	5	13 (2019)	Third (2019)
Mexico	7	8 (2021)	Fourth (2021)
Peru	14	2 (2021)	Sixth (2021)
Colombia	33	2 (2021)	Eighth (2021)
Great Britain	13	3 (2017)	Ninth (2013)
Netherlands	8	12 (2021)	Sixth (1985, 1987, 2007)
Philippines	15	4 (2017)	Ninth (2003)

Year in italics means venue of the event. Year in bold means champion of the event.

== Officials ==
32 umpires were selected by the WBSC for the tournament.

Umpires
Confederation	Umpires
WBSC Africa	George Ashley Mmakola (South Africa)
WBSC Asia	Cheng Tao (China)
WBSC Asia	Xu Jianying (China)
WBSC Asia	Hu Yue (China)
WBSC Asia	Li Yunxiao (China)
WBSC Asia	Hu Tshang-Sheng (Chinese Taipei)
WBSC Asia	Yu-Sung Lin (Chinese Taipei)
WBSC Asia	Koji Ogawa (Japan)
WBSC Asia	Miki Yabe (Japan)
WBSC Asia	Jo Boyeon (South Korea)
WBSC Americas	Analia Laura Merrizi (Argentina)
WBSC Americas	Gabriela Elizabeth Jimenez (Argentina)
WBSC Americas	Nicolas Deu (Argentina)
WBSC Americas	Nicolas Eleazar (Argentina)
WBSC Americas	Anderson Umakoshi (Brazil)
WBSC Americas	Patricia Hamamoto (Brazil)
WBSC Americas	Emma Rose Jerome Smith (Canada)
WBSC Americas	Kris Lee Hartley (Canada)
WBSC Americas	Laura McMillan (Canada)
WBSC Americas	Maykel Garcia (Cuba)
WBSC Americas	Bradley Craig Newton (United States)
WBSC Americas	John Baca (United States)
WBSC Americas	Mark Craver (United States)
WBSC Americas	Naomi Erdahl (United States)
WBSC Americas	Stacy Michelle Newton (United States)
WBSC Americas	Carlos Alberto Padron (Venezuela)
WBSC Europe	Megan Hylton (Germany)
WBSC Europe	Denis Codarini (Italy)
WBSC Europe	Ibon Arévalo (Spain)
WBSC Oceania	Derrin Clark (Australia)
WBSC Oceania	Kerry Lee Franklin (Australia)
WBSC Oceania	Anthony Kairuna (New Zealand)

39 scorers and technical commissions were selected by the WBSC for the tournament.

Scorers and technical commissions
Confederation	Scorers and technical commissions
WBSC Asia	Jiaqi Xu (China)
WBSC Asia	Liu Yuxue (China)
WBSC Asia	Huanyun Shen (China)
WBSC Asia	Min Xue (China)
WBSC Asia	Susan Zhang (China)
WBSC Asia	Xie Jin (China)
WBSC Asia	Wayne Horng (Chinese Taipei)
WBSC Asia	Akane Touki (Japan)
WBSC Asia	Fuka Nakamura (Japan)
WBSC Asia	Masayoshi Sato (Japan)
WBSC Asia	Kok Wooi See (Malaysia)
WBSC Asia	Jisuk Woo (South Korea)
WBSC Americas	Cristian Lacout (Argentina)
WBSC Americas	Jorginho Kozano (Brazil)
WBSC Americas	Regina Someya (Brazil)
WBSC Americas	Ricardo Yokohama (Brazil)
WBSC Americas	Sayuri Egashira (Brazil)
WBSC Americas	Brent Chadwick (Canada)
WBSC Americas	William Cogollo (Colombia)
WBSC Americas	Roberto Castro (Costa Rica)
WBSC Americas	Carlos del Pino (Cuba)
WBSC Americas	Juan Chavez (Guatemala)
WBSC Americas	Gabriel Almaraz (Mexico)
WBSC Americas	Juan Cubillo (Nicaragua)
WBSC Americas	Daniela Osaki (Peru)
WBSC Americas	Annette Willians (United States)
WBSC Americas	Carson Paige Osborne (United States)
WBSC Americas	Jackie Shults (United States)
WBSC Americas	Michael Craig (United States)
WBSC Americas	Paige Bond (United States)
WBSC Americas	Rich Cress (United States)
WBSC Americas	Ray Gutierrez (United States)
WBSC Americas	Steven Mc Cown (United States)
WBSC Europe	Eleonora Toneli (Italy)
WBSC Europe	Giovanni Sanna (Italy)
WBSC Europe	Roberto Saletti (Italy)
WBSC Europe	Guillem Alzamora (Spain)
WBSC Oceania	Brooke Penfold (Australia)

== Group stage ==
=== Group A ===
Group A will be contested in Sao Paulo during 23–27 July 2024.

Pos	Team	Pld	W	L	RF	RA	RD	PCT	GB	Qualification
1	Chinese Taipei	6	6	0	26	24	+2	1.000	—	Advance to Group A Final
2	Czechia	7	5	2	5	25	−20	.714	1.5	Advance to Group A Final
3	New Zealand	7	3	4	38	14	+24	.429	3.5	Advance to Group A third place play-off
4	Great Britain	6	2	4	0	31	−31	.333	4	Advance to Group A third place play-off
5	Brazil (H)	6	3	3	2	13	−11	.500	3	
6	Colombia	6	0	6	5	11	−6	.000	6	

Source: WBSC
Rules for classification: 1) Wins/losses; 2) Head-to-head record; 3) TQB; 4) ER-TQB; 5) Highest batting average; 6) Coin toss
(H) Hosts

Date	Local time	Road team	Score	Home team	Inn.	Venue	Game duration	Attendance	Boxscore
23 July 2024	12:00	New Zealand	4–8	Chinese Taipei	7	Estádio Municipal de Beisebol Mie Nishi	1:55	234	Boxscore
23 July 2024	15:00	Colombia	0–7	Brazil	5	Estádio Municipal de Beisebol Mie Nishi	1:35	711	Boxscore
23 July 2024	18:00	Great Britain	0–9	Czech Republic	4	Estádio Municipal de Beisebol Mie Nishi	1:34	230	Boxscore
24 July 2024	10:00	Chinese Taipei	10–2	Colombia	5	Estádio Municipal de Beisebol Mie Nishi	1:49	151	Boxscore
24 July 2024	13:00	Chinese Taipei	16–1	Brazil	4	Estádio Municipal de Beisebol Mie Nishi	1:24	782	Boxscore
24 July 2024	16:00	Brazil	1–2	Great Britain	7	Estádio Municipal de Beisebol Mie Nishi	1:54	353	Boxscore
24 July 2024	19:00	Czech Republic	3–8	New Zealand	7	Estádio Municipal de Beisebol Mie Nishi	1:58	73	Boxscore
25 July 2024	10:00	Great Britain	0–10	Chinese Taipei	4	Estádio Municipal de Beisebol Mie Nishi	1:18	38	Boxscore
25 July 2024	13:00	Colombia	1–8	Great Britain	5	Estádio Municipal de Beisebol Mie Nishi	1:16	99	Boxscore
25 July 2024	16:00	Colombia	4–11	Czech Republic	6	Estádio Municipal de Beisebol Mie Nishi	2:01	157	Boxscore
25 July 2024	19:00	Brazil	8–6	New Zealand	7	Estádio Municipal de Beisebol Mie Nishi	2:20	511	Boxscore
26 July 2024	10:00	Czech Republic	2–6	Chinese Taipei	7	Estádio Municipal de Beisebol Mie Nishi	1:50	78	Boxscore
26 July 2024	13:00	Brazil	1–5	Czech Republic	7	Estádio Municipal de Beisebol Mie Nishi	1:53	208	Boxscore
26 July 2024	16:00	New Zealand	13–11	Great Britain	7	Estádio Municipal de Beisebol Mie Nishi	2:44	123	Boxscore
26 July 2024	19:00	New Zealand	11–9	Colombia	7	Estádio Municipal de Beisebol Mie Nishi	2:21	173	Boxscore

=== Bracket ===
Final
27 July – Estádio Municipal de Beisebol Mie Nishi
Colombia	5
Brazil	6
27 July – Estádio Municipal de Beisebol Mie Nishi
Czech Republic	0
New Zealand	2

Repechage
27 July – Estádio Municipal de Beisebol Mie Nishi
Czech Republic	7
New Zealand	1

Round	Date	Local Time	Road team	Score	Home team	Inn.	Venue	Game duration	Attendance	Boxscore
5th place match	27 July 2024	10:00	Colombia	5–6	Brazil	7	Estádio Municipal de Beisebol Mie Nishi	2:08	422	Boxscore
3rd place match	27 July 2024	13:00	Great Britain	0–2	Czech Republic	7	Estádio Municipal de Beisebol Mie Nishi	1:33	106	Boxscore
Final	27 July 2024	16:00	New Zealand	1–9	Chinese Taipei	5	Estádio Municipal de Beisebol Mie Nishi	1:21	388	Boxscore
Repechage	27 July 2024	19:00	Czech Republic	7–1	New Zealand	7	Estádio Municipal de Beisebol Mie Nishi	1:56	232	Boxscore

=== Group B ===
Group B will be contested in Pingtan during 15–19 August 2024.

Pos	Team	Pld	W	L	RF	RA	RD	PCT	GB	Qualification
1	Japan	5	5	0	31	24	+7	1.000	—	Advance to Group B Final
2	China (H)	5	4	1	12	5	+7	.800	1	Advance to Group B Final
3	Puerto Rico	5	3	2	3	5	−2	.600	2	Advance to Group B third place play-off
4	Netherlands	5	2	3	7	0	+7	.400	3	Advance to Group B third place play-off
5	Italy	5	1	4	0	15	−15	.200	4	
6	Peru	5	0	5	1	0	+1	.000	5	

Source: WBSC
Rules for classification: 1) Wins/losses; 2) Head-to-head record; 3) TQB; 4) ER-TQB; 5) Highest batting average; 6) Coin toss
(H) Hosts

Date	Local time	Road team	Score	Home team	Inn.	Venue	Game duration	Attendance	Boxscore
15 August 2024	9:00	Puerto Rico	1–8	Japan	6	Pingtan Softball Stadium	1:31	50	Boxscore
16 August 2024	14:30	Italy	0–10	Japan	4	Pingtan Softball Stadium	1:13	80	Boxscore
16 August 2024	16:20	Netherlands	3–4	Puerto Rico	7	Pingtan Softball Stadium	1:43	100	Boxscore
16 August 2024	18:40	China	8–0	Peru	5	Pingtan Softball Stadium	1:56	35	Boxscore
17 August 2024	15:00	China	3–0	Netherlands	5	Pingtan Softball Stadium	1:19	70	Boxscore
17 August 2024	16:25	Peru	0–13	Italy	4	Pingtan Softball Stadium	1:11	35	Boxscore
17 August 2024	18:10	Japan	10–0	Netherlands	5	Pingtan Softball Stadium	1:19	70	Boxscore
17 August 2024	19:55	Italy	0–1	Puerto Rico	5	Pingtan Softball Stadium	1:08	74	Boxscore
18 August 2024	10:00	Puerto Rico	1–3	China	5	Pingtan Softball Stadium	1:07	60	Boxscore
18 August 2024	11:30	Peru	0–6	Japan	5	Pingtan Softball Stadium	1:15	30	Boxscore
18 August 2024	15:30	China	1–0	Italy	5	Pingtan Softball Stadium	1:01	85	Boxscore
18 August 2024	16:55	Netherlands	1–0	Peru	5	Pingtan Softball Stadium	1:16	70	Boxscore
18 August 2024	19:00	Peru	1–11	Puerto Rico	4	Pingtan Softball Stadium	1:19	90	Boxscore
19 August 2024	9:00	Netherlands	3–2	Italy	5	Pingtan Softball Stadium	1:22	80	Boxscore
19 August 2024	11:00	Japan	21–2	China	4	Pingtan Softball Stadium	1:45	150	Boxscore

=== Bracket ===
Final
19 August – Pingtan Softball Stadium
19 August – Pingtan Softball Stadium

Repechage
19 August – Pingtan Softball Stadium

Round	Date	Local Time	Road team	Score	Home team	Inn.	Venue	Game duration	Attendance	Boxscore
5th place match	19 August 2024	:	B6	Cancelled	B5		Pingtan Softball Stadium			
3rd place match	19 August 2024	:	B4	Cancelled	B3		Pingtan Softball Stadium			
Final	19 August 2024	:	B2	Cancelled	B1		Pingtan Softball Stadium			
Repechage	19 August 2024	:	Winner of Game 17	Cancelled	Loser of Game 18		Pingtan Softball Stadium			

=== Group C ===
Group A will be contested in Dallas during 29 August – 2 September 2024.

Pos	Team	Pld	W	L	RF	RA	RD	PCT	GB	Qualification
1	United States (H)	6	6	0	34	22	+12	1.000	—	Advance to Group C Final
2	Canada	7	5	2	11	15	−4	.714	1.5	Advance to Group C Final
3	Mexico	7	4	3	6	11	−5	.571	2.5	Advance to Group C third place play-off
4	Australia	6	2	4	11	0	+11	.333	4	Advance to Group C third place play-off
5	Philippines	6	2	4	0	8	−8	.333	4	
6	Ireland	6	0	6	0	2	−2	.000	6	

Source: WBSC
Rules for classification: 1) Wins/losses; 2) Head-to-head record; 3) TQB; 4) ER-TQB; 5) Highest batting average; 6) Coin toss
(H) Hosts

Date	Local time	Road team	Score	Home team	Inn.	Venue	Game duration	Attendance	Boxscore
29 August 2024	12:30	Australia	7–4	Philippines	7	The Village Dallas	2:12	100	Boxscore
29 August 2024	17:50	Canada	9–0	Mexico	5	The Village Dallas	1:37	100	Boxscore
29 August 2024	20:20	Ireland	0–15	United States	3	The Village Dallas	1:00	170	Boxscore
30 August 2024	9:30	Mexico	6–4	Philippines	9	The Village Dallas	3:28	80	Boxscore
30 August 2024	12:30	Philippines	5–2	Ireland	7	The Village Dallas	1:49	92	Boxscore
30 August 2024	15:30	United States	10–0	Australia	4	The Village Dallas	1:24	160	Boxscore
30 August 2024	18:30	United States	9–1	Canada	6	The Village Dallas	1:40	207	Boxscore
31 August 2024	9:30	Australia	4–0	Ireland	7	The Village Dallas	1:42	133	Boxscore
31 August 2024	12:30	Ireland	0–8	Canada	5	The Village Dallas	1:09	110	Boxscore
31 August 2024	15:30	Philippines	0–6	Canada	7	The Village Dallas	1:45	84	Boxscore
31 August 2024	18:30	Mexico	0–15	United States	3	The Village Dallas	1:04	298	Boxscore
1 September 2024	9:30	Canada	2–0	Australia	7	The Village Dallas	1:29	111	Boxscore
1 September 2024	12:30	Australia	0–2	Mexico	7	The Village Dallas	1:43	131	Boxscore
1 September 2024	15:30	Ireland	0–9	Mexico	5	The Village Dallas	1:18	167	Boxscore
1 September 2024	18:30	Philippines	0–7	United States	5	The Village Dallas	1:26	256	Boxscore

=== Bracket ===
Final
2 September – The Village Dallas
Canada	0
United States	7
2 September – The Village Dallas
Australia	5
Mexico	6

Repechage
2 September – The Village Dallas
Mexico	2
Canada	9

Round	Date	Local Time	Road team	Score	Home team	Inn.	Venue	Game duration	Attendance	Boxscore
5th place match	2 September 2024	10:30	Ireland	0–4	Philippines	7	The Village Dallas	1:32	72	Boxscore
3rd place match	2 September 2024	13:00	Australia	5–6	Mexico	7	The Village Dallas	2:18	130	Boxscore
Final	2 September 2024	15:30	Canada	0–7	United States	6	The Village Dallas	1:43	180	Boxscore
Repechage	2 September 2024	18:30	Mexico	2–9	Canada	5	The Village Dallas	1:10	132	Boxscore

=== Finals rankings ===
The ranking of the wildcard spots for the finals stage are as follows.

- 1) Hosts
- 2)Top third-place team(s) in the Group Stage, based on final standings from the previous edition of the World Cup
- 3)Top third-place team(s) in the Group Stage based on the highest position in the WBSC Rankings at the end of the previous calendar year.

Rank	Team	Previous WC	Ranking	Qualification
1	United States (H)	6	0	Qualified as hosts
2	Mexico	4	3	Qualified from previous World Cup ranking
3	New Zealand	3	4	

United States qualified for the finals as host of that stage, while Mexico qualified as the third placed team with the next best finish at the previous U-18 World Cup.

== Finals ==
=== Group A ===
Pos	Team	Pld	W	L	RF	RA	RD	PCT	GB	Qualification
1	United States (H)	3	3	0	26	0	+26	1.000	—	Advance to Super Round
2	China	3	2	1	20	0	+20	.667	1	Advance to Super Round
3	Chinese Taipei	3	1	2	18	3	+15	.333	2	Advance to Placement Round
4	Canada	3	0	3	3	19	−16	.000	3	Advance to Placement Round

First match(es) will be played: 27 September 2025. Source: WBSC
Rules for classification: 1) Wins/losses; 2) Head to head; 3) Head to head runs against; 4) Runs against; 5) Head to head
(H) Hosts

Date	Local time	Road team	Score	Home team	Inn.	Venue	Game duration	Attendance	Boxscore
27 September 2025	15:30	Canada	2–9	Chinese Taipei	6	Devon Park - Venue 2	2:10	150	Boxscore
27 September 2025	15:30	China	0–6	United States	7	Oge Engery Field	1:41	0	Boxscore
27 September 2025	20:00	Chinese Taipei	0–9	United States	5	Oge Energy Field	1:50	250	Boxscore
28 September 2025	11:00	Canada	0–10	China	4	Devon Park - Venue 2	1:23	50	Boxscore
28 September 2025	15:30	China	4–1	Chinese Taipei	7	Devon Park - Venue 2	2:04	0	Boxscore
28 September 2025	18:30	United States	11–1	Canada	5	Devon Park - Venue 2	1:29	0	Boxscore

=== Group B ===
Pos	Team	Pld	W	L	RF	RA	RD	PCT	GB	Qualification
1	Japan	3	3	0	30	2	+28	1.000	—	Advance to Super Round
2	Mexico	3	1	2	8	29	−21	.333	2	Advance to Super Round
3	Czech Republic	3	1	2	11	9	+2	.333	2	Advance to Placement Round
4	Puerto Rico	3	1	2	7	13	−6	.333	2	Advance to Placement Round

First match(es) will be played: 27 September 2025. Source: WBSC
Rules for classification: 1) Wins/losses; 2) Head to head; 3) Head to head runs against; 4) Runs against; 5) Head to head

Date	Local time	Road team	Score	Home team	Inn.	Venue	Game duration	Attendance	Boxscore
27 September 2025	11:00	Mexico	7–8	Puerto Rico	9	Devon Park - Venue 2	2:38	0	Boxscore
27 September 2025	11:00	Japan	9–2	Czech Republic	5	Oge Energy Field	1:25	100	Boxscore
27 September 2025	20:00	Czech Republic	4–0	Puerto Rico	7	Devon Park - Venue 2	2:05	96	Boxscore
28 September 2025	11:00	Mexico	0–13	Japan	4	Oge Energy Field	0:56	0	Boxscore
28 September 2025	15:30	Puerto Rico	1–8	Japan	5	Oge Energy Field	1:15	0	Boxscore
28 September 2025	18:30	Czech Republic	5–9	Mexico	7	Oge Energy Field	2:07	45	Boxscore

=== Placement Round ===
Pos	Team	Pld	W	L	RF	RA	RD	PCT	GB
1	Czech Republic	3	2	1	2	6	−4	.667	—
2	Canada	3	2	1	16	3	+13	.667	—
3	Puerto Rico	3	1	2	3	11	−8	.333	1
4	Chinese Taipei	3	1	2	12	1	+11	.333	1

First match(es) will be played: 29 September 2025. Source: WBSC
Rules for classification: 1) Wins/losses; 2) Head to head; 3) Head to head runs against; 4) Runs against; 5) Head to head

Date	Local time	Road team	Score	Home team	Inn.	Venue	Game duration	Attendance	Boxscore
29 September 2025	10:00	Puerto Rico	3–4	Canada	7	Oge Energy Field	1:53	0	Boxscore
29 September 2025	13:00	Chinese Taipei	1–6	Czech Republic	7	Oge Energy Field	1:53	85	Boxscore
30 September 2025	10:00	Puerto Rico	7–6	Chinese Taipei	7	Oge Energy Field	2:22	0	Boxscore
30 September 2025	13:00	Canada	12–1	Czech Republic	5	Oge Energy Field	1:42	107	Boxscore

=== Super Round ===
Pos	Team	Pld	W	L	RF	RA	RD	PCT	GB	Qualification
1	United States	3	3	0	15	4	+11	1.000	—	Advance to Final
2	Japan	3	2	1	4	10	−6	.667	1	Advance to Final
3	China	3	1	2	7	3	+4	.333	2	Advance to Third place play-off
4	Mexico	3	0	3	3	9	−6	.000	3	Advance to Third place play-off

First match(es) will be played: 29 September 2025. Source: WBSC
Rules for classification: 1) Wins/losses; 2) Head to head; 3) Head to head runs against; 4) Runs against; 5) Head to head

Date	Local time	Road team	Score	Home team	Inn.	Venue	Game duration	Attendance	Boxscore
29 September 2025	18:00	China	7–3	Mexico	7	Oge Energy Field	18:09	0	Boxscore
29 September 2025	19:00	United States	5–4	Japan	7	Oge Energy Field	1:32	0	Boxscore
30 September 2025	16:00	China	0–5	Japan	7	Oge Energy Field	1:35	0	Boxscore
30 September 2025	19:00	Mexico	2–10	United States	6	Oge Energy Field	1:36	205	Boxscore

=== Third place play-off ===
1 October 2025 11:00 Oge Energy Field
Team	1	2	3	4	5	6	7	R	H	E
Mexico	2	1	0	0	1	0	0	4	11	1
China	0	0	0	0	0	1	1	2	6	3
WP: Analia Nevaeh Lopez Valdivia LP: Zhou Menghuan; Attendance: 350; Boxscore

=== Final ===
1 October 2025 14:00 Oge Energy Field
Team	1	2	3	4	5	6	7	R	H	E
Japan	0	0	2	0	0	0	0	2	7	1
United States	0	0	3	1	0	3	X	7	6	2
WP: Caroline Elizabeth Stanton LP: Shion Yamamoto; Attendance: 300; Boxscore

== Final standings ==
Rank	Team
1st place, gold medalist(s)	United States
2nd place, silver medalist(s)	Japan
3rd place, bronze medalist(s)	Mexico
4	China
5	Canada
6	Czech Republic
7	Puerto Rico
8	Chinese Taipei
