= WBSC Oceania =

Governing body of baseball within Oceania

- Type: Sports organization
- Region served: Oceania
- Members: 21 member associations
- President: Robert Steffy
- Parent organization: World Baseball Softball Confederation
- Website: www.wbscoceania.org

The World Baseball Softball Confederation Oceania, known as WBSC Oceania, formerly known as Baseball Confederation of Oceania (abbreviated as BCO), is the governing body of baseball and softball within Oceania, and is responsible for the Oceania Baseball Championship.

The Baseball Confederation of Oceania was established in 1989, it currently has 14 member nations. Not all member nations are represented in the executive committee which creates conflict within the region. The lesser countries tend not to support regional tournaments which contributes negatively to the growth of the sport in the region.

Ray Brown, the BCO Development Officer, provides support throughout the region.

Since 2006, the BCO has run a Regional Training Centre for aspiring players. Run for approximately 10 days, the RTC is open to players 14-18 who want to perform at a higher level. In 2006, the RTC was held in Auckland, New Zealand. In 2007, it was held in Christchurch, New Zealand.

== History ==
Baseball arrived in most parts of Oceania as a result of Japanese influence prior to and during World War II, and American influence, particularly following the war. The Japanese influenced was most pronounced in Micronesia, particularly Palau.

The Baseball Confederation of Oceania was established in 1989, it currently has 14 member nations.

The organisation adopted a policy of sharing the rights to hold BCO Tournaments between the northern and southern Oceania areas, on an alternative basis. Either New Zealand or Australia should hold the 18U BCO playoffs in 2015 since Guam held them in 2012. It is likely that New Zealand will hold this tournament due to the cancelling of the 15U tournament which was to be held in Auckland, New Zealand early in 2015. The cancellation was of huge disappointment to the New Zealand Baseball organisation and community. The game in New Zealand is growing significantly, which is important for the overall region and Baseball NZ had organised the local cable television company SkyTV to show some of the games lives to boost the sports profile.

== Members ==
=== Baseball ===
| Code | Association | National teams | Founded | Membership | IOC member | Note |
|---|---|---|---|---|---|---|
| ASA | American Samoa | (M, W) | 1995 | Full | Yes | (Note: Unorganized unincorporated territory of the United States.) |
| AUS | Australia | (M, W) | 1913 | Full | Yes | |
| FIJ | Fiji | (M, W) | 2000 | Full | Yes | |
| FSM | (Federated States of Micronesia) FS Micronesia | (M, W) | | Full | Yes | |
| GUM | Guam | (M, W) | 2007 | Full | Yes | |
| MHL | Marshall Islands | (M, W) | | Full | Yes | |
| NCL | New Caledonia | (M, W) | 1993 | Full | No | (Note: Sui generis collectivity of France.) |
| NZL | New Zealand | (M, W) | 1989 | Full | Yes | |
| MNP | Northern Mariana Islands | (M, W) | | Provisional | No | |
| PLW | Palau | (M, W) | 1999 | Full | Yes | |
| PNG | Papua New Guinea | (M, W) | | Full | Yes | |
| SOL | Solomon Islands | (M, W) | | Full | Yes | |
| TGA | Tonga | (M, W) | 2019 | Full | Yes | |

=== Softball ===
| Code | Association | National teams | Founded | Membership | IOC member | Note |
|---|---|---|---|---|---|---|
| ASA | American Samoa | (M, W) | 1985 | Full | Yes | |
| AUS | Australia | (M, W) | 2009 | Full | Yes | |
| FSM | (Federated States of Micronesia) FS Micronesia | (M, W) | | Full | Yes | |
| GUM | Guam | (M, W) | | Full | Yes | |
| MHL | Marshall Islands | (M, W) | | Full | Yes | |
| NZL | New Zealand | (M, W) | 1938 | Full | Yes | |
| MNP | Northern Mariana Islands | (M, W) | | Provisional | No | |
| PLW | Palau | (M, W) | 2006 | Full | Yes | |
| PNG | Papua New Guinea | (M, W) | | Full | Yes | |
| SOL | Solomon Islands | (M, W) | | Full | Yes | |
| TGA | Tonga | (M, W) | 2019 | Full | Yes | |

== Competitions ==
=== Baseball ===
Men's

- Oceania Baseball Championship
- U-23 Men's Baseball Oceania Championship
- U-18 Men's Baseball Oceania Championship
- U-15 Men's Baseball Oceania Championship

=== Softball ===
Men's

- Men's Softball Oceania Championship

Women's

- U-18 Women's Softball Oceania Championship

=== Current title holders ===
| Competition | Year | Host country | Champions | Title | Runners-up | Next edition | Dates |
Baseball
| Oceania Baseball Championship | 2007 | None | Australia | 3rd | | TBD | |
| U-23 Men's Baseball Oceania Championship | 2025 | Australia | Australia | 3rd | Guam | TBD | |
| U-18 Men's Baseball Oceania Championship | 2024 | Australia | Australia | 8th | New Zealand | TBD | |
| U-15 Men's Baseball Oceania Championship | 2025 | Guam | Australia | 5th | Northern Mariana Islands | TBD | |
Softball
| Men's Softball Oceania Championship | 2023 | American Samoa | Australia | 1st | New Zealand | TBD | |
| U-23 Men's Softball Oceania Championship | 2025 | New Zealand | New Zealand | 1st | Australia | TBD | |
| U-18 Women's Softball Oceania Championship | 2023 | American Samoa | New Zealand | 1st | Australia | TBD | |

== WBSC World Rankings ==
=== Baseball ===
WBSC Men's Rankings (as of 18 November 2026)
| Oceania* | WBSC | +/- | National Team | Points |
|---|---|---|---|---|
| 1 | 8 | ▲2 | Australia | 2792 |
| 2 | 44 | Steady | Guam | 89 |
| 3 | 60 | Steady | Northern Mariana Islands | 34 |
| 4 | 61 | Steady | New Zealand | 33 |
| 5 | 62 | Steady | Palau | 30 |
| 6 | 84 | Steady | Fiji | 3 |
*Local rankings based on WBSC ranking points

WBSC Women's Rankings (as of 9 September 2026)
| Oceania* | WBSC | +/- | National Team | Points |
|---|---|---|---|---|
| 1 | 7 | ▲3 | Australia | 692 |
*Local rankings based on WBSC ranking points

=== Softball ===
WBSC Men's Softball Rankings (as of 14 May 2026)
| Oceania* | WBSC | +/- | National Team | Points |
|---|---|---|---|---|
| 1 | 7 | Steady | New Zealand | 1884 |
| 2 | 8 | ▼2 | Australia | 1828 |
| 3 | 38 | Steady | American Samoa | 15 |
*Local rankings based on WBSC ranking points

WBSC Women's Rankings (as of 21 October 2026)
| Oceania* | WBSC | +/- | National Team | Points |
|---|---|---|---|---|
| 1 | 11 | Steady | Australia | 1355 |
| 2 | 19 | Steady | New Zealand | 539 |
| 3 | 39 | Steady | American Samoa | 186 |
| 4 | 54 | Steady | Guam | 30 |
| 5 | 55 | Steady | Papua New Guinea | 25 |
| 6 | 56 | Steady | Palau | 19 |
| 7 | 61 | Steady | Federated States of Micronesia | 14 |
| 8 | 65 | Steady | Northern Mariana Islands | 9 |
| 9 | 67 | Steady | Marshall Islands | 4 |
*Local rankings based on WBSC ranking points

=== Baseball5 ===
WBSC Baseball5 Rankings (as of 22 September 2026)
| Oceania* | WBSC | +/- | National Team | Points |
|---|---|---|---|---|
| 1 | 39 | Steady | Australia | 460 |
| 2 | 51 | Steady | Fiji | 252 |
| 3 | 52 | ▼1 | American Samoa | 250 |
| 4 | 65 | Steady | Palau | 100 |
*Local rankings based on WBSC ranking points

=== Historical leaders ===
Highest Ranked Oceania member in the WBSC Rankings

Men's baseball

Women's baseball

Men's softball

Women's softball

== Major tournament records ==
Legend

- 1st – Champion
- 2nd – Runner-up
- 3rd – Third place
- 4th – Fourth place
- QF – Quarter-finals
- R3 – Round 3 (third group stage)
- R2 – Round 2 (second group stage or knockout round)
- R1 – Round 1 (first group stage)
- • — Did not qualify
- × — Did not enter / withdrawn / banned / disqualified
- — Hosts

For each tournament, the flag of the host country and the number of teams in each finals tournament (in brackets) are shown.

=== World Baseball Classic ===
Oceania has sent representatives to the World Baseball Classic six times: Australia competing in all six editions. Of these, only in 2023 did Australia progress beyond the first round.

World Baseball Classic record
| Team | 2006 (Japan) (Puerto Rico) (United States) (16) | 2009 (Canada) (Japan) (Mexico) (Puerto Rico) (United States) (16) | 2013 (Japan) (Puerto Rico) (Taiwan) (United States) (16) | 2017 (Japan) (Mexico) (South Korea) (United States) (16) | 2023 (Japan) (Taiwan) (United States) (20) | 2026 (Japan) (Puerto Rico) (United States) (20) | Years |
|---|---|---|---|---|---|---|---|
| Australia | R1 | R1 | R1 | R1 | QF | R1 | 6 |
| Total (1 team) | 1 | 1 | 1 | 1 | 1 | 1 | 5 |

=== WBSC Premier12 ===
WBSC Premier12 record
| Team | 2015 (Japan) (Taiwan) (12) | 2019 (Japan) (Mexico) (South Korea) (Taiwan) (12) | 2024 (Japan) (Mexico) (Taiwan) (12) | Years |
|---|---|---|---|---|
| Australia | • | R2 | R1; 7th | 2 |
| Total (1 team) | 0 | 1 | 1 | 2 |

=== Women's Baseball World Cup ===
Women's Baseball World Cup record
| Team | 2004 (Canada) (5) | 2006 (Taiwan) (7) | 2008 (Japan) (8) | 2010 (Venezuela) (11) | 2012 (Canada) (8) | 2014 (Japan) (8) | 2016 (South Korea) (12) | 2018 (United States) (12) | 2024 (Canada) (Japan) (12) | Years |
|---|---|---|---|---|---|---|---|---|---|---|
| Australia | 4th | 4th | 4th | 2nd | 4th | 3rd | R2 | R1 | R1 | 9 |
| Total (1 team) | 1 | 1 | 1 | 1 | 1 | 1 | 1 | 1 | 1 | 9 |

=== Olympic Games For Men's Baseball ===
Baseball at the Summer Olympics record
| Team | 1992 (Spain) (8) | 1996 (United States) (8) | 2000 (Australia) (8) | 2004 (Greece) (8) | 2008 (China) (8) | 2020 (Japan) (6) | Years |
|---|---|---|---|---|---|---|---|
| Australia | • | R1; 7th | R1; 7th | 2nd | • | × | 3 |
| Total (1 team) | 0 | 1 | 1 | 1 | 0 | 0 | 3 |

=== Oceania Baseball Championship ===
Oceania Baseball Championship record
| Team | 1999 (Guam) (2) | 2003 (Guam) (2) | 2004 (Australia) (1) | 2007 (Australia) (1) | Years |
|---|---|---|---|---|---|
| American Samoa | 2nd | × | × | × | 2 |
| Australia | × | 1st | 1st | 1st | 3 |
| Guam | 1st | 2nd | × (Note: Guam were scheduled to participate in the 2004 tournament with Australia, but withdrew prior to the start. The BCO awarded the championship to Australia.) | × | 2 |
| New Zealand | × | × | × | × (Note: New Zealand were scheduled to participate in the 2007 tournament with Australia, but withdrew prior to the start. The BCO awarded the championship to Australia.) | 0 |
| Total (3 teams) | 2 | 2 | 1 | 1 | 6 |

=== U-21/U-23 Baseball World Cup ===
U-21/U-23 Baseball World Cup record
| Team | 2014 (Taiwan) (11) | 2016 (Mexico) (12) | 2018 (Colombia) (12) | 2020 (Mexico) (12) | 2022 (Taiwan) (12) | 2024 (China) (12) | 2026 (Nicaragua) (12) | Years |
|---|---|---|---|---|---|---|---|---|
| Australia | R2; 6th | 2nd | R1; 9th | • | R2; 6th | R1; 9th | 2nd | 6 |
| New Zealand | R1; 10th | • | • | • | • | • | • | 1 |
| Total (2 teams) | 2 | 1 | 1 | 0 | 1 | 1 | 1 | 7 |

=== World Junior Baseball Championship/U-18 Baseball World Cup ===
World Junior Baseball Championship/U-18 Baseball World Cup record
| Team | 1981 (United States) (11) | 1982 (United States) | 1983 (United States) | 1984 (Canada) (10) | 1985 (United States) (8) | 1986 (Canada) (7) | 1987 (Canada) (7) | 1988 (Australia) (8) | 1989 (Canada) (12) | 1990 (Cuba) (10) | 1991 (Canada) (12) | 1992 (Mexico) (21) | 1993 (Canada) (8) | 1994 (Canada) (10) | 1995 (United States) | 1996 (Cuba) (10) | 1997 (Canada) (11) | 1999 (Taiwan) (12) | 2000 (Canada) (12) | 2002 (Canada) (12) | 2004 (Taiwan) (11) | 2006 (Cuba) (12) | 2008 (Canada) (12) | 2010 (Canada) (12) | 2012 (South Korea) (12) | 2013 (Taiwan) (12) | 2015 (Japan) (12) | 2017 (Canada) (12) | 2019 (South Korea) (12) | 2022 (United States) (12) | 2023 (Taiwan) (12) | 2025 (Japan) (12) | Years |
|---|---|---|---|---|---|---|---|---|---|---|---|---|---|---|---|---|---|---|---|---|---|---|---|---|---|---|---|---|---|---|---|---|---|
| Australia | 3rd | 3rd | ? | 6th | 8th | 7th | 5th | 4th | 3rd | 7th | 4th | 5th | 5th | 8th | 3rd | • | 6th | 7th | 4th | 7th | 6th | 9th | 4th | 2nd | R1; 9th | R1; 8th | 4th | R2; 5th | 4th | R1; 9th | R1; 10th | R1; 8th | 30 |
| Total (1 team) | 1 | 1 | 0 | 1 | 1 | 1 | 1 | 1 | 1 | 1 | 1 | 1 | 1 | 1 | 1 | 0 | 1 | 1 | 1 | 1 | 1 | 1 | 1 | 1 | 1 | 1 | 1 | 1 | 1 | 1 | 1 | 1 | 30 |

=== World Youth Baseball Championship/U-15 Baseball World Cup ===
World Youth Baseball Championship/U-15 Baseball World Cup record
| Team | 1989 (Japan) (8) | 1990 (Mexico) | 1991 (Australia) | 1993 (Brazil) | 1994 (Mexico) | 1995 (Brazil) | 1996 (Japan) | 1997 (Taiwan) | 1998 (United States) | 2001 (Mexico) | 2003 (Taiwan) | 2005 (Mexico) | 2009 (Taiwan) (12) | 2011 (Mexico) (11) | 2012 (Mexico) (15) | 2014 (Mexico) (18) | 2016 (Japan) (12) | 2018 (Panama) (12) | 2022 (Mexico) (13) | 2024 (Colombia) (12) | 2026 (Mexico) (12) | Years |
|---|---|---|---|---|---|---|---|---|---|---|---|---|---|---|---|---|---|---|---|---|---|---|
| Australia | • | ? | ? | ? | ? | ? | ? | 3rd | ? | 3rd | ? | ? | R1; 9th | R2; 8th | • | R1; 10th | R1; 11th | R1; 9th | • | • | R1; 8th | 8 |
| Guam | • | ? | ? | ? | ? | ? | ? | ? | ? | ? | ? | ? | • | • | • | • | • | • | R1; 12th | R1; 12th | • | 2 |
| New Zealand | • | ? | ? | ? | ? | ? | ? | ? | ? | ? | ? | ? | • | • | • | R1; 15th | R1; 12th | • | • | • | • | 2 |
| Total (3 teams) | 0 | 0 | 0 | 0 | 0 | 0 | 0 | 1 | 0 | 1 | 0 | 0 | 1 | 1 | 0 | 2 | 2 | 1 | 1 | 1 | 1 | 12 |

=== U-12 Baseball World Cup ===
U-12 Baseball World Cup record
| Team | 2011 (Taiwan) (13) | 2013 (Taiwan) (14) | 2015 (Taiwan) (12) | 2017 (Taiwan) (12) | 2019 (Taiwan) (12) | 2021 (Taiwan) (11) | 2023 (Taiwan) (10) | 2025 (Taiwan) (12) | Years |
|---|---|---|---|---|---|---|---|---|---|
| Australia | • | • | R1; 10th | R1; 10th | R1; 10th | • | R1; 11th | R1; 9th | 5 |
| Fiji | • | • | • | • | R1; 12th | • | • | • | 1 |
| New Zealand | • | • | • | • | • | • | R1; 12th | • | 1 |
| Total (3 teams) | 0 | 0 | 1 | 1 | 2 | 0 | 2 | 1 | 7 |

=== Men's Softball World Cup ===
Men's Softball World Cup record
| Team | 1966 (Mexico) (11) | 1968 (United States) (10) | 1972 (Philippines) (10) | 1976 (New Zealand) (7) | 1980 (United States) (14) | 1984 (United States) (16) | 1988 (Canada) (14) | 1992 (Philippines) (18) | 1996 (United States) (22) | 2000 (South Africa) (16) | 2004 (New Zealand) (15) | 2009 (Canada) (16) | 2013 (New Zealand) (16) | 2015 (Canada) (15) | 2017 (Canada) (16) | 2019 (Czech Republic) (16) | 2022 (New Zealand) (12) | 2025 (Canada) (18) | Years |
|---|---|---|---|---|---|---|---|---|---|---|---|---|---|---|---|---|---|---|---|
| Australia | × | × | × | × | × | × | R1; 7th | R1; 5th | R2; 7th | R1; 12th | 3rd | 1st | 3rd | 4th | 2nd | R2; 7th | 1st | R2; 6th | 12 |
| Guam | × | × | R1; 7th | R1; 6th | R1; 8th | R1; 10th | • | R1; 16th | • | • | • | • | • | • | • | • | • | • | 5 |
| New Zealand | 3rd | R1; 5th | 3rd | 1st | 4th | 1st | 2nd | 2nd | 1st | 1st | 1st | 2nd | 1st | 2nd | 1st | 4th | R1; 8th | 2nd | 18 |
| Northern Mariana Islands | × | × | × | × | × | × | × | R1; 13th | R1; 16th | • | • | • | • | • | • | • | • | • | 2 |
| Papua New Guinea | × | × | × | × | R1; 14th | • | • | R1; 17th | R1; 19th | • | • | • | • | • | • | • | • | • | 3 |
| Samoa | × | × | × | × | × | × | × | × | × | × | R2; 6th | • | R2; 7th | • | • | • | • | • | 2 |
| Total (6 teams) | 1 | 1 | 2 | 2 | 3 | 2 | 2 | 5 | 4 | 2 | 3 | 2 | 3 | 2 | 2 | 2 | 2 | 2 | 42 |

=== Women's Softball World Cup ===
Women's Softball World Cup record
| Team | 1965 (Australia) (5) | 1970 (Japan) (9) | 1974 (United States) (15) | 1978 (El Salvador) (15) | 1982 (Taiwan) (23) | 1986 (New Zealand) (12) | 1990 (United States) (20) | 1994 (Canada) (28) | 1998 (Japan) (17) | 2002 (Canada) (16) | 2006 (China) (16) | 2010 (Venezuela) (16) | 2012 (Canada) (16) | 2014 (Netherlands) (16) | 2016 (Canada) (31) | 2018 (Japan) (16) | 2022 (United States) (8) | 2024 (Republic of Ireland) (Italy) (Spain) (18) | 2027 (Australia) (Czech Republic) (Peru) (United States) (18) | Years |
|---|---|---|---|---|---|---|---|---|---|---|---|---|---|---|---|---|---|---|---|---|
| Australia | 1st | 4th | 3rd | 5th | 3rd | 8th | 4th | 3rd | 2nd | R2; 5th | 3rd | R2; 6th | 3rd | 3rd | R1; 10th | 4th | 4th | R2; 7th | Q | 19 |
| Guam | • | • | • | • | R1; 18th | • | • | • | • | • | • | • | • | • | • | • | • | • | • | 1 |
| (Territory of New Guinea) New Guinea | R1; 5th | • | • | Became Papua New Guinea | | | | | | | | | | | | | | | | 1 |
| New Zealand | 4th | R1; 7th | R1; 9th | 3rd | 1st | 3rd | 2nd | R2; 6th | R1; 13th | R2; 6th | R1; 11th | R1; 12th | R1; 13th | R2; 8th | R2; 8th | R1; 13th | • | R1 | Q | 18 |
| Total (4 teams) | 3 | 2 | 2 | 2 | 3 | 2 | 2 | 2 | 2 | 2 | 2 | 2 | 2 | 2 | 2 | 2 | 1 | 2 | 2 | 39 |

=== Olympic Games For Women's Softball ===
Softball at the Summer Olympics record
| Team | 1996 (United States) (8) | 2000 (Australia) (8) | 2004 (Greece) (8) | 2008 (China) (8) | 2020 (Japan) (6) | 2028 (United States) | Years |
|---|---|---|---|---|---|---|---|
| Australia | 3rd | 3rd | 2nd | 3rd | R1; 5th | | 5 |
| New Zealand | • | R1; 6th | • | • | • | | 1 |
| Total (2 teams) | 1 | 2 | 1 | 1 | 1 | | 6 |

=== Men's Softball Oceania Championship ===
Men's Softball Oceania Championship record
| Team | 2023 (American Samoa) (3) | Years |
|---|---|---|
| American Samoa | 3rd | 1 |
| Australia | 1st | 1 |
| New Zealand | 2nd | 1 |
| Total (3 teams) | 3 | 3 |

=== U-23 Men's Softball World Cup ===
U-23 Men's Softball World Cup record
| Team | 2023 (Argentina) (12) | 2026 (Colombia) (12) | Years |
|---|---|---|---|
| Australia | 1st | 2nd | 2 |
| New Zealand | R2; 6th | 4th | 2 |
| Total (2 teams) | 2 | 2 | 4 |

=== Junior Men's Softball World Championship/U-18 Men's Softball World Cup ===
Junior Men's Softball World Championship/U-18 Men's Softball World Cup record
| Team | 1981 (Canada) (5) | 1985 (United States) (8) | 1989 (Canada) (7) | 1993 (New Zealand) (7) | 1997 (Canada) (11) | 2001 (Australia) (10) | 2005 (Canada) (9) | 2008 (Canada) (12) | 2012 (Argentina) (14) | 2014 (Canada) (10) | 2016 (United States) (12) | 2018 (Canada) (13) | 2020 (New Zealand) (12) | 2023 (Mexico) (11) | Years |
|---|---|---|---|---|---|---|---|---|---|---|---|---|---|---|---|
| Australia | × | × | × | 4th | 1st | 1st | 1st | 1st | 3rd | 4th | 6th | 1st | 2nd | R2; 5th | 11 |
| New Zealand | × | 1st | 1st | 2nd | 2nd | 4th | 4th | 4th | 6th | 2nd | 2nd | 3rd | R2; 5th | R1; 9th | 13 |
| Total (2 teams) | 0 | 1 | 1 | 2 | 2 | 2 | 2 | 2 | 2 | 2 | 2 | 2 | 2 | 2 | 24 |

=== Junior Women's Softball World Championship/U-18 Women's Softball World Cup ===
Junior Women's Softball World Championship/U-18 Women's Softball World Cup record
| Team | 1981 (Canada) (10) | 1985 (United States) (8) | 1987 (United States) (10) | 1991 (Australia) (10) | 1995 (United States) (14) | 1999 (Taiwan) (15) | 2003 (China) (14) | 2007 (Netherlands) (16) | 2011 (South Africa) (15) | 2013 (Canada) (15) | 2015 (United States) (15) | 2017 (United States) (26) | 2019 (Note: The 2019 edition was an under-19 tournament before reverting back to under-18 the following edition.) (United States) (16) | 2021 (Peru) (8) | 2025 (United States) (18) | Years |
|---|---|---|---|---|---|---|---|---|---|---|---|---|---|---|---|---|
| Australia | 5th | 5th | 4th | 3rd | 3rd | 6th | 3rd | 3rd | 4th | 3rd | 7th | R2; 7th | 4th | × | R1; 11th | 14 |
| New Zealand | • | • | 8th | 5th | 8th | 9th | 8th | 11th | 6th | 4th | 6th | R1; 16th | R1; 9th | × | R1; 9th | 12 |
| Total (2 teams) | 1 | 1 | 2 | 2 | 2 | 2 | 2 | 2 | 2 | 2 | 2 | 2 | 2 | 0 | 2 | 26 |

=== U-15 Women's Softball World Cup ===
U-15 Women's Softball World Cup record
| Team | 2023 (Japan) (12) | 2025 (Italy) (12) | Years |
|---|---|---|---|
| American Samoa | x | R1; 11th | 1 |
| Australia | x | R1; 8th | 1 |
| New Zealand | R1; 11th | x | 1 |
| Total (3 teams) | 1 | 2 | 3 |

=== Youth Baseball5 World Cup ===
Youth Baseball5 World Cup record
| Team | 2023 (Turkey) (12) | 2025 (Mexico) (16) | Years |
|---|---|---|---|
| Australia | 12th | x | 1 |
| Fiji | x | 15th | 1 |
| Total (2 teams) | 1 | 1 | 2 |

=== Former tournaments ===
==== Amateur World Series/Baseball World Cup ====
Amateur World Series/Baseball World Cup record
| Team | 1938 (United Kingdom) (2) | 1939 (Cuba) (3) | 1940 (Cuba) (7) | 1941 (Cuba) (9) | 1942 (Cuba) (5) | 1943 (Cuba) (4) | 1944 (Venezuela) (8) | 1945 (Venezuela) (6) | 1947 (Colombia) (9) | 1948 (Nicaragua) (8) | 1950 (Nicaragua) (12) | 1951 (Mexico) (11) | 1952 (Cuba) (13) | 1953 (Venezuela) (10) | 1961 (Costa Rica) (10) | 1965 (Colombia) (9) | 1969 (Dominican Republic) (11) | 1970 (Colombia) (11) | 1971 (Cuba) (10) | 1972 (Nicaragua) (16) | 1973 (Cuba) (8) | 1973 (Nicaragua) (11) | 1974 (United States) (9) | 1976 (Colombia) (11) | 1978 (Italy) (11) | 1980 (Japan) (12) | 1982 (South Korea) (10) | 1984 (Cuba) (13) | 1986 (Netherlands) (12) | 1988 (Italy) (12) | 1990 (Canada) (12) | 1994 (Nicaragua) (16) | 1998 (Italy) (16) | 2001 (Taiwan) (16) | 2003 (Cuba) (15) | 2005 (Netherlands) (18) | 2007 (Taiwan) (18) | 2009 (Europe) (22) | 2011 (Panama) (16) | Years |
|---|---|---|---|---|---|---|---|---|---|---|---|---|---|---|---|---|---|---|---|---|---|---|---|---|---|---|---|---|---|---|---|---|---|---|---|---|---|---|---|---|
| Australia | • | • | • | • | • | • | • | • | • | • | • | • | • | • | • | • | • | • | • | • | • | • | • | • | 10th | 10th | 9th | • | • | • | • | R1; 9th | QF; 7th | R1; 10th | • | R1; 10th | QF; 6th | R3; 5th | R2; 5th | 10 |
| Total (1 team) | 0 | 0 | 0 | 0 | 0 | 0 | 0 | 0 | 0 | 0 | 0 | 0 | 0 | 0 | 0 | 0 | 0 | 0 | 0 | 0 | 0 | 0 | 0 | 0 | 1 | 1 | 1 | 0 | 0 | 0 | 0 | 1 | 1 | 1 | 0 | 1 | 1 | 1 | 1 | 10 |

== See also ==
- Oceania Softball Confederation
- Oceania Baseball Championship
- Baseball at the Pacific Games
