= 1995 Junior Women's Softball World Championship =

Tournament details
- Host country: United States
- Dates: June 24 – July 1
- Defending champions: Japan (1991)

Final positions
- Champions: United States (2nd title)
- Runner-up: Japan
- Third place: Australia

The 1995 Junior Women's Softball World Championship was an international softball competition held in Normal, Illinois, United States from June 24–July 1, 1995. It was the fifth edition of the tournament.

== Final standings ==
Rank	Team
1st place, gold medalist(s)	United States
2nd place, silver medalist(s)	Japan
3rd place, bronze medalist(s)	Australia
4	Chinese Taipei
5	Canada
6	China
7	Netherlands
8	New Zealand
9	Italy
10	Argentina
11	South Korea
12	Russia
13	Philippines
14	U.S. Virgin Islands

Source: WBSC
