= 1987 Junior Women's Softball World Championship =

Tournament details
- Host country: United States
- Dates: July 10 – 18
- Defending champions: China (1985)

Final positions
- Champions: United States (1st title)
- Runner-up: China
- Third place: Japan

The 1987 Junior Women's Softball World Championship was an international softball competition held in Oklahoma City, United States from July 10–18, 1987. It was the third edition of the tournament.

== Final standings ==
Rank	Team	Record (W-L)
1st place, gold medalist(s)	United States	10–1
2nd place, silver medalist(s)	China	9–3
3rd place, bronze medalist(s)	Japan	8–3
4	Australia	7–4
5	Chinese Taipei	6–4
6	Netherlands	4–5
7	Canada	3–6
8	New Zealand	2–7
9	Italy	1–8
10	Mexico	0–9

Source: WBSC
