= 2015 Junior Women's Softball World Championship =

Tournament details
- Host country: United States
- Dates: August 9 – 15, 2015
- Teams: 15 (from 5 continents)

Final positions
- Champions: United States (5th title)
- Runner-up: Japan
- Third place: Puerto Rico
- Fourth place: Canada

The 2015 Junior Women's Softball World Championship was an international softball competition held in Oklahoma City, United States from August 9 to 15, 2015. It was the 11th edition of the tournament.

The United States won its fifth title, after defeating Japan 8–1 in the final.

== Final standings ==
Rank	Team
1st place, gold medalist(s)	United States
2nd place, silver medalist(s)	Japan
3rd place, bronze medalist(s)	Puerto Rico
4	Canada
5	Mexico
6	New Zealand
7	Australia
8	Chinese Taipei
9	Italy
10	Brazil
11	Czech Republic
12	China
13	Great Britain
14	Argentina
15	Colombia
