= 2017 Junior Women's Softball World Championship =

Tournament details
- Host country: United States
- Dates: July 24 – 30, 2017
- Teams: 26 (from 5 continents)
- Defending champions: United States

Final positions
- Champions: United States (6th title)
- Runner-up: Japan
- Third place: Puerto Rico

The 2017 Junior Women's Softball World Championship was an international softball competition held in Clearwater, Florida from July 24 to 30, 2017. It was the 12th edition of the tournament.

== Participating teams ==
A total of 26 national youth teams competed in the tournament.

Africa	Americas	Asia	Europe	Oceania
South Africa (-)	United States (2); Canada (3); Puerto Rico (7); Mexico (10); Brazil (11); Guatemala (20); Peru (21); Dominican Republic (24); Argentina (30); Bahamas (-)	Japan (1); China (6); Chinese Taipei (9); Philippines (17); South Korea (26); India (36)	Netherlands (8); Italy (12); Czech Republic (13); Great Britain (14); Ireland (31); Israel (37); Turkey (-)	Australia (4); New Zealand (4)

== Group stage ==
=== Group A ===
Team	W	L	Pct.	GB
United States	6	0	1.000	–
Chinese Taipei	5	1	.833	1
Philippines	4	2	.667	2
Italy	3	3	.500	3
Guatemala	2	4	.333	4
South Africa	1	5	.167	5
Turkey	0	6	.000	6

=== Group B ===
Team	W	L	Pct.	GB
Japan	6	0	1.000	–
Australia	5	1	.833	1
Brazil	4	2	.667	2
Netherlands	3	3	.500	3
Peru	2	4	.333	4
Bahamas	1	5	.167	5
Israel	0	6	.000	6

=== Group C ===
Team	W	L	Pct.	GB
Puerto Rico	5	0	1.000	–
Czech Republic	4	1	.800	1
Dominican Republic	3	2	.600	2
New Zealand	2	3	.400	3
Argentina	1	4	.200	4
India	0	5	.000	5

=== Group D ===
Team	W	L	Pct.	GB
Canada	5	0	1.000	–
China	3	2	.600	2
Mexico	3	2	.600	2
Great Britain	2	3	.400	3
Ireland	1	4	.200	4
South Korea	1	4	.200	4

== 17th–26th place classification ==
=== Round 1 ===
28 July 2017; 12:00	South Korea	14–2	Bahamas

28 July 2017; 14:00	India	5–4	South Africa

=== Round 2 ===
28 July 2017; 17:00	Turkey	0–18	Argentina

28 July 2017; 17:00	South Korea	9–1	Guatemala

28 July 2017; 19:30	Israel	1–16	Ireland

28 July 2017; 19:30	India	1–12	Peru

=== Round 3 ===
29 July 2017; 9:00	Peru	1–5	Ireland

29 July 2017; 9:30	South Korea	7–4	Argentina

=== 17th place match ===
30 July 2017; 12:00	South Korea	14–1	Ireland

== 9th–16th place classification ==
In this round, the eight teams played a Page playoff. The teams placed third in the Group stage will play the Major quarterfinals; the teams placed fourth in the Group stage will play the Minor quarterfinals. The winners of the Minor quarterfinals will play in the Classification round against the losers of the Major quarterfinals.

=== Minor quarterfinals ===
28 July 2017; 11:30	Italy	7–3	New Zealand

28 July 2017; 13:30	Netherlands	2–0	Great Britain

=== Major quarterfinals ===
28 July 2017; 16:30	Brazil	3–10	Mexico

28 July 2017; 19:00	Dominican Republic	3–5	Philippines

=== Classification round ===
29 July 2017; 11:30	Italy	5–4	Brazil

29 July 2017; 14:00	Netherlands	3–5	Dominican Republic

=== Classification round 2 ===
29 July 2017; 17:30	Mexico	1–0	Philippines

=== 11th place match ===
29 July 2017; 19:00	Italy	3–8	Dominican Republic

=== 10th place match ===
30 July 2017; 14:30	Dominican Republic	0–2	Philippines

=== 9th place match ===
30 July 2017; 16:00	Mexico	5–3	Philippines

== Championship round ==
In this round, the eight teams played a Page playoff. The first place teams in the Group stage will play the Major quarterfinals; the second placeteams in the Group stage will play the Minor quarterfinals. The winners of the Minor quarterfinals will play in the Classification round against the losers of the Major quarterfinals.

=== Minor quarterfinals ===
28 July 2017; 12:00	Chinese Taipei	7–6	Czech Republic

28 July 2017; 14:00	China	2–0	Australia

=== Major quarterfinals ===
28 July 2017; 17:00	Canada	7–8	Japan

28 July 2017; 19:30	Puerto Rico	3–8	United States

=== Classification round ===
29 July 2017; 12:00	Chinese Taipei	1–8	Canada

29 July 2017; 14:30	China	0–7	Puerto Rico

=== Major semifinal ===
29 July 2017; 17:00	United States	4–1	Japan

=== Minor semifinal ===
29 July 2017; 19:30	Canada	5–6	Puerto Rico

=== Preliminary semifinal ===
30 July 2017; 14:30	Japan	7–2	Puerto Rico

=== Final ===
30 July 2017; 16:00	United States	13–4	Japan

== Final standings ==
Rank	Team
1st place, gold medalist(s)	United States
2nd place, silver medalist(s)	Japan
3rd place, bronze medalist(s)	Puerto Rico
4	Canada
5	Chinese Taipei
6	China
7	Australia
8	Czech Republic
9	Mexico
10	Philippines
11	Dominican Republic
12	Italy
13	Brazil
14	Netherlands
15	Great Britain
16	New Zealand
17	South Korea
18	Ireland
19	Peru
20	Argentina
21	Guatemala
22	India
23	South Africa
24	Bahamas
25	Turkey
26	Israel
