= Pan American Junior Women's Softball Championship =

- Sport: Softball
- Founded: 2002
- Continent: Pan America
- Most recent champion: United States (3rd title)
- Most titles: United States (3 titles)

The Pan American Junior Women's Softball Championship is the main championship tournament between national women softball teams in Pan America, governed by the Pan American Softball Federation.

== Results ==
Year	Host	Final		Semifinalists	
Year	Host	Champions	Runners-up	3rd place	4th place
2002	(Mexico); Hermosillo	United States	Canada	Argentina	Netherlands Antilles
2006	(Puerto Rico); Maunabo	United States	Puerto Rico	Venezuela	Canada
2010	(Colombia); Bogotá	United States	Canada	Puerto Rico	Brazil

=== Medal table ===
Rank	Nation	Gold	Silver	Bronze	Total
1	United States	3	0	0	3
2	Canada	0	2	0	2
3	Puerto Rico	0	1	1	2
4	Argentina	0	0	1	1
4	Venezuela	0	0	1	1
Totals (5 entries)		3	3	3	9

=== Participating nations ===
Nation	(Mexico) 2002	(Puerto Rico) 2006	(Colombia) 2010	Years
Argentina	3rd	5th	5th	3
Aruba	-	8th	-	1
Brazil	-	-	4th	1
Canada	2nd	4th	2nd	3
Colombia	-	9th	11th	2
Dominican Republic	-	-	6th	1
Ecuador	-	7th	9th	2
Guatemala	6th	-	13th	2
Jamaica	7th	-	-	1
Mexico	5th	-	10th	2
Netherlands Antilles	4th	6th	7th	3
Peru	-	-	12th	1
Puerto Rico	-	2nd	3rd	2
United States	1st	1st	1st	3
Venezuela	-	3rd	8th	2
Total	7	9	13	
