= 2019 WBSC U-19 Women's Softball World Cup =

Tournament details
- Host country: United States
- Dates: August 10 – 17, 2019
- Teams: 16 (from 5 continents)

Final positions
- Champions: United States (7th title)
- Runner-up: Japan
- Third place: Canada
- Fourth place: Australia

The 2019 WBSC U-19 Women's Softball World Cup was an international softball competition held in Irvine, California from August 10 to 17, 2019. It was the 13th edition of the tournament.

The United States won its seventh title, after defeating Japan 4–3 in final.

== First round ==
=== Group A ===
Pos	Team	Pld	W	L	RF	RA	RD	PCT	GB	Qualification
1	United States (H)	3	3	0	38	0	+38	1.000	—	Advance to Super Round
2	Mexico	3	2	1	13	15	−2	.667	1	Advance to Super Round
3	Czech Republic	3	1	2	11	9	+2	.333	2	Advance to Placement Round
4	Botswana	3	0	3	0	38	−38	.000	3	Advance to Placement Round

First match(es) will be played: 11 August 2019. Source: WBSC
Rules for classification: 1) Wins/losses; 2) Head to head; 3) Head to head runs against; 4) Runs against; 5) Head to head
(H) Hosts

Date	Local time	Road team	Score	Home team	Inn.	Venue	Game duration	Attendance	Boxscore
Aug 11, 2019	11:00	United States	15–0	Mexico					Boxscore
Aug 12, 2019	08:30	Czech Republic	0–1	Mexico					Boxscore
Aug 12, 2019	11:00	Botswana	0–15	United States					Boxscore
Aug 13, 2019	03:30	Botswana	0–11	Czech Republic					Boxscore
Aug 13, 2019	08:30	Mexico	12–0	Botswana					Boxscore
Aug 13, 2019	11:00	Czech Republic	0–8	United States					Boxscore

=== Group B ===
Pos	Team	Pld	W	L	RF	RA	RD	PCT	GB	Qualification
1	Japan	3	3	0	26	2	+24	1.000	—	Advance to Super Round
2	Australia	3	2	1	15	8	+7	.667	1	Advance to Super Round
3	Italy	3	1	2	10	13	−3	.333	2	Advance to Placement Round
4	South Africa	3	0	3	1	29	−28	.000	3	Advance to Placement Round

First match(es) will be played: 12 August 2019. Source: WBSC
Rules for classification: 1) Wins/losses; 2) Head to head; 3) Head to head runs against; 4) Runs against; 5) Head to head

Date	Local time	Road team	Score	Home team	Inn.	Venue	Game duration	Attendance	Boxscore
Aug 12, 2019	01:00	South Africa	1–8	Japan					Boxscore
Aug 12, 2019	06:00	Japan	8–1	Australia					Boxscore
Aug 12, 2019	06:00	South Africa	0–10	Italy					Boxscore
Aug 13, 2019	01:00	Australia	11–0	South Africa					Boxscore
Aug 13, 2019	01:00	Italy	0–10	Japan					Boxscore
Aug 13, 2019	06:00	Italy	0–3	Australia					Boxscore

=== Group C ===
Pos	Team	Pld	W	L	RF	RA	RD	PCT	GB	Qualification
1	Puerto Rico	3	3	0	24	3	+21	1.000	—	Advance to Super Round
2	China	3	2	1	14	9	+5	.667	1	Advance to Super Round
3	Brazil	3	1	2	8	12	−4	.333	2	Advance to Placement Round
4	Ireland	3	0	3	4	26	−22	.000	3	Advance to Placement Round

First match(es) will be played: 11 August 2019. Source: WBSC
Rules for classification: 1) Wins/losses; 2) Head to head; 3) Head to head runs against; 4) Runs against; 5) Head to head

Date	Local time	Road team	Score	Home team	Inn.	Venue	Game duration	Attendance	Boxscore
Aug 11, 2019	11:00	Puerto Rico	8–0	Brazil					Boxscore
Aug 12, 2019	01:00	Ireland	3–8	China					Boxscore
Aug 12, 2019	08:30	Brazil	7–1	Ireland					Boxscore
Aug 12, 2019	11:00	China	3–5	Puerto Rico					Boxscore
Aug 13, 2019	03:30	Ireland	0–11	Puerto Rico					Boxscore
Aug 13, 2019	06:00	Brazil	1–3	China					Boxscore

=== Group D ===
Pos	Team	Pld	W	L	RF	RA	RD	PCT	GB	Qualification
1	Canada	3	3	0	19	3	+16	1.000	—	Advance to Super Round
2	Chinese Taipei	3	2	1	16	13	+3	.667	1	Advance to Super Round
3	New Zealand	3	1	2	16	17	−1	.333	2	Advance to Placement Round
4	Netherlands	3	0	3	0	18	−18	.000	3	Advance to Placement Round

First match(es) will be played: 11 August 2019. Source: WBSC
Rules for classification: 1) Wins/losses; 2) Head to head; 3) Head to head runs against; 4) Runs against; 5) Head to head

Date	Local time	Road team	Score	Home team	Inn.	Venue	Game duration	Attendance	Boxscore
Aug 11, 2019	23:00	Netherlands	0–2	Canada					Boxscore
Aug 11, 2019	23:00	Chinese Taipei	7–6	New Zealand					Boxscore
Aug 12, 2019	03:30	Canada	7–0	Chinese Taipei					Boxscore
Aug 12, 2019	03:30	New Zealand	7–0	Netherlands					Boxscore
Aug 13, 2019	08:30	New Zealand	3–10	Canada					Boxscore
Aug 13, 2019	11:00	Netherlands	0–9	Chinese Taipei					Boxscore

== Super Round ==
Pos	Team	Pld	W	L	RF	RA	RD	PCT	GB	Qualification
1	United States (H)	6	6	0	41	0	+41	1.000	—	Advance to Final
2	Japan	6	5	1	43	2	+41	.833	1	Advance to Final
3	Canada	6	4	2	21	26	−5	.667	2	Advance to Third place play-off
4	Australia	6	3	3	23	28	−5	.500	3	Advance to Third place play-off
5	Chinese Taipei	6	3	3	17	32	−15	.500	3	
6	Mexico	6	2	4	10	18	−8	.333	4	
7	Puerto Rico	6	1	5	11	39	−28	.167	5	
8	China	6	0	6	6	25	−19	.000	6	

First match(es) will be played: 14 August 2019. Source: WBSC
Rules for classification: 1) Wins/losses; 2) Head to head; 3) Head to head runs against; 4) Runs against; 5) Head to head
(H) Hosts

Date	Local time	Road team	Score	Home team	Inn.	Venue	Game duration	Attendance	Boxscore
Aug 14, 2019	01:00	Mexico	1–2	Chinese Taipei					Boxscore
Aug 14, 2019	03:30	Japan	10–0	Puerto Rico					Boxscore
Aug 14, 2019	06:00	Mexico	0–4	Canada					Boxscore
Aug 14, 2019	08:30	Chinese Taipei	0–9	Japan					Boxscore
Aug 14, 2019	08:30	Australia	4–2	China					Boxscore
Aug 14, 2019	11:00	United States	12–0	Canada					Boxscore
Aug 15, 2019	01:00	Australia	1–5	Mexico					Boxscore
Aug 15, 2019	03:30	China	1–6	Japan					Boxscore
Aug 15, 2019	06:00	Chinese Taipei	9–1	Puerto Rico					Boxscore
Aug 15, 2019	08:30	Canada	0–7	Japan					Boxscore
Aug 15, 2019	11:00	Puerto Rico	0–6	United States					Boxscore
Aug 16, 2019	01:00	China	3–5	Canada					Boxscore
Aug 16, 2019	03:30	Australia	6–2	Puerto Rico					Boxscore
Aug 16, 2019	06:00	Chinese Taipei	0–7	United States					Boxscore
Aug 16, 2019	08:30	China	0–1	Mexico					Boxscore
Aug 16, 2019	08:30	Australia	0–7	Canada					Boxscore
Aug 16, 2019	11:00	Japan	0–1	United States					Boxscore
Aug 17, 2019	03:30	Mexico	3–4	Puerto Rico					Boxscore
Aug 17, 2019	06:00	China	0–6	United States					Boxscore
Aug 17, 2019	06:00	Australia	12–3	Chinese Taipei					Boxscore
Aug 17, 2019	08:30	Mexico	0–11	Japan					Boxscore
Aug 17, 2019	08:30	Canada	5–4	Puerto Rico					Boxscore
Aug 17, 2019	11:00	Australia	0–9	United States					Boxscore
Aug 17, 2019	11:00	Chinese Taipei	3–2	China					Boxscore

== Placement Round ==
Pos	Team	Pld	W	L	RF	RA	RD	PCT	GB
1	Netherlands	3	3	0	26	9	+17	1.000	—
2	New Zealand	3	3	0	15	8	+7	1.000	—
3	Czech Republic	3	2	1	18	7	+11	.667	1
4	Ireland	3	2	1	18	9	+9	.667	1
5	Italy	3	1	2	13	15	−2	.333	2
6	South Africa	3	1	2	2	25	−23	.333	2
7	Botswana	3	0	3	17	28	−11	.000	3
8	Brazil	3	0	3	6	22	−16	.000	3

First match(es) will be played: 14 August 2019. Source: WBSC
Rules for classification: 1) Wins/losses; 2) Head to head; 3) Head to head runs against; 4) Runs against; 5) Head to head

Date	Local time	Road team	Score	Home team	Inn.	Venue	Game duration	Attendance	Boxscore
Aug 14, 2019	01:00	Botswana	7–8	South Africa					Boxscore
Aug 14, 2019	03:30	Brazil	2–3	New Zealand					Boxscore
Aug 14, 2019	06:00	Netherlands	6–0	Ireland					Boxscore
Aug 14, 2019	11:00	Czech Republic	6–0	Italy					Boxscore
Aug 15, 2019	03:30	Netherlands	12–7	Botswana					Boxscore
Aug 15, 2019	06:00	Brazil	1–9	Italy					Boxscore
Aug 15, 2019	08:30	New Zealand	4–2	Czech Republic					Boxscore
Aug 15, 2019	11:00	South Africa	0–10	Ireland					Boxscore
Aug 16, 2019	01:00	Brazil	3–10	Czech Republic					Boxscore
Aug 16, 2019	03:30	Netherlands	8–2	South Africa					Boxscore
Aug 16, 2019	06:00	Botswana	3–8	Ireland					Boxscore
Aug 16, 2019	11:00	New Zealand	8–4	Italy					Boxscore

== Third place play-off ==
18 August 2019 02:00
Team	1	2	3	4	5	6	7	R	H	E
Australia	0	0	2	0	0	2	0	4	11	2
Canada	2	1	0	0	2	0	X	5	5	1
Boxscore

== Final ==
18 August 2019 05:00
Team	1	2	3	4	5	6	7	8	R	H	E
Japan	0	0	0	0	0	0	0	3	3	6	1
United States	0	0	0	0	0	0	0	4	4	7	2
Boxscore

== Final standings ==
Rank	Team
1st place, gold medalist(s)	United States
2nd place, silver medalist(s)	Japan
3rd place, bronze medalist(s)	Canada
4	Australia
5	Chinese Taipei
6	Puerto Rico
7	Mexico
8	China
9	New Zealand
10	Czech Republic
11	Italy
12	Brazil
13	Netherlands
14	Ireland
15	South Africa
16	Botswana
