= South American Junior Women's Softball Championship =

- Sport: Softball
- Continent: South America

The South American Junior Women's Softball Championship is the main championship tournament between national women softball teams in South America, governed by the Pan American Softball Federation.

== Results ==
Year	Host	Final		Semifinalists	
Year	Host	Champions	Runners-up	3rd place	4th place
2002	(Ecuador); Guayaquil	Brazil	Peru	Ecuador	Argentina
2003	(Peru); Lima	Brazil	Argentina	Ecuador	Peru
2004	(Venezuela); Caracas	Venezuela	Brazil	Argentina	Ecuador
2008	(Venezuela); Maracay	Brazil	Venezuela	Argentina	Colombia
2011	(Venezuela); Maracay	Venezuela	Brazil	Ecuador	Colombia

=== Medal table ===
Rank	Nation	Gold	Silver	Bronze	Total
1	Brazil	3	2	0	5
2	Venezuela	2	1	0	3
3	Argentina	0	1	1	2
4	Peru	0	1	0	1
5	Ecuador	0	0	2	2
Totals (5 entries)		5	5	3	13

=== Participating nations ===
Nation	(Ecuador) 2002	(Peru) 2003	(Venezuela) 2004	(Venezuela) 2008	(Venezuela) 2011	Years
Argentina	4th	2nd	3rd	3rd	-	4
Brazil	1st	1st	2nd	1st	2nd	5
Colombia	-	-	-	4th	4th	2
Ecuador	3rd	3rd	4th	5th	3rd	5
Peru	2nd	4th	-	-	-	2
Venezuela	-	-	1st	2nd	1st	3
Total	4	4	4	5	4	
