= U-18 Women's Softball World Cup =

- Current season, competition or edition: 2025 U-18 Women's Softball World Cup
- Sport: Softball
- Founded: 1981
- Continent: International
- Most recent champion: United States (9th title)
- Most titles: United States (9 titles)
- Website: Official website

The U-18 Women's Softball World Cup is a fastpitch softball tournament for age 18-and-under national teams held by the World Baseball Softball Confederation (WBSC). Prior to the 2021 edition, the tournament was an under-19 tournament.

The latest edition of the WBSC U-18 Women's Softball World Cup was played in Lima, Peru in December 2021, with the United States claiming their fourth consecutive women's youth softball world title, and eighth overall, following a dramatic 1–0 win against Chinese Taipei in the final. This tournament was rescheduled due to the COVID-19 pandemic, originally scheduled for 2020.

The tournament, with a history of 42 years and 14 editions, moved to a four-year cycle and changed its competition format from 2024. The Group Stage will be held between July and September 2024 in São Paulo, Pingtan and Dallas. The Finals will be held in 2025 in the North American city itself.

== Classification ==
With the approved format of 18 national teams, the WBSC has distributed the continental quotas as follows:

- WBSC Africa: 2 spots
- WBSC Americas: 5 spots
- WBSC Asia: 3 spots
- WBSC Europe: 3 spots
- WBSC Oceania: 2 spots
- Wild cards: 3 spots (including hosts if necessary)

The participants will be determined through the continental championships.

== Results ==
Ed.	Years	Final hosts	Finalists			Semi-finalists			Teams
Ed.	Years	Final hosts	Champions	Score	Runners-up	3rd place	Score	4th place	Teams
Jr. Women's Softball World Championship
1	1981; Details	(Canada); Edmonton	Japan	1–0	United States	China		Canada	10
2	1985; Details	(United States); Fargo	China	1–0	Japan	United States		Chinese Taipei	8
3	1987; Details	(United States); Oklahoma City	United States	1–0	China	Japan		Australia	10
4	1991; Details	(Australia); Adelaide	Japan	1–0	United States	Australia		China	12
5	1995; Details	(United States); Normal	United States	3–0	Japan	Australia		Chinese Taipei	14
6	1999; Details	(Taiwan); Taipei	Japan	3–1	United States	Chinese Taipei		China	15
7	2003; Details	(China); Nanjing	Japan	3–2	United States	Australia		China	14
8	2007; Details	(Netherlands); Enschede	United States	3–1	Japan	Australia		Venezuela	16
9	2011; Details	(South Africa); Cape Town	United States	4–1	Japan	Chinese Taipei		Australia	15
10	2013; Details	(Canada); Brampton	Japan	4–0	United States	Australia		New Zealand	15
11	2015; Details	(United States); Oklahoma City	United States	8–1	Japan	Puerto Rico		Canada	15
12	2017; Details	(United States); Clearwater	United States	13–4	Japan	Puerto Rico		Canada	26
U-19 Women's Softball World Cup
13	2019; Details	(United States); Irvine	United States	4–3	Japan	Canada	5–4	Australia	16
U-18 Women's Softball World Cup
14	2021; Details (Note: Originally scheduled to be held in 2020, but due to the COVID-19 pandemic, postponed to December 2021.)	(Peru); Lima	United States	1–0	Chinese Taipei	Puerto Rico	4–0	Mexico	8
15	2025; Details	(United States); Oklahoma City	United States	7–2	Japan	Mexico	4–2	China	18

== Medal table ==
Rank	Nation	Gold	Silver	Bronze	Total
1	United States	9	5	1	15
2	Japan	5	8	1	14
3	China	1	1	1	3
4	Chinese Taipei	0	1	2	3
5	Australia	0	0	5	5
6	Puerto Rico	0	0	3	3
7	Canada	0	0	1	1
7	Mexico	0	0	1	1
Totals (8 entries)		15	15	15	45

== Participating nations ==
- 1st — Champion
- 2nd — Runner-up
- 3rd — Third place
- — Host nation

Nation	1981	1985	1987	1991	1995	1999	2003	2007	2011	2013	2015	2017	2019	2021	2025	Years
Argentina	—	—	—	—	10th	15th	11th	10th	11th	—	14th	20th	—	—	—	7
Australia	6th	5th	4th	3rd	3rd	6th	3rd	3rd	4th	3rd	7th	7th	4th	—	—	13
Bahamas	—	—	—	—	—	—	—	—	—	—	—	24th	—	—	—	1
Bermuda	8th	—	—	—	—	—	—	—	—	—	—	—	—	—	—	1
Botswana	—	—	—	—	—	—	—	16th	15th	15th	—	—	16th	—	—	4
Brazil	—	—	—	—	—	10th	—	—	7th	7th	10th	13th	12th	—	—	6
Canada	4th	7th	7th	7th	5th	7th	6th	5th	5th	5th	4th	4th	3rd	—	5th	14
China	3rd	1st	2nd	4th	6th	4th	4th	9th	8th	8th	12th	6th	8th	—	4th	14
Chinese Taipei	5th	4th	5th	6th	4th	3rd	5th	8th	3rd	—	8th	5th	5th	2nd	8th	14
Colombia	—	—	—	—	—	—	—	—	—	—	15th	—	—	8th	—	2
Czech Republic	—	—	—	11th	—	13th	12th	—	9th	13th	11th	8th	10th	5th	6th	10
Dominican Republic	—	—	—	—	—	—	—	—	—	—	—	11th	—	—	—	1
Great Britain	—	—	—	—	—	—	—	—	—	9th	13th	15th	—	—	—	3
Germany	—	—	—	—	—	—	—	14th	14th	—	—	—	—	—	—	2
Guatemala	—	—	—	—	—	—	—	—	—	—	—	21st	—	—	—	1
India	—	—	—	—	—	—	—	—	—	—	—	22nd	—	—	—	1
Ireland	—	—	—	—	—	—	—	—	—	—	—	18th	14th	—	—	2
Israel	—	—	—	—	—	—	—	—	—	—	—	26th	—	—	—	1
Italy	—	—	9th	10th	9th	11th	—	12th	—	—	9th	12th	11th	—	—	8
Japan	1st	2nd	3rd	1st	2nd	1st	1st	2nd	2nd	1st	2nd	2nd	2nd	—	2nd	14
Mexico	9th	8th	10th	—	—	—	—	—	—	12th	5th	9th	7th	4th	3rd	9
Netherlands	7th	6th	6th	8th	7th	12th	10th	6th	—	10th	—	14th	13th	7th	—	12
New Zealand	—	—	8th	5th	8th	9th	8th	11th	6th	4th	6th	16th	9th	—	—	11
Peru	—	—	—	—	—	—	—	—	—	—	—	19th	—	6th	—	2
Philippines	—	—	—	12th	13th	—	9th	—	—	—	—	10th	—	—	—	4
Puerto Rico	—	—	—	—	—	—	—	7th	10th	6th	3rd	3rd	6th	3rd	7th	8
Russia	—	—	—	—	12th	8th	7th	13th	12th	—	—	—	—	—	—	5
Singapore	—	—	—	—	—	—	—	—	14th	—	—	—	—	—	—	1
South Africa	—	—	—	—	—	—	—	15th	13th	—	—	23rd	15th	—	—	4
South Korea	—	—	—	9th	11th	14th	13th	—	—	11th	—	17th	—	—	—	6
Thailand	—	—	—	—	—	—	14th	—	—	—	—	—	—	—	—	1
Turkey	—	—	—	—	—	—	—	—	—	—	—	25th	—	—	—	1
United States	2nd	3rd	1st	2nd	1st	2nd	2nd	1st	1st	2nd	1st	1st	1st	1st	1st	15
U.S. Virgin Islands	—	—	—	—	14th	—	—	—	—	—	—	—	—	—	—	1
Venezuela	10th	—	—	—	—	5th	—	4th	—	—	—	—	—	—	—	3
Total Nations	10	8	10	12	14	15	14	16	15	15	15	26	16	8	8	

== See also ==
- U-18 Men's Softball World Cup
