= Lexi Kilfoyl =

American softball player (born 2001)

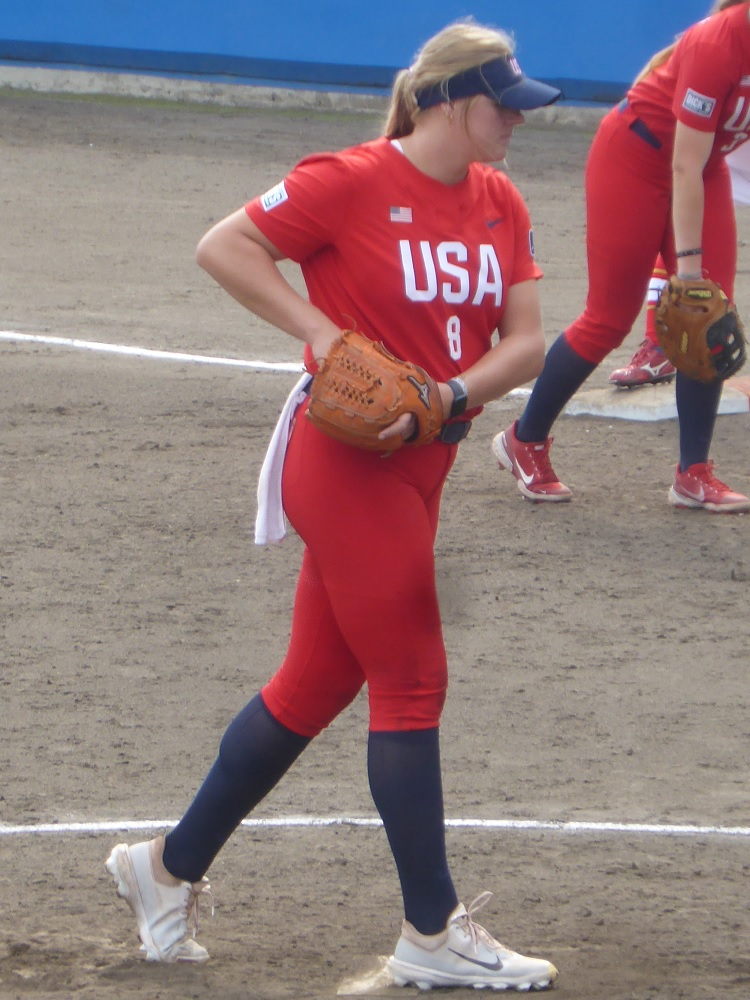
- Kilfoyl in 2024

Chicago Bandits
- Pitcher
- Born: May 30, 2001 (age 25); Land O' Lakes, Florida, U.S.

Teams
- Alabama (2020–2022); Oklahoma State (2023–2024); Chicago Bandits (2025–present)

Career highlights and awards
- Big 12 Pitcher of the Year (2024); First Team All-American (2024); First team All-Big 12 (2024)

Alexis Olivia Kilfoyl (born May 30, 2001) is an American professional softball pitcher for the Chicago Bandits of the Athletes Unlimited Softball League (AUSL). She was drafted first overall in the 2025 AUSL draft. She played college softball at Alabama and Oklahoma State.

== High school career ==
Kilfoyl began playing softball at eight years old. She attended Academy at the Lakes in Land O' Lakes, Florida. During the 2018 season, in her junior year, she posted a 23–1 record with a 0.32 earned run average (ERA), and 249 strikeouts in 154 innings, as she led the Wildcats to the Class 2A state championship. Offensively she hit .482 with five home runs and 35 run batted in (RBIs), a .585 on-base percentage and a .788 slugging percentage. Following the season she was named the Florida Gatorade Player of the Year. She was also named the 2018 Class 2A Player of the Year.

During the 2019 season, in her senior year, she missed a month of action due to a shoulder injury and posted a 14–1 record with a 0.48 ERA, and 134 strikeouts in 73 innings, as she led the Wildcats to the Class 2A state championship for the second consecutive year. Offensively she hit .563 with 12 home runs and 37 RBIs, a .653 on-base percentage and a 1.188 slugging percentage. Following the season she was named the Florida Gatorade Player of the Year for the second consecutive year.

== College career ==
=== Alabama ===
Kilfoyl began her college softball career at Alabama in 2020 season. During her freshman year, she appeared in 13 games, including eight starts, before the season was shortened due to the COVID-19 pandemic. On February 7, 2020, she earned a win in her collegiate debut against North Carolina, with seven strikeouts in six innings. On February 13, 2020, she pitched a complete-game shutout against No. 1 Washington, as she allowed just one hit with six strikeouts, in a five-inning, run-rule victory. She made three more relief appearances over the weekend, where she pitched a combined nine innings with five runs allowed and eight strikeouts. She was subsequently named the SEC Freshman of the Week.

During the 2021 season in her sophomore year, she appeared in 32 games, including 27 starts, and posted a 13–4 record with a 2.08 ERA, 131 strikeouts, and one save in 104 innings. On February 27, 2021, she pitched her first career no-hitter against North Carolina, allowing just one walk with eight strikeouts. She also had an RBI-double for her first hit of the season. On March 12, 2021, she recorded a then career-high ten strikeouts in a game against Auburn. She was subsequently named inaugural Newcomer of the Week, an award created specifically for the spring 2021 season to honor athletes who were freshmen during the shortened 2020 season. On April 24, 2021, she hit her first career home run in a game against Louisiana. On May 21, 2021, during the opening round of the 2021 NCAA Division I softball tournament against Alabama State, she recorded a career-high 15 strikeouts in a combined no-hitter. On May 29, 2021, during the Tuscaloosa Super Regional against Kentucky, she pitched a complete game allowing just one run on five hits, all singles, with seven strikeouts, and helped Alabama advance to the Women's College World Series.

During the 2022 season in her junior year, she appeared in 18 games, including 13 starts, and posted a 9–3 record with a 3.04 ERA and 79 strikeouts in 80 innings. On April 4, 2022, in a game against Georgia, she pitched her first career perfect game, and sixth perfect game in program history. She finished the game with a season-high ten strikeouts. She was subsequently named SEC Pitcher of the Week. In March 2022, she injured her foot and spent weeks in a walking boot, which began to cause pain in her hip. In June 2023, she underwent surgery for a torn labrum in her hip.

=== Oklahoma State ===
On June 30, 2022, Kilfoyl transferred to Oklahoma State. During the 2023 season in her senior year, she appeared in 31 games, including 19 starts, and posted a 16–5 record with a 2.19 ERA and 130 strikeouts in 139 2/3 innings. She tied Kelly Maxwell for the team lead with 16 wins and led the Cowgirls in ERA and complete games. On March 7, 2023, she pitched her third career no-hitter with 11 strikeouts in a five-inning, run-rule victory against Maine. She was subsequently named Big 12 Pitcher of the Week. On May 25, 2023, during game one of the Stillwater Super Regional against Oregon, she retired the final 17 batters she faced, and helped Oklahoma State advance to the Women's College World Series.

During the 2024 season in graduate student year, she appeared in 39 games, including 24 starts, and posted a 26–5 record with a 1.20 ERA and 152 strikeouts in 180 2/3 innings. She ranked fourth in the nation in ERA and sixth in wins. She led the Big 12 in ERA, wins, shutouts (seven), walks allowed per seven innings (1.36), strikeout-to-walk ratio (4.34) and complete games (18), and ranked second in strikeouts (114) and opponent batting average (.172). Following an outstanding season, she was named Big 12 Pitcher of the Year. She became the first player in program history to be named a top three finalist for the USA Softball Collegiate Player of the Year. During the 2024 NCAA Division I softball tournament, she posted a 5–0 record during Regional and Super Regional play, with a 0.75 ERA and 27 strikeouts in 28 innings, and helped Oklahoma State advance to the Women's College World Series for the fifth consecutive year.

== Professional career ==
On January 29, 2025, Kilfoyl was drafted first overall by the Bandits in the inaugural AUSL draft. On June 7, 2025, during the first game of the season against the Talons, Kilfoyl earned the first win in AUSL history.

== International career ==
Kilfoyl represented the United States at the 2017 Junior Women's Softball World Championship and won a gold medal. She again represented the United States at the 2019 WBSC U-19 Women's Softball World Cup where she posted a 2–0 record with eight strikeouts, and allowed only two hits in 7 1/3 innings and won a gold medal. On August 3, 2026, she won a gold medal representing the United States at the USA Softball International Cup.

== Personal life ==
Kilfoyl was born to Darin and Christine Kilfoyl, and has one sister, Kaela, and three brothers, Kasey, Darin and Andrew. Darin played college baseball at St. Johns River State and the University of North Florida. Andrew played college football at the University of South Florida and Bowling Green State University.
