= Pingtan Softball Stadium =

Sports venue in Fujian, China

- 平潭垒球馆
- Interactive map of Pingtan Softball Stadium
- Address: Pingtan County, Fujian; China
- Coordinates: 25°32′32.8″N 119°45′05.2″E
- Capacity: 5,000

Construction
- Built: 2015

Pingtan Softball Stadium (Chinese: 平潭垒球馆) is a ballpark in Pingtan County, Fujian, China

== Background ==
The Pingtan Softball Stadium was completed on 18 September 2015, in time for the inaugural National Youth Games in October 2015.

It has hosted the 2023 U-18 Women's Softball Asia Cup and the 2025 U-18 Women's Softball World Cup.

The Pingtan Softball Stadium consists of two fields for softball and baseball; a primary field for competition use and a training base. It has a grandstand is patterned after a boat as a reference to Pingtan being coastal city. It has a seating capacity to accommodate 5,000 people.

A separate venue, (Note: Situated at 25°34′50.1″N 119°44′39.7″E) the Pingtan Baseball Park was constructed in August 2024.
