= Estádio Municipal de Beisebol Mie Nishi =

Baseball stadium in São Paulo, Brazil

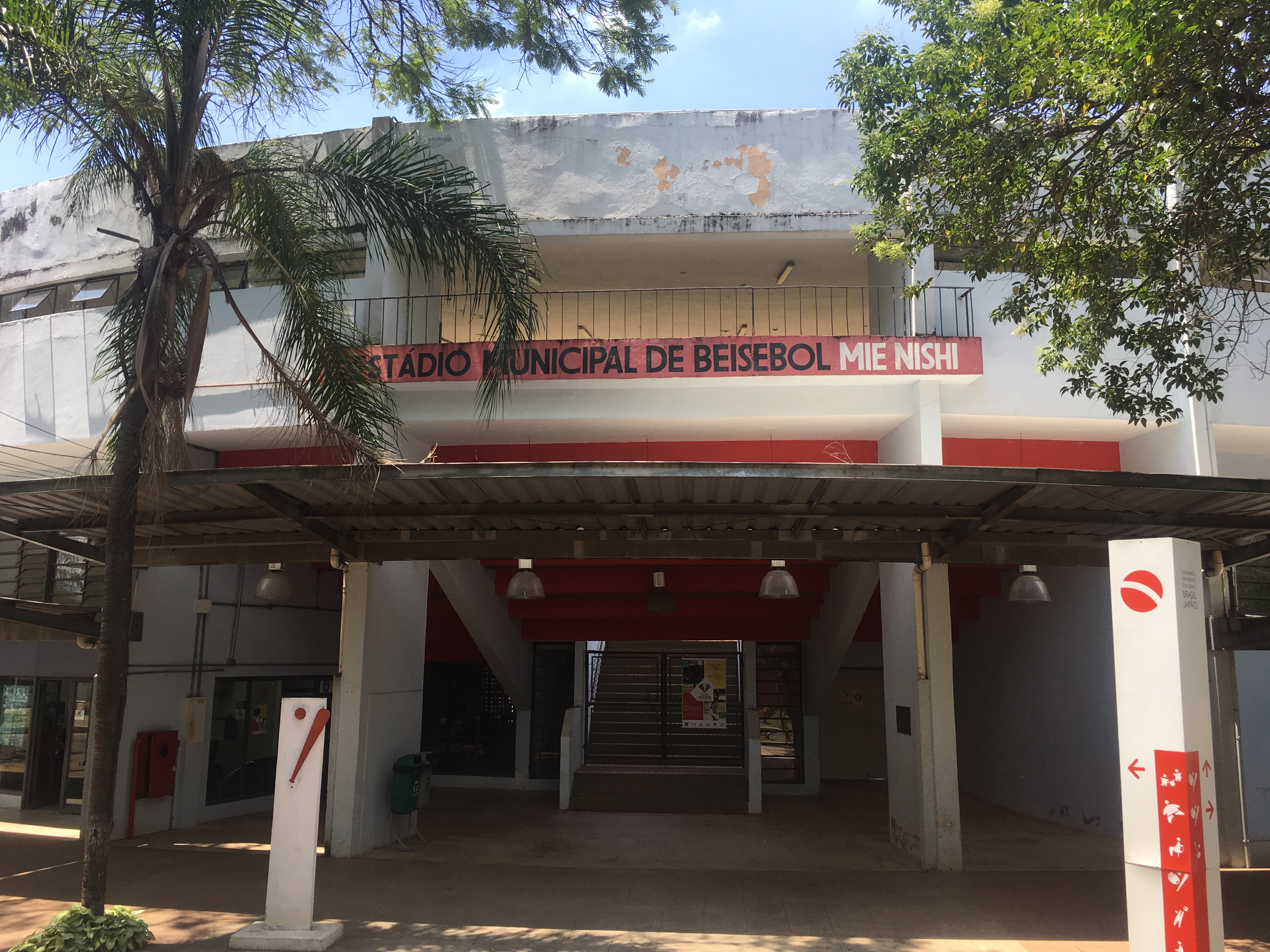

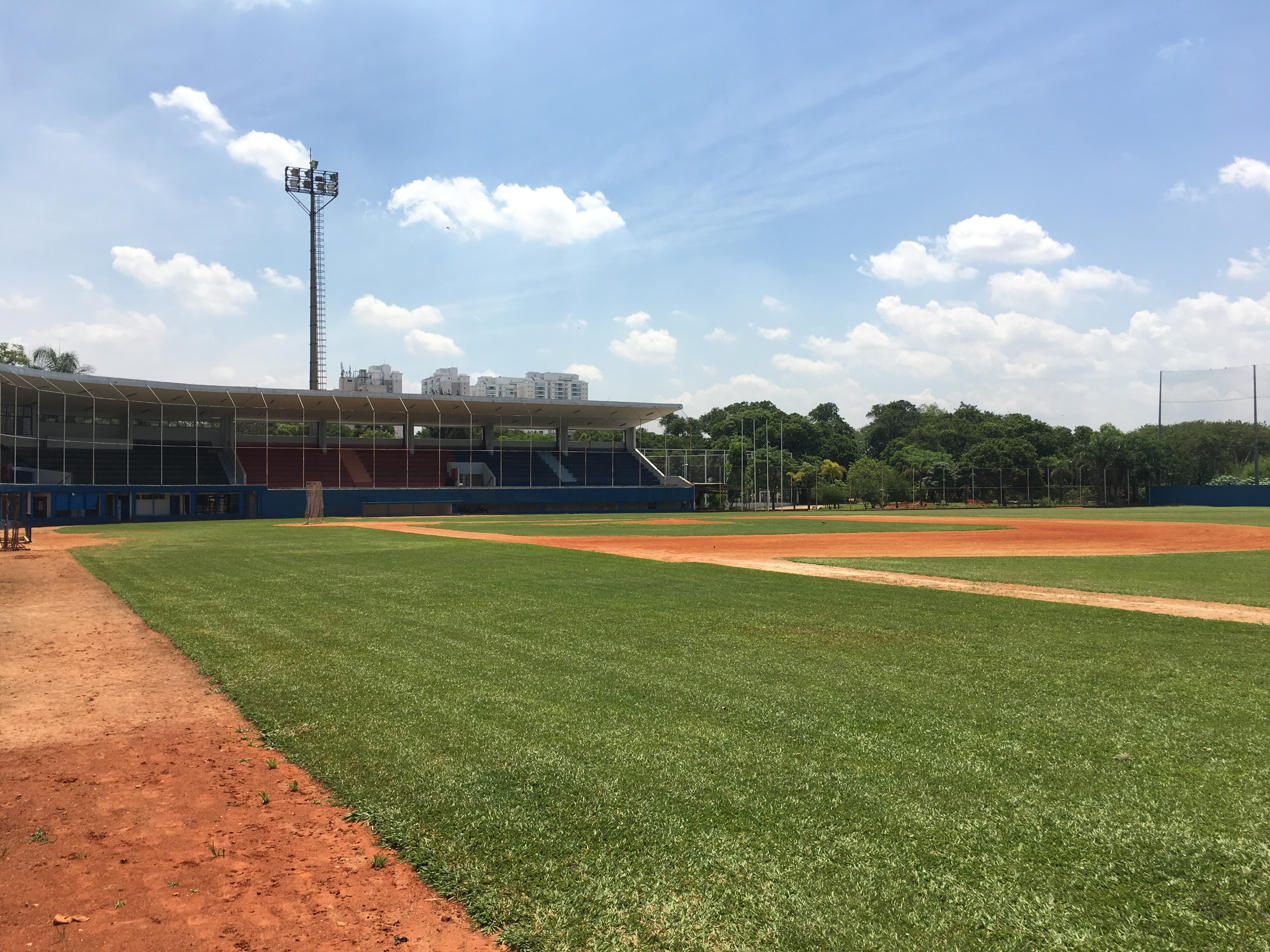
- Address: São Paulo; Brazil
- Coordinates: 23°31′13.0″S 46°38′31.2″W
- Owner: São Paulo City
- Capacity: 2500
- Surface: Natural Grass (1958-2024); Artificial Turf (2024-)

Construction
- Opened: 21 June 1958
- Renovated: 1962,2024

Estádio Municipal de Beisebol Mie Nishi (transl. Mie Nishi Municipal Baseball Stadium) is a sports venue located in the Bom Retiro district of São Paulo, Brazil. It was opened on 21 June 1958 in commemoration of the 50th anniversary of the Japanese immigration in Brazil. It is under the Department of Sports, Leisure and Recreation of the city of São Paulo and is the only public-owned venue in the country for practicing baseball, it is also the first baseball stadium with floodlights in the country. The stadium hosts various baseball/softball events, such as friendly games, national tournaments, international tournaments, and training for around 20 baseball teams of all age levels.

The stadium also features a complex with areas for cultural events, gateball and sumo, in addition to a dedicated space for softball practice. This comple is also notable for being home to the only sumo training center built outside Japan.

Currently, the 30,000 square metres (320,000 sq ft) complex, is used for training and sporting activities for the all ages, sumo training and free classes on all sports feaured in the complex there. In addition, international sumo competitions are hosted in the training center in the complex.

== Gallery ==
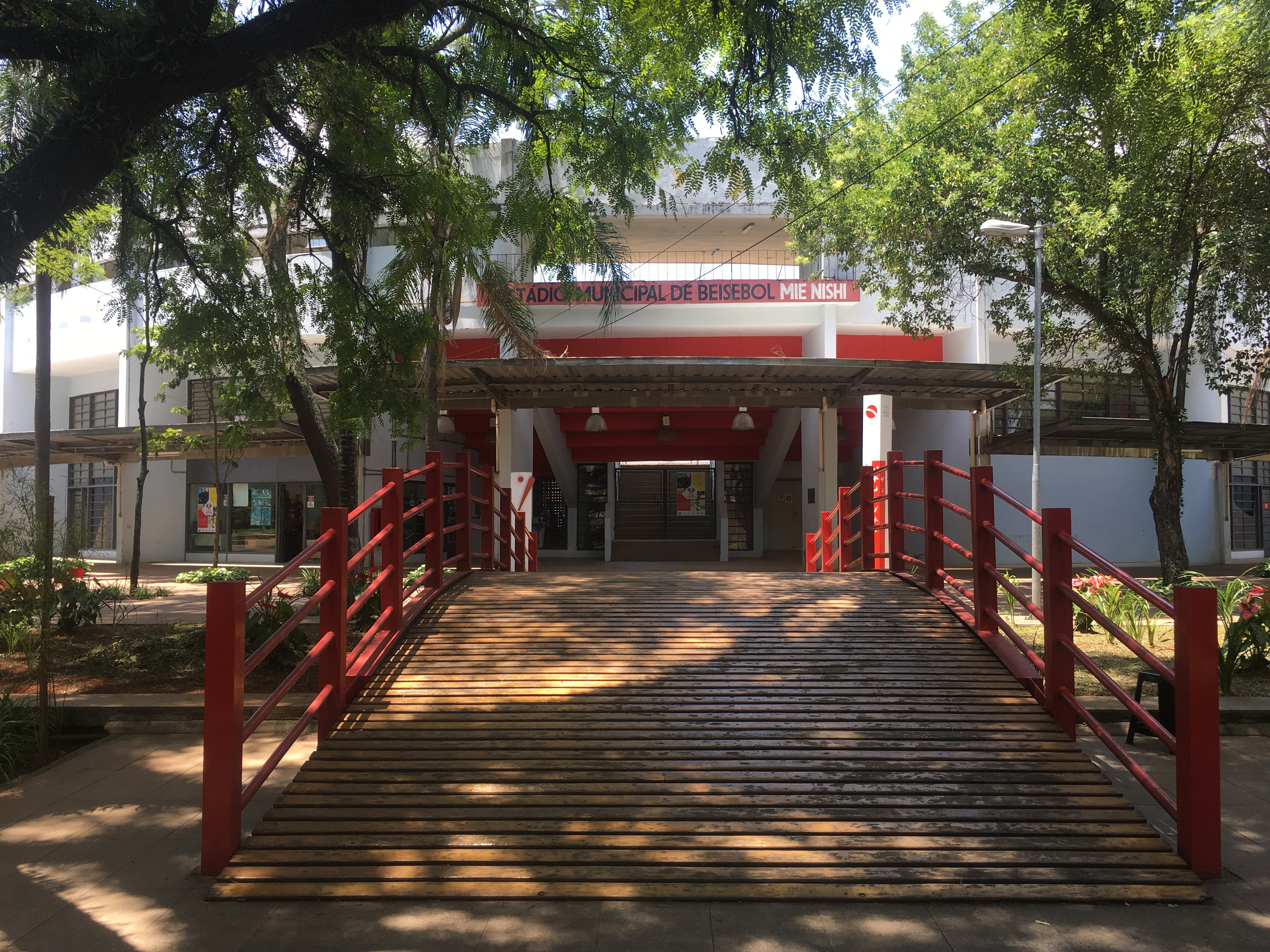
The stadium's main entrance

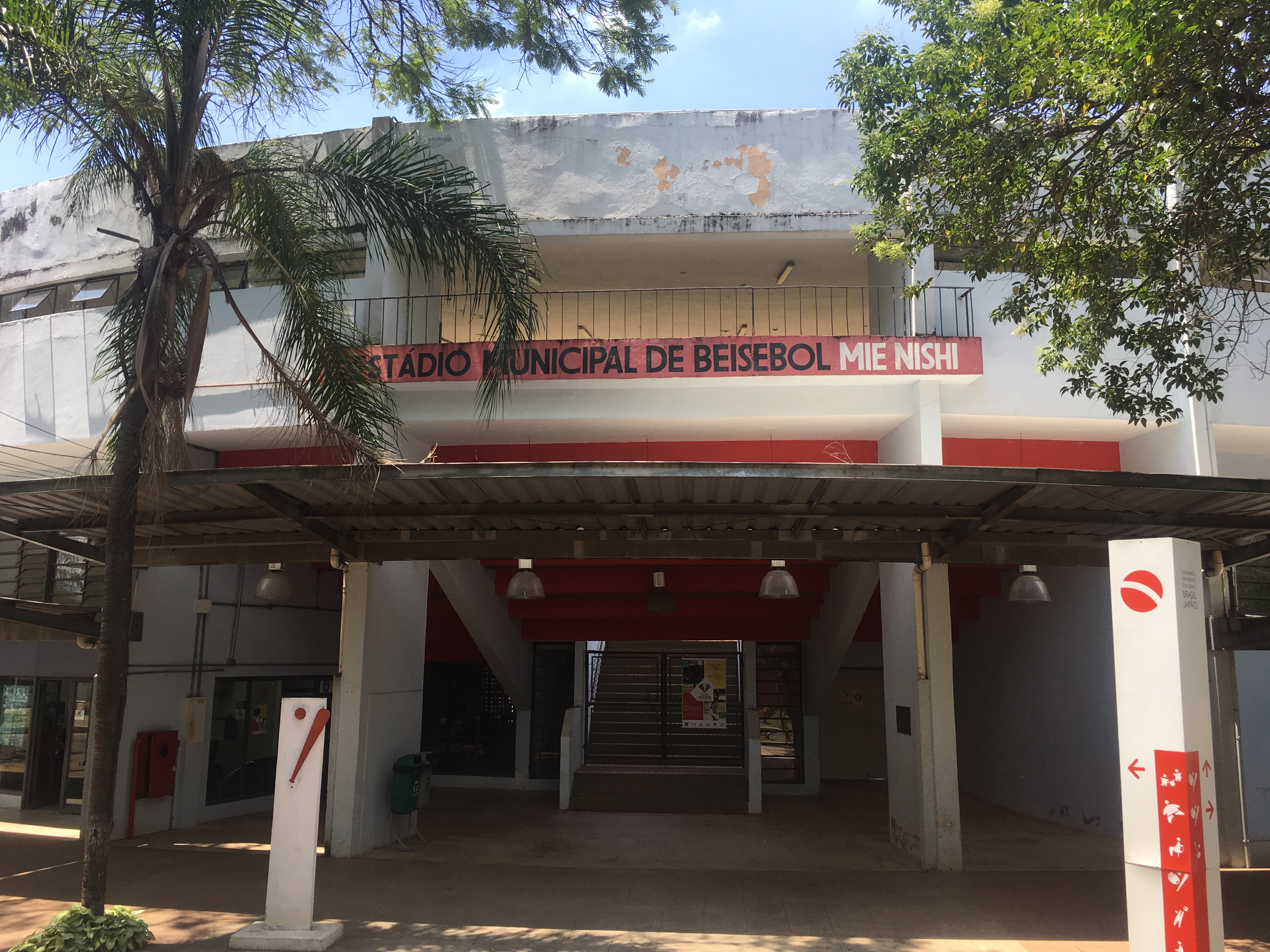
A closer look

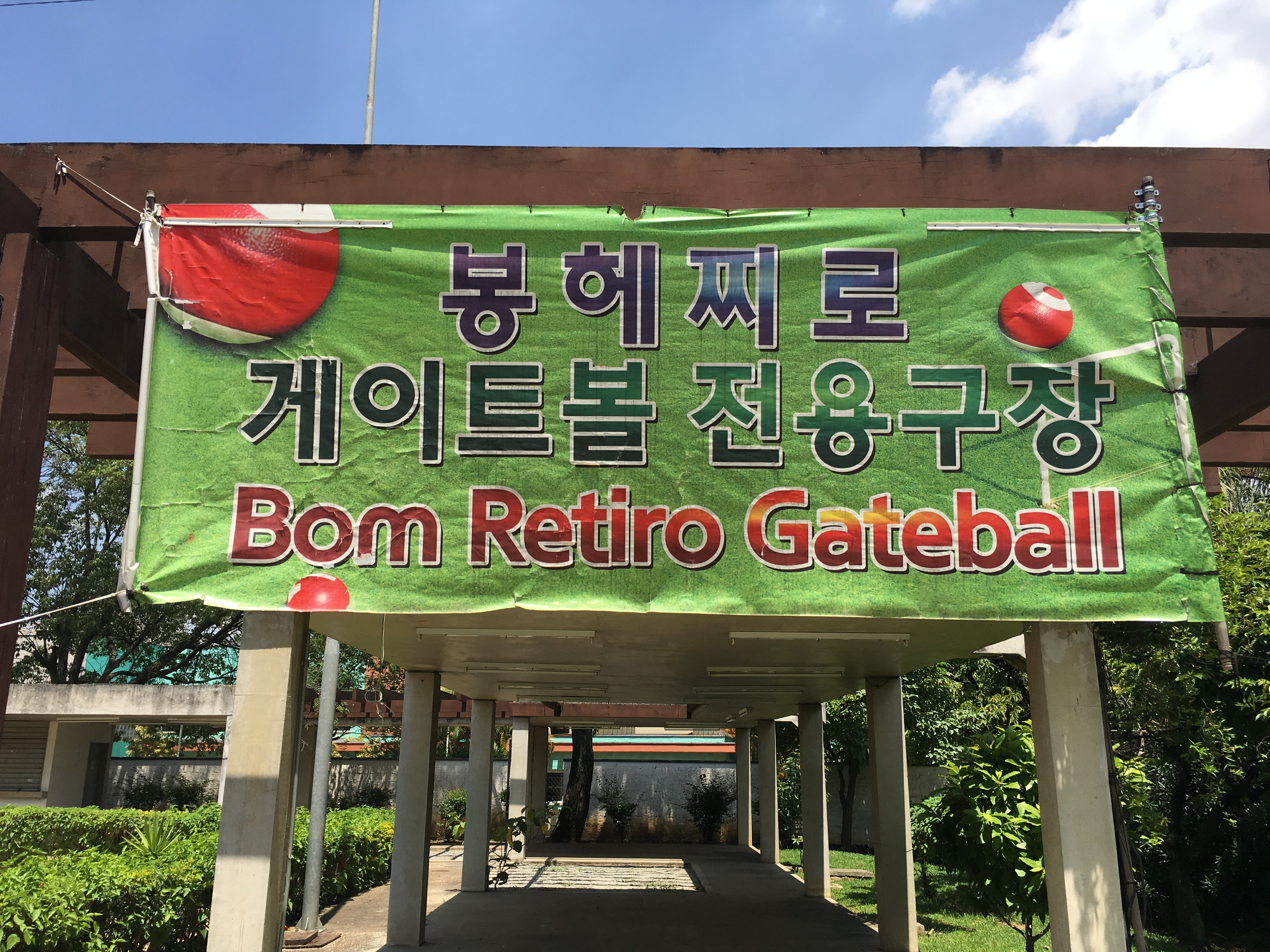
entrance of the Gateball area (in Korean and Portuguese).

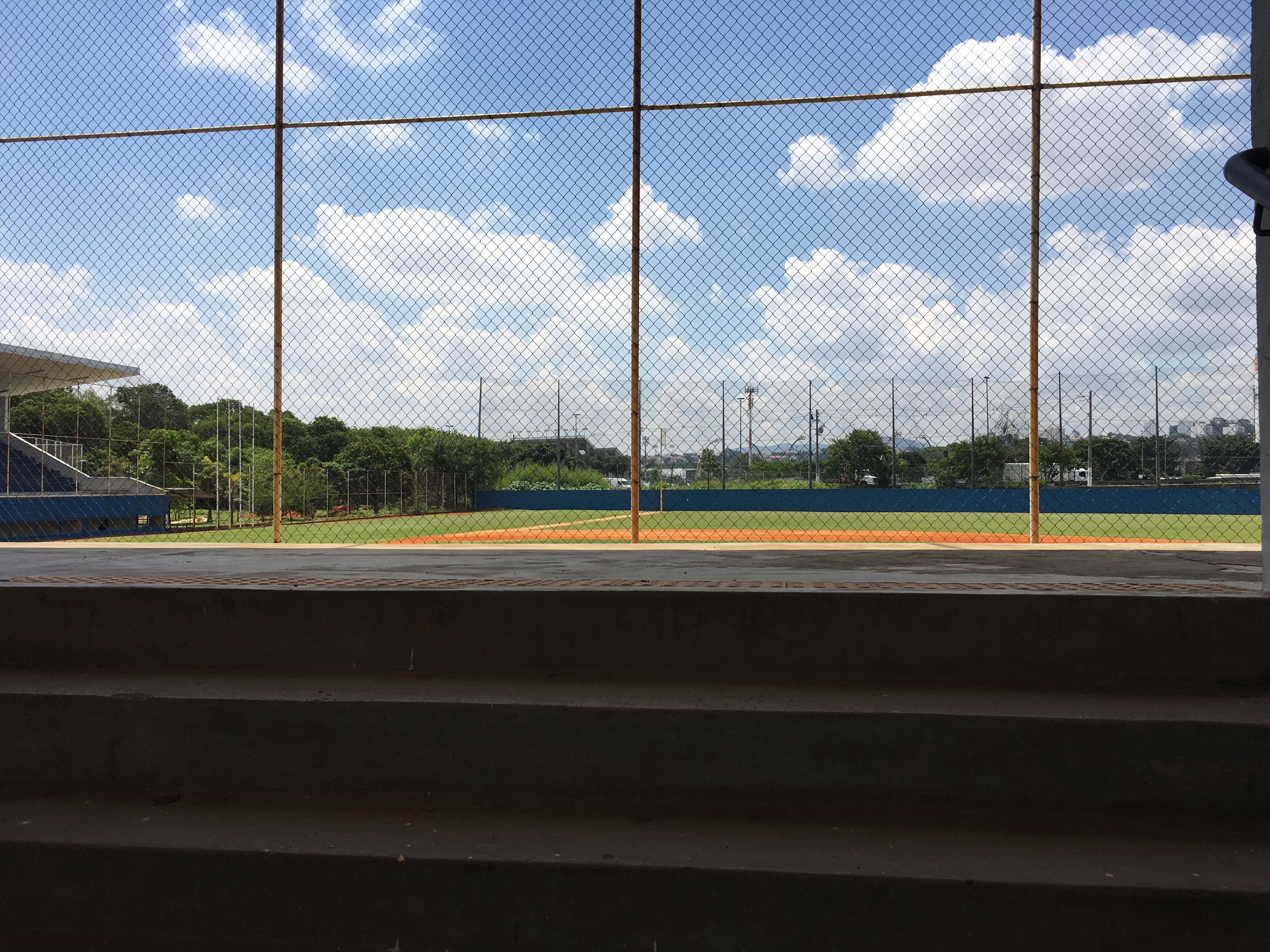
view from inside of the playing field

== See also ==
- Confederação Brasileira de Beisebol e Softbol
