= Japan women's national under-18 softball team =

Japan women's junior national softball team is the junior under-19 national team for Japan.

== Competitions ==
=== U-18 Women's World Cup ===
Year	Result	Position	Pld	W	L	%	RS	RA
(Canada) 1981	Champions	1st						
(United States) 1985	Runners-up	2nd						
(United States) 1987	Third place	3rd						
(Australia) 1991	Champions	1st						
(United States) 1995	Runners-up	2nd						
(Taiwan) 1999	Champions	1st						
(China) 2003	Champions	1st						
(Netherlands) 2007	Runners-up	2nd						
(South Africa) 2011	Runners-up	2nd						
(Canada) 2013	Champions	1st						
(United States) 2015	Runners-up	2nd						
(United States) 2017	Runners-up	2nd	10	8	2	.800		
(United States) 2019 (Note: The group in U-19 Women's Softball World Cup.)	Runners-up	2nd	10	8	2	.800	70	6
(Peru) 2021 (Note: Originally scheduled to be held in 2020, but due to the COVID-19 pandemic, postponed to December 2021.)	Did not compete							
(United States) 2025	Runners-up	2nd	12	10	2	.833	36	19
Total	5 titles	14/15	—					
