= Academy at the Lakes =

Coordinates: 28.191356°N 82.436325°W

Location
- 2331 Collier Parkway; Land 'O Lakes; Land 'O Lakes, (Pasco County), Florida 34639; United States

Information
- Type: Private, coeducational
- Motto: Esse Quam Videri (To Be, Rather Than To Seem)
- Denomination: Nondenominational
- Established: 1992
- Head of school: Mark Heller
- Grades: K–12
- Enrollment: 456 (2014)
- Hours in school day: 7
- Houses: Osprey, Peregrine, Kestrel, and Nighthawk
- Colors: Blue and White
- Fight song: "The Colors of Academy"
- Nickname: Wildcats
- Accreditation: Southern Association of Colleges and Schools
- Website: www.academyatthelakes.org

Academy at the Lakes is a private-independent college preparatory co-educational PreK3–12 school in Land o' Lakes, Florida (metropolitan Tampa).

The school is non-denominational school and has two campuses separated by Collier Parkway. The Wendlek Campus is located on the east side of the street and the McCormick campus is located on the lakefront of Lake Myrtle on the west side.

The Academy currently educates more than 400 students each year and provides its students with abundant opportunities in athletics, the arts, character formation, and community participation. Students and families are divided and assigned within a "house system". This system provides students and families with many cross-age and cross-campus experiences and furthers the Academy's focus upon building community-based relationships.

Beginning in the Lower School, students have opportunities to participate in public speaking and the arts as a part of their core curriculum, taking such courses in subjects such as strings, band, music theory, choruses, theater, and a full range of visual arts, including photography, videography, and sound mixing courses. Performance is a routine part of the student experience.

The school is fully accredited by the Florida Council of Independent Schools and the Florida Kindergarten Council, and is a full member of the National Association of Independent Schools. Locally, Academy at the Lakes is a member of the Bay Area Association of Independent Schools.

== History ==
In 1992, Academy at the Lakes was established as a school focused on college preparation. The first class of seniors at Academy at the Lakes graduated in 2002. In February 2008, the Academy opened a $3.1 million gymnasium, which includes locker rooms, coaches offices, a weight room, and a stage. In 2024, Academy at the Lakes began construction on a new 18,000-square-foot academic building on its McCormick Campus. The two-story facility, completed in early 2025, includes classrooms with modern technology, collaborative learning spaces, faculty work areas, and specialized facilities such as a makerspace, computer lab, audio-visual production studio, and a black box theater. The project was part of the school’s “FORWARD!” capital campaign and broader campus expansion plan.

== Sports ==
The football team won back-to-back Florida state eight-man championships in 2017 and 2018.

== Notable alumni ==
- Lexi Kilfoyl (2020), professional softball pitcher
