= Russia women's national under-18 softball team =

Russia women's junior national softball team is the junior national team for Russia. The team competed at the 1995 ISF Junior Women's World Championship in Normal, Illinois where they finished twelfth. The team competed at the 1999 ISF Junior Women's World Championship in Taipei, Taiwan where they finished eighth. The team competed at the 2003 ISF Junior Women's World Championship in Nanjing, China where they finished seventh. The team competed at the 2007 ISF Junior Women's World Championship in Enschede, Netherlands where they finished thirteenth. The team competed at the 2011 ISF Junior Women's World Championship in Cape Town, South Africa where they finished twelfth.
