= Softball New Zealand =

Sports governing body in New Zealand

- Sport: Softball
- Jurisdiction: New Zealand
- Founded: 1938
- Affiliation: World Baseball Softball Confederation
- Regional affiliation: WBSC Oceania
- President: Lynda O'Cain

Official website
- www.softball.org.nz
- (New Zealand)

Softball New Zealand, formerly known as the New Zealand Softball Association, is the governing body for the sport of softball in New Zealand. Softball New Zealand consists of a number of regional associations and local clubs.

== History ==
On 11 January 1938, it was founded as New Zealand Softball Association. New Zealand's first national men’s inter-provincial tournament took place on 25 March 1939 at the Winter Show Grounds in Wellington.

New Zealand first competed on the international stage when Australia women's teams toured New Zealand in 1949. The International Softball Federation (ISF) (now World Baseball Softball Confederation) hosted the first women's world championships in Melbourne, Australia in 1965. New Zealand finished fourth in a field of 5. The women's team won their first world title in 1982.

The first men's world championships took place in 1966 in Mexico City, Mexico where New Zealand finished third. The men have gone on to become the most successful team winning the world championships 7 times.

New Zealand softball have had 27 players, 7 coaches, 3 umpires 5 administrators, inducted into the WBSC Softball Hall of Fame along with 5 others for their meritorious service.

== Member associations ==
There are 23 member associations as listed on Softball New Zealand's website:

- Auckland Softball Association
- Bay of Islands Softball
- Central Otago Softball Association
- Canterbury Softball Association
- Counties Softball
- Eastern Southland Softball Association
- Franklin Softball Association
- Hawkes Bay Softball
- Hutt Valley Softball Association
- Manawatu Softball
- Marlborough Softball Association
- Mid Canterbury Softball
- Nelson Softball Association
- North Harbour Softball
- Army
- Otago Softball Association
- South Canterbury Softball Association
- Southland Softball Association
- Tairawhiti Softball Association
- Waikato Softball Association
- Whanganui Softball Association
- Wellington Softball Association
- Western Bay of Plenty Softball Association

== Competitions ==
- National Fastpitch Championships (men & women)
- Open Club Championships (men & women)
- U-23 National Tournament (youth men & women)

=== Defunct competitions ===
- NZCT National League (men & women) (2002–2008)

=== Current title holders ===
Competition	Year	Champions	Runners-up	Next edition
Senior (Men's)
New Zealand Men's National Fastpitch Championship	2024	Auckland	Canterbury	2025
Senior (Women's)
New Zealand Women's National Fastpitch Championship	2024	Auckland	North Harbour	2025

== See also ==
Men's

- New Zealand men's national softball team
- New Zealand men's national under-23 softball team
- New Zealand men's junior national softball team

Women's

- New Zealand women's national softball team
- New Zealand women's national under-18 softball team
