= 2020 U-18 Women's Softball World Cup =

Tournament details
- Host country: Peru
- Dates: December 6 – 12, 2021
- Teams: 8 (from 5 continents)

Final positions
- Champions: United States (8th title)
- Runner-up: Chinese Taipei
- Third place: Puerto Rico
- Fourth place: Mexico

The 2020 U-18 Women's Softball World Cup was an international softball competition held in Lima, Peru from December 6 to 12, 2021. It was the 14th edition of the tournament.

The edition was set to take place from 23 to 30 August 2020 in Lima, Peru, but was postponed in April to December 2021 due to the COVID-19 pandemic.

The United States won its eighth title, after defeating Chinese Taipei 1–0 in final.

== Results ==
=== Round Robin ===
Pos	Team	Pld	W	L	RF	RA	RD	PCT	GB	Qualification
1	United States	7	7	0	56	5	+51	1.000	—	Advance to Final
2	Chinese Taipei	7	6	1	40	15	+25	.857	1	Advance to Final
3	Puerto Rico	7	5	2	28	14	+14	.714	2	Advance to Third place play-off
4	Mexico	7	4	3	23	11	+12	.571	3	Advance to Third place play-off
5	Czech Republic	7	3	4	24	24	0	.429	4	
6	Peru (H)	7	1	6	5	43	−38	.143	6	
7	Netherlands	7	1	6	17	41	−24	.143	6	
8	Colombia	7	1	6	9	47	−38	.143	6	

First match(es) will be played: 6 December 2021. Source: WBSC
Rules for classification: 1) Wins/losses; 2) Head to head; 3) Head to head runs against; 4) Runs against; 5) Head to head
(H) Hosts

Date	Local time	Road team	Score	Home team	Inn.	Venue	Game duration	Attendance	Boxscore
Dec 6, 2021	23:00	Chinese Taipei	9–0	Colombia					Boxscore
Dec 7, 2021	01:30	Puerto Rico	2–0	Mexico					Boxscore
Dec 7, 2021	04:00	Czech Republic	0–10	United States					Boxscore
Dec 7, 2021	08:00	Netherlands	1–3	Peru					Boxscore
Dec 8, 2021	00:00	Puerto Rico	0–4	Chinese Taipei					Boxscore
Dec 8, 2021	01:00	Colombia	0–8	United States					Boxscore
Dec 8, 2021	02:30	Netherlands	5–11	Chinese Taipei					Boxscore
Dec 8, 2021	05:30	Mexico	3–5	United States					Boxscore
Dec 8, 2021	08:00	Czech Republic	8–0	Peru					Boxscore
Dec 9, 2021	00:00	Chinese Taipei	5–1	Mexico					Boxscore
Dec 9, 2021	01:00	Czech Republic	2–1	Netherlands					Boxscore
Dec 9, 2021	02:30	United States	1–0	Puerto Rico					Boxscore
Dec 9, 2021	05:30	Peru	2–5	Puerto Rico					Boxscore
Dec 9, 2021	08:00	Peru	0–2	Colombia					Boxscore
Dec 10, 2021	00:00	Mexico	3–1	Chile					Boxscore
Dec 10, 2021	01:00	Colombia	0–7	Puerto Rico					Boxscore
Dec 10, 2021	02:30	Netherlands	0–10	United States					Boxscore
Dec 10, 2021	05:30	Colombia	5–10	Czech Republic					Boxscore
Dec 10, 2021	08:00	Chinese Taipei	8–0	Peru					Boxscore
Dec 11, 2021	00:00	Colombia	0–7	Mexico					Boxscore
Dec 11, 2021	01:00	Puerto Rico	10–4	Netherlands					Boxscore
Dec 11, 2021	02:30	Czech Republic	0–1	Chinese Taipei					Boxscore
Dec 11, 2021	05:30	Mexico	3–0	Netherlands					Boxscore
Dec 11, 2021	08:00	United States	13–0	Peru					Boxscore
Dec 12, 2021	00:00	Czech Republic	3–4	Puerto Rico					Boxscore
Dec 12, 2021	02:30	Chinese Taipei	2–9	United States					Boxscore
Dec 12, 2021	05:30	Netherlands	6–2	Colombia					Boxscore
Dec 12, 2021	08:00	Peru	0–6	Mexico					Boxscore

=== Third place play-off ===
13 December 2021 02:00
Team	1	2	3	4	5	6	7	R	H	E
Mexico	0	0	0	0	0	0	0	0	2	1
Puerto Rico	0	0	0	2	2	0	X	4	5	0
Boxscore

=== Final ===
13 December 2021 05:00
Team	1	2	3	4	5	6	7	R	H	E
Chinese Taipei	0	0	0	0	0	0	0	0	4	0
United States	0	0	0	0	0	0	1	1	6	0
Boxscore

== Final standings ==
Rank	Team
1st place, gold medalist(s)	United States
2nd place, silver medalist(s)	Chinese Taipei
3rd place, bronze medalist(s)	Puerto Rico
4	Mexico
5	Czech Republic
6	Peru
7	Netherlands
8	Colombia
