= United States women's national under-18 softball team =

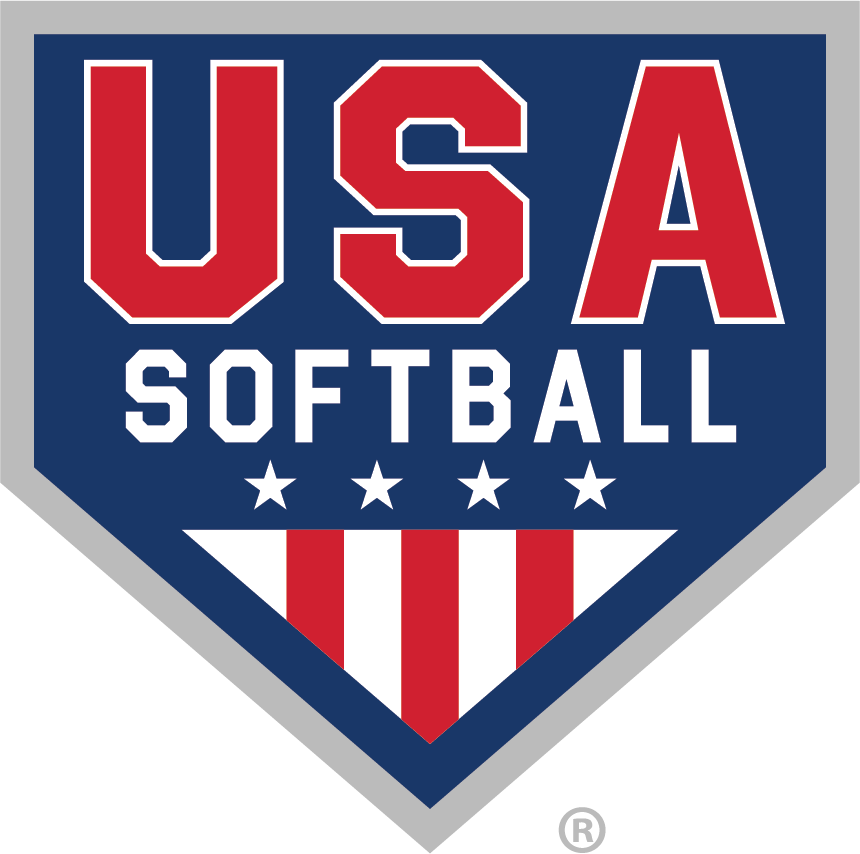

Information
- Country: United States
- Federation: USA Softball
- Confederation: WBSC Americas

United States women's national under-18 softball team
Medal record

U-18 Women's World Cup
Gold medal – first place	1987 Oklahoma City	
Gold medal – first place	1995 Normal	
Gold medal – first place	2007 Enschede	
Gold medal – first place	2011 Cape Town	
Gold medal – first place	2015 Oklahoma City	
Gold medal – first place	2017 Clearwater	
Gold medal – first place	2019 Irvine	
Gold medal – first place	2021 Lima	
Gold medal – first place	2025 Oklahoma City	
Silver medal – second place	1981 Edmonton	
Silver medal – second place	1991 Adelaide	
Silver medal – second place	1999 Taipei	
Silver medal – second place	2003 Nanjing	
Silver medal – second place	2013 Brampton	
Bronze medal – third place	1985 Fargo	

United States women's junior national softball team is the junior national under-18 team for United States.

== History ==
The United States made their ISF Junior Women's World Championship debut in 1981, and finished in second place. The team competed at the 1985 ISF Junior Women's World Championship in Fargo, North Dakota and finished in third place. The team competed at the 1987 Junior Women's Softball World Championship in Oklahoma City, Oklahoma and won their first gold medal. The team competed at the 1991 ISF Junior Women's World Championship in Adelaide, Australia where they had 11 wins and two losses, and finished in second place. The team competed at the 1995 Junior Women's Softball World Championship in Normal, Illinois and won their second gold medal. The team competed at the 1999 ISF Junior Women's World Championship]] in Taipei, Taiwan and finished in second place.

The team competed at the 2003 ISF Junior Women's World Championship in Nanjing, China and finished in second place. The team competed at the 2007 ISF Junior Women's World Championship in Enschede, the Netherlands and won their third gold medal. The team competed at the 2011 ISF Junior Women's World Championship in Cape Town, South Africa and won their fourth gold medal. The team competed at the 2013 ISF Junior Women's World Championship in Brampton, Ontario and finished in second place.

The United States won their record fifth consecutive, and the program's ninth overall, U-18 Women's Softball World Cup in 2025. They also set a record 48-game winning streak at the World Championship.

== Competitive record ==
=== U-18 Women's World Cup ===
Year	Result	Position	Pld	W	L	%	RS	RA
(Canada) 1981	Runners-up	2nd						
(United States) 1985	Third place	3rd						
(United States) 1987	Champions	1st						
(Australia) 1991	Runners-up	2nd						
(United States) 1995	Champions	1st						
(Taiwan) 1999	Runners-up	2nd						
(China) 2003	Runners-up	2nd						
(Netherlands) 2007	Champions	1st						
(South Africa) 2011	Champions	1st						
(Canada) 2013	Runners-up	2nd						
(United States) 2015	Champions	1st						
(United States) 2017	Champions	1st	9	9	0	1.000	99	9
(United States) 2019 (Note: The group in U-19 Women's Softball World Cup.)	Champions	1st	10	10	0	1.000	83	3
(Peru) 2021 (Note: Originally scheduled to be held in 2020, but due to the COVID-19 pandemic, postponed to December 2021.)	Champions	1st	8	8	0	1.000	57	5
(United States) 2025	Champions	1st	6	6	0	1.000	48	9
Total	9 titles	15/15	—					
