= Chinese Softball Association =

Governing body of softball in China

The Chinese Softball Association (中国垒球协会) is a national mass sports organization, headquartered in Beijing. Established in 1979 as the Chinese Baseball and Softball Association, it adopted its current name in 1986. The association is a member of the All-China Sports Federation.
