= Venezuela women's national under-18 softball team =

Venezuela women's junior national softball team is the junior national team for Venezuela. The team competed at the 1999 ISF Junior Women's World Championship in Taipei, Taiwan where they finished fifth. The team competed at the 2007 ISF Junior Women's World Championship in Enschede, Netherlands where they finished fourth.
