= Confederação Brasileira de Beisebol e Softbol =

- Sport: Baseball and softball
- Jurisdiction: Brazil
- Abbreviation: CBBS
- Founded: 1990
- Affiliation: WBSC
- Regional affiliation: WBSC Americas
- Headquarters: São Paulo, Brazil
- President: Thiago Caldeira

Official website
- www.cbbs.com.br
- (Brazil)

The Confederação Brasileira de Beisebol e Softbol is the confederation responsible for baseball and softball in Brazil. Founded in 1990, the CBBS is headquartered in São Paulo and has a mission to both organize the bat-and-ball games and popularize the sports for the general public of the country, as baseball was mostly historically tradtionallly restricted to the Japanese Brazilians. CBBS supports the Brazil national baseball team, and has 120 affiliated teams and 30,000 players across the country.
