= Netherlands women's national under-18 softball team =

Netherlands women's junior national softball team is the junior national under-18 team for Netherlands. The team competed at:

- the 1985 ISF Junior Women's World Championship in Fargo, North Dakota where they finished sixth.
- the 1987 ISF Junior Women's World Championship in Oklahoma City, Oklahoma where they finished sixth.
- the 1991 ISF Junior Women's World Championship in Adelaide, Australia where they had 5 wins and 6 losses.
- the 1995 ISF Junior Women's World Championship in Normal, Illinois where they finished seventh.
- the 1999 ISF Junior Women's World Championship in Taipei, Taiwan where they finished twelfth.
- the 2003 ISF Junior Women's World Championship in Nanjing, China where they finished tenth.
- the 2007 ISF Junior Women's World Championship in Enschede, Netherlands where they finished sixth.
- the 2013 ISF Junior Women's World Championship in Brampton, Ontario where they finished tenth.
- the 2017 Junior Women's Softball World Championship in Clearwater, Florida, where they finished 14th and lost in the classification round.
- the 2019 WBSC U-19 Women's Softball World Cup in Irvine, California, where they finished 13th.
- the 2020 U-18 Women's Softball World Cup in Lima, Peru, where they finished seventh.
