= Brazil women's national softball team =

Information
- Country: Brazil
- Federation: Confederação Brasileira de Beisebol e Softbol (CBBS)
- Confederation: WBSC Americas
- WBSC World Rank: 17 (31 December 2025)

Brazil women's national softball team is the national team for Brazil. It is governed by the Confederação Brasileira de Beisebol e Softbol and takes part in international team softball competitions. The team qualified to compete at the 2015 Pan American Games in Toronto, Canada, where they were defeated by Canada 6–0 in the opening game for women's softball. In the 2016 Women's Softball World Championship, the team placed 12th. The team will participate in the 2027 Women’s Softball World Cup Group Stage in September 2026, replacing South Africa.
