= Mexico women's national under-18 softball team =

The Mexico women's junior national softball team is the junior national under-17 team for Mexico. The team competed at the 1985 ISF Junior Women's World Championship in Fargo, North Dakota where they finished eighth. The team competed at the 1987 ISF Junior Women's World Championship in Oklahoma City, Oklahoma where they finished tenth. The team competed at the 2013 ISF Junior Women's World Championship in Brampton, Ontario where they finished twelfth.
