= New Zealand women's national under-18 softball team =

New Zealand women's under-18 softball team

Information
- Country: New Zealand
- Federation: Softball New Zealand
- Confederation: WBSC Oceania
- Manager: Kiri Shaw

New Zealand women's junior national softball team is the junior national under-18 team for New Zealand. The team competed at the 1987 ISF Junior Women's World Championship in Oklahoma City, where they finished eighth. The team competed at the 1991 ISF Junior Women's World Championship in Adelaide, Australia, where they had seven wins and four losses. The team competed at the 1995 ISF Junior Women's World Championship in Normal, Illinois where they finished eighth. The team competed at the 1999 ISF Junior Women's World Championship in Taipei, Taiwan where they finished ninth. The team competed at the 2003 ISF Junior Women's World Championship in Nanjing, China where they finished eighth. The team competed at the 2007 ISF Junior Women's World Championship in Enschede, Netherlands where they finished eleventh. The team competed at the 2011 ISF Junior Women's World Championship in Cape Town, South Africa where they finished sixth. The team competed at the 2013 ISF Junior Women's World Championship in Brampton, Ontario where they finished fourth.
