= Australia women's national under-18 softball team =

Australia women's junior national softball team is the junior national under-17 team for Australia.

The team competed at the 1985 ISF Junior Women's World Championship in Fargo, North Dakota where they finished fifth.

The team competed at the 1987 ISF Junior Women's World Championship in Oklahoma City, Oklahoma where they finished fourth.

The team competed at the 1991 ISF Junior Women's World Championship in Adelaide, Australia where they had 9 wins and 3 losses.

The team competed at the 1995 ISF Junior Women's World Championship in Normal, Illinois where they finished third.

The team competed at the 1999 ISF Junior Women's World Championship in Taipei, Taiwan where they finished sixth.

The team competed at the 2003 ISF Junior Women's World Championship in Nanjing, China where they finished third.

The team competed at the 2007 ISF Junior Women's World Championship in Enschede, Netherlands where they finished third.

The team competed at the 2011 ISF Junior Women's World Championship in Cape Town, South Africa where they finished fourth.

The team competed at the 2013 ISF Junior Women's World Championship in Brampton, Ontario where they finished third.
