= Asia-Pacific International Baseball Training Centers =

Baseball training complex in Annan, Tainan, Taiwan

Tainan Asia-Pacific International Baseball Training Centers
- 台南亞太國際棒球訓練中心
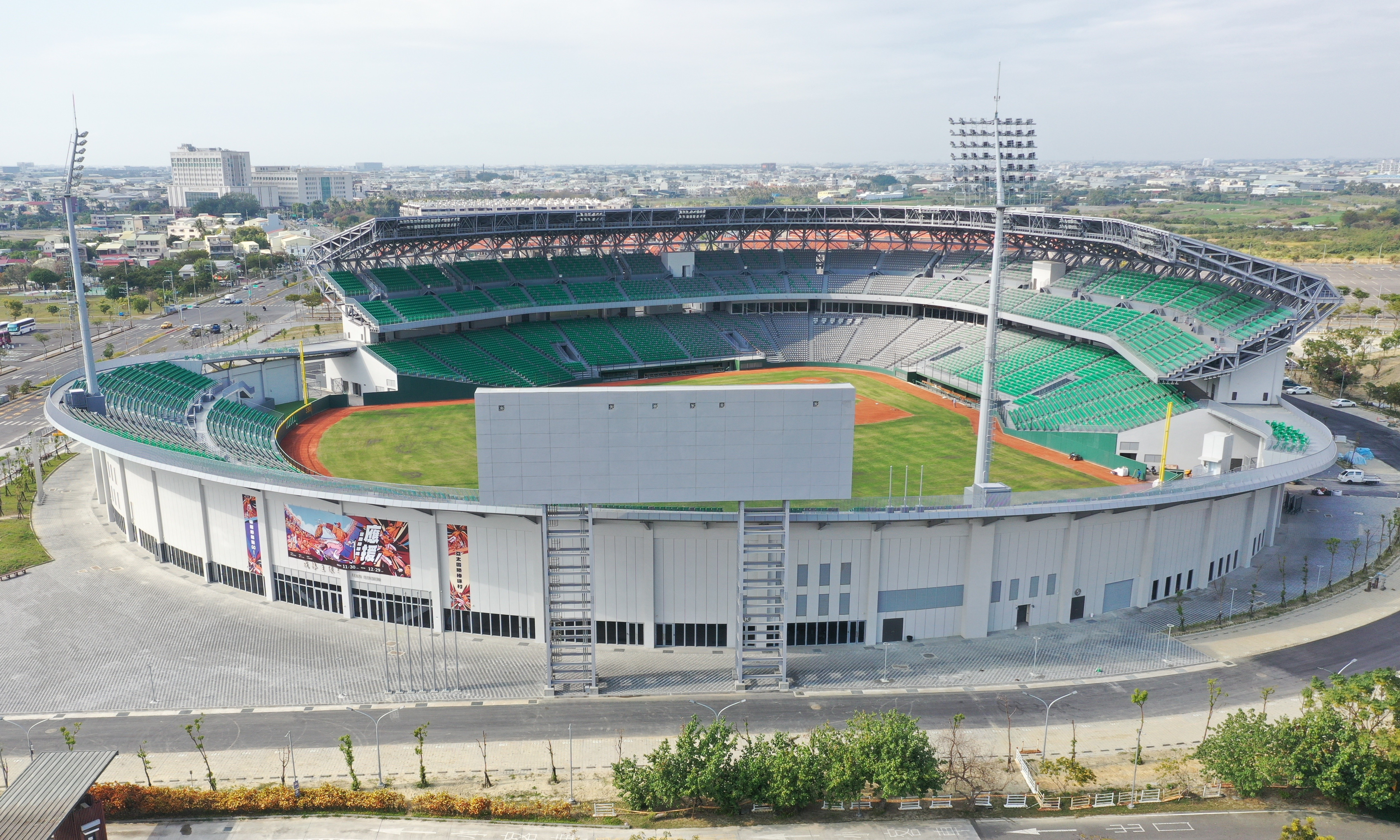
- Main stadium in 2025
- Interactive map of Tainan Asia-Pacific International Baseball Training Centers
- Location: Annan, Tainan, Taiwan
- Coordinates: 23.06271°N 120.23668°E
- Owner: Tainan City Government
- Type: Sports Complex

Construction
- Built: 2018-2025
- Cost: NT$2.2 billion (US$68 million)

The Asia-Pacific International Baseball Training Centers (Chinese: 亞太國際棒球訓練中心; pinyin: Yàtài Guójì Bàngqiú Xùnliàn Zhōngxīn) is a baseball training complex in Annan District, Tainan, Taiwan. The complex consists of two standard stadiums, two youth stadiums, two infield training fields, six outdoor pitching/batting training lanes and an indoor training facility. The largest stadium at the Asia-Pacific International Baseball Training Centres is the 25,000-capacity Main Stadium (often called Asia-Pacific Stadium 亞太球場 or ASPAC Stadium for short), the home of the Uni-President 7-Eleven Lions.

== History ==
The city of Tainan announced in 2016 the plans for the training complex aimed to turn Tainan into a spring training base for professional baseball teams from Taiwan and abroad. Construction of the complex is split into two phases, with Phase 1 focusing on the youth league stadiums, and Phase 2 on the standard stadiums and other training facilities. Phase 1 was completed just in time to host the 2019 U-12 Baseball World Cup, while Phase 2 was completed by end 2024. The Uni-President 7-Eleven Lions, which previously based in the Tainan Municipal Baseball Stadium, is using the primary stadium as its home and is expected to acquire operation rights from the Tainan City Government.

The complex saw its first professional use in 2024, when Uni-President 7-Eleven Lions hosted their spring training in the secondary stadium and the adjoining facilities. The primary stadium saw its first professional baseball regular season game on March 29th, 2026 where Lions hosted the visiting TSG Hawks.

== Ballparks ==
| Ballpark | Capacity | Surface | Open | Dimension |
|---|---|---|---|---|
| Main Stadium | 25,000 | Grass | 2025 | TBD |
| Secondary Stadium | 3,000 | Grass | 2023 | TBD |
| Youth Primary Stadium | 8,000 | Grass | 2019 | TBD |
| Youth Secondary Stadium | 1,000 | Grass | 2019 | TBD |

== Events held ==
- U-12 Baseball World Cup (2019, 2022, 2023, 2025, at Youth Primary and Secondary Stadiums)
- 2025 U15 Asian Baseball Championship (at Primary and Secondary Stadiums)
- 2027 Women's Baseball World Cup (Group Stage, held in 2026 at Secondary Stadium)

== Gallery ==
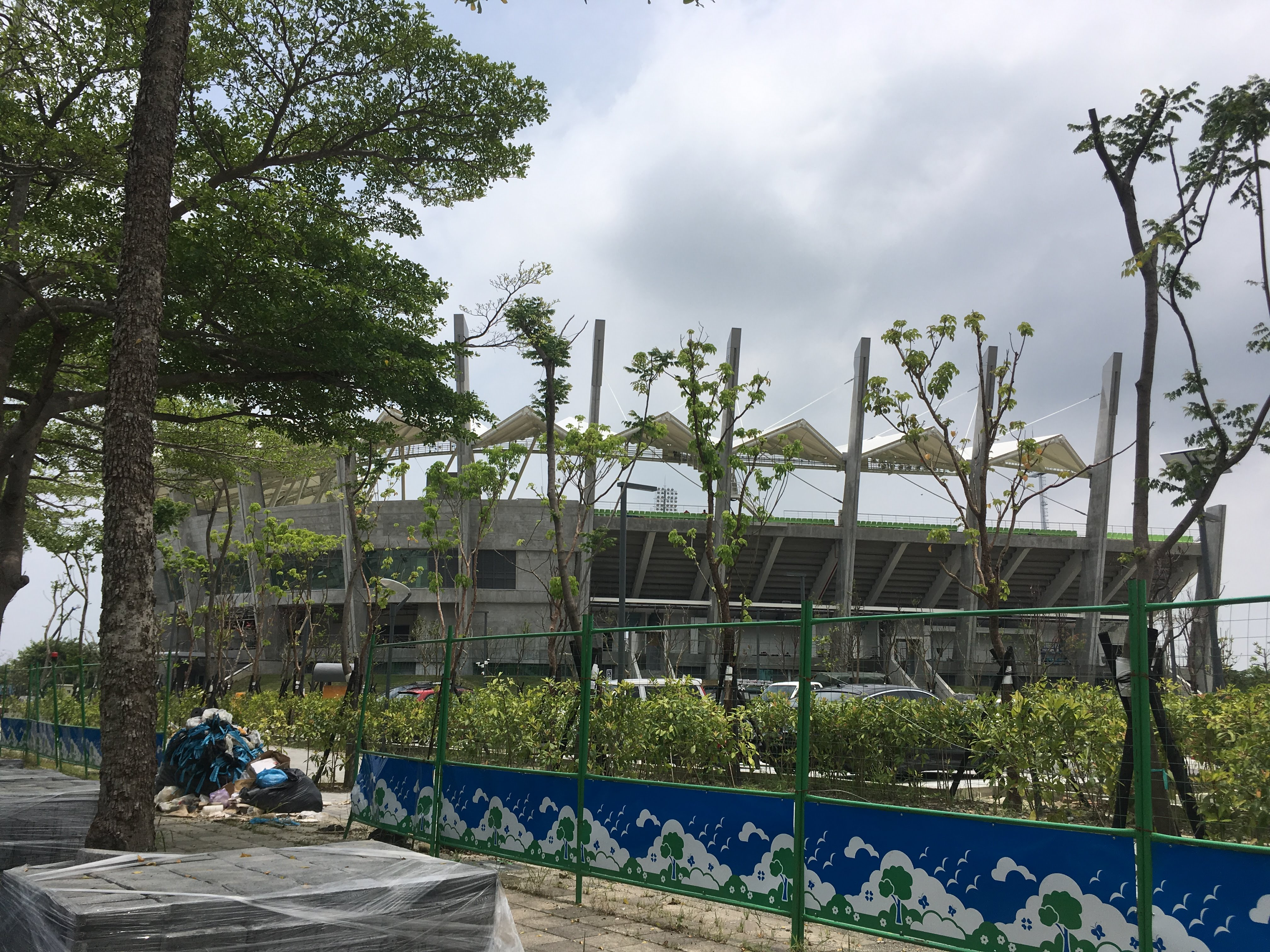
Youth primary stadium during construction.

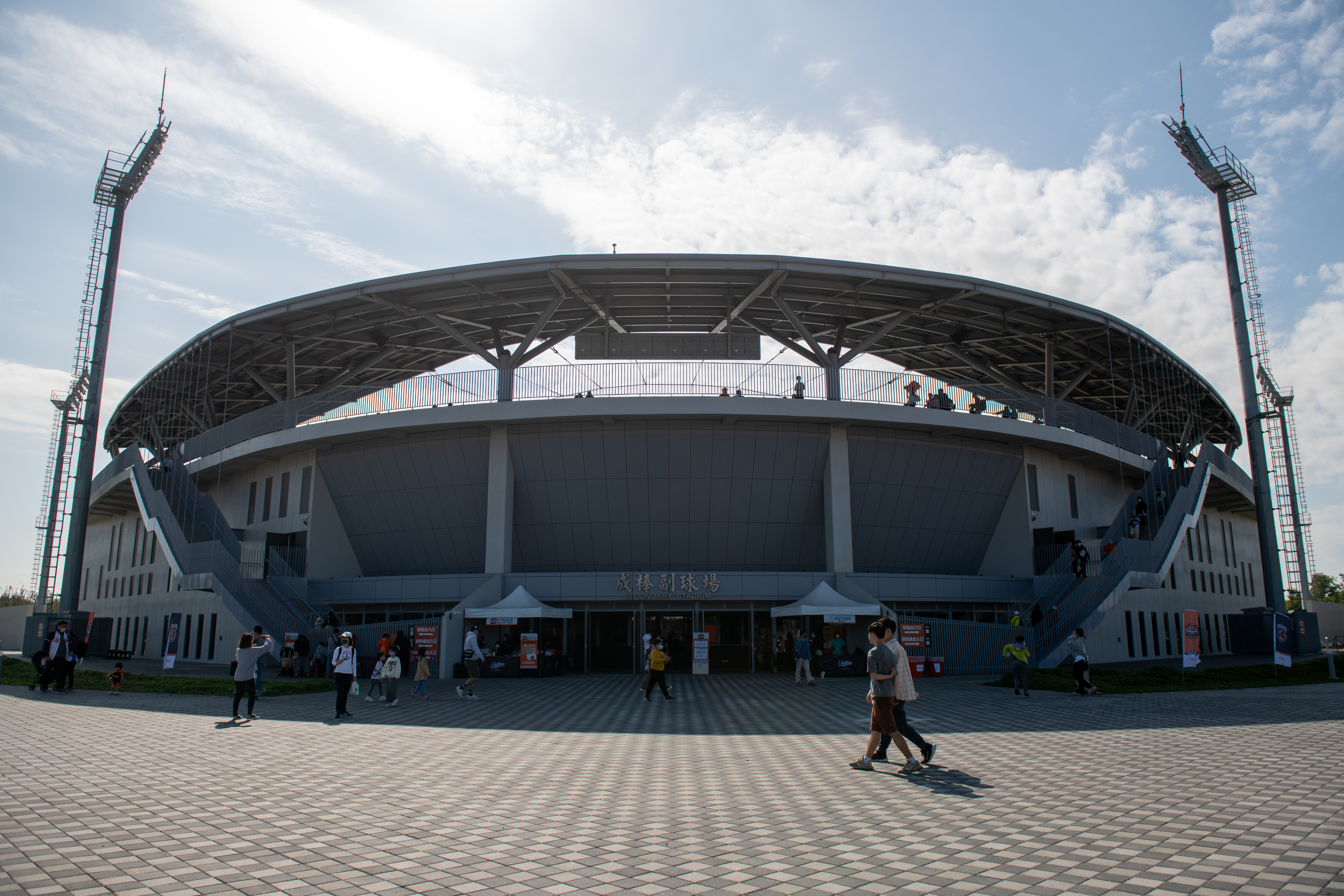
Front entrance of the secondary stadium.

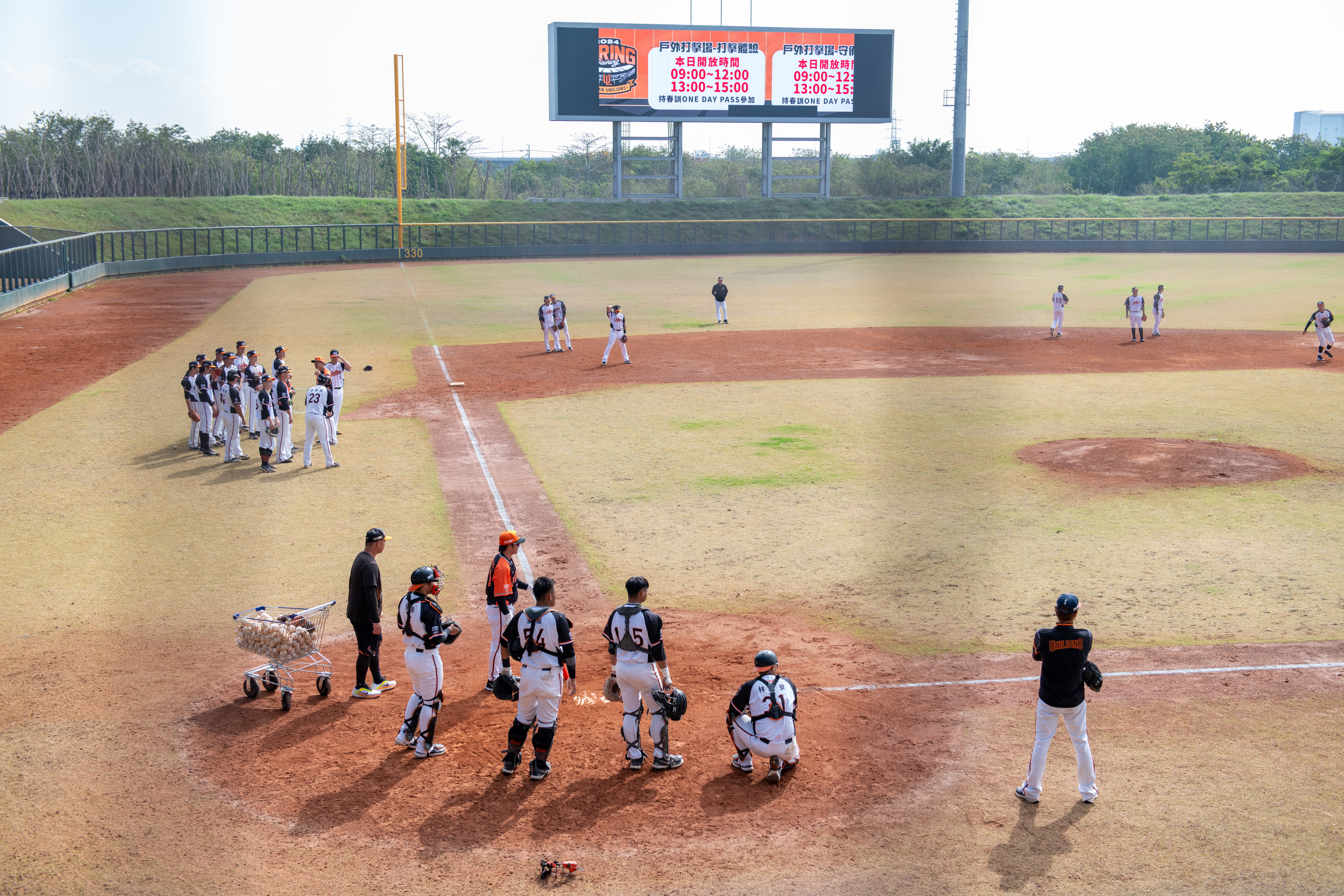
Spectator view of the secondary stadium.

== See also ==
- List of stadiums in Taiwan
- Sport in Taiwan
