= Brady House (baseball) =

American baseball player (born 2003)

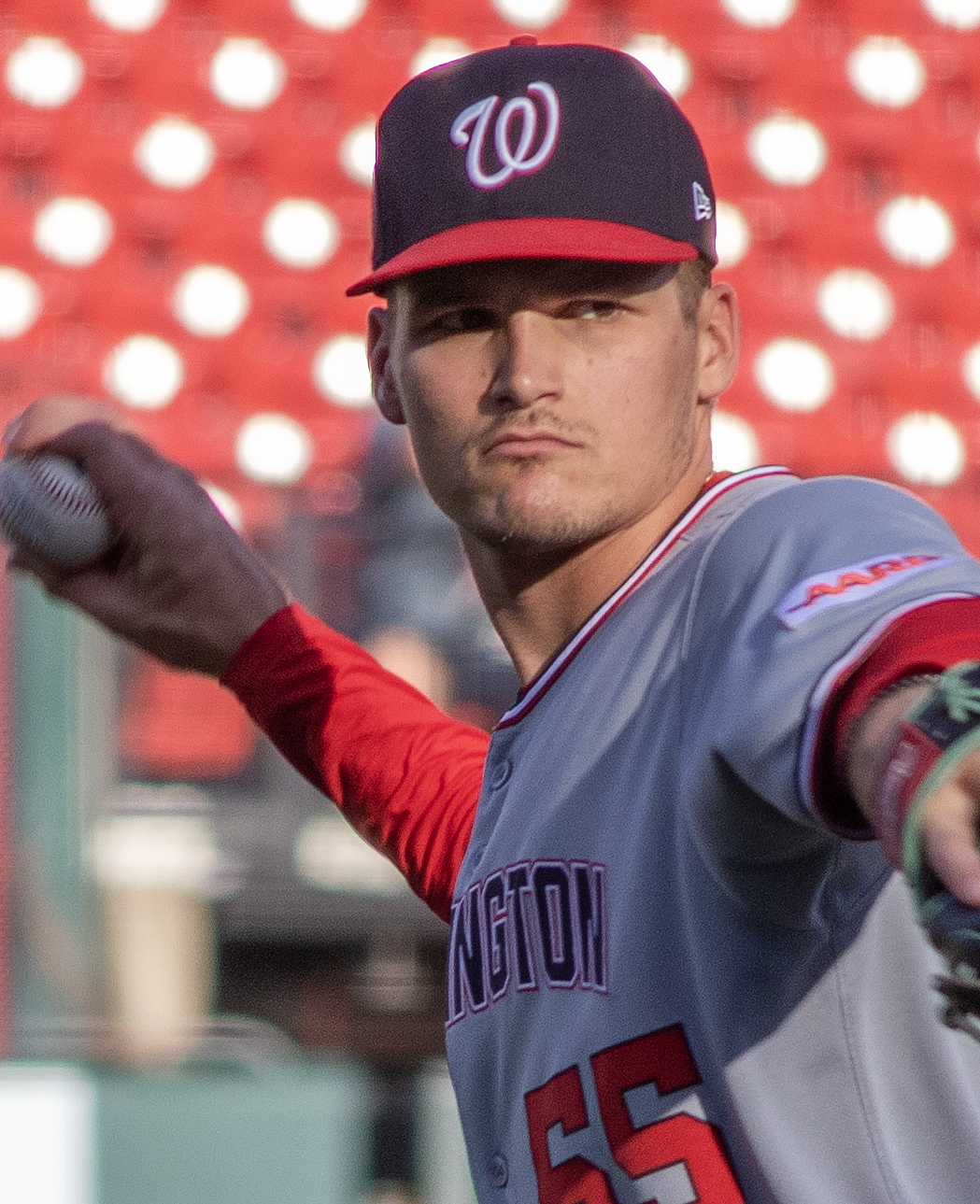
- House with the Washington Nationals

Washington Nationals – No. 12
- Third baseman
- Born: June 4, 2003 (age 23); Winder, Georgia, U.S.
- Bats: Right Throws: Right

MLB debut
- June 16, 2025, for the Washington Nationals

MLB statistics (through 2026 season)
- Batting average: .241
- Home runs: 14
- Runs batted in: 75
- Stats at Baseball Reference

Teams
- Washington Nationals (2025–present)
Medals
Men's baseball
Representing United States
U-12 Baseball World Cup
Gold medal – first place	2015 Tainan	Team
U-15 Baseball World Cup
Gold medal – first place	2018 Panama	Team

Brady Hunter House (born June 4, 2003) is an American professional baseball third baseman for the Washington Nationals of Major League Baseball (MLB). He made his MLB debut in 2025.

== Amateur career ==
House grew up in Winder, Georgia. While attending middle school, he was named to United States' U-12 national team. House attended Winder-Barrow High School. He hit .445 with five home runs and 21 RBIs as a sophomore in 2019. Following the season, he committed to play college baseball at the University of Tennessee. House batted .653 as a junior through 15 games before his season ended early due to the COVID-19 pandemic. House entered 2021 as a top prospect for the upcoming Major League Baseball draft. He had a .549 batting average and 52 runs scored, 20 RBIs, and eight home runs in his senior season. He was ranked the best power hitting draft prospect by MLB.com.

== Professional career ==
House was selected by the Washington Nationals with the 11th overall selection of the 2021 Major League Baseball draft. He signed with the team on July 31, 2021, and received a $5 million signing bonus. House was assigned to the Rookie-level Florida Complex League Nationals to start his professional career. Over 16 games, he batted .322 with four home runs and 12 RBI.

House started the 2022 season with the Low-A Fredericksburg Nationals, but played in only 45 games due to injury. He had 176 plate appearances for Fredericksburg, and slashed .278/.356/.375 with eight doubles, three home runs, and 31 RBI.

House started the 2023 season with the Fredericksburg, playing in 36 games and batting .297 with eight doubles, one triple, and six home runs. On June 9, 2023, he was promoted to the High-A Wilmington Blue Rocks. While with the Blue Rocks, he played in 16 games with an average of .317, five doubles, and three home runs. On July 7, House played in the All-Star Futures game. After the All-Star break, he was promoted to the Double-A Harrisburg Senators, where he finished the season. House played in 36 contests with 139 plate appearances, and hit .324 with eight doubles, two triples, and three home runs.

House started the 2024 season with Harrisburg, and played in 75 games, batting .234/.310/.423 with 13 home runs, 34 RBI, and five stolen bases. On July 7, 2024, he was promoted to the Triple-A Rochester Red Wings. On July 12, House played in the Futures Game for the second consecutive year. In 54 appearances down the stretch, he batted .250/.280/.375 with six home runs and 32 RBI.

House began the 2025 campaign with Triple-A Rochester, playing in 65 games and slashing .304/.353/.519 with 13 home runs and 41 RBI. On June 16, 2025, House was selected to the 40-man roster and promoted to the major leagues for the first time. He made his MLB debut that same day in a game against the Colorado Rockies, starting at third base and going 0-for-3 with one walk. On July 12, House got his first major league home run in a performance that saw him hit two home runs and go 3-for-4 with three RBI in a 6-5 loss against the Milwaukee Brewers. House ended the year playing in 73 games with the Nationals, slashing .234/.252/.322, with four home runs and 29 RBI.

House was optioned back to Rochester during the 2026 season. On July 10, 2026, he hit for the cycle in a Rochester win over the Worcester Red Sox. Promoted to the Nationals, he increased his MLB playing time, appearing in 95 games, slashing .247/.313/.397, with 10 home runs and 46 RBI. He was mainly platooned to play against left-handers, against whom he hit especially well, with a .350 average and a .975 OPS. He also hit with power, hitting one home run 445 feet on August 28 against the Miami Marlins at Nationals Park.
