= Justin Campbell (baseball) =

American baseball player (born 2001)

Cleveland Guardians
- Pitcher
- Born: February 14, 2001 (age 25); West Hills, California, U.S.
- Bats: Left Throws: Right
Medals
Men's baseball
Representing United States
U-15 Baseball World Cup
Bronze medal – third place	2016 Iwaki	Team
U-12 Baseball World Cup
Gold medal – first place	2013 Taipei	Team

Justin Campbell (born February 14, 2001) is an American professional baseball pitcher in the Cleveland Guardians organization.

== Amateur career ==
Campbell attended Simi Valley High School in Simi Valley, California, where he played baseball. As a senior in 2019, he went 8–2 with a 1.17 ERA and 102 strikeouts over 65 innings alongside batting .409 with three home runs. He was selected by the Houston Astros in the 18th round of the 2019 Major League Baseball draft, but did not sign. Campbell originally committed to play college baseball at Tulane University, but due to changes in admission requirements, he was unable to attend, and instead enrolled at Oklahoma State University.

As a freshman at Oklahoma State in 2020, Campbell was named to the team's starting rotation and made four starts before the season was cancelled due to the COVID-19 pandemic. He returned to the starting rotation for the 2021 season, and on May 8, 2021, he threw the 11th no-hitter in school history in a 19-0 win over the Kansas Jayhawks, striking out 11 batters. He finished the 2021 season having started 13 games, going 7–2 with a 2.57 ERA and 102 strikeouts over 84 innings. He also appeared in 42 games as a designated hitter, batting .269 with one home run, and was one of the five finalists for the John Olerud Award. Following the season's end, he was named to the USA Baseball Collegiate National Team. For the 2022 season, Campbell stopped playing as a two-way player, and began focusing only on pitching. Over 17 games (16 starts) for the season, he went 9–2 with a 3.82 ERA and 141 strikeouts over 101 1/3 innings.

== Professional career ==
Campbell was selected by the Cleveland Guardians with the 37th overall selection in the 2022 Major League Baseball draft. He signed with the team for $1.70 million.

Campbell did not play in 2022 after signing, and missed all of the 2023 season after undergoing elbow surgery. On March 20, 2024, the rookie–level Arizona Complex League Guardians placed Campbell on the full–season injured list. The transaction ended his season before it began, and further delayed his professional debut. Campbell underwent Tommy John surgery in April and wrist surgery in October. Campbell also did not play during the 2025 season.

Campbell made his professional debut in 2026 with the High-A Lake County Captains. In early May, he was promoted to the Double-A Akron RubberDucks. In June, Campbell was promoted once again, this time to the Triple-A Columbus Clippers, but was placed on the injured list with a left oblique strain suffered while warming up before his first start for the Clippers. He missed all of July and a majority of August before he was activated on August 23 when he then made his Triple-A debut. Campbell made a total of 20 starts for the 2026 season and had a 1–4 record, a 2.48 ERA, and 83 strikeouts over 69 innings. After the season, the Guardians added him to their 40-man roster to protect him from the Rule 5 draft.
