= Adrián Morejón =

Cuban baseball player (born 1999)

Adrian Morejón
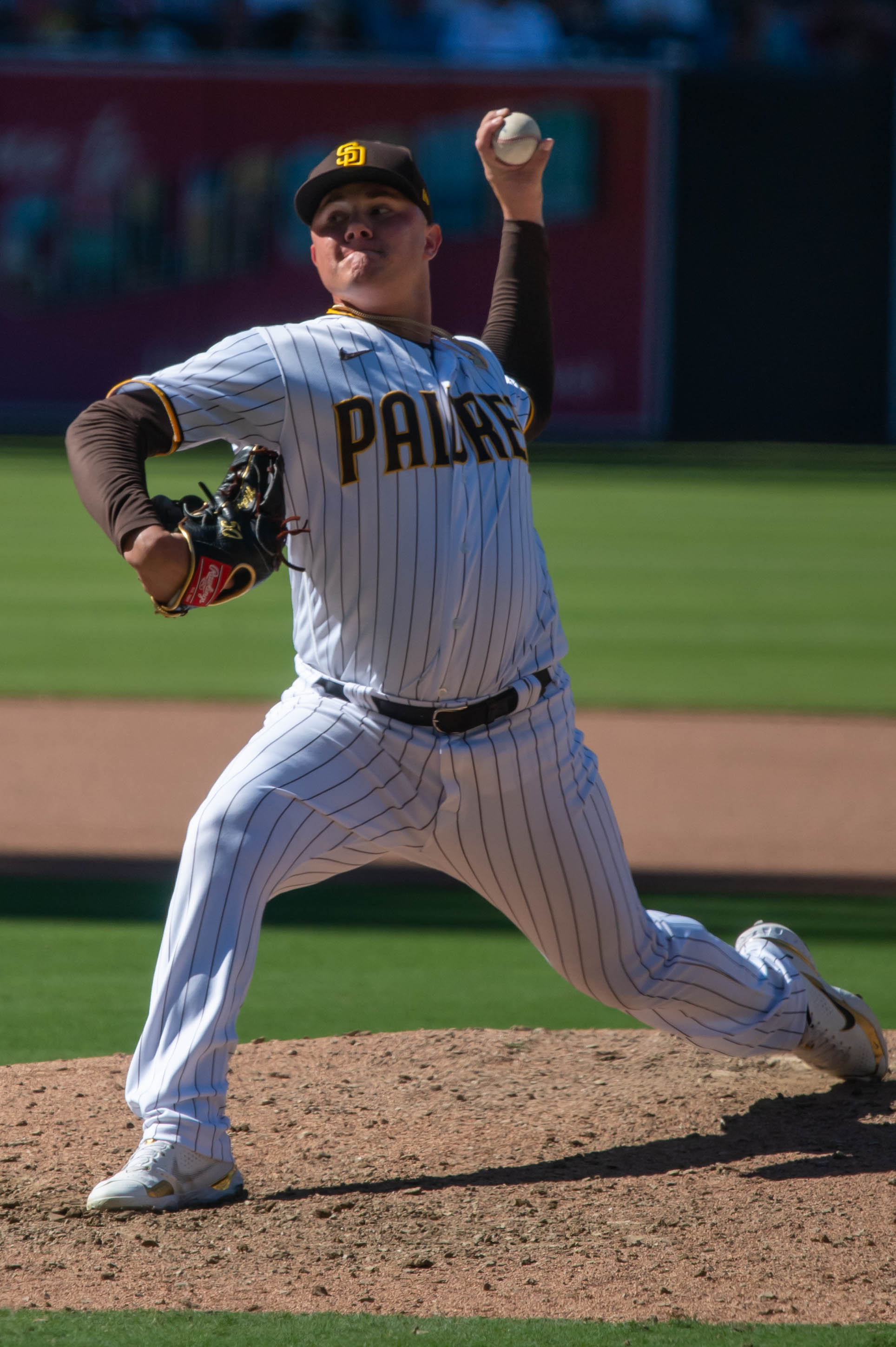
- Morejón pitching for the Padres in 2022

Free agent
- Pitcher
- Born: February 27, 1999 (age 27); Havana, Cuba
- Bats: Left Throws: Left

MLB debut
- July 21, 2019, for the San Diego Padres

MLB statistics (through 2026 season)
- Win–loss record: 32–14
- Earned run average: 3.26
- Strikeouts: 321
- Stats at Baseball Reference

Teams
- San Diego Padres (2019–2026)

Career highlights and awards
- All-Star (2025)
Medals
Men's baseball
Representing Cuba
U-15 Baseball World Cup
Gold medal – first place	2014 Mazatlán	Team
12U Baseball World Championship
Silver medal – second place	2011 Taipei	Team

Adrian Morejón Garcia (born February 27, 1999) is a Cuban professional baseball pitcher who is a free agent. He has played in Major League Baseball (MLB) for the San Diego Padres He made his MLB debut in 2019. In 2025, Morejón was named to his first All-Star game.

== Career ==
=== Cuban career ===
Morejón played for the Cuban national baseball team in the 2011 12U Baseball World Championship and the 2014 15U Baseball World Cup. He was named the most valuable player of the Baseball World Cup. He appeared in the Cuban National Series for the Huracanes de Mayabeque that year.

Morejón defected from Cuba in October 2015. He relocated to the Dominican Republic and was declared a free agent by Major League Baseball in July 2016.

=== San Diego Padres ===
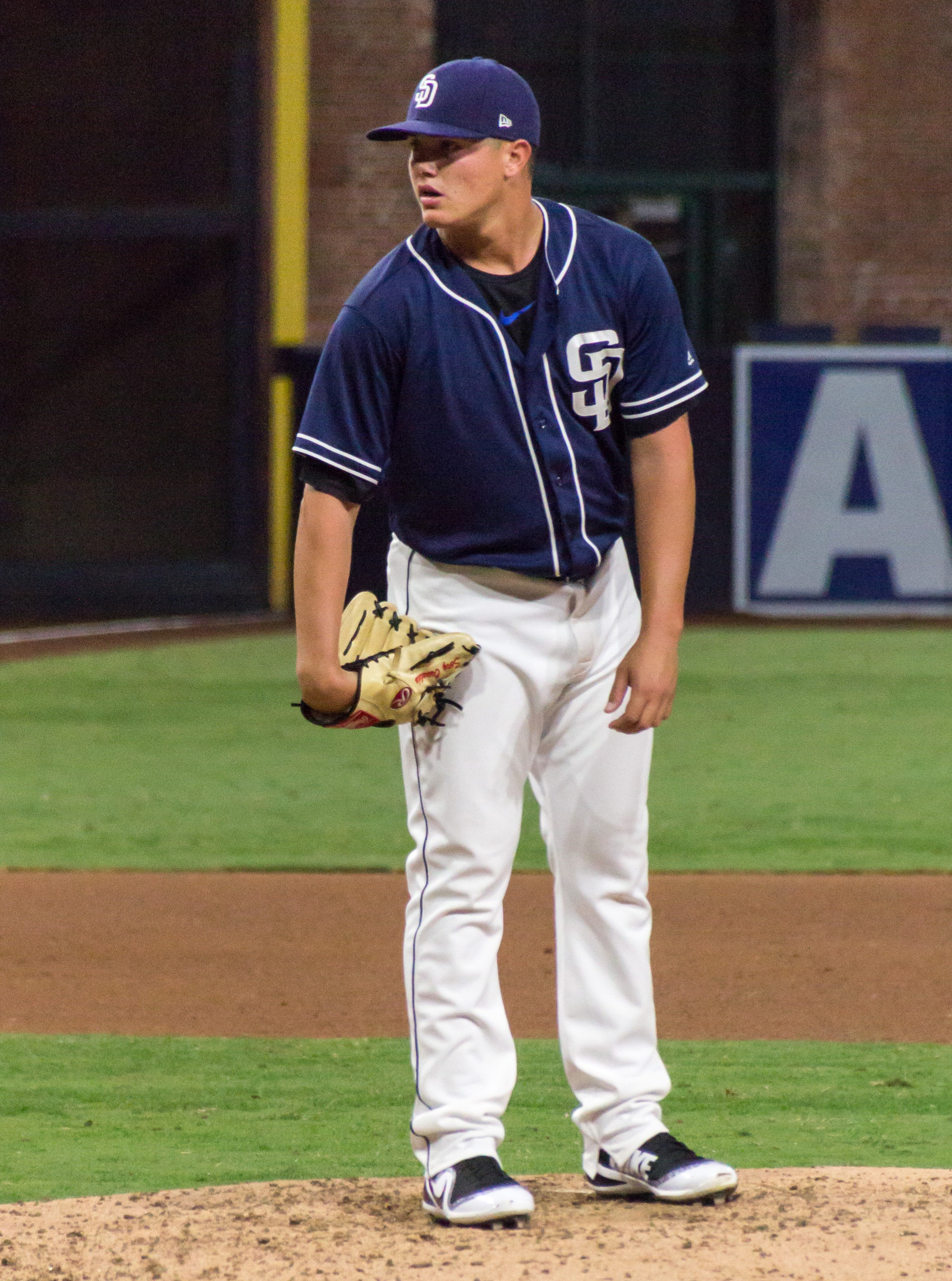
Morejón pitching in a prospects game in 2017

Morejón signed a minor league contract with the San Diego Padres, receiving an $11 million signing bonus, on July 7, 2016. He made his professional debut in 2017, spending time with both the Tri-City Dust Devils and the Fort Wayne TinCaps, posting a combined 3–4 win–loss record with a 3.86 earned run average (ERA) in 13 starts between both clubs. He spent 2018 with the Lake Elsinore Storm, going 4–4 with a 3.30 ERA in 13 starts. He began 2019 with the Amarillo Sod Poodles. Morejón was named to the 2019 All-Star Futures Game.

On July 21, 2019, the Padres selected Morejón's contract and promoted him to the major leagues. He made his major league debut that day versus the Chicago Cubs. In 2020, Morejón pitched to a 2–2 record and 4.66 ERA with 25 strikeouts in 19 1/3 innings across nine games (four games started).

Morejón departed from a game started on April 11, 2021, against the Texas Rangers after suffering a left forearm strain. On April 20, it was announced that Morejón would undergo Tommy John surgery and miss the remainder of the 2021 season. On April 23, Morejón was placed on the 60-day injured list. After rehabilitating from his surgery, Morejón returned to the Padres' active roster on June 7, 2022. He made a career–high 26 appearances for San Diego in 2022, logging a 5–1 record and 4.24 ERA with 28 strikeouts in 38.0 innings of work.

On January 13, 2023, Morejón agreed to a one-year, $800,000 contract with the Padres, avoiding salary arbitration. He was placed on the 60-day injured list to begin the season after suffering a left elbow sprain in spring training. After a rehab assignment with Low–A Lake Elsinore, Morejón was activated from the injured list on June 6 and optioned to Triple–A El Paso.

On July 11, 2025, Morejón was named an All-Star, replacing Philadelphia Phillies starting pitcher Zack Wheeler on the active roster.

== See also ==
- List of baseball players who defected from Cuba
- List of Major League Baseball players from Cuba
