= Hao-Yu Lee =

Taiwanese baseball player (born 2003)

Detroit Tigers – No. 50
- Infielder
- Born: February 3, 2003 (age 23); New Taipei, Taiwan
- Bats: Right Throws: Right

MLB debut
- April 17, 2026, for the Detroit Tigers

MLB statistics (through 2026 season)
- Batting average: .264
- Home runs: 10
- Runs batted in: 46
- Stats at Baseball Reference

Teams
- Detroit Tigers (2026–present)
Medals
Men's baseball
Representing Chinese Taipei
Asian Games
Silver medal – second place	2022 Hangzhou	Team
U-18 Baseball World Cup
Gold medal – first place	2019 Busan	Team
U-15 Baseball World Cup
Bronze medal – third place	2018 Panama	Team
U-12 Baseball World Cup
Silver medal – second place	2015 Tainan	Team

Hao-Yu Lee (Chinese: 李灝宇; pinyin: Lǐ Hàoyǔ; Amis: Kacaw ; born February 3, 2003) is a Taiwanese professional baseball infielder of Pangcah descent for the Detroit Tigers of Major League Baseball (MLB). He made his MLB debut in 2026.

== Amateur and international career ==
Lee played on the Chinese Taipei national baseball team in multiple international tournaments, including the 2015 U-12, 2018 U-15, and 2019 U-18 Baseball World Cups. He joined the national team roster for the 2026 World Baseball Classic, but withdrew due to injury.

== Professional career ==
=== Philadelphia Phillies ===
Lee was signed by the Philadelphia Phillies as an international free agent on June 15, 2021, and received a $500,000 signing bonus. After signing, he was assigned to the Rookie-level Florida Complex League Phillies, where he played in nine games and batted .364 with one home run, two doubles, two triples, and five RBI. Lee was assigned to the Clearwater Threshers of the Single-A Florida State League at the beginning of the 2022 season.

=== Detroit Tigers ===
On August 1, 2023, Lee was traded to the Detroit Tigers in exchange for pitcher Michael Lorenzen.

Lee made 126 appearances for the Triple-A Toledo Mud Hens in 2025, batting .243/.342/.406 with 14 home runs, 61 RBI, and 22 stolen bases. On November 18, 2025, the Tigers added Lee to their 40-man roster to protect him from the Rule 5 draft.

Lee was optioned to Triple-A Toledo to begin the 2026 season. On April 17, 2026, Lee was promoted to the major leagues for the first time. In his third Major League game, Lee recorded his first two hits and a run batted in. On April 26 against the Cincinnati Reds, Lee entered the game as a pinch-hitter and hit a go-ahead two-run homer off Sam Moll for his first major league home run. The Tigers faced the Houston Astros on June 15, and Lee and Kai-Wei Teng recorded the first head-to-head matchups between Taiwanese baseball players in Major League Baseball. Lee struck out and recorded a single in two at-bats against Teng. During the second half of the season, Lee hit safely in 12 consecutive games, breaking Yu Chang's record for longest hit streak by a Taiwanese MLB player. In his rookie season, Lee set Taiwanese single-season MLB records for games played (110), hits (87), RBI (46), and home runs (10), while slashing .264/.322/.424.

== See also ==
- List of Major League Baseball players from Taiwan
