= U-12 Baseball World Cup Americas Qualifier =

- Current season, competition or edition: 2024 U-12 Baseball World Cup Americas Qualifier
- Sport: Baseball
- Founded: 2016
- Continent: Americas
- Most recent champions: United States (3rd title)
- Most titles: United States (3 titles)

The U-12 Baseball World Cup Americas Qualifier is an under-12 international baseball tournament sanctioned and created by the WBSC Americas. The tournament is qualifier to the U-12 Baseball World Cup.

== Results ==
Year	Host	Final			Semifinalists	
Year	Host	Champions	Score	Runners-up	3rd place	4th place
2016	(Mexico) Puebla	Mexico	10–3	United States	Ecuador	Colombia
2018	(Mexico) Aguascalientes	United States	10–2	Mexico	Nicaragua	Venezuela
2021		Cancelled due to the COVID-19 pandemic			Cancelled due to the COVID-19 pandemic	
2023	(Mexico) Aguascalientes	United States	29–28	Venezuela	Mexico	Panama
2024	Panama City	United States	14–7	Dominican Republic	Cuba	Panama

== Medal table ==
Rank	Nation	Gold	Silver	Bronze	Total
1	United States	3	1	0	4
2	Mexico	1	1	1	3
3	Dominican Republic	0	1	0	1
3	Venezuela	0	1	0	1
5	Cuba	0	0	1	1
5	Ecuador	0	0	1	1
5	Nicaragua	0	0	1	1
Totals (7 entries)		4	4	4	12
