= 2024 U-12 Baseball World Cup Americas Qualifier =

Tournament details
- Country: Panama
- Dates: October 19 – 27, 2024
- Teams: 12

Final positions
- Champions: United States (3rd title)
- Runners-up: Dominican Republic
- Third place: Cuba
- Fourth place: Panama

The 2024 U-12 Pan American Baseball Championship (also known as the 2024 U-12 Baseball World Cup Americas Qualifier) was the 34th edition of the U-12 Pan American Baseball Championship held by the WBSC Americas. The tournament was held in Panama City, Panama. The top four teams in this tournament will qualify for the 2025 U-12 Baseball World Cup.

== First round ==
=== Group A ===
Pos	Team	Pld	W	L	RF	RA	RD	PCT	GB	Qualification
1	United States	5	5	0	0	0	0	1.000	—	Advance to Semifinal Round
2	Panama (H)	5	4	1	0	0	0	.800	1	Advance to Semifinal Round
3	Mexico	5	3	2	0	0	0	.600	2	Advance to Placement Round
4	Nicaragua	5	2	3	0	0	0	.400	3	Advance to Placement Round
5	Colombia	5	1	4	0	0	0	.200	4	Advance to Placement Round
6	Ecuador	5	0	5	0	0	0	.000	5	Advance to Placement Round

First match(es) will be played: 20 October 2024. Source: WBSC Americas
Rules for classification: 1) Wins/losses; 2) Head to head; 3) Head to head runs against; 4) Runs against; 5) Head to head
(H) Hosts

Date	Local time	Road team	Score	Home team	Inn.	Venue	Game duration	Attendance	Boxscore
Oct 20, 2024	9:30	Nicaragua	1–3	Mexico		Estadio Nacional Rod Carew			Boxscore
Oct 21, 2024	8:30	Ecuador	0–8	Colombia		Estadio Municipal Andy Alonso			Boxscore
Oct 21, 2024	10:30	United States	9–1	Nicaragua		Estadio Municipal Andy Alonso			Boxscore
Oct 21, 2024	19:00	Panama	4–1	Mexico		Estadio Nacional Rod Carew			Boxscore
Oct 22, 2024	8:30	Nicaragua	5–2	Colombia		Estadio Nacional Rod Carew			Boxscore
Oct 22, 2024	10:30	Mexico	1–9	United States		Estadio Nacional Rod Carew			Boxscore
Oct 22, 2024	12:30	Colombia	2–3	Panama		Estadio Nacional Rod Carew			Boxscore
Oct 22, 2024	19:00	Panama	10–0	Ecuador		Estadio Nacional Rod Carew			Boxscore
Oct 23, 2024	10:30	Colombia	0–5	United States		Estadio Municipal Andy Alonso			Boxscore
Oct 23, 2024	12:30	Ecuador	0–7	United States		Estadio Municipal Andy Alonso			Boxscore
Oct 23, 2024	14:30	Mexico	24–3	Ecuador		Estadio Municipal Andy Alonso			Boxscore
Oct 23, 2024	19:00	Nicaragua	3–6	Panama		Estadio Nacional Rod Carew			Boxscore
Oct 24, 2024	8:30	Colombia	0–2	Mexico		Estadio Nacional Rod Carew			Boxscore
Oct 24, 2024	10:30	Ecuador	0–5	Nicaragua		Estadio Municipal Andy Alonso			Boxscore
Oct 24, 2024	19:00	United States	7–0	Panama		Estadio Nacional Rod Carew			Boxscore

=== Group B ===
Pos	Team	Pld	W	L	RF	RA	RD	PCT	GB	Qualification
1	Dominican Republic	5	5	0	0	0	0	1.000	—	Advance to Semifinal Round
2	Cuba	5	4	1	0	0	0	.800	1	Advance to Semifinal Round
3	Puerto Rico	5	3	2	0	0	0	.600	2	Advance to Placement Round
4	Venezuela	5	2	3	0	0	0	.400	3	Advance to Placement Round
5	Brazil	5	1	4	0	0	0	.200	4	Advance to Placement Round
6	Argentina	5	0	5	0	0	0	.000	5	Advance to Placement Round

First match(es) will be played: 20 October 2024. Source: WBSC Americas
Rules for classification: 1) Wins/losses; 2) Head to head; 3) Head to head runs against; 4) Runs against; 5) Head to head

Date	Local time	Road team	Score	Home team	Inn.	Venue	Game duration	Attendance	Boxscore
Oct 20, 2024	9:00	Brazil	0–10	Dominican Republic		Estadio Municipal Andy Alonso			Boxscore
Oct 21, 2024	8:30	Argentina	0–10	Puerto Rico		Estadio Nacional Rod Carew			Boxscore
Oct 21, 2024	10:30	Venezuela	3–0	Brazil		Estadio Nacional Rod Carew			Boxscore
Oct 21, 2024	16:00	Cuba	1–6	Dominican Republic		Estadio Municipal Andy Alonso			Boxscore
Oct 22, 2024	8:30	Cuba	15–0	Argentina		Estadio Municipal Andy Alonso			Boxscore
Oct 22, 2024	10:30	Brazil	1–2	Puerto Rico		Estadio Municipal Andy Alonso			Boxscore
Oct 22, 2024	12:30	Argentina	0–13	Venezuela		Estadio Municipal Andy Alonso			Boxscore
Oct 22, 2024	14:30	Dominican Republic	5–1	Venezuela		Estadio Municipal Andy Alonso			Boxscore
Oct 23, 2024	8:30	Dominican Republic	10–2	Argentina		Estadio Municipal Andy Alonso			Boxscore
Oct 23, 2024	8:30	Brazil	0–4	Cuba		Estadio Nacional Rod Carew			Boxscore
Oct 23, 2024	10:30	Puerto Rico	5–10	Cuba		Estadio Nacional Rod Carew			Boxscore
Oct 23, 2024	12:30	Puerto Rico	7–3	Venezuela		Estadio Nacional Rod Carew			Boxscore
Oct 24, 2024	8:30	Puerto Rico	1–10	Dominican Republic		Estadio Municipal Andy Alonso			Boxscore
Oct 24, 2024	10:30	Venezuela	3–4	Cuba		Estadio Nacional Rod Carew			Boxscore
Oct 24, 2024	12:30	Argentina	0–10	Brazil		Estadio Municipal Andy Alonso			Boxscore

== Semifinal Round ==
Date	Local time	Road team	Score	Home team	Inn.	Venue	Game duration	Attendance	Boxscore
Oct 25, 2024	9:30	Cuba	0–6	United States		Estadio Nacional Rod Carew			Boxscore
Oct 25, 2024	12:30	Panama	2–3	Dominican Republic		Estadio Nacional Rod Carew			Boxscore

== Placement Round ==
Date	Local time	Road team	Score	Home team	Inn.	Venue	Game duration	Attendance	Boxscore
Oct 25, 2024	8:30	Ecuador	15–2	Argentina		Estadio Municipal Andy Alonso			Boxscore
Oct 25, 2024	10:30	Colombia	1–4	Brazil		Estadio Municipal Andy Alonso			Boxscore
Oct 25, 2024	12:30	Venezuela	9–0	Nicaragua		Estadio Municipal Andy Alonso			Boxscore
Oct 25, 2024	14:30	Puerto Rico	2–7	Mexico		Estadio Municipal Andy Alonso			Boxscore

== Third place game ==
Date	Local time	Road team	Score	Home team	Inn.	Venue	Game duration	Attendance	Boxscore
Oct 26, 2024	9:30	Cuba	5–1	Panama		Estadio Nacional Rod Carew			Boxscore

== Final ==
Date	Local time	Road team	Score	Home team	Inn.	Venue	Game duration	Attendance	Boxscore
Oct 26, 2024	12:00	United States	14–7	Dominican Republic		Estadio Nacional Rod Carew			Boxscore

== Final standings ==
Rank	Team
1st place, gold medalist(s)	United States
2nd place, silver medalist(s)	Dominican Republic
3rd place, bronze medalist(s)	Cuba
4	Panama
5	Mexico
6	Puerto Rico
7	Venezuela
8	Nicaragua
9	Brazil
10	Colombia
11	Ecuador
12	Argentina

Qualified for the 2025 U-12 World Cup
