= U-12 Softball World Cup =

- Current season, competition or edition: 2021 U-12 Softball World Cup
- Founded: 2019; 7 years ago
- Organising body: WBSC
- No. of teams: 5 (finals)
- Region: International
- Most recent champion: Chinese Taipei (2nd title)
- Most titles: Chinese Taipei (2 titles)
- Website: WBSC.org

The U-12 Softball World Cup is an international softball tournament for male and female players between age 10-12, and is the most elite and highest level of competition in its age category. It is organized by (WBSC). The tournament is held biennially, starting in 2019. The current champion is Chinese Taipei, who won the inaugural and the second competition as hosts.

The U-12 Softball World Cup is played under the WBSC's International Rules. Dimensions of regulation U-12 Softball World Cup ballparks (distance to the outfield fence, pitching mound, base paths, etc.) are significantly increased compared to local youth leagues, due to the superior nature and strength of the players involved.

== History ==
The inaugural tournament was held in Tainan, Taipei from July 26 to July 30, 2019 concurrently with the 2019 U-12 Baseball World Cup. Four teams competed in the 2019 event, and Chinese Taipei won the event's first ever title. The second edition was postponed from 2021 to December 2022 due to the COVID-19 pandemic in Taiwan, and the event is held separately from the U-12 Baseball World Cup with the number of participating teams expanded to five.

== Results ==
Year	Final Host	Medalists			
Year	Final Host	Champions	Final	Runners-up	3rd place
2019; Details	(Taiwan); Tainan	Chinese Taipei	3–2	Peru	Czech Republic
2021; Details^{2}	(Taiwan); Taichung	Chinese Taipei	3–2	Czech Republic	Singapore

^{2} Originally scheduled to be held in 2021, but due to the COVID-19 pandemic, postponed to December 2022.

=== Medal table ===
Rank	Nation	Gold	Silver	Bronze	Total
1	Chinese Taipei	2	0	0	2
2	Czech Republic	0	1	1	2
3	Peru	0	1	0	1
4	Singapore	0	0	1	1
Totals (4 entries)		2	2	2	6

== Participating nations ==
- 1st — Champion
- 2nd — Runner-up
- 3rd — Third place
- # — Position
- q — Qualified
- — Hosts

Teams	2019	2021	Years
Chinese Taipei	1st	1st	2
Czech Republic	3rd	2nd	2
Hong Kong		4th	1
India		5th	1
Indonesia	4th		1
Peru	2nd		1
Singapore		3rd	1
No. of teams	4	5	

== See also ==
- List of sporting events in Taiwan
- U-12 Baseball World Cup
