= 2025 U-15 Asian Baseball Championship =

Tournament details
- Country: Taiwan
- Dates: August 17 – 23
- Teams: 8
- Defending champions: Chinese Taipei

Final positions
- Champions: Chinese Taipei
- Runners-up: Japan
- Third place: South Korea
- Fourth place: Philippines

Tournament statistics
- Games played: 22

The 2025 U-15 Asian Baseball Championship is the 12th edition of the U-15 Asian Baseball Championship, organised by Asia's governing baseball body, the WBSC Asia. The tournament is held in Tainan, Taiwan from 17 to 23 August 2025. The top three teams of the tournament will qualify for the 2026 U-15 Baseball World Cup.

In the final, Chinese Taipei defeated the Japan 3–0 to claim their eighth title.

== Participating teams ==
- Chinese Taipei
- Hong Kong
- Japan
- Pakistan
- Philippines
- South Korea
- Sri Lanka
- Thailand

== Opening round ==
=== Group A ===
Pos	Team	Pld	W	L	RF	RA	PCT	GB	Qualification
1	South Korea	3	3	0	45	3	1.000	—	Advance to Super Round
2	Chinese Taipei (H)	3	2	1	48	5	.667	1	Advance to Super Round
3	Pakistan	3	1	2	16	53	.333	2	Advance to Placement round
4	Thailand	3	0	3	2	50	.000	3	Advance to Placement round

Source: WBSC Asia
(H) Hosts

Date	Local time	Road team	Score	Home team	Inn.	Venue	Game duration	Attendance	Boxscore
Aug 17, 2025	18:30	South Korea	5–3	Chinese Taipei	7	Asia-Pacific Main Stadium	2:30	2,426	Boxscore
Aug 17, 2025	19:30	Pakistan	16–2	Thailand	5	Asia-Pacific Secondary Field	2:16	77	Boxscore
Aug 18, 2025	18:30	Thailand	0–16	South Korea	4	Asia-Pacific Secondary Field	1:43	60	Boxscore
Aug 18, 2025	18:30	Chinese Taipei	27–0	Pakistan	4	Asia-Pacific Main Stadium	1:40	948	Boxscore
Aug 19, 2025	13:30	Pakistan	0–24	South Korea	4	Asia-Pacific Secondary Field	1:30	62	Boxscore
Aug 19, 2025	18:30	Thailand	0–18	Chinese Taipei	4	Asia-Pacific Main Stadium	1:27	909	Boxscore

=== Group B ===
Pos	Team	Pld	W	L	RF	RA	PCT	GB	Qualification
1	Japan	3	3	0	48	2	1.000	—	Advance to Super Round
2	Philippines	3	2	1	14	13	.667	1	Advance to Super Round
3	Hong Kong	3	1	2	13	20	.333	2	Advance to Placement round
4	Sri Lanka	3	0	3	5	45	.000	3	Advance to Placement round

Source: WBSC Asia

Date	Local time	Road team	Score	Home team	Inn.	Venue	Game duration	Attendance	Boxscore
Aug 17, 2025	13:30	Hong Kong	1–14	Japan	5	Asia-Pacific Main Stadium	1:33	250	Boxscore
Aug 17, 2025	13:30	Sri Lanka	1–11	Philippines	5	Asia-Pacific Secondary Field	1:27	88	Boxscore
Aug 18, 2025	13:30	Hong Kong	2–3	Philippines	7	Asia-Pacific Secondary Field	2:04	99	Boxscore
Aug 18, 2025	13:30	Japan	24–1	Sri Lanka	4	Asia-Pacific Main Stadium	1:44	168	Boxscore
Aug 19, 2025	13:30	Philippines	0–10	Japan	6	Asia-Pacific Main Stadium	1:49	112	Boxscore
Aug 19, 2025	18:30	Sri Lanka	3–10	Hong Kong	7	Asia-Pacific Secondary Field	1:46	66	Boxscore

== Placement round ==
Pos	Team	Pld	W	L	RF	RA	PCT	GB
1	Hong Kong	3	2	1	25	9	.667	—
2	Pakistan	3	2	1	25	14	.667	—
3	Sri Lanka	3	2	1	19	18	.667	—
4	Thailand	3	0	3	7	35	.000	2

Source: WBSC Asia

Date	Local time	Road team	Score	Home team	Inn.	Venue	Game duration	Attendance	Boxscore
Aug 21, 2025	13:30	Thailand	3–7	Sri Lanka	7	Asia-Pacific Secondary Field	1:53	63	Boxscore
Aug 21, 2025	18:30	Hong Kong	3–4	Pakistan	7	Asia-Pacific Secondary Field	1:48	48	Boxscore
Aug 22, 2025	13:30	Thailand	2–12	Hong Kong	5	Asia-Pacific Secondary Field	1:52	68	Boxscore
Aug 22, 2025	18:30	Sri Lanka	9–5	Pakistan	8	Asia-Pacific Secondary Field	2:21	57	Boxscore

== Super round ==
Pos	Team	Pld	W	L	RF	RA	PCT	GB	Qualification
1	Japan	3	2	1	22	11	.667	—	Advance to final
2	Chinese Taipei (H)	3	2	1	23	12	.667	—	Advance to final
3	South Korea	3	2	1	22	9	.667	—	Advance to third-place game
4	Philippines	3	0	3	1	36	.000	2	Advance to third-place game

Source: WBSC Asia
(H) Hosts

Date	Local time	Road team	Score	Home team	Inn.	Venue	Game duration	Attendance	Boxscore
Aug 21, 2025	13:30	South Korea	1–5	Japan	7	Asia-Pacific Main Stadium	2:09	287	Boxscore
Aug 21, 2025	18:30	Philippines	0–10	Chinese Taipei	6	Asia-Pacific Main Stadium	2:00	864	Boxscore
Aug 22, 2025	13:30	Philippines	1–16	South Korea	4	Asia-Pacific Main Stadium	1:24	115	Boxscore
Aug 22, 2025	18:30	Chinese Taipei	10–7	Japan	7	Asia-Pacific Main Stadium	2:18	2,210	Boxscore

== Finals ==
=== Third-place game ===
Date	Local time	Road team	Score	Home team	Inn.	Venue	Game duration	Attendance	Boxscore
Aug 23, 2025	13:00	Philippines	0–15	South Korea	4	Asia-Pacific Main Stadium	1:35	645	Boxscore

=== Final ===
Date	Local time	Road team	Score	Home team	Inn.	Venue	Game duration	Attendance	Boxscore
Aug 23, 2025	18:30	Chinese Taipei	3–0	Japan	7	Asia-Pacific Main Stadium	1:55	5,163	Boxscore

== Final standing ==
Rank	Team
1st place, gold medalist(s)	Chinese Taipei
2nd place, silver medalist(s)	Japan
3rd place, bronze medalist(s)	South Korea
4	Philippines
5	Hong Kong
6	Pakistan
7	Sri Lanka
8	Thailand

Qualified for the 2026 U-15 World Cup

== External websites ==
- Official website
