= United States national under-12 baseball team =

USA national U-12 baseball team

Information
- Country: United States
- Federation: USA Baseball
- Confederation: WBSC Americas

Uniforms
Home	Away	Alternate

Medal record

U-12 World Cup
Gold medal – first place	2013 Taipei	
Gold medal – first place	2015 Tainan	
Gold medal – first place	2017 Tainan	
Gold medal – first place	2022 Tainan	
Gold medal – first place	2023 Tainan	
Gold medal – first place	2025 Tainan	

U-12 Pan American Championship
Gold medal – first place	2018 Aguascalientes	
Gold medal – first place	2023 Aguascalientes	
Gold medal – first place	2024 Panama	
Silver medal – second place	2016 Puebla	

The United States national under-12 baseball team is the national under-12 baseball team of United States in international-level baseball competitions. As of 2025, the team have won the U-12 Baseball World Cup total in six times.

== Roster ==
The current 12U national team extended WBSC U-12 Pan American Championship in 2026.

United States roster – 2026 12U National Team Extended WBSC U-12 Pan American Championship roster
Players		Coaches
Pitchers: Wyatt Fly	Catchers: Kohen Davis; Caleb McDaniel; Antonio Rolando; Jacob Woods; Infielders: Carver Brown; Rogelio Garcia; Cash Gonzales; Koda Graziadei; Noah Kirk; Kai Rios; David Thomas II; Taz Tulowitzki; Outfielders: Aiden Green; Maverick Harwood; Jerry Hennessey; Aiden Izquierdo; Cooper Thissen	Manager: Wes Brooks; Coaches: Kyle Howell; Erick Quesada; David Houseton
Updated: November 16, 2026

== Competitive record ==
=== U-12 World Cup ===
U-12 Baseball World Cup record
Year	Result	Position	Pld	W	L	%	RS	RA
(Taiwan) 2011	Did not participate							
(Taiwan) 2013	Champions	1st	9	8	1	.889	95	6
(Taiwan) 2015	Champions	1st	9	8	1	.889	81	27
(Taiwan) 2017	Champions	1st	9	8	1	.889	107	43
(Taiwan) 2019	First round	7th	8	6	2	.750	118	21
(Taiwan) 2022 (Note: Originally scheduled to be held in 2021, but due to the COVID-19 pandemic, postponed to summer 2022.)	Champions	1st	8	8	0	1.000	99	31
(Taiwan) 2023	Champions	1st	9	7	2	.778	120	37
(Taiwan) 2025	Champions	1st	9	8	1	.889	77	19
(Taiwan) 2027	To be determined							
Total	6 Titles	7/9	61	53	8	.869	697	184

=== U-12 Pan American Championship ===
U-12 Baseball Pan American Championship record
Year	Result	Position	Pld	W	L	%	RS	RA
(Mexico) 2016	Runners-up	2nd	9	7	2	0.778	142	42
(Mexico) 2018	Champions	1st	9	9	0	1.000	127	7
2021	Cancelled due to the COVID-19 pandemic							
(Mexico) 2023	Champions	1st	7	7	0	1.000	122	51
(Panama) 2024	Champions	1st	7	7	0	1.000	57	9
(Dominican Republic) 2026	TBD		2	2	0	1.000	21	2
Total	3 Titles	5/6	34	32	2	.941	469	111
