= 2017 U-12 Baseball World Cup =

Tournament details
- Country: Taiwan
- Dates: July 28th - August 6th
- Teams: 12
- Defending champions: United States

Final positions
- Champions: United States (3rd title)
- Runners-up: Chinese Taipei
- Third place: Mexico
- Fourth place: Japan

Tournament statistics
- Games played: 50

Awards
- MVP: (United States) Kai Caranto

The 2017 U-12 Baseball World Cup is an under 12 international baseball tournament held from July 28 to August 6 in Tainan, Taiwan. It is the fourth edition of the tournament.

== Format ==
First round: The 12 participating teams were drawn into two groups of 6 for round robin. The top 3 teams from each pool advance to the Super Round while the bottom 3 teams play in the consolation round.

Consolation round: The bottom 3 teams from each pool play each of the other bottom 3 teams from the other pool (ex. The 4th place team from Group A plays the 4th, 5th, and 6th place teams from Pool B). The results of the previous round robin carry over for teams originally in the same pool (ex. The 4th place team from Group A beats both the 5th and 6th place teams from Group A in pool play and starts the consolation round with a 2-0 record.). Teams don't advance to play any more games after the consolation round.

Super Round: The top 3 teams from each pool play each of the other top 3 teams from the other pool (ex. The 1st place team from Group A plays the 1st, 2nd, and 3rd place teams from Group B). The results of the previous round robin carry over for teams originally in the same pool (ex. If the 1st place team from Group A beats both the 2nd and 3rd place teams from Group A in pool play and starts the Super Round with a 2-0 record. The 3rd and 4th place finishers advance to the Bronze Medal Game, and the 1st and 2nd place finishers advance to the Gold Medal Game.

Medal Round: The Medal Round consists of the Bronze Medal Game, contested by the 3rd and 4th place finishers from the Super Round, and the Gold Medal Game, contested by the 1st and 2nd place finishers.

== Teams ==
Twelve teams qualified for the tournament. The number in parentheses is their nations ranking in the WBSC World Rankings prior to the start of the tournament.

Pool A	Pool B
Japan (1)	United States (2)
Chinese Taipei ^{1} (4)	South Korea (3)
Mexico (6)	Australia (8)
Czech Republic (13)	Panama (14)
Brazil (18)	Nicaragua (15)
South Africa (29)	Germany (20)

== First round ==
=== Group A ===
Teams	W	L	Pct.	GB	R	RA	RD
Japan	4	1	.800	--	56	11	+45
Chinese Taipei	4	1	.800	--	63	7	+56
Mexico	4	1	.800	--	57	26	+31
Czech Republic	2	3	.400	2.0	21	53	-32
Brazil	1	4	.200	3.0	20	27	-7
South Africa	0	5	.000	4.0	1	99	-98

Due to WBSC tie-breaking procedures, Japan was awarded 1st in the group followed by Chinese Taipei and Mexico respectively. All 3 teams advanced to the Super Round.

=== Group B ===
Teams	W	L	Pct.	GB	R	RA	RD
United States	5	0	1.000	--	80	12	+68
South Korea	3	2	.600	2.0	33	31	+2
Nicaragua	3	2	.600	2.0	38	23	+15
Panama	3	2	.600	2.0	33	20	+13
Australia	1	4	.200	4.0	17	51	-34
Germany	0	5	.000	5.0	7	64	-57

Due to WBSC tie-breaking procedures, South Korea was awarded 2nd in the group followed by Nicaragua and Panama respectively. South Korea and Nicaragua advanced to the Super Round while Panama was eliminated and sent to the consolation round.

== 2nd Round ==
=== Super Round ===
Teams	W	L	Pct.	GB	R	RA	RD
Chinese Taipei	4	1	.800	--	51	11	+40
United States	4	1	.800	--	56	36	+20
Japan	3	2	.600	1.0	31	23	+8
Mexico	2	3	.400	2.0	30	38	-8
South Korea	1	4	.200	3.0	19	52	-32
Nicaragua	1	4	.200	4.0	15	37	-22

In the super round, if a team played another team that qualified for the super round, the result from the 1st round carried over to the super round. Therefore, each team played 3 games in the super round and 2 games that carried over from the first round.

Due to WBSC tie-breaking procedures, Chinese Taipei was awarded 1st in the group over the United States who was seeded 2nd, both teams advanced to the gold medal game. Also due to tie-breaking procedures, South Korea was ranked 5th and Nicaragua was ranked 6th, however both teams were still eliminated.

=== Consolation round ===
Teams	W	L	Pct.	GB	R	RA	RD
Panama	5	0	1.000	--	65	10	+55
Czech Republic	3	2	.600	2.0	37	26	+11
Brazil	3	2	.600	2.0	32	24	+8
Australia	2	3	.400	3.0	26	45	-19
South Africa	1	4	.200	4.0	28	39	-11
Germany	1	4	.200	4.0	14	51	-37

In the consolation round, if a team played another team that qualified for the consolation round, the result from the 1st round carried over to the consolation round. Therefore, each team played 3 games in the consolation round and 2 games that carried over from the first round.

Due to WBSC tie-breaking procedures, Czech Republic was finished 2nd in the consolation round over Brazil who finished 3rd. Also due to the tie-breaking procedures, South Africa was finished 5th and Germany finished 6th.

== Medal Rounds ==
Both the Gold and Bronze medal game were played at Tainan Municipal Stadium in Tainan.

=== Bronze-medal game ===
Sunday, August 6th 14:00	Mexico	1–0	Japan	Tainan Municipal Stadium; Attendance: 3000

=== Gold-medal game ===
Sunday, August 6th 18:30	United States	7–2	Chinese Taipei	Tainan Municipal Stadium; Attendance: 9500

== Final rankings ==
Rk	Team	W	L
1st place, gold medalist(s)	United States	8	1
Lost in Gold medal game
2nd place, silver medalist(s)	Chinese Taipei	7	2
Failed to qualify for Gold medal game
3rd place, bronze medalist(s)	Mexico	6	3
4	Japan	6	3
Failed to qualify for Bronze medal game
5	South Korea	3	5
6	Nicaragua	4	4
Failed to qualify for Super Round
7	Panama	6	2
8	Czech Republic	3	5
9	Brazil	3	5
10	Australia	2	6
11	South Africa	1	7
12	Germany	1	7

2017 U12 Baseball World Cup

United States
3rd title

== Statistical leaders ==
=== Batting ===
Statistic	Name	Total/Avg
Batting average*	(Panama) Adan Sanchez	.750
Hits	(United States) Benjamin Reiland	18
Runs	(United States) Benjamin Reiland	16
Doubles	4 tied with	5
Triples	7 tied with	1
Home runs	(United States) Joshua Atomanczyk	5
Home runs	(Chinese Taipei) Chen-An Pai	5
Home runs	(Mexico) Juan Tirado	5
Runs batted in	(United States) Kai Caranto	17
Walks	(Japan) Reiji Toi	9
Stolen bases	(United States) Brad Burnes	11
On-base percentage*	(Panama) Adan Sanchez	.826
Slugging percentage*	(Panama) Adan Sanchez	1.688
OPS*	(Panama) Adan Sanchez	2.514

* Minimum 2.7 plate appearances per team game

=== Pitching ===
Statistic	Name	Total/Avg
Wins	(Mexico) Juan Pablo Hernandez	4
Saves	(United States) Kai Caranto	2
Saves	(Brazil) Samuel Dos Passos	2
Innings pitched	(Mexico) Juan Pablo Hernandez	13.2
Earned run average*	(Chinese Taipei) Chia-Cheng Chao	0.69
Strikeouts	(Chinese Taipei) Chia-Cheng Chao	15
Strikeouts	(Chinese Taipei) Shuo-Heng Han	15
Walks allowed*	(Chinese Taipei) Chia-Cheng Chao	0
BAA*	(United States) Brandon Olivera	.136

* Minimum 0.8 innings pitched per team game

== See also ==
- List of sporting events in Taiwan
