= 2013 U-12 Baseball World Cup =

Tournament details
- Country: Republic of China
- Dates: July 18 - July 28
- Teams: 14

Final positions
- Champions: United States (1st title)
- Runners-up: Chinese Taipei
- Third place: Japan
- Fourth place: Venezuela

Tournament statistics
- Games played: 54
- Attendance: 32,101 (594 per game)

The 2013 U-12 Baseball World Cup was an under-12 international baseball tournament held from July 18 to July 28, 2013 in Taipei City, Taiwan.

More than 10,000 fans attended the championship game at Tianmu Baseball Stadium in which the United States beat Chinese Taipei.

== Round 1 ==
=== Group A ===
| Teams | W | L | Pct. | R | RA |
|---|---|---|---|---|---|
| Japan | 6 | 0 | 1.000 | 53 | 15 |
| Chinese Taipei^{1} | 5 | 1 | .833 | 60 | 6 |
| Brazil | 4 | 2 | .667 | 30 | 34 |
| Mexico | 3 | 3 | .500 | 42 | 22 |
| Italy | 2 | 4 | .333 | 26 | 31 |
| Czech Republic | 1 | 5 | .167 | 12 | 57 |
| Philippines | 0 | 6 | .000 | 11 | 69 |

^1 Chinese Taipei is the official IBAF designation for the team representing the state officially referred to as the Republic of China, more commonly known as Taiwan. (See also political status of Taiwan for details.)

=== Group B ===
| Teams | W | L | Pct. | R | RA |
|---|---|---|---|---|---|
| Venezuela | 6 | 0 | 1.000 | 84 | 9 |
| United States | 5 | 1 | .833 | 76 | 4 |
| South Korea | 4 | 2 | .667 | 65 | 25 |
| Panama | 3 | 3 | .500 | 63 | 12 |
| Russia | 2 | 4 | .333 | 29 | 74 |
| Hong Kong | 1 | 5 | .167 | 12 | 88 |
| Pakistan | 0 | 6 | .000 | 15 | 135 |

== Round 2 ==
Quarterfinals
B4 | Panama | 2
A1 | Japan | 4
A3 | Brazil | 0
B2 | United States | 2
A4 | Mexico | 3
B1 | Venezuela | 5
B3 | South Korea | 1
A2 | Chinese Taipei | 3

Semifinals
QF3 | Japan | 1
QF2 | United States | 9
QF4 | Venezuela | 0
QF1 | Chinese Taipei | 8

Final
SF2 | United States | 8
SF1 | Chinese Taipei | 1

== Final standings ==
| Rk | Team | W | L |
|---|---|---|---|
| 1st place, gold medalist(s) | United States | 8 | 1 |
Lost in the Final
| 2nd place, silver medalist(s) | Chinese Taipei | 7 | 2 |
Failed to qualify for Final
| 3rd place, bronze medalist(s) | Japan | 7 | 1 |
| 4 | Venezuela | 7 | 2 |
Failed to qualify for Bronze medal game
| 5 | Panama | 5 | 4 |
| 6 | South Korea | 5 | 4 |
Failed to qualify for 5th place game
| 7 | Mexico | 4 | 5 |
| 8 | Brazil | 4 | 5 |
Failed to qualify for quarterfinals
| 9 | Italy | 2 | 4 |
| 10 | Russia | 2 | 4 |
| 11 | Czech Republic | 1 | 5 |
| 12 | Hong Kong | 1 | 5 |
| 13 | Philippines | 0 | 6 |
| 14 | Pakistan | 0 | 6 |

2013 12U Baseball World champions

United States
1st title

== See also ==
- List of sporting events in Taiwan
