= 2023 U-12 Baseball World Cup =

Tournament details
- Country: Taiwan
- Dates: July 28 - August 6
- Teams: 12
- Defending champions: United States

Final positions
- Champions: United States (5th title)
- Runners-up: Chinese Taipei
- Third place: Venezuela
- Fourth place: Japan

Tournament statistics
- Games played: 50

Awards
- MVP: (United States) Tyler Early

The 2023 U-12 Baseball World Cup or the VII U-12 Baseball World Cup was an international baseball tournament held by the World Baseball Softball Confederation for players 12-year-old and younger. The 2023 edition was held in Tainan, Taiwan from July 28 to August 6, 2023.

== Format ==
The tournament will be conducted according to the following format.

First round: The twelve participating nations were drawn into two groups of 6, in which single round robin will occur. The top 3 nations from each group advances to the Super Round, while the bottom 3 nations from each group advance to the consolation round.

Consolation round: The 6 nations in this round play one game against the teams they have not played yet. (example: The 4th placed team from Group A will play the bottom three teams from Group B)

Super round: The format in the super round is similar to that of the consolation round. Each team plays the top three teams from the opposing group. (example: The 1st placed team from Group B will play the top three teams from Group A) The standings for this round will include the 2 games played against the 2 other second-round qualifiers from the team's first-round group, and the 3 games played in the second round, for a total of 5 games. The 3rd and 4th-place finishers advance to the bronze-medal game, and the 1st and 2nd-place finishers advance to the gold-medal game.

Finals: The Finals consist of the Bronze Medal Game, contested by the 3rd and 4th-place finishers, and the gold-medal game, contested by the 1st and 2nd-place finishers.

== Teams ==
The following 12 teams qualified for the tournament.

Pool A	Pool B
Australia	Czech Republic
Germany	Dominican Republic
Japan	South Korea
Mexico	New Zealand
Chinese Taipei^{1}	Panama
Venezuela	United States

^{1}Republic of China, commonly known as Taiwan, due to complicated relations with People's Republic of China, is recognized by the name Chinese Taipei by most of the international organizations in sports competitions. For more information, please see Cross-Strait relations.

== First round ==
=== Group A ===
Pos	Team	Pld	W	L	RF	RA	PCT	GB	Qualification
1	Chinese Taipei (H)	5	5	0	43	9	1.000	—	Advance to super round
2	Venezuela	5	4	1	49	8	.800	1	Advance to super round
3	Japan	5	3	2	46	16	.600	2	Advance to super round
4	Mexico	5	2	3	33	27	.400	3	Advance to placement round
5	Germany	5	1	4	10	53	.200	4	Advance to placement round
6	Australia	5	0	5	5	73	.000	5	Advance to placement round

Source: WBSC
(H) Hosts

Date	Local time	Road team	Score	Home team	Inn.	Venue	Game duration	Attendance	Boxscore
Jul 29, 2023	14:30	Australia	3-7	Germany		ASPAC B	2:05	200	Boxscore
Jul 29, 2023	14:30	Venezuela	10-0	Mexico		ASPAC Youth	1:48	400	Boxscore
Jul 29, 2023	18:30	Japan	2-3	Chinese Taipei	F/7	ASPAC Youth	1:40	6000	Boxscore
Jul 30, 2023	11:00	Venezuela	19-2	Australia	F/4	ASPAC B	1:30	200	Boxscore
Jul 30, 2023	14:30	Chinese Taipei	5-3	Mexico		ASPAC Youth	2:21	4000	Boxscore
Jul 30, 2023	18:30	Germany	0-16	Japan	F/4	ASPAC Youth	1:20	500	Boxscore
Jul 31, 2023	11:00	Mexico	14-0	Australia	F/5	ASPAC Youth	1:40	120	Boxscore
Jul 31, 2023	14:30	Japan	1-7	Venezuela		ASPAC B	1:32	200	Boxscore
Jul 31, 2023	18:30	Chinese Taipei	13-2	Germany	F/5	ASPAC Youth	1:40	1000	Boxscore
Aug 1, 2023	11:00	Australia	0-15	Japan	F/4	ASPAC Youth	1:10	150	Boxscore
Aug 1, 2023	14:30	Germany	0-10	Mexico	F/5	ASPAC B	2:08	100	Boxscore
Aug 1, 2023	18:30	Venezuela	2-4	Chinese Taipei		ASPAC Youth	1:45	2500	Boxscore
Aug 2, 2023	11:00	Mexico	6-12	Japan		ASPAC Youth	2:35	200	Boxscore
Aug 2, 2023	18:30	Germany	1-11	Venezuela	F/5	ASPAC B	1:49	200	Boxscore
Aug 2, 2023	18:30	Australia	0-18	Chinese Taipei	F/4	ASPAC Youth	1:08	3000	Boxscore

=== Group B ===
Pos	Team	Pld	W	L	RF	RA	PCT	GB	Qualification
1	Dominican Republic	5	4	1	70	26	.800 (Note: Three-way tie decided by TQB)	—	Advance to super round
2	United States	5	4	1	88	19	.800	—	Advance to super round
3	South Korea	5	4	1	53	21	.800	—	Advance to super round
4	Panama	5	2	3	41	28	.400	2	Advance to placement round
5	Czech Republic	5	1	4	17	78	.200	3	Advance to placement round
6	New Zealand	5	0	5	11	108	.000	4	Advance to placement round

Source: WBSC
Notes:

Date	Local time	Road team	Score	Home team	Inn.	Venue	Game duration	Attendance	Boxscore
Jul 29, 2023	11:00	United States	43-1	New Zealand	F/4	ASPAC B	2:22	200	Boxscore
Jul 29, 2023	11:00	South Korea	11-3	Panama		ASPAC Youth	2:13	200	Boxscore
Jul 29, 2023	18:30	Czech Republic	0-19	Dominican Republic	F/4	ASPAC B	1:40	200	Boxscore
Jul 30, 2023	11:00	Panama	4-6	United States		ASPAC Youth	2:20	600	Boxscore
Jul 30, 2023	14:30	New Zealand	7–8	Czech Republic		ASPAC B	2:04	200	Boxscore
Jul 30, 2023	18:30	Dominican Republic	8-9	South Korea		ASPAC B	2:43	300	Boxscore
Jul 31, 2023	11:00	New Zealand	0-19	Panama	F/4	ASPAC B	1:13	200	Boxscore
Jul 31, 2023	14:30	Czech Republic	5-17	South Korea	F/5	ASPAC Youth	2:20	350	Boxscore
Jul 31, 2023	18:30	United States	9-13	Dominican Republic		ASPAC B	2:43	300	Boxscore
Aug 1, 2023	11:00	Panama	10-4	Czech Republic		ASPAC B	2:10	120	Boxscore
Aug 1, 2023	14:30	Dominican Republic	23-3	New Zealand	F/4	ASPAC Youth	2:05	150	Boxscore
Aug 1, 2023	18:30	South Korea	1-5	United States		ASPAC B	2:07	150	Boxscore
Aug 2, 2023	11:00	Panama	5-7	Dominican Republic		ASPAC B	2:35	150	Boxscore
Aug 2, 2023	14:30	New Zealand	0-15	South Korea	F/4	ASPAC B	1:26	500	Boxscore
Aug 2, 2023	14:30	Czech Republic	0-25	United States	F/4	ASPAC Youth	1:42	200	Boxscore

== Super round ==
Pos	Team	Pld	W	L	RF	RA	PCT	GB	Qualification
1	Chinese Taipei (H)	5	4	1	15	15	.800	—	Advance to final
2	United States	5	3	2	36	28	.600 (Note: Three-way tie decided by TQB)	1	Advance to final
3	Japan	5	3	2	30	15	.600	1	Advance to third-place game
4	Venezuela	5	3	2	26	22	.600	1	Advance to third-place game
5	South Korea	5	1	4	18	26	.200 (Note: Head-to-head result: Dominican Republic 8-9 South Korea)	3	
6	Dominican Republic	5	1	4	24	43	.200	3	

Source: WBSC
(H) Hosts
Notes:

Date	Local time	Road team	Score	Home team	Inn.	Venue	Game duration	Attendance	Boxscore
Aug 3, 2023	11:00	South Korea	4-7	Japan		ASPAC Youth	2:06	1000	Boxscore
Aug 3, 2023	14:30	Venezuela	4-11	United States		ASPAC Youth	2:07	1500	Boxscore
Aug 3, 2023	18:30	Chinese Taipei	4-0	Dominican Republic		ASPAC Youth	1:56	2500	Boxscore
Aug 4, 2023	11:00	Japan	7-0	United States		ASPAC Youth	2:05	1500	Boxscore
Aug 4, 2023	14:30	Venezuela	8-2	Dominican Republic	F/7	ASPAC Youth	2:19	1000	Boxscore
Aug 4, 2023	18:30	South Korea	0-1	Chinese Taipei		ASPAC Youth	1:23	3000	Boxscore
Aug 5, 2023	11:00	Japan	13-1	Dominican Republic	F/5	ASPAC Youth	1:32	1000	Boxscore
Aug 5, 2023	14:30	South Korea	4-5	Venezuela	F/7	ASPAC Youth	1:58	1500	Boxscore
Aug 5, 2023	18:30	United States	11-3	Chinese Taipei		ASPAC Youth	2:08	6000	Boxscore

== Placement round ==
Pos	Team	Pld	W	L	RF	RA	PCT	GB
1	Mexico	5	5	0	71	2	1.000	—
2	Panama	5	4	1	53	12	.800	1
3	Germany	5	3	2	26	27	.600	2
4	Czech Republic	5	2	3	19	38	.400	3
5	Australia	5	1	4	23	40	.200	4
6	New Zealand	5	0	5	11	84	.000	5

Source: WBSC

Date	Local time	Road team	Score	Home team	Inn.	Venue	Game duration	Attendance	Boxscore
Aug 3, 2023	11:00	Panama	2-3	Mexico		ASPAC B	2:09	200	Boxscore
Aug 3, 2023	14:30	Australia	17-2	New Zealand	F/4	ASPAC B	1:34	200	Boxscore
Aug 3, 2023	18:30	Czech Republic	3-6	Germany		ASPAC B	2:10	200	Boxscore
Aug 4, 2023	11:00	Australia	3-13	Panama	F/5	ASPAC B	1:48	200	Boxscore
Aug 4, 2023	14:30	Czech Republic	0-15	Mexico	F/4	ASPAC B	1:20	200	Boxscore
Aug 4, 2023	18:30	New Zealand	2-11	Germany		ASPAC B	1:46	200	Boxscore
Aug 5, 2023	11:00	Australia	0-4	Czech Republic		ASPAC B	1:40	300	Boxscore
Aug 5, 2023	14:30	New Zealand	0-29	Mexico	F/4	ASPAC B	1:49	300	Boxscore
Aug 5, 2023	18:30	Germany	2-9	Panama		ASPAC B	1:59	300	Boxscore

== Finals ==
=== Third-place game ===
Date	Local time	Road team	Score	Home team	Inn.	Venue	Game duration	Attendance	Boxscore
Aug 6, 2023	14:30	Venezuela	9-8	Japan		ASPAC Youth	1:59	1000	Boxscore

=== Championship ===
Date	Local time	Road team	Score	Home team	Inn.	Venue	Game duration	Attendance	Boxscore
Aug 6, 2023	18:30	United States	10-4	Chinese Taipei		ASPAC Youth	2:20	8500	Boxscore

== Final standings ==
Rk	Team	W	L
1st place, gold medalist(s)	United States	7	2
Lost in final
2nd place, silver medalist(s)	Chinese Taipei	7	2
Failed to qualify for the final
3rd place, bronze medalist(s)	Venezuela	7	2
Lost in 3rd place game
4	Japan	6	3
Failed to qualify for the finals
5	South Korea	4	4
6	Dominican Republic	4	4
Failed to qualify for the super round
7	Mexico	5	3
8	Panama	4	4
9	Germany	3	5
10	Czech Republic	2	6
11	Australia	1	7
12	New Zealand	0	8

== See also ==
- List of sporting events in Taiwan
