= 2021 U-12 Baseball World Cup =

International under-12 baseball tournament in Tainan, Taiwan

Tournament details
- Country: Taiwan
- Dates: 28 July–7 August
- Teams: 11

Final positions
- Champions: United States (4th title)
- Runners-up: Venezuela
- Third place: Chinese Taipei
- Fourth place: Dominican Republic

Tournament statistics
- Games played: 42

Awards
- MVP: (United States) Colin Anderson

The 2021 U-12 Baseball World Cup was an under 12 international baseball tournament being held from 28 July 2022 to 7 August 2022 in Tainan, Taiwan. It was the sixth edition of the tournament. The tournament was supposed to be held in 2021 but was delayed due to the COVID-19 pandemic.

== Format ==
First round: The 11 participating teams were drawn into one group of 6 and one group of 5 for round robin. The top 3 teams from each pool advance to the Super Round while the bottom 3 (or 2) teams play in the Consolation Round.

Consolation Round: The bottom 3 (or 2) teams from each pool play each of the other bottom 3 (or 2) teams from the other pool (ex. The 4th place team from Group A plays the 4th, 5th, and 6th place teams from Pool B). The results of the previous round robin carry over for teams originally in the same pool (ex. The 4th place team from Group A beats both the 5th and 6th place teams from Group A in pool play and starts the consolation round with a 2-0 record.). Teams don't advance to play any more games after the consolation round.

Super Round: The top 3 teams from each pool play each of the other top 3 teams from the other pool (ex. The 1st place team from Group A plays the 1st, 2nd, and 3rd place teams from Group B). The results of the previous round robin carry over for teams originally in the same pool (ex. If the 1st place team from Group A beats both the 2nd and 3rd place teams from Group A in pool play and starts the Super Round with a 2-0 record. The 3rd and 4th-place finishers advance to the Bronze Medal Game, and the 1st and 2nd-place finishers advance to the Gold Medal Game.

Medal Round: The Medal Round consists of the Bronze Medal Game, contested by the 3rd and 4th-place finishers from the Super Round, and the Gold Medal Game, contested by the 1st and 2nd-place finishers.

== Teams ==
Eleven teams qualified for the tournament. The number in parentheses is their nations ranking in the WBSC World Rankings prior to the start of the tournament.

Pool A	Pool B
Chinese Taipei ^{1} (2)	Japan (1)
Mexico (4)	South Korea (3)
Venezuela (6)	United States (5)
Panama (13)	Dominican Republic (7)
Italy (17)	Czech Republic (14)
South Africa (26)	

^1 Chinese Taipei is the official WBSC designation for the team representing the state officially referred to as the Republic of China, more commonly known as Taiwan. (See also political status of Taiwan for details.)

== First round ==
=== Group A ===
Teams	W	L	Pct.	GB	R	RA	RD
Mexico	4	1	.800	–	39	5	34
Chinese Taipei	4	1	.800	–	42	14	28
Venezuela	4	1	.800	–	49	15	34
Panama	2	3	.400	2.0	41	13	28
Italy	1	4	.200	3.0	15	45	−30
South Africa	0	5	.000	4.0	0	94	−94

=== Group B ===
Teams	W	L	Pct.	GB	R	RA	RD
United States	4	0	1.000	–	63	11	52
Dominican Republic	3	1	.750	1.0	27	18	9
South Korea	2	2	.500	2.0	26	14	12
Japan	1	3	.250	3.0	24	29	–5
Czech Republic	0	4	.000	4.0	2	70	–68

== Second round ==
=== Super Round ===
Teams	W	L	Pct.	GB	R	RA	RD
United States	5	0	1.000	–	44	23	21
Venezuela	3	2	.600	2.0	35	34	1
Chinese Taipei	3	2	.600	2.0	36	22	14
Dominican Republic	2	3	.400	3.0	20	44	–24
South Korea	1	4	.200	4.0	17	22	–5
Mexico	1	4	.200	4.0	16	23	–7

=== Consolation Round ===
Teams	W	L	Pct.	GB	R	RA	RD
Japan	4	0	1.000	–	52	0	52
Panama	3	1	.750	1.0	41	7	34
Czech Republic	2	2	.500	2.0	19	25	–6
Italy	1	3	.250	3.0	21	39	–18
South Africa	0	4	.000	4.0	0	62	–62

== Medal Rounds ==
Both the Gold and Bronze medal game were played at ASPAC Youth Stadium in Tainan.

=== Bronze-medal game ===
Sunday, 7 August; 14:00	Dominican Republic	5–9	Chinese Taipei	ASPAC Youth Stadium

=== Gold-medal game ===
Sunday, 7 August; 19:45	Venezuela	2–10	United States	ASPAC Youth Stadium

== Final standings ==
Rk	Team
1st place, gold medalist(s)	United States
Lost in Final
2nd place, silver medalist(s)	Venezuela
Failed to qualify for the Final
3rd place, bronze medalist(s)	Chinese Taipei
Lost in 3rd Place Game
4	Dominican Republic
Failed to qualify for the finals
5	South Korea
6	Mexico
Failed to qualify for the super round
7	Japan
8	Panama
9	Czech Republic
10	Italy
11	South Africa

== See also ==
- List of sporting events in Taiwan
