= 2011 12U Baseball World Championship =

- 2011 12U Baseball World Championship Logo

Tournament details
- Country: Republic of China
- Dates: July 8 - July 17
- Teams: 13

Final positions
- Champions: Chinese Taipei (1st title)
- Runners-up: Cuba
- Third place: Venezuela
- Fourth place: Mexico

Tournament statistics
- Games played: 44
- Attendance: 29,790 (677 per game)

The 2011 12U Baseball World Championship was an under-12 international baseball tournament held from July 8 to July 17, 2011 in Taipei City, Taiwan. It was the first 12U Baseball World Championship ever and was won by the host, Chinese Taipei.

== Teams ==
Fourteen teams accepted the invitation for the tournament. Originally, Zimbabwe would appear in Group B, but the team withdrew from the tournament on the opening day.

Group A	Group B
Brazil	Indonesia
Chinese Taipei^{1}	Italy
Cuba	Mexico
Ecuador	Philippines
Hong Kong	South Korea
Japan	Venezuela
Lithuania	

^1 Chinese Taipei is the official IBAF designation for the team representing the state officially referred to as the Republic of China, more commonly known as Taiwan. (See also political status of Taiwan for details.)

== Round 1 ==
=== Group A ===
==== Standings ====
Teams	W	L	Pct.	GB	R	RA
Cuba	6	0	1.000	–	76	5
Chinese Taipei	4	1	.800	1½	54	11
Japan	4	2	.667	2	66	25
Brazil	3	3	.500	3	40	27
Ecuador	2	4	.333	4	23	54
Hong Kong	1	4	.200	4½	15	76
Lithuania	0	6	.000	6	7	83

==== Schedule and results ====
July 8, 2011	Lithuania	0 – 16 (F/5)	Japan	Youth Park Stadium, Taipei City; Attendance: 215
July 8, 2011		Boxscore		Youth Park Stadium, Taipei City; Attendance: 215

July 8, 2011	Hong Kong	2 – 15 (F/5)	Ecuador	Youth Park Stadium, Taipei City; Attendance: 250
July 8, 2011		Boxscore		Youth Park Stadium, Taipei City; Attendance: 250

July 8, 2011	Chinese Taipei	2 – 6	Cuba	Tianmu Baseball Stadium, Taipei City; Attendance: 2500
July 8, 2011		Boxscore		Tianmu Baseball Stadium, Taipei City; Attendance: 2500

July 9, 2011	Cuba	15 – 0 (F/4)	Lithuania	Shing-Sheng Park Baseball Stadium, Taipei City; Attendance: 150
July 9, 2011		Boxscore		Shing-Sheng Park Baseball Stadium, Taipei City; Attendance: 150

July 9, 2011	Japan	5 – 4	Brazil	Tianmu Baseball Stadium, Taipei City; Attendance: 50
July 9, 2011		Boxscore		Tianmu Baseball Stadium, Taipei City; Attendance: 50

July 9, 2011	Ecuador	1 – 10	Chinese Taipei	Tianmu Baseball Stadium, Taipei City; Attendance: 680
July 9, 2011		Boxscore		Tianmu Baseball Stadium, Taipei City; Attendance: 680

July 10, 2011	Brazil	4 – 0	Ecuador	Youth Park Stadium, Taipei City; Attendance: 200
July 10, 2011		Boxscore		Youth Park Stadium, Taipei City; Attendance: 200

July 10, 2011	Hong Kong	0 – 28 (F/4)	Cuba	Shing-Sheng Park Baseball Stadium, Taipei City; Attendance: 120
July 10, 2011		Boxscore		Shing-Sheng Park Baseball Stadium, Taipei City; Attendance: 120

July 10, 2011	Chinese Taipei	13 – 3 (F/5)	Japan	Tianmu Baseball Stadium, Taipei City; Attendance: 1900
July 10, 2011		Boxscore		Tianmu Baseball Stadium, Taipei City; Attendance: 1900

July 11, 2011	Brazil	12 – 0 (F/5)	Hong Kong	Shing-Sheng Park Baseball Stadium, Taipei City; Attendance: 85
July 11, 2011		Boxscore		Shing-Sheng Park Baseball Stadium, Taipei City; Attendance: 85

July 11, 2011	Ecuador	2 – 24 (F/4)	Japan	Youth Park Stadium, Taipei City; Attendance: 250
July 11, 2011		Boxscore		Youth Park Stadium, Taipei City; Attendance: 250

July 11, 2011	Lithuania	0 – 18 (F/4)	Chinese Taipei	Tianmu Baseball Stadium, Taipei City; Attendance: 1000
July 11, 2011		Boxscore		Tianmu Baseball Stadium, Taipei City; Attendance: 1000

July 12, 2011	Japan	16 – 2 (F/5)	Hong Kong	Youth Park Stadium, Taipei City; Attendance: 400
July 12, 2011		Boxscore		Youth Park Stadium, Taipei City; Attendance: 400

July 12, 2011	Brazil	19 – 1 (F/4)	Lithuania	Shing-Sheng Park Baseball Stadium, Taipei City; Attendance: 20
July 12, 2011		Boxscore		Shing-Sheng Park Baseball Stadium, Taipei City; Attendance: 20

July 12, 2011	Cuba	13 – 1 (F/5)	Ecuador	Tianmu Baseball Stadium, Taipei City; Attendance: 102
July 12, 2011		Boxscore		Tianmu Baseball Stadium, Taipei City; Attendance: 102

July 14, 2011	Lithuania	5 – 11	Hong Kong	Shing-Sheng Park Baseball Stadium, Taipei City; Attendance: 120
July 14, 2011		Boxscore		Shing-Sheng Park Baseball Stadium, Taipei City; Attendance: 120

July 14, 2011	Japan	2 – 4	Cuba	Tianmu Baseball Stadium, Taipei City; Attendance: 140
July 14, 2011		Boxscore		Tianmu Baseball Stadium, Taipei City; Attendance: 140

July 14, 2011	Chinese Taipei	11 – 1 (F/5)	Brazil	Tianmu Baseball Stadium, Taipei City; Attendance: 1500
July 14, 2011		Boxscore		Tianmu Baseball Stadium, Taipei City; Attendance: 1500

July 15, 2011	Ecuador	4 – 1	Lithuania	Youth Park Stadium, Taipei City; Attendance: 200
July 15, 2011		Boxscore		Youth Park Stadium, Taipei City; Attendance: 200

July 15, 2011	Cuba	10 – 0 (F/5)	Brazil	Tianmu Baseball Stadium, Taipei City; Attendance: 500
July 15, 2011		Boxscore		Tianmu Baseball Stadium, Taipei City; Attendance: 500

July 15, 2011	Hong Kong	0 – 0 (F/0)	Chinese Taipei	Tianmu Baseball Stadium, Taipei City

=== Group B ===
==== Standings ====
Teams	W	L	Pct.	GB	R	RA
Mexico	5	0	1.000	–	64	4
Venezuela	3	1	.750	1½	53	12
South Korea	3	2	.600	2	43	20
Italy	2	3	.400	3	27	54
Philippines	1	4	.200	4	20	58
Indonesia	0	4	.000	4½	10	69

==== Schedule and results ====
July 8, 2011	Venezuela	23 – 0 (F/4)	Italy	Shing-Sheng Park Baseball Stadium, Taipei City; Attendance: 50
July 8, 2011		Boxscore		Shing-Sheng Park Baseball Stadium, Taipei City; Attendance: 50

July 8, 2011	Mexico	15 – 0 (F/4)	Philippines	Tianmu Baseball Stadium, Taipei City; Attendance: 300
July 8, 2011		Boxscore		Tianmu Baseball Stadium, Taipei City; Attendance: 300

July 8, 2011	Indonesia	0 – 15 (F/4)	South Korea	Tianmu Baseball Stadium, Taipei City; Attendance: 200
July 8, 2011		Boxscore		Tianmu Baseball Stadium, Taipei City; Attendance: 200

July 9, 2011	Italy	0 – 15 (F/5)	South Korea	Youth Park Stadium, Taipei City; Attendance: 400
July 9, 2011		Boxscore		Youth Park Stadium, Taipei City; Attendance: 400

July 9, 2011	Indonesia	0 – 25 (F/4)	Mexico	Tianmu Baseball Stadium, Taipei City; Attendance: 150
July 9, 2011		Boxscore		Tianmu Baseball Stadium, Taipei City; Attendance: 150

July 10, 2011	Philippines	4 – 13	Italy	Shing-Sheng Park Baseball Stadium, Taipei City; Attendance: 120
July 10, 2011		Boxscore		Shing-Sheng Park Baseball Stadium, Taipei City; Attendance: 120

July 10, 2011	South Korea	6 – 10	Venezuela	Tianmu Baseball Stadium, Taipei City; Attendance: 200
July 10, 2011		Boxscore		Tianmu Baseball Stadium, Taipei City; Attendance: 200

July 11, 2011	Philippines	15 – 6	Indonesia	Youth Park Stadium, Taipei City; Attendance: 150
July 11, 2011		Boxscore		Youth Park Stadium, Taipei City; Attendance: 150

July 11, 2011	Venezuela	3 – 6	Mexico	Tianmu Baseball Stadium, Taipei City; Attendance: 527
July 11, 2011		Boxscore		Tianmu Baseball Stadium, Taipei City; Attendance: 527

July 12, 2011	Mexico	9 – 1	South Korea	Tianmu Baseball Stadium, Taipei City; Attendance: 83
July 12, 2011		Boxscore		Tianmu Baseball Stadium, Taipei City; Attendance: 83

July 12, 2011	Italy	14 – 4 (F/5)	Indonesia	Youth Park Stadium, Taipei City; Attendance: 300
July 12, 2011		Boxscore		Youth Park Stadium, Taipei City; Attendance: 300

July 14, 2011	Philippines	0 – 17 (F/4)	Venezuela	Youth Park Stadium, Taipei City; Attendance: 200
July 14, 2011		Boxscore		Youth Park Stadium, Taipei City; Attendance: 200

July 14, 2011	Italy	0 – 9	Mexico	Youth Park Stadium, Taipei City; Attendance: 125
July 14, 2011		Boxscore		Youth Park Stadium, Taipei City; Attendance: 125

July 15, 2011	South Korea	7 – 1	Philippines	Shing-Sheng Park Baseball Stadium, Taipei City; Attendance: 75
July 15, 2011		Boxscore		Shing-Sheng Park Baseball Stadium, Taipei City; Attendance: 75

July 15, 2011	Venezuela	0 – 0 (F/0)	Indonesia	Youth Park Stadium, Taipei City

== Round 2 ==
=== 5th to 8th place semifinals ===
July 16, 2011	Japan	8 – 1	Italy	Youth Park Stadium, Taipei City; Attendance: 270
July 16, 2011		Boxscore		Youth Park Stadium, Taipei City; Attendance: 270

July 16, 2011	South Korea	5 – 6	Brazil	Youth Park Stadium, Taipei City; Attendance: 400
July 16, 2011		Boxscore		Youth Park Stadium, Taipei City; Attendance: 400

=== Semifinals ===
July 16, 2011	Cuba	4 – 2	Venezuela	Tianmu Baseball Stadium, Taipei City; Attendance: 493
July 16, 2011		Boxscore		Tianmu Baseball Stadium, Taipei City; Attendance: 493

July 16, 2011	Mexico	1 – 7	Chinese Taipei	Tianmu Baseball Stadium, Taipei City; Attendance: 4520
July 16, 2011		Boxscore		Tianmu Baseball Stadium, Taipei City; Attendance: 4520

== Finals ==
=== 11th place game ===
July 16, 2011	Indonesia	5 – 9	Hong Kong	Shing-Sheng Park Baseball Stadium, Taipei City; Attendance: 200
July 16, 2011		Boxscore		Shing-Sheng Park Baseball Stadium, Taipei City; Attendance: 200

=== 9th place game ===
July 16, 2011	Ecuador	2 – 7	Philippines	Shing-Sheng Park Baseball Stadium, Taipei City; Attendance: 200
July 16, 2011		Boxscore		Shing-Sheng Park Baseball Stadium, Taipei City; Attendance: 200

=== 7th place game ===
July 17, 2011	South Korea	7 – 6 (F/7)	Italy	Youth Park Stadium, Taipei City; Attendance: 420
July 17, 2011		Boxscore		Youth Park Stadium, Taipei City; Attendance: 420

=== 5th place game ===
July 17, 2011	Brazil	0 – 2 (F/4)	Japan	Youth Park Stadium, Taipei City; Attendance: 480
July 17, 2011		Boxscore		Youth Park Stadium, Taipei City; Attendance: 480

=== Bronze medal game ===
July 17, 2011	Venezuela	12 – 4	Mexico	Tianmu Baseball Stadium, Taipei City; Attendance: 310
July 17, 2011		Boxscore		Tianmu Baseball Stadium, Taipei City; Attendance: 310

=== Gold medal game ===
July 17, 2011	Cuba	2 – 3	Chinese Taipei	Tianmu Baseball Stadium, Taipei City; Attendance: 9235
July 17, 2011		Boxscore		Tianmu Baseball Stadium, Taipei City; Attendance: 9235

== Final standings ==
Rk	Team	W	L
1	Chinese Taipei	6	1
Lost in the Final
2	Cuba	7	1
Failed to qualify for Final
3	Venezuela	4	2
4	Mexico	5	2
Failed to qualify for Bronze medal game
5	Japan	6	2
6	Brazil	4	4
Failed to qualify for 5th place game
7	South Korea	4	3
8	Italy	2	5
Failed to qualify for 7th place game
9	Philippines	2	4
10	Ecuador	2	5
Failed to qualify for 9th place game
11	Hong Kong	2	4
12	Indonesia	0	5
Failed to qualify for 11th place game
13	Lithuania	0	6

2011 12U Baseball World champions

Chinese Taipei
1st title

== See also ==
- List of sporting events in Taiwan
