= 2015 U-12 Baseball World Cup =

Tournament details
- Country: (Taiwan) Republic of China
- Dates: July 23 - August 2
- Teams: 12
- Defending champions: United States

Final positions
- Champions: United States (2nd title)
- Runners-up: Chinese Taipei
- Third place: Nicaragua
- Fourth place: Cuba

Tournament statistics
- Games played: 50
- Attendance: 53,022 (1,060 per game)
- Best BA: (United States) Davis Diaz (.571)
- Most HRs: (United States) Jack Ryan (3)
- Most SBs: (Brazil) Andrew Sato (11)
- Best ERA: (Nicaragua) Lesther Medrano (0.00)
- Most Ks (as pitcher): (Chinese Taipei) Hao-En Chen (Japan) Naoki Ito (Cuba) Ernesto Cabrera (18)

The 2015 12U Baseball World Cup was an under-12 international baseball tournament held from July 23 to August 2 in Taipei City, Taiwan.

== Teams ==
Twelve teams qualified for the tournament. The number in parentheses is their nations ranking in the WBSC World Rankings prior to the start of the tournament.

Pool A	Pool B
Brazil	Australia
Chinese Taipei ^{1}	France
Cuba	Japan
Russia	Mexico
South Korea	Nicaragua
Venezuela	United States

== First round ==
=== Group A ===
Teams	W	L	Pct.	GB
Chinese Taipei	5	0	1.000	--
Cuba	4	1	.800	1.0
Venezuela	3	2	.600	2.0
South Korea	2	3	.400	3.0
Brazil	1	4	.200	4.0
Russia	0	5	.000	5.0

=== Group B ===
Teams	W	L	Pct.	GB
United States	5	0	1.000	--
Nicaragua	4	1	.800	1.0
Japan	3	2	.600	2.0
Mexico	2	3	.400	3.0
Australia	1	4	.200	4.0
France	0	5	.000	5.0

== 2nd Round ==
=== Super Round ===
Teams	W	L	Pct.	GB
Chinese Taipei	4	1	.800	--
United States	4	1	.800	--
Nicaragua	3	2	.600	1.0
Cuba	2	3	.400	2.0
Venezuela	1	4	.200	3.0
Japan	1	4	.200	4.0

=== Consolation Round ===
Teams	W	L	Pct.	GB
Mexico	5	0	1.000	--
South Korea	4	1	.800	1.0
Brazil	3	2	.600	2.0
Australia	2	3	.400	3.0
France	1	4	.200	4.0
Russia	0	5	.000	5.0

== Medal Rounds ==
Both the Gold and Bronze medal game were played at Tainan Municipal Stadium in Tainan.

=== Bronze-medal game ===
Sunday, August 2nd 14:00	Cuba	0–2	Nicaragua	Tainan Municipal Stadium; Attendance: 3,100

=== Gold-medal game ===
Sunday, August 2nd 18:30	United States	7–2	Chinese Taipei	Tainan Municipal Stadium; Attendance: 11,000

== Final rankings ==
Rk	Team	W	L
1st place, gold medalist(s)	United States	8	1
Lost in Gold medal game
2nd place, silver medalist(s)	Chinese Taipei	7	2
Failed to qualify for Gold medal game
3rd place, bronze medalist(s)	Nicaragua	7	2
4	Cuba	5	4
Failed to qualify for Bronze medal game
5	Venezuela	5	3
6	Japan	3	5
Failed to qualify for Super Round
7	Mexico	5	3
8	South Korea	4	4
9	Brazil	3	5
10	Australia	2	6
11	France	1	7
12	Russia	0	8

2015 U12 Baseball World Cup

United States
2nd title

== See also ==
- List of sporting events in Taiwan
