= 2025 U-12 Baseball World Cup =

Tournament details
- Country: Taiwan
- Dates: July 25 - August 3
- Teams: 12

Final positions
- Champions: United States (6th title)
- Runners-up: Japan
- Third place: South Korea
- Fourth place: Chinese Taipei

Tournament statistics
- Games played: 50

Awards
- MVP: (United States) Christopher Chikodroff

The 2025 U-12 Baseball World Cup or the VIII U-12 Baseball World Cup was an international baseball tournament held by the World Baseball Softball Confederation for players 12-year-old and younger. The 2025 edition was held in Tainan, Taiwan from July 25 to August 3, 2025.

== Format ==
First round: The twelve participating nations were drawn into two groups of 6, in which single round robin will occur. The top 3 nations from each group advances to the Super Round, while the bottom 3 nations from each group advance to the consolation round.

Consolation round: The 6 nations in this round play one game against the teams they have not played yet. (example: The 4th placed team from Group A will play the bottom three teams from Group B)

Super round: The format in the super round is similar to that of the consolation round. Each team plays the top three teams from the opposing group. (example: The 1st placed team from Group B will play the top three teams from Group A) The standings for this round will include the 2 games played against the 2 other second-round qualifiers from the team's first-round group, and the 3 games played in the second round, for a total of 5 games. The 3rd and 4th-place finishers advance to the bronze-medal game, and the 1st and 2nd-place finishers advance to the gold-medal game.

Finals: The Finals consist of the Bronze Medal Game, contested by the 3rd and 4th-place finishers, and the gold-medal game, contested by the 1st and 2nd-place finishers.

== Teams ==
The following 12 teams qualified for the tournament.

Pool A	Pool B
Australia	Czech Republic
Cuba	Dominican Republic
Germany	South Korea
Japan	Panama
Mexico	South Africa
Chinese Taipei^{1}	United States

^{1}Republic of China, commonly known as Taiwan, due to complicated relations with People's Republic of China, is recognized by the name Chinese Taipei by most of the international organizations in sports competitions. For more information, please see Cross-Strait relations.

== First round ==
=== Group A ===
Pos	Team	Pld	W	L	RF	RA	PCT	GB	Qualification
1	Japan	5	4	1	49	9	.800 (Note: Three-way tie decided by TQB)	—	Advance to super round
2	Mexico	5	4	1	34	13	.800	—	Advance to super round
3	Chinese Taipei (H)	5	4	1	44	15	.800	—	Advance to super round
4	Cuba	5	2	3	29	16	.400	2	Advance to placement round
5	Australia	5	1	4	11	59	.200	3	Advance to placement round
6	Germany	5	0	5	4	59	.000	4	Advance to placement round

Source: WBSC
(H) Hosts
Notes:

Date	Local time	Road team	Score	Home team	Inn.	Venue	Game duration	Attendance	Boxscore
July 25, 2025	10:30	Australia	0–10	Mexico	F/5	ASPAC Youth, Tainan City	1:43	500	Boxscore
July 25, 2025	14:30	Germany	0–17	Japan	F/4	ASPAC Youth, Tainan City	1:15	250	Boxscore
July 25, 2025	18:30	Cuba	3–6	Chinese Taipei		ASPAC Youth, Tainan City	1:59	2000	Boxscore
July 26, 2025	10:30	Germany	1–9	Mexico		ASPAC B, Tainan City	1:39	120	Boxscore
July 26, 2025	14:30	Cuba	0–4	Japan		ASPAC B, Tainan City	1:23	800	Boxscore
July 26, 2025	18:30	Chinese Taipei	13–0	Australia	F/5	ASPAC Youth, Tainan City	1:40	3200	Boxscore
July 27, 2025	10:30	Mexico	3–0	Cuba		ASPAC Youth, Tainan City	1:55	75	Boxscore
July 27, 2025	18:30	Japan	7–2	Chinese Taipei		ASPAC Youth, Tainan City	2:09	5900	Boxscore
July 27, 2025	18:30	Australia	9–2	Germany		ASPAC B, Tainan City	2:31	210	Boxscore
July 28, 2025	18:30	Chinese Taipei	17–0	Germany	F/4	ASPAC Youth, Tainan City	1:26	650	Boxscore
July 29, 2025	10:30	Australia	0–15	Japan	F/4	ASPAC Youth, Tainan City	1:10		Boxscore
July 29, 2025	10:30	Germany	1–7	Cuba		ASPAC B, Tainan City	1:47		Boxscore
July 29, 2025	16:30	Mexico	5–6	Chinese Taipei		ASPAC Youth, Tainan City	2:24		Boxscore
July 30, 2025	10:30	Japan	6–7	Mexico		ASPAC Youth, Tainan City	1:56	350	Boxscore
July 30, 2025	10:30	Cuba	19–2	Australia	F/5	ASPAC B, Tainan City	1:53	150	Boxscore

=== Group B ===
Pos	Team	Pld	W	L	RF	RA	PCT	GB	Qualification
1	South Korea	5	5	0	49	7	1.000	—	Advance to super round
2	United States	5	4	1	49	12	.800	1	Advance to super round
3	Dominican Republic	5	3	2	56	26	.600	2	Advance to super round
4	Panama	5	2	3	24	23	.400	3	Advance to placement round
5	Czech Republic	5	1	4	22	40	.200	4	Advance to placement round
6	South Africa	5	0	5	1	93	.000	5	Advance to placement round

Source: WBSC

Date	Local time	Road team	Score	Home team	Inn.	Venue	Game duration	Attendance	Boxscore
July 25, 2025	10:30	Dominican Republic	14–8	Czech Republic		ASPAC B, Tainan City	2:00	75	Boxscore
July 25, 2025	14:30	United States	8–2	Panama		ASPAC B, Tainan City	1:51	350	Boxscore
July 25, 2025	19:30	South Africa	0–17	South Korea	F/4	ASPAC B, Tainan City	1:22	430	Boxscore
July 26, 2025	10:30	Czech Republic	0–6	United States		ASPAC Youth, Tainan City	1:25	600	Boxscore
July 26, 2025	14:30	South Africa	1–11	Panama	F/5	ASPAC Youth, Tainan City	1:31	250	Boxscore
July 26, 2025	18:30	South Korea	8–3	Dominican Republic		ASPAC B, Tainan City	2:06	300	Boxscore
July 27, 2025	10:30	United States	26–0	South Africa	F/4	ASPAC B, Tainan City	1:31	150	Boxscore
July 27, 2025	14:30	Czech Republic	0–14	South Korea	F/5	ASPAC Youth, Tainan City	1:40	250	Boxscore
July 27, 2025	14:30	Dominican Republic	10–3	Panama		ASPAC B, Tainan City	1:54	150	Boxscore
July 28, 2025	10:30	Panama	6–0	Czech Republic		ASPAC Youth, Tainan City	1:43	110	Boxscore
July 28, 2025	10:30	South Africa	0–25	Dominican Republic	F/4	ASPAC B, Tainan City	1:32	200	Boxscore
July 28, 2025	18:30	South Korea	6–2	United States		ASPAC B, Tainan City	2:12	300	Boxscore
July 29, 2025	13:30	Czech Republic	14–0	South Africa	F/5	ASPAC B, Tainan City	1:33		Boxscore
July 29, 2025	13:30	Dominican Republic	4–7	United States		ASPAC Youth, Tainan City	2:00		Boxscore
July 29, 2025	16:30	Panama	2–4	South Korea		ASPAC B, Tainan City	1:29		Boxscore

== Super round ==
Pos	Team	Pld	W	L	RF	RA	PCT	GB	Qualification
1	United States	5	4	1	21	6	.800	—	Advance to final
2	Japan	5	3	2	14	14	.600 (Note: Head-to-head wins: Japan 2, Chinese Taipei 1, South Korea 0)	1	Advance to final
3	Chinese Taipei (H)	5	3	2	25	15	.600	1	Advance to third-place game
4	South Korea	5	3	2	14	16	.600	1	Advance to third-place game
5	Dominican Republic	5	1	4	19	23	.200 (Note: Head-to-head result: Dominican Republic 9–4 Mexico)	3	
6	Mexico	5	1	4	6	25	.200	3	

Source: WBSC
(H) Hosts
Notes:

Date	Local time	Road team	Score	Home team	Inn.	Venue	Game duration	Attendance	Boxscore
July 31, 2025	10:30	United States	7–1	Mexico		ASPAC Youth, Tainan City	1:50	200	Boxscore
July 31, 2025	14:30	South Korea	0–4	Japan		ASPAC Youth, Tainan City	1:46	568	Boxscore
July 31, 2025	18:30	Chinese Taipei	9–4	Dominican Republic		ASPAC Youth, Tainan City	2:11	1572	Boxscore
Aug 1, 2025	14:30	Dominican Republic	6–10	Japan		ASPAC Youth, Tainan City	1:58	232	Boxscore
Aug 1, 2025	18:30	Chinese Taipei	5–6	United States		ASPAC Youth, Tainan City	2:06	2373	Boxscore
Aug 1, 2025	18:30	Mexico	1–9	South Korea		ASPAC B, Tainan City	2:09	160	Boxscore
Aug 2, 2025	18:15	Chinese Taipei	11–5	South Korea	F/9	ASPAC Youth, Tainan City	3:14		Boxscore
Aug 2, 2025	18:30	United States	8–0	Japan		ASPAC Youth, Tainan City	1:45	75	Boxscore
Aug 3, 2025	14:45	Dominican Republic	9–4	Mexico		ASPAC Youth, Tainan City	2:02	75	Boxscore

== Placement round ==
Pos	Team	Pld	W	L	RF	RA	PCT	GB
1	Cuba	5	5	0	36	2	1.000	—
2	Panama	4	3	1	15	11	.750	1.5
3	Australia	4	2	2	14	15	.500	2.5
4	Czech Republic	5	2	3	14	21	.400	3
5	Germany	4	1	3	8	15	.250	3.5
6	South Africa	4	0	4	3	26	.000	4.5

Source: WBSC

Date	Local time	Road team	Score	Home team	Inn.	Venue	Game duration	Attendance	Boxscore
July 31, 2025	10:30	South Africa	3–6	Germany		ASPAC B, Tainan City	1:23	72	Boxscore
July 31, 2025	14:30	Australia	11–2	Czech Republic		ASPAC Youth, Tainan City	1:55	145	Boxscore
July 31, 2025	18:30	Panama	2–8	Cuba		ASPAC B, Tainan City	1:28	75	Boxscore
Aug 1, 2025	10:30	Germany	–	Panama		ASPAC Youth, Tainan City			
Aug 1, 2025	10:30	South Africa	–	Australia		ASPAC B, Tainan City			
Aug 1, 2025	14:30	Czech Republic	0–8	Cuba		ASPAC B, Tainan City	1:33	168	Boxscore
Aug 3, 2025	12:15	Germany	2–12	Czech Republic	F/5	ASPAC Youth, Tainan City	1:42		Boxscore
Aug 3, 2025	12:15	Australia	3–13	Panama	F/5	ASPAC B, Tainan City			Boxscore
Aug 3, 2025	14:45	South Africa	0–20	Cuba	F/4	ASPAC B, Tainan City	1:09	50	Boxscore

== Finals ==
=== Third-place game ===
Date	Local time	Road team	Score	Home team	Inn.	Venue	Game duration	Attendance	Boxscore
Aug 3, 2025	10:00	South Korea	2–0	Chinese Taipei		ASPAC Youth, Tainan City	1:37		Boxscore

=== Championship ===
Date	Local time	Road team	Score	Home team	Inn.	Venue	Game duration	Attendance	Boxscore
Aug 3, 2025	10:00	Japan	1–7	United States		ASPAC B, Tainan City	1:33		Boxscore

== Final standings ==
Rk	Team	W	L
1st place, gold medalist(s)	United States	8	1
Lost in final
2nd place, silver medalist(s)	Japan	6	3
Failed to qualify for the final
3rd place, bronze medalist(s)	South Korea	7	2
Lost in 3rd place game
4	Chinese Taipei	6	3
Failed to qualify for the finals
5	Dominican Republic	4	4
6	Mexico	4	4
Failed to qualify for the super round
7	Cuba	5	3
8	Panama	3	4
9	Australia	2	5
10	Czech Republic	2	6
11	Germany	1	6
12	South Africa	0	7
