= 2019 U-12 Baseball World Cup =

Tournament details
- Country: Republic of China
- Dates: July 26th - August 4th
- Teams: 12
- Defending champions: United States

Final positions
- Champions: Chinese Taipei
- Runners-up: Japan
- Third place: Cuba
- Fourth place: South Korea

Tournament statistics
- Games played: 50
- Best BA: (Czech Republic) Kristýna El Ghannamová (.692)
- Most HRs: (Venezuela) Leonel Dominguez (6)
- Most SBs: (South Korea) Hyunseo Na (12)
- Best ERA: (Cuba) Alejandro Prieto (0.42)

Awards
- MVP: (Chinese Taipei) Chen Kai-Sheng

The 2019 U-12 Baseball World Cup is an under 12 international baseball tournament being held from July 26 to August 4 in Tainan, Taiwan. It is the fifth edition of the tournament.

== Format ==
First round: The 12 participating teams were drawn into two groups of 6 for round robin. The top 3 teams from each pool advance to the super round while the bottom 3 teams play in the consolation round.

Consolation round: The bottom 3 teams from each pool play each of the other bottom 3 teams from the other pool (e.g. the 4th-place team from group A plays the 4th-, 5th-, and 6th-place teams from pool B). The results of the previous round robin carry over for teams originally in the same pool (ex. The 4th-place team from Group A beats both the 5th- and 6th-place teams from Group A in pool play and starts the consolation round with a 2-0 record.). Teams don't advance to play any more games after the consolation round.

Super round: The top 3 teams from each pool play each of the other top 3 teams from the other pool (e.g. the 1st-place team from Group A plays the 1st-, 2nd-, and 3rd-place teams from group B). The results of the previous round robin carry over for teams originally in the same pool (ex. If the 1st-place team from group A beats both the 2nd- and 3rd-place teams from group A in pool play and starts the super round with a 2-0 record. The 3rd- and 4th-place finishers advance to the bronze-medal game, and the 1st and 2nd-place finishers advance to the gold-medal game.

Medal round: The medal round consists of the Bronze Medal Game, contested by the 3rd and 4th-place finishers from the super round, and the gold-medal game, contested by the 1st and 2nd-place finishers.

== Teams ==
Twelve teams qualified for the tournament. The number in parentheses is their nations ranking in the WBSC World Rankings prior to the start of the tournament.

Pool A	Pool B
Japan (1)	United States (2)
Chinese Taipei ^{1} (4)	South Korea (3)
Cuba (5)	Mexico (6)
Czech Republic (18)	Australia (7)
South Africa (23)	Venezuela (9)
Fiji (NR)	Italy (16)

^1 Chinese Taipei is the official WBSC designation for the team representing the state officially referred to as the Republic of China, more commonly known as Taiwan. (See also political status of Taiwan for details.)

== First round ==
=== Group A ===
Pos	Team	Pld	W	L	RF	RA	PCT	GB	Qualification
1	Japan	5	5	0	79	4	1.000	—	Advance to super round
2	Chinese Taipei (H)	5	4	1	75	9	.800	1	Advance to super round
3	Cuba	5	3	2	47	11	.600	2	Advance to super round
4	Czech Republic	5	2	3	51	47	.400	3	Advance to consolation round
5	South Africa	5	1	4	32	70	.200	4	Advance to consolation round
6	Fiji	5	0	5	4	147	.000	5	Advance to consolation round

Source: WBSC
(H) Hosts

Date	Local time	Road team	Score	Home team	Inn.	Venue	Game duration	Attendance	Boxscore
Jul 26, 2019	10:00	Japan	21–0	Czech Republic	F/4	ASPAC Youth	1:37	250	Boxscore
Jul 26, 2019	14:00	South Africa	28–2	Fiji	F/4	Shan-Hwa	2:30	250	Boxscore
Jul 26, 2019	18:30	Cuba	2–4	Chinese Taipei	F/6	ASPAC Youth	1:20	7,928	Boxscore
Jul 27, 2019	10:00	Czech Republic	30–1	Fiji	F/4	ASPAC B	1:45	200	Boxscore
Jul 27, 2019	14:00	Cuba	0–6	Japan	F/6	ASPAC Youth	1:43	480	Boxscore
Jul 27, 2019	18:30	Chinese Taipei	19–0	South Africa	F/4	ASPAC Youth	1:23	996	Boxscore
Jul 28, 2019	10:00	Fiji	1–27	Cuba	F/4	ASPAC B	1:07	117	Boxscore
Jul 28, 2019	14:00	Czech Republic	21–4	South Africa	F/5	ASPAC B	2:10	300	Boxscore
Jul 28, 2019	18:30	Japan	7–4	Chinese Taipei	F/6	ASPAC Youth	1:53	5,470	Boxscore
Jul 29, 2019	10:00	Fiji	0–30	Japan	F/4	ASPAC Youth	1:27	180	Boxscore
Jul 29, 2019	14:00	South Africa	0–13	Cuba	F/5	Shan-Hwa	1:19	138	Boxscore
Jul 29, 2019	18:30	Chinese Taipei	16–0	Czech Republic	F/5	ASPAC Youth	1:37	746	Boxscore
Jul 30, 2019	14:00	South Africa	0–15	Japan	F/4	ASPAC Youth	1:13	250	Boxscore
Jul 30, 2019	14:00	Czech Republic	0–5	Cuba	F/6	Shan-Hwa	1:20	100	Boxscore
Jul 30, 2019	18:30	Fiji	0–32	Chinese Taipei	F/4	ASPAC Youth	1:18	785	Boxscore

=== Group B ===
Pos	Team	Pld	W	L	RF	RA	PCT	GB	Qualification
1	South Korea	5	4	1	48	17	.800 (Note: Head-to-head result: Mexico 0–7 South Korea)	—	Advance to super round
2	Mexico	5	4	1	34	16	.800	—	Advance to super round
3	Venezuela	5	3	2	46	22	.600 (Note: Head-to-head result: Venezuela 7–6 United States)	1	Advance to super round
4	United States	5	3	2	57	21	.600	1	Advance to consolation round
5	Italy	5	1	4	7	59	.200	3	Advance to consolation round
6	Australia	5	0	5	6	63	.000	4	Advance to consolation round

Source: WBSC
Notes:

Date	Local time	Road team	Score	Home team	Inn.	Venue	Game duration	Attendance	Boxscore
Jul 26, 2019	10:00	Italy	0–15	Venezuela	F/4	ASPAC B	1:23	105	Boxscore
Jul 26, 2019	14:00	Australia	0–10	United States	F/5	ASPAC B	1:23	280	Boxscore
Jul 26, 2019	14:00	Mexico	0–7	South Korea	F/6	ASPAC Youth	2:01	370	Boxscore
Jul 27, 2019	10:00	South Korea	13–0	Australia	F/5	ASPAC Youth	1:55	355	Boxscore
Jul 27, 2019	14:00	Venezuela	7–6	United States	F/6	ASPAC B	2:12	350	Boxscore
Jul 27, 2019	14:00	Italy	0–1	Mexico	F/6	Shan-Hwa	1:27	250	Boxscore
Jul 28, 2019	10:00	Venezuela	6–10	Mexico	F/6	ASPAC Youth	1:48	362	Boxscore
Jul 28, 2019	14:00	Australia	4–6	Italy	F/6	Shan-Hwa	2:02	270	Boxscore
Jul 29, 2019	10:00	Mexico	21–2	Australia	F/4	ASPAC B	1:36	150	Boxscore
Jul 29, 2019	14:00	Italy	1–28	United States	F/4	ASPAC B	2:11	150	Boxscore
Jul 29, 2019	14:00	Venezuela	5–6	South Korea	F/6	ASPAC Youth	1:43	423	Boxscore
Jul 30, 2019	10:00	Australia	0–13	Venezuela	F/5	ASPAC B	1:26	137	Boxscore
Jul 30, 2019	10:00	South Korea	11–0	Italy	F/5	ASPAC Youth	1:37	200	Boxscore
Jul 30, 2019	14:00	United States	1–2	Mexico	F/6	ASPAC B	1:35	312	Boxscore
Jul 31, 2019	10:00	United States	12–11	South Korea	F/7	ASPAC Youth	2:45	220	Boxscore

== Second round ==
=== Super round ===
Pos	Team	Pld	W	L	RF	RA	PCT	GB	Qualification
1	Japan	5	4	1	28	20	.800 (Note: Head-to-head result: Japan 7–4 Chinese Taipei)	—	Advance to gold-medal game
2	Chinese Taipei (H)	5	4	1	42	19	.800	—	Advance to gold-medal game
3	Cuba	5	3	2	32	26	.600	1	Advance to bronze-medal game
4	South Korea	5	2	3	31	32	.400 (Note: Head-to-head result: Mexico 0–7 South Korea)	2	Advance to bronze-medal game
5	Mexico	5	2	3	19	37	.400	2	
6	Venezuela	5	0	5	26	44	.000	4	

Source: WBSC
(H) Hosts
Notes:

Date	Local time	Road team	Score	Home team	Inn.	Venue	Game duration	Attendance	Boxscore
Aug 01, 2019	10:00	Venezuela	1–4	Japan	F/6	ASPAC Youth	1:54	250	Boxscore
Aug 01, 2019	14:00	Cuba	10–0	Mexico	F/6	ASPAC Youth	2:10	210	Boxscore
Aug 01, 2019	18:30	Chinese Taipei	9–3	South Korea	F/6	ASPAC Youth	2:26	1913	Boxscore
Aug 02, 2019	10:00	Venezuela	4–5	Cuba	F/6	ASPAC Youth	1:43	249	Boxscore
Aug 02, 2019	14:00	South Korea	7–8	Japan	F/7	ASPAC Youth	2:24	400	Boxscore
Aug 02, 2019	18:30	Mexico	1–11	Chinese Taipei	F/5	ASPAC Youth	1:44	915	Boxscore
Aug 03, 2019	10:00	Cuba	10–8	South Korea	F/6	ASPAC Youth	2:27	320	Boxscore
Aug 03, 2019	14:00	Mexico	8–3	Japan	F/6	ASPAC Youth	1:47	1,450	Boxscore
Aug 03, 2019	18:30	Venezuela	6–14	Chinese Taipei	F/6	ASPAC Youth	2:25	2,738	Boxscore

=== Consolation round ===
Pos	Team	Pld	W	L	RF	RA	PCT	GB
1	United States	5	5	0	99	1	1.000	—
2	Czech Republic	5	4	1	68	23	.800	1
3	Italy	5	3	2	44	41	.600	2
4	Australia	5	2	3	43	29	.400	3
5	South Africa	5	1	4	36	68	.200	4
6	Fiji	5	0	5	4	132	.000	5

Source: WBSC

Date	Local time	Road team	Score	Home team	Inn.	Venue	Game duration	Attendance	Boxscore
Aug 01, 2019	10:00	Australia	7–4	South Africa	F/6	ASPAC B	2:10	243	Boxscore
Aug 01, 2019	14:00	Italy	1–8	Czech Republic	F/6	ASPAC B	1:55	120	Boxscore
Aug 01, 2019	14:00	Fiji	0–28	United States	F/4	Shan-Hwa	1:12	-	Boxscore
Aug 02, 2019	10:00	Italy	10–0	South Africa	F/5	ASPAC B	1:32	105	Boxscore
Aug 02, 2019	14:00	United States	15–0	Czech Republic	F/4	ASPAC B	1:17	210	Boxscore
Aug 02, 2019	14:00	Australia	15–0	Fiji	F/4	Shan-Hwa	1:11	100	Boxscore
Aug 03, 2019	10:00	Fiji	1–16	Italy	F/4	Shan-Hwa	1:25	98	Boxscore
Aug 03, 2019	14:00	South Africa	0–18	United States	F/4	ASPAC B	1:08	225	Boxscore
Aug 03, 2019	14:00	Australia	2–9	Czech Republic	F/6	ASPAC B	2:05	150	Boxscore

== Medal Rounds ==
Both the Gold and Bronze medal game were played at ASPAC Youth Stadium in Tainan.

=== Bronze-medal game ===
Sunday, August 4th 14:00	Cuba	2-1	South Korea	ASPAC Youth Stadium; Attendance: 250

=== Gold-medal game ===
Sunday, August 4th 18:30	Chinese Taipei	4-0	Japan	ASPAC Youth Stadium; Attendance: 8123

== See also ==
- List of sporting events in Taiwan
