= U-12 Baseball World Cup =

Under 12's championship

- Most recent season or competition: 2025 U-12 Baseball World Cup
- Formerly: 12U Baseball World Championship (2011)
- Sport: Baseball
- Founded: 2011
- No. of teams: 14
- Continent: International
- Most recent champion: United States (2025)
- Most titles: United States (6 titles)
- Website: WBSC.org

The U-12 Baseball World Cup is the under-12 baseball world championship sanctioned by the World Baseball Softball Confederation (WBSC) and its predecessor the International Baseball Federation (IBAF), and is the most elite and highest level of competition in its age category. The U-12 Baseball World Championship is scheduled to be held every two years and launched in 2011 in Taipei, Taiwan as the "12U Baseball World Championship".

Unlike other youth international competitions like the Little League World Series, which involve local clubs, the U-12 Baseball World Cup is the only global event across baseball—and all of sport—to feature national teams in this age group (11 to 12 years-old).

The U-12 Baseball World Cup is played under the IBAF's International Rules. Dimensions of regulation U-12 Baseball World Cup ballparks (distance to the outfield fence, pitching mound, base paths, etc.) are significantly increased compared to local youth leagues, due to the superior nature and strength of the players involved.

Because the U-12 Baseball World Cup is considered a "world championship" event, the results of the tournaments affect the WBSC World Rankings.

The inaugural tournament took place in July 2011 and was won by its host Chinese Taipei. The tournament was slated to include 13 national teams and crowned the first ever world champion. Through this tournament, the WBSC looked to assume a leadership position for this age bracket in conjunction with major youth baseball organizations to further develop and promote baseball across the world. The tournament was hosted in Taipei City, one of the prominent tournament venues for international baseball competitions.

== Results ==
Ed.	Years	Hosts	Finalists			Semi-finalists			Teams
Ed.	Years	Hosts	Champions	Score	Runners-up	3rd place	Score	4th place	Teams
1	2011; Details	(Taiwan); Taipei	Chinese Taipei	3 – 2	Cuba	Venezuela	12 – 4	Mexico	13
2	2013; Details	(Taiwan); Taipei	United States	8 – 1	Chinese Taipei	Japan	8 – 2	Venezuela	14
3	2015; Details	(Taiwan); Tainan	United States	7 – 2	Chinese Taipei	Nicaragua	2 – 0	Cuba	12
4	2017; Details	(Taiwan); Tainan	United States	7 – 2	Chinese Taipei	Mexico	1 – 0	Japan	12
5	2019; Details	(Taiwan); Tainan	Chinese Taipei	4 – 0	Japan	Cuba	2 – 1	South Korea	12
6	2022^{2} Details	(Taiwan); Tainan	United States	10 – 2	Venezuela	Chinese Taipei	9 – 5	Dominican Republic	11
7	2023; Details	(Taiwan); Tainan	United States	10 – 4	Chinese Taipei	Venezuela	9 – 8	Japan	12
8	2025; Details	(Taiwan); Tainan	United States	7 – 1	Japan	South Korea	2 – 0	Chinese Taipei	12
9	2027	(Taiwan); Tainan							
10	2029								

^{2} Originally scheduled to be held in 2021, but due to the COVID-19 pandemic, postponed to summer 2022.

== Medal table ==
Rank	Nation	Gold	Silver	Bronze	Total
1	United States	6	0	0	6
2	Chinese Taipei	2	4	1	7
3	Japan	0	2	1	3
4	Venezuela	0	1	2	3
5	Cuba	0	1	1	2
6	Mexico	0	0	1	1
6	Nicaragua	0	0	1	1
6	South Korea	0	0	1	1
Totals (8 entries)		8	8	8	24

== Participating nations ==
Host country

Nation	2011	2013	2015	2017	2019	2021	2023	2025	Total
Australia			10th	10th	10th		11th	9th	5
Brazil	6th	8th	9th	9th					4
Chinese Taipei	1st	2nd	2nd	2nd	1st	3rd	2nd	4th	8
Cuba	2nd		4th		3rd			7	4
Czech Republic		11th		8th	8th	9th	10th	10th	6
Dominican Republic						4th	6th	5th	3
Ecuador	10th								1
Fiji					12th				1
France			11th						1
Germany				12th			9th	11th	3
Hong Kong	11th	12th							2
Indonesia	12th								1
Italy	8th	9th			9th	10th			4
Japan	5th	3rd	6th	4th	2nd	7th	4th	2nd	8
Lithuania	13th								1
Mexico	4th	7th	7th	3rd	5th	6th	7th	6th	8
New Zealand							12th		1
Nicaragua			3rd	6th					2
Pakistan		14th							1
Panama		5th		7th		8th	8th	8th	5
Philippines	9th	13th							2
South Africa				11th	11th	11th		12th	4
Russia		10th	12th						2
South Korea	7th	6th	8th	5th	4th	5th	5th	3rd	8
United States		1st	1st	1st	7th	1st	1st	1st	7
Venezuela	3rd	4th	5th		6th	2nd	3rd		6
Nations	13	14	12	12	12	11	12	12	

== See also ==
- Baseball awards#World
- Little League World Series, an annual U12-baseball tournament held in Williamsport, Pennsylvania with some level of international participation (8 USA Divisions, 8 International Divisions).
- List of sporting events in Taiwan
- U-12 Softball World Cup
