= 2025 Men's Softball World Cup =

International softball tournament

Tournament details
- Host countries: Canada; Mexico; United States
- Dates: Group stage: 12 June – 21 September 2024; Finals: 8–13 July 2025
- Teams: Group stage: 18; Finals: 8
- Venues: 4 (in 3 host cities)
- Defending champions: Australia

Final positions
- Champions: Venezuela (1st title)
- Runner-up: New Zealand
- Third place: United States

Tournament statistics
- Games played: 15
- Attendance: 6,794 (453 per game)
- Most homeruns hit: (Australia) Hayden Matthews (Czech Republic) Tomáš Klein (Mexico) Christian del Valle Enriquez (2 homeruns each)
- Last updated on 15 June 2024

The 2025 WBSC Men's Softball World Cup was the 18th Men's Softball World Cup, an international softball tournament. The group stage took place from 12 June–21 September 2024 in Prince Albert, Canada; Sonora, Mexico; and Oklahoma City, United States. The finals took place from 8–13 July 2025 in Prince Albert, Canada. Canada last hosted the tournament in 2017, while the United States last hosted it in 1996. Mexico haven't hosted the tournament since the inaugural edition in 1966.

Australia are the defending champions after defeating Canada 5–2 in the 2022 final to claim their second World Cup.

== Qualified teams ==
Team	World ranking	Date qualified	Method of qualification
Canada	3rd	10 January 2023	Hosts
Japan	2nd	26 June 2023	2023 Men's Softball Asia Cup winners
Singapore	11th	27 June 2023	2023 Men's Softball Asia Cup runners-up
Philippines	14th	28 June 2023	2023 Men's Softball Asia Cup third place
Czechia	5th	28 July 2023	2023 Men's Softball European Championship winners
~~Denmark~~ (Note: Denmark withdrew from the tournament on 13 February 2024, stating financial reasons and late scheduling.)	~~13th~~	28 July 2023	Men's Softball European Championship runners-up
Netherlands	17th	29 July 2023	Men's Softball European Championship third place
United States	6th	19 October 2023	Hosts
Australia	1st	10 November 2023	2023 Men's Softball Oceania Championship winner
New Zealand	8th	10 November 2023	2023 Men's Softball Oceania Championship runners-up
Mexico	9th	30 January 2024	Hosts
Hong Kong, China	24th	22 February 2024	Wildcard
South Africa	16th	3 March 2024	2023 Men's Softball African Championship Winner
~~Botswana~~	~~33th~~	3 March 2024	2023 Men's Softball African Championship runners-up
Argentina	4th	14 April 2024	2023 Men's Softball Pan American Championship Winner
Venezuela	7th	14 April 2024	2024 Men's Softball Pan American Championship runners-up
Dominican Republic	20th	14 April 2024	2024 Men's Softball Pan American Championship third place
Guatemala	12th	14 April 2024	2024 Men's Softball Pan American Championship fourth place
Colombia	19th	14 April 2024	2024 Men's Softball Pan American Championship fifth place
Israel	15th	24 April 2024	Wildcard

== Officials ==
31 umpires were selected by the WBSC for the tournament.

Umpires
Confederation	Umpires
WBSC Asia	Mitsunori Kusamoto (Japan)
WBSC Americas
WBSC Americas	Darryl Helmer (Canada)
WBSC Americas	Genevieve Gaudreau (Canada)
WBSC Americas	Frankie Billingsley (Canada)
WBSC Americas	Scott McLaren (Canada)
WBSC Americas	Trevor Topping (Canada)
WBSC Americas	Juan Felipe Arteaga (Colombia)
WBSC Americas	Reinaldo Mora (Cuba)
WBSC Americas	Edward Ortiz (Dominican Republic)
WBSC Americas	William Lopez (Guatemala)
WBSC Americas	Abel Chapa (Mexico)
WBSC Americas	Eliazim Raúl Salazar Leal (Mexico)
WBSC Americas	Renzo Ruiz Salzido (Mexico)
WBSC Americas	Edwin Ortiz (Puerto Rico)
WBSC Americas	Mark Korrass (United States)
WBSC Americas	Glenn Brown (United States)
WBSC Americas	Bubba Ewald III (United States)
WBSC Americas	Casy Waite (United States)
WBSC Americas	Johnathan Hand (United States)
WBSC Americas	Trevor Richard Murphy (United States)
WBSC Americas	Jamie Hora (United States)
WBSC Americas	Kevin Lawrence Wallace (United States)
WBSC Americas	Michael James Morrissey (United States)
WBSC Americas	Mike Burwell (United States)
WBSC Europe	Jens Jakobsen (Denmark)
WBSC Europe	Thomas Lohnert (Germany)
WBSC Europe	Mariana Prins (Netherlands)
WBSC Europe	Patrick Reus (Netherlands)
WBSC Oceania	Andrew McManus (New Zealand)
WBSC Oceania	David Fortin (New Zealand)

== Venues ==
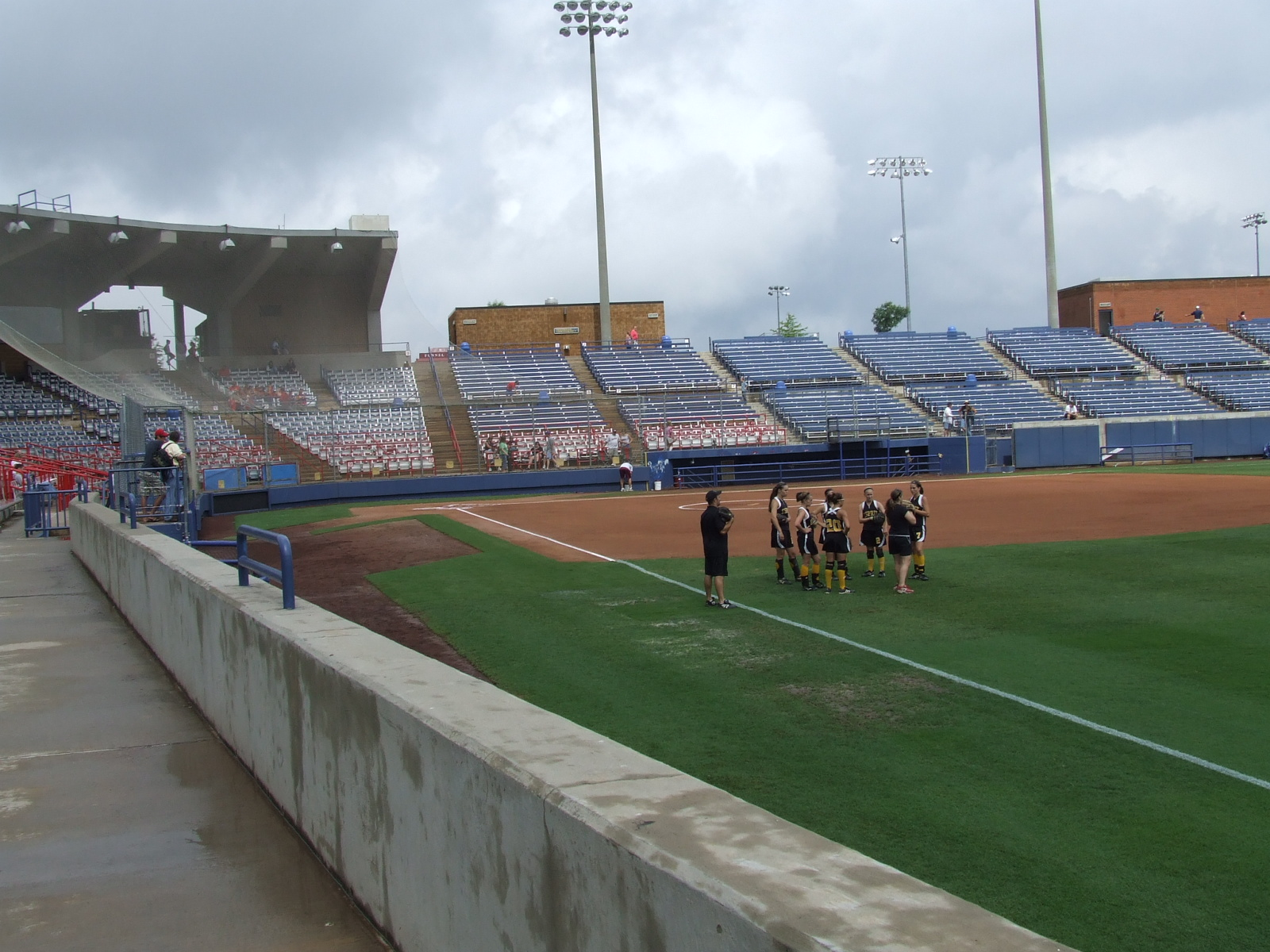
USA Softball Hall of Fame Complex

Group A was hosted by Estadio Mundialistas Hermosillenses and Estadio Fernando M. Ortiz both in Sonora. Prime Ministers’ Park in Prince Albert hosted Group B and the finals across two fields. USA Softball Hall of Fame Complex in Oklahoma City hosted Group C.

Group A		Group B & Finals	Group C
Hermosillo, Mexico		Prince Albert, Canada	Oklahoma City, United States
Estadio Mundialistas Hermosillenses	Estadio Fernando M. Ortiz	Prime Ministers’ Park	USA Softball Hall of Fame Complex
2025 Men's Softball World Cup is located in Mexico		2025 Men's Softball World Cup is located in Canada	2025 Men's Softball World Cup is located in the United States

== Group stage ==
=== Group A ===
Group A was contested in Hermosillo during 12–16 June 2024.

Pos	Team	Pld	W	L	RF	RA	RD	PCT	GB	Qualification
1	Venezuela	5	5	0	31	6	+25	1.000	—	Advance to Group A Final
2	Dominican Republic	5	3	2	22	16	+6	.600	2	Advance to Group A Final
3	Australia	5	2	3	18	23	−5	.400 (Note: Head-to-head, TQB: Australia 1-1, 0.267; Mexico 1-1, 0.153; Czechia 1-1, -0.500)	3	Advance to Group A third place play-off
4	Mexico (H)	5	2	3	15	14	+1	.400	3	Advance to Group A third place play-off
5	Czechia	5	2	3	17	39	−22	.400	3	
6	Philippines	5	1	4	13	18	−5	.200	4	

Source: WBSC
Rules for classification: 1) Wins/losses; 2) Head-to-head record; 3) TQB; 4) ER-TQB; 5) Highest batting average; 6) Coin toss
(H) Hosts
Notes:

Date	Local time	Road team	Score	Home team	Inn.	Venue	Game duration	Attendance	Boxscore
12 June 2024	16:00	Venezuela	7–0	Australia	7	Estadio Fernando M. Ortiz	2:05	200	Boxscore
12 June 2024	16:00	Dominican Republic	5–2	Philippines	7	Estadio Mundialistas Hermosillenses	2:04	102	Boxscore
12 June 2024	21:00	Mexico	7–0	Czechia	5	Estadio Fernando M. Ortiz	1:35	1,100	Boxscore
13 June 2024	17:00	Dominican Republic	13–4	Czechia	7	Estadio Fernando M. Ortiz	2:56	245	Boxscore
13 June 2024	18:00	Philippines	4–5	Australia	7	Estadio Mundialistas Hermosillenses	2:12	72	Boxscore
13 June 2024	20:00	Mexico	2–5	Venezuela	7	Estadio Fernando M. Ortiz	2:03	1,560	Boxscore
13 June 2024	21:00	Australia	1–4	Dominican Republic	7	Estadio Mundialistas Hermosillenses	1:55	83	Boxscore
14 June 2024	17:00	Philippines	3–1	Mexico	7	Estadio Fernando M. Ortiz	1:55	600	Boxscore
14 June 2024	18:00	Czechia	2–11	Venezuela	5	Estadio Mundialistas Hermosillenses	1:56	85	Boxscore
14 June 2024	20:00	Australia	6–1	Mexico	8	Estadio Fernando M. Ortiz	2:32	1,200	Boxscore
14 June 2024	21:00	Dominican Republic	0–5	Venezuela	7	Estadio Mundialistas Hermosillenses	2:02	200	Boxscore
15 June 2024	17:00	Czechia	7–6	Australia	7	Estadio Fernando M. Ortiz	2:16	220	Boxscore
15 June 2024	18:00	Venezuela	3–2	Philippines	8	Estadio Mundialistas Hermosillenses	2:29	62	Boxscore
15 June 2024	20:00	Mexico	4–0	Dominican Republic	7	Estadio Fernando M. Ortiz	1:39	800	Boxscore
15 June 2024	21:00	Philippines	2–4	Czechia	7	Estadio Mundialistas Hermosillenses	2:07	265	Boxscore

Final
16 June – Estadio Fernando M. Ortiz
Dominican Republic	2
Venezuela	0
Third place play-off
16 June – Estadio Fernando M. Ortiz
Mexico	1
Australia	4

Repechage
16 June – Estadio Fernando M. Ortiz
Australia	4
Venezuela	1

Round	Date	Local Time	Road team	Score	Home team	Inn.	Venue	Game duration	Attendance	Boxscore
5th place match	16 June 2024	20:00	Philippines	2–3	Czechia	8	Estadio Mundialistas Hermosillenses			Boxscore
3rd place match	16 June 2024	17:00	Mexico	1–4	Australia	7	Estadio Fernando M. Ortiz	1:42	854	Boxscore
Final	16 June 2024	17:00	Dominican Republic	2–0	Venezuela	7	Estadio Mundialistas Hermosillenses	2:05	150	Boxscore
Repechage	16 June 2024	21:00	Australia	4–1	Venezuela	7	Estadio Fernando M. Ortiz			Boxscore

=== Group B ===
Group B was contested in Prince Albert during 10–14 July 2024.

Pos	Team	Pld	W	L	RF	RA	RD	PCT	GB	Qualification
1	Argentina	5	5	0	45	1	+44	1.000	—	Advance to Group B Final
2	New Zealand	5	4	1	30	5	+25	.800	1	Advance to Group B Final
3	Canada (H)	5	3	2	22	9	+13	.600	2	Advance to Group B third place play-off
4	Singapore	5	2	3	26	26	0	.400	3	Advance to Group B third place play-off
5	Hong Kong, China	5	1	4	5	46	−41	.200	4	
6	Israel	5	0	5	3	44	−41	.000	5	

Source: WBSC
Rules for classification: 1) Wins/losses; 2) Head-to-head record; 3) TQB; 4) ER-TQB; 5) Highest batting average; 6) Coin toss
(H) Hosts

Date	Local time	Road team	Score	Home team	Inn.	Venue	Game duration	Attendance	Boxscore
10 July 2024	11:00	Argentina	8–0	Israel	5	Prime Ministers’ Park			Boxscore
10 July 2024	16:00	Singapore	0–2	New Zealand	7	Prime Ministers’ Park			Boxscore
10 July 2024	18:00	Hong Kong, China	1–7	Canada	7	Prime Ministers’ Park			Boxscore
11 July 2024	10:00	New Zealand	10–0	Israel	4	Prime Ministers’ Park			Boxscore
11 July 2024	13:00	Israel	2–3	Hong Kong, China	7	Prime Ministers’ Park			Boxscore
11 July 2024	18:00	Canada	7–1	Singapore	7	Prime Ministers’ Park			Boxscore
11 July 2024	21:00	Canada	0–2	Argentina	7	Prime Ministers’ Park			Boxscore
12 July 2024	10:00	Singapore	16–1	Israel	4	Prime Ministers’ Park			Boxscore
12 July 2024	13:00	Singapore	9–1	Hong Kong, China	5	Prime Ministers’ Park			Boxscore
12 July 2024	18:00	Hong Kong, China	0–16	Argentina	3	Prime Ministers’ Park			Boxscore
12 July 2024	21:00	New Zealand	5–1	Canada	7	Prime Ministers’ Park			Boxscore
13 July 2024	10:00	Argentina	15–0	Singapore	3	Prime Ministers’ Park			Boxscore
13 July 2024	13:00	Argentina	4–1	New Zealand	7	Prime Ministers’ Park			Boxscore
13 July 2024	18:00	Hong Kong, China	0–12	New Zealand	4	Prime Ministers’ Park			Boxscore
13 July 2024	21:00	Israel	0–7	Canada	6	Prime Ministers’ Park			Boxscore

Final
14 July – Prime Ministers’ Park
New Zealand	5
Argentina	6
Third place play-off
14 July – Prime Ministers’ Park
Singapore	0
Canada	8

Repechage
14 July – Prime Ministers’ Park
Canada	1
New Zealand	4

Round	Date	Local Time	Road team	Score	Home team	Inn.	Venue	Game duration	Attendance	Boxscore
5th place match	14 July 2024	10:00	Israel	5–6	Hong Kong, China	7	Prime Ministers’ Park			Boxscore
3rd place match	14 July 2024	13:00	Singapore	0–8	Canada	5	Prime Ministers’ Park			Boxscore
Final	14 July 2024	16:00	New Zealand	5–6	Argentina	7	Prime Ministers’ Park			Boxscore
Repechage	14 July 2024	19:00	Canada	1–4	New Zealand	7	Prime Ministers’ Park			Boxscore

=== Group C ===
Group C was contested in Oklahoma City during 17–21 September 2024.

Pos	Team	Pld	W	L	RF	RA	RD	PCT	GB	Qualification
1	United States (H)	5	5	0	41	9	+32	1.000	—	Advance to Group C Final
2	Japan	5	4	1	35	10	+25	.800	1	Advance to Group C Final
3	Guatemala	5	3	2	23	16	+7	.600	2	Advance to Group C third place play-off
4	Colombia	5	2	3	13	20	−7	.400	3	Advance to Group C third place play-off
5	Netherlands	5	1	4	9	41	−32	.200	4	
6	South Africa	5	0	5	8	33	−25	.000	5	

First match(es) will be played: 17 September 2024. Source: WBSC
Rules for classification: 1) Wins/losses; 2) Head-to-head record; 3) TQB; 4) ER-TQB; 5) Highest batting average; 6) Coin toss
(H) Hosts

Date	Local time	Road team	Score	Home team	Inn.	Venue	Game duration	Attendance	Boxscore
17 September 2024	13:00	Guatemala	4–0	South Africa	7	USA Softball Hall of Fame Complex			Boxscore
17 September 2024	16:00	Netherlands	0–9	Japan	6	USA Softball Hall of Fame Complex			Boxscore
17 September 2024	19:00	Colombia	0–3	United States	7	USA Softball Hall of Fame Complex			Boxscore
18 September 2024	10:00	Japan	9–0	South Africa	5	USA Softball Hall of Fame Complex			Boxscore
18 September 2024	13:00	South Africa	0–3	Colombia	7	USA Softball Hall of Fame Complex			Boxscore
18 September 2024	16:00	United States	7–0	Guatemala	5	USA Softball Hall of Fame Complex			Boxscore
18 September 2024	19:00	United States	11–0	Netherlands	5	USA Softball Hall of Fame Complex			Boxscore
19 September 2024	10:00	Colombia	2–9	Guatemala	6	USA Softball Hall of Fame Complex			Boxscore
19 September 2024	13:00	Netherlands	0–7	Colombia	5	USA Softball Hall of Fame Complex			Boxscore
19 September 2024	16:00	South Africa	4–6	Netherlands	7	USA Softball Hall of Fame Complex			Boxscore
19 September 2024	19:00	Japan	5–9	United States	7	USA Softball Hall of Fame Complex			Boxscore
20 September 2024	10:00	Netherlands	3–10	Guatemala	4	USA Softball Hall of Fame Complex			Boxscore
20 September 2024	13:00	Guatemala	0–4	Japan	7	USA Softball Hall of Fame Complex			Boxscore
20 September 2024	16:00	Colombia	1–8	Japan	7	USA Softball Hall of Fame Complex			Boxscore
20 September 2024	19:00	South Africa	4–11	United States	6	USA Softball Hall of Fame Complex			Boxscore

Final
21 September – USA Softball Hall of Fame Complex
Japan	0
United States	10
Third place play-off
21 September – USA Softball Hall of Fame Complex
Colombia	2
Guatemala	3

Repechage
21 September – USA Softball Hall of Fame Complex
Guatemala	0
Japan	3

Round	Date	Local Time	Road team	Score	Home team	Inn.	Venue	Game duration	Attendance	Boxscore
5th place match	21 September 2024	10:00	South Africa	8–4	Netherlands	7	USA Softball Hall of Fame Complex			Boxscore
3rd place match	21 September 2024	13:00	Colombia	2–3	Guatemala	7	USA Softball Hall of Fame Complex			Boxscore
Final	21 September 2024	16:00	Japan	0–10	United States	4	USA Softball Hall of Fame Complex			Boxscore
Repechage	21 September 2024	19:00	Guatemala	0–3	Japan	7	USA Softball Hall of Fame Complex			Boxscore

=== Finals rankings ===
The ranking of the wildcard spots for the finals stage are as follows.

- 1) Hosts
- 2)Top third-place team(s) in the Group Stage, based on final standings from the previous edition of the World Cup
- 3)Top third-place team(s) in the Group Stage based on the highest position in the WBSC Rankings at the end of the previous calendar year.

Rank	Team	Previous WC	Ranking	Qualification
1	Canada (H)	2	4	Qualified as hosts
2	Venezuela	6	5	Qualified from previous World Cup ranking
3	Mexico	11	9	

Canada qualified for the finals as host of that stage, while Venezuela qualified as the first placed team with the next best finish at the previous World Cup.

== Finals ==
=== Group A ===
Pos	Team	Pld	W	L	RF	RA	RD	PCT	GB	Qualification
1	Venezuela	3	2	1	17	13	+4	.667 (Note: Head to head results: Venezuela 7–2 New Zealand.)	—	Advance to Super Round
2	New Zealand	3	2	1	14	11	+3	.667	—	Advance to Super Round
3	Argentina	3	1	2	8	8	0	.333 (Note: Head to head results: Argentina 7–3 Canada.)	1	Advance to Placement Round
4	Canada (H)	3	1	2	17	24	−7	.333	1	Advance to Placement Round

Source: WBSC
Rules for classification: 1) Wins/losses; 2) Head to head; 3) Head to head runs against; 4) Runs against; 5) Head to head
(H) Hosts
Notes:

Date	Local time	Road team	Score	Home team	Inn.	Venue	Game duration	Attendance	Boxscore
8 July 2025	14:30	Venezuela	1–0	Argentina	7	Prime Ministers’ Park	1:55	833	Boxscore
8 July 2025	20:30	New Zealand	8–3	Canada	7	Prime Ministers’ Park	2:44	2,000	Boxscore
9 July 2025	17:30	Canada	11–9	Venezuela	7	Prime Ministers’ Park	3:05	1,000	Boxscore
9 July 2025	20:30	New Zealand	4–1	Argentina	7	Prime Ministers’ Park	2:22	2,000	Boxscore
10 July 2025	14:30	Venezuela	7–2	New Zealand	7	Prime Ministers’ Park	2:11	800	Boxscore
10 July 2025	21:30	Argentina	7–3	Canada	7	Prime Ministers’ Park	2:27	1,200	Boxscore

=== Group B ===
Pos	Team	Pld	W	L	RF	RA	RD	PCT	GB	Qualification
1	Japan	3	2	1	18	9	+9	.667	—	Advance to Super Round
2	United States	3	2	1	25	6	+19	.667	—	Advance to Super Round
3	Australia	3	1	2	11	23	−12	.333	1	Advance to Placement Round
4	Dominican Republic	3	1	2	6	22	−16	.333	1	Advance to Placement Round

First match(es) will be played: 8 July 2025. Source: WBSC
Rules for classification: 1) Wins/losses; 2) Head to head; 3) Head to head runs against; 4) Runs against; 5) Head to head

Date	Local time	Road team	Score	Home team	Inn.	Venue	Game duration	Attendance	Boxscore
8 July 2025	12:30	Japan	2–3	Dominican Republic	7	Prime Ministers’ Park			Boxscore
8 July 2025	17:30	United States	10–0	Australia	7	Prime Ministers’ Park			Boxscore
9 July 2025	12:30	Dominican Republic	2–9	Australia	6	Prime Ministers’ Park			Boxscore
9 July 2025	15:30	United States	4–5	Japan	7	Prime Ministers’ Park			Boxscore
10 July 2025	12:30	Dominican Republic	1–11	United States	4	Prime Ministers’ Park			Boxscore
10 July 2025	18:30	Australia	2–11	Japan	5	Prime Ministers’ Park			Boxscore

=== Placement Round ===
Pos	Team	Pld	W	L	RF	RA	RD	PCT	GB
1	Canada	3	2	1	21	12	+9	.667	—
2	Argentina	3	2	1	23	16	+7	.667	—
3	Australia	3	2	1	18	21	−3	.667	—
4	Dominican Republic	3	0	3	11	24	−13	.000	2

First match(es) will be played: 11 July 2025. Source: WBSC
Rules for classification: 1) Wins/losses; 2) Head to head; 3) Head to head runs against; 4) Runs against; 5) Head to head

Date	Local time	Road team	Score	Home team	Inn.	Venue	Game duration	Attendance	Boxscore
11 July 2025	12:30	Australia	7–5	Argentina	7	Prime Ministers’ Park			Boxscore
11 July 2025	18:30	Dominican Republic	3–4	Canada	7	Prime Ministers’ Park			Boxscore
12 July 2025	12:30	Dominican Republic	6–11	Argentina	7	Prime Ministers’ Park			Boxscore
12 July 2025	15:30	Canada	14–2	Australia	4	Prime Ministers’ Park			Boxscore

=== Super Round ===
Pos	Team	Pld	W	L	RF	RA	RD	PCT	GB	Qualification
1	Venezuela	3	2	1	14	11	+3	.667	—	Advance to Final
2	New Zealand	3	2	1	15	14	+1	.667	—	Advance to Final
3	Japan	3	2	1	13	13	0	.667	—	Advance to Third place play-off
4	United States	3	0	3	12	16	−4	.000	2	Advance to Third place play-off

First match(es) will be played: 11 July 2025. Source: WBSC
Rules for classification: 1) Wins/losses; 2) Head to head; 3) Head to head runs against; 4) Runs against; 5) Head to head

Date	Local time	Road team	Score	Home team	Inn.	Venue	Game duration	Attendance	Boxscore
11 July 2025	14:30	United States	4–5	New Zealand	7	Prime Ministers’ Park	1:57	700	Boxscore
11 July 2025	20:30	Venezuela	1–5	Japan	7	Prime Ministers’ Park	1:57	400	Boxscore
12 July 2025	17:30	United States	4–6	Venezuela	7	Prime Ministers’ Park	1:53	1400	Boxscore
12 July 2025	20:30	New Zealand	8–3	Japan	7	Prime Ministers’ Park	2:39	1000	Boxscore

=== Third place play-off ===
13 July 2025 11:00 Prime Ministers’ Park
Team	1	2	3	4	5	6	7	R	H	E
United States	0	0	0	0	4	3	3	10	8	0
Japan	0	0	1	0	0	0	0	1	8	0
WP: Marco Diaz LP: Hiroki Ikeda; Boxscore

=== Final ===
13 July 2025 14:00 Prime Ministers’ Park
Team	1	2	3	4	5	6	7	R	H	E
New Zealand	0	0	0	0	0	0	0	0	3	0
Venezuela	0	0	1	0	0	2	X	3	3	0
WP: Maiker Josue Pimentel SIlva LP: Liam James Potts; Boxscore
