= 2019 Men's Softball World Championship =

Tournament details
- Host country: Czech Republic
- Dates: 13–23 June 2019
- Teams: 16

Final positions
- Champions: Argentina (1st title)
- Runner-up: Japan
- Third place: Canada
- Fourth place: New Zealand

The 2019 WBSC Men's Softball World Championship is an international softball tournament taking place in Prague and Havlíčkův Brod, Czech Republic from 13–23 June 2019. It will be the 16th edition of the tournament. This marks the first time the World Championship was held in Europe.

New Zealand is the defending champion.

== Pools composition ==
Pool A
| Argentina | Botswana | Cuba | Czech Republic | Japan | Mexico | New Zealand | Philippines |
Pool B
| Australia | Canada | Denmark | Netherlands | Singapore | South Africa | United States | Venezuela |

== Preliminary round ==
=== Pool A ===
| Rk | Team | W | L | PCT | RS | RA | RDIFF |
|---|---|---|---|---|---|---|---|
| 1 | Japan | 7 | 0 | 1.000 | 34 | 9 | 25 |
| 2 | Argentina | 6 | 1 | .857 | 53 | 18 | 35 |
| 3 | New Zealand | 4 | 3 | .571 | 42 | 16 | 26 |
| 4 | Czech Republic | 3 | 4 | .429 | 20 | 30 | -10 |
| 5 | Cuba | 3 | 4 | .429 | 30 | 16 | 14 |
| 6 | Mexico | 3 | 4 | .429 | 28 | 32 | -4 |
| 7 | Botswana | 2 | 5 | .286 | 10 | 31 | -21 |
| 8 | Philippines | 0 | 7 | .000 | 5 | 70 | -65 |

Note: MEX - CZE 2:3; CUB - CZE 4:5; MEX - CUB 2:7

=== Pool B ===
| Rk | Team | W | L | PCT | RS | RA | RDIF |
|---|---|---|---|---|---|---|---|
| 1 | Canada | 7 | 0 | 1.000 | 47 | 7 | 40 |
| 2 | Australia | 6 | 1 | .857 | 40 | 13 | 27 |
| 3 | United States | 5 | 2 | .714 | 40 | 17 | 23 |
| 4 | Venezuela | 4 | 3 | .571 | 29 | 15 | 14 |
| 5 | Denmark | 3 | 4 | .429 | 27 | 29 | -2 |
| 6 | South Africa | 1 | 6 | .143 | 15 | 41 | -26 |
| 7 | Netherlands | 1 | 6 | .143 | 21 | 48 | -27 |
| 8 | Singapore | 1 | 6 | .143 | 7 | 56 | -49 |

Note: RSA - SGP 3:4; SGP - NED 0:13; RSA - NED 7:0

== Play-offs ==
Quarter-finals
June 21 10:30
Japan | 6
Venezuela | 0
June 21 16:30
Australia | 4
New Zealand | 7
June 21 13:30
Argentina | 9
United States | 0
June 21 19:30
Czech Republic | 0
Canada | 4

Semi-finals
June 22 16:30
Japan | 2
New Zealand | 1
June 22 19:30
Argentina | 7
Canada | 0

Final
June 23 19:30
Argentina | 3
Japan | 2
3rd Place
June 23 16:30
New Zealand | 1
Canada | 2

== Placement Round 5th–8th place ==
Placement round
June 22 10:30
Venezuela | 7
Czech Republic | 0
June 22 13:30
United States | 8
Australia | 6

5th Place
June 23 13:30
Venezuela | 4
United States | 5
7th Place
June 23 10:30
Czech Republic | 1
Australia | 2

== Placement Round 9th–16th place ==
| 9th Place |
| Denmark | 3 |
| Cuba | 0 |

| 11th Place |
| Mexico | 7 |
| South Africa | 0 |

| 13th Place |
| Botswana | 5 |
| Netherlands | 6 |

| 15th Place |
| Philippines | 3 |
| Singapore | 4 |

== Final standings ==
| Rk | Team | W | L |
|---|---|---|---|
| 1 | Argentina | 9 | 1 |
| 2 | Japan | 9 | 1 |
| 3 | Canada | 9 | 1 |
| 4 | New Zealand | 5 | 5 |
| 5 | United States | 7 | 3 |
| 6 | Venezuela | 5 | 5 |
| 7 | Australia | 7 | 3 |
| 8 | Czech Republic | 3 | 7 |
Failed to qualify for Playoffs
| 9 | Denmark | 4 | 4 |
| 10 | Cuba | 3 | 5 |
| 11 | Mexico | 4 | 4 |
| 12 | South Africa | 1 | 7 |
| 13 | Netherlands | 2 | 6 |
| 14 | Botswana | 2 | 6 |
| 15 | Singapore | 2 | 6 |
| 16 | Philippines | 0 | 8 |
