= 2013 Men's Softball World Championship =

Tournament details
- Host country: New Zealand
- Dates: 1 – 10 March
- Teams: 16
- Defending champions: Australia

Final positions
- Champions: New Zealand
- Runner-up: Venezuela
- Third place: Australia
- Fourth place: Argentina

The 2013 ISF Men's World Championship, also known as the 2013 ISF Tradestaff Men's World Championship for sponsorship reasons, was an international softball tournament. The tournament was held at Rosedale Park in Auckland, New Zealand from 1–10 March 2013. It was the 13th time the World Championship took place. Sixteen nations competed, including defending champions Australia.

In the end, New Zealand won over Venezuela. Defending champions, Australia finished third.

== Final standings ==
Rk	Team	W	L
1	New Zealand	9	1
2	Venezuela	7	5
3	Australia	9	2
4	Argentina	7	3
5	Canada	6	3
6	Japan	6	3
7	Samoa	4	4
8	United States	4	4
Failed to qualify for Playoffs
9	Great Britain	3	4
10	Colombia	3	4
11	Czech Republic	3	4
12	South Africa	2	5
13	Mexico	2	5
14	Netherlands	1	6
15	Philippines	0	7
16	Indonesia	0	7
