= 2017 Men's Softball World Championship =

Championnat du monde de softball masculin 2017 de la WBSC

Tournament details
- Host country: Canada
- Dates: 7–16 July 2017
- Teams: 16
- Defending champions: Canada

Final positions
- Champions: New Zealand (7th title)
- Runner-up: Australia
- Third place: Canada
- Fourth place: Argentina

The 2017 ISF Men's World Championship is an international softball tournament that took place in Whitehorse, Canada from 7–16 July 2017. It was the 15th time the World Championship took place and the first time Whitehorse hosted the tournament.

== Pools composition ==
Pool A
| Argentina | Australia | Canada | Dominican Republic | India | Hong Kong | South Africa | United States |
Pool B
| Botswana | Czech Republic | Denmark | Great Britain | Japan | New Zealand | Turkey | Venezuela |

== Officials ==
The ISF appointed 21 umpires from 12 national countries to facilitate matches of the tournament. Bob Stanton from Canada is named Umpire in Chief, and Wayne Saunders and Brian Van Os, both from Canada, were named assistant Umpire in Chiefs.

- Leigh Evans (Australia)
- Jason Carter (Australia)
- Abel Mataboge (Botswana)
- Gary Skjerven (Canada)
- Peter Kluszczynski (Canada)
- Daryl Helmer (Canada)
- Mike Morrissey (Canada)
- Enrique Ramirez (Cuba)
- Vladimir Liss (Czech Republic)
- Jiri Dostal (Czech Republic)
- Galip Sönmez (Germany)
- Nobuhiro Endo (Japan)
- Toyomatsu Tabinuki (Japan)
- Mark Porteous (New Zealand)
- Tony Kaiaruna (New Zealand)
- William Lopez (Puerto Rico)
- Ashley Mmakola (South Africa)
- Randy McLamb (United States)
- Brian Sonak (United States)
- Casey Waite (United States)
- Carlos Falcon (Venezuela)

== Preliminary round ==
=== Pool A ===
| Pos | Team | Pld | W | L | RF | RA | RD | PCT | GB | Qualification |
|---|---|---|---|---|---|---|---|---|---|---|
| 1 | Canada (H) | 7 | 7 | 0 | 66 | 11 | +55 | 1.000 | — | Advance to Championship Round |
| 2 | Australia | 7 | 5 | 2 | 49 | 13 | +36 | .714 | 2 | Advance to Championship Round |
| 3 | Argentina | 7 | 5 | 2 | 45 | 25 | +20 | .714 | 2 | Advance to Championship Round |
| 4 | United States | 7 | 5 | 2 | 47 | 18 | +29 | .714 | 2 | Advance to Championship Round |
| 5 | Dominican Republic | 7 | 3 | 4 | 53 | 38 | +15 | .429 | 4 | Advance to Placement round |
| 6 | South Africa | 7 | 2 | 5 | 28 | 37 | −9 | .286 | 5 | Advance to Placement round |
| 7 | Hong Kong | 7 | 1 | 6 | 3 | 80 | −77 | .143 | 6 | Advance to Placement round |
| 8 | India | 7 | 0 | 7 | 3 | 72 | −69 | .000 | 7 | Advance to Placement round |

Source: WBSC
(H) Hosts

| Date | Local time | Road team | Score | Home team | Inn. | Venue | Game duration | Attendance | Boxscore |
|---|---|---|---|---|---|---|---|---|---|
| July 7, 2017 | 11:00 | Hong Kong | 0–21 | Dominican Republic | 3 | Pepsi Softball Centre | 1:05 | 110 | Boxscore |
| July 7, 2017 | 13:00 | Australia | 16–0 | India | 4 | Pepsi Softball Centre | 1:10 | 85 | Boxscore |
| July 7, 2017 | 19:30 | Canada | 10–2 | South Africa | 7 | Pepsi Softball Centre | 1:51 | 300 | Boxscore |
| July 7, 2017 | 19:30 | United States | 1–5 | Argentina | 7 | Pepsi Softball Centre | 1:50 | 325 | Boxscore |
| July 8, 2017 | 10:00 | India | 1–2 | Hong Kong | 7 | Pepsi Softball Centre | 1:40 | 103 | Boxscore |
| July 8, 2017 | 12:30 | South Africa | 6–8 | Dominican Republic | 7 | Pepsi Softball Centre | 2:15 | 285 | Boxscore |
| July 8, 2017 | 16:30 | Australia | 1–2 | United States | 7 | Pepsi Softball Centre | 1:30 | 500 | Boxscore |
| July 8, 2017 | 19:00 | Canada | 8–3 | Argentina | 7 | Pepsi Softball Centre | 1:58 | 723 | Boxscore |
| July 9, 2017 | 11:30 | Dominican Republic | 15–0 | India | 4 | Pepsi Softball Centre | 1:15 | 50 | Boxscore |
| July 9, 2017 | 12:30 | Hong Kong | 0–8 | Argentina | 5 | Pepsi Softball Centre | 1:00 | 53 | Boxscore |
| July 9, 2017 | 15:00 | Australia | 7–0 | South Africa | 5 | Pepsi Softball Centre | 1:16 | 168 | Boxscore |
| July 9, 2017 | 19:00 | United States | 1–7 | Canada | 7 | Pepsi Softball Centre | 2:12 | 800 | Boxscore |
| July 10, 2017 | 11:30 | United States | 11–0 | India | 4 | Pepsi Softball Centre | 1:07 | 40 | Boxscore |
| July 10, 2017 | 14:00 | Argentina | 6–1 | South Africa | 7 | Pepsi Softball Centre | 2:00 | 40 | Boxscore |
| July 10, 2017 | 16:30 | Canada | 14–1 | Hong Kong | 6 | Pepsi Softball Centre | 1:52 | 200 | Boxscore |
| July 11, 2017 | 9:00 | Dominican Republic | 1–2 | Australia | 7 | Pepsi Softball Centre | 1:37 | 70 | Boxscore |
| July 11, 2017 | 10:00 | Hong Kong | 0–10 | South Africa | 4 | Pepsi Softball Centre | 1:40 | 53 | Boxscore |
| July 11, 2017 | 14:00 | Argentina | 11–0 | India | 7 | Pepsi Softball Centre | 1:25 | 100 | Boxscore |
| July 11, 2017 | 17:30 | Dominican Republic | 2–12 | United States | 4 | Pepsi Softball Centre | 1:30 | 77 | Boxscore |
| July 11, 2017 | 19:00 | Australia | 4–9 | Canada | 7 | Pepsi Softball Centre | 1:56 | 832 | Boxscore |
| July 12, 2017 | 11:30 | United States | 16–0 | Hong Kong | 3 | Pepsi Softball Centre | 0:56 | 50 | Boxscore |
| July 12, 2017 | 12:30 | India | 2–6 | South Africa | 7 | Pepsi Softball Centre | 1:40 | 89 | Boxscore |
| July 12, 2017 | 17:30 | Argentina | 1–9 | Australia | 5 | Pepsi Softball Centre | 1:23 | 444 | Boxscore |
| July 12, 2017 | 19:00 | Dominican Republic | 0–7 | Canada | 5 | Pepsi Softball Centre | 1:25 | 1,822 | Boxscore |
| July 13, 2017 | 12:30 | Australia | 10–0 | Hong Kong | 4 | Pepsi Softball Centre | 0:52 | 127 | Boxscore |
| July 13, 2017 | 15:00 | Canada | 11–0 | India | 4 | Pepsi Softball Centre | 1:08 | 353 | Boxscore |
| July 13, 2017 | 16:30 | South Africa | 3–4 | United States | 8 | Pepsi Softball Centre | 3:30 | 150 | Boxscore |
| July 13, 2017 | 19:00 | Dominican Republic | 6–11 | Argentina | 7 | Pepsi Softball Centre | 2:27 | 200 | Boxscore |

=== Pool B ===
| Pos | Team | Pld | W | L | RF | RA | RD | PCT | GB | Qualification |
|---|---|---|---|---|---|---|---|---|---|---|
| 1 | New Zealand | 7 | 6 | 1 | 73 | 11 | +62 | .857 | — | Advance to Championship Round |
| 2 | Japan | 7 | 6 | 1 | 74 | 9 | +65 | .857 | — | Advance to Championship Round |
| 3 | Venezuela | 7 | 6 | 1 | 78 | 19 | +59 | .857 | — | Advance to Championship Round |
| 4 | Botswana | 7 | 3 | 4 | 24 | 23 | +1 | .429 | 3 | Advance to Championship Round |
| 5 | Czech Republic | 7 | 3 | 4 | 40 | 33 | +7 | .429 | 3 | Advance to Placement round |
| 6 | Denmark | 7 | 3 | 4 | 33 | 28 | +5 | .429 | 3 | Advance to Placement round |
| 7 | Great Britain | 7 | 1 | 6 | 24 | 55 | −31 | .143 | 5 | Advance to Placement round |
| 8 | Turkey | 7 | 0 | 7 | 1 | 169 | −168 | .000 | 6 | Advance to Placement round |

Source: WBSC

| Date | Local time | Road team | Score | Home team | Inn. | Venue | Game duration | Attendance | Boxscore |
|---|---|---|---|---|---|---|---|---|---|
| July 7, 2017 | 9:00 | Botswana | 1–0 | Great Britain | 8 | Pepsi Softball Centre | 1:50 | 107 | |
| July 7, 2017 | 10:30 | Turkey | 0–22 | New Zealand | 3 | Pepsi Softball Centre | 1:15 | 200 | Boxscore |
| July 7, 2017 | 12:30 | Czech Republic | 3–2 | Denmark | 7 | Pepsi Softball Centre | 1:33 | 200 | Boxscore |
| July 7, 2017 | 14:30 | Venezuela | 0–7 | Japan | | Pepsi Softball Centre | | | Forfeit |
| July 8, 2017 | 11:30 | Venezuela | 35–0 | Turkey | 3 | Pepsi Softball Centre | 1:20 | 40 | Boxscore |
| July 8, 2017 | 14:00 | Japan | 8–0 | Botswana | 6 | Pepsi Softball Centre | 1:35 | 150 | Boxscore |
| July 8, 2017 | 15:00 | Great Britain | 0–3 | Denmark | 7 | Pepsi Softball Centre | 1:40 | 200 | Boxscore |
| July 8, 2017 | 17:30 | Czech Republic | 2–9 | New Zealand | 5 | Pepsi Softball Centre | 1:40 | 473 | Boxscore |
| July 9, 2017 | 10:00 | Turkey | 0–24 | Japan | 3 | Pepsi Softball Centre | 1:00 | 75 | Boxscore |
| July 9, 2017 | 14:00 | Denmark | 1–0 | Botswana | 7 | Pepsi Softball Centre | 1:35 | 200 | Boxscore |
| July 9, 2017 | 16:30 | Czech Republic | 5–12 | Venezuela | 5 | Pepsi Softball Centre | 1:16 | 322 | Boxscore |
| July 9, 2017 | 17:30 | New Zealand | 16–0 | Great Britain | 5 | Pepsi Softball Centre | 1:55 | 85 | Boxscore |
| July 10, 2017 | 10:00 | Venezuela | 6–3 | Denmark | 7 | Pepsi Softball Centre | 1:57 | 51 | Boxscore |
| July 10, 2017 | 12:30 | Botswana | 21–0 | Turkey | 3 | Pepsi Softball Centre | 1:02 | 37 | Boxscore |
| July 10, 2017 | 15:00 | Czech Republic | 9–0 | Great Britain | 5 | Pepsi Softball Centre | 1:40 | 21 | Boxscore |
| July 10, 2017 | 17:30 | Japan | 1–8 | New Zealand | 6 | Pepsi Softball Centre | 1:40 | 150 | Boxscore |
| July 11, 2017 | 11:30 | Turkey | 0–23 | Denmark | 3 | Pepsi Softball Centre | 0:55 | 40 | Boxscore |
| July 11, 2017 | 12:30 | Czech Republic | 0–1 | Botswana | 7 | Pepsi Softball Centre | 1:32 | 127 | Boxscore |
| July 11, 2017 | 15:00 | Japan | 14–0 | Great Britain | 4 | Pepsi Softball Centre | 1:20 | 87 | Boxscore |
| July 11, 2017 | 16:30 | Venezuela | 7–3 | New Zealand | 7 | Pepsi Softball Centre | 2:25 | 500 | Boxscore |
| July 12, 2017 | 10:00 | Venezuela | 7–1 | Botswana | 7 | Pepsi Softball Centre | 1:50 | 111 | Boxscore |
| July 12, 2017 | 14:00 | Great Britain | 24–1 | Turkey | 3 | Pepsi Softball Centre | 1:05 | 100 | Boxscore |
| July 12, 2017 | 15:00 | New Zealand | 8–1 | Denmark | 5 | Pepsi Softball Centre | 1:30 | 222 | Boxscore |
| July 12, 2017 | 16:30 | Japan | 9–1 | Czech Republic | 5 | Pepsi Softball Centre | 1:22 | 300 | Boxscore |
| July 13, 2017 | 10:00 | Turkey | 0–20 | Czech Republic | 3 | Pepsi Softball Centre | 0:47 | 99 | Boxscore |
| July 13, 2017 | 11:30 | Botswana | 0–7 | New Zealand | 5 | Pepsi Softball Centre | 1:22 | 200 | Boxscore |
| July 13, 2017 | 14:00 | Venezuela | 11–0 | Great Britain | 4 | Pepsi Softball Centre | 1:18 | 150 | Boxscore |
| July 13, 2017 | 17:30 | Japan | 11–0 | Denmark | 4 | Pepsi Softball Centre | 1:32 | 98 | Boxscore |

== Championship Round ==
=== Bracket ===
Quarterfinals
A1 Canada | 2
B2 Japan | 0
A3 Argentina | 5
B4 Botswana | 0

Semifinal Qualifiers
Japan | 3
Argentina | 5

Quarterfinals
B1 New Zealand | 6
A2 Australia | 2
B3 Venezuela | 3
A4 United States | 11

Semifinal Qualifiers
Australia | 11
United States | 7

Semifinals
Canada | 11
New Zealand | 12
Argentina | 1
Australia | 4

Bronze Medal Game
Canada | 3
Australia | 7

Final
New Zealand | 6
Australia | 4

=== Quarterfinals ===
| Date | Local time | Road team | Score | Home team | Inn. | Venue | Game duration | Attendance | Boxscore |
|---|---|---|---|---|---|---|---|---|---|
| July 14, 2017 | 11:30 | Botswana | 0–5 | Argentina | 7 | Pepsi Softball Centre | 1:34 | 200 | Boxscore |
| July 14, 2017 | 14:00 | United States | 11–3 | Venezuela | 5 | Pepsi Softball Centre | 1:52 | 550 | Boxscore |
| July 14, 2017 | 16:30 | Japan | 0–2 | Canada | 7 | Pepsi Softball Centre | 1:37 | 1,853 | Boxscore |
| July 14, 2017 | 19:00 | Australia | 2–6 | New Zealand | | Pepsi Softball Centre | 1:55 | 1,272 | Boxscore |

=== Semifinal Qualifiers ===
| Date | Local time | Road team | Score | Home team | Inn. | Venue | Game duration | Attendance | Boxscore |
|---|---|---|---|---|---|---|---|---|---|
| July 15, 2017 | 11:00 | Argentina | 5–3 | Japan | 7 | Pepsi Softball Centre | 1:55 | 354 | Boxscore |
| July 15, 2017 | 13:30 | United States | 7–11 | Australia | 7 | Pepsi Softball Centre | 2:19 | 651 | Boxscore |

=== Semifinals ===
| Date | Local time | Road team | Score | Home team | Inn. | Venue | Game duration | Attendance | Boxscore |
|---|---|---|---|---|---|---|---|---|---|
| July 15, 2017 | 16:00 | New Zealand | 12–11 | Canada | 7 | Pepsi Softball Centre | 3:41 | 967 | Boxscore |
| July 15, 2017 | 18:30 | Argentina | 1–4 | Australia | 7 | Pepsi Softball Centre | 1:42 | 110 | Boxscore |

=== Bronze Medal Game ===
| Date | Local time | Road team | Score | Home team | Inn. | Venue | Game duration | Attendance | Boxscore |
|---|---|---|---|---|---|---|---|---|---|
| July 16, 2017 | 13:00 | Australia | 7–3 | Canada | 7 | Pepsi Softball Centre | 2:19 | 1,284 | Boxscore |

=== Final ===
| Date | Local time | Road team | Score | Home team | Inn. | Venue | Game duration | Attendance | Boxscore |
|---|---|---|---|---|---|---|---|---|---|
| July 16, 2017 | 16:00 | Australia | 4–6 | New Zealand | 7 | Pepsi Softball Centre | 1:49 | 1,280 | Boxscore |

== Placement round ==
=== Bracket ===
Placement Quarterfinals
A5 Dominican Republic | 6
B6 Denmark | 0
B7 Great Britain | 8
A8 India | 1

Placement Semifinal Qualifiers
Denmark | 6
Great Britain | 1

Placement Quarterfinals
B5 Czech Republic | 7
A6 South Africa | 8
A7 Hong Kong | 15
B8 Turkey | 0

Placement Semifinal Qualifiers
Czech Republic | 6
Hong Kong | 2

Placement Semifinals
Dominican Republic | 2
South Africa | 11
Denmark | 3
Czech Republic | 5

11th place game
Dominican Republic | 0
Czech Republic | 7

Placement Final
South Africa | 0
Czech Republic | 8

=== Placement Quarterfinals ===
| Date | Local time | Road team | Score | Home team | Inn. | Venue | Game duration | Attendance | Boxscore |
|---|---|---|---|---|---|---|---|---|---|
| July 14, 2017 | 10:00 | Turkey | 0–15 | Hong Kong | 3 | Pepsi Softball Centre | 0:55 | 100 | Boxscore |
| July 14, 2017 | 12:30 | India | 1–8 | Great Britain | 5 | Pepsi Softball Centre | 1:25 | 101 | Boxscore |
| July 14, 2017 | 15:00 | South Africa | 8–7 | Czech Republic | 7 | Pepsi Softball Centre | 1:54 | 102 | Boxscore |
| July 14, 2017 | 17:30 | Denmark | 0–6 | Dominican Republic | 7 | Pepsi Softball Centre | 1:30 | 103 | Boxscore |

=== Placement Semifinal Qualifiers ===
| Date | Local time | Road team | Score | Home team | Inn. | Venue | Game duration | Attendance | Boxscore |
|---|---|---|---|---|---|---|---|---|---|
| July 15, 2017 | 11:30 | Hong Kong | 2–6 | Czech Republic | 7 | Pepsi Softball Centre | 1:39 | 53 | Boxscore |
| July 15, 2017 | 14:00 | Great Britain | 1–6 | Denmark | 7 | Pepsi Softball Centre | 1:36 | 58 | Boxscore |

=== Placement Semifinals ===
| Date | Local time | Road team | Score | Home team | Inn. | Venue | Game duration | Attendance | Boxscore |
|---|---|---|---|---|---|---|---|---|---|
| July 15, 2017 | 16:30 | South Africa | 11–2 | Dominican Republic | 6 | Pepsi Softball Centre | 2:12 | 27 | Boxscore |
| July 15, 2017 | 19:00 | Denmark | 3–5 | Czech Republic | 7 | Pepsi Softball Centre | 1:51 | 28 | Boxscore |

=== 11th place game ===
| Date | Local time | Road team | Score | Home team | Inn. | Venue | Game duration | Attendance | Boxscore |
|---|---|---|---|---|---|---|---|---|---|
| July 16, 2017 | 11:00 | Dominican Republic | 0–7 | Czech Republic | | Pepsi Softball Centre | | | Forfeit |

=== Placement Final ===
| Date | Local time | Road team | Score | Home team | Inn. | Venue | Game duration | Attendance | Boxscore |
|---|---|---|---|---|---|---|---|---|---|
| July 16, 2017 | 14:00 | South Africa | 0–8 | Czech Republic | 5 | Pepsi Softball Centre | 1:14 | 40 | Boxscore |

== Final standings ==
| Rk | Team | W | L |
|---|---|---|---|
| 1 | New Zealand | 9 | 1 |
| 2 | Australia | 8 | 4 |
| 3 | Canada | 8 | 2 |
| 4 | Argentina | 7 | 3 |
| 5 | Japan | 6 | 3 |
| 6 | United States | 6 | 3 |
| 7 | Venezuela | 6 | 2 |
| 8 | Botswana | 3 | 5 |
Failed to qualify for Playoffs
| 9 | Czech Republic | 7 | 5 |
| 10 | South Africa | 4 | 6 |
| 11 | Dominican Republic | 4 | 6 |
| 12 | Denmark | 4 | 6 |
| 13 | Great Britain | 2 | 7 |
| 14 | Hong Kong | 2 | 7 |
| 15 | India | 0 | 8 |
| 16 | Turkey | 0 | 8 |
