= Softball at the 2015 Pan American Games – Men's team rosters =

This article shows the rosters of all participating teams at the men's softball tournament at the 2015 Pan American Games in Toronto. Rosters could have a maximum of 15 athletes.

== Argentina ==
The Argentine softball men's team that will compete at the 2015 Pan American Games:

- Mauricio Caceres
- Santiago Carril
- Sebastian Gervasutti
- Gustavo Godoy
- Roman Godoy
- Manuel Godoy
- Juan Malarczuk
- Huemul Mata
- Teo Migliavacca
- Mariano Montero
- Pablo Montero
- Bruno Motroni
- Fernando Petric
- Juan Potolicchio
- Juan Zara

== Canada ==
Canada announced their squad on June 11, 2015.

- Ryan Boland
- Sean Cleary
- Jeff Ellsworth
- Brad Ezekiel
- Ian Fehrman
- Jason Hill
- Brandon Horn
- Paul Koert
- Derek Mayson
- Steve Mullaley
- Mathieu Roy
- Jason Sanford
- Kevin Schellenberg
- Andy Skelton
- Ryan Wolfe

== Dominican Republic ==
The Dominican Republic was represented by the following athletes:

- Randy Álvarez
- Melvin Batista
- José Bueno
- Melvin Cruz
- Julio Díaz
- Santiago Díaz
- Pablo Figuereo
- Sergio la Hoz
- Luis Martínez
- Freddy Moreta
- Juan Núñez
- Yennier Pérez
- Wilton Robles
- Stalin Rosario
- Engel Santana

== United States ==
The United States men's team roster.

- Kris Bogach
- Freddy Carmona
- Kevin Castillo
- Nate Devine
- Josh Johnson
- Tony Mancha
- Chris Miljavac
- Gerald Muizelaar
- Nick Mullins
- Matt Palazzo
- Bobby Rosthenhausler
- Pat Sagdal
- Rylan Sandoval
- Chase Turner
- Derrick Zechman

== Venezuela ==
Venezuela's roster consisted of 15 athletes.

- Arturo Acacio
- Yeider Chirinos
- Joan Colombo
- Rafael Flores
- Pedro Gonzalez
- Ramon Jones
- Jorge Lima
- Edwin Linares
- Tulio Linares
- Iran Paez
- Luiger Pinto
- Kerlis Rivero
- Rogelio Sequera
- Erick Urbaneja
- John Zambrano
