= 2025 Men's Softball World Cup Finals =

Softball competition

The 2025 Men's Softball World Cup Finals is a round-robin tournament of the 2025 Men's Softball World Cup taking place from 8 to 13 July. The top two teams from each pool qualified for the top eight finals stage along with two wildcards. The eight teams were split into two groups with the top two qualifying for the super round. After the super round the top two teams then qualified for the final.

== Qualified teams ==
Pool	Final winners	Repechage winners	Wildcard
A	Dominican Republic	Australia	Venezuela
B	Argentina	New Zealand	Canada
C	United States	Japan	

== Group A ==
Pos	Team	Pld	W	L	RF	RA	RD	PCT	GB	Qualification
1	Venezuela	3	2	1	17	13	+4	.667 (Note: Head to head results: Venezuela 7–2 New Zealand.)	—	Advance to Super Round
2	New Zealand	3	2	1	14	11	+3	.667	—	Advance to Super Round
3	Argentina	3	1	2	8	8	0	.333 (Note: Head to head results: Argentina 7–3 Canada.)	1	Advance to Placement Round
4	Canada (H)	3	1	2	17	24	−7	.333	1	Advance to Placement Round

Source: WBSC
Rules for classification: 1) Wins/losses; 2) Head to head; 3) Head to head runs against; 4) Runs against; 5) Head to head
(H) Hosts
Notes:

Date	Local time	Road team	Score	Home team	Inn.	Venue	Game duration	Attendance	Boxscore
8 July 2025	14:30	Venezuela	1–0	Argentina	7	Prime Ministers’ Park	1:55	833	Boxscore
8 July 2025	20:30	New Zealand	8–3	Canada	7	Prime Ministers’ Park	2:44	2,000	Boxscore
9 July 2025	17:30	Canada	11–9	Venezuela	7	Prime Ministers’ Park	3:05	1,000	Boxscore
9 July 2025	20:30	New Zealand	4–1	Argentina	7	Prime Ministers’ Park	2:22	2,000	Boxscore
10 July 2025	14:30	Venezuela	7–2	New Zealand	7	Prime Ministers’ Park	2:11	800	Boxscore
10 July 2025	21:30	Argentina	7–3	Canada	7	Prime Ministers’ Park	2:27	1,200	Boxscore

=== Matches ===
==== Venezuela vs Argentina ====
8 July 2025 14:30 Prime Ministers’ Park
Team	1	2	3	4	5	6	7	R	H	E
Venezuela	0	0	0	0	0	1	0	1	3	0
Argentina	0	0	0	0	0	0	0	0	5	0
WP: Maiker Pimentel Sivira (1–0) LP: Huemul Mata (0–1); Attendance: 833; Boxscore

==== New Zealand vs Canada ====
8 July 2025 20:30 Prime Ministers’ Park
Team	1	2	3	4	5	6	7	R	H	E
New Zealand	2	1	1	1	0	3	0	8	10	1
Canada	0	1	0	0	2	0	0	3	8	2
WP: Michael Pita (1–0) LP: Sean Cleary (0–1); Home runs: NZL: Reilly Makea (1); CAN: Quinten Bruce (1); Attendance: 2,000; Boxscore

==== Canada vs Venezuela ====
9 July 2025 17:30 Prime Ministers’ Park
Team	1	2	3	4	5	6	7	R	H	E
Canada	0	2	1	2	0	3	3	11	11	1
Venezuela	0	4	0	1	4	0	0	9	12	0
WP: Ty Sebastian (1–0) LP: Luis Colombo Perez (0–1); Home runs: CAN: Blake Hunter (1), Bradley Ezekiel 2 (2); VEN: Jose Dorantes Lopez (1), Rafael Flores (1), Pedro Flores (1); Attendance: 1,000; Boxscore

==== New Zealand vs Argentina ====
9 July 2025 20:30 Prime Ministers’ Park
Team	1	2	3	4	5	6	7	R	H	E
New Zealand	0	1	0	0	2	0	1	4	0	0
Argentina	0	1	0	0	0	0	0	1	0	0
WP: Liam James (1–0) LP: Roman Godoy (0–1); Attendance: 2,000; Boxscore

==== Venezuela vs New Zealand ====
10 July 2025 15:30 Prime Ministers’ Park
Team	1	2	3	4	5	6	7	R	H	E
Venezuela	0	1	4	0	0	2	0	7	7	0
New Zealand	0	0	0	1	0	1	0	2	6	0
WP: Maiker Pimentel Silvira (2–0) LP: Michael Pita (1–1); Home runs: VEN: Engelbert Herrera (1), Kleiver Rodriguez Barreto (1); NZL: Thomas Enoka (1), Cole Evans (1); Attendance: 800; Boxscore

==== Argentina vs Canada ====
10 July 2025 21:30 Prime Ministers’ Park
Team	1	2	3	4	5	6	7	R	H	E
Argentina	0	0	2	1	0	1	3	7	10	1
Canada	0	0	0	1	2	0	0	3	5	1
WP: Matias Etchevers (1–0) LP: Sean Cleary (0–2); Home runs: NZL: Alan Peker 2 (2); CAN: Mathieu Roy (1); Attendance: 1,200; Boxscore

== Group B ==
Pos	Team	Pld	W	L	RF	RA	RD	PCT	GB	Qualification
1	Japan	3	2	1	18	9	+9	.667	—	Advance to Super Round
2	United States	3	2	1	25	6	+19	.667	—	Advance to Super Round
3	Australia	3	1	2	11	23	−12	.333	1	Advance to Placement Round
4	Dominican Republic	3	1	2	6	22	−16	.333	1	Advance to Placement Round

First match(es) will be played: 8 July 2025. Source: WBSC
Rules for classification: 1) Wins/losses; 2) Head to head; 3) Head to head runs against; 4) Runs against; 5) Head to head

Date	Local time	Road team	Score	Home team	Inn.	Venue	Game duration	Attendance	Boxscore
8 July 2025	12:30	Japan	2–3	Dominican Republic	7	Prime Ministers’ Park			Boxscore
8 July 2025	17:30	United States	10–0	Australia	7	Prime Ministers’ Park			Boxscore
9 July 2025	12:30	Dominican Republic	2–9	Australia	6	Prime Ministers’ Park			Boxscore
9 July 2025	15:30	United States	4–5	Japan	7	Prime Ministers’ Park			Boxscore
10 July 2025	12:30	Dominican Republic	1–11	United States	4	Prime Ministers’ Park			Boxscore
10 July 2025	18:30	Australia	2–11	Japan	5	Prime Ministers’ Park			Boxscore

=== Matches ===
==== Dominican Republic vs Japan ====
8 July 2025 12:30 Prime Ministers’ Park
Team	1	2	3	4	5	6	7	R	H	E
Japan	0	0	0	1	0	0	1	2	2	0
Dominican Republic	0	0	0	0	1	1	1	3	7	0
WP: Michael de Jesús Batista Santos LP: Shota Onodera; Boxscore

==== United States vs Australia ====
8 July 2025 17:30 Prime Ministers’ Park
Team	1	2	3	4	5	6	7	R	H	E
United States	0	1	0	0	2	1	6	10	11	0
Australia	0	0	0	0	0	0	0	0	1	2
WP: Marco Diaz LP: Jack Besgrove; Boxscore

==== Dominican Republic vs Australia ====
9 July 2025 12:30 Prime Ministers’ Park
Team	1	2	3	4	5	6	7	R	H	E
Dominican Republic	0	1	0	0	0	1	X	2	4	2
Australia (5)	0	0	0	3	0	6	X	9	7	0
WP: Jack Besgrove LP: Yan Carlos Gonzalez Diaz; Boxscore

==== United States vs Japan ====
9 July 2025 15:30 Prime Ministers’ Park
Team	1	2	3	4	5	6	7	R	H	E
United States	0	0	0	0	3	1	0	4	5	0
Japan	2	0	0	0	1	2	X	5	9	0
WP: Hiroki Ikeda LP: Marco Diaz; Boxscore

==== Dominican Republic vs United States ====
10 July 2025 12:30 Prime Ministers’ Park
Team	1	2	3	4	5	6	7	R	H	E
Dominican Republic	0	0	0	1	X	X	X	1	4	1
United States (4)	0	0	1	10	X	X	X	11	8	0
WP: Marco Diaz LP: Michael de Jesús Batista Santos; Boxscore

==== Australia vs Japan ====
10 July 2025 18:30 Prime Ministers’ Park
Team	1	2	3	4	5	6	7	R	H	E
Australia	0	0	2	0	0	X	X	2	3	1
Japan (5)	0	5	1	5	X	X	X	11	11	0
WP: Hiroki Ikeda LP: Jack Besgrove; Boxscore

== Placement Round ==
Pos	Team	Pld	W	L	RF	RA	RD	PCT	GB
1	Canada	3	2	1	21	12	+9	.667	—
2	Argentina	3	2	1	23	16	+7	.667	—
3	Australia	3	2	1	18	21	−3	.667	—
4	Dominican Republic	3	0	3	11	24	−13	.000	2

First match(es) will be played: 11 July 2025. Source: WBSC
Rules for classification: 1) Wins/losses; 2) Head to head; 3) Head to head runs against; 4) Runs against; 5) Head to head

Date	Local time	Road team	Score	Home team	Inn.	Venue	Game duration	Attendance	Boxscore
11 July 2025	12:30	Australia	7–5	Argentina	7	Prime Ministers’ Park			Boxscore
11 July 2025	18:30	Dominican Republic	3–4	Canada	7	Prime Ministers’ Park			Boxscore
12 July 2025	12:30	Dominican Republic	6–11	Argentina	7	Prime Ministers’ Park			Boxscore
12 July 2025	15:30	Canada	14–2	Australia	4	Prime Ministers’ Park			Boxscore

=== Matches ===
==== Australia vs Argentina ====
11 July 2025 12:30 Prime Ministers’ Park
Team	1	2	3	4	5	6	7	R	H	E
Australia	0	4	3	0	0	0	0	7	10	1
Argentina	3	1	0	0	0	0	1	5	8	1
WP: Jack Besgrove LP: Matias Etchevers; Boxscore

==== Dominican Republic vs Canada ====
11 July 2025 : Prime Ministers’ Park
Team	1	2	3	4	5	6	7	R	H	E
Dominican Republic	0	0	3	3	0	0	0	3	7	0
Canada	2	0	0	0	2	0	X	4	8	1
WP: Sean Cleary LP: Jonni Javier Suriel Fernández; Boxscore

==== Dominican Republic vs Argentina ====
12 July 2025 12:30 Prime Ministers’ Park
Team	1	2	3	4	5	6	7	R	H	E
Dominican Republic	4	0	0	0	1	1	0	6	9	0
Argentina	0	0	5	4	0	2	X	11	12	1
WP: Huemul Mata LP: Michael de Jesús Batista Santos Sv: Pablo Migliavacca; Boxscore

==== Canada vs Australia ====
12 July 2025 : Prime Ministers’ Park
Team	1	2	3	4	5	6	7	R	H	E
Canada (4)	2	7	2	3	X	X	X	14	15	1
Australia	1	0	1	0	X	X	X	2	5	1
WP: Ty Christopher Harvey Sebastian LP: Marshall Kronk; Boxscore

== Super Round ==
Pos	Team	Pld	W	L	RF	RA	RD	PCT	GB	Qualification
1	Venezuela	3	2	1	14	11	+3	.667	—	Advance to Final
2	New Zealand	3	2	1	15	14	+1	.667	—	Advance to Final
3	Japan	3	2	1	13	13	0	.667	—	Advance to Third place play-off
4	United States	3	0	3	12	16	−4	.000	2	Advance to Third place play-off

First match(es) will be played: 11 July 2025. Source: WBSC
Rules for classification: 1) Wins/losses; 2) Head to head; 3) Head to head runs against; 4) Runs against; 5) Head to head

Date	Local time	Road team	Score	Home team	Inn.	Venue	Game duration	Attendance	Boxscore
11 July 2025	14:30	United States	4–5	New Zealand	7	Prime Ministers’ Park	1:57	700	Boxscore
11 July 2025	20:30	Venezuela	1–5	Japan	7	Prime Ministers’ Park	1:57	400	Boxscore
12 July 2025	17:30	United States	4–6	Venezuela	7	Prime Ministers’ Park	1:53	1400	Boxscore
12 July 2025	20:30	New Zealand	8–3	Japan	7	Prime Ministers’ Park	2:39	1000	Boxscore

=== Matches ===
==== United States vs New Zealand ====
11 July 2025 15:30 Prime Ministers’ Park
Team	1	2	3	4	5	6	7	R	H	E
United States	0	1	2	1	0	0	0	4	8	0
New Zealand	0	1	0	0	0	1	3	5	7	2
WP: Liam James Potts LP: Marco Diaz; Boxscore

==== Venezuela vs Japan ====
11 July 2025 21:30 Prime Ministers’ Park
Team	1	2	3	4	5	6	7	R	H	E
Venezuela	1	0	0	0	0	0	0	1	4	1
Japan	1	0	2	2	0	0	X	5	5	0
WP: Hiroki Ikeda LP: Maiker Josue Pimentel Silvira; Boxscore

==== United States vs Venezuela ====
12 July 2025 17:30 Prime Ministers’ Park
Team	1	2	3	4	5	6	7	R	H	E
United States	0	0	0	0	0	4	0	4	3	1
Venezuela	0	0	2	2	2	0	X	6	8	1
WP: Maiker Josue Pimentel Silva LP: Bradley Kilpatrick; Boxscore

==== New Zealand vs Japan ====
12 July 2025 20:30 Prime Ministers’ Park
Team	1	2	3	4	5	6	7	R	H	E
New Zealand	4	1	0	1	0	1	1	8	8	1
Japan	2	0	0	1	0	0	0	3	6	2
WP: Pita Michael Rona LP: Fuga Nagai; Boxscore

== Final Round ==
=== Third place play-off ===
13 July 2025 11:00 Prime Ministers' Park
Team	1	2	3	4	5	6	7	R	H	E
United States	0	0	0	0	4	3	3	10	8	0
Japan	0	0	1	0	0	0	0	1	8	0
WP: Marco Diaz LP: Hiroki Ikeda; Boxscore

=== Final ===
13 July 2025 14:00 Prime Ministers' Park
Team	1	2	3	4	5	6	7	R	H	E
New Zealand	0	0	0	0	0	0	0	0	3	0
Venezuela	0	0	1	0	0	2	X	3	3	0
WP: Maiker Josue Pimentel Silvira LP: Liam James Potts; Boxscore

== See also ==
- 2025 Men's Softball World Cup Group A
- 2025 Men's Softball World Cup Group B
- 2025 Men's Softball World Cup Group C
