= 2025 Men's Softball World Cup Group A =

Group A of the 2025 Men's Softball World Cup took place from 12 to 16 June 2023 in Hermosillo, Mexico. The group consisted of host nation Mexico, defending champions Australia, Czech Republic, Dominican Republic, Philippines and Venezuela.

== Standings ==
Group A was contested in Sonora during 12–16 June 2024.

Pos	Team	Pld	W	L	RF	RA	RD	PCT	GB	Qualification
1	Venezuela	5	5	0	31	6	+25	1.000	—	Advance to Group A Final
2	Dominican Republic	5	3	2	22	16	+6	.600	2	Advance to Group A Final
3	Australia	5	2	3	18	23	−5	.400 (Note: Head-to-head, TQB: Australia 1-1, 0.267; Mexico 1-1, 0.153; Czechia 1-1, -0.500)	3	Advance to Group A third place play-off
4	Mexico (H)	5	2	3	15	14	+1	.400	3	Advance to Group A third place play-off
5	Czechia	5	2	3	17	39	−22	.400	3	
6	Philippines	5	1	4	13	18	−5	.200	4	

Source: WBSC
Rules for classification: 1) Wins/losses; 2) Head-to-head record; 3) TQB; 4) ER-TQB; 5) Highest batting average; 6) Coin toss
(H) Hosts

== Summary ==
Date	Local time	Road team	Score	Home team	Inn.	Venue	Game duration	Attendance	Boxscore
12 June 2024	16:00	Venezuela	7–0	Australia	7	Estadio Fernando M. Ortiz	2:05	200	Boxscore
12 June 2024	16:00	Dominican Republic	5–2	Philippines	7	Estadio Mundialistas Hermosillenses	2:04	102	Boxscore
12 June 2024	21:00	Mexico	7–0	Czechia	5	Estadio Fernando M. Ortiz	1:35	1,100	Boxscore
13 June 2024	17:00	Dominican Republic	13–4	Czechia	7	Estadio Fernando M. Ortiz	2:56	245	Boxscore
13 June 2024	18:00	Philippines	4–5	Australia	7	Estadio Mundialistas Hermosillenses	2:12	72	Boxscore
13 June 2024	20:00	Mexico	2–5	Venezuela	7	Estadio Fernando M. Ortiz	2:03	1,560	Boxscore
13 June 2024	21:00	Australia	1–4	Dominican Republic	7	Estadio Mundialistas Hermosillenses	1:55	83	Boxscore
14 June 2024	17:00	Philippines	3–1	Mexico	7	Estadio Fernando M. Ortiz	1:55	600	Boxscore
14 June 2024	18:00	Czechia	2–11	Venezuela	5	Estadio Mundialistas Hermosillenses	1:56	85	Boxscore
14 June 2024	20:00	Australia	6–1	Mexico	8	Estadio Fernando M. Ortiz	2:32	1,200	Boxscore
14 June 2024	21:00	Dominican Republic	0–5	Venezuela	7	Estadio Mundialistas Hermosillenses	2:02	200	Boxscore
15 June 2024	17:00	Czechia	7–6	Australia	7	Estadio Fernando M. Ortiz	2:16	220	Boxscore
15 June 2024	18:00	Venezuela	3–2	Philippines	8	Estadio Mundialistas Hermosillenses	2:29	62	Boxscore
15 June 2024	20:00	Mexico	4–0	Dominican Republic	7	Estadio Fernando M. Ortiz	1:39	800	Boxscore
15 June 2024	21:00	Philippines	2–4	Czechia	7	Estadio Mundialistas Hermosillenses	2:07	265	Boxscore

== Matches ==
=== Venezuela vs Australia ===
12 June 2024 16:00 Estadio Fernando M. Ortiz 46 °C (115 °F), sunny
Team	1	2	3	4	5	6	7	R	H	E
Venezuela	0	0	0	2	0	2	3	7	9	0
Australia	0	0	0	0	0	0	0	0	3	1
Attendance: 200; Boxscore

=== Dominican Republic vs Philippines ===
12 June 2024 16:00 Estadio Mundialistas Hermosillenses 46 °C (115 °F), sunny
Team	1	2	3	4	5	6	7	R	H	E
Dominican Republic	0	1	0	4	0	0	0	5	7	0
Philippines	0	0	0	1	0	1	0	2	9	1
Attendance: 102; Boxscore

=== Mexico vs Czechia ===
12 June 2024 21:00 Estadio Fernando M. Ortiz 38 °C (100 °F), clear
Team	1	2	3	4	5	6	7	R	H	E
Mexico (5)	0	0	2	2	3	X	X	7	11	1
Czechia	0	0	0	0	0	X	X	0	2	2
Attendance: 1,100; Boxscore

=== Dominican Republic vs Czechia ===
13 June 2024 17:00 Estadio Fernando M. Ortiz 41 °C (106 °F), partly cloudy
Team	1	2	3	4	5	6	7	R	H	E
Dominican Republic	2	0	5	0	0	1	5	13	20	0
Czechia	0	0	0	0	1	2	1	4	8	1
Attendance: 245; Boxscore

=== Philippines vs Australia ===
13 June 2024 18:00 Estadio Mundialistas Hermosillenses 39 °C (102 °F), partly cloudy
Team	1	2	3	4	5	6	7	R	H	E
Philippines	0	0	3	0	0	1	0	4	5	0
Australia	2	0	0	0	3	0	X	5	7	0
Attendance: 72; Boxscore

=== Mexico vs Venezuela ===
13 June 2024 20:00 Estadio Fernando M. Ortiz 34 °C (93 °F), clear
Team	1	2	3	4	5	6	7	R	H	E
Mexico	0	1	0	1	0	0	0	2	3	0
Venezuela	2	0	0	1	0	2	X	5	6	1
Attendance: 1,560; Boxscore

=== Australia vs Dominican Republic ===
13 June 2024 21:00 Estadio Mundialistas Hermosillenses 33 °C (91 °F), clear
Team	1	2	3	4	5	6	7	R	H	E
Australia	0	0	0	0	1	0	0	1	3	2
Dominican Republic	3	1	0	0	0	0	X	4	6	0
Attendance: 83; Boxscore

=== Philippines vs Mexico ===
14 June 2024 17:00 Estadio Fernando M. Ortiz 40 °C (104 °F), sunny
Team	1	2	3	4	5	6	7	R	H	E
Philippines	0	2	0	0	0	0	1	3	8	0
Mexico	0	0	1	0	0	0	0	1	3	0
Attendance: 600; Boxscore

=== Czechia vs Venezuela ===
14 June 2024 18:00 Estadio Mundialistas Hermosillenses 41 °C (106 °F), sunny
Team	1	2	3	4	5	6	7	R	H	E
Czechia	0	2	0	0	0	X	X	2	4	1
Venezuela (5)	4	5	1	1	X	X	X	11	13	1
Attendance: 85; Boxscore

=== Australia vs Mexico ===
14 June 2024 20:00 Estadio Fernando M. Ortiz 35 °C (95 °F), clear
Team	1	2	3	4	5	6	7	8	R	H	E
Australia (8)	0	0	0	0	0	0	5	5	6	10	2
Mexico	0	0	0	0	0	1	0	0	1	8	0
Attendance: 1,200; Boxscore

=== Dominican Republic vs Venezuela ===
14 June 2024 21:00 Estadio Mundialistas Hermosillenses 36 °C (97 °F), cloudy
Team	1	2	3	4	5	6	7	R	H	E
Dominican Republic	0	0	0	0	0	0	0	0	4	1
Venezuela	0	1	0	0	3	1	X	5	9	0
Attendance: 200; Boxscore

=== Czechia vs Australia ===
15 June 2024 17:00 Estadio Fernando M. Ortiz 39 °C (102 °F), sunny
Team	1	2	3	4	5	6	7	R	H	E
Czechia	0	2	0	2	3	0	0	7	9	2
Australia	1	3	0	0	0	0	2	6	6	1
Attendance: 220; Boxscore

=== Venezuela vs Philippines ===
15 June 2024 18:00 Estadio Mundialistas Hermosillenses 38 °C (100 °F), sunny
Team	1	2	3	4	5	6	7	8	R	H	E
Venezuela (8)	0	0	2	0	0	0	0	1	3	12	2
Philippines	0	1	0	0	0	1	0	0	2	5	1
Attendance: 62; Boxscore

=== Mexico vs Dominican Republic ===
15 June 2024 20:00 Estadio Fernando M. Ortiz 34 °C (93 °F), clear
Team	1	2	3	4	5	6	7	R	H	E
Mexico	0	2	0	0	0	1	1	4	8	0
Dominican Republic	0	0	0	0	0	0	0	0	3	3
Attendance: 800; Boxscore

=== Philippines vs Czechia ===
15 June 2024 21:00 Estadio Mundialistas Hermosillenses 32 °C (90 °F), clear
Team	1	2	3	4	5	6	7	R	H	E
Philippines	0	0	0	1	0	1	0	2	4	1
Czechia	0	0	2	1	0	0	X	4	6	1
Attendance: 265; Boxscore

== Play-offs ==
The winner of the final and the repechage qualified for the 2025 finals.

=== Bracket ===
Final
16 June – Estadio Fernando M. Ortiz
Dominican Republic	2
Venezuela	0
Third place play-off
16 June – Estadio Fernando M. Ortiz
Mexico	1
Australia	4

Repechage
16 June – Estadio Fernando M. Ortiz
Australia	4
Venezuela	1

=== Summary ===
Round	Date	Local Time	Road team	Score	Home team	Inn.	Venue	Game duration	Attendance	Boxscore
5th place match	16 June 2024	20:00	Philippines	2–3	Czechia	8	Estadio Mundialistas Hermosillenses			Boxscore
3rd place match	16 June 2024	17:00	Mexico	1–4	Australia	7	Estadio Fernando M. Ortiz	1:42	854	Boxscore
Final	16 June 2024	17:00	Dominican Republic	2–0	Venezuela	7	Estadio Mundialistas Hermosillenses	2:05	150	Boxscore
Repechage	16 June 2024	21:00	Australia	4–1	Venezuela	7	Estadio Fernando M. Ortiz			Boxscore

=== Fifth place play-off ===
16 June 2024 20:00 Estadio Mundialistas Hermosillenses
Team	1	2	3	4	5	6	7	R	H	E
Philippines	0	0	1	0	1	0	0	2	6	1
Czechia (8)	0	0	1	0	0	1	0	3	7	2
Boxscore

=== Third place play-off ===
16 June 2024 17:00 Estadio Fernando M. Ortiz 39 °C (102 °F), sunny
Team	1	2	3	4	5	6	7	R	H	E
Mexico	0	0	0	1	0	0	0	1	3	0
Australia	2	0	0	0	0	2	X	4	4	0
Attendance: 854; Boxscore

=== Final ===
16 June 2024 17:00 Estadio Mundialistas Hermosillenses 42 °C (108 °F), sunny
Team	1	2	3	4	5	6	7	R	H	E
Dominican Republic	1	0	0	0	1	0	0	2	5	1
Venezuela	0	0	0	0	0	0	0	0	4	0
Attendance: 150; Boxscore

=== Repechage ===
16 June 2024 21:00 Estadio Fernando M. Ortiz
Team	1	2	3	4	5	6	7	R	H	E
Australia	0	1	0	0	0	2	1	4	5	0
Venezuela	0	0	0	0	0	0	1	1	2	3
Boxscore

== See also ==
- 2025 Men's Softball World Cup Group B
- 2025 Men's Softball World Cup Group C
- 2025 Men's Softball World Cup Finals
