= Australia men's national softball team =

Australian men's national softball team

Information
- Country: Australia
- Federation: Softball Australia
- Confederation: WBSC Oceania
- Manager: Laing Harrow
- WBSC World Rank: 8 ▼2 (14 May 2026)

Men's Softball World Cup
- Appearances: 10 (First in 1988)
- Best result: (gold) 1st (2 times, most recent in 2022); (silver) 2nd (1 time, in 2017); (bronze) 3rd (2 times, most recent in 2013)

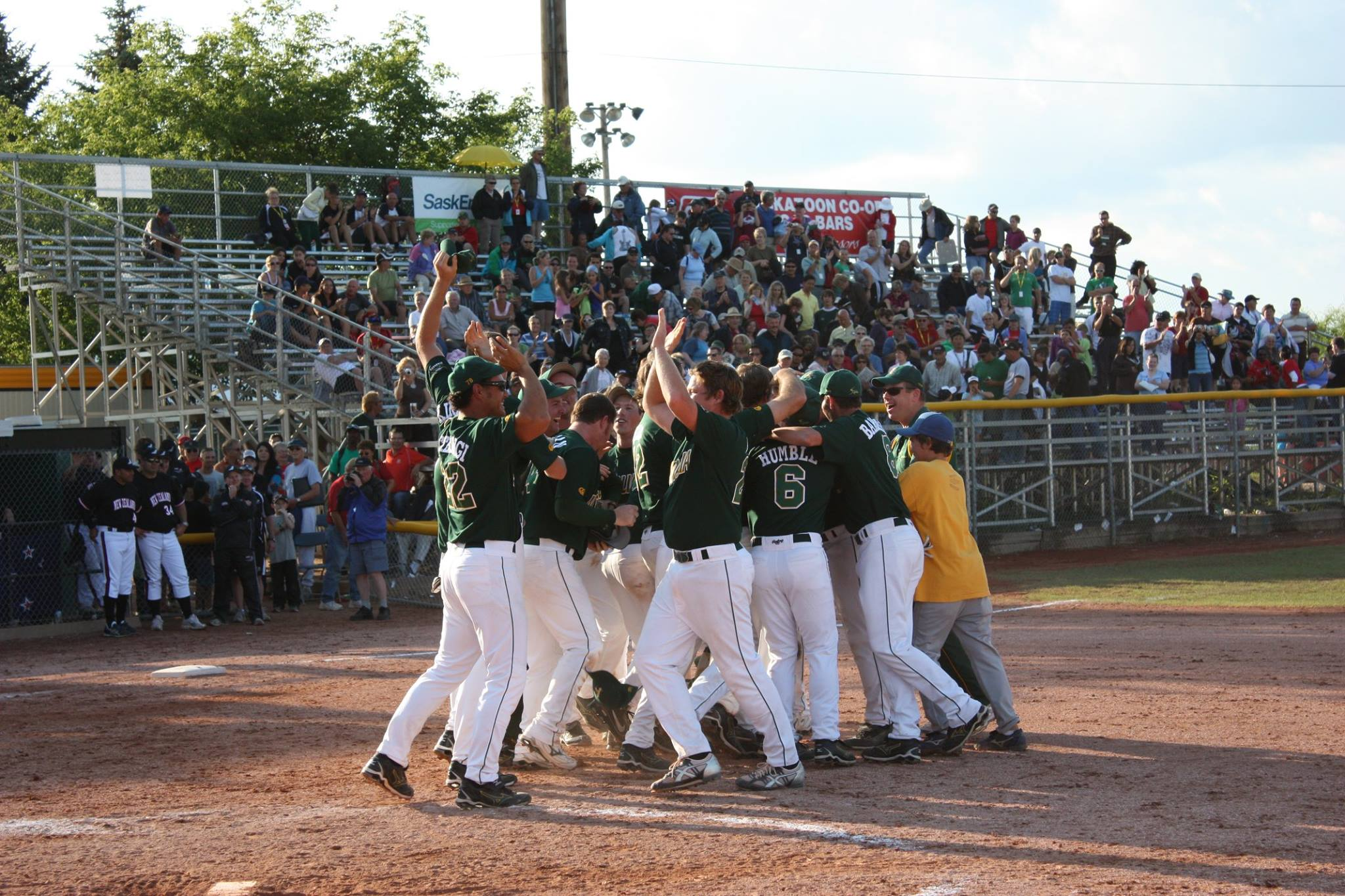
The moment the Aussie Steelers won the 2009 ISF World Championships in Saskatoon, Canada.

The Australian men's national softball team is the national softball team of Australia. They are nicknamed the Aussie Steelers. The team is governed by Softball Australia and takes part in international softball competitions.

== World Championships ==
The men's team competed at the 1988 World Championships, where they finished seventh. They also competed at the 1992 World Championships, where they finished fifth.

The 1988 World Championships were held in Saskatoon, Canada. This was the first time Australia sent a team to the competition. The team played 13 games in the round robin round, with a record of six wins and seven losses. They beat Mexico 4–3, Denmark 11–1, Zimbabwe 2–0, Chinese Taipei 2–0 and the Virgin Islands 11–1. They lost to Cuba 7–4, New Zealand 11–0, Canada 16–0, Japan 4–1, the Bahamas 1–0, the Philippines 4–3 and the United States 12–1. Australia did not compete in the semi-finals and finished seventh overall.

The 1992 World Championships, the eighth time the event was competed for, was held in Manila and was only the second time Australia competed in the event. In the lead up to the competition, Australia played several test matches in New Zealand again Japan and New Zealand. They beat Japan 3–0 in their only victory. They lost to New Zealand 13–3, 10–0 and 10–1. They also lost to Japan 5–3. In the round robin of the World Championships, Australia won six of its eight matches. They beat Guam 7–2, Chinese Taipei 9–2, Indonesia 5–4, Czechoslovakia 2–1, Singapore 14–0 and Mexico 10–0. They lost to Canada 5–4 and New Zealand 10–0. This record was not good enough to advance them to the semi-finals. Overall, they finished fifth, behind third-place finished the United States and fourth-place finishers Japan.

In 1996, Australia finished seventh. In 2000, Australia finished in the twelfth position. In 2004, the team finished third.

For the 2008 ISF Men's Regional World Championship Qualifier, Australia had to play New Zealand in a match in Auckland where the New Zealand Black Sox beat them 6–0. In other match in the qualifiers, Australia beat Papua New Guinea 8–0, Guam 16–0, Guam 15–0, and Papua New Guinea 5–0. Australia also lost to New Zealand a second time 5–3. In the qualifying finals, New Zealand again beat Australia 5–0.

Australia competed in the 2009 Men's World Softball Championship, with fifteen other teams. They finished first.

Australia qualified for the 2013 Men's World Softball Championship, which was held in New Zealand. They achieved 3rd place at this tournament.

Australia also qualified in 2015, achieving 4th place.

Australia qualified for the 2017 tournament held in Whitehorse, Yukon. They got 2nd place.

Australia qualified for the 2019 tournament held in Prague, Czech Republic. They got 7th place.

Australia qualified for the 2022 tournament held in Auckland, New Zealand. They came 1st, winning the championship for the second time.

Australia qualified for the 2025 tournament held in Prince Albert, Saskatchewan, Sonora, Mexico, and Oklahoma City. They came 7th.

As of July 2026, the World Baseball Softball Confederation rankings place them at 9th worldwide.

== Pacific International Series ==
Australia hosted the Pacific International Series in Canberra in 2007. At the competition, Australia had two men's side with the top team being Australia Greenand the second team being Australia Gold. During the first round of round robin play, Australia Green beat Australia Gold 7–2, beat Japan 2–1, lost to New Zealand 5–2, beat Japan 7–0, beat New Zealand 5–3, and lost to Australia Gold 5–4. This qualified them for the finals where they beat Australia Gold 7–6. Australia Green then went on to bear New Zealand 3–2 in the Grand Final.

== Test series and matches ==
In 1985, Australia had an unofficial test team of all-stars who played against the New Zealand national team in Melbourne. Team members included L. Anderson from Western Australia, A. Oldfather Jr from South Australia, E. Tyson from Queensland, T. Bull from Western Australia, S. Adams from Victoria, A. Oldfather Sr from South Australia, D. Rector from Western Australia, E Wulf from New South Wales, G. Knight from Western Australia, D. Cullen from New South Wales, R. Richardson from New South Wales and N. Tsoukalas from Victoria.

In 1991, the team played an eight-game test series against New Zealand, with four matches played in Perth and four played in Sydney. All eight matches were won by New Zealand. In Perth, the scores were 8–1, 1–0, 6–5 and 6–3. In Sydney, the scores were 10–1, 6–2, 6–1 and 4–2.

In 2007, the Australians hosted New Zealand for a test match in Canberra where Australia won.

In early 2012, the junior national team played a test match against the senior open men's team in Canberra.

== Men's U19 National Team - Junior Steelers ==
Australia has a men's national under 19 team, nicknamed the Colts. They competed at the 1993 Men's Junior World Championships, where the finished fourth. The competition was held in Auckland. In the round robin round, Australia won 7 games and lost 5. They beat Japan 3–0, Argentina 10–6, the United States 4–3, the Philippines 4–0, Argentina 6–1 and Japan 5–1. They lost to Canada 8–6, the United States 4–3, New Zealand 6–0, Canada 12–3, and New Zealand 2–1. This was good enough to qualify them for the semi-finals where they met Japan and lost 4–1. They were then eliminated from the competition as the next round was a preliminary final.

Australia also competed at the 2008 Men's Junior World Championships where they won gold for the fourth time in a row having previously won in 1997, 2001 and 2005. In 2011, the team played in a tournament in South America. Members of the 2012 team include two players from Canberra including Jesse Taws and Matthew Wickham.

== Indigenous players ==
There has been a push for greater Australian aboriginal and Torres Strait Islander participation in softball. One of the most recognisable male players is Aboriginal Jeff Goolagong who has played for the men's national team and appears on posters for Indigenous softball outreach efforts.
