= 2025 Men's Softball World Cup Group B =

Group B of the 2025 Men's Softball World Cup took place from 10 to 14 July 2024 in Prince Albert, Canada. The group consisted of host nation Canada, Argentina, Hong Kong, Israel, New Zealand and Singapore.

== Standings ==
Group B was contested in Prince Albert during 10–14 July 2024.

Pos	Team	Pld	W	L	RF	RA	RD	PCT	GB	Qualification
1	Argentina	5	5	0	45	1	+44	1.000	—	Advance to Group B Final
2	New Zealand	5	4	1	30	5	+25	.800	1	Advance to Group B Final
3	Canada (H)	5	3	2	22	9	+13	.600	2	Advance to Group B third place play-off
4	Singapore	5	2	3	26	26	0	.400	3	Advance to Group B third place play-off
5	Hong Kong, China	5	1	4	5	46	−41	.200	4	
6	Israel	5	0	5	3	44	−41	.000	5	

Source: WBSC
Rules for classification: 1) Wins/losses; 2) Head-to-head record; 3) TQB; 4) ER-TQB; 5) Highest batting average; 6) Coin toss
(H) Hosts

== Summary ==
Date	Local time	Road team	Score	Home team	Inn.	Venue	Game duration	Attendance	Boxscore
10 July 2024	11:00	Argentina	8–0	Israel	5	Prime Ministers’ Park			Boxscore
10 July 2024	16:00	Singapore	0–2	New Zealand	7	Prime Ministers’ Park			Boxscore
10 July 2024	18:00	Hong Kong, China	1–7	Canada	7	Prime Ministers’ Park			Boxscore
11 July 2024	10:00	New Zealand	10–0	Israel	4	Prime Ministers’ Park			Boxscore
11 July 2024	13:00	Israel	2–3	Hong Kong, China	7	Prime Ministers’ Park			Boxscore
11 July 2024	18:00	Canada	7–1	Singapore	7	Prime Ministers’ Park			Boxscore
11 July 2024	21:00	Canada	0–2	Argentina	7	Prime Ministers’ Park			Boxscore
12 July 2024	10:00	Singapore	16–1	Israel	4	Prime Ministers’ Park			Boxscore
12 July 2024	13:00	Singapore	9–1	Hong Kong, China	5	Prime Ministers’ Park			Boxscore
12 July 2024	18:00	Hong Kong, China	0–16	Argentina	3	Prime Ministers’ Park			Boxscore
12 July 2024	21:00	New Zealand	5–1	Canada	7	Prime Ministers’ Park			Boxscore
13 July 2024	10:00	Argentina	15–0	Singapore	3	Prime Ministers’ Park			Boxscore
13 July 2024	13:00	Argentina	4–1	New Zealand	7	Prime Ministers’ Park			Boxscore
13 July 2024	18:00	Hong Kong, China	0–12	New Zealand	4	Prime Ministers’ Park			Boxscore
13 July 2024	21:00	Israel	0–7	Canada	6	Prime Ministers’ Park			Boxscore

== Matches ==
=== Argentina vs. Israel ===
10 July 2024 11:00 Prime Ministers’ Park
Team	1	2	3	4	5	6	7	R	H	E
Argentina	1	0	3	0	4	X	X	8	7	0
Israel	0	0	0	0	0	X	X	0	1	1
Attendance: 200; Boxscore

=== Singapore vs. New Zealand ===
10 July 2024 16:00 Prime Ministers’ Park
Team	1	2	3	4	5	6	7	R	H	E
Singapore	0	0	0	0	0	0	0	0	2	1
New Zealand	0	0	0	1	1	0	X	2	3	3
Boxscore

=== Hong Kong, China vs. Canada ===
10 July 2024 18:00 Prime Ministers’ Park
Team	1	2	3	4	5	6	7	R	H	E
Hong Kong	0	0	0	0	0	1	0	1	4	2
Canada	0	0	1	3	2	1	X	7	8	0
Boxscore

=== New Zealand vs. Israel ===
11 July 2024 10:00 Prime Ministers’ Park
Team	1	2	3	4	5	6	7	R	H	E
New Zealand (5)	0	1	4	5	X	X	X	10	9	0
Israel	0	0	0	0	X	X	X	0	0	0
Boxscore

=== Israel vs. Hong Kong, China ===
10 July 2024 13:00 Prime Ministers’ Park
Team	1	2	3	4	5	6	7	R	H	E
Israel	0	1	0	0	0	1	0	2	8	1
Hong Kong	1	1	0	1	0	0	X	3	6	1
Boxscore

=== Canada vs. Singapore ===
11 July 2024 18:00 Prime Ministers’ Park
Team	1	2	3	4	5	6	7	R	H	E
Canada	1	0	0	0	1	0	5	7	9	0
Singapore	1	0	0	0	0	0	0	1	1	0
Boxscore

=== Canada vs. Argentina ===
11 July 2024 21:00 Prime Ministers’ Park
Team	1	2	3	4	5	6	7	R	H	E
Canada	0	0	0	0	0	0	0	0	4	0
Argentina	0	0	0	1	1	0	X	2	5	1
Boxscore

=== Singapore vs. Israel ===
12 July 2024 10:00 Prime Ministers’ Park
Team	1	2	3	4	5	6	7	R	H	E
Singapore (4)	4	5	3	4	X	X	X	16	18	0
Israel	0	0	1	0	X	X	X	1	1	0
Boxscore

=== Singapore vs. Hong Kong, China ===
12 July 2024 13:00 Prime Ministers’ Park
Team	1	2	3	4	5	6	7	R	H	E
Singapore (5)	2	0	2	0	5	X	X	9	9	0
New Zealand	0	0	0	1	0	X	X	1	2	2
Boxscore

=== Hong Kong, China vs. Argentina ===
12 July 2024 18:00 Prime Ministers’ Park
Team	1	2	3	4	5	6	7	R	H	E
Hong Kong, China	0	0	0	X	X	X	X	0	1	3
Argentina (3)	10	2	4	X	X	X	X	16	10	0
Boxscore

=== New Zealand vs. Canada ===
12 July 2024 21:00 Prime Ministers’ Park
Team	1	2	3	4	5	6	7	R	H	E
New Zealand	0	1	0	0	1	2	1	5	6	1
Canada	0	0	0	0	0	0	1	1	4	0
Boxscore

=== Argentina vs. Singapore ===
13 July 2024 10:00 Prime Ministers’ Park
Team	1	2	3	4	5	6	7	R	H	E
Argentina (3)	5	6	4	X	X	X	X	15	12	0
Singapore	0	0	0	X	X	X	X	0	1	1
Boxscore

=== Argentina vs. New Zealand ===
13 July 2024 13:00 Prime Ministers’ Park
Team	1	2	3	4	5	6	7	R	H	E
Argentina	0	1	0	0	0	3	0	4	7	0
New Zealand	0	0	0	0	0	1	0	1	1	1
Boxscore

=== Hong Kong, China vs. New Zealand ===
13 July 2024 18:00 Prime Ministers’ Park
Team	1	2	3	4	5	6	7	R	H	E
Hong Kong, China	0	0	0	0	X	X	X	0	2	0
New Zealand	4	6	2	X	X	X	X	12	11	0
Boxscore

=== Israel vs. Canada ===
13 July 2024 21:00 Prime Ministers’ Park
Team	1	2	3	4	5	6	7	R	H	E
Israel	0	0	0	0	0	0	X	0	2	2
Canada (5)	0	0	5	0	1	1	X	7	9	0
Boxscore

== Play-offs ==
The winner of the final and the repechage qualified for the 2025 finals.

=== Bracket ===
Final
14 July – Prime Ministers’ Park
New Zealand	5
Argentina	6
Third place play-off
14 July – Prime Ministers’ Park
Singapore	0
Canada	8

Repechage
14 July – Prime Ministers’ Park
Canada	1
New Zealand	4

=== Summary ===
Round	Date	Local Time	Road team	Score	Home team	Inn.	Venue	Game duration	Attendance	Boxscore
5th place match	14 July 2024	10:00	Israel	5–6	Hong Kong, China	7	Prime Ministers’ Park			Boxscore
3rd place match	14 July 2024	13:00	Singapore	0–8	Canada	5	Prime Ministers’ Park			Boxscore
Final	14 July 2024	16:00	New Zealand	5–6	Argentina	7	Prime Ministers’ Park			Boxscore
Repechage	14 July 2024	19:00	Canada	1–4	New Zealand	7	Prime Ministers’ Park			Boxscore

=== Fifth place play-off ===
14 July 2024 10:00 Prime Ministers’ Park
Team	1	2	3	4	5	6	7	R	H	E
Israel	0	0	0	1	3	1	0	5	6	2
Hong Kong	0	0	4	2	0	0	X	6	7	4
Boxscore

=== Third place play-off ===
10 July 2024 13:00 Prime Ministers’ Park
Team	1	2	3	4	5	6	7	R	H	E
Singapore	0	0	0	0	0	X	X	0	0	1
Canada (5)	5	2	0	1	X	X	X	8	10	0
Boxscore

=== Final ===
10 July 2024 16:00 Prime Ministers’ Park
Team	1	2	3	4	5	6	7	R	H	E
New Zealand	0	0	0	4	0	1	0	5	9	1
Argentina	1	0	0	3	1	1	X	6	5	0
Boxscore

=== Repechage ===
14 July 2024 19:00 Prime Ministers’ Park
Team	1	2	3	4	5	6	7	R	H	E
Canada	1	0	0	0	0	0	0	1	3	1
New Zealand	0	0	0	1	0	3	X	4	5	0
Boxscore

== See also ==
- 2025 Men's Softball World Cup Group A
- 2025 Men's Softball World Cup Group C
- 2025 Men's Softball World Cup Finals
