= 2025 Men's Softball World Cup Group C =

Group C of the 2025 Men's Softball World Cup took place from 17 to 21 September 2024 in Oklahoma City, United States. The group consisted of host nation United States, Japan, Guatemala, Colombia, South Africa and the Netherlands. The United States went undefeated, including four run-rule victories, to win the group and advance to the finals in Canada in 2025.

== Standings ==
Group C was contested in Oklahoma City during 17-21 September 2024.

Pos	Team	Pld	W	L	RF	RA	RD	PCT	GB	Qualification
1	United States (H)	5	5	0	41	9	+32	1.000	—	Advance to Group C Final
2	Japan	5	4	1	35	10	+25	.800	1	Advance to Group C Final
3	Guatemala	5	3	2	23	16	+7	.600	2	Advance to Group C third place play-off
4	Colombia	5	2	3	13	20	−7	.400	3	Advance to Group C third place play-off
5	Netherlands	5	1	4	9	41	−32	.200	4	
6	South Africa	5	0	5	8	33	−25	.000	5	

Source: WBSC
Rules for classification: 1) Wins/losses; 2) Head-to-head record; 3) TQB; 4) ER-TQB; 5) Highest batting average; 6) Coin toss
(H) Hosts

== Summary ==
Date	Local time	Road team	Score	Home team	Inn.	Venue	Game duration	Attendance	Boxscore
17 September 2024	13:00	Guatemala	4–0	South Africa	7	USA Softball Hall of Fame Complex			Boxscore
17 September 2024	16:00	Netherlands	0–9	Japan	6	USA Softball Hall of Fame Complex			Boxscore
17 September 2024	19:00	Colombia	0–3	United States	7	USA Softball Hall of Fame Complex			Boxscore
18 September 2024	10:00	Japan	9–0	South Africa	5	USA Softball Hall of Fame Complex			Boxscore
18 September 2024	13:00	South Africa	0–3	Colombia	7	USA Softball Hall of Fame Complex			Boxscore
18 September 2024	16:00	United States	7–0	Guatemala	5	USA Softball Hall of Fame Complex			Boxscore
18 September 2024	19:00	United States	11–0	Netherlands	5	USA Softball Hall of Fame Complex			Boxscore
19 September 2024	10:00	Colombia	2–9	Guatemala	6	USA Softball Hall of Fame Complex			Boxscore
19 September 2024	13:00	Netherlands	0–7	Colombia	5	USA Softball Hall of Fame Complex			Boxscore
19 September 2024	16:00	South Africa	4–6	Netherlands	7	USA Softball Hall of Fame Complex			Boxscore
19 September 2024	19:00	Japan	5–9	United States	7	USA Softball Hall of Fame Complex			Boxscore
20 September 2024	10:00	Netherlands	3–10	Guatemala	6	USA Softball Hall of Fame Complex			Boxscore
20 September 2024	13:00	Guatemala	0–4	Japan	7	USA Softball Hall of Fame Complex			Boxscore
20 September 2024	16:00	Colombia	1–8	Japan	5	USA Softball Hall of Fame Complex			Boxscore
20 September 2024	19:00	South Africa	4–11	United States	6	USA Softball Hall of Fame Complex			Boxscore

== Matches ==
=== Guatemala vs. South Africa ===
17 September 2024 13:00 USA Softball Hall of Fame Complex
Team	1	2	3	4	5	6	7	R	H	E
Guatemala	0	0	1	1	1	0	1	4	8	1
South Africa	0	0	0	0	0	0	0	0	1	1
WP: Segura Bonilla LP: Kekana; Boxscore

=== Netherlands vs Japan ===
17 September 2024 16:00 USA Softball Hall of Fame Complex
Team	1	2	3	4	5	6	7	R	H	E
Netherlands	0	0	0	0	0	0	X	0	3	1
Japan	3	0	0	2	0	4	X	9	7	0
WP: Onondera LP: Lourens Sv: Inoue; Boxscore

=== Colombia vs. United States ===
17 September 2024 19:00 USA Softball Hall of Fame Complex
Team	1	2	3	4	5	6	7	R	H	E
Colombia	0	0	0	0	0	0	0	0	2	0
United States	0	1	1	1	0	0	X	3	4	0
WP: Diaz LP: Chinchilla; Boxscore

=== Japan vs. South Africa ===
18 September 2024 10:00 USA Softball Hall of Fame Complex
Team	1	2	3	4	5	6	7	R	H	E
Japan	2	3	0	0	4	X	X	9	12	0
South Africa	0	0	0	0	0	X	X	0	2	1
WP: Onodera LP: Ledwaba; Boxscore

=== South Africa vs. Colombia ===
18 September 2024 13:00 USA Softball Hall of Fame Complex
Team	1	2	3	4	5	6	7	R	H	E
South Africa	0	0	0	0	0	0	0	0	1	3
Colombia	0	0	1	0	0	2	X	3	4	1
WP: Escorcia Martinez LP: Aphane; Boxscore

=== United States vs. Guatemala ===
18 September 2024 16:00 USA Softball Hall of Fame Complex
Team	1	2	3	4	5	6	7	R	H	E
United States	0	3	0	2	2	X	X	7	9	0
Guatemala	0	0	0	0	0	X	X	0	2	1
WP: Diaz LP: Morales; Boxscore

=== United States vs. Netherlands ===
18 September 2024 19:00 USA Softball Hall of Fame Complex
Team	1	2	3	4	5	6	7	R	H	E
United States	1	2	1	2	5	X	X	11	17	0
Netherlands	0	0	0	0	0	X	X	0	3	0
WP: Gibbons LP: Meyers; Boxscore

=== Colombia vs. Guatemala ===
19 September 2024 10:00 USA Softball Hall of Fame Complex
Team	1	2	3	4	5	6	7	R	H	E
Colombia	0	0	0	0	2	0	X	2	4	0
Guatemala	2	0	0	2	4	1	X	9	8	0
WP: Segura Bonilla LP: Chinchilla; Boxscore

=== Netherlands vs. Colombia ===
19 September 2024 13:00 USA Softball Hall of Fame Complex
Team	1	2	3	4	5	6	7	R	H	E
Netherlands	0	0	0	0	0	X	X	0	1	1
Colombia	2	0	5	0	X	X	X	7	6	0
WP: Escorcia Martinez LP: Lourens; Boxscore

=== South Africa vs. Netherlands ===
19 September 2024 16:00 USA Softball Hall of Fame Complex
Team	1	2	3	4	5	6	7	R	H	E
South Africa	1	1	1	0	0	1	0	4	6	2
Netherlands	1	0	0	0	0	5	X	6	6	1
WP: Meyers LP: Kekana; Boxscore

=== Japan vs. United States ===
19 September 2024 19:00 USA Softball Hall of Fame Complex
Team	1	2	3	4	5	6	7	R	H	E
Japan	1	3	0	0	0	0	1	5	11	2
United States	2	3	1	3	0	0	X	9	12	1
WP: Diaz LP: Nagai; Boxscore

=== Netherlands vs. Guatemala ===
20 September 2024 10:00 USA Softball Hall of Fame Complex
Team	1	2	3	4	5	6	7	R	H	E
Netherlands	0	1	1	1	0	0	X	3	6	1
Guatemala	0	1	4	0	4	1	X	10	12	2
WP: Segura Bonilla LP: Thompson; Boxscore

=== Guatemala vs. Japan ===
20 September 2024 13:00 USA Softball Hall of Fame Complex
Team	1	2	3	4	5	6	7	R	H	E
Guatemala	0	0	0	0	0	0	0	0	4	0
Japan	0	1	0	1	0	2	X	4	4	0
WP: Ikeda LP: Segura Bonilla; Boxscore

=== Colombia vs. Japan ===
20 September 2024 16:00 USA Softball Hall of Fame Complex
Team	1	2	3	4	5	6	7	R	H	E
Colombia	1	0	0	0	0	X	X	1	8	0
Japan	3	0	3	0	2	X	X	8	7	0
WP: Onondera LP: Prato; Boxscore

=== South Africa vs. United States ===
20 September 2024 19:00 USA Softball Hall of Fame Complex
Team	1	2	3	4	5	6	7	R	H	E
South Africa	0	0	0	4	0	0	X	4	7	1
United States	2	4	0	2	2	1	X	11	13	0
WP: Gwizdala LP: Lamola; Boxscore

== Play-offs ==
The winner of the final and the repechage qualify for the 2025 finals.

=== Bracket ===
Final
21 September – USA Softball Hall of Fame Complex
Japan	0
United States	10
Third place play-off
21 September – USA Softball Hall of Fame Complex
Colombia	2
Guatemala	3

Repechage
21 September – USA Softball Hall of Fame Complex
Guatemala	0
Japan	3

=== Summary ===
Round	Date	Local Time	Road team	Score	Home team	Inn.	Venue	Game duration	Attendance	Boxscore
5th place match	21 September 2024	10:00	South Africa	8–4	Netherlands	7	USA Softball Hall of Fame Complex			Boxscore
3rd place match	21 September 2024	13:00	Colombia	2–3	Guatemala	7	USA Softball Hall of Fame Complex			Boxscore
Final	21 September 2024	16:00	Japan	0–10	United States	4	USA Softball Hall of Fame Complex			Boxscore
Repechage	21 September 2024	19:00	Guatemala	0–3	Japan	7	USA Softball Hall of Fame Complex			Boxscore

=== Fifth place play-off ===
21 September 2024 10:00 USA Softball Hall of Fame Complex
Team	1	2	3	4	5	6	7	R	H	E
South Africa	0	6	0	0	0	2	0	8	12	0
Netherlands	4	0	0	0	0	0	0	4	6	4
WP: Aphane LP: Meyers; Boxscore

=== Third place play-off ===
21 September 2024 13:00 USA Softball Hall of Fame Complex
Team	1	2	3	4	5	6	7	R	H	E
Colombia	0	0	0	2	0	0	0	2	5	0
Guatemala	0	0	1	0	1	1	X	3	6	1
WP: Segura Bonilla LP: Chinchilla; Boxscore

=== Final ===
21 September 2024 16:00 USA Softball Hall of Fame Complex
Team	1	2	3	4	5	6	7	R	H	E
Japan	0	0	0	0	X	X	X	0	3	0
United States	9	0	1	X	X	X	X	10	7	0
WP: Diaz LP: Ikeda; Boxscore

=== Repechage ===
21 September 2024 19:00 USA Softball Hall of Fame Complex
Team	1	2	3	4	5	6	7	R	H	E
Guatemala	0	0	0	0	0	0	0	0	3	2
Japan	0	0	0	3	0	0	X	3	3	1
WP: Ikeda LP: Segura Bonilla; Boxscore

== See also ==
- 2025 Men's Softball World Cup Group A
- 2025 Men's Softball World Cup Group B
- 2025 Men's Softball World Cup Finals
