= New Zealand men's national softball team =

New Zealand national softball team

Information
- Country: New Zealand
- Federation: Softball New Zealand
- Confederation: WBSC Oceania
- Manager: Thomas Makea
- WBSC World Rank: 7 (14 May 2026)

Men's Softball World Cup
- Appearances: 17 (First in 1966)
- Best result: (gold) 1st (7 times, most recent in 2017)

The New Zealand men's national softball team (nicknamed the Black Sox/Black Socks) is the national softball team for New Zealand. They have won the ISF Men's World Championship seven times, becoming World Champions in 1976 (1st = with US and Canada), 1984, 1996, 2000, 2004, 2013 and 2017. They also won the inaugural Commonwealth Championships (a round robin tournament between New Zealand, Australia, Samoa, South Africa and Botswana) in 2006. The "Black Sox" name is one of many national team nicknames related to the All Blacks as well as to famous "Sox" baseball teams. The female team is known as the White Sox

On 16 July 2017, New Zealand (Black Sox) defeated Australia (Aussie Steelers), six runs to four in the final of the 2017 ISF Men's World Championship held in Canada.

== Results and fixtures ==
The following is a list of match results in the last 12 months, as well as any future matches that have been scheduled.

Win Draw Loss Fixture

=== 2024 ===
2025 WC Group B	10 July 2024	Singapore	0–2	New Zealand	Prime Ministers' Park, Prince Albert
2025 WC Group B	16:00	LP: Raynard Heng	Boxscore	WP: Liam Potts; HR: Ben Enoka	Attendance: 350

2025 WC Group B	11 July 2024	New Zealand	10–0 (F/4)	Israel	Prime Ministers' Park, Prince Albert
2025 WC Group B	10:00	WP: Thomas Enoka; HR: Hohepa Monk, Cole Evans, Pita Rona	Boxscore	LP: Seth Ross	Attendance: 200

2025 WC Group B	12 July 2024	New Zealand	5–1	Canada	Prime Ministers' Park, Prince Albert
2025 WC Group B	21:00	WP: Pita Rona; HR: Tyron Bartorillo, Beau Bishop, Cole Evans	Boxscore	LP: Ty Sebastian	Attendance: 2,000

2025 WC Group B	13 July 2024	Argentina	4–1	New Zealand	Prime Ministers' Park, Prince Albert
2025 WC Group B	13:00	WP: Martín Gonzalez; HR: Manuel Godoy	Boxscore	LP: Liam Potts; HR: Cole Evans	Attendance: 650

2025 WC Group B	13 July 2024	Hong Kong	0–12 (F/4)	New Zealand	Prime Ministers' Park, Prince Albert
2025 WC Group B	18:00	LP: Hok Wong	Boxscore	WP: Daniel Champman; HR: Reilly Makea 2, Beau Bishop, Cameron Watts	Attendance: 180

2025 WC Group B Final	14 July 2024	New Zealand	5–6	Argentina	Prime Ministers' Park, Prince Albert
2025 WC Group B Final	16:00	LP: Daniel Chapman; HR: Beau Bishop	Boxscore	WP: Pablo Migliavacca Skladny; Sv: Martín Gonzalez; HR: Lucio Retamar	Attendance: 1,000

2025 WC Group B Repechage	14 July 2024	Canada	1–4	New Zealand	Prime Ministers' Park, Prince Albert
2025 WC Group B Repechage	19:00	LP: Ty Sebastian; HR: Mathieu Roy	Boxscore	WP: Pita Rona; HR: Ben Enoka	Attendance: 950

Friendly	2 December 2024	New Zealand	9–10	Australia	Hawker Softball Centre, Canberra
Friendly	13:00		Boxscore

Friendly	2 December 2024	New Zealand	8–5	Australia	Hawker Softball Centre, Canberra
Friendly	15:00		Boxscore

Friendly	2 December 2024	New Zealand	1–11 (F/5)	Australia	Hawker Softball Centre, Canberra
Friendly	19:00		Boxscore

=== 2025 ===
2025 WC Finals	8 July 2025	New Zealand	Canada	Prime Ministers' Park, Prince Albert
2025 WC Finals	20:30

2025 WC Finals	9 July 2025	New Zealand	Argentina	Prime Ministers' Park, Prince Albert
2025 WC Finals	20:30

2025 WC Finals	10 July 2025	Venezuela	New Zealand	Prime Ministers' Park, Prince Albert
2025 WC Finals	14:30

== Players ==
=== Current squad ===
The following players were called up for the 2023 Men's Softball Oceania Championship in American Samoa for the 2025 Softball World Cup.

2023 Men's Softball Oceania Championship – New Zealand roster
Players		Coaches
Pitchers: 12 Floyd Nola; 73 Eruera Drage	Catchers: 6 Jayden Stratford-Long; 7 Cameron Watts; Infielders: 18 Pita Rona; 27 Tane Mumu; 33 Liam Potts; 47 Cole Evans (captain); Outfielders: 10 Te Kirika Cooper-Nicola; 24 Jackson Watt; 99 Reilly Makea; Utility: 5 Callum Bishop; 9 Hohepa Monk; 20 Zachary Boyd; 29 Wayne Laulu	Manager: Thomas Makea; Coaches: Steven Deans (Coach)

== Competitive record ==
=== Men's Softball World Cup ===
Men's Softball World Cup record
Year	Host	Round	Pos	Pld	W	L	RF	RA	Squad
1966	Mexico	Third place	3rd	13	10	3			
1968	United States	Round robin	5th	9	5	4			
1972	Philippines	Third place	3rd	13	7	6			
1976	New Zealand	Champions	3rd	13	10	3			
1980	United States	Fourth place	4th	9	6	3			
1984	United States	Champions	1st	10	9	1			
1988	Canada	Runners-up	2nd	17	14	3			
1992	Philippines	Runners-up	2nd	15	11	4			
1996	United States	Champions	1st	14	14	0			
2000	South Africa	Champions	1st	15	14	1			
2004	New Zealand	Champions	1st	10	9	1			
2009	Canada	Runners-up	2nd	11	9	2	106	26	
2013	New Zealand	Champions	1st	10	9	1	54	17	
2015	Canada	Runners-up	2nd	10	7	3	70	25	
2017	Canada	Champions	1st	10	9	1	79	13	
2019	Czech Republic	Fourth place	4th	10	5	5	51	24	
2022	New Zealand	Placement round	8th	8	4	4	29	28	Squad
2025	Qualified								
Total		7 titles	17/17	196	152	45	389	133	—

=== Men's Softball Oceania Championship ===
Men's Softball Oceania Championship record
Year	Host	Round	Pos	Pld	W	L	RF	RA	Squad
2023	American Samoa	Runners-up	2nd	6	4	2	56	21	Squad
Total		Runners-up	1/1	6	4	2	56	21	—

== Honours ==
- Men's Softball World Cup
  - Champions (7): 1976, 1984, 1996, 2000, 2004, 2013, 2017
  - Runners-up (4): 1988, 1992, 2009, 2015
  - Third place (2): 1966, 1972
- Men's Softball Oceania Championship
  - Runners-up (1): 2023
