= ISF Men's Fastpitch World Championship =

- Most recent season or competition: 2007 ISF Men's Fastpitch World Cup
- Sport: Softball
- Founded: 2007
- No. of teams: 8 (Finals)
- Continent: International
- Most recent champion: Japan

The ISF Men's Fastpitch World Cup is a fastpitch softball tournament for men's national teams and men's club teams held by the International Softball Federation (ISF).

== Results ==
Year	Final Host	Medalists			
Year	Final Host	Champions	Final score	Runners-up	3rd place
2007; Details	(Czech Republic); Prague	Japan	2 – 0	United States	Venezuela

=== Medal table ===
Rank	Nation	Gold	Silver	Bronze	Total
1	Japan	1	0	0	1
2	United States	0	1	0	1
3	Venezuela	0	0	1	1
Totals (3 entries)		1	1	1	3
