= Men's Softball South American Championship =

- Sport: Softball
- Continent: South America
- Most recent champion: Argentina

The Men's Softball South American Championship is the main championship tournament between national men softball teams in South America, governed by the Pan American Softball Confederation (CONPASA).

== Results ==
Year	Host	Final		Semifinalists	
Year	Host	Champions	Runners-up	3rd place	4th place
2015	(Colombia); Bogotá	Panama	Colombia	Aruba	Ecuador
2016	Panama City	Argentina	Venezuela	Panama-A	Colombia
2018	(Colombia); Monteria	Venezuela	Argentina	Dominican Republic	Colombia

=== Medal table ===
Rank	Nation	Gold	Silver	Bronze	Total
1	Argentina	1	1	0	2
1	Venezuela	1	1	0	2
3	Panama	1	0	1	2
4	Colombia	0	1	0	1
5	Aruba	0	0	1	1
5	Dominican Republic	0	0	1	1
Totals (6 entries)		3	3	3	9

=== Participating nations ===
Nation	(Colombia) 2015	(Panama) 2016	(Colombia) 2018	Years
Argentina	5th	1st	2nd	3
Argentina Junior	-	7th	5th	2
Aruba	3rd	6th	9th	3
Brazil	-	-	11th	1
Colombia	2nd	4th	4th	3
Cuba	-	-	6th	1
Dominican Republic	-	-	3rd	1
Ecuador	4th	8th	7th	3
Panama	1st	3rd	8th	3
Panama-B	-	5th	-	1
Peru	-	9th	10th	2
Venezuela	-	2nd	1st	2
Total	5	9	11	
