= 1976 Men's Softball World Championship =

Tournament details
- Host country: New Zealand
- Dates: 31 January to 8 February 1976
- Teams: 7
- Defending champions: Canada

Final positions
- Champions: United States; Canada; New Zealand
- Fourth place: Japan

The 1976 ISF Men's World Championship was an international softball tournament. The tournament was held at the Hutt Recreation Ground in Lower Hutt, New Zealand. It was the fourth time the World Championship took place and the first time New Zealand was to host the tournament. Seven nations competed, including defending champions Canada.

The tournament was controversial due to the participation of Apartheid era South Africa. Prior to its start, an opponent to South Africa's involvement, planted an incendiary bomb in the middle of the ground's softball diamond which exploded and damaged a 10 metre radius. Several Lower Hutt City Council members, led by councillor John Seddon, unsuccessfully tried to block the South African team playing in the tournament. Both the Philippines and Mexico boycotted in protest of South Africa competing in the tournament which led the International Softball Federation (ISF) to suspend both countries membership for refusing to compete.

According to Filipino United Nations official Nicasio Valderrama other participating nations sent "unrepresentative teams" as their national squads for the tournament. The Ambassador of Canada and Japan to New Zealand has declared their respective sides as not national teams.

== Final standings ==
Rk	Team	W	L
1st place, gold medalist(s)	United States	12	2
1st place, gold medalist(s)	Canada	11	3
1st place, gold medalist(s)	New Zealand	10	3
4	Japan	6	8
Failed to qualify for Playoffs
5	Taiwan	3	9
6	Guam	2	10
7	South Africa	1	11

The United States, Canada and New Zealand were declared joint winners of the championship after rain washed out the remainder of the final playoffs.
