= Men's Softball Oceania Championship =

WBSC Oceania softball tournament for men's national teams

- Current season, competition or edition: 2023 Men's Softball Oceania Championship
- Sport: Softball
- Founded: 2023; 3 years ago
- Organizing body: WBSC Oceania
- No. of teams: 3
- Continent: Oceania
- Most recent champion: Australia (1st title)
- Most titles: Australia (1 title)

The Men's Softball Oceania Championship is an international softball tournament held among the WBSC Oceania member nations. Established in 2023, it also acts as a qualifier for the Men's Softball World Cup.

== History ==
This first edition is to be hosted as a round-robin competition in Pago Pago, American Samoa. The tournament will be contested by just three nations; Australia, New Zealand, and hosts American Samoa.

== Results ==
Ed.	Year	Host	Final			Third Place Match or losing semi-finalists			Number of teams
Ed.	Year	Host	(gold) Champion	Score and Venue	(silver) Runner-up	(bronze) Third place	Score and Venue	Fourth place	Number of teams
1	2023	American Samoa	Australia	Round robin	New Zealand	American Samoa	Round robin	Only 3 teams	3

=== Medal table ===
Rank	Nation	Gold	Silver	Bronze	Total
1	Australia	1	0	0	1
2	New Zealand	0	1	0	1
3	American Samoa	0	0	1	1
Totals (3 entries)		1	1	1	3

== Participating nations ==
- 1st — Champion
- 2nd — Runner-up
- 3rd — Third place
- # — Position
- × — Withdrew
- — Hosts

Teams	2023	Years
American Samoa	3rd	1
Australia	1st	1
New Zealand	2nd	1
No. of Teams	3	
