= New Zealand national softball team =

New Zealand national softball team may refer to:

- New Zealand men's national softball team
- New Zealand women's national softball team
