= 1966 Men's Softball World Championship =

Tournament details
- Host country: Mexico
- Teams: 11

Final positions
- Champions: United States (1st title)
- Runner-up: Mexico
- Third place: New Zealand
- Fourth place: Puerto Rico

The 1966 ISF Men's World Championship was an international softball tournament and the inaugural World Championship. The tournament was held in Mexico City, Mexico from 23 October to 1 November 1966. Eleven nations competed.

== Final standings ==
Rk	Team	W	L
1st place, gold medalist(s)	United States	12	0
2nd place, silver medalist(s)	Mexico	9	3
3rd place, bronze medalist(s)	New Zealand	10	3
4	Puerto Rico	7	6
Failed to qualify for Playoffs
5	Venezuela	5	5
6	Bahamas	5	5
7	Japan	3	7
8	Dominican Republic	3	7
9	Canada	3	7
10	El Salvador	2	8
11	Nicaragua	1	9
