= South American Championship =

A South American Championship is a top level continental sports competition between South American athletes or sports teams representing their respective countries or professional sports clubs.

== List of South American championships ==
- Basketball
  - South American Basketball Championship
  - South American Women's Basketball Championship
  - FIBA U17 South American Championship
  - FIBA U15 South American Championship
  - FIBA U17 Women's South American Championship
  - FIBA U15 Women's South American Championship
- Football
  - Copa América, a football competition formerly known as South American Championship
  - Copa América Femenina
  - South American Youth Football Championship
  - South American U-17 Championship
  - South American U-15 Championship
  - South American U-20 Women's Championship
  - South American Under-17 Women's Football Championship
- Hockey
  - Men's South American Hockey Championship
  - Women's South American Hockey Championship
- Softball
  - Men's Softball South American Championship
  - Women's Softball South American Championship
- Volleyball
  - Men's South American Volleyball Championship
  - Women's South American Volleyball Championship
  - South American Men's Volleyball Club Championship
- South American Championships in Athletics
- South American Badminton Championships
- South American Baseball Championship
- South American Chess Championship
- South American Cricket Championship
- South American Gymnastics Championships
- South American Rugby Championship
- Snipe South American Championship, a sailing competition.
- Soling South American Championship
- South American Swimming Championships
- South American Championships (tennis)

== See also ==
- African Championship
- Asian Championship
- European Championship
- Pan American Championship
  - North American Championship
  - Canadian Championships
- Oceania Championship
