= Bermuda men's national softball team =

Bermuda men's national softball team is the national team for Bermuda. The 1988 World Championships were held in Saskatoon, Canada. The team played 13 games in the round robin round. They finished thirteenth overall.
