= Pakistan men's national softball team =

The Pakistan men's national softball team is the men's national softball team of Pakistan. The team competed at the 1996 ISF Men's World Championship in Midland, Michigan where they finished with 0 wins and 10 losses.
