= Softball South Africa =

Sport governing body

- Sport: Softball
- Jurisdiction: South Africa
- Abbreviation: SSA
- Founded: 1994
- Affiliation: World Baseball Softball Confederation
- Regional affiliation: African Baseball & Softball Association
- President: Mashilo Matsetela
- Secretary: Cynthia Nthuping

Official website
- www.softballsouthafrica.co.za
- (South Africa)

Softball South Africa (SSA) is the national governing body for softball in South Africa. Softball South Africa is responsible for the promotion and development of softball in South Africa. Softball South Africa is affiliated with the world governing body World Baseball Softball Confederation, and is responsible for the administration of the men's and women's national softball teams. SSA is also affiliated with SASCOC.

SSA organises competitions such as National Provincial Championships, and is also responsible for developing softball at all levels from primary and secondary schools, universities and to the elite level.

== History ==
Softball as a sport began in South Africa around 1946, it started mainly as a women's game but the first national women's team was only assembled in 1959. South African Softball Union (SASU) was the first multiracial governing body that was established on 22 February 1977, as a result of the suspension of the South African Softball Association (established in 1949) from international competitions in 1975 by the world body International Softball Federation due to the government's racial discrimination policies, but the union was short-lived. The men's game started in 1947 with the teams playing fast-pitch softball and the sport became very popular in South Africa around the 1950s and 1960s, with Transvaal Province alone having over 250 softball teams

Softball South Africa is a product of the unification discussions between three racially divided softball associations of the apartheid-era namely – South African Softball Association (SASA) that was aligned with the Confederation of South African Sport (COSAS), South African Softball Federation (SASF), and the non-racial South African Council of Sport (SACOS) affiliated South African Softball Association (SASA (SACOS)) that started in 1991. Disagreements leading to walk-outs occurred during deliberations in 1992 before consensus was reached on the regional structures, leading to the establishment of Softball South Africa late in 1992. Subsequent disagreements during the years following unification led to intervention from the National Olympic Committee in 1994 requiring the establishment of an interim body named as Initial Management Committee, leading to the elections of officials in October 1994.

== National teams ==
- South Africa men's national softball team
- South Africa men's junior national softball team
- South Africa women's national softball team
- South Africa women's junior national softball team

== See also ==
- Sport in South Africa
- International Softball Federation
- World Baseball Softball Confederation
