= Russia men's national softball team =

The Russia men's national softball team is the men's national softball team of Russia. The team competed at the 1996 ISF Men's World Championship in Midland, Michigan where they finished with 1 win and 9 losses.

Due to the Russian invasion of Ukraine, the World Baseball Softball Confederation banned Russian athletes and officials.
