= South Korea men's national softball team =

The South Korea men's national softball team is the men's national softball team of South Korea. The team competed at the 1996 ISF Men's World Championship in Midland, Michigan where they finished with 2 wins and 8 losses.
