= Papua New Guinea men's national softball team =

The Papua New Guinea men's national softball team is the team that represents the nation of Papua New Guinea at the sport of softball. The team competed at the 1996 ISF Men's World Championship in Midland, Michigan where they finished with 1 win and 9 losses. For the 2008 ISF Men's Regional World Championship Qualifier, the country had to play Australia during the qualifiers. Australia beat Papua New Guinea 8–0, and 5–0.
