= British Virgin Islands men's national softball team =

The British Virgin Islands men's national softball team is the national team for the British Virgin Islands. The 1988 World Championships were held in Saskatoon, Canada. The team played 13 games in the round robin round, finishing twelfth overall.
