= Men's Softball World Cup =

International softball tournament

- Current season, competition or edition: 2025 Men's Softball World Cup
- Sport: Softball
- Founded: 1966; 60 years ago
- No. of teams: 12 (Finals)
- Continent: International
- Most recent champions: Venezuela (1st title) (2025)
- Most titles: New Zealand (7 titles)

The Men's Softball World Cup, known through 2015 as the ISF Men's World Championship, is a softball tournament for the best national men's teams in the world. From 1966 to 2013 it was held every four years, first by the International Softball Federation (ISF) and from 2019 an onward it is held every two years by the World Baseball Softball Confederation (WBSC), the 16 best teams in the world compete.

== Classification ==
With the approved format of 18 national teams, the WBSC has distributed the continental quotas as follows:

- WBSC Africa: 2 spots
- WBSC Americas: 5 spots
- WBSC Asia: 3 spots
- WBSC Europe: 3 spots
- WBSC Oceania: 2 spots
- Wild cards: 3 spots (including hosts if necessary)

The participants will be determined through the continental championships.

== Results ==
Ed.	Years	Final hosts	Finalists			Semi-finalists			Teams
Ed.	Years	Final hosts	Champions	Score	Runners-up	3rd place	Score	4th place	Teams
1	1966; Details	Mexico City	United States	6 – 0	Mexico	New Zealand		Puerto Rico	11
2	1968; Details	(United States); Oklahoma City	United States	4 – 0	Canada	Mexico		Philippines	10
3	1972; Details	(Philippines); Marikina	Canada	1 – 0	United States	New Zealand		Mexico	10
4	1976; Details	(New Zealand); Lower Hutt	United States Canada New Zealand	–				Japan	7
5	1980; Details	(United States); Tacoma	United States	3 – 0	Canada	Bahamas		New Zealand	14
6	1984; Details	(United States); Midland	New Zealand	3 – 1	Canada	United States		Chinese Taipei	16
7	1988; Details	(Canada); Saskatoon	United States	4 – 0	New Zealand	Canada		Cuba	14
8	1992; Details	(Philippines); Manila/Pasig	Canada	5 – 3	New Zealand	United States		Japan	17
9	1996; Details	(United States); Midland	New Zealand	4 – 0	Canada	Japan		United States	22
10	2000; Details	(South Africa); East London	New Zealand	2 – 1	Japan	United States		Canada	16
11	2004; Details	(New Zealand); Christchurch	New Zealand	9 – 5	Canada	Australia		United States	15
12	2009; Details	(Canada); Saskatoon	Australia	5 – 0	New Zealand	Canada		United States	16
13	2013; Details	(New Zealand); Auckland	New Zealand	4 – 1	Venezuela	Australia		Argentina	16
14	2015; Details	(Canada); Saskatoon	Canada	10 – 5	New Zealand	Venezuela		Australia	15
15	2017; Details	(Canada); Whitehorse	New Zealand	6 – 4	Australia	Canada		Argentina	16
16	2019; Details	(Czech Republic); Prague/Havlíčkův Brod	Argentina	3 – 2	Japan	Canada	2 – 1	New Zealand	16
17	2022; Details	(New Zealand); Auckland	Australia	5 – 2	Canada	United States	2 – 0	Argentina	12
18	2025; Details	(Canada); Prince Albert	Venezuela	3 – 0	New Zealand	United States	10 – 1	Japan	18

In 1976 the final day was rained out. New Zealand, USA and Canada were all awarded the gold medal.

=== Medal table ===
Rank	Nation	Gold	Silver	Bronze	Total
1	New Zealand	7	5	2	14
2	United States	5	1	5	11
3	Canada	4	6	4	14
4	Australia	2	1	2	5
5	Venezuela	1	1	1	3
6	Argentina	1	0	0	1
7	Japan	0	2	1	3
8	Mexico	0	1	1	2
9	Bahamas	0	0	1	1
Totals (9 entries)		20	17	17	54

== Participating nations ==
- 1st — Champion
- 2nd — Runner-up
- 3rd — Third place
- GS — Group Stage

Teams	1966	1968	1972	1976	1980	1984	1988	1992	1996	2000	2004	2009	2013	2015	2017	2019	2022	2025	Years
Argentina					12th	9th		6th	9th		8th	7th	4th	7th	4th	1st	4th	6th	12
Australia							7th	5th	7th	12th	3rd	1st	3rd	4th	2nd	7th	1st	7th	12
Bahamas	6th	7th			3rd	8th	6th		10th										6
Bermuda						15th	13th												2
British Virgin Islands							12th												1
Botswana						14th		10th	18th	9th	13th	13th			8th	14th			8
Canada	9th	2nd	1st	1st	2nd	2nd	3rd	1st	2nd	4th	2nd	3rd	5th	1st	3rd	3rd	2nd	5th	18
Chinese Taipei			8th	5th	6th	4th	11th	9th	14th	15th									8
Colombia													10th					10th	2
Cuba							4th									10th	5th		3
Czech Republic								12th	12th	6th	7th	9th	11th	8th	9th	8th	9th	17th	11
Denmark							14th		15th	13th		11th		14th	12th	9th	12th		8
Dominican Republic	8th				11th	5th				7th				5th	11th			8th	7
El Salvador	10th																		1
Great Britain											9th	8th	9th	11th	13th				5
Guam			7th	6th	8th	10th		16th											5
Guatemala														12th				9th	2
Hong Kong			10th			16th		14th			15th				14th			14th	6
India																15th			1
Indonesia								11th				16th	16th						3
Israel									20th									15th	2
Japan	7th	10th	6th	4th	7th	6th	5th	4th	3rd	2nd	6th	6th	6th	6th	5th	2nd	7th	4th	18
South Korea									17th										1
Lesotho										16th									1
Mexico	2nd	3rd	4th		5th	12th	9th	8th	5th	11th		14th	13th	10th		11th		16th	14
Netherlands								9th	13th	14th	14th		14th	15th		13th		11th	8
Netherlands Antilles						11th													1
New Zealand	3rd	5th	3rd	1st	4th	1st	2nd	2nd	1st	1st	1st	2nd	1st	2nd	1st	4th	8th	2nd	18
Nicaragua	11th																		1
Northern Mariana Islands								13th	16th										2
Puerto Rico	4th	6th							11th			12th							4
Pakistan									22nd										1
Panama					9th	7th													2
Papua New Guinea					14th			17th	19th										3
Philippines		4th	5th				8th	7th		10th	10th	10th	15th	13th		16th	10th	18th	12
Russia									21st										1
Samoa											6th		7th						2
Singapore			9th					15th								15th		13th	4
South Africa		9th		7th	13th				8th	8th	12th	15th	12th		10th	12th	11th	12th	12
Turkey															16th				1
United States	1st	1st	2nd	1st	1st	3rd	1st	3rd	4th	3rd	4th	4th	8th	9th	6th	5th	3rd	3rd	18
U.S. Virgin Islands		8th			10th														2
Venezuela	5th								6th	5th	11th	5th	2nd	3rd	7th	6th	6th	1st	11
Zimbabwe						13th	10th												2
No. of Teams	11	10	10	7	14	16	14	17	22	16	15	16	16	15	16	16	12	18	

- Czech Republic has participated as Czechoslovakia in 1992.

== Records and statistics ==
All statistics are up to date to the end of the 2022 Men's Softball World Championship.

=== Individual ===
Highest batting average
0.647, Clark Bosh (Canada, 1988)
Most Stolen Bases
6, Brian Rothrock (United States, 1988); Marty Kernaghan (Canada, 1988)
Most Doubles
7, Bob McKinnon (Canada, 1988)
Most Triples
4, Redelio Cruz (Cuba, 1988); Mark Sorenson and Taifau Matai (New Zealand, 1996)
Most Home Runs
8, Brian Rothrock (United States, 1988); Marty Kernaghan (Canada, 1988)
Most Runs Scored
19, Marty Kernaghan (Canada, 1988)
Most Hits
21, Crestwell Pratt (Bahamas, 1988); Bob McKinnon (Canada, 1988)
Most RBI's
23, Brian Rothrock (United States, 1988)
Most Innings pitched
59, Ty Stofflet (United States, 1976)
Most strikeouts
98, Ty Stofflet (United States, 1976)
Most strikeouts in a single game
32, Ty Stofflet (United States, 1976)
Most consecutive scoreless innings
59, Ty Stofflet (United States, 1976)

=== Team ===
Highest batting average
0.404, Canada (1998)
Most Runs
142, Canada (1998)
Most RBI's
125, Canada (1998)
Most Home-Runs
37, Canada (1998)
Most Hits
142, United States (1998)
Lowest ERA
0.19, United States (1976)

== See also ==
- Women's Softball World Championship
