= Virgin Islands men's national softball team =

The Virgin Islands men's national softball team is the top men's softball team for the territory of the Virgin Island.

The 1988 World Championships were held in Saskatoon, Canada. The team played 13 games in the round robin round. Australia beat the Virgin Islands 11–1 in one game in this round.
