= Botswana men's national softball team =

Botswana men's national softball team is the national team for Botswana. The team competed at the 1992 ISF Men's World Championship in Manila, Philippines where they finished with 3 wins and 5 losses. The team competed at the 1996 ISF Men's World Championship in Midland, Michigan where they finished with 1 win and 9 losses. The team competed at the 2000 ISF Men's World Championship in East London, South Africa where they finished ninth. The team competed at the 2004 ISF Men's World Championship in Christchurch, New Zealand where they finished thirteenth. The team competed at the 2009 ISF Men's World Championship in Saskatoon, Saskatchewan where they finished thirteenth. In 2017 they finished eighth.
