= Great Britain men's national softball team =

National team for Great Britain

Great Britain men's national softball team is the national team for Great Britain. The team competed at the 2004 ISF Men's World Championship in Christchurch, New Zealand where they finished ninth. The team competed at the 2009 ISF Men's World Championship in Saskatoon, Saskatchewan where they finished eighth.
