= Israel men's national softball team =

The Israel men's national softball team is the men's national softball team of Israel. The team competed at the 1996 ISF Men's World Championship in Midland, Michigan where they finished with 1 win and 9 losses.
