= Netherlands men's national softball team =

The Netherlands men's national softball team is the men's national softball team of Netherlands. The team competed at the 1996 ISF Men's World Championship in Midland, Michigan where they finished with 5 wins and 5 losses. The team competed at the 2000 ISF Men's World Championship in East London, South Africa where they finished fourteenth. The team competed at the 2004 ISF Men's World Championship in Christchurch, New Zealand, where they finished fourteenth.
