= Denmark men's national softball team =

Denmark national softball team

Information
- Country: Denmark
- Federation: Danish Softball Association
- Confederation: WBSC Europe
- WBSC World Rank: 19 ▼1 (31 December 2025)

Men's Softball World Cup
- Appearances: 7 (First in 1988)
- Best result: 9th

Denmark men's national softball team has been competing internationally since 1985. The team's best result is winning the 2010 European Championship in Havlíčkův Brod in the Czech Republic.

The 1988 World Championships were held in Saskatoon, Canada. The team played 13 games in the round robin round. Australia beat Denmark 11–1 in one game in this round. The team competed at the 1996 ISF Men's World Championship in Midland, Michigan where they finished with 3 wins and 7 losses. The team competed at the 2000 ISF Men's World Championship in East London, South Africa where they finished thirteenth. The team competed at the 2009 ISF Men's World Championship in Saskatoon, Saskatchewan where they finished eleventh. The team competed at the 2015 ISF Men's World Championships in Saskatoon, Saskatchewan where they finished 13th. The team competed at the 2017 ISF Men's World Championships in Whitehorse, Yukon where they finished 12th. The team competed at the 2019 WBSC Men's World Championships in Prague, Czech Republic where they finished 9th.

== Achievements ==
- ESF Men's Championship: 1 gold, 8 silver and 2 bronze.
- ISF Men's World Championship: 1988, Saskatoon, Canada: nr. 14, 1996, Midland, USA: nr. 15, 2009, Saskatoon, Canada: nr. 11, 2015, Saskatoon, Canada: nr. 13, 2017, Whitehorse, Canada: nr. 12, 2019, Prague, Czech Republic: nr. 9
