= United States men's national softball team =

United States national softball team
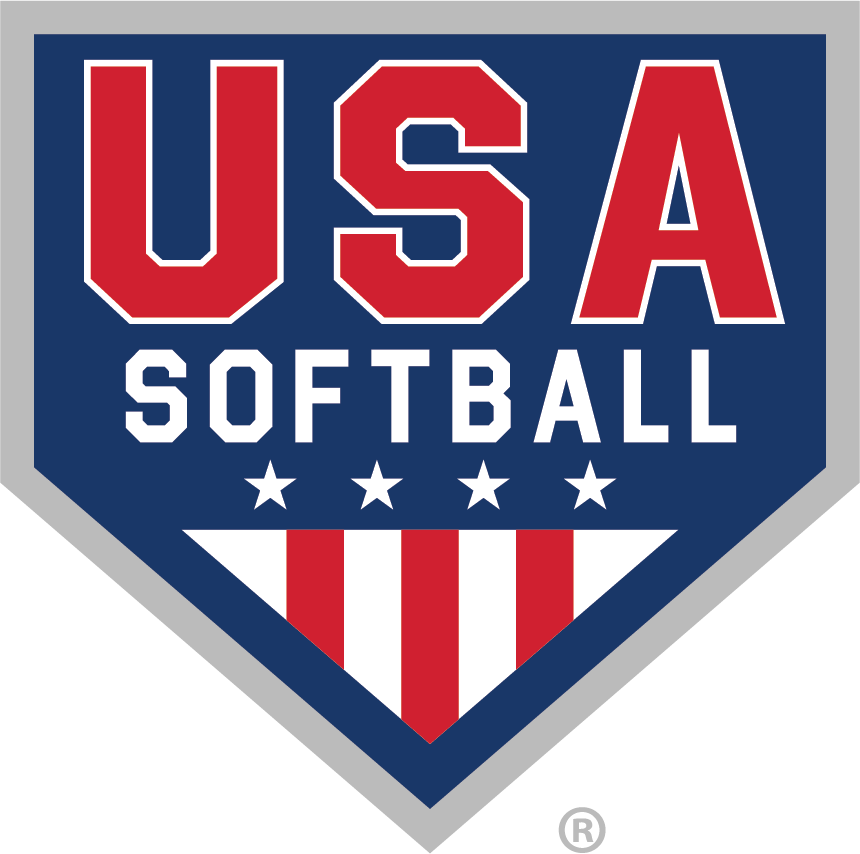

Information
- Country: United States
- Federation: USA Softball
- Confederation: WBSC Americas
- Manager: Ron Hackett
- WBSC World Rank: 4 ▲1 (14 May 2026)

Men's Softball World Cup
- Appearances: 18 (First in 1966)
- Best result: (gold) 1st (1966, 1968, 1976, 1980, 1988)

United States men's national softball team
Medal record

World Cup
Gold medal – first place	1966 Mexico City	
Gold medal – first place	1968 Oklahoma City	
Gold medal – first place	1976 Lower Hutt	
Gold medal – first place	1980 Tacoma	
Gold medal – first place	1988 Saskatoon	
Silver medal – second place	1972 Marikina	
Bronze medal – third place	1984 Midland	
Bronze medal – third place	1992 Manila & Pasig	
Bronze medal – third place	2000 East London	
Bronze medal – third place	2022 Auckland	
Bronze medal – third place	2025 Prince Albert	

World Games
Gold medal – first place	1981 Santa Clara	Team
Gold medal – first place	2025 Chengdu	Team
Silver medal – second place	1981 Santa Clara	Team

Pan American Games
Silver medal – second place	1979 San Juan	Team
Silver medal – second place	1983 Caracas	Team
Silver medal – second place	1987 Indianapolis	Team
Silver medal – second place	1991 Havana	Team
Silver medal – second place	1995 Mar del Plata	Team
Silver medal – second place	1999 Winnipeg	Team
Silver medal – second place	2003 Santo Domingo	Team
Silver medal – second place	2019 Lima	Team

United States men's national softball team is the national team for the United States. The 1988 World Championships were held in Saskatoon, Canada. The team played 13 games in the round robin round. The United States beat Australia 21–1 in one game in this round. The team competed at the 1992 ISF Men's World Championship in Manila, Philippines where they finished with 10 wins and 3 losses. The team competed at the 1996 ISF Men's World Championship in Midland, Michigan where they finished with 10 wins and 4 losses. The team competed at the 2000 ISF Men's World Championship in East London, South Africa where they finished third. The team competed at the 2004 ISF Men's World Championship in Christchurch, New Zealand, where they finished third. The team competed at the 2009 ISF Men's World Championship in Saskatoon, Saskatchewan where they finished fourth.

== Competitive record ==
=== World Cup ===
Year	Result	Position	Pld	W	L	%	RS	RA
(Mexico) 1966	Champions	1st	12	12	0	1.000		
(United States) 1968	Champions	1st						
(Philippines) 1972	Runners-up	2nd	15	11	4	.733		
(New Zealand) 1976	Champions	1st	14	12	2	.857		
(United States) 1980	Champions	1st						
(United States) 1984	Third place	3rd						
(Canada) 1988	Champions	1st						
(Philippines) 1992	Third place	3rd	10	9	1	.900		
(United States) 1996	Fourth Place	4th	14	10	4	.714		
(South Africa) 2000	Third place	3rd						
(New Zealand) 2004	Fourth Place	4th	9	7	2	.778		
(Canada) 2009	Fourth Place	4th	10	7	3	.700		
(New Zealand) 2013	Quarterfinals	8th	8	4	4	.500		
(Canada) 2015	Preliminary round	9th	10	7	3	.700	47	26
(Canada) 2017	Quarterfinals	6th	9	6	3	.667		
(Czech Republic) 2019	Fifth Place	5th	10	7	3	.700	53	36
(New Zealand) 2022	Third place	3rd	11	6	5	.545	49	36
(Canada) 2025	Third place	3rd	12	9	3	.750	94	27
Total	5 titles	18/18	—					

=== World Games ===
Year	Result	Position	Pld	W	L	%	RS	RA
(United States) 1981	Gold medal	1st	6	4	2	.667		
(United States) 1981	Silver medal	2nd	6	5	1	.833	22	9
(China) 2025	Gold medal	1st	4	4	0	1.000	42	8
Total	2 titles	2/2	16	13	3	.813	—	

=== Pan American Games ===
Year	Result	Position	Pld	W	L	%	RS	RA
(Puerto Rico) 1979	Silver medal	2nd						
(Venezuela) 1983	Silver medal	2nd						
(United States) 1987	Silver medal	2nd						
(Cuba) 1991	Silver medal	2nd						
(Argentina) 1995	Silver medal	2nd						
(Canada) 1999	Silver medal	2nd						
(Dominican Republic) 2003	Silver medal	2nd						
(Canada) 2015	Fourth Place	4th	6	2	4	.333	16	11
(Peru) 2019	Silver medal	2nd	8	5	3	.625	45	26
Total	0 title	9/9	—					
