= Czech Republic men's national softball team =

Czech Republic national softball team

Information
- Country: Czech Republic
- Federation: Czech Softball
- Confederation: WBSC Europe
- WBSC World Rank: 9 ▼1 (31 December 2025)

Men's Softball World Cup
- Appearances: 9 (First in 1992)
- Best result: 6th

The Czech Republic men's national softball team is the men's national softball team of the Czech Republic. The team competed at the 1996 ISF Men's World Championship in Midland, Michigan where they finished with 5 wins and 5 losses. The team competed at the 2000 ISF Men's World Championship in East London, South Africa where they finished sixth. The team competed at the 2004 ISF Men's World Championship in Christchurch, New Zealand, where they finished seventh. The team competed at the 2009 ISF Men's World Championship in Saskatoon, Saskatchewan where they finished ninth.
