= South Africa men's national softball team =

South Africa national softball team

Information
- Country: South Africa
- Federation: Softball South Africa
- Confederation: WBSC Africa
- Manager: Malemolla Raphasha
- WBSC World Rank: 14 (31 December 2025)

Men's Softball World Cup
- Appearances: 10 (First in 1968)
- Best result: 7th

The South Africa men's national softball team is the men's national softball team of South Africa administered by Softball South Africa. The team competed at the 1996 ISF Men's World Championship in Midland, Michigan where they finished with 7 wins and 4 losses with Papate Mphahlele as pitcher of the season. The team competed at the 2000 ISF Men's World Championship in East London, South Africa where they finished eighth. The team competed at the 2004 ISF Men's World Championship in Christchurch, New Zealand where they finished twelfth. The team competed at the 2009 ISF Men's World Championship in Saskatoon, Saskatchewan where they finished fifteenth.
