= Dominican Republic men's national softball team =

Medal record

Representing The Dominican Republic

The Dominican Republic men's national softball team is the men's national softball team of Dominican Republic. It is governed by Dominican Republic Softball Federation and takes part in international softball competitions. The team competed at the 2000 ISF Men's World Championship in East London, South Africa where they finished seventh.
