= Mexico men's national softball team =

The Mexico men's national softball team is the men's national softball team of Mexico. It is governed by Federación Mexicana de Softbol, A. C. a member of the International Softball Federation.

The 1988 World Championships were held in Saskatoon, Canada. The team played 13 games in the round robin round. Australia beat Mexico 4–3 in one game in this round.

The 1992 World Championships, the eighth time the event was competed for, was held in Manila. Australia beat Mexico 10–0 in one game in the first round robin round. They finished with 5 wins and 3 losses. The team competed at the 1996 ISF Men's World Championship in Midland, Michigan where they finished with 9 wins and 3 losses. The team competed at the 2000 ISF Men's World Championship in East London, South Africa where they finished eleventh. The team competed at the 2009 ISF Men's World Championship in Saskatoon, Saskatchewan where they finished fourteenth.
