= Canada men's national softball team =

Canada national softball team

Information
- Country: Canada
- Federation: Softball Canada
- Confederation: WBSC Americas
- Manager: John Stuart
- WBSC World Rank: 4 ▼2 (26 April 2023)

Men's Softball World Cup
- Appearances: 17 (First in 1966)
- Best result: Gold (4: 1972, 1976, 1992, 2015)

The Canada men's national softball team represents Canada in international softball. They are overseen by Softball Canada, the governing body of softball in Canada.

== Competitive record ==
The Canada men's national softball team participated in the 1988 World Championships held in Saskatoon, Saskatchewan, Canada. The team played 13 games in the round robin round. Canada beat Australia 7–4 in one game in this round. The team competed at the 1992 ISF Men's World Championship in Manila, Philippines where they finished with 11 wins and 1 loss. The team competed at the 1996 ISF Men's World Championship in Midland, Michigan where they finished with 13 wins and 2 losses. The team competed at the 2000 ISF Men's World Championship in East London, South Africa where they finished fourth. The team competed at the 2004 ISF Men's World Championship in Christchurch, New Zealand where they finished second. The team competed at the 2009 ISF Men's World Championship in Saskatoon, Saskatchewan where they finished third.
