= Venezuela men's national softball team =

Venezuela national softball team

Information
- Country: Venezuela
- Federation: Venezuelan Softball Federation
- Confederation: WBSC Americas
- WBSC World Rank: 2 (14 May 2026)

Men's Softball World Cup
- Appearances: 9 (First in 1966)
- Best result: (gold) 1st (1 time, in 2025)

The Venezuela men's national softball team is the men's national softball team of Venezuela. The team competed at the 1996 ISF Men's World Championship in Midland, Michigan where they finished with 9 wins and 3 losses. The team competed at the 2000 ISF Men's World Championship in East London, South Africa where they finished fifth. The team competed at the 2004 ISF Men's World Championship in Christchurch, New Zealand, where they finished eleventh. The team competed at the 2009 ISF Men's World Championship in Saskatoon, Saskatchewan where they finished fifth.

The team lost to New Zealand in the final of the 2013 ISF Men's World Championship. By finishing as runner-up, they became the first South American softball team to win a medal at the ISF Men's World Championship.
