= Argentina men's national softball team =

Argentina national softball team

Information
- Country: Argentina
- Federation: Softball Argentina
- Confederation: WBSC Americas
- Manager: Julio Gamarci
- WBSC World Rank: 3 (31 December 2025)

Men's Softball World Cup
- Appearances: 10 (First in 1980)
- Best result: 1st
- Best result: (gold) 1st (1 time, in 2019)

Argentina men's national softball team is the national team for Argentina. The team competed at the 1992 ISF Men's World Championship in Manila, Philippines where they finished with 6 wins and 2 losses. The team competed at the 1996 ISF Men's World Championship in Midland, Michigan where they finished with 7 wins and 3 losses. The team competed at the 2004 ISF Men's World Championship in Christchurch, New Zealand, where they finished eighth. The team competed at the 2009 ISF Men's World Championship in Saskatoon, Saskatchewan where they finished seventh.
