= 2022 Men's Softball World Championship squads =

Softball tournament teams

In this article are the confirmed national softball squads for the 2022 Men's Softball World Championship, to be held in Auckland, New Zealand between, 26 November and 4 December 2022. Each team must name a roster of 12 to 16 players. The final squad lists were confirmed by World Baseball Softball Confederation on the 26 November 2022 before the tournament commenced.

== Group A ==
=== Argentina ===
Argentina announced their squad on the 14 October.

2022 Men's Softball World Championship – Argentina roster
Players		Coaches
Pitchers: 4 Huemul Mata; 5 Martín González; 70 Román Godoy	Catchers: 6 Juan Zara; 28 Bruno Motroni; Infielders: 11 Federico Eder; 24 Ladislao Malarckzuc; 27 Manuel Godoy; 35 Francisco Lombardo; 42 Gian Scialacomo; Outfielders: 9 Teo Migliavacca; 12 Lucio Retamar; 13 Santiago Carril; 17 Mariano Montero; 59 Alan Peker	Manager: 1 Julio Gamarci; Coaches: 32 Gustavo Guerrinieri (Third base); 37 Kevin Bolzan (First base); 66 José Guerrinieri (Pitching)

=== Cuba ===
Cuba finalised their squad on 28 October.

2022 Men's Softball World Championship – Cuba roster
Players		Coaches
Pitchers: 4 Alain Román; 18 Gusbal Plutin; 27 Eduardo González	Catchers: 13 Yurisander Ramos; 14 Reinier Vera; Infielders: 1 Yersander Rodríguez; 2 Wilfredo Sánchez; 11 Osvaldo Pérez; 19 Luis Domínguez; 22 Yuri Rodríguez; Outfielders: 5 Anibal Vaillant; 6 Roger Rosete; 17 Reynaldo Lamote; 34 Miguel Savigne; 37 Héctor Castillo; 69 Yasmani Álvarez	Manager: 4 Leonardo Cárdenas; Coaches: 5 Exiqui Echarye (Third base); 9 Esteban Groero (Pitching); 33 Hazel Peña (First base)

=== Czech Republic ===
The Czech Republic squad was announced on 13 September.

2022 Men's Softball World Championship – Czech Republic roster
Players		Coaches
Pitchers: 10 Lukáš Kubát; 18 Marek Malý; 29 Jonáš Hajný; 48 Michal Holobrádek	Catchers: 2 Jakub Osička; 15 Marek Volf; Infielders: 9 Jakub Hajný; 11 Vojtěch Forman; 19 Tomáš Klein; 22 Milan Šulc; 77 Martin Magula; 96 Mikuláš Klas; Outfielders: 7 Jan Hospodka; 32 George Harris; 69 Martin Turek; 99 Vojtěch Buchner	Manager: 24 Lukáš Juriga; 27 Jaroslav Korčák; Coaches: 16 Michal Müller (Coach); 67 Dušan Šnelly (Coach); 90 Jakub Kopřiva (Coach)

=== New Zealand ===
New Zealand announced their world cup squad on 25 October.

2022 Men's Softball World Championship – New Zealand roster
Players		Coaches
Pitchers: 5 Josh Pettett; 10 Daniel Chapman; 24 Pita Rona	Catchers: 7 Cam Watts; 17 Te Wera Bishop; Infielders: 3 Joel Evans; 6 Jerome Raemaki; 20 Thomas Enoka; 22 Tane Mumu; 27 Rhys Evans; 47 Cole Evans; 72 Dante Makea-Matakatea; Outfielders: 23 Connor Peden; 68 Bradley Bennett; 89 Ben Enoka; 99 Reilly Makea	Manager: 2 Mark Sorenson; Coaches: 1 Patrick Shannon (Pitching); 14 Darryl Marino (First base); 42 Casey Eden (Coach)

=== Philippines ===
The Philippines squad was confirmed on 26 November by WBSC.

2022 Men's Softball World Championship – Philippines roster
Players		Coaches
Pitchers: 8 Reagan Parco; 10 Lyonas de Leon; 11 Leo Barredo; 44 Juliuz Dela Cruz; 92 Marlon Pagkaliwagan	Catchers: 4 Denmark Bathan; 21 Melvin de Castro; 30 Kenneth Torres; Infielders: 20 Micheal Pagkaliwagan; 22 Justine Rosales; 72 Julius Diaz; 73 Jerome Bacarisas; Outfielders: 9 Francis Generoso; 18 Efril Mercado; 29 Gerone Riparip; 51 Mark Gaspi	Manager: 2 Jasper Cabrera; Coaches: 12 Edwin Mercado (Coach); 20 Raymundo Pagkaliwagan (Pitching); 99 Isidro Abello (First base)

=== United States ===
United States announced their world cup squad on 30 September.

2022 Men's Softball World Championship – United States roster
Players		Coaches
Pitchers: 11 Jon Gwizdala; 16 Jerlin Rutt; 22 Brad Kilpatrick; 25 Javier Caballero	Catchers: 7 Nick Mullins; 35 Tyler Bouley; Infielders: 1 Blaine Milheim; 4 Matt Palazzo; 5 Jordan Sherman; 8 Erick Ochoa; 9 Zac Shaw; 20 Cameron Schiller; 76 Codi Pannebecker; Outfielders: 2 Tyler Johnson; 23 Jonathan Lynch; 28 Yusef Davis	Manager: 51 Ron Hackett; Coaches: 6 Greg Hicks (Coach); 10 Gerald Muizelaar (Pitching); 44 Roman Foore (Coach)

== Group B ==
=== Australia ===
Australia's world championship squad was announced on 28 September.

2022 Men's Softball World Championship – Australia roster
Players		Coaches
Pitchers: 9 Jay Selu; 13 Adam Folkard; 26 Marshall Kronk; 57 Jack Besgrove	Catchers: 10 Riley James; 21 Joshua McGovern; 36 Jack Burt; Infielders: 4 Joshua White; 27 Nick Shailes; 34 Matthew Harrow; 38 Julian Jemmott; 99 James Todhunter; Outfielders: 7 Brendon O'Byrne; 12 Callum Beashel; 14 Hayden Mathews; 19 Scott Patterson	Manager: Laing Harrow; Coaches: Nathan Jones (Bench); David Metekingi (Bench); Adam Rindfleish (Bench)

=== Canada ===
Canada announced their world cup squad on 9 September.

2022 Men's Softball World Championship – Canada roster
Players		Coaches
Pitchers: 21 Zach Pierce; 44 Sean Cleary; 49 Justin Schofield	Catchers: 33 Bryan Abrey; 51 Ryan Boland; Infielders: 6 Tyler Pauli; 9 Colin Walsh; 10 Jason Hill; 29 Derek Mayson; 40 Cory Jones; 91 Shane Boland; 97 Justin Laskowski; Outfielders: 15 Mathieu Roy; 22 Bradley Ezekiel; 52 Quinten Bruce	Manager: 11 John Stuart; Coaches: 3 Doug Allin (Coach); 16 John Hill (Coach); 19 Jeff Ellsworth (Coach); 39 Les Howey (Coach)

=== Denmark ===
The Denmark squad was confirmed on 26 November by WBSC.

2022 Men's Softball World Championship – Denmark roster
Players		Coaches
Pitchers: 11 Kim Hansen; 60 Valdemar Terkelsen; 75 Lukas Lohmann	Catchers: 9 Anders Svane; 17 Anton Brown; 42 Oscar Andersen; 95 Nicholai Andersen; Infielders: 2 Daniel Julenon; 44 Jens Terkelsen; 66 Tobias Holmelund; 76 Nicolai Elsner; 93 Magnus Kirstein; 98 Alexander Lorentsen; Outfielders: 29 Martin Simonsen; 34 Anton Larsen; 61 Morten Estrup	Manager: 80 Craig Wallace; Coaches: 12 Scott Easthope (Pitching); 90 Gareth Cook (First base)

=== Japan ===
The Denmark squad was confirmed on 26 November by WBSC.

2022 Men's Softball World Championship – Japan roster
Players		Coaches
Pitchers: 5 Takuro Kawano; 11 Yuya Yamawaki; 15 Kento Okazaki; 17 Reo Koyama; 20 Hikaru Matsuda	Catchers: 10 Taiyo Kataoka; 18 Keisuke Kitazawa; Infielders: 1 Hiroshi Sakata; 7 Yusuke Sakuraba; 8 Kotaro Yasumi; 35 Kazuya Toriyama; 52 Ryoyu Une; Outfielders: 19 Yusuke Morita; 23 Seii Kuroiwa; 24 Naoaki Kawada; 42 Tei Hamamoto	Manager: 30 Hiroshi Yoshimura; Coaches: 31 Shinji Eguchi (Coach); 32 Kengo Terui (Coach)

=== South Africa ===
South Africa announced their world cup squad on 1 September.

2022 Men's Softball World Championship – South Africa roster
Players		Coaches
Pitchers: 10 Manhlane Manaka; 18 Tidima Kekana; 21 Lucas Lamola; 22 Grant Olivier	Catchers: 9 Alistair Veale; 13 Mankomoro Chepape; 20 Matsobane Hlanga; 34 Tyrone Milne; Infielders: 4 Sehlabi Molokoane; 6 Malesela Phasha; 11 Mogau Thupudi; 12 Phomolo Phaladi; Outfielders: 3 Rowen Ebersohn; 14 Tyler Croft; 45 Mandla Matswenyane; 77 Altino Elliot	Manager: 99 Malemolla Raphasha; Coaches: 17 Nakedi Mohlake (Pitching); 24 Kealeka Seshoka (First base); 49 Gladstone Letsoalo (Bench); 98 Simon Raphalo (Third base)

=== Venezuela ===
Venezuela announced their world cup squad on 26 November 2022 via WBSC.

2022 Men's Softball World Championship – Venezuela roster
Players		Coaches
Pitchers: 15 Erick Urbaneja; 30 Eudomar Toyo; 16 Victor Guedez; 36 Frank Ugas	Catchers: 22 Rafael Flores; 17 Luis Morales; Infielders: 7 Jorge Lima; 9 Angel Adames; 24 Erwin Diaz; 2 Edison Marrero; 14 Rogelio Sequera; Outfielders: 18 Carlos Ojeda; 19 Carlos Villegas; 11 Engelberth Herrera; 47 Ricardo Luckert	Manager: Luis Russo; Coaches: German Lopez (Coach); Omar Torres (Pitching)
