= 2023 Men's Softball Oceania Championship squads =

In this article are the confirmed national softball squads for the 2023 Men's Softball Oceania Championship, to be held in Tafuna, American Samoa between, 9 and 11 November 2023. Each team must name a roster of 12 to 16 players. The final squad lists were confirmed by World Baseball Softball Confederation on the 9 November 2023 before the tournament commenced.

== Squads ==
=== American Samoa ===
American Samoa announced their squad on 26–31 October 2023.

2023 Men's Softball Oceania Championship – American Samoa roster
Players		Coaches
Pitchers: 3 Harry-James Fatu; 12 Richard Nomura	Catchers: 0 Tulituualofa Leutele; 21 Joshua Lam Sam; 39 Aifili Solaita; Infielders: 6 Tamatoaoloufatu Malae-Kitiona; 8 Kelemete Kaio (co-captain); 13 Tyrese Leutele; 17 Kapeli Selesitino; 20 Kenneth Mauga-Lei; 25 Kameron Collins (co-captain); Outfielders: 1 Cedrick Lei Sam; 5 Alefosio Luani; 7 Vegas Pearson; 9 Galuefa Rarotonga; 19 Tuaoloina Solofa	Manager: Hendrix Scanlan; Onolata Saleapaga; Coaches: Rhoderick Tarray (First base); Poyer Pila Samuelu II (Third base); Josephine Satele (Pitching)

=== Australia ===
Australia's squad was announced on 27 September 2023.

2023 Men's Softball World Championship – Australia roster
Players		Coaches
Pitchers: 2 Mark Harris; 22 Jarryd Farrell; 33 Mathew Beckett	Catchers: 36 Jack Burt; 66 James Purcell; Infielders: 7 Brendon O'Byrne (captain); 34 Matthew Harrow; 48 Jarrod Bradbury; 83 Peter Wards; Outfielders: 19 Scott Patterson (vice captain); 55 Matt Wickham; 87 Nathan Lynch; Utility: 11 Cody Smith	Manager: Laing Harrow; Coaches: Nathan Jones (Coach)

=== New Zealand ===
The New Zealand squad was announced on 26 September 2023.

2023 Men's Softball Oceania Championship – New Zealand roster
Players		Coaches
Pitchers: 12 Floyd Nola; 73 Eruera Drage	Catchers: 6 Jayden Stratford-Long; 7 Cameron Watts; Infielders: 18 Pita Rona; 27 Tane Mumu; 33 Liam Potts; 47 Cole Evans (captain); Outfielders: 10 Te Kirika Cooper-Nicola; 24 Jackson Watt; 99 Reilly Makea; Utility: 5 Callum Bishop; 9 Hohepa Monk; 20 Zachary Boyd; 29 Wayne Laulu	Manager: Thomas Makea; Coaches: Steven Deans (Coach)
