= 2023 Men's Softball Oceania Championship =

Men's international softball tournament

Tournament details
- Host country: American Samoa
- Dates: 9–11 November 2023
- Teams: 3 (from 1 continent)
- Venue: 1 (in 1 host city)

Final positions
- Champions: Australia (1st title)
- Runner-up: New Zealand
- Third place: American Samoa

Tournament statistics
- Games played: 9
- Best batting average: (Australia) Jarryd Farrell (1.000)
- Most homeruns hit: (New Zealand) Hohepa Monk (3)
- Most stolen bases: (New Zealand) Zachary Boyd (New Zealand) Tane Mumu (3)
- Most strikeouts (as pitcher): (Australia) Mathew Beckett (New Zealand) Liam Potts (16)

The 2023 Men's Softball Oceania Championship was the inaugural edition of the Men's Softball Oceania Championship, the international men's softball championship of Oceania organized by WBSC Oceania. The top two teams qualified for the 2025 Men's Softball World Cup.

== Format ==
The tournament was a round robin format with each team playing each other three times over the course of three days.

== Venues ==
All games were played at the Tony Solaita Field in Tafuna, American Samoa.

2023 Men's Softball Oceania Championship is located in American Samoa	Tafuna
2023 Men's Softball Oceania Championship is located in American Samoa	Tony Solaita Field
2023 Men's Softball Oceania Championship is located in American Samoa	Capacity: 500

== Teams ==
The following three teams competed in the inaugural edition.

- American Samoa (hosts)
- Australia
- New Zealand

== Standings ==
Pos	Team	Pld	W	L	RF	RA	RD	PCT	GB	Qualification
1	Australia	6	5	1	69	13	+56	.833	—	Qualification for 2025 Men's Softball World Cup
2	New Zealand	6	4	2	56	21	+35	.667	1	Qualification for 2025 Men's Softball World Cup
3	American Samoa (H)	6	0	6	0	91	−91	.000	5	

Source: WBSC Oceania
Rules for classification: 1) Wins/losses; 2) Head to head; 3) Head to head runs against; 4) Runs against; 5) Head to head
(H) Hosts

== Results ==
All times are local SST, (UTC-11).

9 November 2023; 12:00	Australia	16–0 (F/3)	American Samoa	Tony Solaita Field, Tafuna; Umpires: Trevor Murphy (HP), James English (1B), Andrew McManus (3B)
9 November 2023; 12:00	WP: Mathew Beckett (1–0)	Boxscore	LP: Richard Nomura (0–1)	Tony Solaita Field, Tafuna; Umpires: Trevor Murphy (HP), James English (1B), Andrew McManus (3B)

9 November 2023; 15:00	Australia	3–9	New Zealand	Tony Solaita Field, Tafuna; Umpires: Mark Porteous (HP), Andrew McManus (1B), James English (2B), Trevor Murphy (3B)
9 November 2023; 15:00	LP: Mark Harris (0–1)	Boxscore	WP: Eruera Drage (1–0)	Tony Solaita Field, Tafuna; Umpires: Mark Porteous (HP), Andrew McManus (1B), James English (2B), Trevor Murphy (3B)
9 November 2023; 15:00	HR: Matt Wickham (1), Scott Patterson (1)	Boxscore	HR: Wayne Laulu (1)	Tony Solaita Field, Tafuna; Umpires: Mark Porteous (HP), Andrew McManus (1B), James English (2B), Trevor Murphy (3B)

9 November 2023; 19:00	American Samoa	0–15 (F/3)	New Zealand	Tony Solaita Field, Tafuna; Umpires: James English (HP), Trevor Murphy (1B), Andrew McManus (2B), Mark Porteous (3B)
9 November 2023; 19:00	LP: Tyrese Leutele (0–1)	Boxscore	WP: Liam Potts (1–0)	Tony Solaita Field, Tafuna; Umpires: James English (HP), Trevor Murphy (1B), Andrew McManus (2B), Mark Porteous (3B)
9 November 2023; 19:00		Boxscore	HR: Hohepa Monk (1), Cameron Watts (1)	Tony Solaita Field, Tafuna; Umpires: James English (HP), Trevor Murphy (1B), Andrew McManus (2B), Mark Porteous (3B)

10 November 2023; 12:00	New Zealand	4–11 (F/5)	Australia	Tony Solaita Field, Tafuna; Umpires: Trevor Murphy (HP), James English (1B), Mark Porteous (3B)
10 November 2023; 12:00	WP: Eruera Drage (1–1)	Boxscore	WP: Jarryd Farrell (1–0)	Tony Solaita Field, Tafuna; Umpires: Trevor Murphy (HP), James English (1B), Mark Porteous (3B)
10 November 2023; 12:00	HR: Hohepa Monk (2), Te Kirika Cooper-Nicola (1)	Boxscore	HR: Scott Patterson (2)	Tony Solaita Field, Tafuna; Umpires: Trevor Murphy (HP), James English (1B), Mark Porteous (3B)

10 November 2023; 15:00	New Zealand	15–0 (F/3)	American Samoa	Tony Solaita Field, Tafuna; Umpires: Andrew McManus (HP), Mark Porteous (1B), Trevor Murphy (3B)
10 November 2023; 15:00	WP: Floyd Nola (1–0)	Boxscore	LP: Richard Nomura (0–2)	Tony Solaita Field, Tafuna; Umpires: Andrew McManus (HP), Mark Porteous (1B), Trevor Murphy (3B)
10 November 2023; 15:00	HR: Hohepa Monk (3)	Boxscore		Tony Solaita Field, Tafuna; Umpires: Andrew McManus (HP), Mark Porteous (1B), Trevor Murphy (3B)

10 November 2023; 18:00	Australia	21–0 (F/4)	American Samoa	Tony Solaita Field, Tafuna; Umpires: James English (HP), Andrew McManus (1B), Mark Porteous (3B)
10 November 2023; 18:00	WP: Mark Harris (1–1)	Boxscore	LP: Aifili Solaita (0–1)	Tony Solaita Field, Tafuna; Umpires: James English (HP), Andrew McManus (1B), Mark Porteous (3B)
10 November 2023; 18:00	HR: Matt Wickham (2), Jarryd Farrell (1), Cody Smith (1)	Boxscore		Tony Solaita Field, Tafuna; Umpires: James English (HP), Andrew McManus (1B), Mark Porteous (3B)

11 November 2023; 12:00	New Zealand	0–7 (F/5)	Australia	Tony Solaita Field, Tafuna; Umpires: Andrew McManus (HP), James English (1B), Mark Porteous (2B), Trevor Murphy (3B)
11 November 2023; 12:00	LP: Pita Rona (0–1)	Boxscore	WP: Jarryd Farrell (2–0)	Tony Solaita Field, Tafuna; Umpires: Andrew McManus (HP), James English (1B), Mark Porteous (2B), Trevor Murphy (3B)
11 November 2023; 12:00		Boxscore	HR: Mark Harris (1), Matthew Harrow (1)	Tony Solaita Field, Tafuna; Umpires: Andrew McManus (HP), James English (1B), Mark Porteous (2B), Trevor Murphy (3B)

11 November 2023; 15:00	American Samoa	0–11 (F/4)	Australia	Tony Solaita Field, Tafuna; Umpires: Mark Porteous (HP), Andrew McManus (1B), Trevor Murphy (2B), James English (3B)
11 November 2023; 15:00	LP: Tyrese Leutele (0–2)	Boxscore	WP: Mathew Beckett (2–0)	Tony Solaita Field, Tafuna; Umpires: Mark Porteous (HP), Andrew McManus (1B), Trevor Murphy (2B), James English (3B)
11 November 2023; 15:00		Boxscore	HR: Mark Harris (2), James Purcell (1), Mathew Beckett (1)	Tony Solaita Field, Tafuna; Umpires: Mark Porteous (HP), Andrew McManus (1B), Trevor Murphy (2B), James English (3B)

11 November 2023; 18:00	American Samoa	0–13 (F/4)	New Zealand	Tony Solaita Field, Tafuna; Umpires: Trevor Murphy (HP), James English (1B), Mark Porteous (3B)
11 November 2023; 18:00	LP: Aifili Solaita (0–2)	Boxscore	WP: Liam Potts (2–0)	Tony Solaita Field, Tafuna; Umpires: Trevor Murphy (HP), James English (1B), Mark Porteous (3B)
11 November 2023; 18:00		Boxscore	HR: Zachary Boyd (1, 2)	Tony Solaita Field, Tafuna; Umpires: Trevor Murphy (HP), James English (1B), Mark Porteous (3B)

== Homeruns ==
There were 19 homeruns scored in 9 matches, for an average of 2.11 homeruns per match.

3 homeruns

- (New Zealand) Hohepa Monk

2 homeruns

- (Australia) Mark Harris
- (Australia) Scott Patterson
- (Australia) Matt Wickham
- (New Zealand) Zachary Boyd

1 homerun

- (Australia) Mathew Beckett
- (Australia) Jarryd Farrell
- (Australia) Matthew Harrow
- (Australia) James Purcell
- (Australia) Cody Smith
- (New Zealand) Te Kirika Cooper-Nicola
- (New Zealand) Wayne Laulu
- (New Zealand) Cameron Watts

== Qualified teams for 2025 Men's Softball World Cup ==
The following two teams from WBSC Oceania qualified for the 2025 Men's Softball World Cup.

Team	Qualified on	Previous appearances in Men's Softball World Cup^{1}
Australia	10 November 2023	11 (1988, 1992, 1996, 2000, 2004, **2009** 2013, 2015, 2017, 2019, **2022**)
New Zealand	10 November 2023	17 (1966, 1968, 1972, **1976**, 1980, **1984**, 1988, 1992, **1996**, **2000**, **2004**, 2009 **2013**, 2015, **2017**, 2019, 2022)

^{1} Bold indicates champions for that year. Italic indicates hosts for that year.

== Broadcasting ==
All matches were streamed on KVZK-TV's YouTube channel.
