= Softball at the 2019 Pan American Games – Men's tournament =

Softball – Men's tournament at the 2019 Pan American Games
- Venue: Softball Field, Villa María del Triunfo
- Start date: 25 July 2019
- End date: 1 August 2019

The men's softball tournament at the 2019 Pan American Games in Lima, Peru was held between 25 July and 1 August 2019. Six nations participated.

== Qualification ==
=== Men ===
A total of five nations qualified to compete. The host nation, Peru, automatically qualified.

| Event | Dates | Location | Vacancies | Qualified |
|---|---|---|---|---|
| Host Nation | —N/a | —N/a | 1 | Peru |
| 2017 Pan American Championships | 15–24 September | (Dominican Republic) Santo Domingo | 5 | Venezuela; Argentina; United States; Mexico; Cuba |
| Total | | | 6 | |

- Canada, which has won every gold medal in this event at the Pan American Games, failed to qualify for the tournament.

== Results ==
All times are in Peru Time. (UTC−5)

=== Preliminary round ===
| Team | Pld | W | L | RF | RA | RD | Qualification |
|---|---|---|---|---|---|---|---|
| Argentina | 5 | 5 | 0 | 29 | 4 | +25 | Qualified for the semifinals |
| United States | 5 | 4 | 1 | 38 | 10 | +28 | Qualified for the semifinals |
| Cuba | 5 | 3 | 2 | 33 | 22 | +11 | Qualified for the semifinals |
| Mexico | 5 | 2 | 3 | 31 | 23 | +8 | Qualified for the semifinals |
| Venezuela | 5 | 1 | 4 | 7 | 17 | −10 | |
| Peru | 5 | 0 | 5 | 0 | 62 | −62 | |

Home team in each game is listed first.

| 25 July 2019; 14:00 | Mexico | 3–4 | Argentina | Softball Field, Villa María del Triunfo; Attendance: 500 |
| 25 July 2019; 14:00 | | Boxscore | | Softball Field, Villa María del Triunfo; Attendance: 500 |

| 25 July 2019; 13:00 | Venezuela | 3–8 | United States | Softball Field, Villa María del Triunfo; Attendance: 0 |
| 25 July 2019; 13:00 | | Boxscore | | Softball Field, Villa María del Triunfo; Attendance: 0 |

| 25 July 2019; 16:00 | Peru | 0–15 (F/4) | Cuba | Softball Field, Villa María del Triunfo; Attendance: 475 |
| 25 July 2019; 16:00 | | Boxscore | | Softball Field, Villa María del Triunfo; Attendance: 475 |

| 27 July 2019; 10:00 | Argentina | 1–0 (F/8) | Venezuela | Softball Field, Villa María del Triunfo; Attendance: 612 |
| 27 July 2019; 10:00 | | Boxscore | | Softball Field, Villa María del Triunfo; Attendance: 612 |

| 27 July 2019; 13:00 | United States | 4–2 | Cuba | Softball Field, Villa María del Triunfo; Attendance: 723 |
| 27 July 2019; 13:00 | | Boxscore | | Softball Field, Villa María del Triunfo; Attendance: 723 |

| 27 July 2019; 16:00 | Mexico | 11–0 (F/4) | Peru | Softball Field, Villa María del Triunfo; Attendance: 0 |
| 27 July 2019; 16:00 | | Boxscore | | Softball Field, Villa María del Triunfo; Attendance: 0 |

| 28 July 2019; 10:00 | Argentina | 3–0 | United States | Softball Field, Villa María del Triunfo; Attendance: 715 |
| 28 July 2019; 10:00 | | Boxscore | | Softball Field, Villa María del Triunfo; Attendance: 715 |

| 28 July 2019; 13:00 | Cuba | 12–10 | Mexico | Softball Field, Villa María del Triunfo; Attendance: 667 |
| 28 July 2019; 13:00 | | Boxscore | | Softball Field, Villa María del Triunfo; Attendance: 667 |

| 28 July 2019; 16:00 | Peru | 0–3 | Venezuela | Softball Field, Villa María del Triunfo; Attendance: 914 |
| 28 July 2019; 16:00 | | Boxscore | | Softball Field, Villa María del Triunfo; Attendance: 914 |

| 29 July 2019; 10:00 | Cuba | 1–8 | Argentina | Softball Field, Villa María del Triunfo |
| 29 July 2019; 10:00 | | Boxscore | | Softball Field, Villa María del Triunfo |

| 29 July 2019; 13:00 | Venezuela | 1–5 | Mexico | Softball Field, Villa María del Triunfo |
| 29 July 2019; 13:00 | | Boxscore | | Softball Field, Villa María del Triunfo |

| 29 July 2019; 16:00 | Peru | 0–20 | United States | Softball Field, Villa María del Triunfo |
| 29 July 2019; 16:00 | | Boxscore | | Softball Field, Villa María del Triunfo |

| 30 July 2019; 10:00 | Venezuela | 0–3 | Cuba | Softball Field, Villa María del Triunfo |
| 30 July 2019; 10:00 | | Boxscore | | Softball Field, Villa María del Triunfo |

| 30 July 2019; 14:00 | United States | 6–2 | Mexico | Softball Field, Villa María del Triunfo |
| 30 July 2019; 14:00 | | Boxscore | | Softball Field, Villa María del Triunfo |

| 30 July 2019; 18:00 | Argentina | 13–0 | Peru | Softball Field, Villa María del Triunfo |
| 30 July 2019; 18:00 | | Boxscore | | Softball Field, Villa María del Triunfo |

=== Medal round ===
Semifinals
1 | Argentina | 7
2 | United States | 0
3 | Cuba | 4
4 | Mexico | 7

Final
2 | United States | 7
4 | Mexico | 4

Grand Final
1 | Argentina | 5
2 | United States | 0

==== Semifinals ====
| 31 July 2019; 10:00 | Cuba | 4–7 | Mexico | Softball Field, Villa María del Triunfo |
| 31 July 2019; 10:00 | | Boxscore | | Softball Field, Villa María del Triunfo |

| 31 July 2019; 14:00 | Argentina | 7–0 | United States | Softball Field, Villa María del Triunfo |
| 31 July 2019; 14:00 | | Boxscore | | Softball Field, Villa María del Triunfo |

==== Final ====
| 1 August 2019; 10:00 | United States | 7–4 | Mexico | Softball Field, Villa María del Triunfo |
| 1 August 2019; 10:00 | | Boxscore | | Softball Field, Villa María del Triunfo |

==== Grand Final ====
| 1 August 2019; 14:00 | Argentina | 5–0 | United States | Softball Field, Villa María del Triunfo |
| 1 August 2019; 14:00 | | Boxscore | | Softball Field, Villa María del Triunfo |
