= New Zealand men's national under-23 softball team =

New Zealand under-23 softball team

Information
- Country: New Zealand
- Federation: Softball New Zealand
- Confederation: WBSC Oceania
- Manager: Steve Deans and Fergus McAlpine

The New Zealand men's under-23 softball team represents New Zealand in international under-23 softball. The team is administered by Softball New Zealand.

The team played their first official matches at the 2023 U-23 Men's Softball World Cup where they were grouped with Canada, Japan, Venezuela, Guatemala and Israel.

== History ==
Prior to the U-23 Men's Softball World Cup being introduced, the Major Sox had played friendlies and been on tour to Indonesia and Canada among other.

The inaugural U-23 Men's Softball World Cup was scheduled to take place in October 2022, but was postponed due to a number of reasons. As one of the 2 men's softball sides in Oceania New Zealand qualified along with Australia.

== Results and fixtures ==
The following is a list of match results in the last 12 months, as well as any future matches that have been scheduled.

Win Draw Loss Fixture

=== 2023 ===
2023 U-23 Men's Softball World Cup	15 April	New Zealand	9–0 (F/5)	Israel	El Plumazo, Argentina
2023 U-23 Men's Softball World Cup	12:30 (ART)	WP: Liam Potts (1–0)	Boxscore	LP: Leon Kfir (0–1)	Attendance: 300; Umpires: Edwin Ortiz (HP), Ysidro Almonte Caraballo (1B), Patrick Reus (2B), Todd Davis (3B)

2023 U-23 Men's Softball World Cup	16 April	New Zealand	9–3	Venezuela	Estadio Mundialista de Sóftbol, Argentina
2023 U-23 Men's Softball World Cup	17:30 (ART)	WP: Taine James Pirini Slaughter; Sv: Floyd Marijan Nola; HR: Huw Griffyn Davies (1), Brock Cody Evans (1)	Boxscore	LP: Diomar Alejandro Salas Alvarado	Attendance: 400; Umpires: Todd Davis (HP), Gabriela Elizabeth Jimenez (1B), Ysidro Almonte Caraballo (2B), Nicolas Eleazar Deu (3B)

2023 U-23 Men's Softball World Cup	17 April	New Zealand	7–0	Team WBSC	Estadio Mundialista de Sóftbol, Argentina
2023 U-23 Men's Softball World Cup	11:30 (ART)	WP: Taine James Pirini Slaughter; Sv: Liam Potts	Boxscore	LP: Diego Morales	Attendance: 300; Umpires: Pablo Acosta (HP), Manuel Tovar (1B), Orelvis Silverio (2B), Patrick Reus (3B)

2023 U-23 Men's Softball World Cup	18 April	Canada	5–3	New Zealand	Estadio Mundialista de Sóftbol, Argentina
2023 U-23 Men's Softball World Cup	17:30 (ART)	WP: Riley James Manion; Sv: Reese Yantzi	Boxscore	LP: Taine James Pirini Slaughter	Attendance: 310; Umpires: Glenn Brown (HP), Orelvis Silverio (1B), Nicolas Eleazar Deu (2b), Pablo Acosta (3B)

2023 U-23 Men's Softball World Cup	19 April	Japan	5–0	New Zealand	Estadio Mundialista de Sóftbol, Argentina
2023 U-23 Men's Softball World Cup	17:30 (ART)	WP: Taiga Onishi	Boxscore	LP: Floyd Marijan Nola	Attendance: 350; Umpires: Gabriela Elizabeth Jimenez (HP), Patrick Reus (1B), Ysidro Almonte Caraballo (2B), Pablo Acosta (3B)

2023 U-23 Men's Softball World Cup	20 April	New Zealand	4–1	Australia	Estadio Mundialista de Sóftbol, Argentina
2023 U-23 Men's Softball World Cup	12:30 (ART)	WP: Liam Potts	Boxscore	LP: Jack Besgrove; HR: Ryan King	Attendance: 324; Umpires: Glenn Brown (HP), Daryl Helmer (1B), Edwin Ortiz (2B), Nicolas Eleazar Deu (3B)

2023 U-23 Men's Softball World Cup	21 April	New Zealand	1–8 (F/5)	Argentina	Estadio Mundialista de Sóftbol, Argentina
2023 U-23 Men's Softball World Cup	20:30 (ART)	LP: Liam Potts	Boxscore	WP: Matias Etchevers; HR: Alan Peker, Juan Cruz Garoli	Attendance: 1,445; Umpires: William Lopez (HP), Daryl Helmer (1B), Manuel Tovar (2B), Glenn Brown (3B)

2023 U-23 Men's Softball World Cup	22 April	New Zealand	4–5	Mexico	Estadio Mundialista de Sóftbol, Argentina
2023 U-23 Men's Softball World Cup	14:30 (ART)	LP: Liam Potts; HR: Brock Attewell	Boxscore	WP: Jose Gustavo Valdez Chaparro	Attendance: 1,130; Umpires: Nicolas Eleazar Deu (HP), Manuel Tovar (1B), Daryl Helmer (2B), Pablo Acosta (3B)

== Players ==
=== Current squad ===
The following 16 players were called up for the 2023 U-23 Men's Softball World Cup.

- Brock Attewell
- Oscar Clark
- Te Kirika Cooper-Nicola
- Damon Creasy
- Huw Davies
- Max Earley
- Brock Evans
- Seth Gibson
- Xaviar Herrick
- Josh Lubiejewski
- Tobias Makisi
- Floyd Nola
- Liam Potts
- Kaleb Rona
- Taine Slaughter
- Caleb Stewart

== Competition record ==
U-23 World Cup
Year	Host	Round	Pos	Pld	W	L	RF	RA	RD
2023	Argentina	Super Round	6th	8	4	4	39	20	+19
2026	Colombia	Fourth place	4th	9	6	3	56	27	+29
Total		4th	2/2	17	10	7	96	47	+48
