= 2023 U-23 Men's Softball World Cup =

Tournament details
- Host country: Argentina
- Dates: 15 – 23 April 2023
- Teams: 12
- Venues: 2 (in 1 host city)

Final positions
- Champions: Australia (1st title)
- Runner-up: Japan
- Third place: Argentina
- Fourth place: Mexico

The 2023 U-23 WBSC Men's Softball World Cup is the inaugural U-23 Men's Softball World Cup, an international softball tournament taking place in Paraná, Argentina from 15 to 23 April 2023. Originally scheduled for October 2022, the tournament was postponed due to a number of reasons. The bidding process was reopened and once again awarded to Paraná in Argentina.

== Qualified teams ==
Team	Method of qualification
Argentina	U-23 Men's Softball Pan American Championship winners/Hosts
South Africa	Africa qualifier winner
Venezuela	U-23 Men's Softball Pan American Championship third place
Mexico	U-23 Men's Softball Pan American Championship runners-up
Team WBSC (Note: Guatemala will compete under the WBSC flag due to the National Olympic Committee of Guatemala being suspended by the International Olympic Committee.)	U-23 Men's Softball Pan American Championship fourth place
Japan	U-23 Men's Softball Asia winners
Singapore	U-23 Men's Softball Asia runners-up
Czech Republic	U-23 Men's Softball European Championship winners
Israel	U-23 Men's Softball European Championship third place (Note: Denmark finished second but waved qualification for technical reasons.)
Australia	Oceania
New Zealand	Oceania
Canada	Wildcard

== Venue ==
Estadio Mundialista de Sóftbol and El Plumazo in Paraná, Entre Ríos will host all the games across two fields.

2023 U-23 Men's Softball World Cup is located in Argentina	Paraná	
2023 U-23 Men's Softball World Cup is located in Argentina	Estadio Mundialista de Sóftbol	El Plumazo
2023 U-23 Men's Softball World Cup is located in Argentina	Capacity: 500	Capacity:

== Opening Round ==
=== Group A ===
Pos	Team	Pld	W	L	RF	RA	RD	PCT	GB	Qualification
1	Australia	5	5	0	23	8	+15	1.000	—	Super Round
2	Mexico	5	4	1	27	17	+10	.800	1	Super Round
3	Argentina (H)	5	3	2	20	8	+12	.600	2	Super Round
4	Czech Republic	5	2	3	12	13	−1	.400	3	Placement Round
5	South Africa	5	1	4	10	27	−17	.200	4	Placement Round
6	Singapore	5	0	5	14	33	−19	.000	5	Placement Round

Source: WBSC
Rules for classification: 1) Wins/losses; 2) Head to head; 3) Head to head runs against; 4) Runs against; 5) Head to head
(H) Hosts

15 April 2023 10:30 (ART) Estadio Mundialista de Sóftbol 15 °C (59 °F), partly cloudy
Team	1	2	3	4	5	6	7	R	H	E
Czech Republic	0	0	2	0	0	1	0	3	5	0
South Africa	0	0	0	0	0	0	0	0	1	1
WP: Jonáš Hajný (1–0) LP: Kagiso Frans Aphane (0–1) Sv: Lukáš Kubát (1); Home runs: CZE: George Harris (1); RSA: None; Attendance: 67; Boxscore

15 April 2023 15:30 (ART) El Plumazo 23 °C (73 °F), partly cloudy
Team	1	2	3	4	5	6	7	R	H	E
Singapore	1	1	1	0	0	0	0	3	4	0
Australia	1	5	1	0	0	0	X	7	4	1
WP: Jack Besgrove (1–0) LP: Tan Mathew (0–1); Home runs: SGP: Ean Eu (1); AUS: Cody Smith (1); Attendance: 100; Boxscore

15 April 2023 21:00 (ART) Estadio Mundialista de Sóftbol 19 °C (66 °F), clear
Team	1	2	3	4	5	6	7	R	H	E
Mexico	0	0	0	0	3	2	0	5	8	1
Argentina	0	2	2	0	0	0	0	4	6	0
WP: Jose Gustavo Valdez Chaparro (1–0) LP: Matias Etechevers (0–1); Home runs: MEX: Iran Francisco Torres Laguna (1), Jordan Solorio (1); ARG: Khalil Luna (1); Attendance: 3,000; Boxscore

16 April 2023 11:30 (ART) Estadio Mundialista de Sóftbol 20 °C (68 °F), partly cloudy
Team	1	2	3	4	5	6	7	R	H	E
South Africa	3	1	1	1	0	0	0	6	5	0
Singapore	0	0	0	1	0	0	2	3	7	3
WP: Kagiso Frans Aphane (1–1) LP: Jun Heng Aloysius Ong (0–1); Home runs: RSA: Joshua Ri Ming Tan (1); SGP: None; Attendance: 100; Boxscore

16 April 2023 14:30 (ART) Estadio Mundialista de Sóftbol 18 °C (64 °F), cloudy
Team	1	2	3	4	5	6	7	R	H	E
Mexico	1	0	1	0	2	2	0	6	9	0
Czech Republic	0	0	0	3	0	1	0	4	5	1
WP: Jose Gustavo Valdez Chaparro (2–0) LP: Jakub Osička (0–1); Home runs: MEX: Junior Alexis Flores del Valle (1); CZE: Jakub Hajný (1); Attendance: 120; Boxscore

16 April 2023 20:30 (ART) Estadio Mundialista de Sóftbol 23 °C (73 °F), clear
Team	1	2	3	4	5	6	7	R	H	E
Australia	0	0	0	0	0	0	2	2	4	1
Argentina	0	0	0	0	0	0	1	1	4	4
WP: Jack Besgrove (2–0) LP: Franco Saenz (0–1); Attendance: 1,534; Boxscore

17 April 2023 14:30 (ART) Estadio Mundialista de Sóftbol 21 °C (70 °F), sunny
Team	1	2	3	4	5	6	7	R	H	E
South Africa	0	1	1	0	1	0	0	3	4	2
Australia	0	0	0	3	5	0	X	8	8	1
WP: Lincoln Walk (1–0) LP: Lucas Sebotse Ledwaba (0–1); Home runs: RSA: None; AUS: Thomas Gordon Cass (1); Attendance: 200; Boxscore

17 April 2023 16:00 (ART) El Plumazo 22 °C (72 °F), sunny
Team	1	2	3	4	5	6	7	R	H	E
Singapore	1	0	4	0	0	0	0	5	5	3
Mexico	0	0	0	2	3	3	X	8	9	1
WP: Jose Gustavo Valdez Chaparro (3–0) LP: Tan Mathew (0–2); Home runs: SGP: Joshua Ri Ming Tan (1); MEX: Luis Julian Rodriguez Valdez (1); Attendance: 100; Boxscore

17 April 2023 20:30 (ART) Estadio Mundialista de Sóftbol 17 °C (63 °F), clear
Team	1	2	3	4	5	6	7	R	H	E
Argentina	0	2	0	0	0	0	0	2	6	0
Czech Republic	0	0	0	0	0	0	0	0	0	1
WP: Juan Jose Pepe (1–0) LP: Jakub Osička (0–2); Attendance: 1,059; Boxscore

18 April 2023 14:30 (ART) Estadio Mundialista de Sóftbol 20 °C (68 °F), sunny
Team	1	2	3	4	5	6	7	R	H	E
Mexico	0	0	0	0	1	0	0	1	2	0
Australia	1	0	3	0	0	0	X	4	5	0
WP: Jack Besgrove (3–0) LP: Jose Gustavo Valdez Chaparro (3–1); Home runs: MEX: None; AUS: Ryan King (1); Attendance: 300; Boxscore

18 April 2023 16:00 (ART) El Plumazo 21 °C (70 °F), sunny
Team	1	2	3	4	5	6	7	R	H	E
Czech Republic	0	0	5	0	0	0	0	5	5	0
Singapore	0	0	0	0	2	0	1	3	3	0
WP: Jonáš Hajný (2–0) LP: Huzaifie Bin Mohammad Noorham (0–1); Home runs: CZE: Vojtěch Buchner (1), Jonáš Hajný (1); SGP: None; Attendance: 49; Boxscore

18 April 2023 20:30 (ART) Estadio Mundialista de Sóftbol 17 °C (63 °F), clear
Team	1	2	3	4	5	6	7	R	H	E
Argentina	0	0	3	0	2	1	0	6	5	0
South Africa	0	0	0	1	0	0	0	1	3	3
WP: Matias Etchevers (1–1) LP: Lucas Lamola (0–1); Home runs: ARG: Juan Cruz Garoli (1); RSA: None; Attendance: 1,200; Boxscore

19 April 2023 13:00 (ART) El Plumazo 22 °C (72 °F), sunny
Team	1	2	3	4	5	6	7	R	H	E
Australia	0	0	0	2	0	0	0	2	5	1
Czech Republic	0	0	0	0	0	0	0	0	0	4
WP: Jack Besgrove (4–0) LP: Jakub Osička (0–3); Attendance: 152; Boxscore

19 April 2023 16:00 (ART) El Plumazo 23 °C (73 °F), sunny
Team	1	2	3	4	5	6	7	R	H	E
South Africa	0	0	0	0	0	X	X	0	0	3
Mexico (5)	0	1	0	6	X	X	X	7	7	0
WP: Jesus Arturo Valdez Chaparro (4–1) LP: Kagiso Frans Aphane (1–2); Attendance: 155; Boxscore

19 April 2023 20:30 (ART) Estadio Mundialista de Sóftbol 17 °C (63 °F), clear
Team	1	2	3	4	5	6	7	R	H	E
Singapore	0	0	0	0	0	X	X	0	1	1
Argentina (5)	2	5	0	0	X	X	X	7	2	1
WP: Franco Saenz (1–1) LP: Jun Heng Aloysius Ong (0–2) Sv: Juan Jose Pepe (1); Attendance: 1,500; Boxscore

=== Group B ===
Pos	Team	Pld	W	L	RF	RA	RD	PCT	GB	Qualification
1	Japan	5	5	0	24	3	+21	1.000	—	Super Round
2	Canada	5	3	2	24	11	+13	.600 (Note: Head to head wins: 1 each. Head to head runs against: Canada 5, New Zealand 7, Venezuela 9.)	2	Super Round
3	New Zealand	5	3	2	28	13	+15	.600	2	Super Round
4	Venezuela	5	3	2	13	15	−2	.600	2	Placement Round
5	Israel	5	1	4	8	33	−25	.200	4	Placement Round
6	Team WBSC	5	0	5	10	32	−22	.000	5	Placement Round

Source: WBSC
Rules for classification: 1) Wins/losses; 2) Head to head; 3) Head to head runs against; 4) Runs against; 5) Head to head
Notes:

15 April 2023 12:30 (ART) El Plumazo 18 °C (64 °F), partly cloudy
Team	1	2	3	4	5	6	7	R	H	E
Israel	0	0	0	0	0	X	X	0	1	3
New Zealand (5)	1	2	2	4	X	X	X	9	8	1
WP: Liam Potts (1–0) LP: Leon Kfir (0–1); Attendance: 300; Boxscore

15 April 2023 13:30 (ART) Estadio Mundialista de Sóftbol 22 °C (72 °F), partly cloudy
Team	1	2	3	4	5	6	7	R	H	E
Team WBSC	0	0	0	0	1	1	0	2	8	3
Japan	1	1	0	0	0	3	X	5	5	1
WP: Shota Onodera (1–0) LP: Diego Morales (0–1); Attendance: 101; Boxscore

15 April 2023 16:30 (ART) Estadio Mundialista de Sóftbol 22 °C (72 °F), cloudy
Team	1	2	3	4	5	6	7	R	H	E
Venezuela	0	0	2	0	0	0	0	2	6	0
Canada	0	0	0	0	0	0	0	0	2	0
WP: Frank Ugas (1–0) LP: Reese Yantzi (0–1); Attendance: 454; Boxscore

16 April 2023 13:00 (ART) El Plumazo 21 °C (70 °F), cloudy
Team	1	2	3	4	5	6	7	R	H	E
Team WBSC	0	0	0	1	X	X	X	1	1	2
Canada (4)	0	3	2	6	X	X	X	11	9	2
WP: Riley James Manion (1–0) LP: Diego Morales (0–1) Sv: Jordan Hudson; Attendance: 94; Boxscore

16 April 2023 16:00 (ART) El Plumazo 21 °C (70 °F), cloudy
Team	1	2	3	4	5	6	7	R	H	E
Japan (6)	1	1	1	0	1	3	X	7	10	1
Israel	0	0	0	0	0	0	X	0	1	2
WP: Taiga Onishi (1–0) LP: Seth Benjamin Ross (0–1); Home runs: JPN: Tomoki Kikukawa (1); ISR: None; Attendance: 67; Boxscore

16 April 2023 17:30 (ART) Estadio Mundialista de Sóftbol 20 °C (68 °F), partly cloudy
Team	1	2	3	4	5	6	7	R	H	E
New Zealand	4	2	1	0	0	0	2	9	9	1
Venezuela	0	0	0	0	3	0	0	3	3	3
WP: Taine James Pirini Slaughter (1–0) LP: Diomar Alejandro Salas Alvarado (0–1) Sv: Floyd Marijan Nola; Home runs: NZL: Huw Griffyn Davies (1), Brock Cody Evans (1); VEN: None; Attendance: 400; Boxscore

17 April 2023 11:30 (ART) Estadio Mundialista de Sóftbol 16 °C (61 °F), sunny
Team	1	2	3	4	5	6	7	R	H	E
New Zealand	1	0	0	4	0	1	1	7	10	2
Team WBSC	0	0	0	0	0	0	0	0	3	2
WP: Taine James Pirini Slaughter (1–0) LP: Diego Morales (0–1) Sv: Liam James Potts; Attendance: 300; Boxscore

17 April 2023 13:00 (ART) El Plumazo 21 °C (70 °F), sunny
Team	1	2	3	4	5	6	7	R	H	E
Venezuela	2	0	0	2	0	0	1	5	5	0
Israel	0	0	0	2	0	0	0	2	3	6
WP: Jose Reynaldo Chirinos Vargas (1–0) LP: Kfir Leon (0–1); Attendance: 70; Boxscore

17 April 2023 17:30 (ART) Estadio Mundialista de Sóftbol 19 °C (66 °F), sunny
Team	1	2	3	4	5	6	7	R	H	E
Canada	0	0	0	1	0	0	0	1	2	2
Japan	2	0	3	0	0	0	X	5	8	0
WP: Kazuya Umibe (1–0) LP: Jordan Hudson (0–1) Sv: Koki Yagi; Home runs: CAN: Isaac Lefebvre (1); JPN: None; Attendance: 345; Boxscore

18 April 2023 11:30 (ART) Estadio Mundialista de Sóftbol 17 °C (63 °F), sunny
Team	1	2	3	4	5	6	7	R	H	E
Venezuela	0	0	0	0	0	0	0	0	2	0
Japan	1	0	0	0	0	1	X	2	7	0
WP: Shota Onodera (1–0) LP: Frank Ugas (0–1); Attendance: 300; Boxscore

18 April 2023 13:00 (ART) El Plumazo 18 °C (64 °F), partly cloudy
Team	1	2	3	4	5	6	7	R	H	E
Israel	1	0	1	1	0	3	0	6	6	4
Team WBSC	0	0	2	0	3	0	0	5	8	2
WP: Kfir Leon (1–0) LP: Diego Morales (0–1); Home runs: ISR: Bar-Arie Shrim (1); NTW: None; Attendance: 67; Boxscore

18 April 2023 17:30 (ART) Estadio Mundialista de Sóftbol 21 °C (70 °F), clear
Team	1	2	3	4	5	6	7	R	H	E
Canada	0	1	0	1	2	0	1	5	8	0
New Zealand	0	2	0	0	0	1	0	3	4	0
WP: Riley James Manion (1–0) LP: Taine James Pirini Slaughter (0–1) Sv: Reese Yantzi; Attendance: 310; Boxscore

19 April 2023 11:30 (ART) Estadio Mundialista de Sóftbol 20 °C (68 °F), sunny
Team	1	2	3	4	5	6	7	R	H	E
Team WBSC	0	0	0	0	2	0	0	2	4	3
Venezuela	0	1	1	0	0	0	1	3	9	1
WP: Frank Ugas LP: Diego Morales; Attendance: 814; Boxscore

19 April 2023 14:30 (ART) Estadio Mundialista de Sóftbol 23 °C (73 °F), sunny
Team	1	2	3	4	5	6	7	R	H	E
Israel	0	0	0	0	0	X	X	0	2	2
Canada (5)	4	0	0	1	2	X	X	7	6	0
WP: Jordan Hudson (1–0) LP: Benjamin Ross Seth (0–1); Attendance: 400; Boxscore

19 April 2023 17:30 (ART) Estadio Mundialista de Sóftbol 23 °C (73 °F), sunny
Team	1	2	3	4	5	6	7	R	H	E
Japan	0	0	1	0	4	0	0	5	8	0
New Zealand	0	0	0	0	0	0	0	0	3	1
WP: Taiga Onishi (1–0) LP: Floyd Marijan Nola (0–1); Attendance: 350; Boxscore

== Placement round ==
Pos	Team	Pld	W	L	RF	RA	RD	PCT	GB
1	Czech Republic	5	5	0	27	3	+24	1.000	—
2	Venezuela	5	4	1	17	10	+7	.800	1
3	Singapore	5	2	3	20	16	+4	.400 (Note: Head to head: Singapore 6–1 Israel)	3
4	Israel	5	2	3	14	28	−14	.400	3
5	Team WBSC	5	1	4	8	28	−20	.200 (Note: Head to head: Team WBSC 3–0 South Africa)	4
6	South Africa	5	1	4	26	17	+9	.200	4

Source: WBSC
Rules for classification: 1) Wins/losses; 2) Head to head; 3) Head to head runs against; 4) Runs against; 5) Head to head
Notes:

20 April 2023 11:30 (ART) Estadio Mundialista de Sóftbol 17 °C (63 °F), sunny
Team	1	2	3	4	5	6	7	R	H	E
Israel	0	0	0	0	0	X	X	0	3	3
Czech Republic (5)	0	2	3	4	X	X	X	9	0	0
WP: Lukáš Kubát (1–0) LP: Seth Benjamin Ross (0–1); Attendance: 300; Boxscore

20 April 2023 13:00 (ART) El Plumazo 20 °C (68 °F), sunny
Team	1	2	3	4	5	6	7	R	H	E
Singapore	0	0	0	2	0	1	0	3	5	1
Venezuela	1	0	3	0	1	0	X	5	7	3
WP: Diomar Alejandro Salas Alvarado (1–0) LP: Mathew Tan (0–1) Sv: Jose Reynaldo Chirinos Vargas; Attendance: 256; Boxscore

20 April 2023 16:00 (ART) El Plumazo 22 °C (72 °F), sunny
Team	1	2	3	4	5	6	7	R	H	E
Team WBSC	2	0	0	1	0	0	0	3	4	0
South Africa	0	0	0	0	0	0	0	0	1	1
WP: Diego Morales (1–0) LP: Lucas Lamola (0–1); Attendance: 99; Boxscore

21 April 2023 9:30 (ART) Estadio Mundialista de Sóftbol 19 °C (66 °F), sunny
Team	1	2	3	4	5	6	7	R	H	E
Venezuela	0	0	0	0	0	0	0	0	1	0
Czech Republic	0	1	0	1	0	0	X	2	4	0
WP: Jakub Osička (1–0) LP: Frank Ugas (0–1); Attendance: 89; Boxscore

21 April 2023 11:00 (ART) El Plumazo 21 °C (70 °F), sunny
Team	1	2	3	4	5	6	7	R	H	E
Israel	0	1	0	3	0	0	1	5	8	2
South Africa	0	1	1	0	0	1	0	3	8	2
WP: Kfir Leon (1–0) LP: Kwena Gerald Nkune (0–1); Home runs: ISR: Shani Hadar (1), Kfir Leon (1); RSA: None; Attendance: 110; Boxscore

21 April 2023 14:00 (ART) El Plumazo 24 °C (75 °F), sunny
Team	1	2	3	4	5	6	7	R	H	E
Singapore (4)	0	6	0	5	X	X	X	11	5	1
Team WBSC	0	0	0	0	X	X	X	0	3	1
WP: Tai Jin Jeron Tan (1–0) LP: Gian Paolo Ferrari Véliz (0–1); Home runs: SGP: Ean Eu (1), Shun Kai Cheoh (1); NTW: None; Attendance: 95; Boxscore

22 April 2023 9:30 (ART) Estadio Mundialista de Sóftbol
Team	1	2	3	4	5	6	7	R	H	E
South Africa	1	0	0	0	0	0	0	1	2	0
Venezuela	2	0	0	2	0	0	X	4	5	0
WP: Jose Reynaldo Chirinos Vargas LP: Sebotse Lucas Ledwaba; Attendance: 53; Boxscore

22 April 2023 11:00 (ART) El Plumazo
Team	1	2	3	4	5	6	7	R	H	E
Team WBSC	0	0	0	0	0	X	X	0	1	2
Czech Republic (5)	2	1	3	2	X	X	X	8	9	0
WP: Jonáš Hajný LP: Diego Morales; Attendance: 73; Boxscore

22 April 2023 14:00 (ART) El Plumazo
Team	1	2	3	4	5	6	7	R	H	E
Singapore	1	0	0	4	1	0	0	6	8	1
Israel	0	0	0	0	0	1	0	1	1	1
WP: Tai Jin Jeron Tan LP: Kfir Leon Sv: Mathew Tan; Boxscore

== Super round ==
Pos	Team	Pld	W	L	RF	RA	RD	PCT	GB	Qualification
1	Japan	5	4	1	19	3	+16	.800	—	Advance to Final
2	Australia	5	3	2	12	14	−2	.600 (Note: Head to head wins: Australia 2, Mexico 1, Argentina 0.)	1	Advance to Final
3	Mexico	5	3	2	12	13	−1	.600	1	Advance to third place play-off
4	Argentina (H)	5	3	2	17	9	+8	.600	1	Advance to third place play-off
5	Canada	5	1	4	7	16	−9	.200 (Note: Head to head: Canada 5–3 New Zealand)	3	
6	New Zealand	5	1	4	12	24	−12	.200	3	

Source: WBSC
Rules for classification: 1) Wins/losses; 2) Head to head; 3) Head to head runs against; 4) Runs against; 5) Head to head
(H) Hosts
Notes:

20 April 2023 12:30 (ART) Estadio Mundialista de Sóftbol 22 °C (72 °F), sunny
Team	1	2	3	4	5	6	7	R	H	E
New Zealand	0	1	1	1	0	1	0	4	5	0
Australia	0	1	0	0	0	0	0	1	7	0
WP: Liam James Potts (1–0) LP: Jack Besgrove (0–1) Sv: Floyd Marijan Nola; Home runs: NZL: None; AUS: Ryan King; Attendance: 324; Boxscore

20 April 2023 15:30 (ART) Estadio Mundialista de Sóftbol 23 °C (73 °F), sunny
Team	1	2	3	4	5	6	7	R	H	E
Mexico	0	0	0	0	0	0	0	0	0	0
Japan	1	0	0	0	0	0	X	1	0	0
WP: Kazuya Umibe (1–0) LP: Jesus Arturo Valdez Chaparro (0–1); Attendance: 321; Boxscore

20 April 2023 18:30 (ART) Estadio Mundialista de Sóftbol 17 °C (63 °F), clear
Team	1	2	3	4	5	6	7	R	H	E
Argentina	0	2	0	0	0	1	0	3	8	1
Canada	0	0	0	1	0	0	0	1	1	2
WP: Franco Saenz (1–0) LP: Riley James Manion (0–1) Sv: Juan Jose Pepe; Attendance: 1,112; Boxscore

21 April 2023 12:30 (ART) Estadio Mundialista de Sóftbol 22 °C (72 °F), partly cloudy
Team	1	2	3	4	5	6	7	R	H	E
Canada	0	0	0	0	0	0	0	0	4	0
Mexico	0	0	1	0	0	0	X	1	2	0
WP: Jose Gustavo Valdez Chaparro (1–0) LP: Riley James Manion (0–1); Attendance: 454; Boxscore

21 April 2023 15:30 (ART) Estadio Mundialista de Sóftbol 21 °C (70 °F), partly cloudy
Team	1	2	3	4	5	6	7	R	H	E
Australia	0	0	1	0	0	X	X	1	2	1
Japan (5)	0	0	4	4	X	X	X	8	9	0
WP: Taiga Onishi (1–0) LP: Lincoln Walk (0–1); Home runs: AUS: Jeremy Garland (1); JPN: None; Attendance: 334; Boxscore

21 April 2023 18:30 (ART) Estadio Mundialista de Sóftbol 20 °C (68 °F), clear
Team	1	2	3	4	5	6	7	R	H	E
New Zealand	0	0	0	0	1	X	X	1	2	2
Argentina (5)	3	0	1	0	4	X	X	8	9	2
WP: Matias Etchevers (1–0) LP: Liam James Potts (0–1); Home runs: NZL: None; ARG: Alan Peker (1), Juan Cruz Garoli (1); Attendance: 1,445; Boxscore

22 April 2023 12:30 (ART) Estadio Mundialista de Sóftbol 23 °C (73 °F), partly cloudy
Team	1	2	3	4	5	6	7	R	H	E
New Zealand	0	0	2	0	0	1	1	4	5	1
Mexico	0	2	0	0	1	0	2	5	7	2
WP: Jose Gustavo Valdez Chaparro (1–0) LP: Liam James Potts (0–1); Home runs: NZL: Brock Clint-Samuel Attewell (1); MEX: None; Attendance: 1,130; Boxscore

22 April 2023 15:30 (ART) Estadio Mundialista de Sóftbol 23 °C (73 °F), partly cloudy
Team	1	2	3	4	5	6	7	R	H	E
Canada	0	0	0	0	0	0	0	0	0	0
Australia	3	0	0	0	0	1	X	4	6	0
WP: Jack Besgrove (1–0) LP: Reese Yantzi (0–1); Home runs: CAN: None; AUS: Ashlee Goffer (1); Attendance: 1,499; Boxscore

22 April 2023 18:30 (ART) Estadio Mundialista de Sóftbol 19 °C (66 °F), cloudy
Team	1	2	3	4	5	6	7	8	9	R	H	E
Argentina (9)	0	0	0	0	0	0	0	0	1	1	2	0
Japan	0	0	0	0	0	0	0	0	0	0	3	0
WP: Juan Jose Pepe (0–1) LP: Taiga Onishi (1–0); Attendance: 3,075; Boxscore

== Final round ==
=== Third place play-off ===
23 April 2023 14:00 (ART) Estadio Mundialista de Sóftbol 21 °C (70 °F), partly cloudy
Team	1	2	3	4	5	6	7	R	H	E
Argentina (6)	0	5	0	0	2	3	X	10	14	0
Mexico	0	1	0	0	0	0	X	1	5	1
WP: Juan Jose Pepe LP: Jose Gustavo Valdez Chaparro; Home runs: ARG: None; MEX: Junior Alexis Flores Del Valle; Boxscore

=== Final ===
23 April 2023 17:00 (ART) Estadio Mundialista de Sóftbol 23 °C (73 °F), cloudy
Team	1	2	3	4	5	6	7	R	H	E
Australia	0	0	0	0	0	0	1	1	4	0
Japan	0	0	0	0	0	0	0	0	4	1
WP: Jack Besgrove LP: Kazuya Umibe; Attendance: 1,554; Boxscore

== Statistics ==
The statistics below include all opening, super and placement round games.

=== Homeruns ===
3 homeruns

- (Czech Republic) Jakub Hajný

2 homeruns

- (Argentina) Juan Cruz Garoli
- (Australia) Ryan King
- (Israel) Bar-Arie Shrim
- (Mexico) Junior Alexis Flores del Valle
- (Singapore) Ean Eu
- (Singapore) Joshua Ri Ming Tan

1 homerun

- (Argentina) Khalil Luna
- (Argentina) Alan Peker
- (Australia) Thomas Cass
- (Australia) Jeremy Garland
- (Australia) Ashlee Goffer
- (Australia) Cody Smith
- (Canada) Isaac Lefebvre
- (Czech Republic) Adam Buchner
- (Czech Republic) Vojtěch Buchner
- (Czech Republic) George Harris
- (Czech Republic) Martin Magula
- (Israel) Shani Hadar
- (Israel) Kfir Leon
- (Japan) Tomoki Kikukawa
- (Mexico) Luis Julian Rodriguez Valdez
- (Mexico) Jordan Solorio
- (Mexico) Iran Francisco Torres Laguna
- (New Zealand) Brock Attewell
- (New Zealand) Huw Davies
- (New Zealand) Brock Evans
- (Singapore) Huzaifie Bin Mohammad Noorham
- (Singapore) Shun Kai Cheoh

=== Leading players ===
Hitting leaders
Stat	Player	Total
AVG	(Guatemala) Nery Del Cid	.579
HR	(Czech Republic) Jakub Hajný	3
RBI	(Czech Republic) Jakub Hajný	8
R	(Argentina) Alan Peker	8
H	(Guatemala) Nery Arnoldo Jr. Del Cid Natareno	11
SB	(Argentina) Luciano Biondi	6

Pitching leaders
Stat	Player	Total
W	(Australia) Jack Besgrove	6
L	(Guatemala) Diego Morales	6
ERA	(Argentina) Juan Jose Pepe	0.65
SO	(Australia) Jack Besgrove	82
IP	(Australia) Jack Besgrove	48
SV	(Argentina) Juan Jose Pepe (New Zealand) Floyd Nola	2

== Final standings ==
Rk	Team	W	L	Final result
1	Australia	7	2	Gold medal
2	Japan	7	2	Silver medal
3	Argentina (H)	7	2	Bronze medal
4	Mexico	6	3	Fourth place
5	Canada	3	5	Super Round
6	New Zealand	4	4	Super Round
7	Czech Republic	5	3	Placement Round
8	Venezuela	5	3	Placement Round
9	Singapore	2	6	Placement Round
10	Israel	2	6	Placement Round
11	Guatemala	1	7	Placement Round
12	South Africa	1	7	Placement Round

== Awards ==
All World Team
Awards		Awarded player
MVP Award		(Australia) Jack Besgrove
All World Team	Pitcher (LHP)	(Australia) Jack Besgrove
All World Team	Pitcher (RHP)	(Argentina) Juan Jose Pepe
All World Team	Catcher	(Canada) Mitchell McKay
All World Team	First baseman	(New Zealand) Brock Attewell
All World Team	Second baseman	(New Zealand) Brock Evans
All World Team	Third baseman	(Australia) Riley James
All World Team	Shortstop	(Guatemala) Nery Del Cid
All World Team	Left fielder	(Australia) Ryan King
All World Team	Center fielder	(Mexico) Jordan Solorio
All World Team	Right fielder	(Japan) Koki Sato
All World Team	Designated player	(Japan) Tomoki Kikukawa

== Symbols ==
=== Match balls ===
The match balls that will be used for the 2024 tournament are the Mizuno M170 balls.
