= Jack Besgrove =

Australian softball player

Personal information
- Full name: Jack Edward Besgrove
- Nationality: Australian
- Born: 17 December 2003 (age 22) Bathurst, Australia
- Height: 1.90 m (6 ft 3 in)
- Weight: 100 kg (220 lb)

Sport
- Country: Australia
- Sport: Softball
- Club: New South Wales Softball Association
Medal record
Men's softball
Representing Australia
Men's Softball World Cup
Gold medal – first place	2022 Auckland
U-23 Men's Softball World Cup
Gold medal – first place	2023 Paraná
Silver medal – second place	2026 Sincelejo
U-18 Men's Softball World Cup
Silver medal – second place	2020 Palmerston North

Jack Edward Besgrove (born 17 December 2003) is an Australian softball player who is a left handed pitcher for the Australia men's national softball team.

== Early life ==
Jack Besgrove was born on 17 December 2003 in Bathurst, New South Wales where he attended St Stanislaus' College.

== Club career ==
Besgrove plays for both Southern Districts Softball Association and New South Wales Softball Association. In 2023 he played for the New York Gremlins, winning both the USA Softball National Championship and the International Softball Congress.

== International career ==
In 2020, Besgrove was selected for Australia U-18 at the 2020 U-18 Men's Softball World Cup in Palmerston North. He took part in 4 games with Australia finishing 2nd. Besgrove was selected as part of the 2022 Men's Softball World Championship squad for Australia. He played 8 games as Australia won their second title with Besgrove playing the entire of the final. In 2023 he was selected for the 2023 U-23 Men's Softball World Cup in Paraná. Australia won the tournament and Besgrove was selected MVP and in the All World Team.

== Career statistics ==
=== World Cups ===
National team	Year	W	L	GP	GS	CG	SHO	SV	IP	H	R	ER	BB	SO	ERA
Australia U-18	2020	2	0	4	0	0	0	0	10.2	6	7	4	3	13	1.40
Australia U-23	2023	6	1	7	6	5	2	0	48.0	19	9	8	8	82	1.17
Australia U-23	2026	5	1	7	6	4	2	0	42.1	15	9	5	21	83	0.83
Australia	2022	4	1	8	6	2	1	0	34.2	18	15	10	14	71	2.02
Australia	2025 Group	3	1	6	4	3	0	1	33.2	20	7	6	6	70	1.25
Australia	2025 Finals	2	2	4	4	4	0	0	20.1	25	16	15	4	29	5.16

== Honours ==
NSW Tropics

- NSW Men's State League: 2022

NSW State Team

- John Reid Shield: 2022, 2023

NY Gremlins

- USA Softball National Championship: 2023, 2024
- International Softball Congress: 2023

Daiwa Act

- Japan Men's Softball League: 2024

Australia U18

- U-18 Men's Softball World Cup Runner-up: 2020

Australia U23

- U-23 Men's Softball World Cup: 2023 Winner
- U-23 Men's Softball World Cup: 2026 Runner-up

Australia

- Men's Softball World Cup: 2022

Individual

- U-23 Men's Softball World Cup MVP: 2023
- U-23 Men's Softball World Cup All World Team: 2023, 2026
- Player of the John Reid Shield Grand Final: 2022, 2023
- John Reid Shield Rookie of the year: 2022
- NSW Softball Open Men's Player of the Year: 2023
- SNSW Men's State League Best Pitcher: 2022
- ISC First Team All World: 2023
- Kevin Herlihy Newcomer Award: 2023
- Leroy Zimmerman Most Outstanding Pitcher: 2023
- USA Softball National Championships All-American First Team: 2024
