= Rosedale Park, New Zealand =

Softball stadium in New Zealand

Rosedale Park
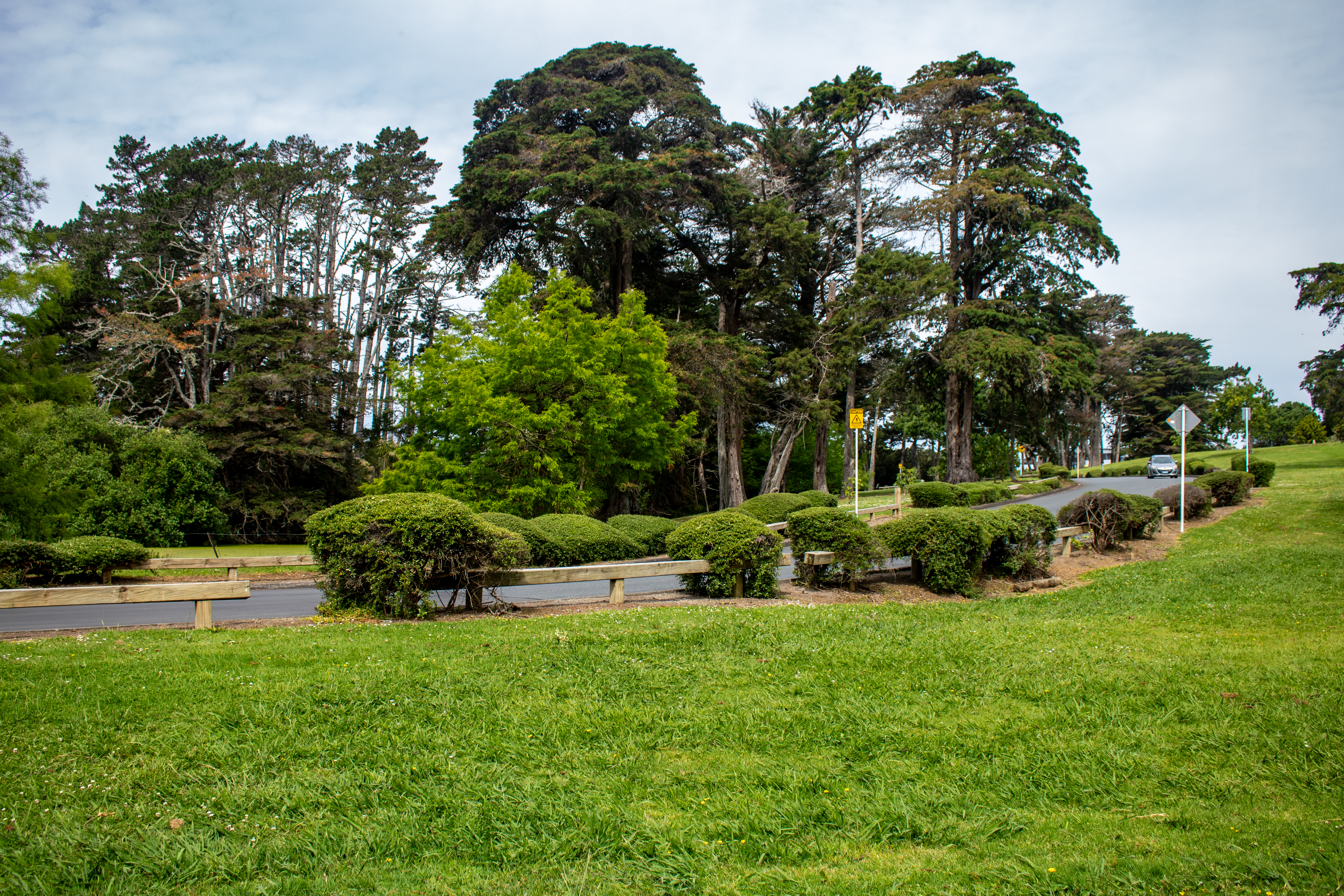
- Drive through Rosedale Park
- Interactive map of Rosedale Park
- Type: Urban park
- Location: 2 Jack Hinton Drive, Rosedale, Auckland
- Coordinates: 36°44′47.3″S 174°42′36.1″E
- Operator: Auckland Council
- Website: Auckland Council

Rosedale Park, is a reserve and sports ground in the suburb of Rosedale in Auckland, New Zealand. It is the home ground of NRFL Northern Conference side Albany United, North Harbour Softball and North Harbour Hockey.

Rosedale park also has a playground, fitness equipment, picnic tables, and a 9-hole frisbee golf course.

== History ==
As of 2022, Urban Solutions have started planning new pedestrian and cycling paths to encourage locals to walk while creating a safe environment for them to do so.

A five year project run by Te Hōnonga a Iwi is currently underway to restore 4000 square metres of Rosedale Park using bio-organic principles.

=== Hockey ===
North Harbour Hockey Stadium
- National Hockey Stadium
- Interactive map of North Harbour Hockey Stadium
- Operator: North Harbour Hockey
- Capacity: 450 (permanent); 10,000 (temporary)

Construction
- Opened: 13 December 2019; 6 years ago
- Architect: Pacific Environments Architects

Tenant
- North Harbour (hockey) (2019—present)

In 1975, six hockey fields were built for the North Shore Women's Hockey Association. In 1988 an artificial sand turf was built at Rosedale Park North. North Shore City Council built a new hockey complex at Rosedale Park South from 1996-97. Two new water turfs were also constructed. This saw the North Harbour hockey clubs make the move to the new facility, giving up their leases on the grass fields. From 1998 to 2000, the pavilion was completed. A third artificial water turf was built in 2004-05 in the South part of the Park, making it the largest hockey centre in New Zealand.

In 2014, after more than two years of planning, $4 million of funding was granted along with a resource consent to upgrade the Rosedale Park facility, to make it the National Hockey Centre.

With upgrades to the State Highway 1 and State Highway 18 connection (the Northern Corridor Improvements), this forced North Harbour Hockey, Rosedale Pony Club and Harbour BMX to relocate. The new motorway needed part of the Hockey grounds for the new roading so North Harbour Hockey was relocated to Bush Road. This meant Harbour BMX were forced to move to their new location at Hooton Reserve, where the first international standard BMX track in New Zealand was built for $4.5Million, opening on 6 November 2018. The North Harbour Pony Club meanwhile merged with the Greenhithe, Rosedale and Whenuapai Pony Clubs to form the new Wainoni Park Pony Club. The new North Harbour Hockey Stadium was completed in 2019 as part of a $75 million project. This was opened by Auckland Mayor Phil Goff and Sport and Recreation Minister Grant Robertson cut the ribbon to open the new North Harbour Hockey stadium.

=== Softball ===
Whakaata Māori Stadium
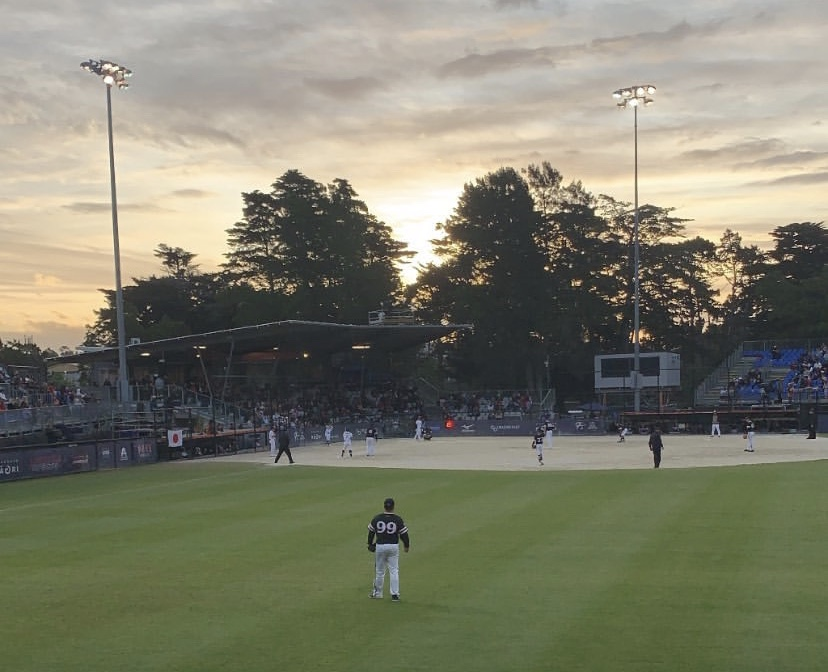
- The stadium on a matchday in 2022
- Interactive map of Whakaata Māori Stadium
- Former names: North Harbour Softball Stadium (2013-2022)
- Operator: North Harbour Softball Association
- Capacity: 500 (permanent); 3,500 (temporary)
- Field size: Left field — 250 feet (76 m); Center field — 250 feet (76 m); Right field — 250 feet (76 m); Backstop — 25 feet (8 m)

Construction
- Opened: 2013; 13 years ago
- Cost: NZD $2 million
- Architect: Team Avery Architects
- General contractor: Monarc (Precast Concrete Panels)

In 1976, North Harbour Softball made the move to Rosedale Park making it the largest area in New Zealand for softball with 20 grass diamonds.

In 1983 along with North Shore Women's Hockey clubrooms were built to help with the proliferation of both clubs. The single-storey building was officially opened in September that year by the then Mayor of Takapuna, Fred Thomas. In 1993, a second storey was built which included offices, toilets, a kitchen and a conference area, which was opened by the Mayor of North Shore City, Anne Hartley. In February 1995, the skin diamonds received flood lighting.

North Shore Women's Hockey combined with the men in 1997 and decided to move to the purpose built facilities at Rosedale South in 1997. This partnership between North Harbour Softball and North Harbour Hockey was subsequently dissolved.

A new partnership with Albany United Football Club was formed creating the Rosedale Park Sports Trust in April 1998. Two diamonds were forfeited to North Harbour Hockey in the late 1990s allowing them to create a sand hockey turf. This meant the total number of diamonds was decreased to 18 which are all still present today.

In 2013 North Harbour Softball and Softball New Zealand, hosted the Men's Softball World Championship. In preparation for the tournament a new 500 seat stadium, including realignment of diamond 2 and upgrading of both diamonds to a world-class standard and new scoreboard were built as part of a $2 million project. The clubroom was also upgraded in time for the 2013 event. In 2022, North Harbour again hosted the Men's World Softball Championship with 50 games being played at Rosedale Park across 2 diamonds over 9 days.

== Gallery ==
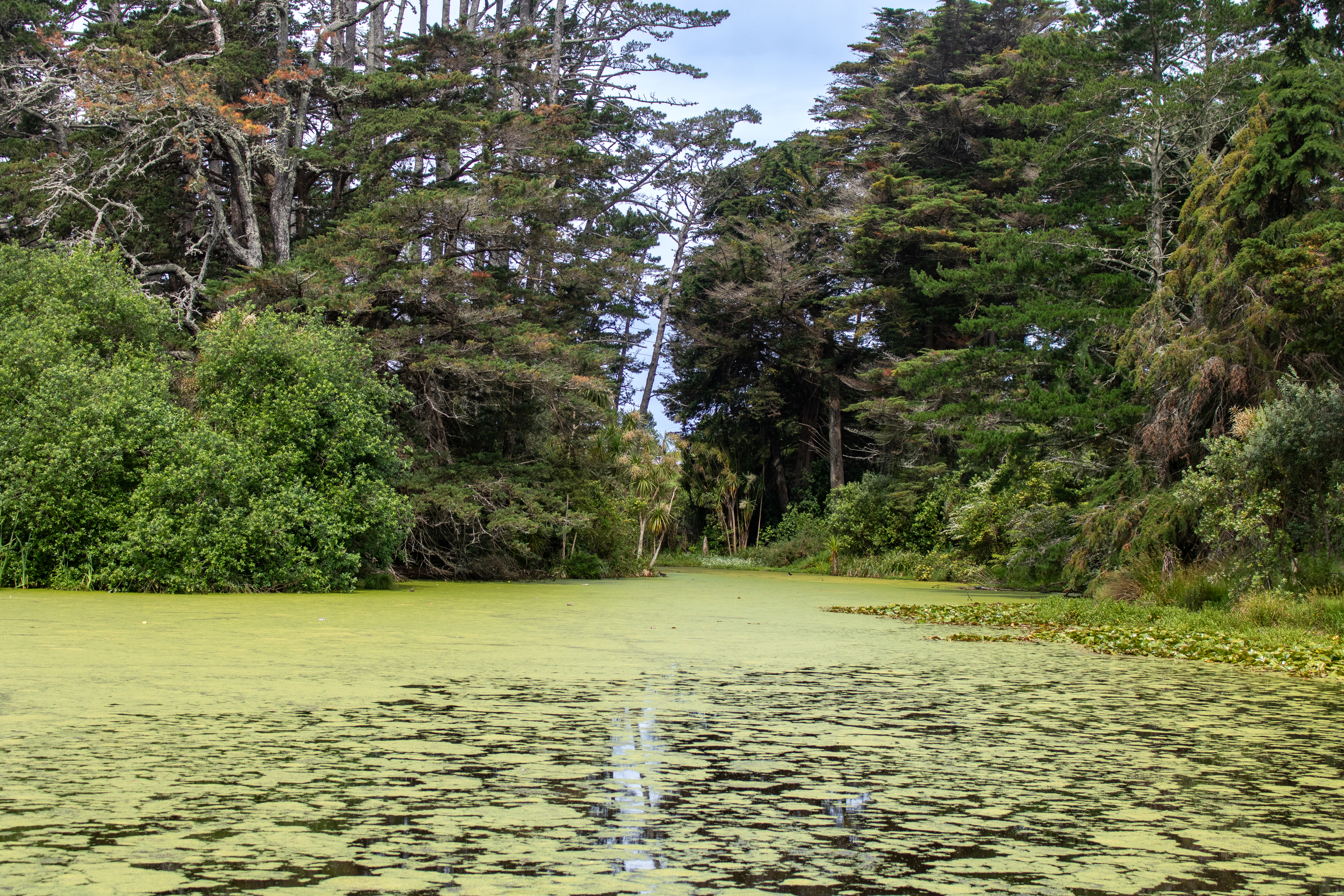
Pond and trees in Rosedale Park

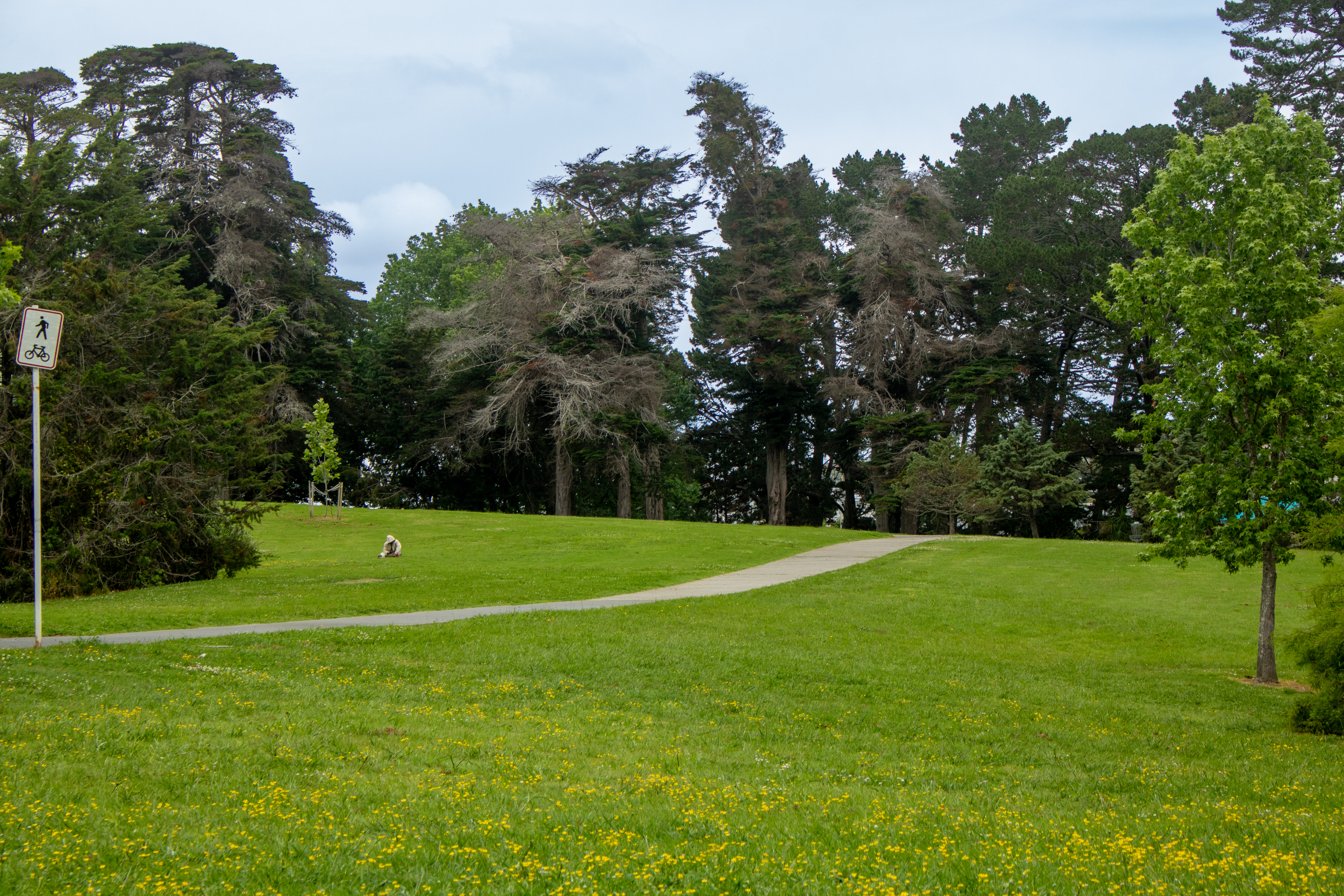
Path through lawn

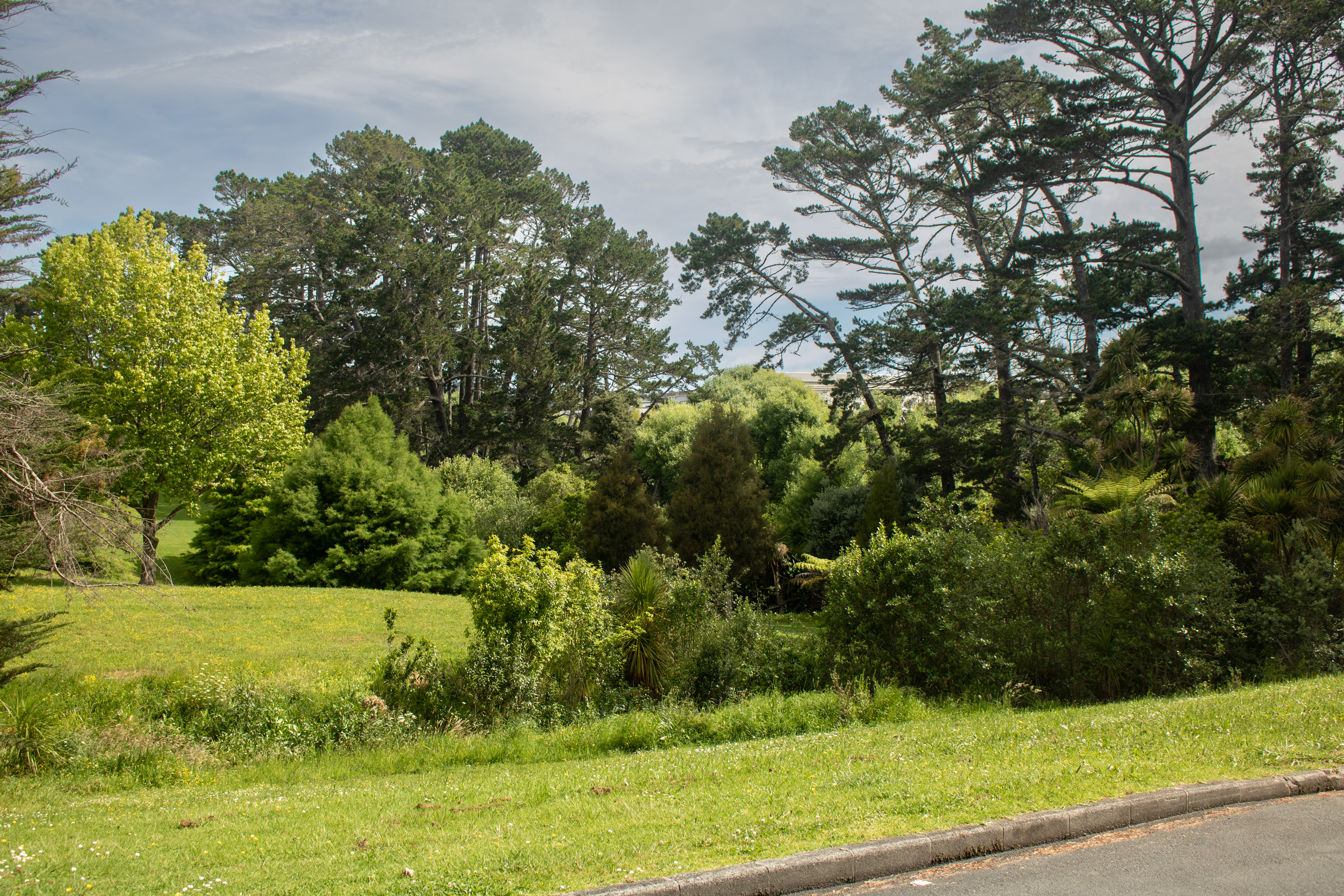
View of various trees

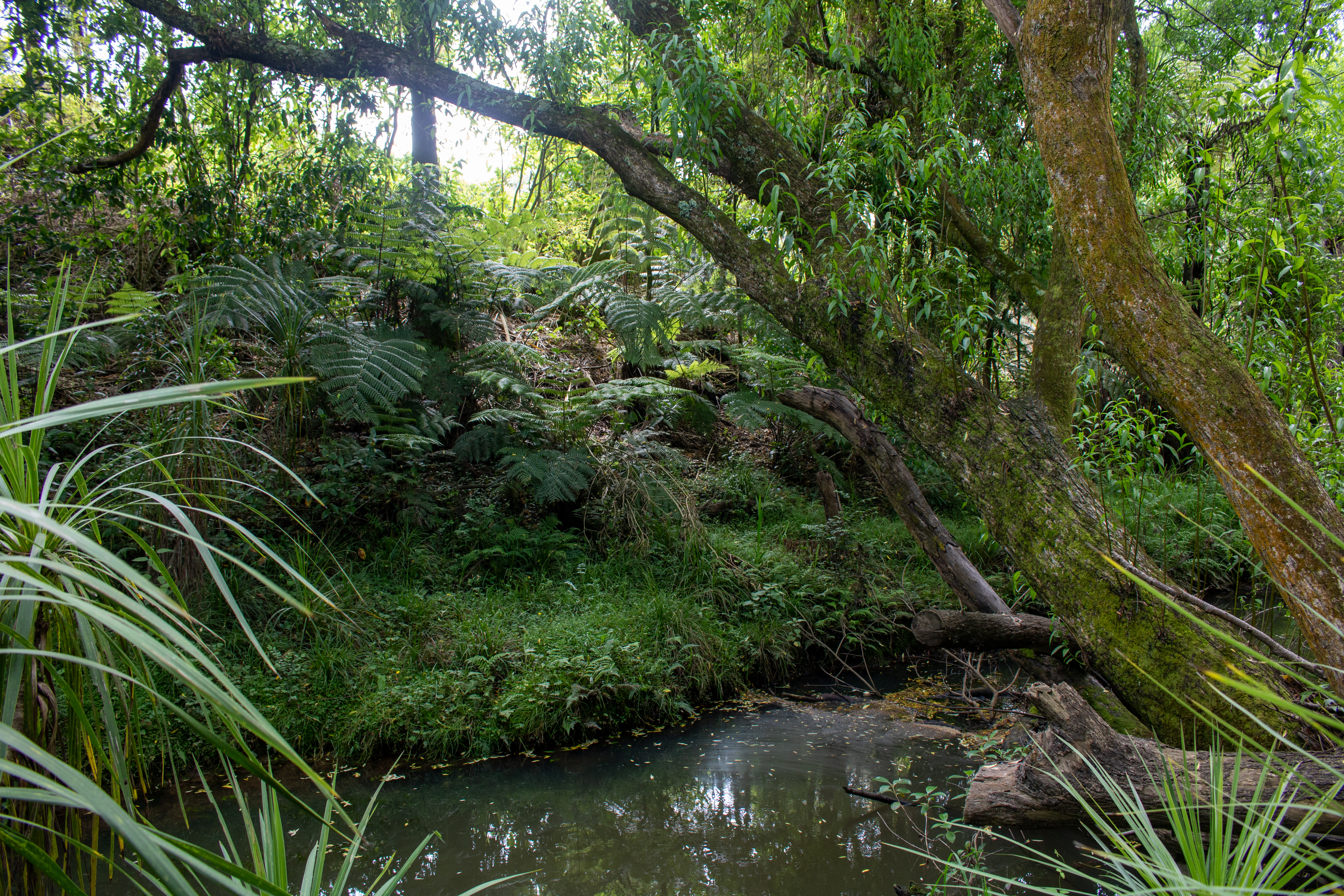
Alexandra Stream

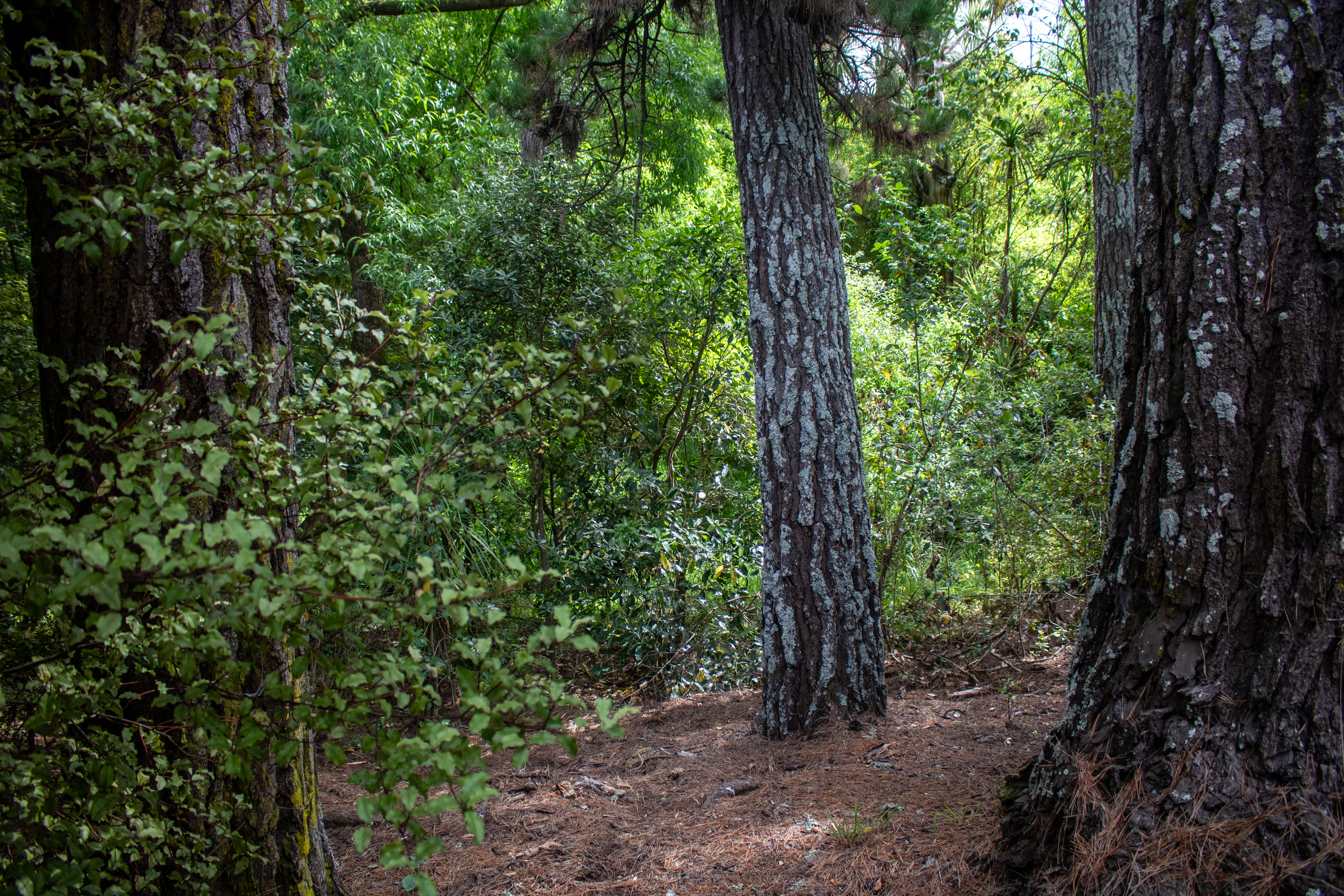
Radiata pine and māpou
