= U-23 Men's Softball World Cup =

Softball championship

- Current season, competition or edition: 2026 U-23 Men's Softball World Cup
- Sport: Softball
- Founded: 2023; 3 years ago
- Organizing body: WBSC
- No. of teams: 12 (Finals)
- Continent: International
- Most recent champions: Japan (1st title) (2026)
- Most titles: Australia; Japan (1 title)
- Related competitions: Men's Softball World Cup
- Website: wbsc.org/u-23-mens-softball-world-cup

The U-23 Men's Softball World Cup is the softball world championship tournament for World Baseball Softball Confederation (WBSC) members’ men's national teams with players under the age of 23, held every four years. The competition will have its inaugural tournament in 2023 in Argentina.

== History ==
The inaugural tournament will be held in Paraná, Argentina from 15 to 23 July 2023. 12 teams will compete in the 2023 event. Due to originally be held in Paraná, Argentina, in October 2022, the tournament was postponed for a number of reasons. The bidding process was reopened and once again awarded to Paraná in Argentina.

== Results ==
Year	Venue	Final			Third place game		
Year	Venue	Champions	Score	Runners-up	Third place	Score	Fourth place
2023; Details^{1}	(Argentina); Paraná	Australia	1–0	Japan	Argentina	10–1	Mexico
2026; Details	(Colombia); Sincelejo	Japan	4–2	Australia	Mexico	11–5	New Zealand

^{1} Originally scheduled to be held in October 2022, but due to a number of reasons, postponed to April 2023.

=== Medal table ===
Rank	Nation	Gold	Silver	Bronze	Total
1	Australia	1	1	0	2
1	Japan	1	1	0	2
3	Argentina	0	0	1	1
3	Mexico	0	0	1	1
Totals (4 entries)		2	2	2	6

== Participating nations ==
- 1st — Champion
- 2nd — Runner-up
- 3rd — Third place
- # — Position
- q — Qualified
- — Hosts

Teams	2023	2026	Years
Argentina	3rd	7th	2
Australia	1st	2nd	2
Canada	5th	8th	2
Colombia	–	10th	1
Czech Republic	7th	6th	2
Denmark	–	9th	1
Guatemala	11th	–	1
Israel	10th	–	1
Japan	2nd	1st	2
Mexico	4th	3rd	2
New Zealand	6th	4th	2
Singapore	9th	11th	2
South Africa	12th	12th	2
Venezuela	8th	5th	2
No. of teams	12	12	

== See also ==
- U-18 Men's Softball World Cup
