= 2022 Men's Softball World Championship =

Tournament details
- Host country: New Zealand
- Dates: 26 November – 4 December 2022
- Teams: 12
- Venue: 1 (in 1 host city)

Final positions
- Champions: Australia (2nd title)
- Runner-up: Canada
- Third place: United States
- Fourth place: Argentina

Tournament statistics
- Games played: 50
- Attendance: 18,055 (361 per game)
- Last updated on complete

The 2022 WBSC Men's Softball World Championship was the 17th Men's Softball World Championship, an international softball tournament taking place in Auckland, New Zealand from 26 November to 4 December 2022. Originally scheduled for February 2021, the tournament was postponed due to the COVID-19 pandemic. New Zealand last hosted the tournament in 2013. It will be the 17th edition of the tournament.

Argentina were the defending champions, and lost the third place playoff to the United States. Australia defeated Canada 5–2 in the final to claim their second World Cup.

== Qualified teams ==
Team	World ranking	Method of qualification
New Zealand	6th	Hosts
South Africa	11th	2022 African Championship
Japan	2nd	2022 Asian Championship
Philippines	21st	2022 Asian Championship
Australia	4th	
Argentina	1st	2022 Pan American Championship
Canada	3rd	2022 Pan American Championship
Cuba	12th	2022 Pan American Championship
United States	7th	2022 Pan American Championship
Czech Republic	5th	2021 European Championship
Denmark	10th	2021 European Championship
Venezuela	9th	Wildcard

== Officials ==
15 umpires were selected by the WBSC for the tournament.

Umpires
Confederation	Umpires
WBSC Africa	Abel Mataboge (Botswana)
WBSC Americas	William Burwell (United States)
WBSC Americas	Geneviève Gaudreau (Canada)
WBSC Americas	Scott McLaren (Canada)
WBSC Asia	Mitsunori Kusamoto (Japan)
WBSC Asia	Naoya Matsuda (Japan)
WBSC Europe	Mariana Atanasova (Netherlands)
WBSC Europe	Jens Jakobsen (Denmark)
WBSC Europe	Michal Zidek (Czech Republic)
WBSC Oceania	Jason Carter (Australia)
WBSC Oceania	Leigh Evans (Australia)
WBSC Oceania	David Fortin (New Zealand)
WBSC Oceania	Mark Porteous (New Zealand)
WBSC Oceania	Lance Brown (New Zealand)
WBSC Oceania	Tony (TK) Kaiaruna (New Zealand)

Umpire Directors
Confederation	Umpire Director
WBSC Americas	Christina Drumm (United States)
Confederation	Assistant Umpire Director
WBSC Oceania	Wayne Saunders (New Zealand)

Scorers
Confederation	Scorers
WBSC Asia	Yu-Wei Horng (Chinese Taipei)
WBSC Asia	Fuka Nakamura (Japan)
WBSC Europe	Feiko Drost (Netherlands)
WBSC Oceania	Kirsty Andrews (Australia)
WBSC Oceania	Marie Byrne (New Zealand)
WBSC Oceania	Carolyn McQueen (New Zealand)
WBSC Oceania	More Natana (New Zealand)
WBSC Oceania	Tracee Topia (New Zealand)
WBSC Oceania	Sharon Williams (New Zealand)

Scorers Director
Confederation	Scorers Director
WBSC Europe	Marco Battistella (Italy)

Technical Commission
Confederation	Technical Commission
WBSC Americas	Ray Gutierrez (United States)
WBSC Asia	Shuro Tsukioka (Japan)
WBSC Europe	Anna Battigeli (Italy)
WBSC Europe	Gabriele Hardinger (Austria)
WBSC Oceania	Rata Joanne (New Zealand)
WBSC Oceania	Leathart Jane (New Zealand)
WBSC Oceania	Clarke Raewyn (New Zealand)

Technical Director
Confederation	Technical Director
WBSC Oceania	Gray Munroe (Australia)

== Venue ==
Rosedale Park in Rosedale, Auckland hosted all the games across two fields.

2022 Men's Softball World Championship is located in New Zealand	Auckland
2022 Men's Softball World Championship is located in New Zealand	Rosedale Park
2022 Men's Softball World Championship is located in New Zealand	Capacity: 3,500

== Opening Round ==
=== Group A ===
Pos	Team	Pld	W	L	RF	RA	RD	PCT	GB	Qualification
1	Argentina	5	5	0	28	7	+21	1.000	—	Super Round
2	United States	5	3	2	19	10	+9	.600 (Note: Head to head results: Cuba 4–8 United States.)	2	Super Round
3	Cuba	5	3	2	15	12	+3	.600	2	Super Round
4	New Zealand (H)	5	2	3	16	20	−4	.400 (Note: Head to head results: New Zealand 3–1 Czech Republic.)	3	Placement Round
5	Czech Republic	5	2	3	8	21	−13	.400	3	Placement Round
6	Philippines	5	0	5	2	18	−16	.000	5	Placement Round

Source: WBSC
Rules for classification: 1) Wins/losses; 2) Head to head; 3) Head to head runs against; 4) Runs against; 5) Head to head
(H) Hosts
Notes:

26 November 2022 13:30 (NZDT) Rosedale Park, Field 1 21 °C (70 °F), sunny
Team	1	2	3	4	5	6	7	R	H	E
New Zealand	0	0	2	0	0	1	0	3	5	0
Czech Republic	0	0	1	0	0	0	0	1	2	3
WP: Daniel Chapman (1–0) LP: Jakub Osička (0–1); Home runs: NZL: Benjamin Enoka (1); CZE: None; Attendance: 1,100; Boxscore

26 November 2022 17:00 (NZDT) Rosedale Park, Field 2 18 °C (64 °F), clear
Team	1	2	3	4	5	6	7	R	H	E
Argentina	0	0	0	0	0	0	3	3	4	0
Cuba	0	0	0	0	1	0	0	1	2	3
WP: Huemul Mata (1–0) LP: Alan Román (0–1) Sv: Roman Godoy (1); Home runs: ARG: None; CUB: Reynaldo Lamote (1); Attendance: 120; Boxscore

26 November 2022 20:00 (NZDT) Rosedale Park, Field 2 18 °C (64 °F), clear
Team	1	2	3	4	5	6	7	R	H	E
Philippines	0	0	0	0	0	0	0	0	3	0
United States	0	0	1	0	0	0	X	1	5	1
WP: Jon Gwizdala (1–0) LP: Leo Barredo (0–1) Sv: Bradley Kilpatrick (1); Attendance: 120; Boxscore

27 November 2022 11:00 (NZDT) Rosedale Park, Field 2 18 °C (64 °F), cloudy/raining
Team	1	2	3	4	5	6	7	R	H	E
Cuba (6)	0	1	1	3	0	2	X	7	8	1
Czech Republic	0	0	0	0	0	0	X	0	4	2
WP: Alain Román (1–1) LP: Jakub Osička (0–2); Home runs: CUB: Miguel Savigne (1); CZE: None; Attendance: 100; Boxscore

27 November 2022 16:20 (NZDT) Rosedale Park, Field 1 17 °C (63 °F), overcast
Team	1	2	3	4	5	6	7	R	H	E
United States	0	1	4	0	0	0	2	7	10	1
New Zealand	0	0	0	0	0	0	0	0	6	0
WP: Bradley Kilpatrick (1–0) LP: Josh Pettett (0–1); Home runs: USA: Blaine Milheim (1), Erick Ochoa (1); NZL: None; Attendance: 1,000; Boxscore

27 November 2022 17:45 (NZDT) Rosedale Park, Field 2 20 °C (68 °F), overcast
Team	1	2	3	4	5	6	7	R	H	E
Philippines	0	0	0	0	0	0	0	0	1	3
Argentina	0	0	0	3	0	3	X	6	10	0
WP: Martín Gonzalez (1–0) LP: Juliuz Dela Cruz (0–1) Sv: Roman Godoy (2); Home runs: PHI: None; ARG: Alan Peker (1); Attendance: 100; Boxscore

28 November 2022 13:30 (NZDT) Rosedale Park, Field 1 19 °C (66 °F), partly cloudy
Team	1	2	3	4	5	6	7	R	H	E
United States	0	0	0	0	0	2	1	3	8	0
Czech Republic	1	2	0	3	0	0	X	6	9	1
WP: Michal Holobrádek (1–0) LP: Jerlin Rutt (0–1); Home runs: USA: Jonathan Lynch (1); CZE: George Harris (1), Tomáš Klein (1); Attendance: 225; Boxscore

28 November 2022 15:00 (NZDT) Rosedale Park, Field 2 18 °C (64 °F), partly cloudy
Team	1	2	3	4	5	6	7	R	H	E
Cuba	0	0	2	0	0	1	0	3	8	2
Philippines	0	0	0	0	1	0	0	1	2	0
WP: Alain Román (2–1) LP: Leo Barredo (0–2) Sv: Guber Plutin (1); Home runs: CUB: Yesander Rodriguez (1); PHI: None; Attendance: 70; Boxscore

28 November 2022 19:30 (NZDT) Rosedale Park, Field 1 16 °C (61 °F), sunny
Team	1	2	3	4	5	6	7	8	9	R	H	E
Argentina (9)	1	0	0	0	0	0	4	0	6	11	7	1
New Zealand	3	0	0	0	0	2	0	0	0	5	7	0
WP: Huemul Mata (2–0) LP: Pita Rona (0–1); Home runs: ARG: Alan Peker (2), Santiago Carril (1); NZL: Cole Evans (1), Thomas Enoka (2); Attendance: 1,050; Boxscore

29 November 2022 12:00 (NZDT) Rosedale Park, Field 2 18 °C (64 °F), cloudy
Team	1	2	3	4	5	6	7	R	H	E
Cuba	0	0	2	0	0	1	1	4	13	2
United States	2	0	4	2	0	0	X	8	8	0
WP: Javier Caballero (1–0) LP: Alain Román (2–2) Sv: Brad Kilpatrick (2); Home runs: CUB: Osvaldo Pérez (1); USA: Jonathan Lynch (2); Attendance: 60; Boxscore

29 November 2022 16:30 (NZDT) Rosedale Park, Field 1 20 °C (68 °F), cloudy
Team	1	2	3	4	5	6	7	R	H	E
Czech Republic	1	0	0	0	0	0	X	1	6	1
Argentina (6)	0	2	3	0	0	3	X	8	10	0
WP: Roman Godoy (1–0) LP: Jonáš Hajný (0–1); Attendance: 200; Boxscore

29 November 2022 19:30 (NZDT) Rosedale Park, Field 1 18 °C (64 °F), overcast
Team	1	2	3	4	5	6	7	R	H	E
Philippines	1	0	0	0	0	X	X	1	1	2
New Zealand (5)	3	0	4	0	1	X	X	8	8	0
WP: Pita Rona (1–1) LP: Juliuz Dela Cruz (0–2); Home runs: PHI: None; NZL: Reilly Makea (1); Attendance: 800; Boxscore

30 November 2022 13:30 (NZDT) Rosedale Park, Field 1 17 °C (63 °F), cloudy
Team	1	2	3	4	5	6	7	R	H	E
United States	0	2	1	0	0	0	0	3	7	0
Argentina	4	0	0	1	0	0	X	5	4	1
WP: Roman Godoy (2–0) LP: Jerlin Rutt (0–2); Home runs: USA: Blaine Milheim (2); ARG: None; Attendance: 232; Boxscore

30 November 2022 15:00 (NZDT) Rosedale Park, Field 2 17 °C (63 °F), wet/overcast/rain possible
Team	1	2	3	4	5	6	7	R	H	E
Czech Republic	0	4	2	0	0	0	0	6	11	0
Philippines	0	0	1	0	0	0	0	1	0	3
WP: Jakub Osička (1–2) LP: Parco Reagan (0–1) Sv: Jonáš Hajný (1); Home runs: CZE: Vojtěch Buchner (1); PHI: None; Attendance: 101; Boxscore

30 November 2022 19:30 (NZDT) Rosedale Park, Field 1 17 °C (63 °F), overcast
Team	1	2	3	4	5	6	7	8	9	R	H	E
New Zealand	0	0	0	0	0	0	0	0	0	0	3	0
Cuba (9)	0	0	0	0	0	0	0	0	1	1	3	1
WP: Alain Román (3–2) LP: Daniel Chapman (1–1); Attendance: 980; Boxscore

=== Group B ===
Pos	Team	Pld	W	L	RF	RA	RD	PCT	GB	Qualification
1	Canada	5	5	0	30	2	+28	1.000	—	Super Round
2	Australia	5	4	1	19	11	+8	.800	1	Super Round
3	Venezuela	5	3	2	17	11	+6	.600	2	Super Round
4	Japan	5	2	3	20	9	+11	.400	3	Placement Round
5	South Africa	5	1	4	6	37	−31	.200	4	Placement Round
6	Denmark	5	0	5	3	25	−22	.000	5	Placement Round

Source: WBSC
Rules for classification: 1) Wins/losses; 2) Head to head; 3) Head to head runs against; 4) Runs against; 5) Head to head

26 November 2022 14:00 (NZDT) Rosedale Park, Field 2 20 °C (68 °F), sunny
Team	1	2	3	4	5	6	7	R	H	E
Venezuela	0	0	2	0	0	0	0	2	4	0
Canada	3	0	0	0	0	0	0	3	6	0
WP: Sean Cleary (1–0) LP: Eudomar Toyo (0–1) Sv: Justin Schofield (1); Attendance: 200; Boxscore

26 November 2022 16:30 (NZDT) Rosedale Park, Field 1 18 °C (64 °F), cloudy
Team	1	2	3	4	5	6	7	R	H	E
Denmark	0	0	0	0	0	0	X	0	4	1
Australia (6)	3	1	0	2	0	1	X	7	6	0
WP: Jack Besgrove (1–0) LP: Kim Hansen (0–1); Attendance: 400; Boxscore

26 November 2022 19:30 (NZDT) Rosedale Park, Field 1 19 °C (66 °F), partly cloudy
Team	1	2	3	4	5	6	7	R	H	E
South Africa	0	0	0	0	X	X	X	0	1	3
Japan (4)	1	4	6	0	X	X	X	11	7	1
WP: Hikaru Matsuda (1–0) LP: Timida Kekana (0–1); Home runs: RSA: None; JAP: Hikaru Matsuda (1); Attendance: 300; Boxscore

27 November 2022 12:00 (NZDT) Rosedale Park, Field 1 18 °C (64 °F), overcast
Team	1	2	3	4	5	6	7	R	H	E
Denmark	0	0	0	0	X	X	X	0	1	0
Canada (4)	2	2	0	6	X	X	X	10	10	0
WP: Zachary Pierce (1–0) LP: Valdemar Terkelsen (0–1); Home runs: DEN: None; CAN: Matthieu Roy (1), Quinten Bruce (1), Bryan Abrey (1), Colin Walsh (1); Attendance: 400; Boxscore

27 November 2022 15:45 (NZDT) Rosedale Park, Field 2 17 °C (63 °F), overcast/chance of rain
Team	1	2	3	4	5	6	7	R	H	E
South Africa	1	0	0	0	X	X	X	1	2	2
Venezuela (4)	5	2	2	3	X	X	X	12	11	0
WP: Victor Guedez (1–0) LP: Tidima Kekana (0–2); Home runs: RSA: Edinson Marrero (1); VEN: None; Attendance: 75; Boxscore

27 November 2022 20:25 (NZDT) Rosedale Park, Field 1 15 °C (59 °F), rainy
Team	1	2	3	4	5	6	7	8	R	H	E
Australia (8)	2	0	0	0	0	1	2	1	6	8	0
Japan	1	2	0	0	2	0	0	0	5	7	1
WP: Marshall Kronk (1–0) LP: Kento Okazaki (0–1); Attendance: 300; Boxscore

28 November 2022 12:00 (NZDT) Rosedale Park, Field 2 17 °C (63 °F), partly cloudy
Team	1	2	3	4	5	6	7	R	H	E
Canada (5)	1	4	2	0	4	X	X	11	9	0
South Africa	0	0	0	0	0	X	X	0	0	4
WP: Ty Seabastian (1–0) LP: Manhlane Manaka (0–1); Home runs: CAN: Colin Walsh (1); RSA: None; Attendance: 100; Boxscore

28 November 2022 16:30 (NZDT) Rosedale Park, Field 1 19 °C (66 °F), sunny
Team	1	2	3	4	5	6	7	R	H	E
Venezuela	0	0	0	0	0	0	0	0	0	0
Australia	3	2	1	0	0	0	X	6	8	0
WP: Jack Besgrove (2–0) LP: Erick Urbaneja (0–1); Attendance: 280; Boxscore

28 November 2022 18:00 (NZDT) Rosedale Park, Field 2 18 °C (64 °F), partly cloudy
Team	1	2	3	4	5	6	7	R	H	E
Denmark	0	0	0	0	0	0	0	0	2	1
Japan	2	0	0	0	1	0	X	3	5	1
WP: Yuya Yamawaki (1–0) LP: Kim Hansen (0–2) Sv: Reo Koyama (1); Attendance: 120; Boxscore

29 November 2022 13:30 (NZDT) Rosedale Park, Field 1 20 °C (68 °F), cloudy
Team	1	2	3	4	5	6	7	R	H	E
Canada	0	1	1	0	0	3	1	6	9	0
Australia	0	0	0	0	0	0	0	0	2	0
WP: Sean Cleary (2–0) LP: Jack Besgrove (2–1); Home runs: CAN: Derek Mayson 2 (2); AUS: None; Attendance: 350; Boxscore

29 November 2022 15:00 (NZDT) Rosedale Park, Field 2 22 °C (72 °F), cloudy
Team	1	2	3	4	5	6	7	R	H	E
South Africa	0	0	0	4	0	1	0	5	6	1
Denmark	0	0	1	0	2	0	0	3	3	0
WP: Grant Olivier (1–0) LP: Kim Hansen (0–3); Home runs: RSA: Tyler Croft (1); DEN: None; Attendance: 134; Boxscore

29 November 2022 18:00 (NZDT) Rosedale Park, Field 2 20 °C (68 °F), cloudy
Team	1	2	3	4	5	6	7	R	H	E
Japan	0	0	0	0	0	0	1	1	7	2
Venezuela	0	0	0	0	1	2	X	3	5	1
WP: Eudomar Toyo (1–1) LP: Hikaru Matsuda (1–1); Attendance: 120; Boxscore

30 November 2022 12:00 (NZDT) Rosedale Park, Field 2 18 °C (64 °F), overcast
Team	1	2	3	4	5	6	7	R	H	E
Australia (3)	10	2	3	X	X	X	X	15	11	0
South Africa	0	0	0	X	X	X	X	0	3	3
WP: Jay Selu (1–0) LP: Lucas Lamola (0–1); Home runs: AUS: Marshall Kronk (1), James Todhunter (1), Julian Jemmott (1); RSA: None; Attendance: 150; Boxscore

30 November 2022 16:30 (NZDT) Rosedale Park, Field 1 17 °C (63 °F), partly cloudy
Team	1	2	3	4	5	6	7	R	H	E
Japan	0	0	0	0	X	X	X	2	5	3
Canada (4)	1	0	6	0	X	X	X	9	8	0
WP: Justin Schofield (1–0) LP: Reo Koyama (0–1) Sv: Zachary Pierce (1); Home runs: JAP: Tei Hamamoto (1); CAN: Derek Mayson (3), Ty Sebastian (1), Bryan Abrey (1); Attendance: 312; Boxscore

30 November 2022 18:00 (NZDT) Rosedale Park, Field 2 17 °C (63 °F), cloudy
Team	1	2	3	4	5	6	7	R	H	E
Venezuela	2	1	0	0	2	1	2	8	9	1
Denmark	0	2	0	1	0	0	0	3	6	3
WP: Victor Guedez (2–0) LP: Kim Hansen (0–4); Attendance: 30; Boxscore

== Placement Round ==
The bottom three teams from each group progress to the placement round. Head to head results against the other bottom three team from the Opening Round will carry over to help determine final placings. In games between equal seeds, a coin toss determines the home team.

Pos	Team	Pld	W	L	RF	RA	RD	PCT	GB
1	Japan	5	5	0	34	11	+23	1.000	—
2	New Zealand (H)	5	4	1	24	10	+14	.800	1
3	Czech Republic	5	3	2	28	14	+14	.600	2
4	Philippines	5	2	3	17	22	−5	.400	3
5	South Africa	5	1	4	8	35	−27	.200	4
6	Denmark	5	0	5	6	25	−19	.000	5

Source: WBSC
Rules for classification: 1) Wins/losses; 2) Head to head; 3) Head to head runs against; 4) Runs against; 5) Head to head
(H) Hosts

1 December 2022 12:00 (NZDT) Rosedale Park, Field 2 18 °C (64 °F), slightly cloudy
Team	1	2	3	4	5	6	7	R	H	E
Denmark	0	0	0	0	1	0	1	2	4	2
Czech Republic	1	0	1	1	0	4	X	7	6	1
WP: Jakub Osička (2–2) LP: Kim Hansen (0–5); Home runs: DEN: Tobias Homlelund (1); CZE: Vojtěch Forman (1); Attendance: 130; Boxscore

1 December 2022 15:00 (NZDT) Rosedale Park, Field 2
Team	1	2	3	4	5	6	7	R	H	E
Philippines	1	0	0	0	0	2	0	3	7	2
Japan	4	0	0	1	0	3	X	8	9	0
WP: Takuro Kawano (1–0) LP: Juliuz Dela Cruz (0–3); Home runs: PHI: None; JPN: Tei Hamamoto (2), Kazuya Toriyama 3 (3); Attendance: 155; Boxscore

1 December 2022 19:30 (NZDT) Rosedale Park, Field 1 17 °C (63 °F), clear
Team	1	2	3	4	5	6	7	R	H	E
South Africa	0	0	0	0	0	X	X	0	1	1
New Zealand (5)	0	1	3	3	0	X	X	7	5	0
WP: Joshua Pettett (1–1) LP: Grant Olivier (1–1); Home runs: RSA: None; NZL: Jerome Raemaki (1); Attendance: 900; Boxscore

2 December 2022 12:00 (NZDT) Rosedale Park, Field 2 19 °C (66 °F), cloudy
Team	1	2	3	4	5	6	7	R	H	E
South Africa	0	3	0	0	0	X	X	3	3	1
Czech Republic (5)	2	3	1	0	4	X	X	10	9	3
WP: Michal Holobrádek (2–0) LP: Manhlane Manaka (0–2); Home runs: RSA: None; CZE: Marek Malý (1), Vojtěch Forman (2); Attendance: 60; Boxscore

2 December 2022 18:00 (NZDT) Rosedale Park, Field 2 19 °C (66 °F), cloudy
Team	1	2	3	4	5	6	7	R	H	E
Philippines (5)	5	0	1	1	1	X	X	8	7	0
Denmark	0	0	0	0	0	X	X	0	4	3
WP: Leo Barredo (1–2) LP: Lukas Lohmann (0–1); Home runs: PHI: Denmark Bathan (1), Melvin de Castro (1); DEN: None; Attendance: 45; Boxscore

2 December 2022 19:30 (NZDT) Rosedale Park, Field 1 17 °C (63 °F), cloudy
Team	1	2	3	4	5	6	7	R	H	E
Japan	1	0	4	0	2	0	0	7	7	0
New Zealand	0	1	1	2	0	0	0	4	10	1
WP: Hikaru Matsuda (2–1) LP: Daniel Chapman (1–2); Home runs: JPN: Hikaru Matsuda (2); NZL: Reilly Makea (2), Joel Evans (1), Pita Rona (1); Attendance: 1,102; Boxscore

3 December 2022 15:00 (NZDT) Rosedale Park, Field 2
Team	1	2	3	4	5	6	7	R	H	E
Philippines	0	0	0	1	1	0	2	4	10	0
South Africa	0	0	0	0	0	0	0	0	2	2
WP: Leo Barredo (2–2) LP: Grant Olivier (1–2); Home runs: PHI: Justine Rosales (1); RSA: None; Attendance: 55; Boxscore

3 December 2022 16:30 (NZDT) Rosedale Park, Field 1 20 °C (68 °F), sunny
Team	1	2	3	4	5	6	7	R	H	E
Denmark	0	0	1	0	0	0	0	1	5	3
New Zealand	1	0	0	0	0	0	1	2	5	0
WP: Joshua Pettett (2–1) LP: Kim Hansen (0–6); Attendance: 380; Boxscore

4 December 2022 18:00 (NZDT) Rosedale Park, Field 2
Team	1	2	3	4	5	6	7	8	9	10	R	H	E
Czech Republic	0	2	0	0	1	1	0	0	0	0	4	6	1
Japan (10)	0	0	1	2	0	1	0	0	0	1	5	6	0
WP: Hikaru Matsuda (3–1) LP: Jakub Osička (2–3); Home runs: CZE: George Harris (2), Vojtěch Buchner (2); JPN: None; Attendance: 68; Boxscore

== Super Round ==
The top three teams from each group progress to the super round. Head to head results against the other top three team from the Opening Round will carry over to help determine final placings and the four nations that qualify for the Final Round. In games between equal seeds, a coin toss determines the home team.

Pos	Team	Pld	W	L	RF	RA	RD	PCT	GB	Qualification
1	Canada	5	4	1	19	10	+9	.800 (Note: Tied on head to head results. Head-to-head runs against: Canada 5, Australia 6, Argentina 6. Head to head result: Australia 2–0 Argentina.)	—	Advance to Final
2	Australia	5	4	1	23	15	+8	.800	—	Advance to Final
3	Argentina	5	4	1	19	13	+6	.800	—	Advance to Third place play-off
4	United States	5	2	3	28	26	+2	.400	2	Advance to Third place play-off
5	Cuba	5	1	4	9	14	−5	.200	3	
6	Venezuela	5	0	5	7	24	−17	.000	4	

Source: WBSC
Rules for classification: 1) Wins/losses; 2) Head to head; 3) Head to head runs against; 4) Runs against; 5) Head to head
Notes:

1 December 2022 13:30 (NZDT) Rosedale Park, Field 1 19 °C (66 °F), cloudy
Team	1	2	3	4	5	6	7	R	H	E
United States	0	3	0	0	0	0	0	3	7	1
Canada	0	0	0	2	1	1	X	4	8	0
WP: Justin Schofield (2–0) LP: Bradley Kilpatrick (1–1); Home runs: USA: Cameron Schiller (1); CAN: Shane Boland (1); Attendance: 450; Boxscore

1 December 2022 16:30 (NZDT) Rosedale Park, Field 1 17 °C (63 °F), cloudy
Team	1	2	3	4	5	6	7	R	H	E
Cuba	0	0	0	0	0	0	0	0	0	0
Australia	1	0	1	0	0	1	X	3	6	0
WP: Adam Folkard (1–0) LP: Alain Román (3–3); Home runs: CUB: None; AUS: Nick Shailes (1), Hayden Mathews (1); Attendance: 182; Boxscore

1 December 2022 18:00 (NZDT) Rosedale Park, Field 2 17 °C (63 °F), cloudy
Team	1	2	3	4	5	6	7	R	H	E
Venezuela	0	0	1	0	2	0	0	3	7	1
Argentina	2	0	1	1	0	2	X	6	12	0
WP: Huemul Mata (3–0) LP: Eudomar Toyo (1–2); Home runs: VEN: Rafael Flores (1); ARG: Alan Peker (3); Attendance: 85; Boxscore

2 December 2022 13:30 (NZDT) Rosedale Park, Field 1 19 °C (66 °F), cloudy
Team	1	2	3	4	5	6	7	R	H	E
United States	3	2	0	0	2	2	0	9	9	1
Australia	1	3	2	0	3	3	X	12	12	1
WP: Adam Folkard (2–0) LP: Bradley Kilpatrick (1–2) Sv: Marshall Kronk (1); Home runs: USA: Matt Palazzo (1), Blaine Milheim (3); AUS: Scott Patterson (1), Nick Shailes (2), Joshua McGovern (1), James Todhunter (2); Attendance: 622; Boxscore

2 December 2022 15:00 (NZDT) Rosedale Park, Field 2 18 °C (64 °F), sunny
Team	1	2	3	4	5	6	7	R	H	E
Venezuela	0	0	0	1	0	0	0	1	5	1
Cuba	0	0	0	0	0	4	X	4	9	0
WP: Alain Román (4–3) LP: Victor Guedez (2–1); Attendance: 55; Boxscore

2 December 2022 16:30 (NZDT) Rosedale Park, Field 1 20 °C (68 °F), cloudy
Team	1	2	3	4	5	6	7	R	H	E
Canada	0	0	0	2	2	0	0	4	7	0
Argentina	0	0	4	0	1	0	X	5	7	1
WP: Huemul Mata (4–0) LP: Justin Schofield (2–1); Home runs: CAN: Bradley Ezekiel (1), Bryan Abrey (2); ARG: Manuel Godoy (1); Attendance: 750; Boxscore

3 December 2022 12:00 (NZDT) Rosedale Park, Field 2 19 °C (66 °F), sunny
Team	1	2	3	4	5	6	7	R	H	E
Venezuela	0	0	0	0	0	1	0	1	3	1
United States	1	1	0	2	0	1	X	5	10	0
WP: Bradley Kilpatrick (2–2) LP: Frank Ugas (0–1); Attendance: 75; Boxscore

3 December 2022 13:30 (NZDT) Rosedale Park, Field 1
Team	1	2	3	4	5	6	7	R	H	E
Cuba	0	0	0	0	0	0	0	0	1	2
Canada	1	0	0	1	0	0	X	2	1	0
WP: Sean Cleary (3–0) LP: Guber Plutin (0–1); Attendance: 300; Boxscore

3 December 2022 19:30 (NZDT) Rosedale Park, Field 1 18 °C (64 °F), partly cloudy
Team	1	2	3	4	5	6	7	8	R	H	E
Australia (8)	0	0	0	0	0	0	0	2	2	5	0
Argentina	0	0	0	0	0	0	0	0	0	2	1
WP: Jack Besgrove (3–1) LP: Roman Godoy (2–1); Attendance: 426; Boxscore

== Final Round ==
=== Third place play-off ===
4 December 2022 13:00 (NZDT) Rosedale Park, Field 1 20 °C (68 °F), sunny
Team	1	2	3	4	5	6	7	R	H	E
United States	0	0	0	0	2	0	0	2	6	0
Argentina	0	0	0	0	0	0	0	0	6	0
WP: Bradley Kilpatrick (3–2) LP: Huemul Mata (4–1); Home runs: USA: Yusef Davis Jr. (1); ARG: None; Attendance: 625; Boxscore

=== Final ===
4 December 2022 16:00 (NZDT) Rosedale Park, Field 1 20 °C (68 °F), sunny
Team	1	2	3	4	5	6	7	R	H	E
Australia	2	0	1	0	0	2	0	5	8	1
Canada	0	0	0	0	1	0	1	2	4	2
WP: Jack Besgrove (4–1) LP: Sean Cleary (3–1); Home runs: AUS: Nick Shailes (3); CAN: None; Attendance: 2,061; Boxscore

== Statistics ==
The statistics below include all opening, super and placement round games.

=== Homeruns ===
3 homeruns

- (Argentina) Alan Peker
- (Australia) Nick Shailes
- (Canada) Bryan Abrey
- (Canada) Derek Mayson
- (Japan) Kazuya Toriyama
- (United States) Blaine Milheim

2 homeruns

- (Australia) James Todhunter
- (Canada) Colin Walsh
- (Czech Republic) Vojtěch Buchner
- (Czech Republic) Vojtěch Forman
- (Czech Republic) George Harris
- (Japan) Tei Hamamoto
- (Japan) Hikaru Matsuda
- (New Zealand) Reilly Makea
- (United States) Jonathan Lynch

1 homerun

- (Argentina) Santiago Carril
- (Argentina) Manuel Godoy
- (Australia) Julian Jemmott
- (Australia) Marshall Kronk
- (Australia) Hayden Mathews
- (Australia) Joshua McGovern
- (Australia) Scott Patterson
- (Canada) Shane Boland
- (Canada) Quinten Bruce
- (Canada) Bradley Ezekiel
- (Canada) Mathieu Roy
- (Canada) Ty Sebastian
- (Cuba) Reynaldo Lamote
- (Cuba) Osvaldo Pérez
- (Cuba) Yesander Rodriguez
- (Cuba) Miguel Savigne
- (Czech Republic) Tomáš Klein
- (Czech Republic) Marek Malý
- (Denmark) Tobias Holmelund
- (New Zealand) Benjamin Enoka
- (New Zealand) Thomas Enoka
- (New Zealand) Cole Evans
- (New Zealand) Joel Evans
- (New Zealand) Jerome Raemaki
- (New Zealand) Pita Rona
- (Philippines) Denmark Bathan
- (Philippines) Melvin de Castro
- (Philippines) Justine Rosales
- (Philippines) Melvin de Castro
- (South Africa) Tyler Croft
- (United States) Yusef Davis Jr.
- (United States) Erick Ochoa
- (United States) Matt Palazzo
- (United States) Cameron Schiller
- (Venezuela) Rafael Flores
- (Venezuela) Edinson Marrero

=== Leading players ===
Hitting leaders
Stat	Player	Total
AVG	(Canada) Quinten Bruce	.550
HR	6 players	3
RBI	(Canada) Bryan Abrey	11
R	(Australia) Scott Patterson	10
H	(United States) Blaine Milheim (United States) Jonathan Lynch	14
SB	(Argentina) Alan Peker (United States) Yusef Davis Jr.	3

Pitching leaders
Stat	Player	Total
W	(Argentina) Huemul Mata (Australia) Jack Besgrove (Cuba) Alain Román	4
L	(Denmark) Kim Hansen	6
ERA	(Argentina) Roman Godoy	1.04
SO	(Australia) Jack Besgrove	71
IP	(Cuba) Alain Román	40.2
SV	(Argentina) Roman Godoy (Cuba) Guber Plutin (United States) Bradley Kilpatrick	2

=== Player of the day ===
Player of the day
Day	Player	Notes
26 Nov	(Argentina) Juan Zara	1–4; 2B; 2 RBI
27 Nov	(United States) Blaine Milheim	2–4; HR; 2 RBI; 2 R
28 Nov	(Argentina) Huemel Mata	7.2 IP; 15 K 1–3; 1 RBI; 1 R
29 Nov	(Canada) Derek Mayson	3–4; 2 HR; 3 RBI; 2 R
30 Nov	(Cuba) Alain Román	9 IP; 3 H 0 R 11 K
1 Dec	(Australia) Adam Folkard	4 IP; 0 H 0 R 0 BB; 8 K
2 Dec	(Australia) Scott Patterson	3–4; 3 RBI; 3 R HR; 3B
3 Dec	(Canada) Sean Cleary	7 IP; 1 H 0 R 15 K

== Final standings ==
Rk	Team	W	L	Final result
1	Australia	8	1	Gold medal
2	Canada	7	2	Silver medal
3	United States	5	4	Bronze medal
4	Argentina	7	2	Fourth place
5	Cuba	4	4	Super Round
6	Venezuela	3	5	Super Round
7	Japan	5	3	Placement Round
8	New Zealand (H)	4	4	Placement Round
9	Czech Republic	4	4	Placement Round
10	Philippines	2	6	Placement Round
11	South Africa	1	7	Placement Round
12	Denmark	0	8	Placement Round

== Awards ==
All World Team
Awards		Awarded player
MVP Award		(Australia) Marshall Kronk
Best Defensive Player Honours		(Cuba) Luis Dominguez
All World Team	Pitcher	(Canada) Sean Cleary
All World Team	Catcher	(Argentina) Juan Zara
All World Team	First baseman	(Venezuela) Erwin Diaz
All World Team	Second baseman	(Australia) Brendon O'Byrne
All World Team	Third baseman	(Australia) Nick Shailes
All World Team	Shortstop	(Argentina) Juan Malarczuk
All World Team	Left fielder	(United States) Jonathan Lynch
All World Team	Center fielder	(United States) Blaine Milheim
All World Team	Right fielder	(Canada) Quinten Bruce
All World Team	Designated player	(Canada) Bryan Abrey

== Broadcasting ==
Whakaata Māori broadcast all 50 games on the MĀORI+ app with all New Zealand games also on television. International viewers were able to stream the tournament on WBSC's OTT Channel GameTime.

== Symbols ==
=== Match balls ===
The match balls used for the 2022 tournament were the Mizuno M150 balls, which were also used in the Tokyo 2022 Olympics. Mizuno supplied 1,152 balls for the tournament.
