= 2026 U-23 Men's Softball World Cup =

International softball tournament

Tournament details
- Host country: Colombia
- Dates: 25 April – 3 May 2026
- Teams: 12
- Venues: 2 (in 1 host city)
- Defending champions: Australia

Final positions
- Champions: Japan (1st title)
- Runner-up: Australia
- Third place: Mexico
- Fourth place: New Zealand

The 2026 WBSC U-23 Men's Softball World Cup will be the second edition of the U-23 Men's Softball World Cup held in Sincelejo, Colombia, from April 23 to May 3, and will feature 12 national teams from five continents.

This tournament marks the first time Colombia has hosted a WBSC softball tournament.

== Venues ==
The tournament will be held at Estadio Eduardo Porras Arrazola and Estadio 20 de Enero.

== Qualification ==
Event	Dates	Location(s)	Berth(s)	Qualified
Host nation	—N/a	—N/a	1	Colombia
2025 U-23 Oceania Championship	4–6 April 2025	(New Zealand) Palmerston North	2	New Zealand; Australia
2025 U-23 Asia Cup	2–5 June 2025	(Thailand) Bangkok	2	Japan; Singapore
2025 U-23 European Championship	1–5 July 2025	(Czech Republic) Kunovice	2	Czech Republic; Denmark
2025 U-23 Pan American Championship	13–20 September 2025	(Argentina) La Pampa	4	Argentina; Mexico; Canada; Venezuela
2025 U-23 Africa Championship	25–27 November 2025	(Kenya) Nairobi	1	South Africa
Total			12	

== First round ==
=== Group A ===
Pos	Team	Pld	W	L	RF	RA	PCT	GB	Qualification
1	Japan	5	4	1	50	7	.800 (Note: Head-to-head result: Japan 3–1 New Zealand)	—	Advance to super round
2	New Zealand	5	4	1	35	11	.800	—	Advance to super round
3	Czech Republic	5	3	2	35	24	.600 (Note: Head-to-head result: Czech Republic 9–4 Argentina)	1	Advance to super round
4	Argentina	5	3	2	28	27	.600	1	Advance to placement round
5	Colombia (H)	5	1	4	10	50	.200	3	Advance to placement round
6	South Africa	5	0	5	12	51	.000	4	Advance to placement round

Source: WBSC
(H) Hosts
Notes:

Date	Local time	Road team	Score	Home team	Inn.	Venue	Game duration	Attendance	Boxscore
Apr 25, 2026	10:00	Argentina	2–10	New Zealand	F/5	Eduardo Porras Arrazola	1:49	1,513	Boxscore
Apr 25, 2026	13:00	Czech Republic	3–11	Japan	F/5	Eduardo Porras Arrazola	1:45	1,200	Boxscore
Apr 25, 2026	20:00	Colombia	9–4	South Africa		Estadio 20 de Enero	2:38	10,000	Boxscore
Apr 26, 2026	17:00	South Africa	2–9	New Zealand	F/5	Estadio 20 de Enero	1:40	6,200	Boxscore
Apr 26, 2026	19:00	Argentina	3–2	Japan		Eduardo Porras Arrazola	2:28	2,532	Boxscore
Apr 26, 2026	20:00	Colombia	1–11	Czech Republic	F/4	Estadio 20 de Enero	1:52	8,401	Boxscore
Apr 27, 2026	13:00	Japan	14–0	South Africa	F/4	Eduardo Porras Arrazola	1:25	234	Boxscore
Apr 27, 2026	18:00	Czech Republic	9–4	Argentina		Estadio 20 de Enero	2:47	6,783	Boxscore
Apr 27, 2026	21:00	New Zealand	7–0	Colombia		Estadio 20 de Enero	2:11	9,463	Boxscore
Apr 28, 2026	14:00	South Africa	0–8	Czech Republic	F/5	Estadio 20 de Enero	1:34	327	Boxscore
Apr 28, 2026	19:00	New Zealand	1–3	Japan		Eduardo Porras Arrazola	2:00	1,954	Boxscore
Apr 28, 2026	20:00	Colombia	0–8	Argentina	F/5	Estadio 20 de Enero	1:58	8,752	Boxscore
Apr 29, 2026	16:00	Czech Republic	4–8	New Zealand		Eduardo Porras Arrazola	2:13	750	Boxscore
Apr 29, 2026	17:00	South Africa	6–11	Argentina		Estadio 20 de Enero	2:43	3,017	Boxscore
Apr 29, 2026	20:00	Japan	20–0	Colombia	F/5	Estadio 20 de Enero	1:58	9,832	Boxscore

=== Group B ===
Pos	Team	Pld	W	L	RF	RA	PCT	GB	Qualification
1	Australia	5	5	0	29	1	1.000	—	Advance to super round
2	Mexico	5	4	1	27	10	.800	1	Advance to super round
3	Venezuela	5	3	2	45	5	.600	2	Advance to super round
4	Canada	5	2	3	29	25	.400	3	Advance to placement round
5	Denmark	5	1	4	10	42	.200	4	Advance to placement round
6	Singapore	5	0	5	5	62	.000	5	Advance to placement round

Source: WBSC

Date	Local time	Road team	Score	Home team	Inn.	Venue	Game duration	Attendance	Boxscore
Apr 25, 2025	12:00	Singapore	0–15	Venezuela	F/3	Estadio 20 de Enero	1:02	894	Boxscore
Apr 25, 2026	15:00	Canada	3–1	Denmark		Estadio 20 de Enero	2:15	2,432	Boxscore
Apr 25, 2026	16:00	Mexico	0–3	Australia		Eduardo Porras Arrazola	1:55	2,033	Boxscore
Apr 26, 2026	13:00	Singapore	0–10	Mexico	F/4	Eduardo Porras Arrazola	1:25	640	Boxscore
Apr 26, 2026	14:00	Venezuela	17–1	Denmark	F/4	Estadio 20 de Enero	2:29	3,013	Boxscore
Apr 26, 2026	16:00	Australia	5–0	Canada		Eduardo Porras Arrazola	2:04	2,322	Boxscore
Apr 27, 2026	14:00	Australia	2–0	Venezuela		Estadio 20 de Enero	2:14	1,142	Boxscore
Apr 27, 2026	16:00	Denmark	7–5	Singapore		Eduardo Porras Arrazola	2:25	1,102	Boxscore
Apr 27, 2026	19:00	Mexico	7–6	Canada	F/8	Eduardo Porras Arrazola	2:26	1,635	Boxscore
Apr 28, 2026	13:00	Denmark	1–9	Australia	F/5	Eduardo Porras Arrazola	1:42	356	Boxscore
Apr 28, 2026	16:00	Venezuela	1–2	Mexico	F/8	Eduardo Porras Arrazola	2:21	1,201	Boxscore
Apr 28, 2026	17:00	Canada	20–0	Singapore	F/3	Estadio 20 de Enero	1:25	1,035	Boxscore
Apr 29, 2026	13:00	Denmark	0–8	Mexico	F/5	Eduardo Porras Arrazola	1:43	236	Boxscore
Apr 29, 2026	14:00	Singapore	0–10	Australia	F/4	Estadio 20 de Enero	1:08	220	Boxscore
Apr 29, 2026	19:00	Venezuela	12–0	Canada	F/4	Eduardo Porras Arrazola	1:35	2,811	Boxscore

== Super round ==
Pos	Team	Pld	W	L	RF	RA	PCT	GB	Qualification
1	Australia	5	5	0	20	12	1.000	—	Advance to final
2	Japan	5	4	1	22	11	.800	1	Advance to final
3	New Zealand	5	3	2	25	12	.600	2	Advance to third-place game
4	Mexico	5	2	3	11	19	.400	3	Advance to third-place game
5	Venezuela	5	1	4	11	10	.200	4	
6	Czech Republic	5	0	5	16	41	.000	5	

Source: WBSC

Date	Local time	Road team	Score	Home team	Inn.	Venue	Game duration	Attendance	Boxscore
Apr 30, 2026	12:00	Venezuela	9–1	Czech Republic	F/6	Estadio 20 de Enero	2:12	307	Boxscore
Apr 30, 2026	15:00	New Zealand	10–1	Mexico	F/5	Estadio 20 de Enero	2:05	989	Boxscore
Apr 30, 2026	18:00	Australia	6–5	Japan	F/9	Estadio 20 de Enero	3:13	7,342	Boxscore
May 1, 2026	12:00	Venezuela	0–1	Japan		Estadio 20 de Enero	2:11	2,010	Boxscore
May 1, 2026	15:00	New Zealand	2–3	Australia		Estadio 20 de Enero	2:39	4,871	Boxscore
May 1, 2026	18:00	Czech Republic	3–7	Mexico	F/8	Estadio 20 de Enero	2:48	248	Boxscore
May 2, 2026	15:00	Mexico	1–2	Japan		Estadio 20 de Enero	2:00	4,670	Boxscore
May 2, 2026	18:00	Czech Republic	5–6	Australia		Eduardo Porras Arrazola	2:03	8,719	Boxscore
May 2, 2026	18:00	Venezuela	1–4	New Zealand		Estadio 20 de Enero	2:03	8,719	Boxscore

== Placement round ==
Pos	Team	Pld	W	L	RF	RA	PCT	GB
1	Argentina	5	5	0	51	14	1.000	—
2	Canada	5	4	1	43	10	.800	1
3	Denmark	5	3	2	22	30	.600	2
4	Colombia	5	2	3	28	28	.400	3
5	Singapore	5	1	4	18	52	.200	4
6	South Africa	5	0	5	15	43	.000	5

Source: WBSC

Date	Local time	Road team	Score	Home team	Inn.	Venue	Game duration	Attendance	Boxscore
Apr 30, 2026	11:00	South Africa	3–4	Singapore		Eduardo Porras Arrazola	1:39	186	Boxscore
Apr 30, 2026	14:00	Argentina	6–4	Canada		Eduardo Porras Arrazola	2:35	389	Boxscore
Apr 30, 2026	21:00	Colombia	5–6	Denmark	F/8	Estadio 20 de Enero	2:47	2:47	Boxscore
May 1, 2026	11:00	South Africa	1–11	Canada	F/4	Eduardo Porras Arrazola	1:24	63	Boxscore
May 1, 2026	14:00	Denmark	0–16	Argentina	F/3	Eduardo Porras Arrazola	1:16	105	Boxscore
May 1, 2026	21:00	Singapore	5–12	Colombia	F/6	Estadio 20 de Enero	2:05	2,521	Boxscore
May 2, 2026	15:00	Singapore	4–10	Argentina		Eduardo Porras Arrazola	2:13	354	Boxscore
May 2, 2026	21:00	South Africa	1–8	Denmark	F/5	Eduardo Porras Arrazola	1:42	322	Boxscore
May 2, 2026	21:00	Colombia	2–5	Canada		Estadio 20 de Enero	1:52	5,723	Boxscore

== Finals ==
=== Third place game ===
Date	Local time	Road team	Score	Home team	Inn.	Venue	Game duration	Attendance	Boxscore
May 3, 2026	12:00	Mexico	11–5	New Zealand		Estadio 20 de Enero	2:55	4,389	Boxscore

=== Championship ===
Date	Local time	Road team	Score	Home team	Inn.	Venue	Game duration	Attendance	Boxscore
May 3, 2026	16:00	Japan	4–2	Australia		Estadio 20 de Enero	2:17	10,099	Boxscore

== Final standings ==
Rk	Team	W	L
1st place, gold medalist(s)	Japan	7	2
Lost in Final
2nd place, silver medalist(s)	Australia	8	1
Won in 3rd-place game
3rd place, bronze medalist(s)	Mexico	6	3
Lost in 3rd-place game
4	New Zealand	6	3
Failed to qualify for the finals
5	Venezuela	4	4
6	Czech Republic	3	5
Failed to qualify for the super round
7	Argentina	6	2
8	Canada	4	4
9	Denmark	3	5
10	Colombia	2	6
11	Singapore	1	7
12	South Africa	0	8

2026 U-23 Men's Softball World Cup

Japan
1st title

== External websites ==
- Official website
