= Mark Harris (softball) =

Australian softballer

Personal information
- Nationality: Australian
- Born: 29 March 1985 (age 40); Derby, Western Australia

Sport
- Country: Australia
- Sport: Softball
- Event: Men's team
- Club: Australian Steelers

Mark Harris (born 29 March 1985) is an Australian IT administrator, athlete and coach who played softball for the Australian Steelers fastpitch softball team.

Harris was first selected by the Steelers in 2010 to play in a Tri-Series against New Zealand and Argentina at Hawker Park, ACT. Harris played in the 2013 and 2015 World Series Fastpitch Team with the Steelers.

== Personal ==
Harris was born on 29 March 1985 in Derby, Western Australia. Soon after his birth, the Harris family moved to Perth.

Harris attended Sevenoaks Senior College. In 2003, he started attending Edith Cowan University, where he studied Sports Science. After university, In 2009, Harris moved to Melbourne. He is currently working as an IT Projects Administrator for the West Coast Eagles Football Club in Perth.

In 2015 Harris announced his engagement to Leah Brenton in Paris.

== Softball ==
Harris has played catcher, outfielder and occasionally pitcher. Harris originally started in softball as an umpire and then coach, with over 350 games experience. He started playing the sport at the age of 17. In 2003 and 2009, he suffered shoulder injuries that took him out of play, but he recovered from them.

=== Steelers appearances ===
- 2010 - Tri-Series, ACT Canberra - New Zealand, Argentina
- 2011 - Friendship Series, Argentina
- 2012 - 2013 World Series Qualifiers, ACT Canberra - Samoa, PNG
- 2013 - World Series, Auckland New Zealand / Trans-Tasman Series, Auckland New Zealand - New Zealand vs Australia
- 2014 - 2015 World Series Qualifiers, Auckland New Zealand - Samoa, New Zealand
- 2015 - World Series, Saskatoon Canada

=== Western Blaze appearances ===
- 2005 - Tasmania
- 2006 - Sydney
- 2007 - Sydney
- 2008 -
- 2009 -
- 2011 - Brisbane
- 2012 - Sydney
- 2013 - Canberra
- 2014 - Perth
- 2015 - Brisbane

While with the Blaze, Harris won MVP Trophies in 2013 and 2011. He makes appearances behind the dish and also plays Leftfield. In 2014 he made his debut on the pitching rubber which was short lived however, he has since pitched again in 2015 with better results.

=== Coaching ===
- 2004 - SEMSA Association Junior Head Coach, Perth
- 2005 - State Under 19's Assistant Coach, Tasmania
- 2006 - State Under 19's Assistant Coach, Canberra
- 2010 - State Under 16's Head Coach, in Sydney
- 2015 - State Under 17's Head Coach, in Canberra
- 2016 - Appointed as the Under 17's Head Coach, in Perth

Harris had previously attained his coaching certifications and has since re-certified as a level 2 coach. Harris has helped develop softball clinics in Western Australia.

=== Club and Association level ===
Harris started his career at Dale Districts Men's Softball Association in which he's won four Runner-Up MVPs along with one MVP Trophy. He also played with the Bandits, Rebels, Breakaways, Animals, Bayswater and Western Cobras. Most of his club level softball has been with Bayswater Morley Softball Club.

In 2014 Harris was the winner of the Newcrest Softball WA Spirit Award. Over a period of eight years Harris has join Toowoomba Softball Association at the Brisbane State Championships seven times.
