= Cuba men's national softball team =

Cuba national softball team

Information
- Country: Cuba
- Confederation: WBSC Americas
- Manager: Leonardo Cardenas
- WBSC World Rank: 21 (31 December 2025)

Men's Softball World Cup
- Appearances: 2 (First in 1988)
- Best result: 4th

Cuba men's national softball team represents Cuba in international softball competitions. The team played at the 1988 World Championships, which were held in Saskatoon, Canada. They played 13 games in a round robin tournament, and beat Australia 7–4 in one game.

== See also ==
- Cuba women's national softball team
