= Men's Softball Asia Cup =

- Sport: Softballs
- Founded: 1968
- No. of teams: 6 (in 2023)
- Continent: Asia
- Most recent champion: Japan (9th title)
- Most titles: Japan (9 titles)

The Men's Softball Asia Cup, formerly the Asian Men's Softball Championship is the main championship tournament between national men's softball teams in Asia, governed by the Softball Confederation of Asia (WBSC Asia). The 1st Asian Men Softball Championship was held in Manila, Philippines in 1968 but due to unfortunate circumstances, ASA-Asia did not sustain continuous momentum of activities and events for several years. Although the difficulties faced by the asian organizations, efforts in promoting and developing the sport made it possible for the men's competition to be held more regularly from the end of the 20th century onwards.

== Medal table ==
As of 2023 Men's Softball Asia Cup.

Rank	Nation	Gold	Silver	Bronze	Total
1	Japan	10	1	1	12
2	Philippines	3	8	2	13
3	Chinese Taipei	0	2	2	4
4	Singapore	0	1	2	3
5	Indonesia	0	0	3	3
6	Hong Kong	0	0	1	1
Totals (6 entries)		13	12	11	36

== Results ==
#	Year	Host	Final		Semifinalists		Teams
#	Year	Host	Champions	Runners-up	3rd place	4th place	Teams
1	1968	(Philippines); Manila	Philippines	Japan	Taiwan	Hong Kong	5
2	1974	(Philippines); Marikina	Philippines	Japan	Unknown	Unknown	6
3	1985	(Japan); Shizuoka	Japan	Chinese Taipei	Philippines	Indonesia	9
4	1990	(Philippines); Manila	Philippines	Chinese Taipei	Japan	Indonesia	5
5	1994	(Philippines); Manila	Japan	Philippines	Chinese Taipei	Hong Kong	7
6	1998	(Philippines); Manila	Japan	Philippines	Hong Kong	Malaysia	5
7	2003	(Philippines); Manila	Japan	Philippines	Chinese Taipei	Hong Kong	8
8	2006	(Japan); Kitakyushu	Japan	Philippines	Indonesia	Hong Kong	8
9	2012	(Japan); Niimi	Japan	Philippines	Indonesia	Hong Kong	6
10	2014	Singapore	Japan	Philippines	Indonesia	Singapore	6
11	2018	(Indonesia); Jakarta	Japan	Philippines	Singapore	Indonesia	9
12	2022	(Japan); Shimanto	Japan	Philippines	Singapore	India	7
13	2023	(Japan); Kochi	Japan	Singapore	Philippines	Hong Kong	6

== See also ==
- Asian Women's Softball Championship
- U-15 Women Softball Asia Cup
- Women's Baseball Asian Cup
- Asian Baseball Championship

== Links ==
- https://asiasoftball.com/reports/
