= List of sporting events in the Greater Manila Area =

This is a list of international sporting events in the Greater Manila Area in the Philippines:

== Single sport events ==
Year	City / Municipality	Sport	Event
1913	Manila	Multi-sport	1913 Far Eastern Championship Games
1919	Manila	Multi-sport	1919 Far Eastern Championship Games
1925	Manila	Multi-sport	1925 Far Eastern Championship Games
1934	Manila	Multi-sport	1934 Far Eastern Championship Games
1954	Manila	Multi-sport	1954 Asian Games
1960	Manila	Basketball	1960 ABC Championship
1966	Manila	Football	1966 AFC Youth Championship
1966	Manila	Judo	1966 Asian Judo Championships
1968	Manila	Softball	1968 Asian Men's Softball Championship
1969	Manila	Badminton	1969 Asian Badminton Championships
1971	Manila	Weightlifting	1971 Asian Weightlifting Championships
1972	Marikina	Softball	1972 ISF Men's World Championship
1972	Manila	Basketball	1972 ABC Under-18 Championship
1972	Manila	Basketball	1972 ABC Under-18 Championship for Women
1973	Manila	Basketball	1973 ABC Championship
1973	Marikina	Athletics	1973 Asian Athletics Championships
1974	Manila	Softball	1974 Asian Men's Softball Championship
1976	Makati	Golf	1976 Colgate Far East Open
1978	Manila; Quezon City	Basketball	1978 FIBA World Championship
1979	Makati	Golf	1979 Colgate Far East Open
1981	Manila	Multi-sport	1981 Southeast Asian Games
1990	Manila	Softball	1990 Asian Men's Softball Championship
1991	Manila	Multi-sport	1991 Southeast Asian Games
1992	Manila; Pasig	Softball	1992 ISF Men's World Championship
1993	Manila	Athletics	1993 Asian Athletics Championships
1994	Manila	Softball	1994 Asian Men's Softball Championship
1995	Manila	Basketball	1995 ABC Under-18 Championship
1995	Dasmariñas, Cavite	Golf	1995 Johnnie Walker Classic
1995	Manila	Wrestling	1995 Asian Wrestling Championships
1995	Pasay	Taekwondo	1995 World Taekwondo Championships
1996	Manila	Basketball	1996 ABC Champions Cup
1996	Santa Cruz, Laguna	Basketball	1996 SEABA Under-18 Championship
1996	Biñan, Laguna	Golf	1996 Eisenhower Trophy
1997	Manila	Judo	1997 Asian Judo Championships
1997	Manila	Volleyball	1997 Asian Women's Volleyball Championship
1997	Manila	Volleyball	1997 Asian Youth Boys Volleyball Championship
1998	Manila	Softball	1998 Asian Men's Softball Championship
1999	Manila	Football	1999 AFC Women's Championship
2000	Pasay	Volleyball	2000 Asian Beach Volleyball Championship
2000	Quezon City	Volleyball	2000 FIVB Volleyball World Grand Prix
2001	Manila	Badminton	2001 Asian Badminton Championships
2001	Pasay	Volleyball	2001 Asian Beach Volleyball Championship
2003	Manila	Athletics	2003 Asian Athletics Championships
2003	Manila	Softball	2003 Asian Men's Softball Championship
2005	Quezon City; Pasay; Antipolo, Rizal	Basketball	2005 FIBA Asia Champions Cup
2005	Manila	Multi-sport	2005 Southeast Asian Games
2005	Manila	Multi-sport	2005 ASEAN Para Games
2006	Manila	Volleyball	2006 Asian Women's Club Volleyball Championship
2007	Quezon City	Pool	2007 WPA Men's World Nine-ball Championship
2008	Pasig	Volleyball	2008 Asian Youth Girls Volleyball Championship
2009	Quezon City	Pool	2009 World Cup of Pool
2009	Manila	Volleyball	2009 Asian Men's Volleyball Championship
2010	Manila	Pool	2010 World Cup of Pool
2010	Manila	Basketball	2010 SEABA Championship for Women
2010	Manila	Basketball	2010 MVP Invitational Champions' Cup
2011	Quezon City	Pool	2011 World Cup of Pool
2011	Manila	Football	The Dream Cup: LA Galaxy vs. Philippine Azkals
2012	Manila	Pool	2012 World Cup of Pool
2013	Manila; Pasay	Basketball	2013 FIBA Asia Championship
2013	Pasay	Basketball	NBA Global Games - Rockets vs. Pacers
2014	Mandaluyong	Figure skating	2014 World Development Trophy – Single Skating
2014	Pasay	Volleyball	2014 Asian Men's Club Volleyball Championship
2014	Mandaluyong	Basketball	2014 FIBA 3x3 World Tour Manila Masters
2015	Pasig	Volleyball	2015 Asian Women's U23 Volleyball Championship
2015	Quezon City	Basketball	2015 MVP Cup
2015	Pasay	Mixed martial arts	UFC Fight Night: Edgar vs. Faber
2015	Pasay	Beach volleyball	Philippine Beach Volleyball Invitational
2016	Pasay	Taekwondo	2016 Asian Taekwondo Olympic Qualification Tournament
2016	Pasay	Taekwondo	2016 Asian Taekwondo Championships
2016	Pasay	eSports	ESL One Manila 2016
2016	Pasay	eSports	Manila Major 2016
2016	Pasay	Basketball	2016 FIBA World Olympic Qualifying Tournament
2016	Quezon City	Mixed martial arts	WSOF Global Championship 3: Philippines
2016	Pasay	Volleyball	2016 Asian Women's Club Volleyball Championship
2016	Pasay	Volleyball	2016 FIVB Volleyball Women's Club World Championship
2016	Manila	Football	2016 AFF Championship
2016	Taguig	Rugby union	2016 U-19 Asia Rugby Championship
2017	Pasay; Quezon City	Basketball	2017 SEABA Championship
2017	Quezon City	Basketball	2017 SEABA Under-16 Championship
2017	Muntinlupa; Biñan, Laguna	Volleyball	2017 Asian Women's Volleyball Championship
2018	Pasay	Ice hockey	2018 IIHF Challenge Cup of Asia
2018	Manila	Strength athletics	2018 World's Strongest Man
2018	Makati	Trampoline gymnastics	2018 Asian Trampoline Gymnastics Championships
2018	Santa Maria, Bulacan	Basketball	2018 FIBA 3x3 World Cup
2018	Santa Maria, Bulacan	Basketball	2018 FIBA 3x3 World Cup – Women's tournament
2018	Bacolod	Football	2018 AFF Championship
2019	Various	Multi-sport	2019 Southeast Asian Games
2020	Manila	Badminton	2020 Badminton Asia Team Championships
Upcoming
Year	City / Municipality	Sport	Event
2021	Capas	Swimming	2021 Asian Swimming Championships
2023	Pasay; Quezon City; Pasig; Santa Maria, Bulacan	Basketball	2023 FIBA Basketball World Cup

== Annual sport events ==
Year	City / Municipality	Sport	Event
1913 - 2019	Metro Manila	Golf	Philippine Open
1955 -	Luzon	Cycling	Le Tour de Filipinas
1973 - 1976	San Juan	Motorsport	Philippines Grand Prix
1973 - 1978	Manila	Tennis	Philippine International Tennis Tournament
1989 -	Parañaque	Rugby	Manila 10s
2006 - 2009	Manila	Badminton	Philippines Open
2012 - 2014	Manila	Football	Philippine Peace Cup
2013 - 2017	Manila	Golf	Resorts World Manila Masters
2013 - 2014	Manila	Golf	Solaire Open
2014 - 2015	Pasay	Tennis	International Tennis Premier League
2016 - 2016	Manila	Tennis	Manila Challenger

== See also ==
- List of sports venues in the Greater Manila Area
