= List of international sports events in the Philippines =

The Philippines has hosted several major international multi-sport events and world championships.

== International multi-sport competitions ==
Includes international multi-sport events that are held on a regular schedule.

Year	Event	Host City	Nations	Start date	End date
1913	Far Eastern Championship Games	Manila	6	1 February	9 February
1919	Far Eastern Championship Games	Manila	3	12 May	16 May
1925	Far Eastern Championship Games	Manila	4	16 May	20 May
1934	Far Eastern Championship Games	Manila	3	17 May	22 May
1954	Asian Games	Manila	18	1 May	9 May
1981	Southeast Asian Games	Manila	7	5 December	15 December
1991	Southeast Asian Games	Manila	9	24 November	3 December
2002	ASEAN University Games	Manila	9	11 April	30 April
2005	Southeast Asian Games	Manila	11	27 November	5 December
2005	ASEAN Para Games	Manila	11	27 November	5 December
2014	ASEAN School Games	Marikina	7	29 November	7 December
2019	Southeast Asian Games	Various	11	30 November	11 December
2019	ASEAN Para Games	Various	11	Cancelled	
2027	SEA Plus Youth Games	TBD	TBD	TBD	TBD
2028	Asian Beach Games	Cebu	TBD	TBD	TBD
2033	Southeast Asian Games	TBD	11	TBD	TBD

== International sports championships ==
Includes world championships, regional championships and high-profile international events. These events are held throughout the world on a regular schedule.

Year	Event	Host City	Nations	Start date	End date	Sport
1954	Asian Baseball Championship	Manila	4	18 December	26 December	Baseball
1955	Asian Baseball Championship	Manila	4	-	-	Baseball
1957	Asian Table Tennis Championships	Manila	-	-	-	Table Tennis
1960	ABC Championship	Manila	7	16 January	18 January	Basketball
1963	Asian Table Tennis Championships	Manila	-	-	-	Table Tennis
1965	Asian Baseball Championship	Manila	4	-	-	Baseball
1965	Asian Cycling Championships	Manila	-	-	-	Cycling
1966	Asian Judo Championships	Manila	-	28 May	29 May	Judo
1966	AFC Youth Championship	Manila	-	30 April	15 May	Football
1968	Asian Men's Softball Championship	Manila	11	-	-	Softball
1969	Asian Badminton Championships	Manila	-	3 February	15 February	Badminton
1970	Asian Amateur Boxing Championships	Manila	-	-	-	Boxing
1971	Asian Weightlifting Championships	Manila	-	9 October	11 October	Weightlifting
1972	ISF Men's World Championship	Marikina	10	-	-	Softball
1973	Asian Baseball Championship	Manila	5	-	-	Baseball
1973	Asian Athletics Championships	Marikina	14	18 November	23 November	Athletics
1973	ABC Championship	Manila	12	1 December	15 December	Basketball
1974	Asian Men's Softball Championship	Manila	2	-	-	Softball
1977	Asian Cycling Championships	Manila	-	-	-	Cycling
1978	FIBA World Championship	Manila and Quezon City	14	1 October	14 October	Basketball
1983	Asian Cycling Championships	Manila	-	-	-	Cycling
1984	Asian Taekwondo Championships	Manila	-	9 November	11 November	Taekwondo
1989	WEKAF World Championships	Cebu City	-	11 August	13 August	Arnis
1990	Asian Men's Softball Championship	Manila	5	-	-	Softball
1991	Asian Archery Championships	Manila	14	-	-	Archery
1992	Men's Softball World Championship	Manila	18	20 March	28 March	Softball
1993	Asian Athletics Championships	Manila	18	30 November	4 December	Athletics
1994	Asian Taekwondo Championships	Manila	-	28 January	30 January	Taekwondo
1994	WEKAF World Championships	Manila	-	-	-	Arnis
1994	Asian Men's Softball Championship	Manila	7	-	-	Softball
1995	Asian Cycling Championships	Quezon City	-	23 April	3 May	Cycling
1995	Asian Senior Karate Championships	Manila	-	18 September	24 September	Karate
1997	Asian Women's Volleyball Championship	Manila	9	21 September	28 September	Volleyball
1997	Asian Judo Championships	Manila	-	22 November	23 November	Judo
1997	AFC Women's Championship	Bacolod, Barotac Nuevo, and Iloilo City	15	7 November	21 November	Football
1998	WEKAF World Championships	Cebu City	-	-	-	Arnis
1998	Asian Men's Softball Championship	Manila	7	-	-	Softball
2000	WEKAF World Championships	Cebu City	-	-	-	Arnis
2001	Asian Badminton Championships	Manila	-	21 August	26 August	Badminton
2003	Asian Athletics Championships	Manila	18	20 September	23 September	Athletics
2003	Asian Men's Softball Championship	Manila	8	-	-	Softball
2004	Asian Amateur Boxing Championships	Puerto Princesa	-	11 January	18 January	Boxing
2004	Asian Fencing Championships	Manila	-	21 April	26 April	Fencing
2004	WEKAF World Championships	Cebu City	-	-	-	Arnis
2004	Asian Women's Softball Championship	Manila	12	12 December	18 December	Softball
2008	WEKAF World Championships	Cebu City	-	22 July	25 July	Arnis
2009	Asian Men's Volleyball Championship	Manila	18	27 September	5 October	Volleyball
2012	WEKAF World Championships	Cebu City	-	18 July	24 July	Arnis
2013	FIBA Asia Cup	Manila	15	1 August	11 August	Basketball
2016	World University Cycling Championship	Tagaytay	16	17 March	20 March	Cycling
2016	Asian Open Figure Skating Trophy	Manila	-	-	-	Figure Skating
2016	WEKAF World Championships	Mandaue	-	July	July	Arnis
2016	AFF Championship (Group Stage – Group A)	Bocaue and Manila	8	19 November	17 December	Football
2016	Asian Taekwondo Championships	Pasay	-	18 April	20 April	Taekwondo
2016	FIVB Volleyball Women's Club World Championship	Pasay	8	18 October	23 October	Volleyball
2017	Asian Women's Volleyball Championship	Biñan and Muntinlupa	14	9 August	17 August	Volleyball
2018	Asian Trampoline Gymnastics Championships	Makati	10	19 May	20 May	Gymnastics
2018	FIBA 3x3 World Cup	Bocaue	36	8 June	12 June	3x3 basketball
2019	MLBB Southeast Asia Cup	Quezon City	9	19 June	23 June	Esports
2021	Asian Women's Volleyball Championships	Angeles City, Olongapo, and San Fernando	8	15 May	22 May	Volleyball
2022	AFF Women's Championship	Manila, Biñan, and Imus	11	4 July	17 July	Football
2022	FIVB Women's Volleyball Nations League Week 2	Pasay	8	14 June	19 June	Volleyball
2022	FIVB Men's Volleyball Nations League Week 2	Quezon City	8	21 June	26 June	Volleyball
2022	WEKAF World Championships	Mandaue	-	17 July	21 July	Arnis
2023	Asian Rhythmic Gymnastics Championships	Manila	20	31 May	3 June	Gymnastics
2023	FIVB Men's Volleyball Nations League Week 3	Pasay	8	4 July	9 July	Volleyball
2023	FIBA Basketball World Cup	Bocaue, Pasay and Quezon City	32	25 August	10 September	Basketball
2024	Asian Swimming Championships	Capas	45	26 February	9 March	Aquatics
2024	Volleyball World Beach Pro Tour Nuvali Futures	Santa Rosa	11	11 April	14 April	Beach volleyball
2024	FIVB Men's Volleyball Nations League Week 3	Pasay	8	18 June	21 June	Volleyball
2024	Asian Beach Volleyball Championships	Santa Rosa	-	5 November	10 November	Beach Volleyball
2024	ASEAN Women’s Futsal Championship	Pasig	5	16 November	21 November	Futsal
2024	Volleyball World Beach Pro Tour Nuvali Challenge	Santa Rosa	27	29 November	1 December	Beach volleyball
2025	Volleyball World Beach Pro Tour Nuvali Futures	Santa Rosa	14	2 May	4 May	Beach volleyball
2025	FIVB Volleyball Men's World Championship	Pasay and Quezon City	32	12 September	28 September	Volleyball
2025	Volleyball World Beach Pro Tour Nuvali Challenge	Santa Rosa	28	15 October	19 October	Beach volleyball
2025	Junior World Artistic Gymnastics Championships	Manila	77	20 November	24 November	Gymnastics
2025	FIFA Futsal Women's World Cup	Pasig	16	21 November	7 December	Futsal
2026	Philippine Women's Open	Manila	15	26 January	31 January	Tennis
2026	2026 Asian Track Cycling Championships	Tagaytay City	16	26 March	31 March	Track Cycling
2026	FIVB Women's Volleyball Nations League (Week 2)	Pasig City	6	17 June	21 June	Volleyball
2027	FIVB Women's Volleyball Nations League (Week TBD)	Cebu City	TBD	TBD	TBD	Volleyball
2027	FIBA Women's Asia Cup	TBD	16	TBD	TBD	Basketball
2027	World Wushu Championships	TBD	TBD	TBD	TBD	Wushu
2028	Asian Wushu Championships	TBD	TBD	TBD	TBD	Wushu
2029	FIVB Volleyball Women's World Cup	TBD	32	TBD	TBD	Volleyball

== Annual international sporting events ==
International events that are held in the Philippines annually. These events include both Filipino and overseas athletes and teams.

Sport	Month Held	Event	City
Cycling	January–March	Ronda Pilipinas	Various cities
Cycling	April	Tour de Filipinas	Various cities

== See also ==
- Sport in the Philippines
- List of multi-sport events
