= Softball at the SEA Games =

- Current season, competition or edition: Softball at the 2025 SEA Games
- Sport: Softball
- Founded: 1979
- No. of teams: 4 (M) - 5 (W) (in 2025)
- Continent: Asia
- Most recent champions: M: Philippines; W: Philippines (2025)
- Most titles: M: Philippines (9 titles); W: Philippines (11 titles)

Softball has been occasionally held at the SEA Games for both men and women.

== History ==
Softball debuted at the SEA Games in the 1979 edition.

The Philippines has dominated both the men's and women's tournament. Editions on which the Philippines did not win the men's title was in 1997 (Indonesia) and 2019 (Singapore). The Philippines won all women's title.

== Results ==
=== Men's ===
Year	Hosts	Gold Medal Game			Bronze Medal Game		
Year	Hosts	Gold	Score	Silver	Bronze	Score	Fourth Place
1977	Malaysia	Softball tournament not held					
1979	Indonesia	Philippines	No information	Singapore	No information		
1981	Philippines	Philippines	No information	Indonesia	Singapore	No information	
1983	Singapore	Softball tournament not held					
1985	Thailand	Softball tournament not held					
1987	Indonesia	Philippines	1–0	Indonesia	No information		
1989	Malaysia	Softball tournament not held					
1991	Philippines	Philippines	4–3	Indonesia	No information		
1993	Singapore	Softball tournament not held					
1995	Thailand	Softball tournament not held					
1997	Indonesia	Indonesia	3–0	Philippines	Malaysia		Singapore
1999	Brunei	Softball tournament not held					
2001	Malaysia	Softball tournament not held					
2003	Vietnam	Softball tournament not held					
2005	Philippines	Philippines	4–3	Indonesia	Malaysia	No playoff	No other team
2007	Thailand	Philippines	11–2	Indonesia	Malaysia	Page playoff	Thailand
2009	Laos	Softball tournament not held					
2011	Indonesia	Philippines	7–3	Indonesia	Singapore	Page playoff	Malaysia
2013	Myanmar	Softball tournament not held					
2015	Singapore	Philippines	6–4	Indonesia	Singapore	Page playoff	Malaysia
2017	Malaysia	Softball tournament not held					
2019	Philippines	Singapore	6–1	Philippines	Indonesia	5–0	Thailand
2021	Vietnam	Softball tournament not held					
2023	Cambodia	Softball tournament not held					
2025	Thailand	Philippines	3–0	Singapore	Thailand	9–2	Malaysia

=== Women's ===
Year	Hosts	Gold Medal Game			Bronze Medal Game		
Year	Hosts	Gold	Score	Silver	Bronze	Score	Fourth Place
1977	Malaysia	Softball tournament not held					
1979	Indonesia	Philippines	No information		No information		
1981	Philippines	Philippines	No information		Singapore	No information	
1983	Singapore	Softball tournament not held					
1985	Thailand	Softball tournament not held					
1987	Indonesia	Philippines	3–0	Indonesia	Singapore	No information	
1989	Malaysia	Softball tournament not held					
1991	Philippines	Philippines	1–0	Indonesia	No information		
1993	Singapore	Softball tournament not held					
1995	Thailand	Softball tournament not held					
1997	Indonesia	Philippines	4–3	Indonesia	No information		
1999	Brunei	Softball tournament not held					
2001	Malaysia	Softball tournament not held					
2003	Vietnam	Softball tournament not held					
2005	Philippines	Philippines	1–0	Indonesia	Thailand	No playoff	Singapore
2007	Thailand	Philippines	7–0	Singapore	Thailand	Page playoff	Indonesia
2009	Laos	Softball tournament not held					
2011	Indonesia	Philippines	6–0	Thailand	Indonesia	Page playoff	Singapore
2013	Myanmar	Softball tournament not held					
2015	Singapore	Philippines	3–0	Thailand	Singapore	Page playoff	Indonesia
2017	Malaysia	Softball tournament not held					
2019	Philippines	Philippines	8–0	Indonesia	Malaysia	Page playoff	Singapore
2021	Vietnam	Softball tournament not held					
2023	Cambodia	Softball tournament not held					
2025	Thailand	Philippines	4-1	Singapore	Thailand	1–0	Indonesia

== Medal tally ==
=== Overall ===
Medal tally since the 2005 SEA Games

Rank	Nation	Gold	Silver	Bronze	Total
1	Philippines (PHI)	20	2	0	22
2	Indonesia (INA)	1	12	2	15
3	Singapore (SGP)	1	4	6	11
4	Thailand (THA)	0	2	4	6
5	Malaysia (MAS)	0	0	4	4
Totals (5 entries)		22	20	16	58

=== Men's tournament ===
Medal tally since the 2005 SEA Games

Rank	Nation	Gold	Silver	Bronze	Total
1	Philippines	9	2	0	11
2	Indonesia	1	7	1	9
3	Singapore	1	2	3	6
4	Malaysia	0	0	3	3
5	Thailand	0	0	1	1
Totals (5 entries)		11	11	8	30

=== Women's tournament ===
Medal tally since the 2005 SEA Games

Rank	Nation	Gold	Silver	Bronze	Total
1	Philippines	11	0	0	11
2	Indonesia	0	5	1	6
3	Singapore	0	2	3	5
3	Thailand	0	2	3	5
5	Malaysia	0	0	1	1
Totals (5 entries)		11	9	8	28
