= Softball at the 2019 SEA Games – Men's tournament =

Tournament details
- Host country: Philippines
- Dates: 2–8 December
- Teams: 4
- Defending champions: Philippines (2015)

Final positions
- Champions: Singapore
- Runner-up: Philippines
- Third place: Indonesia
- Fourth place: Thailand

The 2019 Southeast Asian Games men's softball tournament was held at the Clark International Sports Complex at The Villages, in Pampanga from 2 to 8 December 2019.

== Results ==
=== Preliminary round ===
Teams	W	L	Pct.	GB
Philippines (H)	3	0	1.000	–
Singapore	2	1	.667	1
Indonesia	1	2	.333	2
Thailand	0	3	.000	3

December 2, 2019; 9:30	Philippines	11–0	Thailand
December 2, 2019; 9:30		Boxscore

December 2, 2019; 12:30	Indonesia	2–10	Singapore	{{{stadium}}}
December 2, 2019; 12:30		Boxscore		{{{stadium}}}

December 3, 2019; 10:00	Indonesia	3–7	Philippines	{{{stadium}}}
December 3, 2019; 10:00		Boxscore		{{{stadium}}}

December 5, 2019; 9:00	Singapore	13–0	Thailand	{{{stadium}}}
December 5, 2019; 9:00		Boxscore		{{{stadium}}}

December 4, 2019; 10:00	Singapore	0–8	Philippines	{{{stadium}}}
December 4, 2019; 10:00		Boxscore		{{{stadium}}}

December 4, 2019; 14:00	Indonesia	7–0	Thailand	{{{stadium}}}
December 4, 2019; 14:00		Boxscore		{{{stadium}}}

=== Final round ===
==== Page play-offs ====
===== Page 1–2 =====
December 6, 2019; 10:00	Philippines	3–4	Singapore	{{{stadium}}}
December 6, 2019; 10:00		Boxscore		{{{stadium}}}

===== Page 3–4 =====
December 6, 2019; 14:30	Indonesia	5–0	Thailand	{{{stadium}}}
December 6, 2019; 14:30		Boxscore		{{{stadium}}}

==== Semi-final ====
December 7, 2019; 10:00	Philippines	9–0	Indonesia	{{{stadium}}}
December 7, 2019; 10:00		Boxscore		{{{stadium}}}

==== Final ====
December 8, 2019; 10:00	Singapore	6–1	Philippines	{{{stadium}}}
December 8, 2019; 10:00		Boxscore		{{{stadium}}}

== See also ==
- Women's tournament
