= 2018 Asian Men's Softball Championship =

Tournament details
- Host country: Indonesia
- Dates: 23-28 April 2018
- Teams: 9
- Defending champions: Japan

Final positions
- Champions: Japan (8th title)
- Runner-up: Philippines
- Third place: Singapore

The 2018 Asian Men's Softball Championship was an international softball tournament which featured nine nations which was held in April 2018. The games were held at the Gelora Bung Karno Softball Stadium. The top three teams qualified for the 2019 ISF Men's World Championship to be held in Prague, Czech Republic. The competition also served as a test-event for the 2018 Asian Games

Japan became champions of the tournament winning their seventh consecutive title. The Philippines finished second while Singapore finished third.

== Participants ==
- Chinese Taipei
- Hong Kong
- India
- Indonesia
- Japan
- Malaysia
- Philippines
- Singapore
- Thailand
