= 2006 Asian Men's Softball Championship =

Tournament details
- Host country: Japan
- Dates: 2–5 November 2006
- Teams: 8
- Defending champions: Japan

Final positions
- Champions: Japan (5th title)
- Runner-up: Philippines
- Third place: Indonesia
- Fourth place: Hong Kong

The 2006 Asian Men's Softball Championship was an international softball tournament which featured eight nations which was held from 2–5 November 2006 in Kitakyushu, Japan.

== Participants ==
- Brunei
- Hong Kong
- Indonesia
- Malaysia
- Japan
- Philippines
- Singapore
- Thailand
