= 1985 Asian Men's Softball Championship =

Tournament details
- Host country: Japan
- Dates: 1985
- Teams: 9
- Defending champions: Philippines

Final positions
- Champions: Japan (1st title)
- Runner-up: Chinese Taipei
- Third place: Philippines
- Fourth place: Indonesia

The 1985 Asian Men's Softball Championship was an international softball tournament which featured nine nations which was held in Shizuoka, Japan.

== Participants ==
- Hong Kong
- Japan
- Indonesia
- India
- Malaysia
- Philippines
- Singapore
- Thailand
- Chinese Taipei
