= 1992 Men's Softball World Championship =

8th Men's Softball World Championship held in Philippines

Tournament details
- Host country: Philippines
- Dates: March 20 – 28
- Teams: 18
- Venues: 2 (in 2 host cities)
- Defending champions: United States (1988)

Final positions
- Champions: Canada
- Runner-up: New Zealand
- Third place: United States
- Fourth place: Japan

The 1992 ISF Men's World Championship was an international softball tournament. The tournament was held in Manila and Pasig, Philippines from 20 to 28 March 1992. It was the 8th time the World Championship took place. Eighteen nations competed, including defending champions United States.

In the grand final held at the Rosario Sports Complex on March 28 and attended by 13,000 people, Canada won over runner-up New Zealand.

== Bidding ==
New Zealand, the Philippines and the United States made bids to host the games. The town of Midland, Michigan, previous 1984 hosts, was the candidate town of the United States for the 1992 bid. The Philippines' bidding delegation was led by then Pasig Mayor, Mario Raymundo. The Philippines previously hosted the championships in Marikina in 1972. At an International Softball Federation convention in Vancouver, British Columbia, Canada in 1989, The Philippines were awarded hosting rights for the tournament.

== Venues ==
The Rosario Sports Complex in Pasig and the Rizal Memorial Ball Park in Manila.

== Pools composition ==
Pool A
Argentina	Botswana	Japan	Netherlands	Northern Mariana Islands	Papua New Guinea	Hong Kong	Philippines	United States
Pool B
Australia	Canada	Chinese Taipei	Czechoslovakia	Indonesia	Guam	Mexico	New Zealand	Singapore
References: Manila Standard

== Preliminary round ==
=== Pool A ===
Rk	Team	W	L	PCT	RS	RA	GBL
1	United States	8	0	-	-	-	-
2	Japan	7	1	-	-	-	-
3	Argentina	6	2	-	-	-	-
4	Philippines	5	3	-	-	-	-
5	Netherlands	4	4	-	-	-	-
6	Botswana	3	5	-	-	-	-
7	Northern Mariana Islands	1	7	-	-	-	-
8	Hong Kong	1	7	-	-	-	-
9	Papua New Guinea	1	7	-	-	-	-

=== Pool B ===
Rk	Team	W	L	PCT	RS	RA	GBL
1	Canada	8	0	-	-	-	-
2	New Zealand	7	1	-	-	-	-
3	Australia	6	2	-	-	-	-
4	Mexico	5	3	-	-	-	-
5	Chinese Taipei	4	4	-	-	-	-
6	Indonesia	3	5	-	-	-	-
7	Guam	1	7	-	-	-	-
8	Czechoslovakia	1	7	-	-	-	-
9	Singapore	1	7	-	-	-	-

== Final round ==
Semifinal; March 27
Japan	0
New Zealand	1
Canada	7
United States	2

Final; March 27
United States	2
New Zealand	0

Grand final March 28
Canada	5
New Zealand	3

=== Semifinals ===
March 27 at Rosario Sports Complex, Pasig
Team	1	2	3	4	5	6	7	8	R	H	E
Japan	0	0	0	0	0	0	0	-	0	1	0
New Zealand	0	1	0	0	0	0	0	X	1	2	2
Boxscore

March 27 at Rosario Sports Complex, Pasig
Team	1	2	3	4	5	6	7	R	H	E
Canada	0	1	4	0	1	0	1	7	5	1
United States	0	0	1	0	0	1	0	2	4	4
Boxscore

=== Final ===
March 28 14:00 at Rosario Sports Complex, Pasig
Team	1	2	3	4	5	6	7	8	R	H	E
United States	0	0	0	0	0	0	0	-	1	5	2
New Zealand	0	0	3	0	0	0	0	X	4	7	0
Boxscore

=== Grand Final ===
March 28 16:00 at Rosario Sports Complex, Pasig
Team	1	2	3	4	5	6	7	8	R	H	E
Canada	0	0	0	0	3	0	0	2	5	1	1
New Zealand	0	0	2	1	0	0	0	0	3	4	1
Attendance: 13,000; Boxscore

== Final standings ==
Rk	Team	W	L
1st place, gold medalist(s)	Canada	11	1
2nd place, silver medalist(s)	New Zealand	11	4
3rd place, bronze medalist(s)	United States	10	3
4	Japan	7	2
Failed to qualify for Playoffs
5	Australia	6	2
6	Argentina	6	2
7	Philippines	5	3
8	Mexico	5	3
9	Chinese Taipei	4	4
–	Netherlands*	4	4
10	Botswana	3	5
11	Indonesia	3	5
12	Czechoslovakia	1	7
13	Northern Mariana Islands	1	7
14	Hong Kong	1	7
15	Singapore	1	7
16	Guam	1	7
17	Papua New Guinea	0	6

(*) Note: The Netherlands is not included at the final standing table by the ISF despite the team playing at least a match at the tournament. No sources has been retrieved for the reason for the Netherlands' omission at the ISF table. The Netherlands' standing after the elimination round was retrieved from Manila Standard.
