= 2012 Asian Men's Softball Championship =

Tournament details
- Host country: Japan
- Dates: 25–28 October 2012
- Teams: 6
- Defending champions: Japan

Final positions
- Champions: Japan (6th title)
- Runner-up: Philippines
- Third place: Indonesia
- Fourth place: Hong Kong

The 2012 Asian Men's Softball Championship was an international softball tournament which featured six nations which was held from 25–28 October 2012 in Niimi, Japan.

== Participants ==
- Hong Kong
- Indonesia
- India
- Japan
- Philippines
- Singapore
