= 2004 Men's Softball World Championship =

International softball tournament

Tournament details
- Host country: New Zealand
- Teams: 15
- Defending champions: New Zealand

Final positions
- Champions: New Zealand
- Runner-up: Canada
- Third place: Australia
- Fourth place: United States

The 2004 ISF Men's World Championship was an international softball tournament. The final was held in Christchurch, New Zealand on 2 September 2004. It was the 11th time the World Championship took place. Fifteen nations competed, including defending champions New Zealand.

In the end, New Zealand won their third consecutive World Cup, over a win against runner-up Canada.

== First round ==
=== Group A ===
Place	Nation	P	W	D	L	Pts
1	Canada	7	6	0	1	12
2	New Zealand	7	6	0	1	12
3	Australia	7	5	0	2	10
4	Samoa	7	4	0	3	8
5	South Africa	7	2	0	5	4
6	Venezuela	7	2	0	5	4
7	Philippines	7	2	0	5	4
8	Netherlands	7	1	0	6	2

=== Group B ===
Place	Nation	P	W	D	L	Pts
1	United States	6	6	0	0	12
2	Japan	6	5	0	1	10
3	Czech Republic	6	4	0	2	8
4	Argentina	6	3	0	3	6
5	Great Britain	6	2	0	4	4
6	Botswana	6	1	0	5	2
7	Hong Kong	6	0	0	6	0

== Play Offs ==
Nation	Nation	Score
Australia	Argentina	7-0
Samoa	Czech Republic	5-0
Canada	Japan	5-0
New Zealand	United States	9-0
Australia	Japan	5-0
United States	Samoa	3-2
New Zealand	Canada	13-5
Australia	United States	5-4
Canada	Australia	7-0

== Final ==
Nation	Nation	Score
New Zealand	Canada	9-5

== Final standings ==
Rk	Team	W	L
1	New Zealand	9	1
2	Canada	8	3
3	Australia	8	3
4	United States	7	2
5	Japan	5	3
6	Samoa	5	4
7	Czech Republic	4	3
8	Argentina	3	4
Failed to qualify for Playoffs
9	Great Britain	2	4
10	Philippines	2	5
11	Venezuela	2	5
12	South Africa	2	5
13	Botswana	1	5
14	Netherlands	1	6
15	Hong Kong	0	6
