= 2023 Men's Softball Asia Cup =

2023 softball championship

Tournament details
- Host country: Japan
- Dates: June 2023
- Teams: 6
- Defending champions: Japan

Final positions
- Champions: Japan
- Runner-up: Singapore
- Third place: Philippines
- Fourth place: Hong Kong

The 2023 Asian Men's Softball Championship will be an international softball tournament in Kochi, Japan. It will feature six nations and will be held from 25 to 28 June 2023. The tournament serves as a qualifier to determine the three Asian teams for the 2025 Men's Softball World Cup.

== Participants ==
- Chinese Taipei
- Hong Kong
- India
- Japan
- Philippines
- Singapore

== Preliminary round ==
Pos	Team	Pld	W	L	RF	RA	RD	PCT	GB	Qualification
1	Japan (H)	5	5	0	42	0	+42	1.000	—	Advance to Final
2	Singapore	5	4	1	32	10	+22	.800	1	Advance to Final
3	Philippines	5	3	2	25	17	+8	.600	2	Advance to Bronze medal game
4	Hong Kong	5	2	3	17	30	−13	.400	3	Advance to Bronze medal game
5	Chinese Taipei	5	1	4	10	32	−22	.200	4	
6	India	5	0	5	5	42	−37	.000	5	

Source: WBSC
(H) Hosts

=== Matches ===
Date	Road	Score	Home
25 June	Hong Kong	0–9	Singapore
25 June	Philippines	5–1	India
25 June	Japan	12–0	India
25 June	Philippines	7–1	Chinese Taipei
25 June	Singapore	0–2	Japan
25 June	Hong Kong	7–0	Chinese Taipei
26 June	Chinese Taipei	2–6	Singapore
26 June	India	3–10	Hong Kong
26 June	Hong Kong	0–10	Japan
26 June	Philippines	5–9	Singapore
26 June	Japan	6–0	Philippines
26 June	India	0–7	Chinese Taipei
27 June	Philippines	8–0	Hong Kong
27 June	Japan	12–0	Chinese Taipei
27 June	India	1–8	Singapore

== Final Round ==
=== Third place play-off ===
28 June 2023 9:00 (JST) Haruno Softball Stadium
Team	1	2	3	4	5	R	H	E
Hong Kong	0	0	0	0	0	0	1	0
Philippines	0	0	6	0	1	7	10	0
Boxscore

=== Final ===
28 June 2023 13:00 (JST) Haruno Softball Stadium
Team	1	2	3	4	5	6	7	R	H	E
Singapore	0	0	0	0	0	0	0	0	2	1
Japan	0	4	0	0	0	0	0	4	6	0
Boxscore
