= 1972 ISF Men's World Championship =

Tournament details
- Host country: Philippines
- Teams: 10
- Defending champions: United States

Final positions
- Champions: Canada
- Runner-up: United States
- Third place: New Zealand
- Fourth place: Mexico

The 1972 ISF Men's World Championship was an international softball tournament. The tournament was held at the Rodriguez Sports Center in Marikina, Rizal, Philippines. It was the 3rd time the World Championship took place and the first time the Philippines to host the tournament. Ten nations competed, including defending champions United States.

== Final standings ==
| Rk | Team | W | L |
|---|---|---|---|
| 1st place, gold medalist(s) | Canada | 12 | 1 |
| 2nd place, silver medalist(s) | United States | 11 | 4 |
| 3rd place, bronze medalist(s) | New Zealand | 7 | 6 |
| 4 | Mexico | 6 | 5 |
Failed to qualify for Playoffs
| 5 | Philippines | 5 | 4 |
| 6 | Japan | 5 | 4 |
| 7 | Guam | 3 | 6 |
| 8 | Taiwan | 2 | 7 |
| 9 | Singapore | 2 | 7 |
| 10 | Hong Kong | 0 | 9 |
