= 2009 Men's Softball World Championship =

Tournament details
- Host country: Canada
- Teams: 16
- Defending champions: New Zealand

Final positions
- Champions: Australia
- Runner-up: New Zealand
- Third place: Canada
- Fourth place: United States

The 2009 ISF Men's World Championship was an international softball tournament. The final was held in Saskatoon, Canada on 26 July 2009. It was the 12th time the World Championship took place. Sixteen nations competed, including defending champions New Zealand.

In the end, Australia won over runner-up New Zealand.

== First round ==
=== Group A ===
Place	Nation	P	W	D	L	Pts
1	New Zealand	7	7	0	0	14
2	United States	7	6	0	1	12
3	Japan	7	4	0	3	8
4	Great Britain	7	3	0	4	6
5	Philippines	7	3	0	4	6
6	Denmark	7	3	0	4	6
7	Mexico	7	1	0	6	2
8	Botswana	7	1	0	6	2

=== Group B ===
Place	Nation	P	W	D	L	Pts
1	Canada	7	7	0	0	14
2	Australia	7	6	0	1	12
3	Venezuela	7	5	0	2	10
4	Argentina	7	4	0	3	8
5	Czech Republic	7	3	0	4	6
6	Puerto Rico	7	2	0	5	4
7	South Africa	7	1	0	6	2
8	Indonesia	7	0	0	7	0

== Play-offs ==
Nation	Nation	Score
Japan	Argentina	7-6
Venezuela	Great Britain	10-3
Australia	New Zealand	7-0
Canada	United States	6-4
New Zealand	Japan	10-6
United States	Venezuela	8-1
Australia	Canada	2-0
New Zealand	United States	7-3
New Zealand	Canada	8-5

== Final ==
Nation	Nation	Score
Australia	New Zealand	5-0

== Final standings ==
Rk	Team	W	L
1	Australia	9	1
2	New Zealand	9	2
3	Canada	8	2
4	United States	7	3
5	Venezuela	5	4
6	Japan	5	4
7	Argentina	4	4
8	Great Britain	3	5
Failed to qualify for Playoffs
9	Czech Republic	3	4
10	Philippines	3	4
11	Denmark	3	4
12	Puerto Rico	2	5
13	Botswana	1	6
14	Mexico	1	6
15	South Africa	1	6
16	Indonesia	0	7
