= 2003 Asian Men's Softball Championship =

Tournament details
- Host country: Philippines
- Dates: 29 November – 3 December 2003
- Teams: 8
- Defending champions: Japan

Final positions
- Champions: Japan (4th title)
- Runner-up: Philippines
- Third place: Chinese Taipei
- Fourth place: Hong Kong

The 2003 Asian Men's Softball Championship was an international softball tournament which featured eight nations which was held at the Rizal Memorial Baseball Stadium in Manila, Philippines.

== Participants ==
- Hong Kong
- Indonesia
- India
- Iran
- Japan
- Philippines
- Thailand
- Chinese Taipei

== Preliminary round ==
=== Group A ===
- Hong Kong
- Japan
- Indonesia
- Thailand

=== Group B ===
- Philippines
- Chinese Taipei
- India
- Iran

== Final Round ==
Semifinals
A1	Japan	9
B1	Philippines	2
A2	Hong Kong	L
B2	Chinese Taipei	W

Bronze medal game
Philippines	W
Chinese Taipei	L

Gold medal game
Japan	3
Philippines	0

=== Final ===
3 December 2003 15:00 (UTC+8) Rizal Memorial Baseball Stadium
Team	1	2	3	4	5	6	7	R	H	E
Philippines	0	0	0	0	0	0	0	0	2	2
Japan	2	0	1	0	0	0	0	3	4	1
Attendance: 2,000; Boxscore
