= Rosario Sports Complex =

Sports facility in Pasig, Philippines

- Interactive map of Rosario Sports Complex
- Location: Pasig, Philippines
- Coordinates: 14°35′20″N 121°05′15″E
- Owner: Philippine Sports Commission
- Operator: Philippine Sports Commission

Construction
- Opened: 1990
- Renovated: 1997
- Demolished: 2010s

Tenant
- Philippines men's national softball team

The Rosario Sports Complex (RSC) was a ballpark in Pasig, Metro Manila, Philippines constructed in 1990.

== History ==
The Metro Manila Authority provided ₱7 million to the Pasig city government under former Pasig Mayor Mario Raymundo to construct the facility in a 9 hectare lot.

The sports complex is used for softball. The first international tournament hosted by the RSC is 1990 Asian Men's Softball Championship. The first exhibition game at the RSC was held on March 17, 1992 between the men's national softball teams of Chinese Taipei and the Philippines with the latter defeating the former 2–0. The sports venue also hosted some matches of the 1992 ISF Men's World Championship

After Mayor Raymundo lost to Vicente Eusebio at the 1992 elections, he was criticized for approving Municipal Resolution no. 12-92 authorizing the Philippine Sports Commission (PSC) to take over the sports complex despite pending claims of the owners of the sporting venue, before he stepped down from office. The PSC was tasked to operate and manage the complex. Raymundo cited the high cost of maintenance of the complex as the reason for the move. This was criticized by newly elected Councilor Sonny Rivera, who viewed the move as an insult to the newly elected officials of Pasig.

The conditions of the sports complex deteriorated after Raymundo's term as Pasig mayor ended. His successor, Vicente Eusebio renovated the RSC in 1997 for a local youth baseball tournament, the inaugural Mayor Vicente Eusebio Baseball Cup.

The RSC is known to have hosted the 2005 SEA Games softball event and the 2014 Little League Philippine Series.

== Replacement ==
A new Rosario Sports Complex was built over the site of the ballpark. However construction has been on hold for six years as of 2025.
