= 1994 Asian Men's Softball Championship =

Tournament details
- Host country: Philippines
- Dates: February – 5 March 1994
- Teams: 7
- Defending champions: Philippines

Final positions
- Champions: Japan (2nd title)
- Runner-up: Philippines
- Third place: Chinese Taipei
- Fourth place: Hong Kong

The 1994 Asian Men's Softball Championship was an international softball tournament which featured seven nations which was held at the Rizal Memorial Baseball Stadium in Manila, Philippines from late February to 5 March 1994.

== Participants ==
- Hong Kong
- Japan
- Malaysia
- Philippines
- Singapore
- Thailand
- Chinese Taipei

== Final Round ==
Semifinals
Japan	2
Philippines	1
Hong Kong	0
Chinese Taipei	7

Bronze medal game
Philippines	3
Chinese Taipei	0

Gold medal game
Japan	4
Philippines	0
