= 2015 Men's Softball World Championship =

Championnat du monde de softball masculin 2015 dela WBSC

Tournament details
- Host country: Canada
- Dates: 26 June-5 July 2015
- Teams: 15
- Defending champions: New Zealand

Final positions
- Champions: Canada (4th title)
- Runner-up: New Zealand
- Third place: Venezuela
- Fourth place: Australia

The 2015 ISF Men's World Championship was an international softball tournament held in Saskatoon, Canada from 26 June-5 July 2015. It was the 14th time the World Championship took place and the third time Saskatoon hosted the tournament.

== Participating teams and officials ==
=== Qualification ===
Event	Date	Location	Berths	Qualified
Host nation			1	Canada
ISF 2015 Men's World Championship – Africa Qualifier; The two berths were split between Europe and Pan America	Not Held	N/A	2	Guatemala; Great Britain
2014 Pan American Men's Softball Championship	24 October-1 November 2014	(Argentina) Paraná	6	Venezuela; Argentina; United States; Dominican Republic; Mexico
2014 Asian Men's Softball Championship	16–20 December 2014	Singapore	3	Japan; Philippines; ~~Indonesia~~
2014 ESF Men's Championship	14-19 July 2014	(Czech Republic) Havlíčkův Brod	3	Czech Republic; Denmark; Netherlands
ISF 2015 Men's World Championship – Oceania Qualifier	12–13 December 2014	(New Zealand) Auckland	2	New Zealand; Australia
TOTAL			16	

=== Pools composition ===
Pool A
Argentina	Canada	Czech Republic	Great Britain	Guatemala	~~Indonesia~~	New Zealand	Philippines
Pool B
Australia	Denmark	Dominican Republic	Japan	Mexico	Netherlands	United States	Venezuela

Indonesia withdrew from the tournament on June 19 and was not replaced.

=== Officials ===
The ISF appointed 16 umpires from 11 national countries to facilitate matches of the tournament. Bob Stanton from Canada is named Umpire in Chief, and Wayne Saunders and Jeff Whippl, from New Zealand and Canada respectively, were named assistant Umpire in Chiefs.

- Darren Sibraa (Australia)
- Jens Jacobsen (Denmark)
- Serge Laflamme (Canada)
- Terry Ritcher (Canada)
- George Finley (Canada)
- Pavel Východský (Czech Republic)
- Galip Sonmez (Germany)
- Kenji Nakashima (Japan)
- Renzo Ruiz (Mexico)
- Lance Brown (New Zealand)
- Mark Porteous (New Zealand)
- Jose Rodriguez (Nicaragua)
- Jon Hand (United States)
- Keith Cook (United States)
- Frederick Ewald III (United States)
- Rafael Garcia (Venezuela)

== Preliminary round ==
=== Pool A ===
Rk	Team	W	L	PCT	RS	RA	RDIFF
1	Canada	7	0	1.000	55	9	46
2	Argentina	5	2	.714	33	13	20
3	Czech Republic	5	2	.714	36	35	1
4	New Zealand	5	2	.714	48	10	38
5	Great Britain	3	4	.429	25	28	-3
6	Guatemala	2	5	.286	17	32	-15
7	Philippines	1	6	.184	16	54	-38
N/A	Indonesia	0	7	.000	0	49	-49

Date	Local time	Road team	Score	Home team	Inn.	Venue	Game duration	Attendance	Boxscore
Jun 26, 2015	12:00	Czech Republic	12-5	Philippines	6	Gordon Howe Softball Park	2:27		Boxscore
Jun 26, 2015	14:30	Great Britain	Cancelled (7-0)	Indonesia		Gordon Howe Softball Park			Boxscore
Jun 26, 2015	18:30	Guatemala	0-6	Canada	7	Bob Van Impe Stadium	2:22		Boxscore
Jun 26, 2015	21:00	New Zealand	2-3	Argentina	7	Bob Van Impe Stadium	2:59		Boxscore
Jun 27, 2015	10:00	Philippines	Cancelled (7-0)	Indonesia		Bob Van Impe Stadium			Boxscore
Jun 27, 2015	15:00	Argentina	7-0	Guatemala	5	Bob Van Impe Stadium	1:38		Boxscore
Jun 27, 2015	18:00	Canada	10-2	Czech Republic	5	Bob Van Impe Stadium	1:31		Boxscore
Jun 27, 2015	20:30	Great Britain	1-9	New Zealand	6	Bob Van Impe Stadium	1:51		Boxscore
Jun 28, 2015	10:30	Guatemala	4-0	Philippines	7	Gordon Howe Softball Park	2:16		Boxscore
Jun 28, 2015	13:00	Czech Republic	4-2	Great Britain	7	Gordon Howe Softball Park	2:00		Boxscore
Jun 28, 2015	15:00	Canada	2-1	New Zealand	7	Bob Van Impe Stadium	2:34		Boxscore
Jun 28, 2015	15:30	Argentina	Cancelled (7-0)	Indonesia		Gordon Howe Softball Park			Boxscore
Jun 29, 2015	10:00	Czech Republic	4-2	Argentina	7	Bob Van Impe Stadium	1:55		Boxscore
Jun 29, 2015	12:30	Great Britain	4-0	Guatemala	7	Bob Van Impe Stadium	2:04		Boxscore
Jun 29, 2015	10:30	New Zealand	9-2	Philippines	5	Gordon Howe Softball Park	1:47		Boxscore
Jun 29, 2015	18:00	Canada	Cancelled (7-0)	Indonesia		Bob Van Impe Stadium			Boxscore
Jun 30, 2015	12:30	Philippines	2-10	Great Britain	5	Bob Van Impe Stadium	1:43		Boxscore
Jun 30, 2015	13:00	Czech Republic	6-5	Guatemala	7	Gordon Howe Softball Park	2:46		Boxscore
Jun 30, 2015	15:30	New Zealand	Cancelled (7-0)	Indonesia		Gordon Howe Softball Park			Boxscore
Jun 30, 2015	18:00	Argentina	5-7	Canada	7	Bob Van Impe Stadium	2:37		Boxscore
Jul 1, 2015	10:00	New Zealand	9-1	Guatemala	6	Bob Van Impe Stadium	2:01		Boxscore
Jul 1, 2015	10:30	Czech Republic	Cancelled (7-0)	Indonesia		Gordon Howe Softball Park			Boxscore
Jul 1, 2015	15:00	Great Britain	1-11	Canada	4	Bob Van Impe Stadium	1:42		Boxscore
Jul 1, 2015	15:30	Argentina	7-0	Philippines	5	Gordon Howe Softball Park	1:27		Boxscore
Jul 2, 2015	10:00	Great Britain	0-2	Argentina	7	Bob Van Impe Stadium	2:02		Boxscore
Jul 2, 2015	12:30	New Zealand	11-1	Czech Republic	5	Bob Van Impe Stadium	1:38		Boxscore
Jul 2, 2015	15:00	Guatemala	Cancelled (7-0)	Indonesia		Bob Van Impe Stadium			Boxscore
Jul 2, 2015	18:00	Canada	12-0	Philippines	4	Bob Van Impe Stadium	1:13		Boxscore

=== Pool B ===
Rk	Team	W	L	PCT	RS	RA	RDIFF
1	Dominican Republic	6	1	.857	37	17	20
1	Australia	5	2	.714	36	18	18
3	Venezuela	5	2	.714	29	17	12
4	Japan	4	3	.571	31	19	12
5	United States	4	3	.571	32	23	9
6	Mexico	3	4	.429	36	33	3
7	Denmark	1	6	.143	15	41	-26
8	Netherlands	0	7	.000	2	37	-35

Date	Local time	Road team	Score	Home team	Inn.	Venue	Game duration	Attendance	Boxscore
Jun 26, 2015	09:30	Dominican Republic	8-1	Denmark	5	Gordon Howe Softball Park	1:29		Boxscore
Jun 26, 2015	10:00	Netherlands	1-11	Venezuela	4	Bob Van Impe Stadium	1:28		Boxscore
Jun 26, 2015	12:30	Japan	0-1	'Australia	7	Bob Van Impe Stadium	1:51		Boxscore
Jun 26, 2015	15:00	United States	7-0	Mexico	6	Bob Van Impe Stadium	1:55		Boxscore
Jun 27, 2015	11:30	Dominican Republic	4-6	United States	7	Gordon Howe Softball Park			Boxscore
Jun 27, 2015	12:30	Denmark	2-5	Japan	7	Bob Van Impe Stadium	2:07		Boxscore
Jun 27, 2015	14:00	Netherlands	0-8	Australia	7	Gordon Howe Softball Park			Boxscore
Jun 27, 2015	16:30	Mexico	1-6	Venezuela	7	Gordon Howe Softball Park	1:04		Boxscore
Jun 28, 2015	10:00	Denmark	2-0	Netherlands	7	Bob Van Impe Stadium	1:56		Boxscore
Jun 28, 2015	12:30	Dominican Republic	4-3	Mexico	7	Bob Van Impe Stadium	2:23		Boxscore
Jun 28, 2015	18:00	United States	4-5	Japan	7	Bob Van Impe Stadium	2:23		Boxscore
Jun 28, 2015	20:30	Australia	5-1	Venezuela	7	Bob Van Impe Stadium	2:12		Boxscore
Jun 29, 2015	13:00	United States	4-1	Netherlands	7	Gordon Howe Softball Park	1:36		Boxscore
Jun 29, 2015	15:00	Australia	3-5	Dominican Republic	7	Bob Van Impe Stadium	2:21		Boxscore
Jun 29, 2015	15:30	Denmark	2-6	Mexico	7	Gordon Howe Softball Park	1:50		Boxscore
Jun 29, 2015	20:30	Japan	0-3	Venezuela	7	Bob Van Impe Stadium	1:28		Boxscore
Jun 30, 2015	10:00	Netherlands	0-12	Mexico	4	Bob Van Impe Stadium	1:23		Boxscore
Jun 30, 2015	10:30	Denmark	2-8	Australia	7	Gordon Howe Softball Park	1:52		Boxscore
Jun 30, 2015	15:00	Dominican Republic	4-1	Japan	7	Bob Van Impe Stadium	1:54		Boxscore
Jun 30, 2015	20:30	United States	2-3	Venezuela	7	Bob Van Impe Stadium	2:52		Boxscore
Jul 1, 2015	12:30	Venezuela	5-4	Denmark	10	Bob Van Impe Stadium	3:32		Boxscore
Jul 1, 2015	13:00	Netherlands	3-8	Dominican Republic	7	Gordon Howe Softball Park	1:59		Boxscore
Jul 1, 2015	18:00	United States	0-8	Australia	5	Bob Van Impe Stadium	1:20		Boxscore
Jul 1, 2015	20:30	Japan	11-4	Mexico	5	Bob Van Impe Stadium	1:43		Boxscore
Jul 2, 2015	10:30	Venezuela	0-4	Dominican Republic	7	Gordon Howe Softball Park	1:40		Boxscore
Jul 2, 2015	13:00	Japan	9-1	Netherlands	5	Gordon Howe Softball Park	1:27		Boxscore
Jul 2, 2015	15:30	United States	9-2	Denmark	6	Gordon Howe Softball Park	1:49		Boxscore
Jul 2, 2015	20:30	Australia	3-10	Mexico	5	Bob Van Impe Stadium	1:11		Boxscore

== Championship Round ==
Quarterfinals/Elimination Finals: July 3, 2015
1	Canada	8
4	Australia	3
5	Japan	8
8	Czech Republic	3
6	Argentina	1
7	Venezuela	3
2	New Zealand	8
3	Dominican Republic	0

Semi-Finals: July 4, 2015
Japan	0
Australia	3
Venezuela	3
Dominican Republic	0

Preliminary Finals: July 4, 2015
Venezuela	4
Australia	0
Canada	5
New Zealand	9

Final: July 5, 2015
New Zealand	5
Canada	10

Date	Local time	Road team	Score	Home team	Inn.	Venue	Game duration	Attendance	Boxscore
Jul 3, 2015	13:00	Japan	8-3	Czech Republic	7	Bob Van Impe Stadium	2:22		Boxscore
Jul 3, 2015	15:30	Argentina	1-5	Venezuela	7	Bob Van Impe Stadium	2:25		Boxscore
Jul 3, 2015	18:30	Australia	3-8	Canada	7	Bob Van Impe Stadium	2:35		Boxscore
Jul 3, 2015	20:30	New Zealand	8-0	Dominican Republic	6	Bob Van Impe Stadium	2:39		Boxscore
Jul 4, 2015	12:30	Japan	0-3	Australia	7	Bob Van Impe Stadium	2:06		Boxscore
Jul 4, 2015	15:00	Venezuela	3-0	Dominican Republic	7	Bob Van Impe Stadium	2:05		Boxscore
Jul 4, 2015	17:30	New Zealand	9-5	Canada	7	Bob Van Impe Stadium	2:42		Boxscore
Jul 4, 2015	20:00	Venezuela	4-0	Australia	7	Bob Van Impe Stadium	2:24		Boxscore
Jul 5, 2015	15:30	New Zealand	5-10	Canada	7	Bob Van Impe Stadium	2:33		Boxscore

Bronze Medal Game: July 5, 2015
Venezuela	0
Canada	10

Date	Local time	Road team	Score	Home team	Inn.	Venue	Game duration	Attendance	Boxscore
Jul 5, 2015	11:30	Venezuela	0-10	Canada	4	Bob Van Impe Stadium	1:16		Boxscore

== Placement Round ==
Quarterfinals: July 3, 2015
A5	Great Britain	3
B8	Netherlands	2
B6	Mexico	7
A7	Philippines	0
B5	United States	7
A8	Indonesia	0 (Cancelled)
A6	Guatemala	3
B7	Denmark	1

Semi-Finals: July 4, 2015
Great Britain	5
Mexico	7
United States	4
Guatemala	0

Fifth Place Game: July 4, 2015
United States	4
Mexico	3

Date	Local time	Road team	Score	Home team	Inn.	Venue	Game duration	Attendance	Boxscore
Jul 3, 2015	10:30	Netherlands	2-3	Great Britain	7	Bob Van Impe Stadium	2:03		Boxscore
Jul 3, 2015	11:00	United States	Cancelled (7-0)	Indonesia		Gordon Howe Softball Park			
Jul 3, 2015	13:30	Denmark	1-3	Guatemala	7	Gordon Howe Softball Park	1:36		Boxscore
Jul 3, 2015	16:00	Philippines	0-7	Mexico	6	Gordon Howe Softball Park	1:33		Boxscore
Jul 4, 2015	10:00	Mexico	7-5	Great Britain	7	Bob Van Impe Stadium	2:17		Boxscore
Jul 4, 2015	10:00	Guatemala	0-4	United States	7	Gordon Howe Softball Park	1:49		Boxscore
Jul 4, 2015	15:30	United States	4-3	Mexico	7	Gordon Howe Softball Park	1:46		Boxscore

== Final standings ==
Rk	Team	W	L
1	Canada	10	1
2	New Zealand	7	3
3	Venezuela	7	3
4	Australia	6	4
5	Dominican Republic	6	3
6	Japan	5	4
7	Czech Republic	5	3
8	Argentina	5	3
Failed to qualify for Playoffs
9	United States	7	3
10	Mexico	4	6
11	Great Britain	4	5
12	Guatemala	3	6
13	Denmark	1	7
14	Philippines	1	7
15	Netherlands	0	8
