= 1974 Asian Men's Softball Championship =

Tournament details
- Host country: Philippines
- Dates: March 1974
- Teams: 6
- Defending champions: Philippines

Final positions
- Champions: Philippines (2nd title)
- Runner-up: Japan

The 1974 Asian Men's Softball Championship was an international softball tournament which was held in Marikina, Philippines. It was a six-nation nine-day tournament which began on 16 March 1974.

== Participants ==
- Indonesia
- Hong Kong
- Japan
- Philippines
- Singapore
- Taiwan
