= List of sports venues in the Greater Manila Area =

The following is a list of sports venues found in the Greater Manila Area in the Philippines which are in current use.

In July 2014, the Philippine Sports Stadium and the Philippine Arena opened in Santa Maria and Bocaue, Bulacan. They are the largest football stadium and indoor arena in the Philippines and served as the venue for some of the 2015 AFC Cup group stage matches and the first Philippine Basketball Association games for the 2014–15 season.

In 2012, the ₱3.6 billion Mall of Asia Arena opened within the SM Mall of Asia complex in Pasay. This indoor arena hosted the 2013 FIBA Asia Championship. Other popular venues in the region include the Smart Araneta Coliseum in Quezon City, which hosts several professional and collegiate basketball leagues, and the Rizal Memorial Stadium in Malate which is home to both the Philippine national football team and the Philippines national rugby union team.

== Indoor arenas ==
Venue	Location	Tenants/Use	Capacity	Opened	Notes
Alonte Sports Arena	Biñan, Laguna	General	6,500	2013	
Blue Eagle Gym	Quezon City	Ateneo Blue Eagles, Maharlika Pilipinas Basketball League	7,500	1949	
Cuneta Astrodome	Pasay	NAASCU basketball, Philippine Basketball Association, Philippine Super Liga	12,000	1993	
Playtime Filoil Centre	San Juan	Filoil EcoOil Preseason Cup, UAAP basketball, NCAA Philippines basketball, Shakey's V-League	5,000	2006	
Makati Coliseum	Makati	NAASCU basketball, Maharlika Pilipinas Basketball League	12,000	1998	
Marikina Sports Center Gymnasium	Marikina	General	7,000	1969	
Ninoy Aquino Stadium	Malate	Philippine Basketball Association	6,000	1953	
Philippine Arena	Bocaue, Bulacan	General	55,000	2014	World's largest indoor arena
PhilSports Arena	Pasig	Philippine Basketball Association, UAAP basketbakk	10,000	1985	
Rizal Memorial Coliseum	Malate	General	6,100	1934	
San Juan Gym	San Juan	General	2,000	2001	
SM Mall of Asia Arena	Pasay	Manila Mavericks, Philippine Basketball Association, Philippines men's national basketball team, UAAP basketball, NCAA Philippines basketball, Shakey's V-League	20,000	2012	
Smart Araneta Coliseum	Quezon City	Philippine Basketball Association, Philippines men's national basketball team, UAAP basketball, NCAA Philippines basketball	25,000	1960	
UST Quadricentennial Pavilion	Sampaloc	UST Growling Tigers	5,792	2011	
Ynares Center	Antipolo, Rizal	Philippine Basketball Association	12,000	2001	
Ynares Sports Arena	Pasig	General	3,000	2008	

== Stadiums ==
Venue	Location	Tenants/Use	Capacity	Opened	Notes
Amoranto Sports Complex Main Stadium	Quezon City	General	15,000	1966	
Biñan Football Field	Biñan, Laguna	General	2,500	2015	
FEU Diliman Field	Quezon City	UAAP football, FEU Tamaraw Booters		2013	
Marikina Sports Center Football Field	Marikina	General	15,000	1969	
McKinley Hill Stadium	Bonifacio Global City	Philippines Football League	2,000	2013	
Nomads Field	Parañaque	Philippines Football League, Manila Nomads Sports Club		1969	
Philippine Sports Stadium	Bocaue, Bulacan	General	20,000	2014	
PhilSports Football and Athletics Stadium	Pasig	Philippines national football team, Philippines women's national football team, National Capital Region F.A.	20,000	1985	
Rizal Memorial Baseball Stadium	Malate	Philippines national baseball team, Philippine Baseball League, UAAP baseball	10,000	1934	
Rizal Memorial Stadium	Malate	Philippines national football team, Philippines women's national football team, Philippines national rugby union team, United Football League, UAAP football, NCAA Philippines football	12,000	1934	
Rosario Sports Complex Field	Pasig	Philippines men's national softball team		1990	
University of Makati Stadium	Taguig	United Football League, UMak Herons	4,000	1972	

== Aquatics center ==
Venue	Location	Tenants/Use	Capacity	Opened	Notes
Teofilo Yldefonso Swimming Pool	Malate	Philippine national aquatics team	–	1934	
Makati Aqua Sports Arena	Taguig	General	–	1990	
Muntinlupa Aquatic Center	Marikina	General	1,200	2022	
Ayala Vermosa Sports Hub	Imus, Cavite	General	–	2022	

== Pitches ==
Venue	Location	Tenants/Use	Opened	Notes
Ateneo Moro Lorenzo Field	Quezon City	UAAP Collegiate Football Tournaments, Agila F.C. Ateneo Blue Booters and Ateneo Lady Blue Booters,	2001	
University of the Philippines Football Pitch	Quezon City	UAAP Collegiate Football Tournaments, UP Fighting Maroons Men's Football, UP Fighting Maroons Women's Football	2018	
CV Pitch, Circulo Verde	Quezon City	General	2009	
Marikina Sports Center	Marikina	JPV Marikina FC, General	2017	
Marikina Town Center Football Field	Marikina	General	2025	
Atleta63 Football Field, Bridgetowne Destination Estates	Pasig	East Football United, Silangan FC	2019	
University of Santo Tomas Field	Sampaloc, Manila	UST Golden Booters and Lady Golden Booters		
adidas Football Park at MOA Sky, SM Mall of Asia	Pasay	General	2025	
Turf BGC	Bonifacio Global City	General	2012	
Middle Field, International School Manila	Taguig	Bearcats Football Team	2002	
Soccer Field, International School Manila	Taguig	Bearcats Football Team	2002	
Multi-Purpose Field, British School Manila	Taguig	Lions Football Team	2001	
Arca South Pitch	Taguig	General	2024	
Gatorade-Chelsea Blue Pitch	Circuit Makati	Chelsea FC, Philippine–American Football League	2014	
University of Makati	Makati	University of Makati Men's & Women's Football Team	1990	
Circuit Makati Blue Pitch	Makati	General	2013	
Tahanan Village Football Field	Parañaque	Team Socceroo Football Club, General	1975	
Club United	Merville Subdivision, Parañaque	General	2017	
San Beda Alabang Football Pitch	Alabang Hills Village, Muntinlupa	San Beda Red Lions	1972	
PAREF Southridge School Football Pitch	Hillsborough Subdivision, Muntinlupa	Southridge Admirals Football Team	1979	
Julius K. Quiambao Field, De La Salle Santiago Zobel School	Ayala Alabang Village, Muntinlupa	Zobel Junior Archers and Lady Junior Archers	2024	
Cuenca Football Field	Ayala Alabang Village, Muntinlupa	General	1975	
Muntinlupa Track & Field Oval	Muntinlupa	General	2022	
Brent International School Football Field	Biñan, Laguna	General	1999	
Villar Island Football Field	Bacoor, Cavite	General	2024	
Ayala Vermosa Sports Hub	Imus, Cavite	General	2018	
Imus Track & Field Oval	Imus, Cavite	General	2022	
De La Salle University – Dasmariñas Oval Field	Dasmariñas, Cavite	DLSUD United Patriots	1977	

== Bowling alleys ==
- AMF-Puyat Bowling Center
  - Commonwealth Lanes, Ever Gotesco (Quezon City)
  - Coronado Lanes, Starmall EDSA-Shaw (Mandaluyong)
  - Super Bowl, Makati Square "Formerly Makati Cinema Square" (Makati)
  - Bowling Alley San Antonio (Parañaque)
- Paeng's Bowl & Billiard Room
  - Eastwood CityWalk II (Quezon City)
  - Gateway Mall 2 (Quezon City)
  - Robinsons Galleria (Quezon City)
  - Robinsons Place Manila (Ermita)
- SM Bowling Center
  - SM City Valenzuela (Valenzuela)
  - SM City Fairview (Quezon City)
  - SM North EDSA (Quezon City)
  - SM Megamall (Mandaluyong)
  - SM Mall of Asia (Pasay)
  - SM Southmall (Las Piñas)
  - SM City Sucat (Parañaque)

== Golf ==
- Alabang Golf Country Club (Muntinlupa)
- Army Golf Club (Fort Bonifacio)
- Camp Aguinaldo Golf Club (Quezon City)
- Capitol Hills Golf and Country Club (Quezon City)
- Club Intramuros Golf Course (Intramuros)
- Manila Golf and Country Club (Makati)
- Philippine Navy Golf Club (Fort Bonifacio)
- Veterans Golf Course (Quezon City)
- Villamor Golf Course (Pasay)
- Wack Wack Golf and Country Club (Mandaluyong)

== Ice rinks ==
- SM Mall of Asia (Pasay)
- SM Megamall (Mandaluyong)
- SM Southmall (Las Piñas)

== Jai alai ==
- Casino Español de Manila (Ermita)

== Marinas, Yacht & Boat Clubs ==
- Manila Yacht Club (Malate)
- National Sailing Center, Cultural Center of the Philippines Complex, Pasay
- Laguna Lakeside Boat Club, San Pedro, Laguna
- Caylabne Bay Resort & Marina, Ternate, Cavite

== Polo and equestrian ==
- Manila Polo Club (Makati)
- Los Tamaraos Polo & Equestrian Center, Las Piñas
- Alabang Country Club, Muntinlupa

== Racing venues ==
=== Motor racing tracks ===
- Carmona Racing Circuit (Carmona, Cavite)
- Citykart Racing, Circuit Makati (Makati)

=== Horse-racing tracks ===
- San Lazaro Race Track, San Lazaro Leisure Park (Carmona, Cavite)
- Santa Ana Race Track, Saddle and Clubs Leisure Park (Naic, Cavite)

== Tennis ==
- Brittany Tennis Club (Quezon City)
- Club Filipino (San Juan)
- Makati Sports Club (Makati)
- Philippine Columbian Sports Club (Paco)
- Quezon City Sports Club (Quezon City)
- Rizal Memorial Sports Complex (Malate)
- The Metropolitan Club (Makati)
- The Village Sports Club (Parañaque)
- Valle Verde Country Club (Pasig)

== Gallery ==
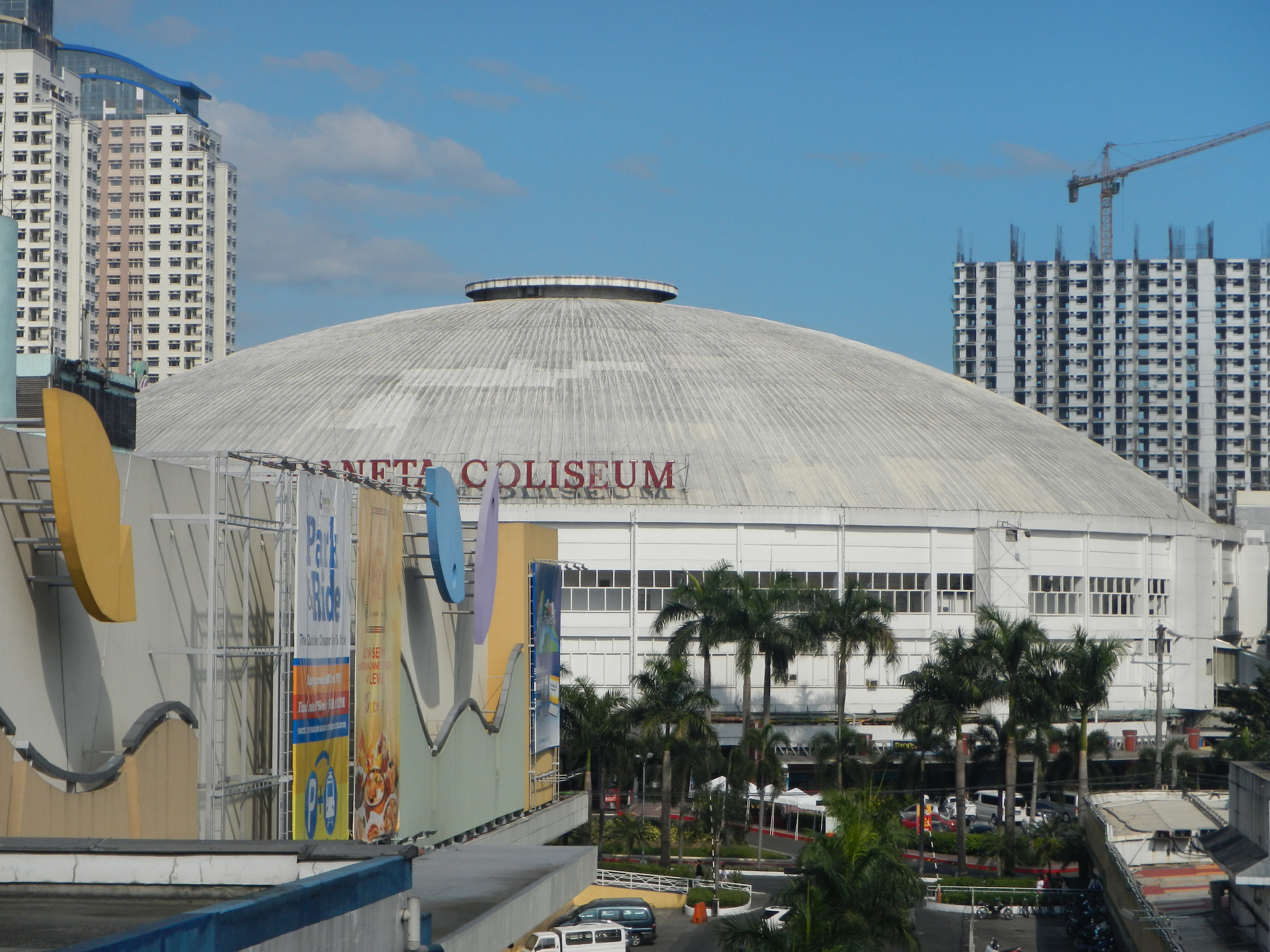
Smart Araneta Coliseum

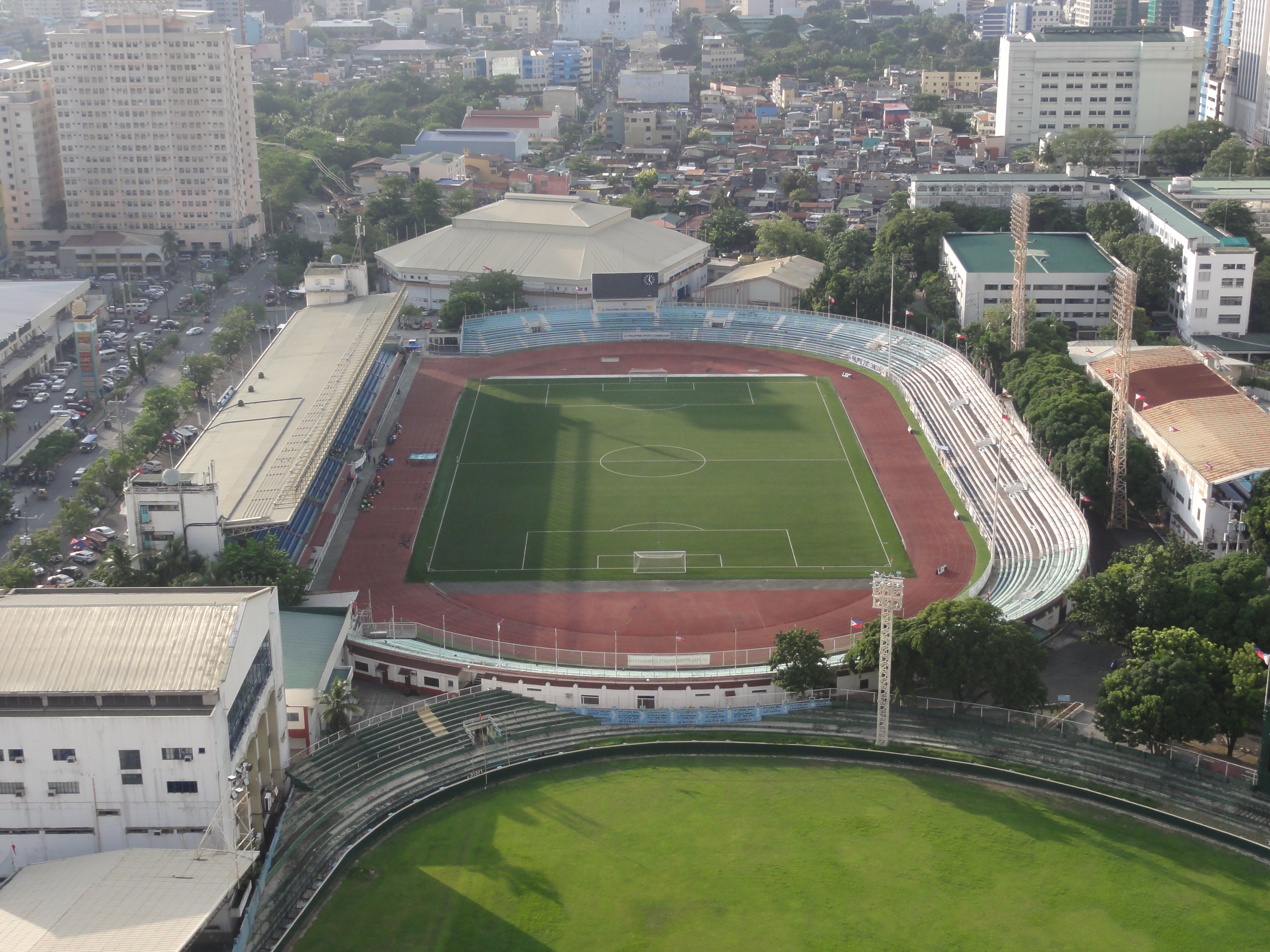
Rizal Memorial Stadium

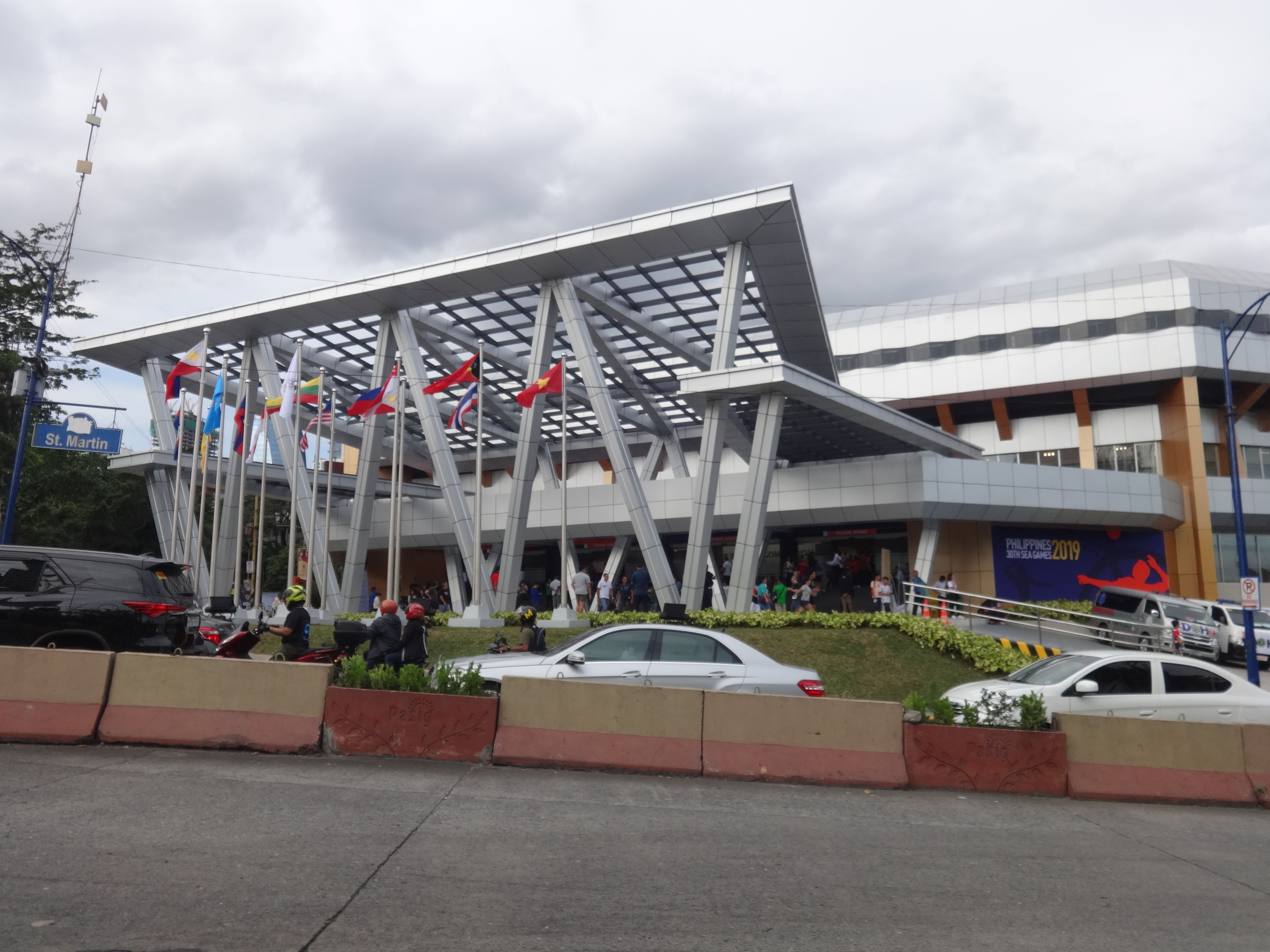
PhilSports Arena

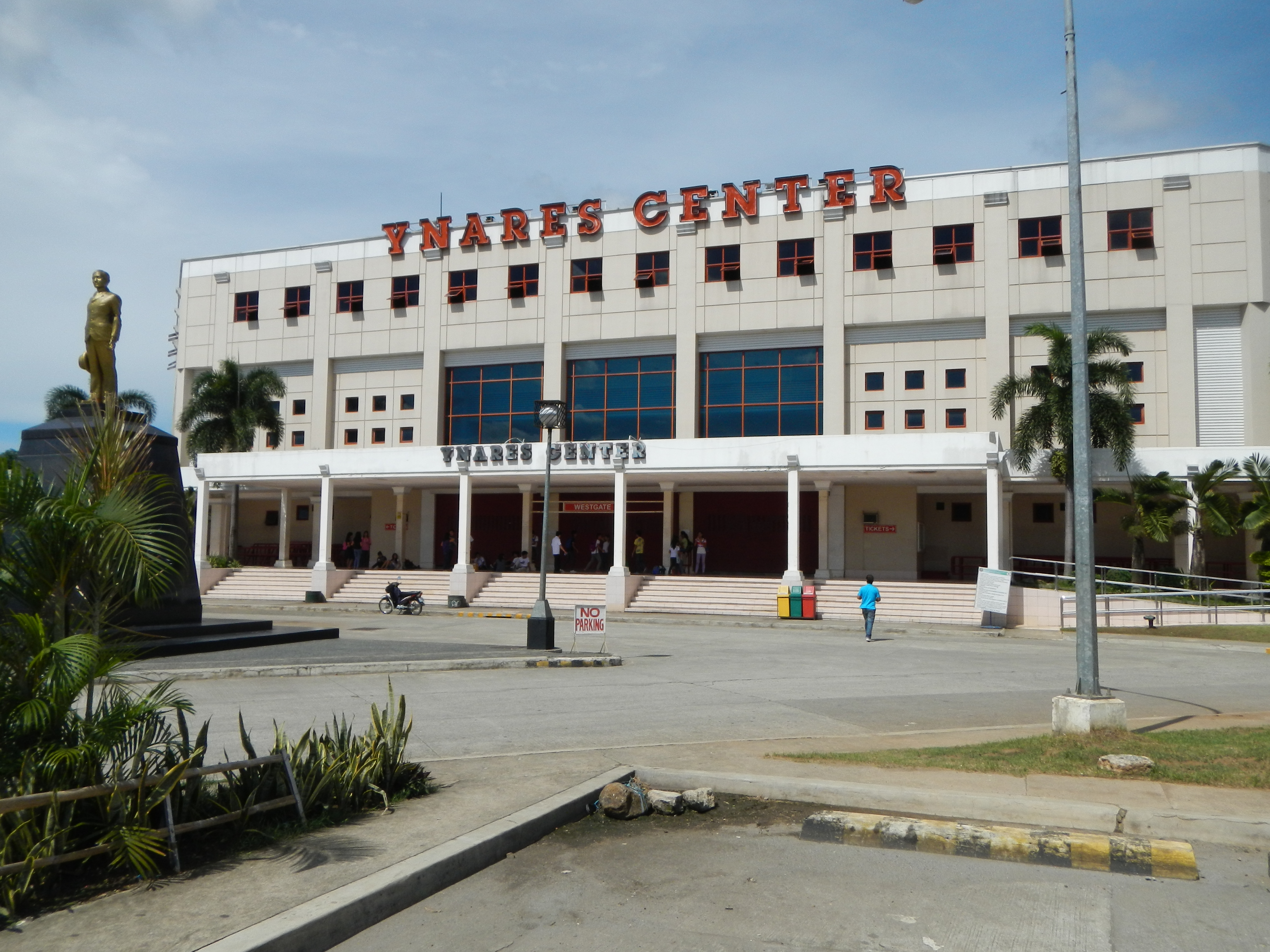
Ynares Center

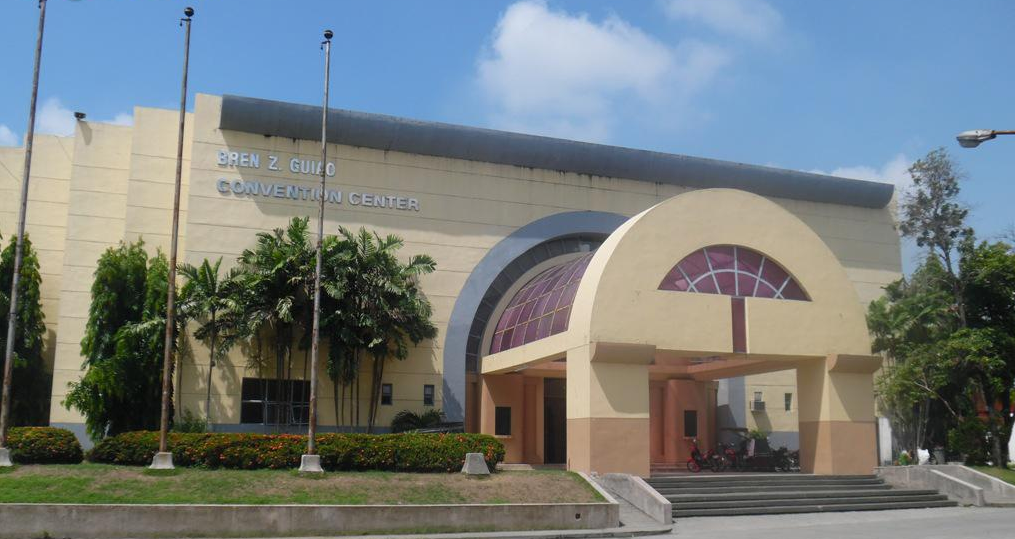
Bren Z. Guiao Convention Center

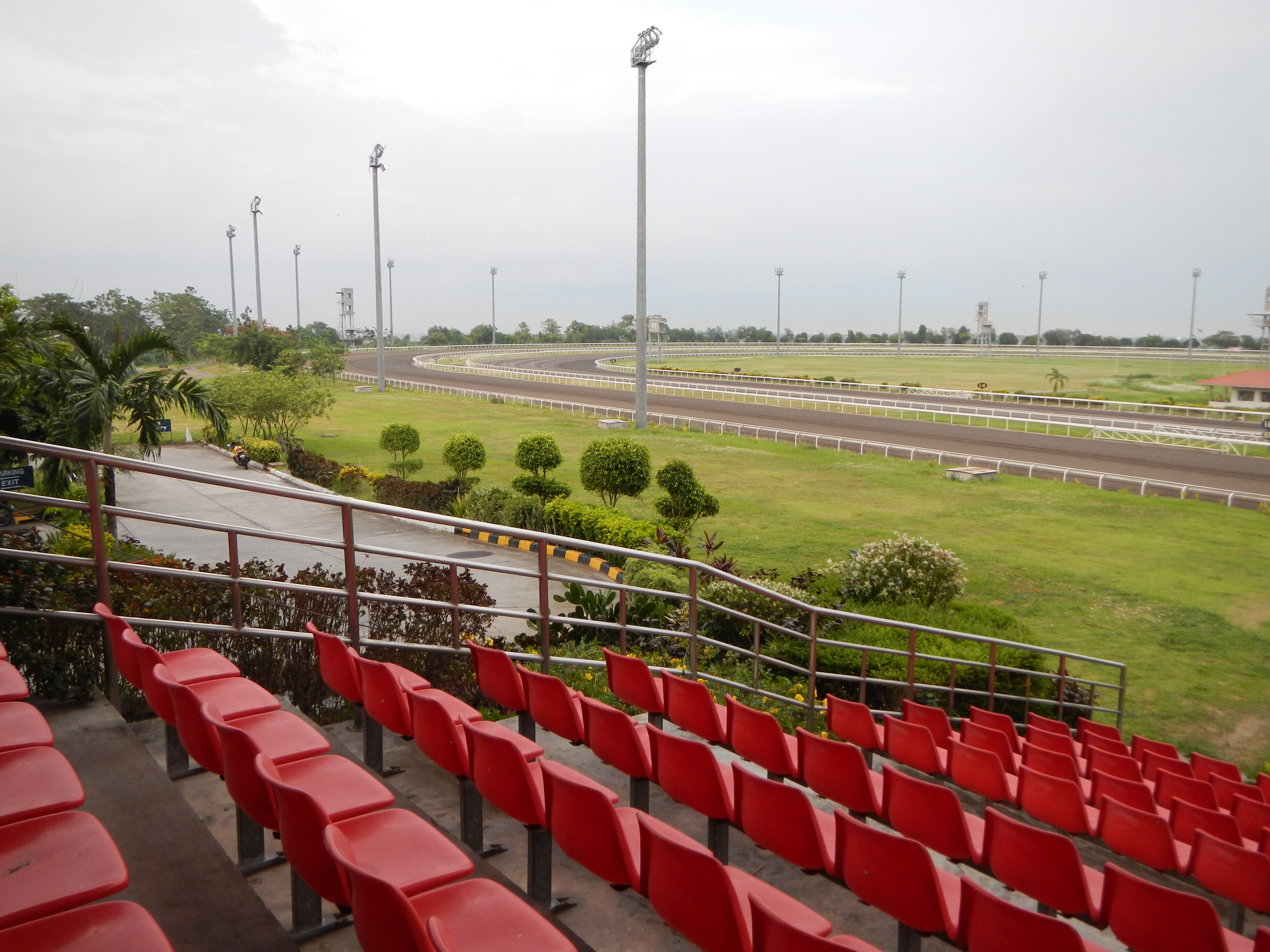
San Lazaro Race Track

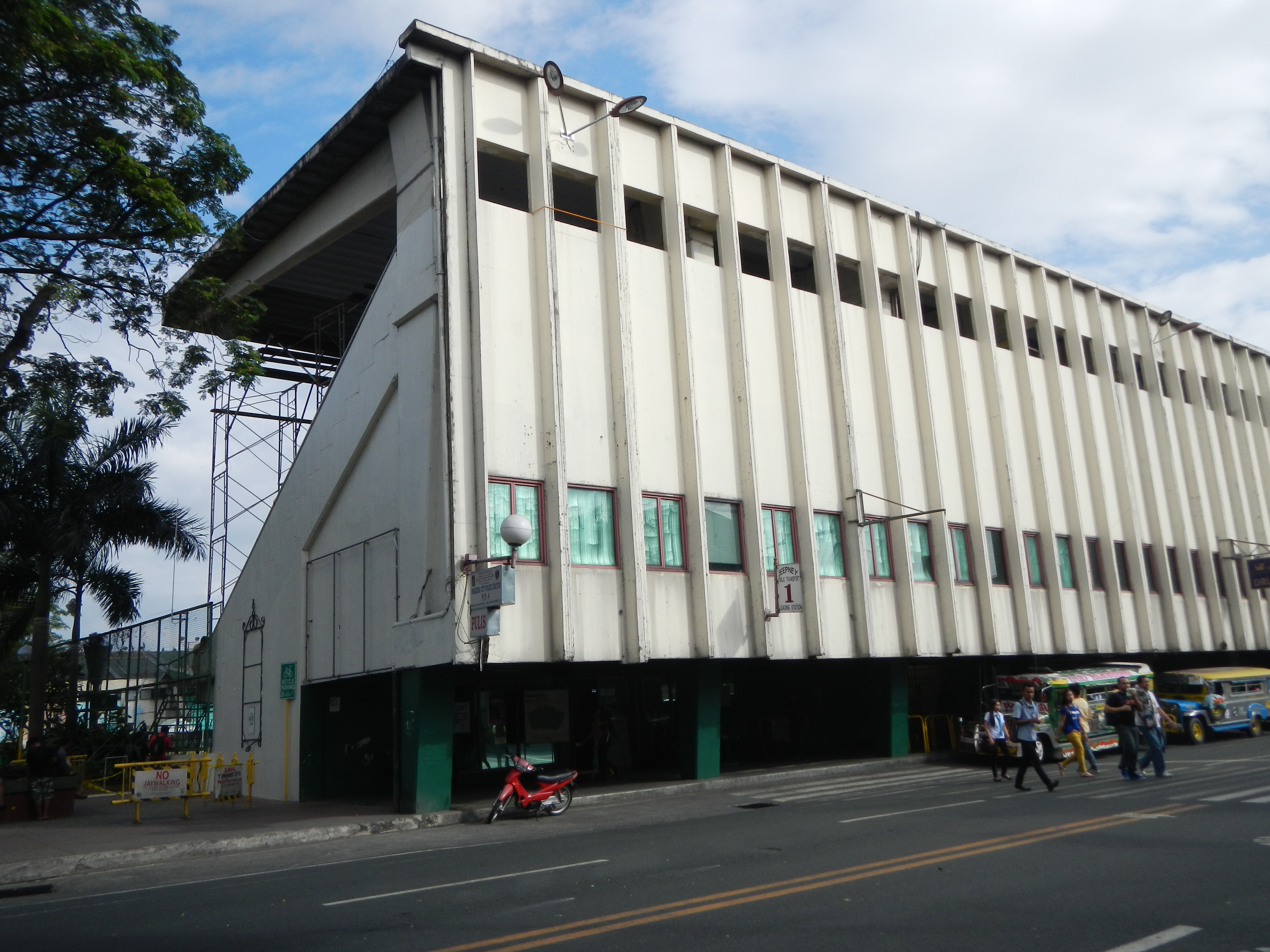
Marikina Sports Center

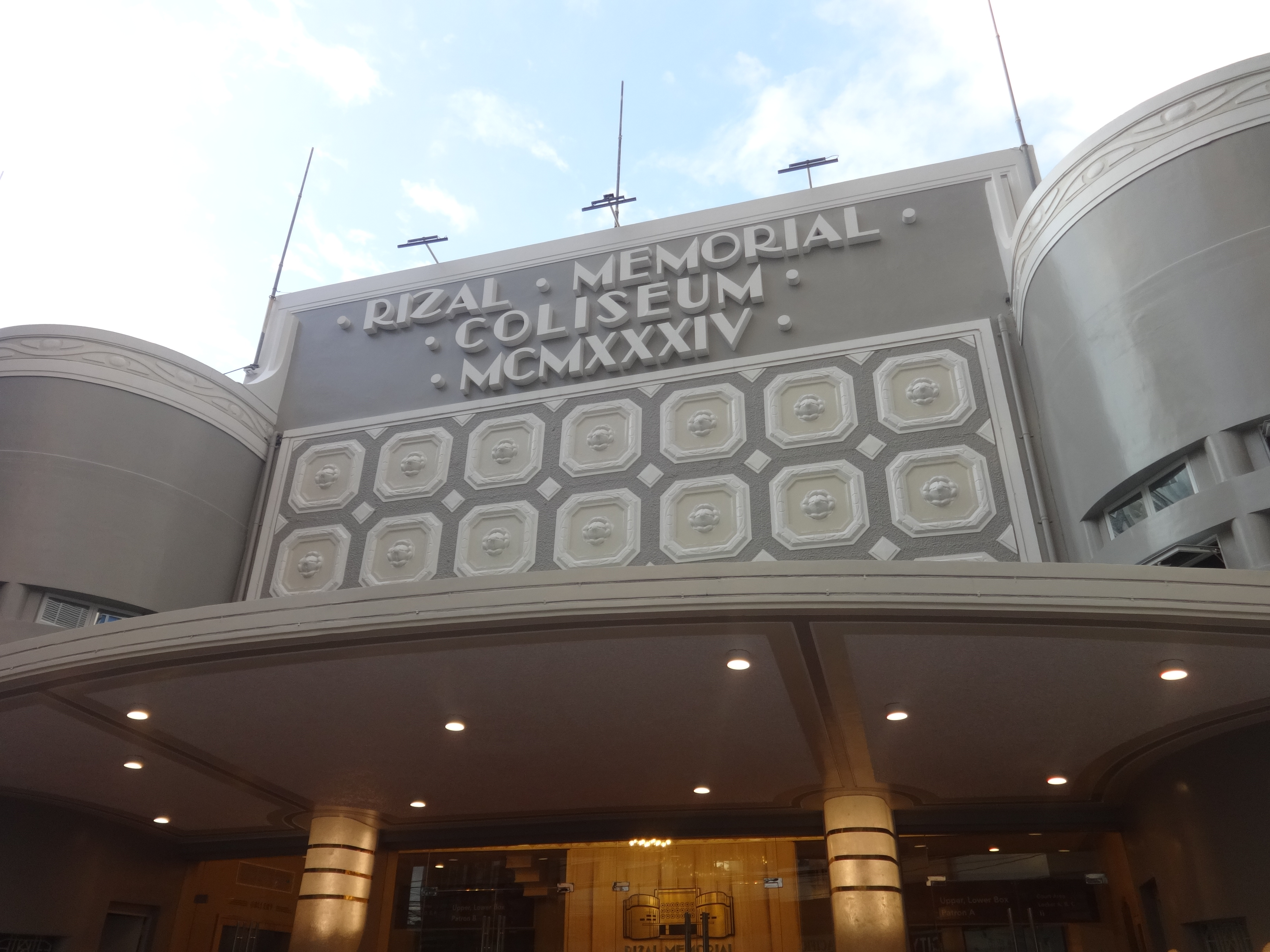
Rizal Memorial Coliseum

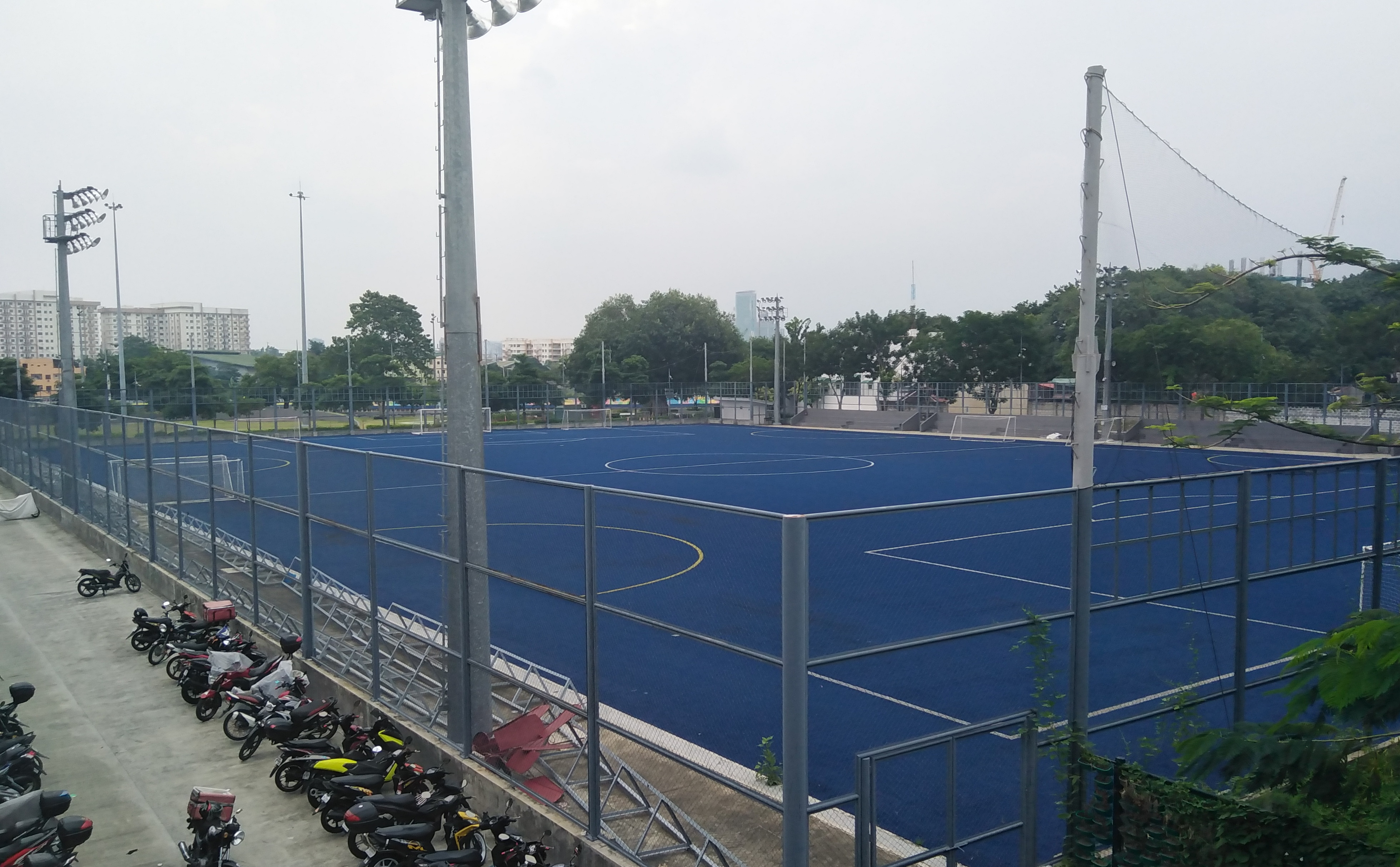
Circuit Makati Blue Pitch

== See also ==
- List of sporting events in the Greater Manila Area
