= 2014 Asian Men's Softball Championship =

Tournament details
- Host country: Singapore
- Dates: 16–20 December 2014
- Teams: 6
- Defending champions: Japan

Final positions
- Champions: Japan (7th title)
- Runner-up: Philippines
- Third place: Indonesia

The 2014 Asian Men's Softball Championship was an international softball tournament which featured six nations which was held from 16 to 20 December 2014. The games were held at the Kallang Softball Diamond Stadium in Singapore. The top three teams qualified for the 2015 ISF Men's World Championship which was held in Saskatoon, Canada. Japan became champions of the tournament winning their sixth consecutive title.

== Participants ==
- Brunei
- Indonesia
- Japan
- Pakistan
- Philippines
- Singapore
