= 1968 Asian Men's Softball Championship =

Tournament details
- Host country: Philippines
- Dates: February 1968
- Teams: 5
- Defending champions: None

Final positions
- Champions: Philippines (1st title)
- Runner-up: Japan
- Third place: Taiwan
- Fourth place: Hong Kong

The 1968 Asian Men's Softball Championship was an international softball tournament which was held in Manila, Philippines. This is the first edition of the tournament.The nine-day tournament was held in February 1968.

The Philippines were champions by the end of the tournament.

== Final standings ==
Rank	Team
Gold medal	Philippines
Silver medal	Japan
Bronze medal	Taiwan
4th	Hong Kong
5th	Singapore
