= Softball at the 2005 SEA Games =

- Venue: Rosario Sports Complex
- Dates: 30 November – 4 December 2005
- Competitors: M: 3 W: 4

Softball at the 2005 Southeast Asian Games took place in the Rosario Sports Complex in Pasig, Philippines from November 30, 2005 to December 4, 2005.

Softball last featured in the SEA Games in the 1997 edition.

The Philippines won both men's and the women's tournaments.

== Participating nations ==
Three nations entered the men's tournament while four nations entered the women's tournament.

- Indonesia
- Malaysia (men's only)
- Philippines
- Singapore (women's only)
- Thailand (women's only)

== Medal winners ==
Event	Gold	Silver	Bronze
Men's	Philippines	Indonesia	Malaysia
Women's	Philippines	Indonesia	Thailand

== Results ==
=== Men's tournament ===
==== Final ====
December 1, 2005	Philippines	4–3	Indonesia
December 1, 2005		Boxscore

=== Women's tournament ===
==== Final ====
December 1, 2005	Philippines	1–0	Indonesia
December 1, 2005		Boxscore
