= 1996 Men's Softball World Championship =

Championship tournament for men's softball, 1996

Tournament details
- Host country: United States
- Dates: July 5 – 13
- Teams: 22
- Defending champions: Canada

Final positions
- Champions: New Zealand
- Runner-up: Canada
- Third place: Japan
- Fourth place: United States

The 1996 ISF Men's World Championship was an international softball tournament. The tournament was held in Midland, Michigan. It was the 9th time the World Championship took place. Twenty two nations competed, including defending champions Canada.

== Final standings ==
Rk	Team	W	L
1	New Zealand	14	0
2	Canada	13	2
3	Japan	10	5
4	United States	10	4
5	Mexico	9	3
6	Venezuela	9	3
7	Australia	7	4
8	South Africa	7	4
Failed to qualify for Playoffs
9	Argentina	7	3
10	Puerto Rico	5	5
11	Bahamas	5	5
12	Czech Republic	5	5
13	Netherlands	5	5
14	Chinese Taipei	4	6
15	Denmark	3	7
16	Northern Mariana Islands	3	7
17	South Korea	2	8
18	Botswana	1	9
19	Papua New Guinea	1	9
20	Israel	1	9
21	Russia	1	9
22	Pakistan	0	10
