= Softball at the 2025 SEA Games =

- Venue: Rajamangala University of Technology Thanyaburi, Thanyaburi
- Location: Pathum Thani, Thailand
- Dates: 10–18 December 2025
- Nations: 5

Champions
- Men: Philippines
- Women: Philippines

Softball competitions at the 2025 SEA Games took place at Rajamangala University of Technology Thanyaburi in Thanyaburi, Pathum Thani, Thailand from 10 to 18 December 2025. Medals were awarded in 2 events, which are men and women tournament.

== Participating nations ==
Nation	Men	Women
Indonesia	No	Yes
Malaysia	Yes	Yes
Philippines	Yes	Yes
Singapore	Yes	Yes
Thailand	Yes	Yes
Total: 5 NOCs	4	5

== Medal table ==
* Host nation (Thailand)

Rank	Nation	Gold	Silver	Bronze	Total
1	Philippines	2	0	0	2
2	Singapore	0	2	0	2
3	Thailand*	0	0	2	2
Totals (3 entries)		2	2	2	6

== Medalists ==
Event	Gold	Silver	Bronze
Men's tournament	Philippines; John Israel Antonio; Denmark Bathan; Rustom Cantos; John Ken Angelo Caringal; Jehanz Coro; Melvin De Castro; Lyonas De Leon; Juliuz Rosh Dela Cruz; Kim Carlo Garcia; Mark Janzen Gaspi; Francis Generoso; John Norwen Lucas; Reagan Parco; Justine John Rosales; Mark Joseph Sarmiento; Kenneth Torres	Singapore; Shun Kai Cheoh; Marcus Shi Phng Chew; Say Kian Foo; Yuchou Dominic Han; Fu Xun Raynard Heng; Malcolm Rhys Jian Jun Lim; Matthew Jing Xiang Lim; Zu Ray Low; Mohammad Huzaifah Noorham; Mohammad Huzaifie Noorham; Zachar Oh; Ziglar Oh; Schuyler Jia Le Seah; Ding Quan Ivan Tan; Joshua Ri Ming Tan; Tai Jin Jeron Tan	Thailand; Anakkawit Butyojanto; Pakorn Chaikaew; Mahannop Dechsri; Khajornsak Jeenkhajorn; Akaradech Jitpong; Ratchanon Khrueaprommin; Thanapath Loivanich; Phongsathon Nituthon; Kunaphan Phoophat; Sakai Phraechai; Sanyalak Pipatpinyo; Wetphisit Raknoi; Suepsak Somsuai; Chanatip Thongbai; Phoomwut Wutthikorn; Ratchanon Yangsuwan
Women's tournament	Philippines; Mark Joy Alpitche; Roma Jane Cruz; Alyysa Marie Daniell; Skylynne Kopia Ellazar; Ma Angelu Gabriel; Nicole Adra Hammoude; Mary Jane Libaton; Ma Victoria Magbanua; Neo May Mahinay; April Mae Minanga; Royevel Palma; Angel Joanna Pascual; Jhaycel Roldan; Ma Charlotte Narces Sales; Alaiza Talisik; Reyae Mae Villamin	Singapore; You Hua Michelle Chai; Jia En Chia; Stefani Jing Yi Choong; Charmaine Jia Ying Chua; Si Ning Chua; Teresa Ai Xin Chua; Yun Fang Charlize Goh; Adelia Rui Wen Koh; Andrea Ying Hui Lim; Wei En Shanice Lim; Ying Jie Eliza Lim; Wan Yu Liow; Kylene Yan Ting Loo; Cacia Xian Yin Tan; Jean Wen Bowie Tan; Zu Yun Tay	Thailand; Meentra Chokkhachonphaisan; Anchalee Hengpanyakul; Jirarak Kako; Sirapat Kasornsuwan; Puntaree Khamhintang; Warisa Mankong; Kanokwan Phadungcharoen; Konraphin Sae Yang; Rungarun Saeyang; Thirayu Sakcharoenchaikun; Nanthicha Siriwadee; Waranya Suanthong; Yanisa Suwannaree; Mechawee Thanachanthonwaj; Thanaporn Tipdee; Pharitta Walaiphan
