= Softball at the 2015 SEA Games =

- Venue: Kallang Softball Field
- Dates: 6–10 June 2015
- Competitors: 170 from 5 nations

Softball at the 2015 Southeast Asian Games was held at Kallang Softball Field of the Singapore Sports Hub at Kallang, Singapore from 6 to 10 June 2015.

== Participating nations ==
A total of 170 athletes from five nations competed in softball at the 2015 Southeast Asian Games:

- Indonesia (34)
- Malaysia (34)
- Philippines (34)
- Singapore (34)
- Thailand (34)

== Competition schedule ==
The following was the competition schedule for the softball competitions:

P	Preliminaries	½	Semifinals	B	Bronze medal match	F	Final

Event↓/Date →	Sat 6	Sun 7	Mon 8	Tue 9	Wed 10	
Men's tournament	P	P	P	½	B	F
Women's tournament	P	P	P	½	B	F

== Medalists ==
Event	Gold	Silver	Bronze
Men	Philippines (PHI); Isidro Abello; Sonny Boy Acuna; Emerson Atilano; Denmark Bathan; Orlando Binarao; Oscar Iv Bradshaw; Jasper Cabrera; Edmer Del Socorro; Vermon Diaz; Jeffry Hardillo; Ben Maravilles; Gregorio Marquez; William Jess Mendoza; Anthony Olaez; Saxon Omandac; Joseph Orillana; Apolonio Rosales	Indonesia (INA); Heryanto Nasrun Badilla; Anggana Budiman; Muhammad Ahsya Darwis; Dikdik Fauzi Dermawan; Bambang Rachmat Dwitama; Hermansyah; Otto Wahyu Minarto; Syaiful Nurdin; Reza Nurman; Jesse Parengkuan; Dedy Purnomo; Toni Pribadi Jaya Putra; Aditya Aulia Rachman; Rizki Ramadhan; Teuku Ridwan; Ahmad Trasuan Sularama; Michael Trisnadi	Singapore (SIN); Niels Wallace Aplin; Chew Jee Boon; Chua Hui Fu; Kenny Goh Keng Ngee; Dominic Han Yuchou; Lau Kuan Hup; Samuel Lee Kuan Jie; Lew Cheng Chye; Ivan Ng Ee Han; Ngiam Jun Jie; Benjamin Oh Zhi Yong; Joshua Jun Wen Tam; Jerel Tan Jian Han; Watson Tan Jun Kai; Jeron Tan Tai Jin; Tan Yi Rui; Bayden Wang Zhengrong
Women	Philippines (PHI); Lorna Adorable; Veronica Belleza; Francesca Altomonte; Annalie Benjamen; Rizza Bernardino; Garnet Agnes Blando; Shaira Damasing; Luzviminda Embudo; Marlyn Francisco; Florabele Pabiania; Maria Celestine Palma; Elma Parohinog; Cristy Joy Roa; Kriska Piad; Queeny Sabobo; Angelie Ursabia; Arianne Vallestero	Thailand (THA); Waranya Buaphan; Kantrakorn Jittsaree; Kanjanaporn Klomklom; Chompoonut Klongseema; Waraporn Konyuen; Tassaneewan Kwaopanya; Pinit Lee-udom; Sasithorn Neangjumnong; Natthaya Paengma; Parima Phandakiri; Wannaporn Punjaroen; Thanapan Saisud; Paweena Sangkong; Suwanan Singhaampon; Ancheera Sirimaha; Nareerat Sutta; Vasana Teewavech	Singapore (SIN); Cheang Wai Foon; Zesa Tania Xinyan Chen; Agatha May Yen Cheong; Sue Mae Ching; Sharon Wei Ling Choo; Magdelyn Chow Ming Ying; Elaine Ling Ling Chua; Sonia Gan Hsiu Lun; Lina Goh; Guo Yan Xiuyan; Meisian Kang; Keong Yumei; Khor Ning Min; Michelle Koh Aimei; Claire Lim; Lim Hui Neng; Cerigwen Ng Jing Hui

== Medal table ==
* Host nation (Singapore)

Rank	Nation	Gold	Silver	Bronze	Total
1	Philippines	2	0	0	2
2	Indonesia	0	1	0	1
2	Thailand	0	1	0	1
4	Singapore*	0	0	2	2
Totals (4 entries)		2	2	2	6

== Events ==
=== Men's tournament ===
Softball – Men at the 2015 SEA Games
- Dates: 6–10 June 2015
- Nations: 5

Medalists
gold medal	Philippines (PHI)
silver medal	Indonesia (INA)
bronze medal	Singapore (SIN)

==== Results – Preliminary Round ====
Teams	W	L	Pct.	GB	R	RA
Philippines	4	0	1.000	—	37	15
Singapore	3	1	0.750	1	21	12
Indonesia	2	2	0.600	2	20	13
Malaysia	1	3	0.400	3	4	28
Thailand	0	4	0.200	4	3	17

6 June 2015; 8:30	Thailand	1 – 2	Indonesia	Kallang Softball Field, Kallang
6 June 2015; 8:30		Boxscore		Kallang Softball Field, Kallang

6 June 2015; 11:10	Malaysia	0 – 10	Singapore	Kallang Softball Field, Kallang
6 June 2015; 11:10		Boxscore		Kallang Softball Field, Kallang

6 June 2015; 13:45	Philippines	8 – 1	Thailand	Kallang Softball Field, Kallang
6 June 2015; 13:45		Boxscore		Kallang Softball Field, Kallang

6 June 2015; 13:45	Indonesia	10 – 0	Malaysia	Kallang Softball Field, Kallang
6 June 2015; 13:45		Boxscore		Kallang Softball Field, Kallang

7 June 2015; 15:00	Thailand	1 – 4	Singapore	Kallang Softball Field, Kallang
7 June 2015; 15:00		Boxscore		Kallang Softball Field, Kallang

7 June 2015; 17:30	Malaysia	1 – 8	Philippines	Kallang Softball Field, Kallang
7 June 2015; 17:30		Boxscore		Kallang Softball Field, Kallang

7 June 2015; 20:00	Singapore	2 – 0	Indonesia	Kallang Softball Field, Kallang
7 June 2015; 20:00		Boxscore		Kallang Softball Field, Kallang

8 June 2015; 8:30	Philippines	10 – 8	Indonesia	Kallang Softball Field, Kallang
8 June 2015; 8:30		Boxscore		Kallang Softball Field, Kallang

8 June 2015; 12:30	Malaysia	3 – 0	Thailand	Kallang Softball Field, Kallang
8 June 2015; 12:30		Boxscore		Kallang Softball Field, Kallang

8 June 2015; 15:00	Philippines	11 – 5	Singapore	Kallang Softball Field, Kallang
8 June 2015; 15:00		Boxscore		Kallang Softball Field, Kallang

==== Results – Final round ====
Semifinal; 9 June
Philippines (PHI)	8
Singapore (SIN)	0
Indonesia (INA)	15
Malaysia (MAS)	0

Final; 10 June
Indonesia (INA)	4
Singapore (SIN)	0

Grand final 10 June
Indonesia (INA)	4
Philippines (PHI)	6

9 June 2015; 8:30	Philippines	8 – 0	Singapore	Kallang Softball Field, Kallang
9 June 2015; 8:30		Boxscore		Kallang Softball Field, Kallang

9 June 2015; 12:00	Indonesia	15 – 0	Malaysia	Kallang Softball Field, Kallang
9 June 2015; 12:00		Boxscore		Kallang Softball Field, Kallang

10 June 2015; 8:30	Indonesia	4 – 0	Singapore	Kallang Softball Field, Kallang
10 June 2015; 8:30		Boxscore		Kallang Softball Field, Kallang

10 June 2015; 14:00	Indonesia	4 – 6	Philippines	Kallang Softball Field, Kallang
10 June 2015; 14:00		Boxscore		Kallang Softball Field, Kallang

==== Final standing ====
Rank	Team
1st place, gold medalist(s)	Philippines
2nd place, silver medalist(s)	Indonesia
3rd place, bronze medalist(s)	Singapore
4	Malaysia
5	Thailand

=== Women's tournament ===
Softball – Women at the 2015 SEA Games
- Dates: 6–10 June 2015
- Competitors: 85 from 5 nations

Medalists
gold medal	Philippines (PHI)
silver medal	Thailand (THA)
bronze medal	Singapore (SIN)

The women competition of the softball event was held from 6–10 June 2015 at the Kallang Softball Field in Kallang, Singapore.

==== Schedule ====
Date	Time	Round
Saturday, 6 June 2015	8:30	Preliminaries
Sunday, 7 June 2015	14:00	Preliminaries
Monday, 8 June 2015	8:30	Preliminaries
Tuesday, 9 June 2015	9:00	Semifinals
Wednesday, 10 June 2015	9:00	Final
Wednesday, 10 June 2015	14:15	Grand final

==== Results – Preliminary Round ====
Source: Preliminary round of results table - Women

Team	Pld	W	L	RF	RA	Pct
Philippines	4	4	0	35	3	1.00
Singapore	4	2	2	26	14	0.50
Thailand	4	2	2	28	29	0.50
Indonesia	4	2	2	26	23	0.50
Malaysia	4	0	4	8	54	0.00

6 June; 8:30	Philippines	6–0	Indonesia	Kallang Softball Field, Kallang

Team	1	2	3	4	5	6	7	R	H	E
Philippines	0	1	0	1	4	0	0	6	0	0
Indonesia	0	0	0	0	0	0	0	0	0	0

6 June; 11:10	Singapore	15–0	Malaysia	Kallang Softball Field, Kallang

Team	1	2	3	R	H	E
Singapore	1	10	4	15	0	0
Malaysia	0	0	0	0	0	0

6 June; 13:45	Thailand	9–10	Indonesia	Kallang Softball Field, Kallang

Team	1	2	3	4	5	6	7	8	9	R	H	E
Thailand	1	0	0	2	1	0	0	1	4	9	0	0
Indonesia	0	0	0	3	0	0	1	1	5	10	0	0

7 June; 14:00	Thailand	2–9	Philippines	Kallang Softball Field, Kallang

Team	1	2	3	4	5	6	R	H	E
Thailand	1	1	0	0	0	0	2	0	0
Philippines	1	1	2	0	4	1	9	0	0

7 June; 16:00	Malaysia	0–15	Indonesia	Kallang Softball Field, Kallang

Team	1	2	3	R	H	E
Malaysia	0	0	0	0	0	0
Indonesia	14	1	x	15	0	0

7 June; 18:15	Singapore	1–8	Philippines	Kallang Softball Field, Kallang

Team	1	2	3	4	5	6	R	H	E
Singapore	0	0	1	0	0	0	1	0	0
Philippines	0	0	1	1	3	3	8	0	0

8 June; 8:30	Thailand	5–2	Singapore	Kallang Softball Field, Kallang

Team	1	2	3	4	5	6	7	R	H	E
Thailand	0	0	0	4	1	0	0	5	0	0
Singapore	0	0	0	0	0	2	0	2	0	0

8 June; 12:30	Philippines	12–0	Malaysia	Kallang Softball Field, Kallang

Team	1	2	3	R	H	E
Philippines	8	0	4	12	0	0
Malaysia	0	0	0	0	0	0

8 June; 15:00	Indonesia	1–8	Singapore	Kallang Softball Field, Kallang

Team	1	2	3	4	5	6	R	H	E
Indonesia	0	0	1	0	0	0	1	0	0
Singapore	2	2	1	1	0	2	8	0	0

8 June; 17:30	Malaysia	8–12	Thailand	Kallang Softball Field, Kallang

Team	1	2	3	4	5	6	7	R	H	E
Malaysia	2	0	0	0	2	4	0	8	0	0
Thailand	1	1	1	2	5	2	x	12	0	0

==== Results – Final round ====
Source: Event Summary

Semifinal; 9 June 9:00
Philippines (PHI)	10
Singapore (SIN)	0
Thailand (THA)	11
Indonesia (INA)	7

Final; 10 June 9:00
Singapore (SIN)	1
Thailand (THA)	2

Grand final 10 June 14:15
Philippines (PHI)	3
Thailand (THA)	0

===== Semifinals =====
9 June; 9:00	Singapore	0–10	Philippines	Kallang Softball Field, Kallang

Team	1	2	3	4	R	H	E
Singapore	0	0	0	0	0	0	0
Philippines	4	4	0	2	10	0	0

9 June; 12:30	Thailand	11–7	Indonesia	Kallang Softball Field, Kallang

Team	1	2	3	4	5	6	7	R	H	E
Thailand	6	0	5	0	0	0	0	11	0	0
Indonesia	3	0	3	0	1	0	0	7	0	0

===== Finals =====
10 June; 9:00	Singapore	1–2	Thailand	Kallang Softball Field, Kallang

Team	1	2	3	4	5	6	7	R	H	E
Singapore	0	0	1	0	0	0	0	1	0	0
Thailand	0	0	0	1	0	0	1	2	0	0

===== Grand finals =====
10 June; 14:15	Thailand	0–3	Philippines	Kallang Softball Field, Kallang

Team	1	2	3	4	5	6	7	R	H	E
Thailand	0	0	0	0	0	0	0	0	0	0
Philippines	0	0	2	1	0	0	x	3	0	0

==== Final standings ====
Rank	Team
1st place, gold medalist(s)	Philippines (PHI)
2nd place, silver medalist(s)	Thailand (THA)
3rd place, bronze medalist(s)	Singapore (SIN)
4	Indonesia (INA)
5	Malaysia (MAS)
