= India men's national softball team =

Information
- Country: India
- Federation: Softball Association of India
- Confederation: Softball Confederation of Asia
- WBSC World Rank: 14th

Men's Softball World Cup
- Appearances: 1 (First in 2017)
- Best result: 15th

Asian Championship
- Appearances: 7 (First in 1985)
- Best result: 4th

European Championship

The India men's national softball team is the national softball team of India in international-level softball competitions.

== Tournament history ==
=== Men's Softball World Championship ===
- 2017 Men's Softball World Championship - 15th

=== Asian Men's Softball Championship ===
- 1985 Asian Men's Softball Championship - participated
- 1998 Asian Men's Softball Championship - participated
- 2003 Asian Men's Softball Championship - participated
- 2012 Asian Men's Softball Championship - participated
- 2018 Asian Men's Softball Championship - participated
- 2022 Asian Men's Softball Championship - 4th
- 2023 Men's Softball Asia Cup - 6th
