= 1990 Asian Men's Softball Championship =

Tournament details
- Host country: Philippines
- Dates: 1990
- Teams: 5
- Defending champions: Japan

Final positions
- Champions: Philippines (3rd title)
- Runner-up: Chinese Taipei
- Third place: Japan
- Fourth place: Indonesia

The 1990 Asian Men's Softball Championship was an international softball tournament which featured five nations which was held in Manila, Philippines.

== Participants ==
- Hong Kong
- Japan
- Indonesia
- Philippines
- Chinese Taipei
