= 1998 Asian Men's Softball Championship =

Tournament details
- Host country: Philippines
- Dates: March 1998
- Teams: 5
- Defending champions: Japan

Final positions
- Champions: Japan (3rd title)
- Runner-up: Philippines
- Third place: Hong Kong
- Fourth place: Malaysia

The 1998 Asian Men's Softball Championship was an international softball tournament which featured seven nations which was held at the Rizal Memorial Baseball Stadium in Manila, Philippines from 14 to 21 March 1998.

The tournament started with a preliminary round played with a double round robin format. The top four teams advanced to a page playoff finals.

== Participants ==
- Hong Kong
- India
- Malaysia
- Japan
- Pakistan (withdrew)
- Philippines

== Final Round ==
Semifinals
Philippines	4
Japan	3
Hong Kong	W
Malaysia	L

Bronze medal game
Japan	13
Hong Kong	1

Gold medal game
Philippines	0
Japan	3
