= Samoa men's national softball team =

Samoa men's national softball team is the national team for Samoa. The team competed at the 2004 ISF Men's World Championship in Christchurch, New Zealand where they finished sixth.
