= Softball at the 2019 SEA Games =

- Venue: Clark International Sports Complex
- Location: Mabalacat, Pampanga, Philippines
- Dates: 2–8 December
- Nations: 5

Softball at the 2019 Southeast Asian Games was held at the Clark International Sports Complex in Mabalacat, Pampanga, the Philippines from 2 to 8 December 2019. Both competitions for men and women were held.

== Competition schedule ==
| P | Preliminaries | ½ | Semifinals | B | Bronze medal match | F | Final |

| Event↓/Date → | Mon 2 | Tue 3 | Wed 4 | Thu 5 | Fri 6 | Sat 7 | Sun 8 |
|---|---|---|---|---|---|---|---|
| Men | P | P | P | | ½ | B | F |
| Women | P | P | P | | ½ | B | F |

== Participating nations ==
Five nations competed in softball at the 2019 Southeast Asian Games:

- Indonesia
- Malaysia
- Philippines
- Singapore
- Thailand

== Medalists ==
| Event | Gold | Silver | Bronze |
|---|---|---|---|
| Men | Singapore | Philippines | Indonesia |
| Women | Philippines | Indonesia | Malaysia |

== Medal table ==
* Host nation (Philippines)

| Rank | Nation | Gold | Silver | Bronze | Total |
|---|---|---|---|---|---|
| 1 | Philippines* | 1 | 1 | 0 | 2 |
| 2 | Singapore | 1 | 0 | 0 | 1 |
| 3 | Indonesia | 0 | 1 | 1 | 2 |
| 4 | Malaysia | 0 | 0 | 1 | 1 |
| Totals (4 entries) | | 2 | 2 | 2 | 6 |
