= Guam men's national softball team =

Guam men's national softball team is the national team for Guam. The 1992 World Championships, the eighth time the event was competed for, was held in Manila. Australia beat Guam 7–2 in one game in the first round robin round.

For the 2008 ISF Men's Regional World Championship Qualifier, the country had to play Australia during the qualifiers. Australia beat Guam 16-0 and 15–0.
