= Philippines men's national softball team =

Philippines national softball team

Information
- Country: Philippines
- Confederation: WBSC Asia
- WBSC World Rank: 18 ▼1 (14 May 2026)

Men's Softball World Cup
- Appearances: 12 (First in 1968)
- Best result: 4th, 1968

Asian Championship
- Appearances: 16 (First in 1968)
- Best result: (gold) 1st (3 times, most recent in 1990)

Southeast Asian Games
- Appearances: 11 (first in 1979)
- Best result: (gold) 1st (9 times, most recent in 2025)

Philippines men's national softball team is the national team for the Philippines.

== History ==
The 1988 World Championships were held in Saskatoon, Canada. The team played 13 games in the round robin round. They finished eighth overall. The team competed at the 1992 ISF Men's World Championship in Manila, Philippines where they finished with 5 wins and 3 losses. The team competed at the 2000 ISF Men's World Championship in East London, South Africa where they finished tenth. The team competed at the 2004 ISF Men's World Championship in Christchurch, New Zealand, where they finished tenth. The team competed at the 2009 ISF Men's World Championship in Saskatoon, Saskatchewan where they finished tenth. They would participate in most of the succeeding editions. However from 2009 to 2022, they maintained a losing streak in the competition until their 8–0 win over Denmark in 2022.

They have won all editions of the Southeast Asian Games were softball has been featured except in the 1997 and 2019 edition where they placed second.

== Competition results ==
=== World Championship ===
World Championship Record
Year	Position
(Mexico) 1966	Did not enter
(United States) 1968	4th place
(Philippines) 1972	5th place
(New Zealand) 1976	Withdrew
(United States) 1980	Did not enter
(United States) 1984	Did not enter
(Canada) 1988	8th place
(Philippines) 1992	7th place
(United States) 1996	Did not enter
(South Africa) 2000	10th place
(New Zealand) 2004	10th place
(Canada) 2009	10th place
(New Zealand) 2010	15th place
(Canada) 2015	14th place
(Canada) 2017	Did not enter
(Czech Republic) 2019	16th place
(New Zealand) 2022	10th place
(Canada) (Mexico) (United States) 2025	18th place
Total	12 appearances

=== Asian Men's Softball Championship ===
Asian Softball Championship Record
Year	Position
(Philippines) 1968	1st place
(Philippines) 1974	1st place
(Japan) 1985	3rd place
(Philippines) 1990	1st place
(Philippines) 1994	2nd place
(Philippines) 1998	2nd place
(Philippines) 2003	2nd place
(Japan) 2006	2nd place
(Japan) 2012	2nd place
(Singapore) 2014	2nd place
(Indonesia) 2018	2nd place
(Japan) 2022	2nd place
(Japan) 2023	3rd place

=== Southeast Asian Games ===
Southeast Asian Games Record
Year	Position
(Indonesia) 1979	1st place
(Philippines) 1981	1st place
(Singapore) 1983	Not Held
(Thailand) 1985	Not Held
(Indonesia) 1987	1st place
(Malaysia) 1989	Not Held
(Philippines) 1991	1st place
(Singapore) 1993	Not Held
(Thailand) 1995	Not Held
(Indonesia) 1997	2nd place
(Brunei) 1999	Not Held
(Malaysia) 2001	Not Held
(Vietnam) 2003	Not Held
(Philippines) 2005	1st place
(Thailand) 2007	1st place
(Laos) 2009	Not Held
(Indonesia) 2011	1st place
(Myanmar) 2013	Not Held
(Singapore) 2015	1st place
(Malaysia) 2017	Not Held
(Philippines) 2019	2nd place
(Cambodia) 2023	Not Held
(Thailand) 2025	1st place
Total	9 gold, 2 silver
