= Thailand men's national softball team =

Men's national softball team representing Thailand

Information
- Country: Thailand
- Federation: Softball Association of Thailand
- Confederation: WBSC Asia
- WBSC World Rank: 27 (31 December 2025)

Asian Championship
- Appearances: 5 (First in 1985)

The Thailand men's national softball team is the national men's softball team of Thailand. It is governed by the Softball Association of Thailand (SBAT), which is listed as Thailand's softball federation by WBSC Asia.

== Background ==
Softball was introduced to Thailand in 1951, according to WBSC Asia's member profile for the Softball Association of Thailand, which notes the sport was introduced by Americans teaching at a Thai physical education teacher training school.

== Competition history ==
=== Southeast Asian Games ===
At the 2025 Southeast Asian Games in Thailand, men's softball was contested. Thailand won the bronze medal, defeating Malaysia 9–2 in five innings in the bronze medal game.

=== U-23 Men's Softball Asia Cup ===
Thailand competed at the 2025 U-23 Men's Softball Asia Cup (Bangkok area, Thailand). The tournament final report lists Thailand as the bronze medalist and records Thailand defeating Malaysia 5–4 in the bronze medal game.

== Results ==
=== Southeast Asian Games ===
Year	Host nation	Position	RF	RA	Notes
2007	Thailand	4th	24	31	—
2015	Singapore	5th	3	17	—
2019	Philippines	4th	0	36	—
2025	Thailand	Bronze (3rd)	16	30	Defeated Malaysia 9–2 in bronze medal game
Overall (4 appearances)			43	114	Best finish: Bronze (2025)

=== U-23 Men's Softball Asia Cup ===
Year	Location	Result	Notes
2025	Thailand (Bangkok/Pathum Thani)	Bronze	Beat Malaysia 5–4 in bronze medal game; final standings list Thailand third.

== See also ==
- Softball Association of Thailand
- Softball at the Southeast Asian Games
