= Chinese Taipei men's national softball team =

Chinese Taipei men's national softball team is the national team for Taiwan (Chinese Taipei). The 1988 World Championships were held in Saskatoon, Canada. The team played 13 games in the round robin round. Australia beat Chinese Taipei 2–0 in one game in this round. The 1992 World Championships, the eighth time the event was competed for, was held in Manila. Australia beat Chinese Taipei 9–2 in one game in the first round robin round. They finished with 4 wins and 4 losses. The team competed at the 1996 ISF Men's World Championship in Midland, Michigan where they finished with 4 wins and 6 losses. The team competed at the 2000 ISF Men's World Championship in East London, Eastern Cape where they finished fifteenth.
