= Singapore men's national softball team =

Singapore men's national softball team is the national team for Singapore.

In the 1992 World Championships, the eighth time the event was competed for, held in Manila. Australia beat Singapore 14–0 in one game in the first round robin round.

In the 2014 Asian Men's Softball Championship, Singapore came in forth.

In the 2015 Southeast Asian Games, Singapore came in third.

In the 2018 Asian Men's Softball Championship, Singapore won Indonesia to clinched the third position. The victory increased the team ranking from 21st to top 16 which qualified the team for 2019 World Baseball Softball Confederation's Men's Softball World Championship, the first time they qualified for the Championships.
