= Hong Kong men's national softball team =

Hong Kong men's national softball team is the national team for Hong Kong. The team competed at the 1992 ISF Men's World Championship in Manila, Philippines where they finished with 1 win and 7 losses. The team competed at the 2004 ISF Men's World Championship in Christchurch, New Zealand where they finished fifteenth.
