= Indonesia men's national softball team =

Indonesia men's national softball team is the national team for Indonesia. The 1992 World Championships, the eighth time the event was competed for, was held in Manila. Australia beat Indonesia 5–4 in one game in the first round robin round. The team competed at the 2009 ISF Men's World Championship in Saskatoon, Saskatchewan where they finished sixteenth.
