= Japan men's national softball team =

Japan national softball team

Information
- Country: Japan
- Federation: Japan Softball Association
- Confederation: WBSC Asia
- WBSC World Rank: 1 (31 December 2025)

Men's Softball World Cup
- Appearances: 16 (First in 1966)
- Best result: (silver) 2nd (2 times, most recent in 2019)

Japan men's national softball team is the national team for Japan. The 1988 World Championships were held in Saskatoon, Canada. The team played 13 games in the round robin round. Japan beat Australia 4–1 in one game in this round. The team competed at the 1992 ISF Men's World Championship in Manila, Philippines where they finished with 7 wins and 2 losses. The team competed at the 1996 ISF Men's World Championship in Midland, Michigan where they finished with 10 wins and 5 losses. The team competed at the 2000 ISF Men's World Championship in East London, South Africa where they finished second. The team competed at the 2004 ISF Men's World Championship in Christchurch, New Zealand, where they finished fifth. The team competed at the 2009 ISF Men's World Championship in Saskatoon, Saskatchewan where they finished sixth.
