= Villasante =

Villasante is a surname. Notable people with the surname include:

- Jesús Villasante
- Jorge Villasante (born 1962), Peruvian politician

== Other uses ==
- Villasante - is an unrecognized micronation in Canlubang, Calamba, Laguna, Philippines.

== See also ==
- Villasanti
