= Cheska Altomonte =

Filipino softball player (born 1992)

Personal information
- Full name: Francesca Altomonte
- National team: Philippines
- Born: June 27, 1992 (age 34)
- Years active: 2013–2019, 2023–

Sport
- Sport: Softball, Slow-pitch softball
- Position: Catcher (softball); Infield (slowpitch)
- University team: Ateneo Lady Batters
Medal record
Women's softball
Representing Philippines
Asian Championship
Silver medal – second place	2017 Taichung	Team
SEA Games
Gold medal – first place	2015 Singapore	Team
Gold medal – first place	2019 Philippines	Team
Co-ed slow-pitch softball
Representing Philippines
Silver medal – second place	2023 Pattaya	Team

Francesca "Cheska" Altomonte (born June 27, 1992) is a Filipina softball player who plays as a catcher of the Philippines women's national softball team.

== Early life and education ==
Cheska Altomonte was born on June 27, 1992, and comes from a family of baseball and softball players. She is the second eldest of among a brood of six. She started with baseball, playing with her brothers at age 10 as a pitcher, shortstop, and a third base. Her sisters are into softball.

She attended the Ateneo de Manila University graduating with a degree in sports organization management in 2013.

== Career ==
Cheska Altomonte played for Ateneo's softball team in the University Athletic Association of the Philippines' (UAAP) Softball Championship. She played for five years with her school and later became co-captain.

Barely 17-years old, Altomonte tried out for the Philippines women's national softball team in 2010 but did not make it. However, she was part of the training pool as early as 2011.

Altomonte eventually start playing for the Philippine national team in 2013. She plays as a catcher with the Philippines and later became team captain. She took a leadership role within the team, helping Filipino Americans integrate with the local-based players.

Altomonte won her first ever SEA Games medal at the 2015 SEA Games in Singapore. At the 2017 Asian Women's Softball Championship in Taichung, the Philippines finished as runners-up.

She competed in other regional, continental and international tournaments. She returned to the Asian Championship in 2019, and 2023, took part at the Women's Softball World Championship in 2016 and 2018, the Asian Games in 2014 and 2018. In both instances of the Asian Games, they placed fourth.

Altomonte decided to retire from the national team after the Philippines won its tenth ever gold medal at the 2019 SEA Games.

Altomonte was convinced to come out of retirement by Ana Maria Santiago, her coach for the 2022 Asian Games and 2023 Women's Softball World Cup (formerly the World Championship). She had a MCL injury in the 2022 Canada Cup which the Philippine national team took part of its preparations.

After recovering, she joined the 2023 Asian Championship in April. She also played for the Philippines co-ed national slow-pitch softball team at the 2023 Co-Ed Slow-Pitch Softball Asia Cup in May. In slow-pitch softball, Altomonte played in the infield position. They finished second.

She rejoined the regular softball Philippine national team for the Group Stage (Group C) of the 2024 Women's Softball World Cup in July 2023. They reached the playoff but was defeated by Italy, preventing their qualification for the finals phase. In October 2023, Altomonte joined the 2022 Asian Games squad, placing fourth again.

== Sports administration ==
In 2020, Altomonte became secretary general of the Amateur Softball Association of the Philippines the following year. She also became part of the Philippine Olympic Committee's Athletes' Commission in the same year.

== Personal life ==
Cheska's brother, Dino is a member of the Philippines national baseball team since 2017. Altomonte worked at Solar Entertainment. She reportedly left a high-paying job at Solar to focus on her national team duties.
