= Ana Santiago =

Filipino softball head coach

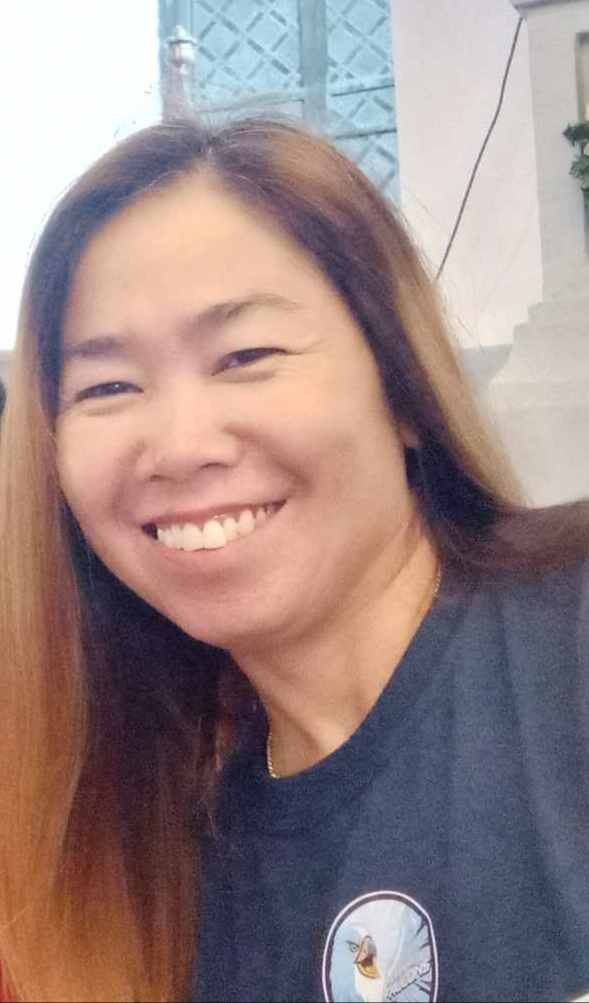

Personal information
- Full name: Ana Maria Santiago
- National team: Philippines
- Height: 152 cm (5 ft 0 in)

Sport
- Sport: Softball, Slow-pitch softball
- Position: Head coach
- University team: Adamson Lady Falcons (1995–2001)

Ana Maria Santiago is a Filipina softball coach for the Adamson Lady Falcons, who won the last 13 UAAP Softball Championships.

== Background ==
=== Playing career ===
Santiago first played for the Adamson Lady Falcons in 1995 and was part of the team that won four straight UAAP titles from 1997 to 2001 under head coach Filomeno Codinera.

She has played for the Philippines women's national softball team and has won at least a gold medal at the SEA Games as a player.

=== Coaching career ===
Santiago and Jenny De Jesus-Cabrera would later become Adamson's assistant coaches.

The Lady Falcons racked up more championships from the time Santiago assumed the head coaching job from Codiñera in 2004. She also coached Team Manila, representing the Asia Pacific district, and won over United States West representative Westchester, California to snatch the biggest of her international crowns, the Big League Softball World Series, held in Kalamazoo, Michigan on August 9, 2012. With that victory, Senate passed a resolution commending Santiago and her team composed of players from Adamson, the University of Santo Tomas, the University of the East, and the Polytechnic University of the Philippines.

Santiago has coached the Philippines women's national softball team in four SEA Games starting from the 2007 edition. She has coached the team at the Women's Softball Asia Cup; first in the 2004 edition.

She coached the Philippines co-ed national slow-pitch softball team to a silver medal finish at the 2023 Co-Ed Slow-Pitch Softball Asia Cup.

== Awards and recognition ==
In Season 80 opening rites, the collegiate league named her one of the "UAAP greats," representing Adamson along with her player Queeny Sabobo and other top athletes from seven other UAAP member schools.

Santiago was inducted into the Adamson Athletes Hall of Fame in 2012. In 2024, Santiago was given a special citation as a softball coach at the PSC-PCW Women in Sports Awards.

== Personal life ==
Ana Santiago is the youngest of six children of Manolito and Shertita Santiago.

== Records ==
=== As coach ===
Adamson Lady Falcons
UAAP Softball Championship

Champions (18): Seasons 66 (2003), 67 (2004), 68 (2005), 69 (2006), 71 (2008), 73 (2010), 74 (2011), 75 (2012), 76 (2013), 77 (2014), 78 (2015), 79 (2016), 80 (2017), 81 (2018), 85 (2023), 86 (2024), 87 (2025), 88 (2026)

Philippines women's national softball team
SEA Games

Champions (4): 2007, 2011, 2015, 2019

Philippines co-ed national slow-pitch softball team
Co-Ed Slow-Pitch Softball Asia Cup

Runners-up (1): 2023
