= Adamson Soaring Falcons, Lady Falcons, Baby Falcons and Lady Baby Falcons =

Varsity teams

- School: Adamson University
- League: UAAP
- Joined: 1952 - probationary member 1953 - probationary membership expired 1970 - rejoined as a probationary member 1971 - admitted as a regular member
- Location: Ermita, Manila, Philippines
- Team colors: Blue White
- Juniors' team: Baby Falcons and Lady Baby Falcons

Seniors' general championships
- UAAP: none

Juniors' general championships
- UAAP: none

The Adamson Soaring Falcons, Lady Falcons, Baby Falcons and Lady Baby Falcons are the collegiate men's and women's, and high school men's and women's, respectively, varsity teams of Adamson University that play in the University Athletic Association of the Philippines.

The university's varsity teams also participate in other sports leagues such as the Filoil Flying V Preseason Cup, Fr. Martin's Cup, University Games, and Premier Volleyball League.

== Team mascot and colors ==
The school's choice of the falcon as its mascot is symbolic. Just as the falcon soars high before inflicting harm on its prey, so do the varsity teams of Adamson soar high to defeat their opponents in a sporting event.

Blue (navy blue) and White are Adamson's official school color.

=== Varsity team monikers ===
Adamson Team Monikers
| Sport | Men's Team | Women's Team | Boys' Team | Girls' Team |
|---|---|---|---|---|
| Basketball | Adamson Soaring Falcons | Adamson Lady Falcons | Adamson Baby Falcons | Adamson Lady Baby Falcons |
| Volleyball | Adamson Soaring Falcons | Adamson Lady Falcons | Adamson Baby Falcons | Adamson Lady Baby Falcons |
| Beach volleyball | Adamson Soaring Falcons | Adamson Lady Falcons | Adamson Baby Falcons | Adamson Lady Baby Falcons |
| Football | Adamson Soaring Falcons | No team | No team | No team |
| Baseball | Adamson Soaring Falcons | No team | No team | No team |
| Softball | No team | Adamson Lady Falcons | No team | No team |
| Judo | No team | No team | No team | No team |
| Taekwondo | No team | No team | No team | No team |
| Fencing | No team | No team | No team | No team |
| Swimming | No team | No team | No team | No team |
| Track and field | Adamson Soaring Falcons | Adamson Lady Falcons | Adamson Baby Falcons | Adamson Lady Baby Falcons |
| Badminton | Adamson Soaring Falcons | Adamson Lady Falcons | Adamson Baby Falcons | Adamson Lady Baby Falcons |
| Tennis | Adamson Soaring Falcons | Adamson Lady Falcons | Adamson Baby Falcons | Adamson Lady Baby Falcons |
| Table tennis | Adamson Soaring Falcons | Adamson Lady Falcons | Adamson Baby Falcons | Adamson Lady Baby Falcons |
| Chess | Adamson Soaring Falcons | Adamson Lady Falcons | Adamson Baby Falcons | Adamson Lady Baby Falcons |
| Cheerleading | Adamson Pep Squad | | | |
| Streetdance | Adamson CAST | | Adamson Cauldron Dance Company | |

== Team sports ==
=== Beach volleyball ===
The school has men's and women's beach volleyball teams.

=== Football ===
Adamson has field a men's football team since Season 77 in 2014. The Soaring Falcons reached their first Final Four appearance in Season 89 in 2026.

=== Softball ===
Adamson has a women's softball team which as of October 2024, have won eleven consecutive UAAP seasons. The team has been invited to represent the Philippines in the 2024 Asian Universities Women's Softball Asia Cup.

==== Notable players ====
- Ana Santiago
- Queeny Sabobo

=== Volleyball ===
==== Notable athletes ====
- Angela Benting
- Mylene Paat
- Tatan Pantone
- Bang Pineda
- Pau Soriano
- Jema Galanza
- Trisha Genesis

== Cheering Squad ==
The Adamson Pep Squad is the official cheering squad of the university's athletic program. They are known for their energetic and spirited performances, which have helped them win numerous awards in the UAAP Cheerdance Competition.

== Rankings ==
This is the school's ranking in the team sports in UAAP since 1986, the year the UAAP became an eight member-school league.

| UAAP Season | Basketball | | Volleyball | | Baseball | Softball |
| UAAP Season | M | W | M | W | M | W |
|---|---|---|---|---|---|---|
| 49 (1986–87) | | | | | 1st | |
| 50 (1987–88) | 4th | | | 5th | 1st | |
| 51 (1988–89) | 4th | | | 6th | - | |
| 52 (1989–90) | 6th | | | 7th | 1st | 1st |
| 53 (1990–91) | 6th | | | 7th | - | |
| 54 (1991–92) | 4th | | | 5th | 1st | - |
| 55 (1992–93) | 2nd | | | 4th | 1st | - |
| 56 (1993–94) | 2nd | | | 3rd | 1st | - |
| 57 (1994–95) | Suspended | | | | | |
| 58 (1995–96) | 6th | | | 8th | - | - |
| 59 (1996–97) | 7th | 5th | 6th | 7th | 5th | - |
| 60 (1997–98) | 7th | | | 6th | 1st | 1st |
| 61 (1998–99) | 7th | 4th | 5th | 5th | 1st | 1st |
| 62 (1999–00) | 5th | | | 3rd | - | 1st |
| 63 (2000–01) | 8th | | | 3rd | - | 1st |
| 64 (2001–02) | 8th | | | 8th | - | - |
| 65 (2002–03) | 7th | | | 8th | - | - |
| 66 (2003–04) | 4th | | | 7th | - | 1st |
| 67 (2004–05) | 5th | | | 5th | - | 1st |
| 68 (2005–06) | 6th | 2nd | 4th | 2nd | 5th | 1st |

| UAAP Season | Basketball | | Volleyball | | Football | Baseball | Softball |
| UAAP Season | M | W | M | W | M | M | W |
|---|---|---|---|---|---|---|---|
| 69 (2006–07) | 4th | 5th | 6th | 3rd | – | 2nd | 1st |
| 70 (2007–08) | 7th | 4th | 3rd | 2nd | – | 1st | 2nd |
| 71 (2008–09) | 7th | 4th | 5th | 4th | – | 1st | 1st |
| 72 (2009–10) | 5th | 1st | 8th | 4th | – | 1st | 2nd |
| 73 (2010–11) | 3rd | 1st | 5th | 3rd | – | 3rd | 1st |
| 74 (2011–12) | 3rd | 2nd | 3rd | 5th | – | 5th | 1st |
| 75 (2012–13) | 6th | 3rd | 4th | 3rd | – | 6th | 1st |
| 76 (2013–14) | 7th | 4th | 4th | 4th | – | 6th | 1st |
| 77 (2014–15) | 8th | 6th | 4th | 7th | 8th | 6th | 1st |
| 78 (2015–16) | 8th | 6th | 3rd | 7th | 7th | 4th | 1st |
| 79 (2016–17) | 4th | 4th | 5th | 8th | 8th | 4th | 1st |
| 80 (2017–18) | 3rd | 5th | 5th | 5th | 8th | 1st | 1st |
| 81 (2018–19) | 3rd | 4th | 8th | 8th | 6th | 4th | 1st |
| 82 (2019–20) | 6th | 4th | C | C | C | C | C |
| 83 (2020–21) | Cancelled due to the COVID-19 pandemic | | | | | | |
| 84 (2021–22) | 5th | NT | NT | 5th | NT | NT | NT |
| 85 (2022–23) | 4th | 5th | | | | | 1st |

Note: 1. The rankings from 2003 to 2005 consider the forfeited games of DLSU. UAAP Season 68 suspension of De La Salle University-Manila. 2. NT: No Tournament held due to pandemic. 3. C: Cancelled due to pandemic.

== Number of championships ==
The following table shows the number of championships of Adamson University in the University Athletic Association of the Philippines (UAAP).

UAAP Championships
| Sport | Men's Team | Women's Team | Boys' Team | Girls' Team |
|---|---|---|---|---|
| Basketball | 1 | 6 | 8 | —N/a |
| Volleyball | 3 | 0 | 0 | 1 |
| Beach volleyball | 0 | 3 | 0 | '0' |
| Football | 0 | 0 | 0 | —N/a |
| Baseball | 12 | —N/a | 0 | —N/a |
| Softball | —N/a | 19 | —N/a | —N/a |
| Judo | 0 | 0 | 0 | 0 |
| Taekwondo | 0 | 0 | 0 | 0 |
| Fencing | 0 | 0 | 0 | 0 |
| Swimming | 0 | 0 | 0 | 0 |
| Track and field | 3 | 2 | 1 | 0 |
| Badminton | 0 | 0 | 0 | 0 |
| Tennis | 6 | 0 | 0 | 0 |
| Table tennis | 1 | 0 | 1 | 0 |
| Chess | 4 | 0 | 3 | 0 |
| Cheerleading | 1 | | | |
| Streetdance | 0 | | | |
| Total | 30 | 30 | 15 | 1 |
