= Canlubang Sugar Barons =

Baseball team in Calamba, Laguna, Philippines

Information
- League: Manila Bay Baseball League
- Location: Bo. Canlubang, Barangay Canlubang, Calamba, Laguna, Philippines
- Ballpark: Canlubang Stadium
- Founded: c. 1920s
- Folded: 1979
- Nickname(s): Sugar Barons
- League championships: at least 7
- Former name(s): Nan’yō Kōhatsu (c. 1940s)
- Ownership: Canlubang Sugar Estate

The Canlubang Sugar Barons were a baseball team that played in the now defunct Manila Bay Baseball League. They were the baseball team of the Canlubang Sugar Estate which is also now defunct.

The baseball team was organized by the Yulo family of Canlubang, Laguna who were involved in the sugar industry. During the World War II, when the Japanese occupiers of the Philippines established a baseball league in Manila, the Canlubang Sugar Barons competed under the name "Nan'yō Kōhatsu". The Sugar Barons dominated the Manila Bay Baseball League winning at least seven straight titles under manager, Rodolfo Tingzon. and had their home field in Laguna is the only regulation baseball field in the country at that time other than the Rizal Memorial Baseball Stadium.

The team which existed for more than 50 years became defunct when the Manila Bay Baseball League folded in 1979. The Canlubang Sugar Barons also suffered from a significant rise of sugar prices in the world market. Among the team's notable players is national team player, Filomeno Codiñera.
