= Adamson Lady Falcons softball =

- Founded: 1994
- University: Adamson University
- Head coach: Ana Santiago
- Location: Manila, Philippines

The Adamson Lady Falcons has a women's softball team which represents the Adamson University in the University Athletic Association of the Philippines.

== History ==
=== Early years ===
The Adamson Lady Falcons have long fielded a women's team in the University Athletic Association of the Philippines (UAAP) Softball Championship. They were among the teams that played in early 1994, when the sport was revived after an eight year hiatus. Softball was then initially hosted as a demonstration sport.

They then fielded a team in the following season in 1995 under coach Filomeno Codiñera. From that season, softball is a regular sport. The University of the Philippines (UP) Lady Maroons have won the first three editions with the last of these being in 1997. Adamson went on to win fourth straight titles from Season 60 to 63 (1997–2001).

=== 2000s ===
Ana Santiago became the head coach of Adamson's softball team in 2004 taking over from Codiñera. Santiago is attributed to the schools' championship streak later on. The team won four consecutive titles from Seasons 66 to 69 (2004–2007). UP broke the title streak in Season 70 in 2008. Adamson won Season 71 in 2009.

=== 2010s–present ===
The University of Santo Tomas' (UST) Tiger Softballes defeated Adamson in Season 72 in 2010. However this was followed by a start of a dynasty for the Lady Falcons starting Season 73.

In Season 78 in 2016, UST forced a Final Four format by defeating Adamson in their last elimination round game and also ended the Lady Falcons' 73-game win streak.

By Season 88 in 2026, Adamson has won its thirteen straight softball titles with the latest being won in . They surpassed the Far Eastern University in the overall softball title count with the Season 88 trophy being their 21st.

== Record ==
UAAP Season	Results	Ref.
57 (1994–95)	Results not known (Exhibition)	
58 (1995–96)	Results not known	
59 (1996–97)	Results not known	
60 (1997–98)	Champions	
61 (1998–99)	Champions	
62 (1999–00)	Champions	
63 (2000–01)	Champions	
64 (2001–02)	Results not known	
65 (2002–03)	Results not known	
66 (2003–04)	Champions	
67 (2004–05)	Champions	
68 (2005–06)	Champions	
69 (2006–07)	Champions	
70 (2007–08)	Runners-up	
71 (2008–09)	Champions	
72 (2009–10)	Runners-up	
73 (2010–11)	Champions	
74 (2011–12)	Champions	
75 (2012–13)	Champions	
76 (2013–14)	Champions	
77 (2014–15)	Champions	
78 (2015–16)	Champions	
79 (2016–17)	Champions	
80 (2017–18)	Champions	
81 (2018–19)	Champions	
82 (2019–20)	Cancelled due to COVID-19 pandemic	
83 (2020–21)	Cancelled due to COVID-19 pandemic	
84 (2021–22)	Not played	
85 (2022–23)	Champions	
86 (2023–24)	Champions	
87 (2024–25)	Champions	
88 (2025–26)	Champions	

== Head coaches ==
- Filomeno Codiñera (1990s–2004)
- Ana Santiago (2004–present)
