= Philippines co-ed national slow-pitch softball team =

Philippines

Information
- Country: Philippines
- Federation: Amateur Softball Association of the Philippines
- Confederation: WBSC Asia
- Manager: Ana Santiago

The Philippines co-ed national slow-pitch softball team, is the mixed-gender national team of Philippines in slow-pitch softball. They are governed by the Amateur Softball Association of the Philippines.

== History ==
The Philippines took part in the inaugural 2023 Co-Ed Slow-Pitch Softball Asia Cup in Pattaya, Thailand. The team was coached by Ana Santiago. The Philippines advanced to the final, which they lost to Chinese Taipei. As among the top three finishing teams, the national team qualified for the 2023 WBSC Coed Slow Pitch Softball World Cup.

The World Cup was to be hosted in Guadalajara, Mexico in December 2023, The Philippines however withdrew from participation conceding its berth to fourth placers, Thailand. The international tournament itself was eventually cancelled in October 2023 due to logistical challenges.

== Roster (2023) ==
National squad for the 2023 Co-Ed Slow-Pitch Softball Asia Cup.

Head Coach: Ana Santiago

No.	Name	Gender	Position
7	Tomas Pablo Emmanuel Panlilio	M	Outfield
8	Cheska Altomonte	F	Infield
9	Dino Altomonte	M	Infield
10	Khrisha Genuary Cantor	F	Outfield
11	Madeleine Lhuillier	F	Infield
12	Maria Charlotte Narces Salas	F	3rd base
15	Isidro Abello	M	Pitcher, Infield
17	Elsie Dela Torre	F	1st base
24	Benjamin Cope	M	Infield, Outfield
27	Jenette Rusia	F	Outfield
29	Anthony Olaez	M	Pitcher, Infield, Outfield
30	Dennis Joseph Nelson	M	Pitcher, Outfield, 1st base
33	Michael Pagkaliwagan	M	3rd base
41	Cristy Joy Roa	F	Outfield
46	Mary Joy Maguad	F	2nd base
53	Julius Cesar Visaya	M	Pitcher, Outfield
55	Maria Angelu Gabriel	F	Infield, Outfield
73	Jerome Bacarisas	M	Shortstop

== Competition results ==
=== World Cup ===
World Cup Record
Year	Position
(Mexico) 2023	Cancelled

=== Asia Cup ===
Asia Cup Record
Year	Position
(Thailand) 2023	2nd place
