= Rizal Institute =

- formerly Rizal Institute Don Bosco; Rizal Institute - Canlubang
- A Rizal Institute in Canlubang

Location
- Canlubang; Calabarzon; Philippines, Laguna
- Coordinates: 14.214607°N 121.114424°E

Information
- School type: Secondary Private, Non-Sectarian
- Motto: Excellence. Integrity. Spirituality
- Founded: 1949
- Founder: Don José Yulo
- Staff: 5
- Faculty: 12
- Classes: 8
- Average class size: 30
- Education system: K-12 Basic Education Curriculum
- Language: English, Filipino
- Hours in school day: 8
- Classrooms: 15
- Student Union/Association: RI Student Council
- Color: Green
- Song: RI Alma Mater Hymn
- Nickname: RI
- Publication: The Rizalian Pioneer
- Affiliation: Calamba City Private Schools Administrator's Association (CACPRISAA)

Rizal Institute (also known as R.I.) is a secondary non-sectarian private school in Canlubang. Founded by Hon. Jose H. Yulo Sr. in 1949, the school was formerly known as Rizal Institute Don Bosco or RIDB. The first director of the school was Ms. Constancio Gabriel with Ms. Josefa M. Tobias as the first principal. In 1960, through the efforts of Fr. Gualberto La Torre, the school administration changed hands to the Salesians and became the Rizal Institute Don Bosco Canlubang. The first director from the Salesians was Fr. Jolus Buchta. In 2003, after 43 years under the Salesians, the school administration was handed over to an alumnus, Mr. James Robert H. de Guia, a graduate of De La Salle University.

== History ==
Mr. Yulo conceived the idea of opening a school where students could study at minimum cost (they are still charged only half of the tuition fees) and at the same time be afforded adequate school facilities.

On June 28, 1949, the first applicants for teaching were interviewed by the newly appointed director, Mr. Constancio P. Gabriel. Three days after, on July 1, the institute was created with an enrolment of 161 students for first and second years. After a week's period of class at the baseball stadium, classes were transferred to the then unfinished building.

Upon completion of the then seven-room building, the school was formally blessed and inaugurated on November 30, 1949, with ceremonies officiated by Fr. Cirilio Castillo, parish priest of the Canlubang Sugar Estate and St. Joseph Chapel, and Mr. Jose Yulo as the principal speaker.
