= Canlubang =

- Barangay
- Barangay Canlubang
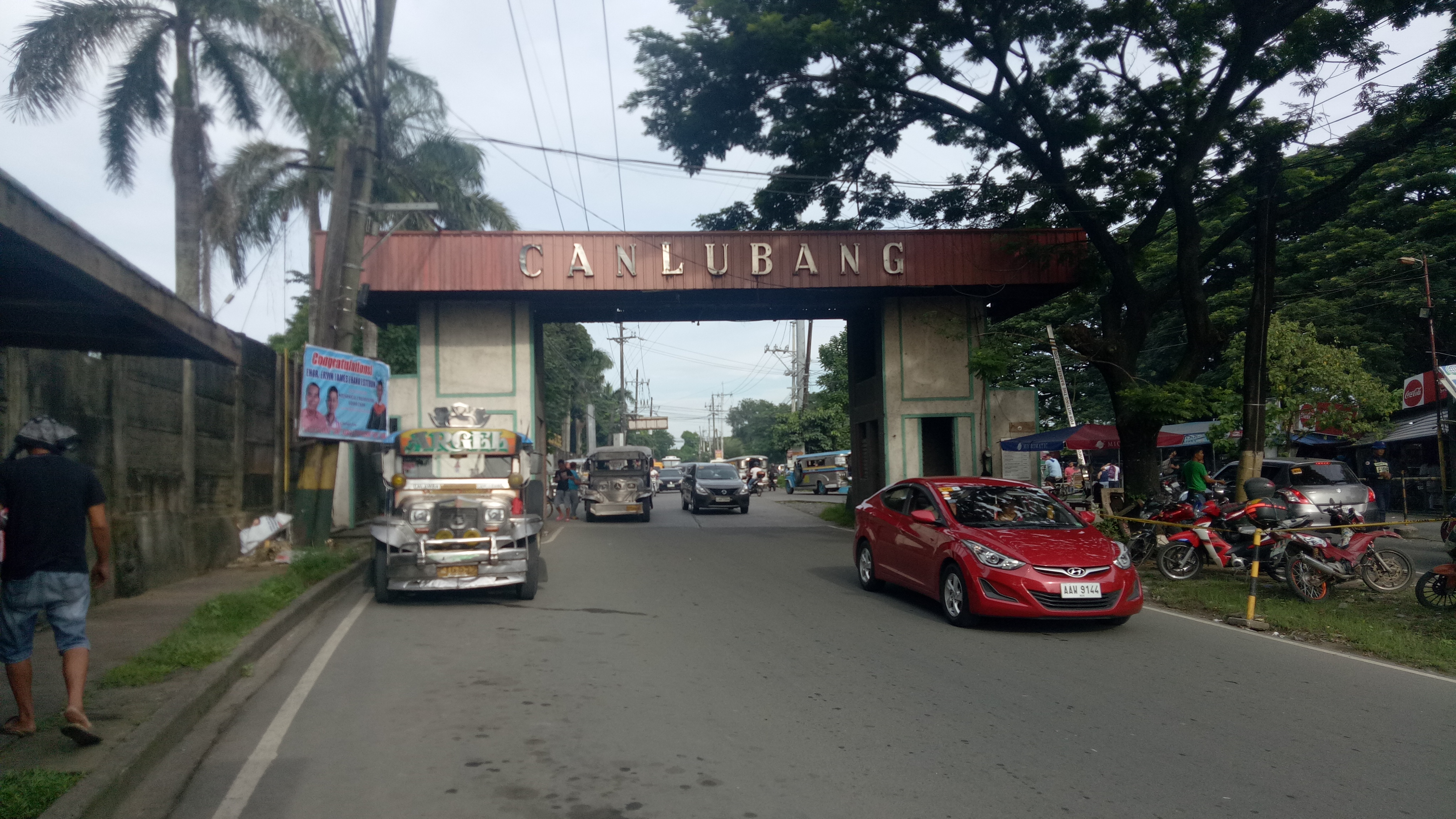
- A Canlubang Arch

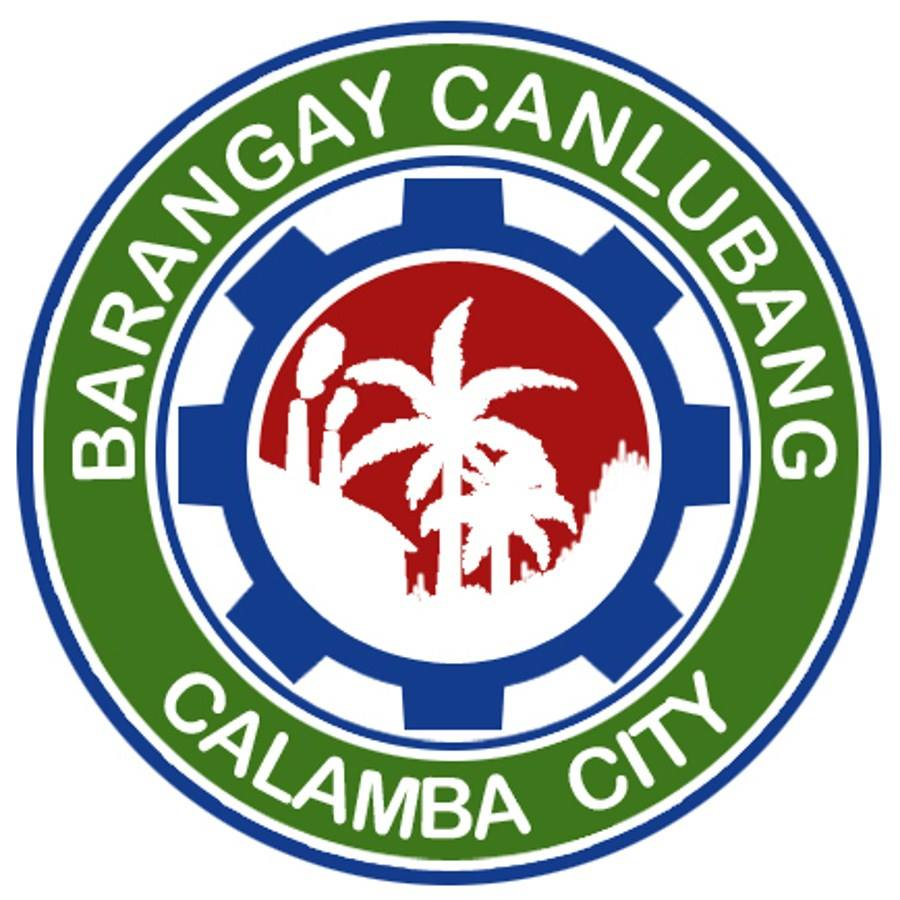
- Seal
- Interactive map of Canlubang
- Coordinates: 14°11′31″N 121°4′16″E
- Country: Philippines
- Islands: Luzon
- Region: Calabarzon (Region IV-A)
- Province: Laguna
- City: Calamba
- Seat of government: MCDC (de jure); Ceris (de facto)
- Largest district: Carmel District

Government
  - Barangay Chairman: Larry O. Dimayuga (pending)
  - OIC chairman & Councilors: Edgar Mangubat (OIC chairman); Catherine Palentinos; Eric O. Manaig; Hector Fajardo

Area
  - Land: 39.12 km^{2} (15.10 sq mi)

Population (2024)
  - Total: 68,780
  - Density: 1,758/km^{2} (4,554/sq mi)
- ZIP code: 4028
- Patron saint: St. Joseph the Worker

Canlubang is a major industrial zone located in the province of Laguna, Philippines. It was once a hacienda during the Spanish colonial period. Canlubang straddles two component cities of Laguna: Cabuyao, Calamba, the municipality of Silang in Cavite, and the city of Tagaytay.

The official political unit with the name Canlubang is a barangay in Calamba, Laguna. It is the largest and most populated barangay in Calamba and the second most populated in Laguna.

Canlubang covers major industrial zones. The Nuvali development of Ayala Land could be found in the barangay and extends to as far as Cabuyao and Santa Rosa, Laguna.

MCDC is the seat government of brgy. Canlubang after Ceris since 2017.

== History ==
The history of Canlubang can be traced back to the 16th century. It was originally owned by a group of sangleys residing in Calamba. It was confiscated by the government and sold at a public auction to a peninsular Spaniard, Don Tomas de Andaya in 1678. It was then acquired by the Jesuits in 1759. When the Jesuits were expelled from the Philippines, the land was again confiscated by the government and sold again at a public auction to Don Jose Clemente de Azanza in 1802. It was acquired by the Dominicans in 1830.

=== Canlubang Sugar Estate ===
When the Americans colonized the country, the land was classified as friar land and was again acquired by the government in 1905. Alfred Ehrman, leader of a group of American businessmen from California, organized and incorporated the Calamba Sugar Estate in 1912 which purchased the friar land. The Calamba Sugar Estate, managed by Louis Weinzheimer and his family, is known as the second sugar central in the Philippines. The sugar mill started its operations on December 1, 1914. It also planted coconuts on its property and was a model sugar plantation from 1920 to 1930s.

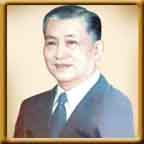
José Yulo offered the estate of Canlubang

The Americans sold the estate to Vicente Madrigal on the onset of the Japanese occupation of the Philippines. In 1948, Madrigal was unable to run the estate successfully due to labor unrest. He offered the estate to a good friend, José Yulo, a bright lawyer and legal counsel of the estate since 1927 who had served as Speaker of the House of Representatives before World War II and Chief Justice of the Supreme Court during the Japanese Occupation. The Yulos improved its financial and social status within two years through progressive reforms. His wife, Doña Cecilia Araneta Yulo of Iloilo, was instrumental in the construction of a school (now Rizal Institute), the church of St. Joseph, civic and recreational centers, and the first outdoor drive-in cinema. Sports facilities such as a baseball field, swimming pools, tennis courts, bowling lanes, and a golf course were also built. The company was also expanded into a pulp facility known as Canlubang Pulp which purchased more than 80% of the total abaca produced in the country.

During the 1970s, less land was available for sugarcane since planters sold their land to developers or converted them into subdivisions. Profit of the mill was decreasing. The Yulo family realized a need for a comprehensive master plan for the estate. They sought the assistance of National Artist for Architecture Leandro V. Locsin, married to Cecilia Yulo-Locsin, and the Canlubang Urban Project was born. Locsin designed Canlubang as a pioneer sustainable satellite city to attract investors in Laguna. In 1972, the first integrated industrial park was built outside Metro Manila. Canlubang became the catalyst of what is now known as Project CALABARZON.

== Geography ==
Canlubang is bordered by Cabuyao to the north, the barangays of Mapagong, Mayapa, Sirang Lupa and Majada Out of Calamba to the east, by the barangays of Laguerta, Hornalan and Bunggo of Calamba to the south and by Silang, province of Cavite to the west.

Canlubang has a total land area of 3,912 hectares (9,666.8 acres) making it the largest barangay in Calamba in terms of land area and one of the largest in the country. Half of its land (or 50%) is undeveloped agricultural land, 20% is residential, 20% is industrial and 10% is commercial. It is classified as a rural area and land use falls under the Growth Management Zone 1 & 2. Two industrial parks are currently situated in Canlubang. These are the Silangan Industrial Park and the Carmelray Industrial Park 1 which uses 200 and 202 hectares of land respectively.

=== Districts ===
- ‡ Urban
- ± Independent
- † Center
- ∗ Component

Districts	Sitios *	Status	Capital
Canlubang (Proper)	Casmicejos; *Happy Valley; Locomotive; Old Stable (Baryo) Paltok	Urban and Rural	Baryo Paltok
*Carmel District	GK Village & GK Majada	Rural	Carmel District
Ceris Village	*Ceris I Ceris II; Ceris III	Rural at Urban	Ceris III
Kapayapaan Village	Asia-1; Asia-2; Carmel Housing; Manfil (including Villasante); *MCDC; Palao	Urban	Manfil
Silangan Village	*Kapatagan B-1	Urban	Silangan
Upland Canlubang	Balagbag Araw; *Buntog; Majada-In; Mangumit I Mangumit II; Putol	Rural	Buntog

== Demographics ==
Population census of Brgy. Canlubang
Year	Pop.	±% p.a.
1980	18,659	—
1990	20,112	+0.75%
1995	34,484	+10.63%
2000	45,294	+6.02%
2007	54,602	+2.61%
2010	54,655	+0.04%
2015	54,557	−0.03%
2020	60,292	+2.13%
2024	68,780	+3.21%

According to the 2010 census, Barangay Canlubang has a population of 54,655 inhabitants, making it the most populated barangay in Calamba.

=== Religion ===
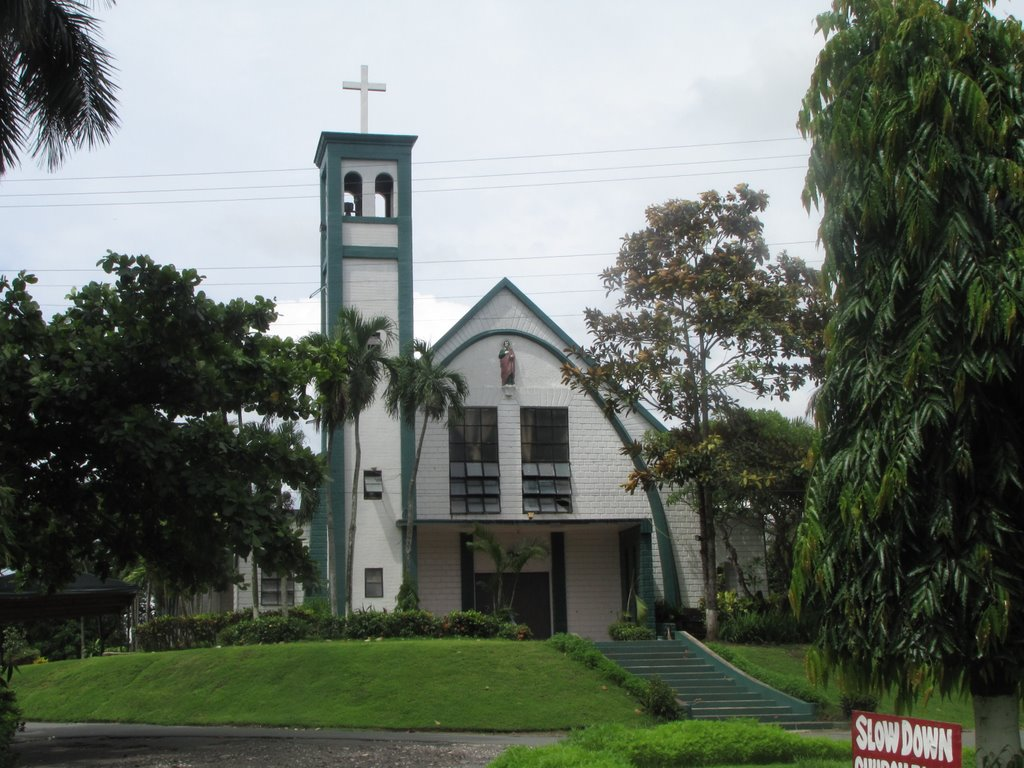
A St. Joseph Parish Church Canlubang

Canlubang is predominantly Catholic. Other religious sects in the community are Protestantism, Iglesia ni Cristo and Islam.

It is the only barangay in the province of Laguna under the Diocese of San Pablo that hosts a patron saint for itself, St. Joseph the Worker, whose feast is celebrated every May 1.

== Economy ==
The income of Canlubang mainly comes from manufacturing and economic plants located within industrial parks.

=== Industries and Manufacturing ===
As a premier industrial hub outside Manila, several industrial parks are located in the barangay. These include Carmelray Industrial Park I, Carmelray International Business Park, NYK-TDG IT Park and Silangan Industrial Park.

=== Commerce and Trades ===
Several shopping centers and commercial establishments can also be found within Canlubang. These include Carmel Mall, (dubbed the Canlubang Community Shopping Center) and iMall Canlubang.

== Notable people ==
- Florencio Pesquesa– farm worker and labor leader during the Martial law era that was abducted and disappeared. His name is inscribed in the Bantayog ng mga Bayani
- Jerrold Tarog – film director and screenwriter
- José Yulo
- Vicente Madrigal

== Gallery ==
Upland area

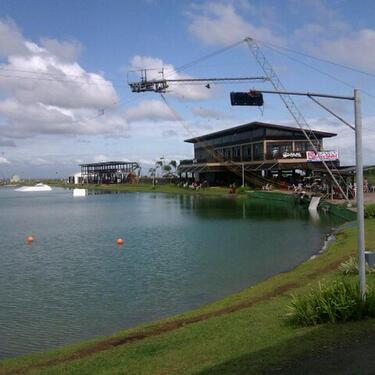
A Republ1c Wakepark sa Canlubang

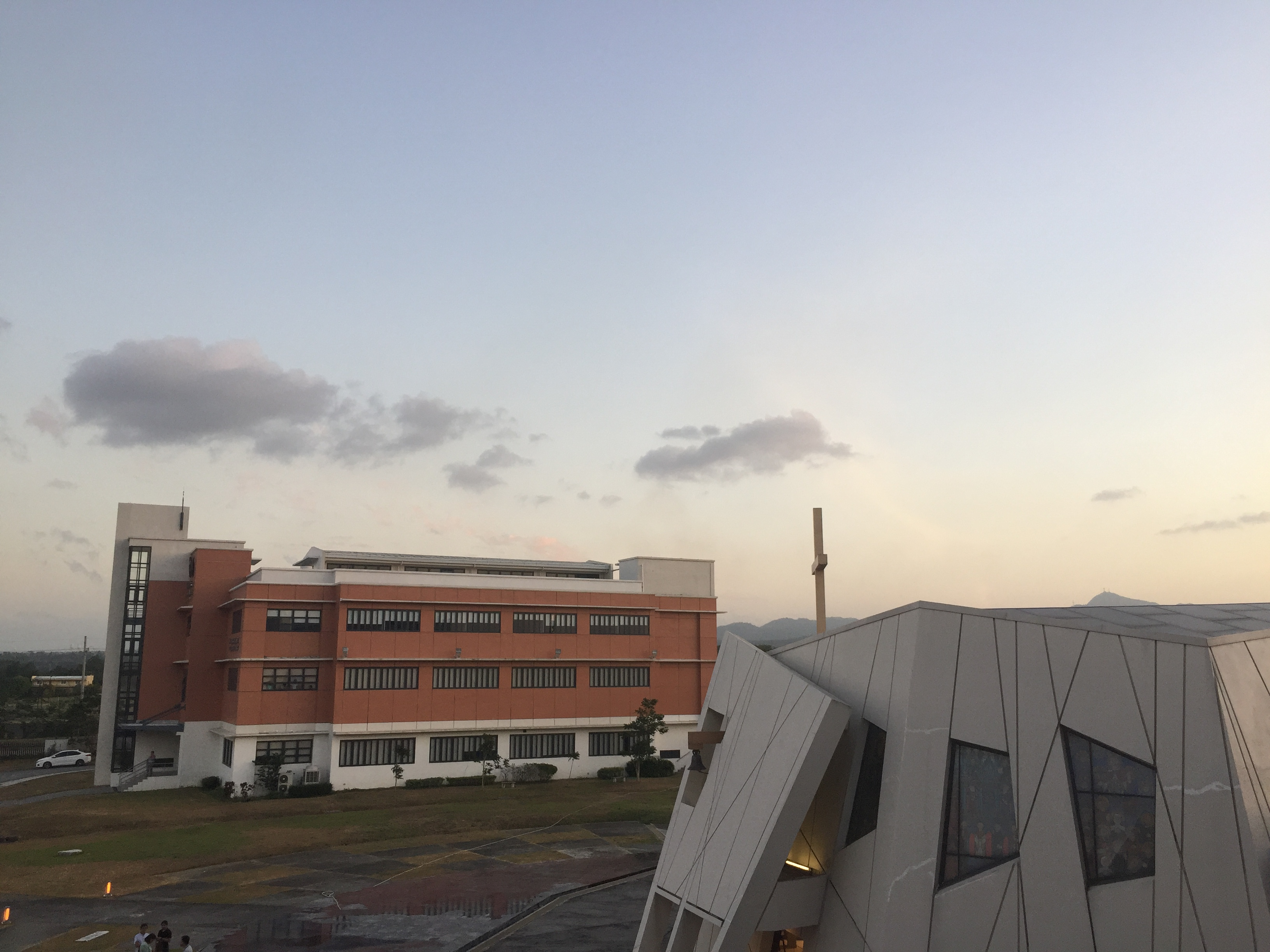
A Xavier School Nuvali sa Mangumit Vesta Plains

Kapayapaan area

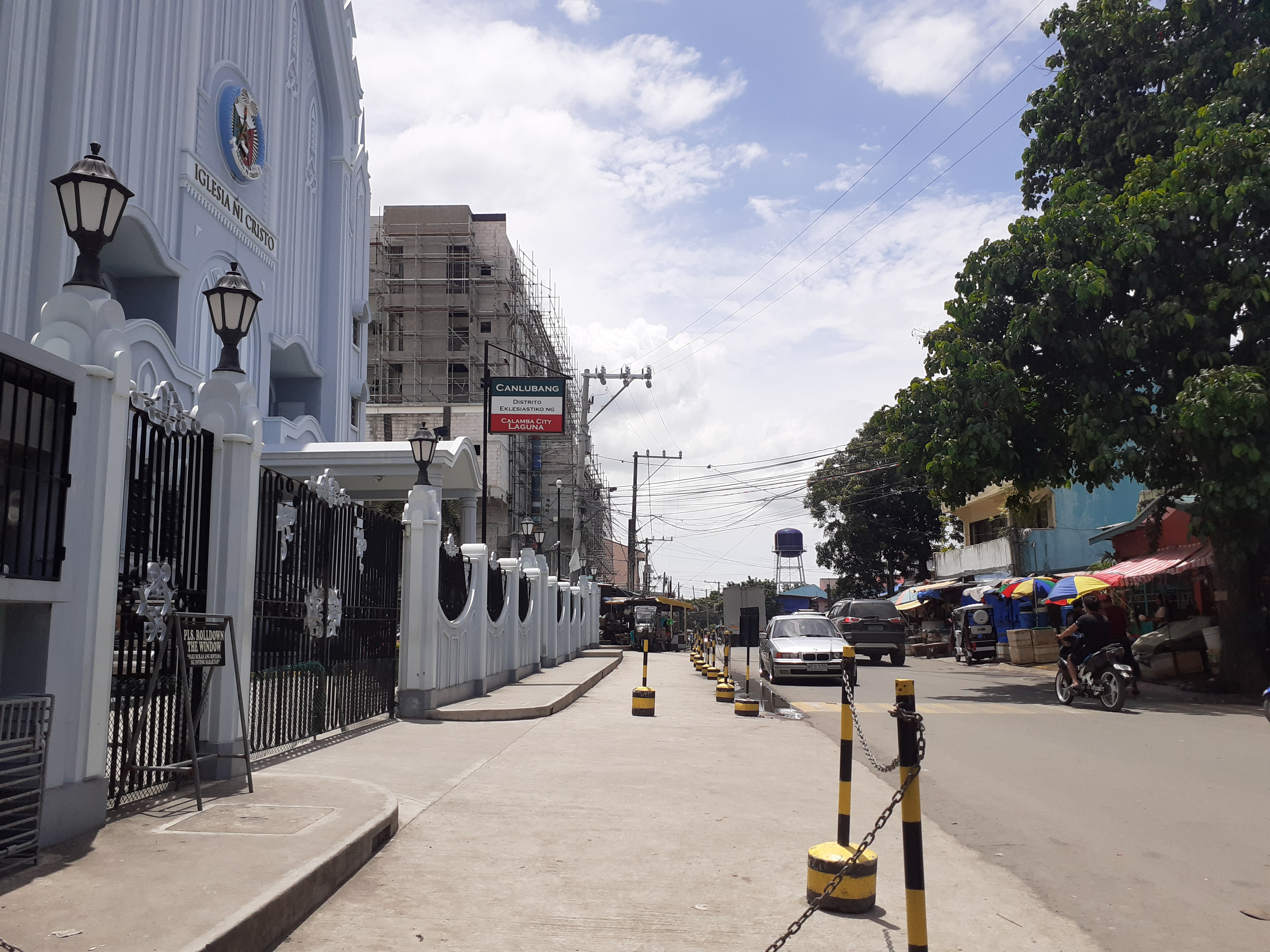
Asia-1

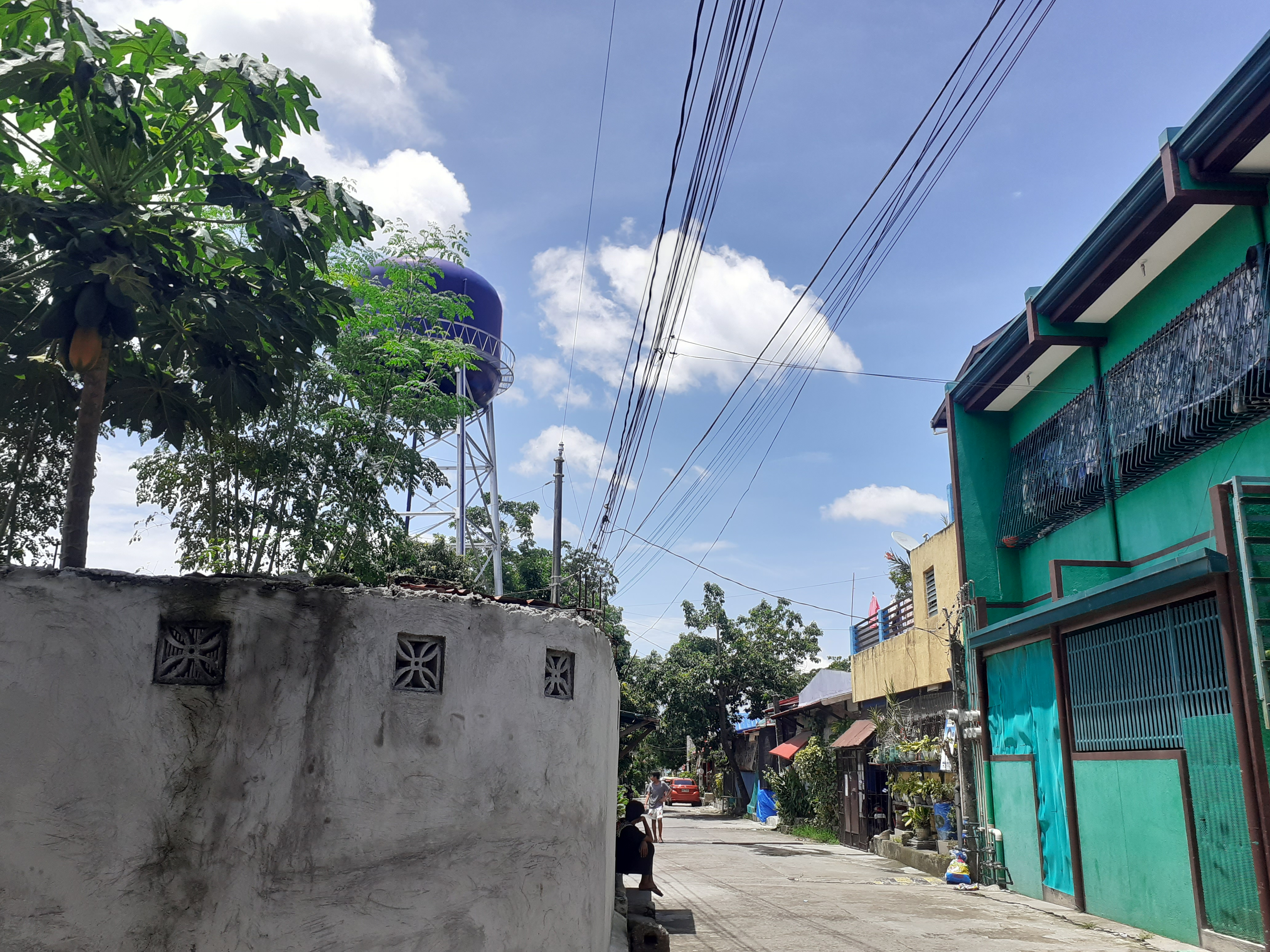
Asia-2

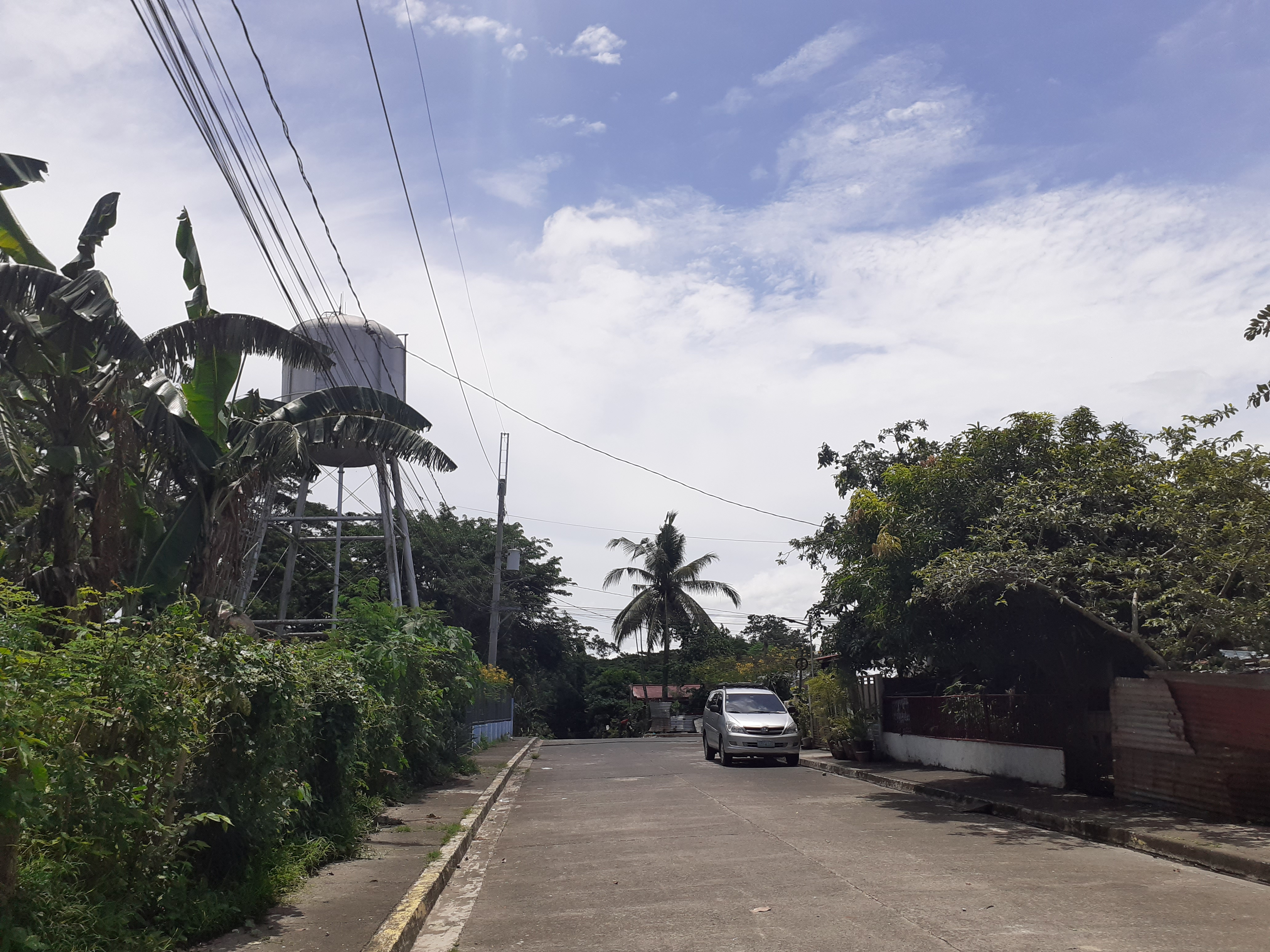
Carmel

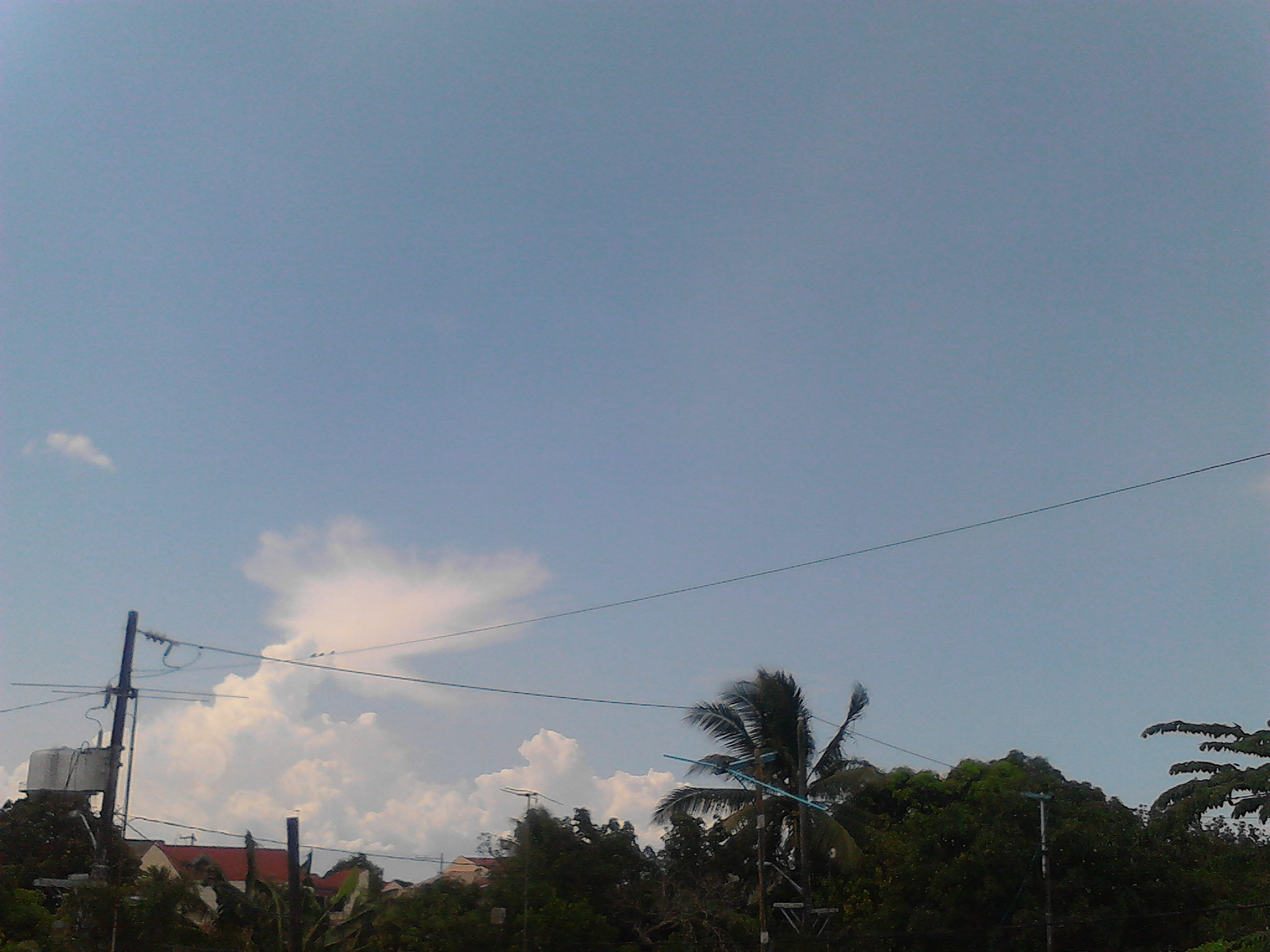
Manfil

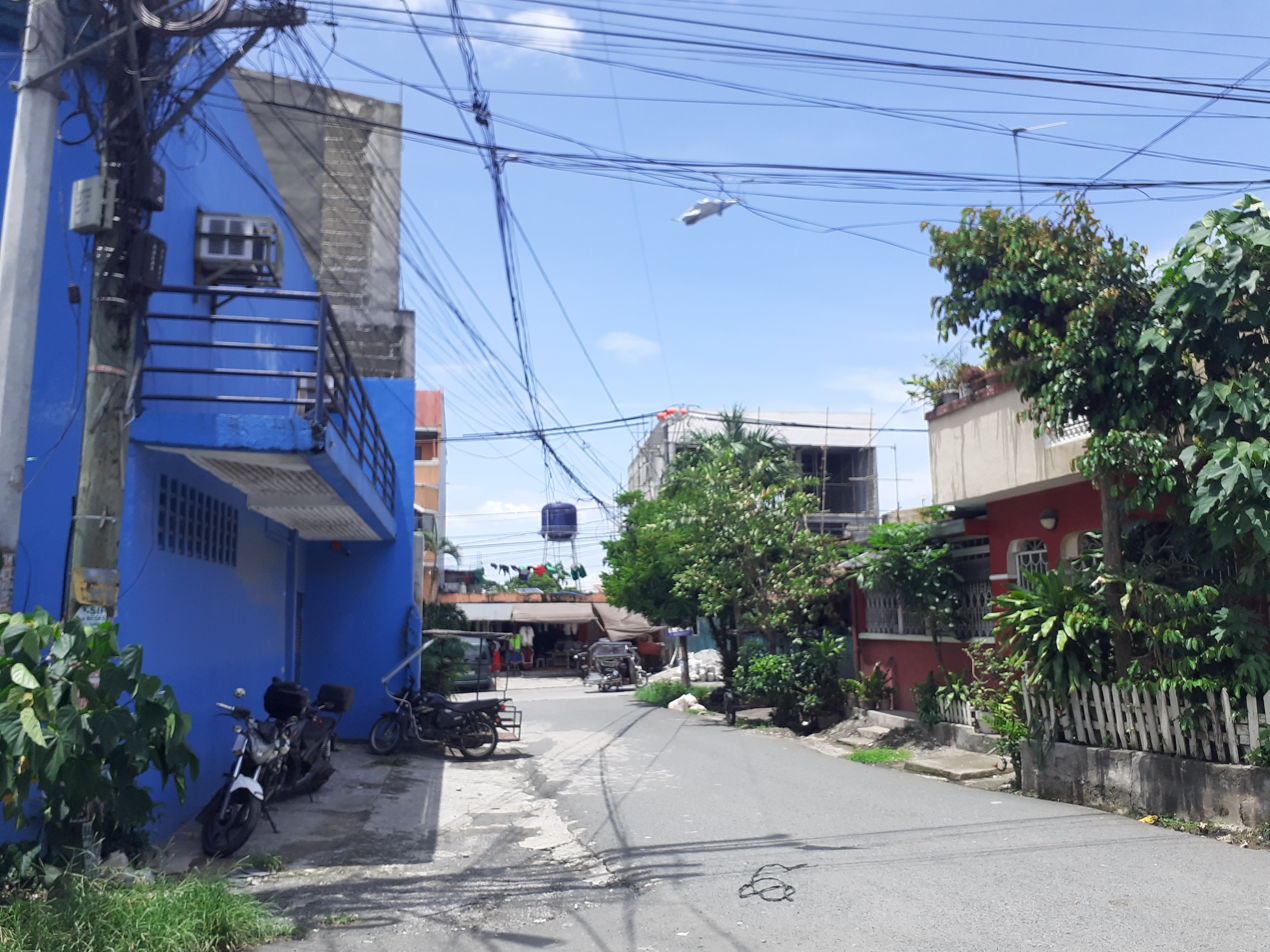
MCDC

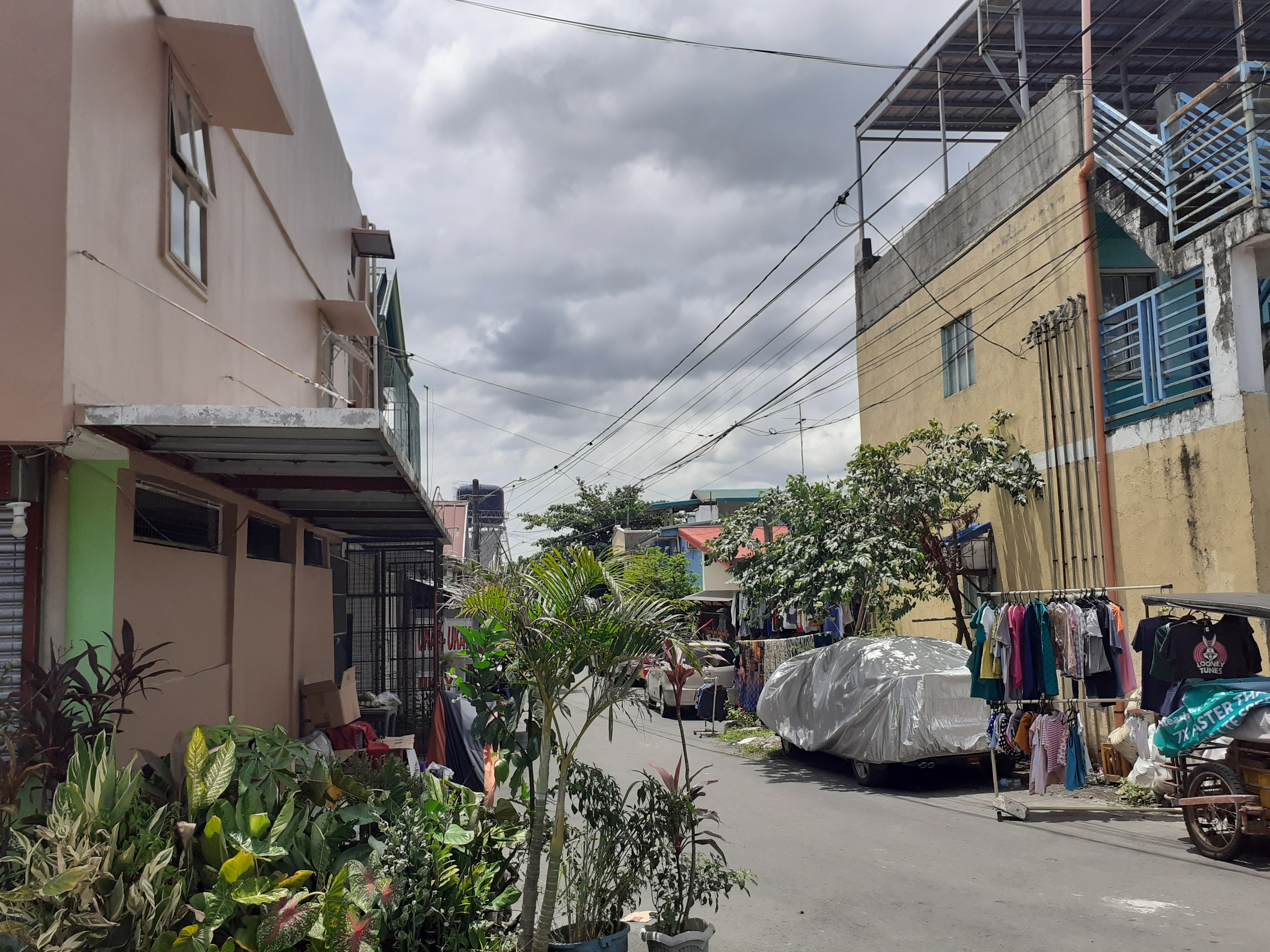
Palao

Proper area

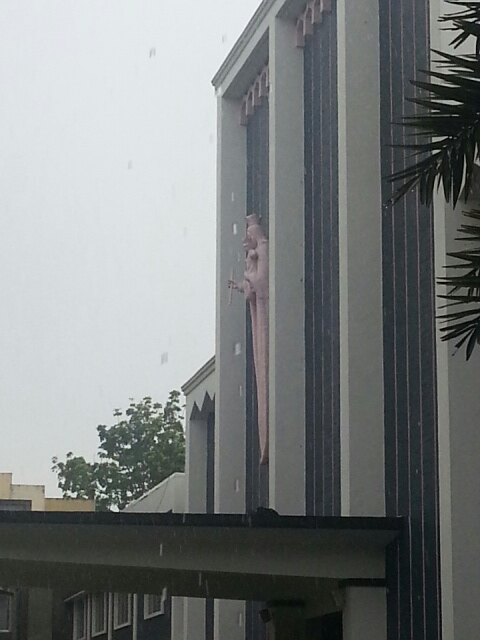
A Mary Help of Christians in Canlubang

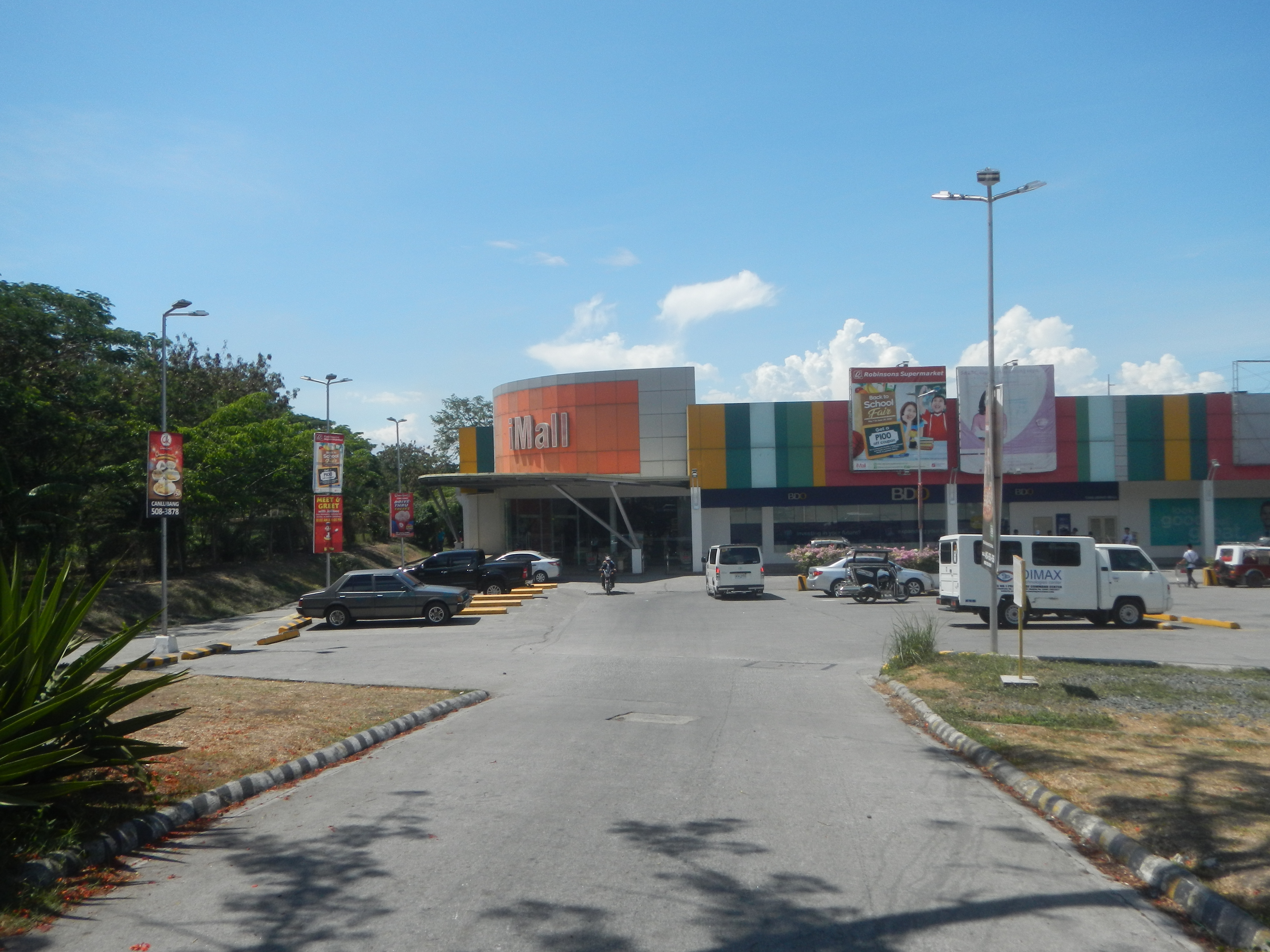
An IMall in Canlubang

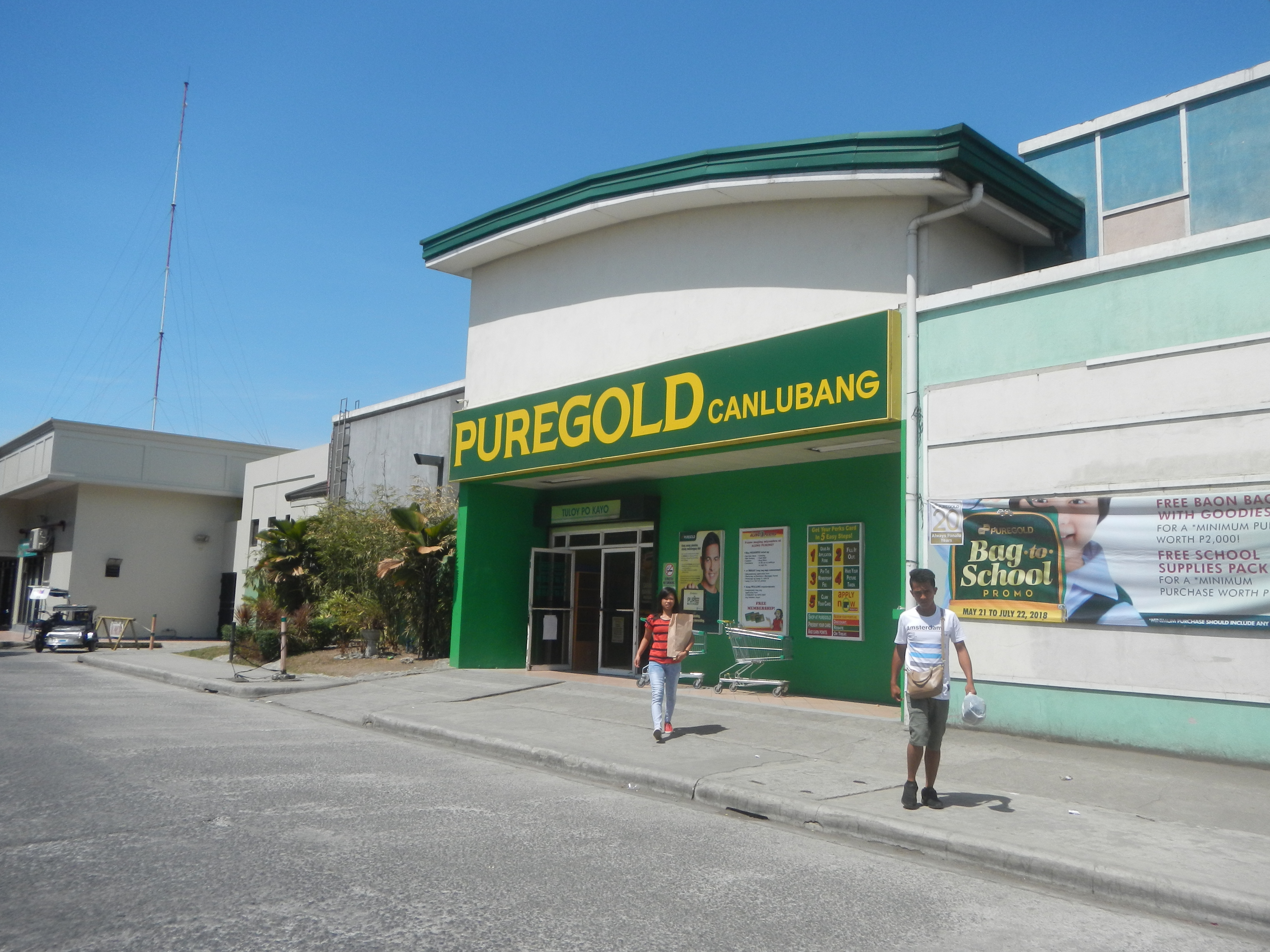
A PureGold Grocery in Carmel Mall Canlubang

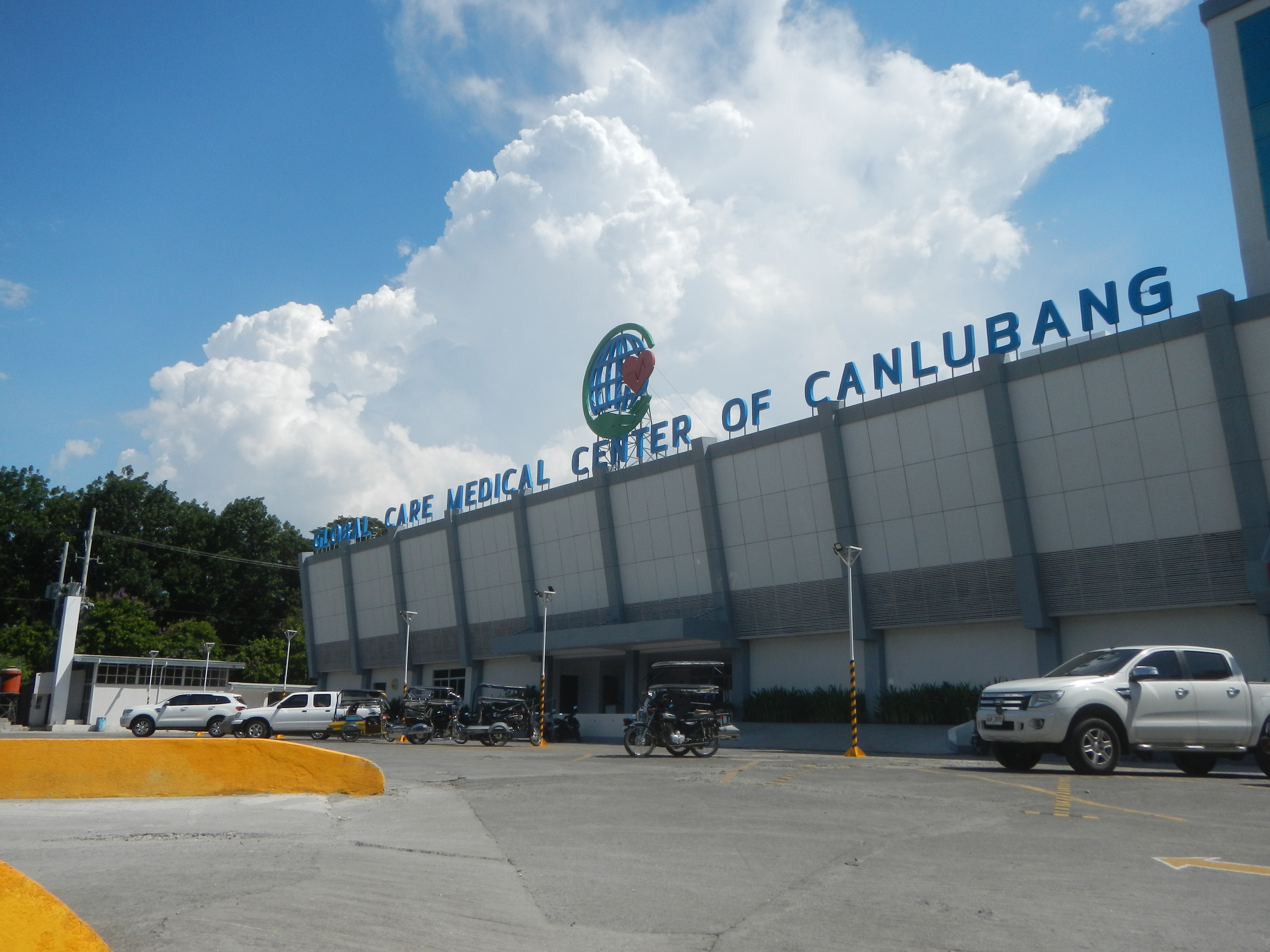
A Global Care Medical Center of Canlubang
