= Jesús Villasante =

Jesús Villasante is the head Net Innovation Unit of the Communications Networks, Content and Technology (Connect) Directorate General in the European Commission.

He read Telecommunications Engineering at the Technical University of Madrid in Madrid, Spain and later obtained a master's degree in Public Management from the Université libre de Bruxelles in Brussels, Belgium.

== See also ==
- Marson, Ingrid (May 31, 2005). "IT giants accused of exploiting open source". CNET.
- Jesús Villasante, Future Internet Assembly
