= Villasanti =

Villasanti is an Italian surname. Notable people with the surname include:

- Mario Villasanti (born 1982), Paraguayan footballer
- Mathías Villasanti (born 1997), Paraguayan footballer
- Raimundo Rolón Villasanti (1903–1981), President of Paraguay in 1949
- Richard Villasanti (born 1980), Australian rugby league player
