= Filomeno Codiñera =

- Third baseman (Baseball); Outfielder (Softball)
- Born: March 25, 1939; Manila, Philippine Commonwealth
- Died: October 25, 2016 (aged 77); Philippines

Teams
- Baseball: Canlubang Sugar Barons (1950s–1970s); Ysmael Steel (c. 1950s–1970s); Traders Royal Bank (1980s)

Filomeno Codiñera Jr. (March 25, 1939 – October 25, 2016), also known as Boy Codiñera, was a Filipino baseball and softball player. He has represented both the men's national softball and baseball teams of the Philippines. He played as an outfielder in softball and as a third baseman in baseball.

== Early life and education ==
Codiñera was born on March 25, 1939. He attended the University of Santo Tomas as an athletic scholar and was part of the college's baseball and basketball teams.

== Career ==
=== Manila Bay Baseball League ===
From the late 1950s to the 1970s, Codiñera was a member of the Canlubang Sugar Barons which dominated the Manila Bay Baseball League (MBBL) and even the local softball tournaments it participated in. He was considered as part of the "Manila's Finest" group of baseball players. Codiñera was later acquired and played for Ysmael Steel at the MBBL. Before its decline in the 1970s, Codiñera claimed that the Manila Bay Baseball League drew more crowds in the 1960s at Rizal Memorial Baseball Stadium than the nearby basketball games of Manila Industrial and Commercial Athletic Association (MICAA).

=== Philippine Baseball League ===
In the Philippine Baseball League of the 1980s, Codiñera played for the Traders Royal Bank team.

=== International ===
Codiñera represented the Philippines in the 1968 Men's Softball World Championship in Oklahoma, United States where he hit seven consecutive doubles, a feat that was noted by the Guinness Book of World Records. The team finished fourth in the 1968 edition of the softball world championship and Codiñera again represented the country in the 1972 Men's Softball World Championship hosted in Marikina. In this particular tournament, he was known for his achievement of making a grand slam home run with two outs in the final inning to defeat Mexico

He also represented the Philippine national baseball team at the 1966 World Amateur Baseball Championship in Hawaii where his team won a bronze medal.

=== Coaching ===
Codiñera served as a playing-coach for the Traders Royal Bank of the 1980s Philippine Baseball League. He also coached the softball and baseball teams of the Adamson University at the UAAP leading them to at least a dozen of titles. He also coached the MayniLA Golden Girls, a women's softball team supported by then-Manila mayor Lito Atienza that competed in the 2001 Girls Big League Softball World Series. Aside from coaching, Codiñera was appointed as the assistant coaching director for the national teams of the Philippine Sports Commission for the 1993 Southeast Asian Games and the acting president of the Amateur Softball Association of the Philippines in 1995, also served in the same post from 2001 to 2002. He also handled the Blu Girls national softball team program.

== Honors ==
On February 6, 2012, Codiñera was inducted to the Adamson's Athletes Hall of Fame due to his contribution to Adamson University's softball and baseball teams as coach despite not being an alumnus of the university.

At the 2016 PSA Annual Awards, Codiñera was given the Lifetime Achievement Award.

During the opening rites of the Canlubang Little League on November 5, 2016, the tournament gave their posthumous recognition to Codiñera, few days after his death.

== Later life and death ==
Codiñera spent some time as a police officer, which was his profession.

Codiñera had two bouts of stroke which caused him to be reliant on a wheelchair. One of his multiple bouts strokes happened in 2004 but he recovered from it. He frequented the area around Rizal Memorial Stadium and reportedly raised his own funds to accompany the national baseball teams in international tournaments. A few years later, he died late evening on October 25, 2016, due to stroke. His remains lay in state at the Holy Trinity Memorial in Parañaque.

== Personal life ==
Codiñera was married to Beatriz Guzman who was his classmate at the University of Santo Tomas. Guzman was a former collegiate volleyball player for UST. They had a daughter named Pamela and three sons Jerry, who became a star in the Philippine Basketball Association (PBA) that succeeded MICAA, Harmon, and Pat. All three became PBA basketball players.
