= 2023 Co-Ed Slow-Pitch Softball Asia Cup =

2023 softball championship

Tournament details
- Host country: Thailand
- City: Pattaya
- Dates: 24–27 May 2023
- Teams: 5
- Venue: 1 (in 1 host city)

Final positions
- Champions: Chinese Taipei (1st title)
- Runner-up: Philippines
- Third place: China
- Fourth place: Thailand

Tournament statistics
- Games played: 12

The 2023 Co-Ed Slow-Pitch Softball Asia Cup was an international mixed-gender slow-pitch softball tournament held in Pattaya, Thailand.

The tournament was held at the Siam Polo Ground from 24 to 27 May 2023. The top three teams are supposed to qualify for the 2023 WBSC Coed Slow Pitch Softball World Cup. The World Cup to be hosted in Guadalajara, Mexico in December 2023, was eventually cancelled in October 2023 due to logistical challenges.

Chinese Taipei is the inaugural champions.

== Participants ==
- China
- Chinese Taipei
- Philippines
- Thailand
- Singapore

== Preliminary round ==
Pos	Team	Pld	W	L	RF	RA	RD	PCT	GB	Qualification
1	Chinese Taipei	4	4	0	50	31	+19	1.000	—	Advance to Final
2	Philippines	4	3	1	61	36	+25	.750	1	Advance to Final
3	China	4	2	2	41	30	+11	.500	2	Advance to Bronze medal game
4	Thailand (H)	4	1	3	32	64	−32	.250	3	Advance to Bronze medal game
5	Singapore	4	0	4	28	51	−23	.000	4	

Source: Softball Asia
(H) Hosts

=== Matches ===
Date	Road	Score	Home
24 May	China	6–7	Philippines
24 May	Singapore	5–12	Chinese Taipei
24 May	China	10–4	Thailand
24 May	Singapore	7–15	Philippines
25 May	Chinese Taipei	17–10	Thailand
25 May	China	17–10	Singapore
25 May	Philippines	8–12	Chinese Taipei
26 May	Singapore	6–7	Thailand
26 May	China	8–9	Chinese Taipei
26 May	Philippines	31–11	Thailand

== Final round ==
=== Third place play-off ===
27 May 2023 11:00 (UTC+7) Siam Polo Ground
Team	1	2	3	4	5	R	H	E
Thailand	0	0	0	0	0	0	5	4
China	4	1	5	6	X	16	15	2
Boxscore

=== Final ===
27 May 2023 14:30 (UTC+7) Siam Polo Ground
Team	1	2	3	4	5	6	7	R	H	E
Philippines	1	0	0	0	1	0	0	2	5	0
Chinese Taipei	3	0	1	1	3	0	X	8	12	1
Boxscore

== Final standings ==
Qualified for: 2023 WBSC Coed Slow Pitch Softball World Cup

Rank	Team
Gold medal	Chinese Taipei
Silver medal	Philippines (Note: Philippines originally qualified for the 2023 WBSC Coed Slow Pitch Softball World Cup. However the Philippines withdrew with fourth placers Thailand replacing them. The World Cup was eventually cancelled.)
Bronze medal	China
4th	Thailand
5th	Singapore

Source: Softball Asia
