= 2025 Women's Softball European Championship =

International softball tournament

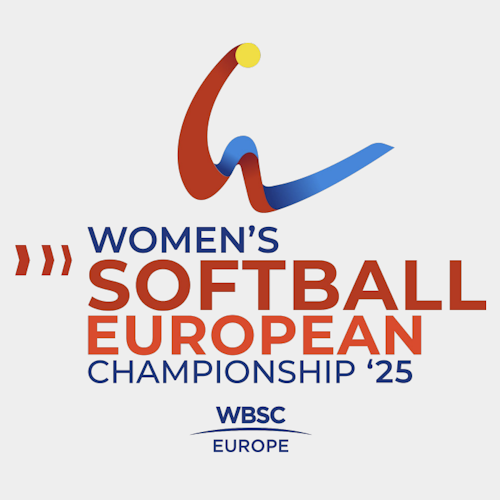

Tournament details
- Host country: Czechia
- Dates: 7–13 September 2025
- Teams: 21
- Defending champions: Italy (2024)

Final positions
- Champions: Italy (14th title)
- Runner-up: Netherlands
- Third place: Great Britain
- Fourth place: Spain

Tournament statistics
- Games played: 82
- Attendance: 8,096 (99 per game)
- Last updated on 14 September 2025

The 2025 Women's Softball European Championship was an international European softball competition held in Prague, Czech Republic from 7 to 13 September 2025. It was the 25th edition of the Women's Softball European Championship.

This edition of the tournament was held at four venues in Prague: Spectrum Praha in the Černý Most district, Tempo Praha in the Modřany district, SaBaT Praha in the Troja district, and Eagles Praha in the Krč district.

In the gold medal game, Italy defeated the Netherlands 4–3, with Elisa Cecchetti hitting a walk-off single in the eighth inning to secure the nation’s 14th European Women’s Softball title.

== Opening round ==
=== Group A ===
Pos	Team	Pld	W	L	RF	RA	RD	PCT	GB	Qualification
1	Israel	2	2	0	29	1	+28	1.000	—	Advance to Group X
2	Poland	2	1	1	9	11	−2	.500	1	Advance to 13–16th places classification
3	Croatia	2	0	2	3	29	−26	.000	2	Advance to 17–21st places classification

Source: WBSC

September 7, 2025; 11:30	Poland	0–9 (5)	Israel	Tempo, Prague 12; Attendance: 50
September 7, 2025; 11:30		Boxscore		Tempo, Prague 12; Attendance: 50

September 7, 2025; 16:30	Israel	20–1 (3)	Croatia	Tempo, Prague 12; Attendance: 60
September 7, 2025; 16:30		Boxscore		Tempo, Prague 12; Attendance: 60

September 8, 2025; 13:00	Croatia	2–9 (5)	Poland	Eagles - Field 1, Prague 4 Attendance: 30
September 8, 2025; 13:00		Boxscore		Eagles - Field 1, Prague 4 Attendance: 30

=== Group B ===
Pos	Team	Pld	W	L	RF	RA	RD	PCT	GB	Qualification
1	Ukraine	2	2	0	14	3	+11	1.000	—	Advance to Group Y
2	Denmark	2	1	1	11	11	0	.500	1	Advance to 13–16th places classification
3	Slovakia	2	0	2	5	16	−11	.000	2	Advance to 17–21st places classification

Source: WBSC

September 7, 2025; 11:00	Slovakia	2-6	Ukraine	Spectrum Praha, Prague 14; Attendance: 78
September 7, 2025; 11:00		Boxscore		Spectrum Praha, Prague 14; Attendance: 78

September 7, 2025; 15:00	Ukraine	8-1	Denmark	Spectrum Praha, Prague 14; Attendance: 97
September 7, 2025; 15:00		Boxscore		Spectrum Praha, Prague 14; Attendance: 97

September 8, 2025; 11:00	Denmark	10-3 (6)	Slovakia	Eagles - Field 2, Prague 4 Attendance: 17
September 8, 2025; 11:00		Boxscore		Eagles - Field 2, Prague 4 Attendance: 17

=== Group C ===
Pos	Team	Pld	W	L	RF	RA	RD	PCT	GB	Qualification
1	Switzerland	2	2	0	23	10	+13	1.000	—	Advance to Group Y
2	Belgium	2	1	1	30	16	+14	.500	1	Advance to 13–16th places classification
3	Finland	2	0	2	0	27	−27	.000	2	Advance to 17–21st places classification

Source: WBSC

September 7, 2025; 09:00	Finland	0-7 (5)	Switzerland	Tempo, Prague 12; Attendance: 20
September 7, 2025; 09:00		Boxscore		Tempo, Prague 12; Attendance: 20

September 7, 2025; 14:00	Finland	0–20 (3)	Belgium	Tempo, Prague 12; Attendance: 45
September 7, 2025; 14:00		Boxscore		Tempo, Prague 12; Attendance: 45

September 8, 2025; 10:00	Belgium	10–16	Switzerland	Eagles - Field 1, Prague 4 Attendance: 200
September 8, 2025; 10:00		Boxscore		Eagles - Field 1, Prague 4 Attendance: 200

=== Group D ===
Pos	Team	Pld	W	L	RF	RA	RD	PCT	GB	Qualification
1	Austria	3	3	0	38	10	+28	1.000	—	Advance to Group X
2	Sweden	3	2	1	26	8	+18	.667	1	Advance to 13–16th places classification
3	Lithuania	3	1	2	10	25	−15	.333	2	Advance to 17–21st places classification
4	Turkey	3	0	3	6	37	−31	.000	3	Advance to 17–21st places classification

Source: WBSC

September 7, 2025; 10:00	Lithuania	2-17 (3)	Austria	Eagles - Field 1, Prague 4 Attendance: 23
September 7, 2025; 10:00		Boxscore		Eagles - Field 1, Prague 4 Attendance: 23

September 7, 2025; 11:00	Turkey	1–15 (4)	Sweden	Eagles - Field 2, Prague 4 Attendance: 10
September 7, 2025; 11:00		Boxscore		Eagles - Field 2, Prague 4 Attendance: 10

September 7, 2025; 16:00	Sweden	3-6	Austria	Eagles - Field 1, Prague 4 Attendance: 60
September 7, 2025; 16:00		Boxscore		Eagles - Field 1, Prague 4 Attendance: 60

September 7, 2025; 16:30	Turkey	0-7 (5)	Lithuania	Eagles - Field 2, Prague 4 Attendance: 10
September 7, 2025; 16:30		Boxscore		Eagles - Field 2, Prague 4 Attendance: 10

September 8, 2025; 10:00	Austria	15-5 (4)	Turkey	SaBaT, Prague 7 Attendance: 54
September 8, 2025; 10:00		Boxscore		SaBaT, Prague 7 Attendance: 54

September 8, 2025; 10:00	Lithuania	1-8 (6)	Sweden	Spectrum Praha, Prague 14; Attendance: 120
September 8, 2025; 10:00		Boxscore		Spectrum Praha, Prague 14; Attendance: 120

=== Group X ===
Pos	Team	Pld	W	L	RF	RA	RD	PCT	GB	Qualification
1	Italy	5	4	1	44	7	+37	.800	—	Advance to Group Z
2	Czech Republic (H)	5	4	1	24	15	+9	.800	—	Advance to Group Z
3	Spain	5	4	1	20	15	+5	.800	—	Advance to Group Z
4	Israel	5	2	3	16	24	−8	.400	2	Advance to Group E
5	Germany	5	1	4	6	22	−16	.200	3	Advance to Group E
6	Austria	5	0	5	5	32	−27	.000	4	Advance to Group E

Source: WBSC
(H) Hosts

September 7, 2025; 16:00	Italy	11-0 (4)	Germany	SaBaT, Prague 7 Attendance: 40
September 7, 2025; 16:00		Boxscore		SaBaT, Prague 7 Attendance: 40

September 7, 2025; 20:30	Czech Republic	6-1	Spain	Eagles - Field 1, Prague 4 Attendance: 200
September 7, 2025; 20:30		Boxscore		Eagles - Field 1, Prague 4 Attendance: 200

September 8, 2025; 13:00	Spain	5-3	Italy	Spectrum Praha, Prague 14; Attendance: 168
September 8, 2025; 13:00		Boxscore		Spectrum Praha, Prague 14; Attendance: 168

September 8, 2025; 16:00	Israel	2–1	Austria	Eagles - Field 2, Prague 4 Attendance: 54
September 8, 2025; 16:00		Boxscore		Eagles - Field 2, Prague 4 Attendance: 54

September 8, 2025; 16:30	Germany	3-5	Czech Republic	Spectrum Praha, Prague 14; Attendance: 213
September 8, 2025; 16:30		Boxscore		Spectrum Praha, Prague 14; Attendance: 213

September 9, 2025; 10:00	Israel	1-11 (4)	Italy	Eagles - Field 1, Prague 4 Attendance: 187
September 9, 2025; 10:00		Boxscore		Eagles - Field 1, Prague 4 Attendance: 187

September 9, 2025; 11:00	Spain	1-0	Germany	Eagles - Field 2, Prague 4 Attendance: 98
September 9, 2025; 11:00		Boxscore		Eagles - Field 2, Prague 4 Attendance: 98

September 9, 2025; 12:30	Austria	2-10 (6)	Czech Republic	Tempo, Prague 12; Attendance: 212
September 9, 2025; 12:30		Boxscore		Tempo, Prague 12; Attendance: 212

September 9, 2025; 16:30	Spain	6-0	Austria	Tempo, Prague 12; Attendance: 42
September 9, 2025; 16:30		Boxscore		Tempo, Prague 12; Attendance: 42

September 9, 2025; 16:30	Germany	1-6	Israel	Eagles - Field 2, Prague 4 Attendance: 81
September 9, 2025; 16:30		Boxscore		Eagles - Field 2, Prague 4 Attendance: 81

September 9, 2025; 19:30	Italy	8-0	Czech Republic	Eagles - Field 1, Prague 4 Attendance: 623
September 9, 2025; 19:30		Boxscore		Eagles - Field 1, Prague 4 Attendance: 623

September 10, 2025; 10:00	Israel	6-7	Spain	SaBaT, Prague 7 Attendance: 132
September 10, 2025; 10:00		Boxscore		SaBaT, Prague 7 Attendance: 132

September 10, 2025; 10:00	Austria	1-2	Germany	Spectrum Praha, Prague 14; Attendance: 120
September 10, 2025; 10:00		Boxscore		Spectrum Praha, Prague 14; Attendance: 120

September 10, 2025; 14:00	Italy	12-1 (6)	Austria	Spectrum Praha, Prague 14; Attendance: 72
September 10, 2025; 14:00		Boxscore		Spectrum Praha, Prague 14; Attendance: 72

September 11, 2025; 13:00	Czech Republic	4-1	Israel	Eagles - Field 2, Prague 4 Attendance: 200
September 11, 2025; 13:00		Boxscore		Eagles - Field 2, Prague 4 Attendance: 200

=== Group Y ===
Pos	Team	Pld	W	L	RF	RA	RD	PCT	GB	Qualification
1	Netherlands	5	5	0	35	2	+33	1.000	—	Advance to Group Z
2	Great Britain	5	4	1	32	3	+29	.800	1	Advance to Group Z
3	France	5	3	2	27	16	+11	.600	2	Advance to Group Z
4	Ukraine	5	2	3	20	42	−22	.400	3	Advance to Group E
5	Greece	5	1	4	22	33	−11	.200	4	Advance to Group E
6	Switzerland	5	0	5	6	46	−40	.000	5	Advance to Group E

Source: WBSC

September 7, 2025; 13:00	Great Britain	5-2	France	Eagles - Field 1, Prague 4 Attendance: 50
September 7, 2025; 13:00		Boxscore		Eagles - Field 1, Prague 4 Attendance: 50

September 7, 2025; 14:00	Greece	0–9 (5)	Netherlands	Eagles - Field 2, Prague 4 Attendance: 30
September 7, 2025; 14:00		Boxscore		Eagles - Field 2, Prague 4 Attendance: 30

September 8, 2025; 16:30	Greece	0-12 (4)	Great Britain	Eagles - Field 1, Prague 4 Attendance: 70
September 8, 2025; 16:30		Boxscore		Eagles - Field 1, Prague 4 Attendance: 70

September 8, 2025; 16:30	Ukraine	11-4	Switzerland	SaBaT, Prague 7 Attendance: 36
September 8, 2025; 16:30		Boxscore		SaBaT, Prague 7 Attendance: 36

September 8, 2025; 19:30	France	0-7 (5)	Netherlands	Eagles - Field 1, Prague 4 Attendance: 69
September 8, 2025; 19:30		Boxscore		Eagles - Field 1, Prague 4 Attendance: 69

September 9, 2025; 10:00	Greece	15-0 (4)	Switzerland	SaBaT, Prague 7 Attendance: 162
September 9, 2025; 10:00		Boxscore		SaBaT, Prague 7 Attendance: 162

September 9, 2025; 10:00	France	17-2 (5)	Ukraine	Spectrum Praha, Prague 14; Attendance: 87
September 9, 2025; 10:00		Boxscore		Spectrum Praha, Prague 14; Attendance: 87

September 9, 2025; 16:30	Great Britain	8-0 (5)	Switzerland	SaBaT, Prague 7 Attendance: 61
September 9, 2025; 16:30		Boxscore		SaBaT, Prague 7 Attendance: 61

September 9, 2025; 16:30	Netherlands	9-0 (5)	Ukraine	Spectrum Praha, Prague 14; Attendance: 97
September 9, 2025; 16:30		Boxscore		Spectrum Praha, Prague 14; Attendance: 97

September 10, 2025; 10:00	Ukraine	0-7 (5)	Great Britain	Eagles - Field 1, Prague 4 Attendance: 111
September 10, 2025; 10:00		Boxscore		Eagles - Field 1, Prague 4 Attendance: 111

September 10, 2025; 10:00	Greece	2-5	France	Tempo, Prague 12
September 10, 2025; 10:00		Boxscore		Tempo, Prague 12

September 10, 2025; 11:00	Switzerland	2-9 (5)	Netherlands	Eagles - Field 2, Prague 4 Attendance: 32
September 10, 2025; 11:00		Boxscore		Eagles - Field 2, Prague 4 Attendance: 32

September 11, 2025; 11:00	Ukraine	7-5	Greece	Spectrum Praha, Prague 14; Attendance: 42
September 11, 2025; 11:00		Boxscore		Spectrum Praha, Prague 14; Attendance: 42

September 11, 2025; 11:00	Switzerland	0-3	France	Tempo, Prague 12; Attendance: 32
September 11, 2025; 11:00		Boxscore		Tempo, Prague 12; Attendance: 32

September 11, 2025; 11:00	Great Britain	0-1	Netherlands	Eagles - Field 2, Prague 4 Attendance: 162
September 11, 2025; 11:00		Boxscore		Eagles - Field 2, Prague 4 Attendance: 162

== 17–21st places classification ==
=== Group G ===
Match already played between the teams D3 (Lithuania) and D4 (Turkey) is carried over.

Pos	Team	Pld	W	L	RF	RA	RD	PCT	GB	Qualification
1	Croatia	4	3	1	32	19	+13	.750	—	Rank 17
2	Finland	4	3	1	25	11	+14	.750	—	Rank 18
3	Slovakia	4	2	2	34	30	+4	.500	1	Rank 19
4	Lithuania	4	2	2	24	21	+3	.500	1	Rank 20
5	Turkey	4	0	4	10	44	−34	.000	3	Rank 21

Updated to match(es) played on 14 September 2025. Source: WBSC

September 9, 2025; 13:00	Slovakia	1-3	Finland	Eagles - Field 1, Prague 4 Attendance: 57
September 9, 2025; 13:00		Boxscore		Eagles - Field 1, Prague 4 Attendance: 57

September 9, 2025; 16:00	Lithuania	5-3	Croatia	Eagles - Field 1, Prague 4 Attendance: 40
September 9, 2025; 16:00		Boxscore		Eagles - Field 1, Prague 4 Attendance: 40

September 10, 2025; 13:00	Lithuania	5–8	Slovakia	SaBaT, Prague 7 Attendance: 13
September 10, 2025; 13:00		Boxscore		SaBaT, Prague 7 Attendance: 13

September 10, 2025; 13:00	Turkey	0-10 (4)	Finland	Tempo, Prague 12; Attendance: 22
September 10, 2025; 13:00		Boxscore		Tempo, Prague 12; Attendance: 22

September 11, 2025; 13:30	Turkey	8-15 (5)	Slovakia	Tempo, Prague 12; Attendance: 28
September 11, 2025; 13:30		Boxscore		Tempo, Prague 12; Attendance: 28

September 11, 2025; 13:30	Finland	2-3	Croatia	Spectrum Praha, Prague 14; Attendance: 73
September 11, 2025; 13:30		Boxscore		Spectrum Praha, Prague 14; Attendance: 73

September 12, 2025; 13:00	Turkey	2-12 (4)	Croatia	SaBaT, Prague 7 Attendance: 25
September 12, 2025; 13:00		Boxscore		SaBaT, Prague 7 Attendance: 25

September 12, 2025; 13:30	Finland	10-7	Lithuania	Eagles - Field 2, Prague 4 Attendance: 24
September 12, 2025; 13:30		Boxscore		Eagles - Field 2, Prague 4 Attendance: 24

September 12, 2025; 16:30	Croatia	14-10	Slovakia	SaBaT, Prague 7 Attendance: 44
September 12, 2025; 16:30		Boxscore		SaBaT, Prague 7 Attendance: 44

== 13–16th places classification ==
=== Group F ===
Pos	Team	Pld	W	L	RF	RA	RD	PCT	GB	Qualification
1	Belgium	3	3	0	22	11	+11	1.000	—	Advance to 13–14th places classification
2	Poland	3	1	2	19	20	−1	.333	2	Advance to 13–14th places classification
3	Sweden	3	1	2	15	22	−7	.333	2	Advance to 15–16th places classification
4	Denmark	3	1	2	14	17	−3	.333	2	Advance to 15–16th places classification

Source: WBSC

September 9, 2025; 13:00	Poland	14-7 (5)	Sweden	SaBaT, Prague 7 Attendance: 23
September 9, 2025; 13:00		Boxscore		SaBaT, Prague 7 Attendance: 23

September 9, 2025; 13:00	Denmark	5-9	Belgium	Spectrum Praha, Prague 14; Attendance: 112
September 9, 2025; 13:00		Boxscore		Spectrum Praha, Prague 14; Attendance: 112

September 10, 2025; 13:00	Poland	2-3	Denmark	Eagles - Field 1, Prague 4 Attendance: 56
September 10, 2025; 13:00		Boxscore		Eagles - Field 1, Prague 4 Attendance: 56

September 10, 2025; 14:00	Belgium	10-0 (5)	Sweden	Eagles - Field 2, Prague 4 Attendance: 61
September 10, 2025; 14:00		Boxscore		Eagles - Field 2, Prague 4 Attendance: 61

September 11, 2025; 14:00	Belgium	5-2	Poland	SaBaT, Prague 7 Attendance: 39
September 11, 2025; 14:00		Boxscore		SaBaT, Prague 7 Attendance: 39

September 12, 2025; 13:00	Sweden	13-7	Denmark	Tempo, Prague 12; Attendance: 32
September 12, 2025; 13:00		Boxscore		Tempo, Prague 12; Attendance: 32

=== 15–16th places classification ===
September 13, 2025; 11:00	Denmark	11-4 (6)	Sweden	Eagles - Field 2, Prague 4 Attendance: 22
September 13, 2025; 11:00		Boxscore		Eagles - Field 2, Prague 4 Attendance: 22

=== 13–14th places classification ===
September 13, 2025; 13:00	Poland	9-12	Belgium	Eagles - Field 2, Prague 4 Attendance: 38
September 13, 2025; 13:00		Boxscore		Eagles - Field 2, Prague 4 Attendance: 38

== 7–12th places classification ==
=== Group E ===
Matches already played between the teams of group X (X4, X5 and X6), and Group Y (Y4, Y5 and Y6) are carried over.

Pos	Team	Pld	W	L	RF	RA	RD	PCT	GB	Qualification
1	Israel	5	4	1	21	6	+15	.800	—	Rank 7
2	Germany	5	4	1	33	12	+21	.800	—	Rank 8
3	Austria	5	2	3	22	14	+8	.400	2	Rank 9
4	Greece	5	2	3	32	28	+4	.400	2	Rank 10
5	Ukraine	5	2	3	21	30	−9	.400	2	Rank 11
6	Switzerland	5	1	4	8	47	−39	.200	3	Rank 12

Source: WBSC

September 11, 2025; 16:30	Greece	4-11 (6)	Germany	Spectrum Praha, Prague 14; Attendance: 53
September 11, 2025; 16:30		Boxscore		Spectrum Praha, Prague 14; Attendance: 53

September 11, 2025; 16:30	Austria	10-1 (5)	Switzerland	Tempo, Prague 12; Attendance: 11
September 11, 2025; 16:30		Boxscore		Tempo, Prague 12; Attendance: 11

September 11, 2025; 17:00	Israel	5-0	Ukraine	Eagles - Field 2, Prague 4 Attendance: 43
September 11, 2025; 17:00		Boxscore		Eagles - Field 2, Prague 4 Attendance: 43

September 12, 2025; 10:00	Switzerland	3-2	Israel	Spectrum Praha, Prague 14; Attendance: 29
September 12, 2025; 10:00		Boxscore		Spectrum Praha, Prague 14; Attendance: 29

September 12, 2025; 10:00	Germany	10-1 (5)	Ukraine	Tempo, Prague 12; Attendance: 61
September 12, 2025; 10:00		Boxscore		Tempo, Prague 12; Attendance: 61

September 12, 2025; 12:30	Austria	4-7	Greece	Spectrum Praha, Prague 14; Attendance: 50
September 12, 2025; 12:30		Boxscore		Spectrum Praha, Prague 14; Attendance: 50

September 12, 2025; 16:00	Greece	1-6	Israel	Spectrum Praha, Prague 14; Attendance: 62
September 12, 2025; 16:00		Boxscore		Spectrum Praha, Prague 14; Attendance: 62

September 12, 2025; 16:30	Switzerland	0-9 (5)	Germany	Tempo, Prague 12; Attendance: 33
September 12, 2025; 16:30		Boxscore		Tempo, Prague 12; Attendance: 33

September 12, 2025; 20:00	Austria	6-2	Ukraine	Spectrum Praha, Prague 14; Attendance: 62
September 12, 2025; 20:00		Boxscore		Spectrum Praha, Prague 14; Attendance: 62

== Super Round ==
=== Group Z ===
Matches already played between the teams of group X (X1, X2 and X3), and Group Y (Y1, Y2 and Y3) are carried over.

Pos	Team	Pld	W	L	RF	RA	RD	PCT	GB	Qualification
1	Italy	5	4	1	28	8	+20	.800	—	Advance to Gold–Silver places classification
2	Netherlands	5	4	1	22	2	+20	.800	—	Advance to Gold–Silver places classification
3	Great Britain	5	2	3	20	16	+4	.400	2	Advance to Bronze–4th places classification
4	Spain	5	2	3	12	26	−14	.400	2	Advance to Bronze–4th places classification
5	Czech Republic (H)	5	2	3	16	22	−6	.400	2	Rank 5
6	France	5	1	4	6	30	−24	.200	3	Rank 6

Updated to match(es) played on 13 September 2025. Source: WBSC
(H) Hosts

September 11, 2025; 17:00	France	1-0	Spain	SaBaT, Prague 7 Attendance: 70
September 11, 2025; 17:00		Boxscore		SaBaT, Prague 7 Attendance: 70

September 11, 2025; 19:00	Netherlands	1-2	Italy	Spectrum Praha, Prague 14; Attendance: 298
September 11, 2025; 19:00		Boxscore		Spectrum Praha, Prague 14; Attendance: 298

September 11, 2025; 19:30	Great Britain	9-0 (5)	Czech Republic	Eagles - Field 1, Prague 4
September 11, 2025; 19:30		Boxscore		Eagles - Field 1, Prague 4

September 12, 2025; 10:00	France	2-10 (5)	Czech Republic	SaBaT, Prague 7 Attendance: 131
September 12, 2025; 10:00		Boxscore		SaBaT, Prague 7 Attendance: 131

September 12, 2025; 10:00	Great Britain	1-8 (5)	Italy	Eagles - Field 1, Prague 4 Attendance: 517
September 12, 2025; 10:00		Boxscore		Eagles - Field 1, Prague 4 Attendance: 517

September 12, 2025; 10:30	Spain	0-11 (4)	Netherlands	Eagles - Field 2, Prague 4 Attendance: 41
September 12, 2025; 10:30		Boxscore		Eagles - Field 2, Prague 4 Attendance: 41

September 12, 2025; 16:00	Spain	6-5	Great Britain	Eagles - Field 1, Prague 4 Attendance: 150
September 12, 2025; 16:00		Boxscore		Eagles - Field 1, Prague 4 Attendance: 150

September 12, 2025; 16:30	France	1-8 (5)	Italy	Eagles - Field 2, Prague 4
September 12, 2025; 16:30		Boxscore		Eagles - Field 2, Prague 4

September 12, 2025; 19:30	Czech Republic	0-2	Netherlands	Eagles - Field 1, Prague 4 Attendance: 520
September 12, 2025; 19:30		Boxscore		Eagles - Field 1, Prague 4 Attendance: 520

== Finals ==
=== Bronze–4th places classification ===
September 13, 2025; 13:00	Spain	2–4	Great Britain	Eagles - Field 1, Prague 4

Team	1	2	3	4	5	6	7	R	H	E
(Spain) ESP	0	1	0	1	0	0	0	2	8	2
(United Kingdom) GBR	0	1	0	0	3	0	X	4	8	1
WP: Georgina Corrick LP: Beatriz Alonso; Attendance: 327; Boxscore

=== Gold–Silver places classification ===
September 13, 2025; 17:00	Netherlands	3–4 (8)	Italy	Eagles - Field 1, Prague 4

Team	1	2	3	4	5	6	7	8	R	H	E
(Netherlands) NED	2	1	0	0	0	0	0	0	3	8	4
(Italy) ITA	0	0	2	0	1	0	0	1	4	4	0
WP: Ilaria Cacciamani LP: Lisa Hop; Attendance: 572; Boxscore

== Final Ranking ==
Rk	Team	W	L	Pct.
1st place, gold medalist(s)	Italy	8	1	.889
2nd place, silver medalist(s)	Netherlands	7	2	.778
3rd place, bronze medalist(s)	Great Britain	6	3	.667
4	Spain	5	4	.556
5	Czech Republic	5	3	.625
6	France	4	4	.500
7	Israel	6	4	.600
8	Germany	4	4	.500
9	Austria	5	6	.455
10	Greece	2	6	.250
11	Ukraine	4	6	.400
12	Switzerland	3	7	.300
13	Belgium	5	1	.833
14	Poland	2	4	.333
15	Denmark	3	3	.500
16	Sweden	3	4	.429
17	Croatia	3	3	.500
18	Finland	3	3	.500
19	Slovakia	2	4	.333
20	Lithuania	2	4	.333
21	Turkey	0	6	.000

== Statistical leaders ==
=== Batting (min. 15 AB) ===
Batting Average

Name	BA
(Poland) Sandra Szczypka	.667
(Sweden) Sofia Eriksson	.650
(Denmark) Evie Craig	.619
(Poland) Julia Kirsanow	.556
(Belgium) Kate Geldof	.545

Home Runs

Name	HRs
(Italy) Erika Piancastelli	5
(Israel) Tara Vandewater	4
(Italy) McKenzie Barbara	3
(Israel) Amanda Licht	3
8 tied with	2

Runs batted in

Name	RBIs
(Belgium) Caroline Goyvaerts	13
(Italy) Erika Piancastelli	12
(Israel) Tara Vandewater	11
(Switzerland) Michelle Zehnder	11
(Netherlands) Britt Vonk	10

Stolen bases

Name	SBs
(Netherlands) Anaïse Piar	5
(Sweden) Sofia Eriksson	4
(Sweden) Paris Brienesse	4
(Netherlands) Britt Vonk	3

Slugging percentage

Name	SLG
(Poland) Julia Kirsanow	1.167
(Italy) Erika Piancastelli	1.036
(Sweden) Sofia Eriksson	.950
(Sweden) Paris Brienesse	.923
(Belgium) Kate Geldof	.909

On-base percentage

Name	OBP
(Poland) Sandra Szczypka	.773
(Sweden) Sofia Eriksson	.667
(Denmark) Evie Craig	.652
(Poland) Julia Kirsanow	.619
(Netherlands) Britt Vonk	.619

=== Pitching (min. 15 IP) ===
Earned run average

Name	ERA
(United Kingdom) Paytn Monticelli	0.00
(Netherlands) Lisa Hop	0.68
(Netherlands) Eva Voortman	0.69
(Israel) Robyn Wampler	1.26
(Spain) Beatriz Alonso	1.50

Strikeouts

Name	Ks
(Israel) Robyn Wampler	46
(Lithuania) Nomeda Neverauskaitė	41
(United Kingdom) Georgina Corrick	34
(Czech Republic) Kateřina Kindermannová	34
(United Kingdom) Paytn Monticelli	33

Innings pitched

Name	IPs
(Israel) Robyn Wampler	39.0
(Lithuania) Nomeda Neverauskaitė	29.0
(France) Clelia Costes	27.1
(Finland) Sanni Karhiaho	27.0
(Czech Republic) Kateřina Kindermannová	27.0

Batting average against

Name	BA
(United Kingdom) Paytn Monticelli	.073
(Netherlands) Eva Voortman	.095
(Netherlands) Lisa Hop	.099
(Germany) Hanna Held	.164
(Germany) Lee Lankhorst	.182

Wins

Name	W
(Israel) Robyn Wampler	5
(Spain) Beatriz Alonso	4
(Denmark) Mathilde Nielsen	3
(Belgium) Sara de Graeve	3
(Netherlands) Eva Voortman	3
