= ESF Women's Division B Championship =

- Sport: Softball
- Founded: 1997
- No. of teams: 10 (in 2009)
- Continent: Europe
- Most recent champion: Belgium
- Most titles: 7 teams (1)

The European Softball Women Division B Championship is a minor championship tournament between national women softball teams in Europe, governed by the European Softball Federation.

The winner of this tournament will qualify for the next Division A Championship.

== Results ==
| Year | Host | Final | | Semifinalists | |
| Year | Host | Champions | Runners-up | 3rd place | 4th place |
| 1997 | (Czech Republic); Prague | Russia | Great Britain | Slovakia | Switzerland |
| 1999 | (Belgium); Antwerp | Germany | Great Britain | Austria | France |
| 2001 | (Austria); Vienna | Sweden | Great Britain | Slovakia | France |
| 2003 | (Italy); Saronno | Greece | Austria | Slovakia | Switzerland |
| 2005 | (Czech Republic); Prague | Slovakia | Austria | France | Croatia |
| 2007 | (Croatia); Zagreb | Spain | France | Croatia | Israel |
| 2009 | (Belgium); Hoboken | Belgium | Sweden | Croatia | Israel |

=== Medal table ===
| Rank | Nation | Gold | Silver | Bronze | Total |
|---|---|---|---|---|---|
| 1 | Sweden | 1 | 1 | 0 | 2 |
| 2 | Slovakia | 1 | 0 | 3 | 4 |
| 3 | Belgium | 1 | 0 | 0 | 1 |
| 3 | Germany | 1 | 0 | 0 | 1 |
| 3 | Greece | 1 | 0 | 0 | 1 |
| 3 | Russia | 1 | 0 | 0 | 1 |
| 3 | Spain | 1 | 0 | 0 | 1 |
| 8 | Great Britain | 0 | 3 | 0 | 3 |
| 9 | Austria | 0 | 2 | 1 | 3 |
| 10 | France | 0 | 1 | 1 | 2 |
| 11 | Croatia | 0 | 0 | 2 | 2 |
| Totals (11 entries) | | 7 | 7 | 7 | 21 |

== See also ==
- European Baseball Championship
