= 2019 Women's Softball European Championship =

Tournament details
- Host country: Czech Republic
- Dates: 30 June - 6 July 2019
- Teams: 23
- Defending champions: Netherlands (2017)

Final positions
- Champions: Italy (11th title)
- Runner-up: Netherlands
- Third place: Great Britain
- Fourth place: Czech Republic

The 2019 ESF Women's Championship was an international European softball competition that was held in Ostrava and Frýdek-Místek, Czech Republic; and Rybnik and Żory, Poland from 30 June to 6 July 2019.

== Preliminary round ==
=== Group A ===
#	Team	Pld	W	L	AVG	
1	Czech Republic (H)	5	5	0	1000	Qualified for Semifinal Group
2	France	5	4	1	800	Qualified for Semifinal Group
3	Sweden	5	3	2	600	Qualified for 9th-16th Place Group
4	Belgium	5	2	3	400	Qualified for 9th-16th Place Group
5	Slovakia	5	1	4	200	Qualified for 17th-23rd Place Group
6	Lithuania	5	0	5	0	Qualified for 17th-23rd Place Group

June 30, 2019; 11:15	Czech Republic	15-0 (3)	Lithuania	Ostrava 1 Attendance: 150
June 30, 2019; 11:15		Boxscore		Ostrava 1 Attendance: 150

June 30, 2019; 11:15	France	14-0 (4)	Belgium	Ostrava 2 Attendance: 35
June 30, 2019; 11:15		Boxscore		Ostrava 2 Attendance: 35

June 30, 2019; 13:30	Sweden	2-1	Slovakia	Ostrava 1 Attendance: 100
June 30, 2019; 13:30		Boxscore		Ostrava 1 Attendance: 100

June 30, 2019; 16:00	France	19-0 (3)	Lithuania	Ostrava 1 Attendance: N/A
June 30, 2019; 16:00		Boxscore		Ostrava 1 Attendance: N/A

June 30, 2019; 18:00	Belgium	2-1	Slovakia	Ostrava 2 Attendance: 120
June 30, 2019; 18:00		Boxscore		Ostrava 2 Attendance: 120

June 30, 2019; 21:00	Czech Republic	7-0 (5)	Sweden	Ostrava 1 Attendance: 350
June 30, 2019; 21:00		Boxscore		Ostrava 1 Attendance: 350

July 1, 2019; 9:00	Lithuania	6-27 (3)	Belgium	Ostrava 2 Attendance: 20
July 1, 2019; 9:00		Boxscore		Ostrava 2 Attendance: 20

July 1, 2019; 9:30	Slovakia	9-11 (8)	France	Frýdek-Místek; Attendance: 40
July 1, 2019; 9:30		Boxscore		Frýdek-Místek; Attendance: 40

July 1, 2019; 13:30	Belgium	7-11 (5)	Sweden	Ostrava 2 Attendance: 45
July 1, 2019; 13:30		Boxscore		Ostrava 2 Attendance: 45

July 1, 2019; 14:00	Slovakia	2-6 (5)	Czech Republic	Frýdek-Místek; Attendance: 350
July 1, 2019; 14:00		Boxscore		Frýdek-Místek; Attendance: 350

July 2, 2019; 11:15	Sweden	2-9	France	Ostrava 2 Attendance: 100
July 2, 2019; 11:15		Boxscore		Ostrava 2 Attendance: 100

July 2, 2019; ~~11:45~~9:00	Czech Republic	10-0 (4)	Belgium	~~Frýdek-Místek~~Ostrava 2 Attendance: 120
July 2, 2019; ~~11:45~~9:00		Boxscore		~~Frýdek-Místek~~Ostrava 2 Attendance: 120

July 2, 2019; ~~12:15~~18:00	Slovakia	15-0 (3)	Lithuania	Rybnik; Attendance: 40
July 2, 2019; ~~12:15~~18:00		Boxscore		Rybnik; Attendance: 40

July 2, 2019; 13:15	Lithuania	0-24 (3)	Sweden	Ostrava 2 Attendance: 55
July 2, 2019; 13:15		Boxscore		Ostrava 2 Attendance: 55

Game originally scheduled: July 1, 2019, 18:00 at Ostrava 2, postponed due to rain

July 2, 2019; 15:15	France	0-9 (5)	Czech Republic	Ostrava 2 Attendance: 250
July 2, 2019; 15:15		Boxscore		Ostrava 2 Attendance: 250

Game originally scheduled: July 1, 2019, 20:45 at Ostrava 1, postponed due to rain

=== Group B ===
#	Team	Pld	W	L	AVG	
1	Italy	5	5	0	1000	Qualified for Semifinal Group
2	Spain	5	4	1	800	Qualified for Semifinal Group
3	Israel	5	3	2	600	Qualified for 9th-16th Place Group
4	Austria	5	2	3	400	Qualified for 9th-16th Place Group
5	Ukraine	5	1	4	200	Qualified for 17th-23rd Place Group
6	Turkey	5	0	5	0	Qualified for 17th-23rd Place Group

June 30, 2019; 9:00	Italy	41-0 (3)	Turkey	Frýdek-Místek; Attendance: 40
June 30, 2019; 9:00		Boxscore		Frýdek-Místek; Attendance: 40

June 30, 2019; 11:15	Spain	8-1 (5)	Austria	Frýdek-Místek; Attendance: 60
June 30, 2019; 11:15		Boxscore		Frýdek-Místek; Attendance: 60

June 30, 2019; 11:15	Ukraine	1-3 (6)	Israel	Zory; Attendance: 85
June 30, 2019; 11:15		Boxscore		Zory; Attendance: 85

June 30, 2019; 15:45	Israel	15-0 (3)	Turkey	Ostrava 2 Attendance: 60
June 30, 2019; 15:45		Boxscore		Ostrava 2 Attendance: 60

June 30, 2019; 16:00	Austria	0-11 (4)	Italy	Frýdek-Místek; Attendance: 50
June 30, 2019; 16:00		Boxscore		Frýdek-Místek; Attendance: 50

June 30, 2019; 18:30	Ukraine	1-10 (5)	Spain	Ostrava 1 Attendance: 200
June 30, 2019; 18:30		Boxscore		Ostrava 1 Attendance: 200

July 1, 2019; 9:30	Israel	2-0	Austria	Ostrava 1 Attendance: 70
July 1, 2019; 9:30		Boxscore		Ostrava 1 Attendance: 70

July 1, 2019; 10:00	Turkey	0-13 (4)	Ukraine	Rybnik; Attendance: 15
July 1, 2019; 10:00		Boxscore		Rybnik; Attendance: 15

July 1, 2019; 14:00	Spain	5-4	Israel	Ostrava 1 Attendance: 150
July 1, 2019; 14:00		Boxscore		Ostrava 1 Attendance: 150

July 1, 2019; 15:45	Italy	15-0 (3)	Ukraine	Ostrava 2 Attendance: 30
July 1, 2019; 15:45		Boxscore		Ostrava 2 Attendance: 30

July 2, 2019; 9:30	Austria	13-3 (4)	Ukraine	Ostrava 1 Attendance: 50
July 2, 2019; 9:30		Boxscore		Ostrava 1 Attendance: 50

July 2, 2019; 11:45	Israel	0-7 (6)	Italy	Frýdek-Místek; Attendance: 120
July 2, 2019; 11:45		Boxscore		Frýdek-Místek; Attendance: 120

July 2, 2019; 14:00	Turkey	0-17 (3)	Spain	Ostrava 1 Attendance: 80
July 2, 2019; 14:00		Boxscore		Ostrava 1 Attendance: 80

July 2, 2019; 16:00	Austria	15-0 (3)	Turkey	Ostrava 1 Attendance: 120
July 2, 2019; 16:00		Boxscore		Ostrava 1 Attendance: 120

Game originally scheduled: July 1, 2019, 16:15 at Frýdek-Místek, postponed due to rain

July 2, 2019; 16:00	Italy	7-0 (6)	Spain	Frýdek-Místek; Attendance: 90
July 2, 2019; 16:00		Boxscore		Frýdek-Místek; Attendance: 90

Game originally scheduled: July 1, 2019, 20:15 at Ostrava 2, postponed due to rain

=== Group C ===
#	Team	Pld	W	L	AVG	
1	Netherlands	5	5	0	1000	Qualified for Semifinal Group
2	Ireland	5	4	1	800	Qualified for Semifinal Group
3	Russia	5	3	2	600	Qualified for 9th-16th Place Group
4	Poland (H)	5	2	3	400	Qualified for 9th-16th Place Group
5	Denmark	5	1	4	200	Qualified for 17th-23rd Place Group
6	Hungary	5	0	5	0	Qualified for 17th-23rd Place Group

June 30, 2019; 9:00	Russia	3-2	Denmark	Rybnik; Attendance: 80
June 30, 2019; 9:00		Boxscore		Rybnik; Attendance: 80

June 30, 2019; 9:00	Netherlands	19-0 (3)	Hungary	Zory; Attendance: 50
June 30, 2019; 9:00		Boxscore		Zory; Attendance: 50

June 30, 2019; 11:15	Ireland	8-0 (5)	Poland	Rybnik; Attendance: 200
June 30, 2019; 11:15		Boxscore		Rybnik; Attendance: 200

June 30, 2019; 13:30	Hungary	0-27 (3)	Russia	Rybnik; Attendance: 100
June 30, 2019; 13:30		Boxscore		Rybnik; Attendance: 100

June 30, 2019; 15:45	Poland	7-0 (5)	Denmark	Rybnik; Attendance: 180
June 30, 2019; 15:45		Boxscore		Rybnik; Attendance: 180

June 30, 2019; 15:45	Ireland	2-13 (5)	Netherlands	Zory; Attendance: 75
June 30, 2019; 15:45		Boxscore		Zory; Attendance: 75

July 1, 2019; 11:45	Denmark	12-5 (5)	Hungary	Frýdek-Místek; Attendance: 75
July 1, 2019; 11:45		Boxscore		Frýdek-Místek; Attendance: 75

July 1, 2019; 12:15	Russia	2-9 (6)	Ireland	Rybnik; Attendance: N/A
July 1, 2019; 12:15		Boxscore		Rybnik; Attendance: N/A

July 1, 2019; 12:15	Netherlands	10-0 (4)	Poland	Zory; Attendance: 150
July 1, 2019; 12:15		Boxscore		Zory; Attendance: 150

July 1, 2019; 18:00	Hungary	0-14 (4)	Poland	Rybnik; Attendance: 100
July 1, 2019; 18:00		Boxscore		Rybnik; Attendance: 100

July 2, 2019; ~~9:00~~9:30	Ireland	14-0 (4)	Hungary	~~Ostrava 2~~Frýdek-Místek; Attendance: 40
July 2, 2019; ~~9:00~~9:30		Boxscore		~~Ostrava 2~~Frýdek-Místek; Attendance: 40

July 2, 2019; 10:00	Denmark	0-11 (5)	Netherlands	Rybnik; Attendance: 20
July 2, 2019; 10:00		Boxscore		Rybnik; Attendance: 20

July 2, 2019; 12:15	Poland	1-2	Russia	Zory; Attendance: 150
July 2, 2019; 12:15		Boxscore		Zory; Attendance: 150

July 2, 2019; 14:00	Denmark	0-15 (4)	Ireland	Ostrava 1 Attendance: 70
July 2, 2019; 14:00		Boxscore		Ostrava 1 Attendance: 70

Game originally scheduled: July 1, 2019, 18:30 at Frýdek-Místek, postponed due to rain

July 2, 2019; 14:15	Netherlands	6-3	Russia	Ostrava 1 Attendance: 30
July 2, 2019; 14:15		Boxscore		Ostrava 1 Attendance: 30

Game originally scheduled: July 1, 2019, 18:30 at Ostrava 1, postponed due to rain

=== Group D ===
#	Team	Pld	W	L	AVG	
1	Great Britain	4	4	0	1000	Qualified for Semifinal Group
2	Greece	4	3	1	750	Qualified for Semifinal Group
3	Germany	4	2	2	500	Qualified for 9th-16th Place Group
4	Switzerland	4	1	3	250	Qualified for 9th-16th Place Group
5	Croatia	4	0	4	0	Qualified for 17th-23rd Place Group

June 30, 2019; 9:00	Switzerland	1-15 (4)	Germany	Ostrava 1 Attendance: 50
June 30, 2019; 9:00		Boxscore		Ostrava 1 Attendance: 50

June 30, 2019; 9:00	Great Britain	12-5 (6)	Greece	Ostrava 2 Attendance: 50
June 30, 2019; 9:00		Boxscore		Ostrava 2 Attendance: 50

June 30, 2019; 13:30	Greece	15-4 (4)	Switzerland	Ostrava 2 Attendance: 20
June 30, 2019; 13:30		Boxscore		Ostrava 2 Attendance: 20

June 30, 2019; 13:30	Germany	10-0 (4)	Croatia	Frýdek-Místek; Attendance: 30
June 30, 2019; 13:30		Boxscore		Frýdek-Místek; Attendance: 30

July 1, 2019; 10:00	Germany	1-15 (5)	Great Britain	Zory; Attendance: 50
July 1, 2019; 10:00		Boxscore		Zory; Attendance: 50

July 1, 2019; 11:45	Croatia	0-2	Switzerland	Ostrava 1 Attendance: 50
July 1, 2019; 11:45		Boxscore		Ostrava 1 Attendance: 50

July 1, 2019; 15:45	Greece	6-4	Germany	Rybnik; Attendance: 50
July 1, 2019; 15:45		Boxscore		Rybnik; Attendance: 50

July 1, 2019; 16:15	Great Britain	15-0 (3)	Croatia	Ostrava 1 Attendance: 150
July 1, 2019; 16:15		Boxscore		Ostrava 1 Attendance: 150

July 2, 2019; 10:00	Croatia	0-7 (5)	Greece	Zory; Attendance: 75
July 2, 2019; 10:00		Boxscore		Zory; Attendance: 75

July 2, 2019; ~~9:30~~14:00	Switzerland	1-17 (4)	Great Britain	Frýdek-Místek; Attendance: N/A
July 2, 2019; ~~9:30~~14:00		Boxscore		Frýdek-Místek; Attendance: N/A

== Semifinal Round ==
=== Group E ===
#	Team	Pld	W	L	AVG	
1	Great Britain	3	3	0	1000	Qualified for Finals and Africa/Europe 2020 Olympic Qualification
2	Czech Republic	3	2	1	666	Qualified for Finals and Africa/Europe 2020 Olympic Qualification
3	Spain	3	1	2	333	Qualified for Finals and Africa/Europe 2020 Olympic Qualification
4	Ireland	3	0	3	0	7th Place Game

July 2, 2019; 18:30	Great Britain	8-0 (5)	Ireland	Ostrava 1 Attendance: 250
July 2, 2019; 18:30		Boxscore		Ostrava 1 Attendance: 250

July 2, 2019; 20:45	Czech Republic	10-3 (6)	Spain	Ostrava 1 Attendance: 350
July 2, 2019; 20:45		Boxscore		Ostrava 1 Attendance: 350

July 3, 2019; 11:15	Ireland	6-13 (6)	Spain	Ostrava 2 Attendance: 50
July 3, 2019; 11:15		Boxscore		Ostrava 2 Attendance: 50

July 3, 2019; 11:45	Czech Republic	0-2 (8)	Great Britain	Ostrava 1 Attendance: 200
July 3, 2019; 11:45		Boxscore		Ostrava 1 Attendance: 200

July 3, 2019; 18:00	Great Britain	7-0 (5)	Spain	Ostrava 2 Attendance: 20
July 3, 2019; 18:00		Boxscore		Ostrava 2 Attendance: 20

July 3, 2019; 20:45	Czech Republic	4-3	Ireland	Ostrava 1 Attendance: 350
July 3, 2019; 20:45		Boxscore		Ostrava 1 Attendance: 350

=== Group F ===
#	Team	Pld	W	L	AVG	
1	Netherlands	3	3	0	1000	Qualified for Finals and Africa/Europe 2020 Olympic Qualification
2	Italy	3	2	1	666	Qualified for Finals and Africa/Europe 2020 Olympic Qualification
3	France	3	1	2	333	Qualified for Finals and Africa/Europe 2020 Olympic Qualification
4	Greece	3	0	3	0	7th Place Game

July 2, 2019; 18:00	France	7-6	Greece	Ostrava 2 Attendance: 85
July 2, 2019; 18:00		Boxscore		Ostrava 2 Attendance: 85

July 2, 2019; 20:15	Italy	2-6	Netherlands	Ostrava 2 Attendance: N/A
July 2, 2019; 20:15		Boxscore		Ostrava 2 Attendance: N/A

July 3, 2019; 13:30	Netherlands	5-1	Greece	Ostrava 2 Attendance: 130
July 3, 2019; 13:30		Boxscore		Ostrava 2 Attendance: 130

July 3, 2019; 14:00	Italy	7-0 (5)	France	Ostrava 1 Attendance: 75
July 3, 2019; 14:00		Boxscore		Ostrava 1 Attendance: 75

July 3, 2019; 18:30	Netherlands	7-0 (5)	France	Ostrava 1 Attendance: 200
July 3, 2019; 18:30		Boxscore		Ostrava 1 Attendance: 200

July 3, 2019; 20:15	Italy	11-0 (4)	Greece	Ostrava 2 Attendance: 25
July 3, 2019; 20:15		Boxscore		Ostrava 2 Attendance: 25

=== 7th Place Game ===
July 5, 2019; 14:00	Ireland	7-10	Greece	Ostrava 1 Attendance: 120
July 5, 2019; 14:00		Boxscore		Ostrava 1 Attendance: 120

== Final Round ==
=== Group X ===
#	Team	Pld	W	L	AVG	
1	Netherlands	5	5	0	1000	Qualified for Final Game
2	Italy	5	4	1	800	Qualified for Final Game
3	Great Britain	5	3	2	600	Qualified for Bronze Medal Game
4	Czech Republic	5	2	3	400	Qualified for Bronze Medal Game
5	Spain	5	1	4	200	
6	France	5	0	5	0	

July 4, 2019; 11:45	Netherlands	10-0	Spain	Ostrava 1 Attendance: 100
July 4, 2019; 11:45		Boxscore		Ostrava 1 Attendance: 100

July 4, 2019; 13:30	Great Britain	10-3	France	Ostrava 2 Attendance: 150
July 4, 2019; 13:30		Boxscore		Ostrava 2 Attendance: 150

July 4, 2019; 14:00	Czech Republic	0-10	Italy	Ostrava 1 Attendance: 250
July 4, 2019; 14:00		Boxscore		Ostrava 1 Attendance: 250

July 4, 2019; 18:30	Czech Republic	7-6	France	Ostrava 1 Attendance: 400
July 4, 2019; 18:30		Boxscore		Ostrava 1 Attendance: 400

July 4, 2019; 20:15	Italy	5-1	Spain	Ostrava 2 Attendance: 65
July 4, 2019; 20:15		Boxscore		Ostrava 2 Attendance: 65

July 4, 2019; 20:45	Great Britain	1-8	Netherlands	Ostrava 1 Attendance: 250
July 4, 2019; 20:45		Boxscore		Ostrava 1 Attendance: 250

July 5, 2019; 16:15	Spain	4-3	France	Ostrava 1 Attendance: 300
July 5, 2019; 16:15		Boxscore		Ostrava 1 Attendance: 300

July 5, 2019; 18:30	Great Britain	0-7 (5)	Italy	Ostrava 1 Attendance: 400
July 5, 2019; 18:30		Boxscore		Ostrava 1 Attendance: 400

July 5, 2019; 20:45	Netherlands	6-2	Czech Republic	Ostrava 1 Attendance: 500
July 5, 2019; 20:45		Boxscore		Ostrava 1 Attendance: 500

=== Bronze ===
July 6, 2019; 15:30	Great Britain	5-1	Czech Republic	Ostrava 1 Attendance: 550
July 6, 2019; 15:30		Boxscore		Ostrava 1 Attendance: 550

=== Final ===
July 6, 2019; 18:00	Netherlands	2-3	Italy	Ostrava 1 Attendance: 600
July 6, 2019; 18:00		Boxscore		Ostrava 1 Attendance: 600

== Consolidation Round 9th-16th Place ==
=== Group G ===
#	Team	Pld	W	L	AVG	
1	Germany	3	3	0	1000	9th Place Game
2	Poland	3	2	1	666	11th Place Game
3	Austria	3	1	2	333	13th Place Game
4	Sweden	3	0	3	0	15th Place Game

July 2, 2019; 18:00	Germany	6-3	Poland	Frýdek-Místek; Attendance: 90
July 2, 2019; 18:00		Boxscore		Frýdek-Místek; Attendance: 90

July 3, 2019; 9:30	Sweden	0-7 (5)	Austria	Ostrava 1 Attendance: 50
July 3, 2019; 9:30		Boxscore		Ostrava 1 Attendance: 50

July 3, 2019; 14:00	Austria	4-9	Poland	Frýdek-Místek; Attendance: 35
July 3, 2019; 14:00		Boxscore		Frýdek-Místek; Attendance: 35

July 3, 2019; 15:45	Germany	10-3 (5)	Sweden	Ostrava 2 Attendance: 230
July 3, 2019; 15:45		Boxscore		Ostrava 2 Attendance: 230

July 4, 2019; 14:00	Germany	3-2	Austria	Frýdek-Místek; Attendance: 60
July 4, 2019; 14:00		Boxscore		Frýdek-Místek; Attendance: 60

July 4, 2019; 16:15	Sweden	0-2	Poland	Frýdek-Místek; Attendance: 60
July 4, 2019; 16:15		Boxscore		Frýdek-Místek; Attendance: 60

=== Group H ===
#	Team	Pld	W	L	AVG	
1	Israel	3	3	0	1000	9th Place Game
2	Russia	3	2	1	666	11th Place Game
3	Belgium	3	1	2	333	13th Place Game
4	Switzerland	3	0	3	0	15th Place Game

July 3, 2019; 9:00	Israel	4-2	Russia	Ostrava 2 Attendance: 25
July 3, 2019; 9:00		Boxscore		Ostrava 2 Attendance: 25

July 3, 2019; 11:45	Switzerland	3-6	Belgium	Frýdek-Místek; Attendance: 50
July 3, 2019; 11:45		Boxscore		Frýdek-Místek; Attendance: 50

July 3, 2019; 16:15	Russia	11-4 (6)	Belgium	Ostrava 1 Attendance: 150
July 3, 2019; 16:15		Boxscore		Ostrava 1 Attendance: 150

July 4, 2019; 9:00	Israel	8-1 (6)	Belgium	Ostrava 2 Attendance: 50
July 4, 2019; 9:00		Boxscore		Ostrava 2 Attendance: 50

July 4, 2019; 9:30	Russia	5-3	Switzerland	Ostrava 1 Attendance: 100
July 4, 2019; 9:30		Boxscore		Ostrava 1 Attendance: 100

July 4, 2019; 15:45	Israel	7-0 (5)	Switzerland	Ostrava 2 Attendance: 60
July 4, 2019; 15:45		Boxscore		Ostrava 2 Attendance: 60

=== 9th Place Game ===
July 6, 2019; 13:00	Germany	2-4	Israel	Ostrava 1 Attendance: 450
July 6, 2019; 13:00		Boxscore		Ostrava 1 Attendance: 450

=== 11th Place Game ===
July 5, 2019; 11:45	Poland	3-6	Russia	Ostrava 1 Attendance: 250
July 5, 2019; 11:45		Boxscore		Ostrava 1 Attendance: 250

=== 13th Place Game ===
July 5, 2019; 9:30	Belgium	5-7 (8)	Austria	Ostrava 1 Attendance: 120
July 5, 2019; 9:30		Boxscore		Ostrava 1 Attendance: 120

=== 15th Place Game ===
July 5, 2019; 13:30	Switzerland	3-8	Sweden	Ostrava 2 Attendance: 40
July 5, 2019; 13:30		Boxscore		Ostrava 2 Attendance: 40

== Consolidation Round 17th-23rd Place ==
=== Group I ===
#	Team	Pld	W	L	AVG
17	Croatia	6	6	0	1000
18	Ukraine	6	5	1	833
19	Slovakia	6	4	2	666
20	Denmark	6	3	3	500
21	Lithuania	6	2	4	333
22	Hungary	6	1	5	166
23	Turkey	6	0	6	0

July 3, 2019; 9:30	Slovakia	11-1 (4)	Turkey	Rybnik; Attendance: 50
July 3, 2019; 9:30		Boxscore		Rybnik; Attendance: 50

July 3, 2019; 9:30	Lithuania	13-6 (6)	Hungary	Zory; Attendance: 30
July 3, 2019; 9:30		Boxscore		Zory; Attendance: 30

July 3, 2019; 11:45	Ukraine	0-10 (5)	Croatia	Rybnik; Attendance: 50
July 3, 2019; 11:45		Boxscore		Rybnik; Attendance: 50

July 3, 2019; 14:00	Slovakia	7-6	Denmark	Rybnik; Attendance: 60
July 3, 2019; 14:00		Boxscore		Rybnik; Attendance: 60

July 3, 2019; 16:00	Ukraine	13-0 (4)	Hungary	Zory; Attendance: 30
July 3, 2019; 16:00		Boxscore		Zory; Attendance: 30

July 3, 2019; 16:15	Croatia	11-1 (4)	Lithuania	Rybnik; Attendance: 90
July 3, 2019; 16:15		Boxscore		Rybnik; Attendance: 90

July 3, 2019; 18:15	Denmark	13-2 (4)	Turkey	Zory; Attendance: 20
July 3, 2019; 18:15		Boxscore		Zory; Attendance: 20

July 4, 2019; 9:30	Croatia	13-0 (4)	Hungary	Frýdek-Místek; Attendance: 40
July 4, 2019; 9:30		Boxscore		Frýdek-Místek; Attendance: 40

July 4, 2019; 11:15	Ukraine	6-0	Denmark	Ostrava 2 Attendance: N/A
July 4, 2019; 11:15		Boxscore		Ostrava 2 Attendance: N/A

July 4, 2019; 11:45	Lithuania	19-8 (4)	Turkey	Frýdek-Místek; Attendance: 30
July 4, 2019; 11:45		Boxscore		Frýdek-Místek; Attendance: 30

July 4, 2019; 16:15	Slovakia	5-7	Ukraine	Ostrava 1 Attendance: 200
July 4, 2019; 16:15		Boxscore		Ostrava 1 Attendance: 200

July 4, 2019; 18:00	Croatia	13-0 (4)	Turkey	Ostrava 2 Attendance: 25
July 4, 2019; 18:00		Boxscore		Ostrava 2 Attendance: 25

July 4, 2019; 18:30	Denmark	15-10	Lithuania	Frýdek-Místek; Attendance: 70
July 4, 2019; 18:30		Boxscore		Frýdek-Místek; Attendance: 70

July 5, 2019; 9:00	Denmark	2-8	Croatia	Ostrava 2 Attendance: 40
July 5, 2019; 9:00		Boxscore		Ostrava 2 Attendance: 40

July 5, 2019; 11:15	Slovakia	17-0 (3)	Hungary	Ostrava 2 Attendance: 40
July 5, 2019; 11:15		Boxscore		Ostrava 2 Attendance: 40

July 5, 2019; 15:45	Croatia	5-0	Slovakia	Ostrava 2 Attendance: 130
July 5, 2019; 15:45		Boxscore		Ostrava 2 Attendance: 130

July 5, 2019; 18:00	Hungary	8-2	Turkey	Ostrava 2 Attendance: 20
July 5, 2019; 18:00		Boxscore		Ostrava 2 Attendance: 20

July 5, 2019; 20:15	Ukraine	10-0 (4)	Lithuania	Ostrava 2 Attendance: 20
July 5, 2019; 20:15		Boxscore		Ostrava 2 Attendance: 20

== Final standings ==
#	Teams	Record	
Gold medal	Italy	11-1	Qualified for Africa/Europe 2020 Olympic Qualification.
Silver medal	Netherlands	11-1	Qualified for Africa/Europe 2020 Olympic Qualification.
Bronze medal	Great Britain	9-2	Qualified for Africa/Europe 2020 Olympic Qualification.
4	Czech Republic	8-4	Qualified for Africa/Europe 2020 Olympic Qualification.
5	Spain	6-5	Qualified for Africa/Europe 2020 Olympic Qualification.
6	France	5-6	Qualified for Africa/Europe 2020 Olympic Qualification.
Failed To Qualify to Final Round
7	Greece	4-4	
8	Ireland	4-5	
Eliminated in preliminary round
9	Israel	7-2	
10	Germany	5-3	
11	Russia	6-3	
12	Poland	4-5	
13	Austria	5-4	
14	Belgium	4-5	
15	Sweden	3-6	
16	Switzerland	1-7	
Eliminated in preliminary round
17	Croatia	6-4	
18	Ukraine	5-5	
19	Slovakia	4-6	
20	Denmark	3-7	
21	Lithuania	2-8	
22	Hungary	1-9	
23	Turkey	0-10	
