= 2017 ESF Women's Championship =

Tournament details
- Host country: Italy
- Dates: 25 June - 1 July
- Teams: 23
- Defending champions: Italy (2015)

Final positions
- Champions: Netherlands (10th title)
- Runner-up: Italy
- Third place: Great Britain
- Fourth place: Czech Republic

The 2017 ESF Women's Championship was an international European softball competition that was held in Bollate, Italy from 25 June to 1 July 2017.

== Results ==
=== Group A ===
Team	Pld	W	L	AVG
Italy	4	4	0	1000
Spain	4	3	1	750
France	4	2	2	500
Croatia	4	1	3	250
Switzerland	4	0	4	0

=== Group B ===
Team	Pld	W	L	AVG
Netherlands	5	5	0	1000
Greece	5	4	1	800
Germany	5	3	2	600
Ireland	5	2	3	400
Slovakia	5	1	4	200
Lithuania	5	0	5	0

=== Group C ===
Team	Pld	W	L	AVG
Czech Republic	5	5	0	1000
Sweden	5	4	1	800
Austria	5	3	2	600
Poland	5	2	3	400
Hungary	5	1	4	200
Israel	5	0	5	0

=== Group D ===
Team	Pld	W	L	AVG
Great Britain	5	5	0	1000
Russia	5	4	1	800
Belgium	5	3	2	600
Ukraine	5	2	3	400
Bulgaria	5	1	4	200
Denmark	5	0	5	0

=== Medal Round ===
Semifinals
W3	Italy	0
W4	Netherlands	1
W5	Great Britain	4
W6	Czech Republic	1

Bronze Medal
L7	Italy	8
W8	Great Britain	1

Gold Medal
W7	Netherlands	7
W9	Italy	1

== Final standings ==
Qualified for 2018 Women's Softball World Championship.
Received invitation to 2018 Women's Softball World Championship.

#	Teams
1	Netherlands
2	Italy
3	Great Britain
4	Czech Republic
5	Russia
6	Greece
7	Spain
8	Sweden
9	Austria
10	France
11	Germany
12	Poland
13	Ukraine
14	Belgium
15	Ireland
16	Croatia
17	Slovakia
18	Switzerland
19	Bulgaria
20	Denmark
21	Israel
22	Hungary
23	Lithuania
