= 2013 ESF Women's Championship =

Tournament details
- Host country: Czech Republic
- Dates: 7–13 July
- Teams: 19
- Defending champions: Netherlands (2011)

Final positions
- Champions: Netherlands (9th title)
- Runner-up: Italy
- Third place: Czech Republic
- Fourth place: Russia

Tournament statistics
- Games played: 63

The 2013 ESF Women's Championship was an international European softball competition that was held in Prague, Czech Republic from July 7 to July 13, 2013. Prague hosted Championships for the 4th time.

== Results ==
=== Group A ===
Team	Pld	W	L	AVG
Czech Republic	4	4	0	1000
Austria	4	3	1	750
Belgium	4	2	2	500
Switzerland	4	1	3	250
Hungary	4	0	4	0

=== Group B ===
Team	Pld	W	L	AVG
Netherlands	3	3	0	1000
Spain	3	2	1	667
Croatia	3	1	2	333
Slovakia	3	0	3	0

=== Group C ===
Team	Pld	W	L	AVG
Russia	4	4	0	1000
Great Britain	4	3	1	750
Germany	4	2	2	500
Denmark	4	1	3	250
Israel	4	0	4	0

=== Group D ===
Team	Pld	W	L	AVG
Italy	4	4	0	1000
Sweden	4	3	1	750
France	4	1	3	250
Poland	4	1	3	250
Ukraine	4	1	3	250

=== Medal Round ===
Semifinals
W3	Netherlands	7
W4	Italy	3
W5	Czech Republic	8
W6	Russia	3

Bronze Medal
L7	Italy	10
W8	Czech Republic	1

Gold Medal
W7	Netherlands	3
W9	Italy	0

== Final standings ==
Host nation of 2014 Women's Softball World Championship.
Qualified for 2014 Women's Softball World Championship.
Received invitation to 2014 Women's Softball World Championship.

#	Teams
1	Netherlands
2	Italy
3	Czech Republic
4	Russia
5	Great Britain
6	Austria
7	Sweden
8	Spain
9	Germany
10	Slovakia
11	Belgium
12	Ukraine
13	Denmark
14	Switzerland
15	Poland
16	Croatia
17	Israel
18	France
19	Hungary
