= 2024 Women's Softball European Championship =

Tournament details
- Host country: Netherlands
- Dates: 1–7 September 2024
- Teams: 22
- Defending champions: Netherlands (2022)

Final positions
- Champions: Italy (13th title)
- Runner-up: Great Britain
- Third place: Netherlands
- Fourth place: Czech Republic

Tournament statistics
- Games played: 88
- Attendance: 17,516 (199 per game)
- Last updated on 7 September 2024

The 2024 Women's Softball European Championship was an international European softball competition held in Utrecht, Netherlands from 1 to 7 September 2024. This was the 24th edition of the Women's Softball European Championship.

== Opening round ==
=== Group A ===
Pos	Team	Pld	W	L	RF	RA	RD	PCT	GB	Qualification
1	France	2	2	0	19	1	+18	1.000	—	Advance to Group X
2	Switzerland	2	1	1	8	17	−9	.500	1	Advance to 13–16th places classification
3	Denmark	2	0	2	8	17	−9	.000	2	Advance to 17–22nd places classification

Source: WBSC

September 1, 2024; 09:00	France	9–1 (5)	Denmark	Sportpark de Paperclip - Field 2, Utrecht; Attendance: 51
September 1, 2024; 09:00		Boxscore		Sportpark de Paperclip - Field 2, Utrecht; Attendance: 51

September 1, 2024; 14:00	Switzerland	0–10 (4)	France	Sportpark Weltevreden, De Bilt; Attendance: 63
September 1, 2024; 14:00		Boxscore		Sportpark Weltevreden, De Bilt; Attendance: 63

September 2, 2024; 10:00	Denmark	7–8	Switzerland	Sportpark Weltevreden, De Bilt; Attendance: 55
September 2, 2024; 10:00		Boxscore		Sportpark Weltevreden, De Bilt; Attendance: 55

=== Group B ===
Pos	Team	Pld	W	L	RF	RA	RD	PCT	GB	Qualification
1	Belgium	2	2	0	20	1	+19	1.000	—	Advance to Group Y
2	Poland	2	1	1	8	11	−3	.500	1	Advance to 13–16th places classification
3	Malta	2	0	2	1	17	−16	.000	2	Advance to 17–22nd places classification

Source: WBSC

September 1, 2024; 11:30	Belgium	10–1 (5)	Poland	Sportpark Weltevreden, De Bilt; Attendance: 73
September 1, 2024; 11:30		Boxscore		Sportpark Weltevreden, De Bilt; Attendance: 73

September 1, 2024; 16:30	Malta	0–10 (4)	Belgium	Sportpark Weltevreden, De Bilt; Attendance: 77
September 1, 2024; 16:30		Boxscore		Sportpark Weltevreden, De Bilt; Attendance: 77

September 2, 2024; 12:00	Poland	7–1	Malta	Sportpark de Paperclip - Field 2, Utrecht; Attendance: 73
September 2, 2024; 12:00		Boxscore		Sportpark de Paperclip - Field 2, Utrecht; Attendance: 73

=== Group C ===
Pos	Team	Pld	W	L	RF	RA	RD	PCT	GB	Qualification
1	Ukraine	3	3	0	29	7	+22	1.000	—	Advance to Group Y
2	Slovakia	3	2	1	26	10	+16	.667	1	Advance to 13–16th places classification
3	Bulgaria	3	1	2	6	20	−14	.333	2	Advance to 17–22nd places classification
4	Finland	3	0	3	0	24	−24	.000	3	Advance to 17–22nd places classification

Source: WBSC

September 1, 2024; 09:00	Slovakia	11–0 (5)	Bulgaria	Sportpark Weltevreden, De Bilt; Attendance: 53
September 1, 2024; 09:00		Boxscore		Sportpark Weltevreden, De Bilt; Attendance: 53

September 1, 2024; 09:00	Finland	0–10 (4)	Ukraine	Sportpark Galecopperzoom, Nieuwegein; Attendance: 50
September 1, 2024; 09:00		Boxscore		Sportpark Galecopperzoom, Nieuwegein; Attendance: 50

September 1, 2024; 14:00	Ukraine	10–5	Slovakia	Sportpark de Paperclip - Field 2, Utrecht; Attendance: 53
September 1, 2024; 14:00		Boxscore		Sportpark de Paperclip - Field 2, Utrecht; Attendance: 53

September 1, 2024; 14:00	Bulgaria	4–0	Finland	Sportpark Galecopperzoom, Nieuwegein; Attendance: 51
September 1, 2024; 14:00		Boxscore		Sportpark Galecopperzoom, Nieuwegein; Attendance: 51

September 2, 2024; 10:00	Bulgaria	2–9 (5)	Ukraine	Sportpark Galecopperzoom, Nieuwegein; Attendance: 55
September 2, 2024; 10:00		Boxscore		Sportpark Galecopperzoom, Nieuwegein; Attendance: 55

September 2, 2024; 12:30	Finland	0–10 (4)	Slovakia	Sportpark Galecopperzoom, Nieuwegein; Attendance: 52
September 2, 2024; 12:30		Boxscore		Sportpark Galecopperzoom, Nieuwegein; Attendance: 52

=== Group D ===
Pos	Team	Pld	W	L	RF	RA	RD	PCT	GB	Qualification
1	Austria	3	3	0	30	1	+29	1.000	—	Advance to Group X
2	Sweden	3	2	1	14	10	+4	.667	1	Advance to 13–16th places classification
3	Croatia	3	1	2	15	12	+3	.333	2	Advance to 17–22nd places classification
4	Hungary	3	0	3	0	36	−36	.000	3	Advance to 17–22nd places classification

Source: WBSC

September 1, 2024; 11:30	Croatia	14–0 (4)	Hungary	Sportpark de Paperclip - Field 2, Utrecht; Attendance: 65
September 1, 2024; 11:30		Boxscore		Sportpark de Paperclip - Field 2, Utrecht; Attendance: 65

September 1, 2024; 11:30	Sweden	0–10 (4)	Austria	Sportpark Galecopperzoom, Nieuwegein; Attendance: 50
September 1, 2024; 11:30		Boxscore		Sportpark Galecopperzoom, Nieuwegein; Attendance: 50

September 1, 2024; 16:30	Hungary	0–12 (4)	Austria	Sportpark de Paperclip - Field 2, Utrecht; Attendance: 51
September 1, 2024; 16:30		Boxscore		Sportpark de Paperclip - Field 2, Utrecht; Attendance: 51

September 1, 2024; 16:30	Sweden	4–0	Croatia	Sportpark Galecopperzoom, Nieuwegein; Attendance: 60
September 1, 2024; 16:30		Boxscore		Sportpark Galecopperzoom, Nieuwegein; Attendance: 60

September 2, 2024; 09:30	Hungary	0–10 (4)	Sweden	Sportpark de Paperclip - Field 2, Utrecht; Attendance: 31
September 2, 2024; 09:30		Boxscore		Sportpark de Paperclip - Field 2, Utrecht; Attendance: 31

September 2, 2024; 12:30	Austria	8–1 (5)	Croatia	Sportpark Weltevreden, De Bilt; Attendance: 55
September 2, 2024; 12:30		Boxscore		Sportpark Weltevreden, De Bilt; Attendance: 55

=== Group X ===
Pos	Team	Pld	W	L	RF	RA	RD	PCT	GB	Qualification
1	Netherlands (H)	5	5	0	34	7	+27	1.000	—	Advance to Group Z
2	Czech Republic	5	4	1	29	6	+23	.800	1	Advance to Group Z
3	Spain	5	3	2	19	18	+1	.600	2	Advance to Group Z
4	France	5	2	3	20	18	+2	.400	3	Advance to Group E
5	Germany	5	1	4	8	32	−24	.200	4	Advance to Group E
6	Austria	5	0	5	0	29	−29	.000	5	Advance to Group E

Source: WBSC
(H) Hosts

September 1, 2024; 17:30	Spain	3–10 (5)	Netherlands	Sportpark de Paperclip, Utrecht; Attendance: 1,335
September 1, 2024; 17:30		Boxscore		Sportpark de Paperclip, Utrecht; Attendance: 1,335

September 1, 2024; 20:30	Germany	3–11 (5)	Czech Republic	Sportpark de Paperclip, Utrecht; Attendance: 1,247
September 1, 2024; 20:30		Boxscore		Sportpark de Paperclip, Utrecht; Attendance: 1,247

September 2, 2024; 14:30	Germany	2–9 (5)	France	Sportpark de Paperclip - Field 2, Utrecht; Attendance: 87
September 2, 2024; 14:30		Boxscore		Sportpark de Paperclip - Field 2, Utrecht; Attendance: 87

September 2, 2024; 15:00	Czech Republic	5–1	Spain	Sportpark de Paperclip, Utrecht; Attendance: 101
September 2, 2024; 15:00		Boxscore		Sportpark de Paperclip, Utrecht; Attendance: 101

September 2, 2024; 20:00	Czech Republic	1–2	Netherlands	Sportpark de Paperclip, Utrecht; Attendance: 1,250
September 2, 2024; 20:00		Boxscore		Sportpark de Paperclip, Utrecht; Attendance: 1,250

September 2, 2024; 20:00	France	7–0 (6)	Austria	Sportpark Weltevreden, De Bilt; Attendance: 59
September 2, 2024; 20:00		Boxscore		Sportpark Weltevreden, De Bilt; Attendance: 59

September 3, 2024; 12:30	Spain	5–2 (8)	Germany	Sportpark Weltevreden, De Bilt; Attendance: 82
September 3, 2024; 12:30		Boxscore		Sportpark Weltevreden, De Bilt; Attendance: 82

September 3, 2024; 14:30	Czech Republic	5–0	France	Sportpark de Paperclip - Field 2, Utrecht; Attendance: 50
September 3, 2024; 14:30		Boxscore		Sportpark de Paperclip - Field 2, Utrecht; Attendance: 50

September 3, 2024; 15:00	Netherlands	7–0 (5)	Austria	Sportpark de Paperclip, Utrecht; Attendance: 255
September 3, 2024; 15:00		Boxscore		Sportpark de Paperclip, Utrecht; Attendance: 255

September 3, 2024; 20:00	France	3–8	Netherlands	Sportpark Weltevreden, De Bilt; Attendance: 293
September 3, 2024; 20:00		Boxscore		Sportpark Weltevreden, De Bilt; Attendance: 293

September 4, 2024; 10:00	Spain	7–0	Austria	Sportpark de Paperclip, Utrecht; Attendance: 53
September 4, 2024; 10:00		Boxscore		Sportpark de Paperclip, Utrecht; Attendance: 53

September 4, 2024; 12:30	Austria	0–1	Germany	Sportpark de Paperclip, Utrecht; Attendance: 58
September 4, 2024; 12:30		Boxscore		Sportpark de Paperclip, Utrecht; Attendance: 58

September 4, 2024; 15:00	France	1–3	Spain	Sportpark de Paperclip, Utrecht; Attendance: 115
September 4, 2024; 15:00		Boxscore		Sportpark de Paperclip, Utrecht; Attendance: 115

September 4, 2024; 17:30	Austria	0–7	Czech Republic	Sportpark de Paperclip, Utrecht; Attendance: 54
September 4, 2024; 17:30		Boxscore		Sportpark de Paperclip, Utrecht; Attendance: 54

September 4, 2024; 20:00	Netherlands	7–0 (5)	Germany	Sportpark Galecopperzoom, Nieuwegein; Attendance: 536
September 4, 2024; 20:00		Boxscore		Sportpark Galecopperzoom, Nieuwegein; Attendance: 536

=== Group Y ===
Pos	Team	Pld	W	L	RF	RA	RD	PCT	GB	Qualification
1	Italy	5	5	0	39	3	+36	1.000	—	Advance to Group Z
2	Great Britain	5	4	1	36	9	+27	.800	1	Advance to Group Z
3	Greece	5	2	3	21	24	−3	.400	3	Advance to Group Z
4	Israel	5	2	3	17	16	+1	.400	3	Advance to Group E
5	Ukraine	5	2	3	17	37	−20	.400	3	Advance to Group E
6	Belgium	5	0	5	8	49	−41	.000	5	Advance to Group E

Source: WBSC

September 1, 2024; 12:30	Israel	2–7	Greece	Sportpark de Paperclip, Utrecht; Attendance: 112
September 1, 2024; 12:30		Boxscore		Sportpark de Paperclip, Utrecht; Attendance: 112

September 1, 2024; 15:00	Great Britain	0–4	Italy	Sportpark de Paperclip, Utrecht; Attendance: 341
September 1, 2024; 15:00		Boxscore		Sportpark de Paperclip, Utrecht; Attendance: 341

September 2, 2024; 10:00	Italy	5–3	Israel	Sportpark de Paperclip, Utrecht; Attendance: 56
September 2, 2024; 10:00		Boxscore		Sportpark de Paperclip, Utrecht; Attendance: 56

September 2, 2024; 12:30	Great Britain	8–1 (6)	Greece	Sportpark de Paperclip, Utrecht; Attendance: 75
September 2, 2024; 12:30		Boxscore		Sportpark de Paperclip, Utrecht; Attendance: 75

September 2, 2024; 17:00	Israel	3–4	Great Britain	Sportpark de Paperclip - Field 2, Utrecht; Attendance: 79
September 2, 2024; 17:00		Boxscore		Sportpark de Paperclip - Field 2, Utrecht; Attendance: 79

September 2, 2024; 20:00	Greece	0–7	Italy	Sportpark de Paperclip, Utrecht; Attendance: 200
September 2, 2024; 20:00		Boxscore		Sportpark de Paperclip, Utrecht; Attendance: 200

September 2, 2024; 20:00	Belgium	7–10	Ukraine	Sportpark Galecopperzoom, Nieuwegein; Attendance: 57
September 2, 2024; 20:00		Boxscore		Sportpark Galecopperzoom, Nieuwegein; Attendance: 57

September 3, 2024; 12:00	Belgium	0–7 (5)	Israel	Sportpark de Paperclip - Field 2, Utrecht; Attendance: 66
September 3, 2024; 12:00		Boxscore		Sportpark de Paperclip - Field 2, Utrecht; Attendance: 66

September 3, 2024; 12:30	Ukraine	0–7 (6)	Italy	Sportpark de Paperclip, Utrecht
September 3, 2024; 12:30		Boxscore		Sportpark de Paperclip, Utrecht

September 3, 2024; 17:00	Greece	7–0 (5)	Belgium	Sportpark de Paperclip - Field 2, Utrecht; Attendance: 55
September 3, 2024; 17:00		Boxscore		Sportpark de Paperclip - Field 2, Utrecht; Attendance: 55

September 3, 2024; 17:30	Great Britain	15–0 (4)	Ukraine	Sportpark de Paperclip, Utrecht; Attendance: 67
September 3, 2024; 17:30		Boxscore		Sportpark de Paperclip, Utrecht; Attendance: 67

September 4, 2024; 12:00	Israel	2–0	Ukraine	Sportpark de Paperclip - Field 2, Utrecht; Attendance: 51
September 4, 2024; 12:00		Boxscore		Sportpark de Paperclip - Field 2, Utrecht; Attendance: 51

September 4, 2024; 14:30	Belgium	1–9 (5)	Great Britain	Sportpark de Paperclip - Field 2, Utrecht; Attendance: 67
September 4, 2024; 14:30		Boxscore		Sportpark de Paperclip - Field 2, Utrecht; Attendance: 67

September 4, 2024; 17:30	Ukraine	7–6	Greece	Sportpark Galecopperzoom, Nieuwegein; Attendance: 173
September 4, 2024; 17:30		Boxscore		Sportpark Galecopperzoom, Nieuwegein; Attendance: 173

September 4, 2024; 20:00	Italy	16–0 (4)	Belgium	Sportpark de Paperclip - Field 2, Utrecht; Attendance: 126
September 4, 2024; 20:00		Boxscore		Sportpark de Paperclip - Field 2, Utrecht; Attendance: 126

== 17th–22nd places classification ==
=== Group G ===
Matches already played between the teams of group C (C3 and C4), and Group D (D3 and D4) are carried over.

Pos	Team	Pld	W	L	RF	RA	RD	PCT	GB	Qualification
1	Croatia	5	5	0	46	7	+39	1.000	—	Rank 17
2	Denmark	5	4	1	34	17	+17	.800	1	Rank 18
3	Malta	5	3	2	17	16	+1	.600	2	Rank 19
4	Bulgaria	5	2	3	14	20	−6	.400	3	Rank 20
5	Finland	5	1	4	21	30	−9	.200	4	Rank 21
6	Hungary	5	0	5	8	50	−42	.000	5	Rank 22

Updated to match(es) played on 6 September 2024. Source: WBSC

September 3, 2024; 15:00	Hungary	0–10 (4)	Denmark	Sportpark Galecopperzoom, Nieuwegein; Attendance: 61
September 3, 2024; 15:00		Boxscore		Sportpark Galecopperzoom, Nieuwegein; Attendance: 61

September 3, 2024; 17:30	Finland	1–7	Croatia	Sportpark Galecopperzoom, Nieuwegein; Attendance: 83
September 3, 2024; 17:30		Boxscore		Sportpark Galecopperzoom, Nieuwegein; Attendance: 83

September 3, 2024; 20:00	Denmark	5–2	Malta	Sportpark Galecopperzoom, Nieuwegein; Attendance: 58
September 3, 2024; 20:00		Boxscore		Sportpark Galecopperzoom, Nieuwegein; Attendance: 58

September 4, 2024; 12:30	Finland	12–6	Hungary	Sportpark de Paperclip, Utrecht; Attendance: 55
September 4, 2024; 12:30		Boxscore		Sportpark de Paperclip, Utrecht; Attendance: 55

September 4, 2024; 15:00	Malta	2–9 (6)	Croatia	Sportpark Weltevreden, De Bilt; Attendance: 50
September 4, 2024; 15:00		Boxscore		Sportpark Weltevreden, De Bilt; Attendance: 50

September 4, 2024; 17:30	Finland	7–8 (8)	Denmark	Sportpark Weltevreden, De Bilt; Attendance: 55
September 4, 2024; 17:30		Boxscore		Sportpark Weltevreden, De Bilt; Attendance: 55

September 4, 2024; 20:00	Malta	2–0	Bulgaria	Sportpark Weltevreden, De Bilt; Attendance: 53
September 4, 2024; 20:00		Boxscore		Sportpark Weltevreden, De Bilt; Attendance: 53

September 5, 2024; 15:00	Denmark	8–1	Bulgaria	Sportpark Weltevreden, De Bilt; Attendance: 67
September 5, 2024; 15:00		Boxscore		Sportpark Weltevreden, De Bilt; Attendance: 67

September 5, 2024; 17:30	Finland	1–5	Malta	Sportpark Weltevreden, De Bilt; Attendance: 76
September 5, 2024; 17:30		Boxscore		Sportpark Weltevreden, De Bilt; Attendance: 76

September 5, 2024; 20:00	Bulgaria	1–9 (5)	Croatia	Sportpark Weltevreden, De Bilt; Attendance: 77
September 5, 2024; 20:00		Boxscore		Sportpark Weltevreden, De Bilt; Attendance: 77

September 6, 2024; 15:00	Hungary	1–6	Malta	Sportpark Galecopperzoom, Nieuwegein; Attendance: 87
September 6, 2024; 15:00		Boxscore		Sportpark Galecopperzoom, Nieuwegein; Attendance: 87

September 6, 2024; 17:30	Denmark	3–7	Croatia	Sportpark Galecopperzoom, Nieuwegein; Attendance: 75
September 6, 2024; 17:30		Boxscore		Sportpark Galecopperzoom, Nieuwegein; Attendance: 75

September 7, 2024; 10:00	Hungary	1–8 (5)	Bulgaria	Sportpark Galecopperzoom, Nieuwegein; Attendance: 59
September 7, 2024; 10:00		Boxscore		Sportpark Galecopperzoom, Nieuwegein; Attendance: 59

== 13–16th places classification ==
=== Group F ===
Pos	Team	Pld	W	L	RF	RA	RD	PCT	GB	Qualification
1	Switzerland	3	2	1	22	11	+11	.667	—	Advance to 13–16th places classification
2	Sweden	3	2	1	14	17	−3	.667	—	Advance to 13–16th places classification
3	Poland	3	1	2	19	20	−1	.333	1	Advance to 17–22nd places classification
4	Slovakia	3	1	2	15	22	−7	.333	1	Advance to 17–22nd places classification

Source: WBSC

September 3, 2024; 15:00	Switzerland	3–10 (6)	Poland	Sportpark Weltevreden, De Bilt; Attendance: 37
September 3, 2024; 15:00		Boxscore		Sportpark Weltevreden, De Bilt; Attendance: 37

September 3, 2024; 17:30	Sweden	7–4	Slovakia	Sportpark Weltevreden, De Bilt; Attendance: 153
September 3, 2024; 17:30		Boxscore		Sportpark Weltevreden, De Bilt; Attendance: 153

September 4, 2024; 15:00	Slovakia	1–9 (5)	Switzerland	Sportpark Galecopperzoom, Nieuwegein; Attendance: 79
September 4, 2024; 15:00		Boxscore		Sportpark Galecopperzoom, Nieuwegein; Attendance: 79

September 4, 2024; 17:30	Poland	3–7	Sweden	Sportpark de Paperclip - Field 2, Utrecht; Attendance: 54
September 4, 2024; 17:30		Boxscore		Sportpark de Paperclip - Field 2, Utrecht; Attendance: 54

September 5, 2024; 17:30	Sweden	0–10 (4)	Switzerland	Sportpark Galecopperzoom, Nieuwegein; Attendance: 51
September 5, 2024; 17:30		Boxscore		Sportpark Galecopperzoom, Nieuwegein; Attendance: 51

September 5, 2024; 20:00	Slovakia	10–6	Poland	Sportpark Galecopperzoom, Nieuwegein; Attendance: 51
September 5, 2024; 20:00		Boxscore		Sportpark Galecopperzoom, Nieuwegein; Attendance: 51

=== 15–16th places classification ===
September 6, 2024; 17:30	Poland	canceled	Slovakia	Sportpark Weltevreden, De Bilt

=== 13–14th places classification ===
September 7, 2024; 12:30	Sweden	4–3	Switzerland	Sportpark Weltevreden, De Bilt; Attendance: 65
September 7, 2024; 12:30		Boxscore		Sportpark Weltevreden, De Bilt; Attendance: 65

== 7–12th places classification ==
=== Group E ===
Matches already played between the teams of group X (X4, X5 and X6), and Group Y (Y4, Y5 and Y6) are carried over.

Pos	Team	Pld	W	L	RF	RA	RD	PCT	GB	Qualification
1	France	5	5	0	40	3	+37	1.000	—	Rank 7
2	Germany	5	4	1	21	17	+4	.800	1	Rank 8
3	Israel	5	3	2	22	15	+7	.600	2	Rank 9
4	Ukraine	5	2	3	17	30	−13	.400	3	Rank 10
5	Belgium	5	1	4	14	31	−17	.200	4	Rank 11
6	Austria	5	0	5	8	26	−18	.000	5	Rank 12

Source: WBSC

September 5, 2024; 09:30	Germany	6–3	Israel	Sportpark de Paperclip - Field 2, Utrecht; Attendance: 67
September 5, 2024; 09:30		Boxscore		Sportpark de Paperclip - Field 2, Utrecht; Attendance: 67

September 5, 2024; 10:00	Belgium	0–7 (5)	France	Sportpark de Paperclip, Utrecht; Attendance: 51
September 5, 2024; 10:00		Boxscore		Sportpark de Paperclip, Utrecht; Attendance: 51

September 5, 2024; 12:00	Austria	2–4	Ukraine	Sportpark de Paperclip - Field 2, Utrecht; Attendance: 83
September 5, 2024; 12:00		Boxscore		Sportpark de Paperclip - Field 2, Utrecht; Attendance: 83

September 5, 2024; 14:30	Israel	0–6	France	Sportpark de Paperclip - Field 2, Utrecht; Attendance: 64
September 5, 2024; 14:30		Boxscore		Sportpark de Paperclip - Field 2, Utrecht; Attendance: 64

September 5, 2024; 17:00	Austria	3–4	Belgium	Sportpark de Paperclip - Field 2, Utrecht; Attendance: 79
September 5, 2024; 17:00		Boxscore		Sportpark de Paperclip - Field 2, Utrecht; Attendance: 79

September 6, 2024; 09:30	Germany	8–2	Ukraine	Sportpark de Paperclip - Field 2, Utrecht; Attendance: 63
September 6, 2024; 09:30		Boxscore		Sportpark de Paperclip - Field 2, Utrecht; Attendance: 63

September 6, 2024; 12:00	Austria	3–10 (6)	Israel	Sportpark de Paperclip - Field 2, Utrecht; Attendance: 57
September 6, 2024; 12:00		Boxscore		Sportpark de Paperclip - Field 2, Utrecht; Attendance: 57

September 6, 2024; 14:30	Belgium	3–4	Germany	Sportpark de Paperclip - Field 2, Utrecht; Attendance: 87
September 6, 2024; 14:30		Boxscore		Sportpark de Paperclip - Field 2, Utrecht; Attendance: 87

September 6, 2024; 17:00	France	11–1 (6)	Ukraine	Sportpark de Paperclip - Field 2, Utrecht; Attendance: 67
September 6, 2024; 17:00		Boxscore		Sportpark de Paperclip - Field 2, Utrecht; Attendance: 67

== Super Round ==
=== Group Z ===
Matches already played between the teams of group X (X1, X2 and X3), and Group Y (Y1, Y2 and Y3) are carried over.

Pos	Team	Pld	W	L	RF	RA	RD	PCT	GB	Qualification
1	Italy	5	5	0	26	3	+23	1.000	—	Advance to Gold–Silver places classification
2	Great Britain	5	4	1	17	8	+9	.800	1	Advance to Gold–Silver places classification
3	Netherlands (H)	5	3	2	27	14	+13	.600	2	Advance to Bronze–4th places classification
4	Czech Republic	5	2	3	10	14	−4	.400	3	Advance to Bronze–4th places classification
5	Spain	5	1	4	15	20	−5	.200	4	Rank 5
6	Greece	5	0	5	3	39	−36	.000	5	Rank 6

Updated to match(es) played on 6 September 2024. Source: WBSC
(H) Hosts

September 5, 2024; 12:30	Spain	0–3	Italy	Sportpark de Paperclip, Utrecht; Attendance: 115
September 5, 2024; 12:30		Boxscore		Sportpark de Paperclip, Utrecht; Attendance: 115

September 5, 2024; 15:00	Greece	2–13 (4)	Netherlands	Sportpark de Paperclip, Utrecht; Attendance: 243
September 5, 2024; 15:00		Boxscore		Sportpark de Paperclip, Utrecht; Attendance: 243

September 5, 2024; 17:30	Czech Republic	1–4	Great Britain	Sportpark de Paperclip, Utrecht; Attendance: 242
September 5, 2024; 17:30		Boxscore		Sportpark de Paperclip, Utrecht; Attendance: 242

September 5, 2024; 20:00	Italy	5–1	Netherlands	Sportpark de Paperclip, Utrecht; Attendance: 1,123
September 5, 2024; 20:00		Boxscore		Sportpark de Paperclip, Utrecht; Attendance: 1,123

September 6, 2024; 10:00	Greece	0–1	Czech Republic	Sportpark de Paperclip, Utrecht; Attendance: 61
September 6, 2024; 10:00		Boxscore		Sportpark de Paperclip, Utrecht; Attendance: 61

September 6, 2024; 12:30	Spain	1–2	Great Britain	Sportpark de Paperclip, Utrecht; Attendance: 236
September 6, 2024; 12:30		Boxscore		Sportpark de Paperclip, Utrecht; Attendance: 236

September 6, 2024; 15:00	Czech Republic	2–7	Italy	Sportpark de Paperclip, Utrecht; Attendance: 129
September 6, 2024; 15:00		Boxscore		Sportpark de Paperclip, Utrecht; Attendance: 129

September 6, 2024; 17:30	Greece	0–10 (4)	Spain	Sportpark de Paperclip, Utrecht; Attendance: 255
September 6, 2024; 17:30		Boxscore		Sportpark de Paperclip, Utrecht; Attendance: 255

September 6, 2024; 20:00	Great Britain	3–1	Netherlands	Sportpark de Paperclip, Utrecht; Attendance: 1,611
September 6, 2024; 20:00		Boxscore		Sportpark de Paperclip, Utrecht; Attendance: 1,611

== Finals ==
=== Bronze–4th places classification ===
September 7, 2024; 14:30	Czech Republic	2–8	Netherlands	Sportpark de Paperclip, Utrecht; Attendance: 1,741
September 7, 2024; 14:30		Boxscore		Sportpark de Paperclip, Utrecht; Attendance: 1,741

=== Gold–Silver places classification ===
September 7, 2024; 16:30	Great Britain	0–4	Italy	Sportpark de Paperclip, Utrecht; Attendance: 1,678
September 7, 2024; 16:30		Boxscore		Sportpark de Paperclip, Utrecht; Attendance: 1,678

== Final Ranking ==
Rk	Team	W	L	Pct.
1st place, gold medalist(s)	Italy	9	0	1.000
2nd place, silver medalist(s)	Great Britain	7	2	.778
3rd place, bronze medalist(s)	Netherlands	7	2	.778
4	Czech Republic	5	4	.556
5	Spain	4	4	.500
6	Greece	2	6	.250
7	France	7	3	.700
8	Germany	4	4	.500
9	Israel	3	5	.375
10	Ukraine	6	5	.545
11	Belgium	3	7	.300
12	Austria	3	8	.273
13	Sweden	5	2	.714
14	Switzerland	3	3	.500
15	Slovakia	3	3	.500
16	Poland	2	3	.400
17	Croatia	5	2	.714
18	Denmark	4	3	.571
19	Malta	3	4	.429
20	Bulgaria	2	5	.286
21	Finland	1	6	.143
22	Hungary	0	7	.000
