= 2015 ESF Women's Championship =

Tournament details
- Host country: Netherlands
- Dates: 19–25 July
- Teams: 20
- Defending champions: Netherlands (2013)

Final positions
- Champions: Italy (10th title)
- Runner-up: Netherlands
- Third place: Czech Republic
- Fourth place: Russia

The 2015 ESF Women's Championship was an international European softball competition that was held in Rosmalen, Netherlands from July 19 to July 25, 2015.

== Results ==
=== Group A ===
Team	Pld	W	L	AVG
Netherlands	4	4	0	1000
Germany	4	3	1	750
Sweden	4	2	2	500
Denmark	4	1	3	250
Israel	4	0	4	0

=== Group B ===
Team	Pld	W	L	AVG
Russia	4	4	0	1000
Spain	4	3	1	750
France	4	2	2	500
Poland	4	1	3	250
Croatia	4	0	4	0

=== Group C ===
Team	Pld	W	L	AVG
Czech Republic	4	4	0	1000
Austria	4	3	1	750
Ukraine	4	2	2	500
Slovenia	4	1	3	250
Ireland	4	0	4	0

=== Group D ===
Team	Pld	W	L	AVG
Italy	4	4	0	1000
Great Britain	4	3	1	750
Greece	4	2	2	500
Slovakia	4	1	3	250
Switzerland	4	0	4	0

=== Medal Round ===
Semifinals
W3	Netherlands	0
W4	Italy	2
W5	Czech Republic	5
W6	Russia	2

Bronze Medal
L7	Netherlands	1
W8	Czech Republic	0

Gold Medal
W7	Italy	2
W9	Netherlands	1

== Final standings ==
Qualified for 2016 Women's Softball World Championship.
Received invitation to 2016 Women's Softball World Championship.

#	Teams
1	Italy
2	Netherlands
3	Czech Republic
4	Russia
5	Great Britain
6	Austria
7	Germany
8	Spain
9	France
10	Greece
11	Sweden
12	Ukraine
13	Denmark
14	Slovenia
15	Poland
16	Slovakia
17	Croatia
18	Switzerland
19	Ireland
20	Israel
