= 2021 Women's Softball European Championship =

Tournament details
- Host country: Italy
- Dates: 27 June – 3 July 2021
- Teams: 17
- Defending champions: Italy (2021)

Final positions
- Champions: Italy (12th title)
- Runner-up: Netherlands
- Third place: Czech Republic
- Fourth place: Israel

The 2021 ESF Women's Championship was an international European softball competition that was held in Friuli-Venezia Giulia, Italy; from 27 June to 3 July 2021.

== Round Robin 1 ==
=== Pool A ===
Qualified for Round Robin 2
Qualified for Classification Round

Teams	W	L	Pct.	GB	R	RA
Italy	4	0	1.000	–	65	0
Russia	3	1	.750	0.5	39	9
Poland	2	2	.500	1.5	21	22
Bulgaria	1	3	.250	2.5	8	49
Hungary	0	4	.000	3.0	3	56

June 27

Team	1	2	3	4	R	H	E
Bulgaria	0	0	0	0	0	1	2
Russia	0	8	0	2	10	10	0
WP: Iullia Grib (1-0) LP: Teodora Simeonova (0-1); Home runs: BUL: None; RUS: None

Team	1	2	3	4	R	H	E
Hungary	1	0	0	0	1	1	2
Poland	1	0	2	8	11	12	0
WP: Emilia Kozioł (1-0) LP: Kathryn Ogg (0-1); Home runs: HUN: None; POL: None

Team	1	2	3	4	5	R	H	E
Russia	0	0	0	0	0	0	0	1
Italy	2	0	0	7	-	9	8	0
WP: Greta Cecchetti (1-0) LP: Mayya Shalvaadze (0-1); Home runs: RUS: None; ITA: Erika Piancastelli (1), Andrea Filler (1)

June 28

Team	1	2	3	4	5	R	H	E
Poland	0	4	1	1	4	10	10	1
Bulgaria	0	0	0	0	0	0	0	7
WP: Camille Czarnecki (1-0) LP: Teodora Simeonova (0-2) Sv: Raina Galbiati (1)

Team	1	2	3	4	R	H	E
Russia	0	4	9	5	18	14	0
Hungary	0	0	0	0	0	2	4
WP: Vera Kukharenko (1-0) LP: Tamara Házi (0-1); Home runs: RUS: Tatiana Pinigina (1), Nina Zakaznikova (1); HUN: None

Team	1	2	3	4	R	H	E
Italy	5	0	2	3	10	8	0
Poland	0	0	0	0	0	3	0
WP: Ilaria Cacciamani (1-0) LP: Emilia Kozioł (1-1); Home runs: ITA: Andrea Filler (2), Giulia Longhi (1); POL: None

June 29

Team	1	2	3	4	5	6	7	R	H	E
Bulgaria	2	0	2	1	1	2	0	8	11	2
Hungary	1	0	1	0	0	0	0	2	5	3
WP: Simona Yordanova (1-0) LP: Victoria Sovak (0-1) Sv: Teodora Simeonova (1)

Team	1	2	3	R	H	E
Italy	9	9	9	27	18	0
Bulgaria	0	0	0	0	1	0
WP: Alexia Lacatena (1-0) LP: Mariya Fetvova (0-1); Home runs: ITA: Andrea Howard (1), Giulia Longhi (2,3); BUL: None

Team	1	2	3	4	R	H	E
Poland	0	0	0	0	0	0	1
Russia	2	0	0	9	11	13	2
WP: Nina Zakaznikova (1-0) LP: Camille Czarnecki (1-1); Home runs: POL: None; RUS: Grace Perechinksy (1), Milana Kozhina (1)

Team	1	2	3	R	H	E
Hungary	0	0	0	0	0	3
Italy	10	9	X	19	12	1
WP: Lisa Birocci (1-0) LP: Kathryn Ogg (0-2); Home runs: HUN: None; ITA: Andrea Howard (2, 3), Amanda Fama (1), Melany Sheldon (1), Beatrice Ricchi (1)

=== Pool B ===
Qualified for Round Robin 2
Qualified for Classification Round

Teams	W	L	Pct.	GB	R	RA
Netherlands	3	0	1.000	–	41	6
Germany	2	1	.500	1.5	30	13
Austria	1	3	.500	1.5	20	23
Lithuania	0	3	.000	3.0	1	50

June 27

Team	1	2	3	4	5	R	H	E
Netherlands	3	1	4	1	7	16	14	0
Austria	0	0	0	0	0	0	1	4
WP: Kirsten Scheele (1-0) LP: Martina Lackner-Keil (0-1); Home runs: NED: Wies Ligtvoet (1), Jessie Van Aalst (1), Annemiek Jansen (1), Maxime Van Dalen (1), Dinet Oosting (1), Suka Van Gurp (1); AUT: None

Team	1	2	3	4	R	H	E
Germany	0	0	11	6	17	9	0
Lithuania	1	0	0	0	1	3	5
WP: Lee Lankhorst (1-0) LP: Nomeda Neverauskaitė (0-1); Home runs: GER: None; LTU: None

June 28

Team	1	2	3	R	H	E
Lithuania	0	0	0	0	0	5
Austria	11	6	X	17	11	0
WP: Martina Lackner-Keil (1-1) LP: Nomeda Neverauskaitė (0-2); Home runs: LTU: None; AUT: Caroline Meriaux (1)

Team	1	2	3	4	5	6	7	R	H	E
Germany	0	0	0	3	0	3	0	6	4	1
Netherlands	2	0	0	1	4	2	X	9	10	4
WP: Lisa Hop (1-0) LP: Hannah Held (0-1) Sv: Lindsey Meadows (1); Home runs: GER: None; NED: Jessie Van Aalst (2), Dinet Oosting (2), Laura Wissink (1)

June 29

Team	1	2	3	R	H	E
Lithuania	0	0	0	0	1	2
Netherlands	9	7	X	16	12	0
WP: Kirsten Scheele (2-0) LP: Ugne Kucinskaite (0-1); Home runs: LTU: None; NED: Dinet Oosting (3)

Team	1	2	3	4	5	6	7	R	H	E
Austria	0	2	1	0	0	0	0	3	5	6
Germany	0	2	0	0	2	3	X	7	8	2
WP: Hannah Held (1-1) LP: Martina Lackner-Keil (1-2); Home runs: AUT: None; GER: Katharina Szalay (1)

=== Pool C ===
Qualified for Round Robin 2
Qualified for Classification Round

Teams	W	L	Pct.	GB	R	RA
Israel	3	0	1.000	–	25	7
Czech Republic	2	1	.500	1.0	21	5
Croatia	1	2	.500	1.0	3	17
Denmark	0	3	.000	2.0	5	25

June 27

Team	1	2	3	4	5	R	H	E
Denmark	0	0	0	0	0	0	3	3
Czech Republic	4	4	0	1	X	9	11	1
WP: Martina Bláhová (1-0) LP: Mathilde Nielsen (0-1); Home runs: DEN: None; CZE: None

Team	1	2	3	4	5	R	H	E
Croatia	0	0	0	0	0	0	1	2
Israel	0	0	2	0	5	7	8	0
WP: Ava Justman (1-0) LP: Marina Vitalich (0-1); Home runs: CRO: None; ISR: Rube Salzman (1)

June 28

Team	1	2	3	4	5	6	7	R	H	E
Denmark	0	0	0	0	0	2	0	2	2	1
Croatia	0	0	0	2	1	0	X	3	3	3
WP: Marina Vitalich (1-1) LP: Mathilde Nielsen (0-2); Home runs: DEN: None; CRO: Rita Despot (1)

Team	1	2	3	4	5	6	7	R	H	E
Israel	0	4	0	1	0	0	0	5	7	0
Czech Republic	1	0	0	1	2	0	0	4	10	3
WP: Robyn Wampler (1-0) LP: Anna Zoulová (0-1) Sv: Ava Justman (1)

June 29

Team	1	2	3	4	5	R	H	E
Czech Republic	2	1	1	0	4	8	4	0
Croatia	0	0	0	0	0	0	0	8
WP: Martina Bláhová (2-0) LP: Addison Kostrenchich (0-1)

Team	1	2	3	4	5	R	H	E
Israel	4	3	1	1	4	13	16	2
Denmark	0	0	0	2	1	3	5	0
WP: Sydney Goldman (1-0) LP: Nikoline Pederson (0-1); Home runs: ISR: Alexis Kaiser (1); DEN: None

=== Pool D ===
Qualified for Round Robin 2
Qualified for Classification Round

Teams	W	L	Pct.	GB	R	RA
Spain	3	0	1.000	–	19	6
France	2	1	.500	1.0	20	12
Ukraine	1	2	.333	2.0	11	16
Slovakia	0	3	.000	3.0	10	26

June 27

Team	1	2	3	4	5	6	7	R	H	E
Slovakia	0	0	1	0	0	2	0	3	6	1
Spain	0	0	2	0	2	1	X	5	9	0
WP: Beatriz Alonso (1-0) LP: Dominika Rampáčková (0-1); Home runs: SVK: None; ESP: Raquel Moncho (1)

Team	1	2	3	4	5	6	7	R	H	E
Ukraine	0	0	0	0	0	0	2	2	6	2
France	3	0	0	0	1	1	X	5	7	2
WP: Clélia Costes (1-0) LP: Yuliia Malik (0-1); Home runs: UKR: None; FRA: None

June 28

Team	1	2	3	4	5	R	H	E
France	0	1	0	1	0	2	8	1
Spain	0	2	2	6	X	10	8	2
WP: Raquel Fernández (1-0) LP: Louise Le Chenadec (0-1); Home runs: FRA: None; ESP: None

Team	1	2	3	4	5	6	7	R	H	E
Slovakia	2	1	0	0	2	0	2	7	14	3
Ukraine	0	6	0	0	1	1	X	8	7	3
WP: Yuliia Malik (1-1) LP: Dominika Rampáčková (0-2)

June 29

Team	1	2	3	4	5	6	7	R	H	E
Spain	1	0	2	0	0	0	1	4	7	2
Ukraine	0	0	0	0	1	0	0	1	5	1
WP: Raquel Fernández (2-0) LP: Daria Kobylianska (0-1)

Team	1	2	3	4	R	H	E
France	9	0	4	0	13	9	0
Slovakia	0	0	0	0	0	3	1
WP: Louise Le Chenadec (1-1) LP: Dominika Rampáčková (0-3)

== Round Robin 2 ==
=== Pool E ===
Qualified for Final Round Robin
Qualified for 7th-place game

Teams	W	L	Pct.	GB	R	RA
Italy	3	0	1.000	–	28	0
Czech Republic	1	2	.500	2.0	10	8
Spain	1	2	.000	2.0	9	22
Germany	1	2	.500	2.0	11	28

June 30

Team	1	2	3	4	5	6	7	R	H	E
Germany	0	0	4	4	0	0	1	9	11	4
Spain	0	6	0	0	0	1	1	8	10	3
WP: Hannah Held (2-1) LP: Raquel Fernández (2-1)

Team	1	2	3	4	5	6	7	R	H	E
Czech Republic	0	0	0	0	0	0	0	0	1	1
Italy	0	0	0	0	5	0	X	5	5	0
WP: Greta Cecchetti (2-0) LP: Veronika Pecková (0-1); Home runs: CZE: None; ITA: Erika Piancastelli (2)

Team	1	2	3	4	5	R	H	E
Czech Republic	1	0	1	6	2	10	15	1
Germany	0	0	0	0	2	2	2	1
WP: Katerina Kindermannova (1-0) LP: Hannah Held (2-2)

Team	1	2	3	4	R	H	E
Spain	0	0	0	0	0	1	0
Italy	4	6	3	X	13	9	0
WP: Ilaria Cacciamani (2-0) LP: Julia Sebastián (0-1); Home runs: ESP: None; ITA: Brittany Abacherli (1)

July 1

Team	1	2	3	4	5	6	7	8	R	H	E
Czech Republic	0	0	0	0	0	0	0	0	0	5	0
Spain	0	0	0	0	0	0	0	1	1	2	2
WP: Beatriz Alonso (2-0) LP: Anna Zoulová (0-2)

Team	1	2	3	4	R	H	E
Germany	0	0	0	0	0	1	2
Italy	5	1	0	4	10	11	0
WP: Alexia Lacatena (2-0) LP: Claudia Volkmann (0-1); Home runs: GER: None; ITA: Andrea Howard (4), Erika Piancastelli (3), Giulia Longhi (4)

=== Pool F ===
Qualified for Final Round Robin
Qualified for 7th-place game

Teams	W	L	Pct.	GB	R	RA
Netherlands	3	0	1.000	–	29	3
Israel	2	1	.500	1.0	14	14
France	1	2	.500	1.0	6	18
Russia	0	3	.000	2.0	10	24

June 30

Team	1	2	3	4	5	R	H	E
France	1	0	0	0	0	1	7	0
Netherlands	4	1	1	0	2	8	6	0
WP: Lisa Hop (2-0) LP: Louise Le Chenadec (1-2); Home runs: FRA: None; NED: Cindy Van Der Zanden (1, 2), Dinet Oosting (4)

Team	1	2	3	4	5	6	7	8	R	H	E
Israel	1	0	2	1	0	0	0	3	7	11	2
Russia	1	0	0	0	3	0	0	1	5	13	1
WP: Robyn Wampler (2-0) LP: Iuliia Grib (1-1); Home runs: ISR: Ruby Salzman (2), Darby Rosen (1); RUS: None

Team	1	2	3	4	5	R	H	E
Israel	0	0	0	0	0	0	1	0
Netherlands	2	0	2	1	4	9	5	1
WP: Ginger De Weert (1-0) LP: Sydney Goldman (1-1); Home runs: ISR: Cindy Van Der Zanden (3), Dinet Oosting (5); NED: None

Team	1	2	3	4	5	6	7	R	H	E
France	0	0	0	3	0	2	0	5	9	2
Russia	0	0	0	0	0	0	3	3	6	3
WP: Louise Le Chenadec (2-2) LP: Vera Kukharenko (1-1)

July 1

Team	1	2	3	4	5	R	H	E
France	0	0	0	0	0	0	4	1
Israel	2	0	3	2	X	7	7	0
WP: Robyn Wampler (3-0) LP: Louise Le Chenadec (2-3); Home runs: FRA: None; ISR: Alexis Kaiser (2)

Team	1	2	3	4	R	H	E
Netherlands	6	3	0	3	12	9	0
Russia	0	0	0	2	2	5	0
WP: Lisa Hop (3-0) LP: Mayya Shalvadze (0-2); Home runs: NED: Britt Vonk (1); RUS: None

=== Pool G ===
Teams	W	L	Pct.	GB	R	RA
Poland	4	0	1.000	–	38	3
Ukraine	3	1	.750	1.0	34	7
Denmark	2	2	.500	2.0	34	20
Hungary	1	3	.250	3.0	13	29
Lithuania	0	4	.000	4.0	7	67

June 30

Team	1	2	3	4	R	H	E
Ukraine	9	1	2	7	19	13	1
Lithuania	0	0	0	0	0	2	6
WP: Valeriia Doloban (1-0) LP: Nomeda Neverauskaitė (0-3)

Team	1	2	3	4	5	R	H	E
Denmark	0	0	0	0	1	1	6	2
Poland	0	2	0	4	4	10	9	1
WP: Camille Czarnecki (1-1) LP: Mathilde Nielsen (0-3)

Team	1	2	3	4	5	6	R	H	E
Hungary	1	2	1	4	0	4	12	9	1
Lithuania	0	0	1	1	2	0	4	5	7
WP: Victoria Sovak (1-1) LP: Nomeda Neverauskaitė (0-4)

July 1

Team	1	2	3	4	5	6	R	H	E
Hungary	0	0	0	0	0	0	0	1	2
Ukraine	1	0	1	2	2	1	7	12	3
WP: Daria Kobylianska (1-1) LP: Tamara Házi (0-2)

Team	1	2	3	4	5	6	7	R	H	E
Ukraine	0	0	0	0	0	0	0	0	1	1
Poland	0	0	0	1	0	0	X	1	7	3
WP: Camille Czarnecki (2-1) LP: Yuliia Malik (1-2)

Team	1	2	3	4	5	R	H	E
Denmark	8	0	3	0	9	20	9	2
Lithuania	2	0	0	0	0	2	3	12
WP: Sara Hinze (1-0) LP: Nomeda Neverauskaitė (0-5)

July 2

Team	1	2	3	4	5	6	R	H	E
Hungary	0	0	0	0	0	0	0	1	2
Denmark	1	0	4	1	0	1	7	10	3
WP: Sara Hinze (2–0) LP: Kathryn Ogg (0–3)

Team	1	2	3	R	H	E
Lithuania	1	0	0	1	2	4
Poland	10	1	5	16	6	1
WP: Ewelina Piszczek (1–0) LP: Akvile Barzdziute (0–1)

Team	1	2	3	4	5	6	7	8	9	R	H	E
Ukraine	0	0	2	0	2	0	0	1	3	8	8	1
Denmark	0	0	0	2	0	2	0	1	1	6	11	4
WP: Yuliia Malik (2–2) LP: Mathilde Nielsen (0–4); Home runs: UKR: Daria Kobylianska (1); DEN: None

=== Pool H ===
Teams	W	L	Pct.	GB	R	RA
Croatia	2	1	.667	–	6	10
Austria	2	1	.667	–	15	6
Slovakia	1	2	.333	1.0	8	8
Bulgaria	1	2	.333	1.0	19	24

June 30

Team	1	2	3	4	5	R	H	E
Austria	0	4	7	1	2	14	16	2
Bulgaria	3	1	0	0	1	5	8	5
WP: Clara Langthaler (1-0) LP: Teodora Simeonova (0-3)

Team	1	2	3	4	5	6	7	R	H	E
Slovakia	0	0	0	1	0	0	0	1	3	2
Croatia	0	0	1	1	0	0	X	2	9	0
WP: Marina Vitalich (2-1) LP: Dominika Rampáčková (0-4)

July 1

Team	1	2	3	4	5	6	7	R	H	E
Slovakia	3	0	2	0	1	0	1	7	10	2
Bulgaria	0	1	0	2	0	0	2	5	5	4
WP: Dana Drgoňová (1-0) LP: Teodora Simeonova (0-4)

Team	1	2	3	4	5	6	7	R	H	E
Croatia	0	0	0	0	0	0	1	1	6	0
Austria	0	0	0	0	0	0	0	0	4	2
WP: Marina Vitalich (3-1) LP: Martine Lackner-Keil (1-3)

July 2

Team	1	2	3	4	5	6	7	R	H	E
Croatia	0	0	0	1	0	2	0	3	4	5
Bulgaria	0	0	0	5	0	4	X	9	9	3
WP: Simona Yordanova (2–0) LP: Addison Kostrenchich (0–2)

Team	1	2	3	4	5	6	7	R	H	E
Slovakia	0	0	0	0	0	0	0	0	1	0
Austria	0	0	0	1	0	0	X	1	3	4
WP: Martina Lackner–Keil (2–3) LP: Dominika Rampáčková (0-5)

== Final Round Robin ==
=== Pool X ===
Qualified for Championship Game
Qualified for Third-place game
Eliminated

Teams	W	L	Pct.	GB	R	RA
Italy	5	0	1.000	–	41	1
Netherlands	4	1	.667	1.0	34	7
Czech Republic	2	3	.667	3.0	9	11
Israel	2	3	.333	3.0	15	23
Spain	2	3	.667	3.0	9	32
France	0	5	.000	5.0	2	34

July 1

Team	1	2	3	4	5	6	7	R	H	E
Israel	0	1	0	0	0	0	0	1	2	1
Czech Republic	1	0	1	0	1	0	X	3	9	0
WP: Veronika Pecková (1-1) LP: Robyn Wampler (3-1); Home runs: ISR: Aliyah Heurta-Leipner (1); CZE: None

Team	1	2	3	4	5	6	R	H	E
France	0	0	1	0	0	0	1	6	2
Spain	4	0	2	1	0	1	8	8	1
WP: Paula Morbelli (1-0) LP: Clélia Costes (1-1)

Team	1	2	3	4	5	6	7	R	H	E
Netherlands	1	0	0	0	0	0	0	1	7	2
Italy	1	0	0	1	0	0	X	2	6	0
WP: Greta Cecchetti (3-0) LP: Ginger De Weert (1-1) Sv: Ilaria Cacciamani (1)

July 2

Team	1	2	3	4	5	6	7	8	R	H	E
France	0	0	0	0	0	0	0	0	0	3	1
Czech Republic	0	0	0	0	0	0	0	1	1	3	0
WP: Veronika Pecková (2–1) LP: Louise Le Chenadec (2–4)

Team	1	2	3	4	R	H	E
Spain	0	0	0	0	0	2	1
Netherlands	3	2	6	X	11	11	0
WP: Marjolein Merkx (1–0) LP: Raquel Fernández (2–2)

Team	1	2	3	4	R	H	E
Israel	0	0	0	0	0	3	0
Italy	2	3	6	X	11	9	1
WP: Alexia Lacatena (3–0) LP: Sydney Goldman (1–2); Home runs: ISR: None; ITA: Erika Piancastelli (4)

Team	1	2	3	4	5	6	7	R	H	E
Czech Republic	0	0	0	2	0	0	2	4	8	1
Netherlands	0	0	0	3	1	0	1	5	6	0
WP: Ginger De Weert (2–1) LP: Veronika Pecková (2–2); Home runs: CZE: Gabriela Sabá (1), Barbora Saviola (1); NED: Britt Vonk (2), Mariëlle Vleugels (1)

Team	1	2	3	4	R	H	E
France	0	0	0	0	0	2	1
Italy	0	6	1	3	10	9	0
WP: Lisa Birocci (2–0) LP: Louise Le Chenadec (2–5); Home runs: FRA: None; ITA: Erika Piancastelli (5), Melany Sheldon (2)

Team	1	2	3	4	5	R	H	E
Spain	0	0	0	0	0	0	2	0
Israel	0	0	7	0	X	7	8	0
WP: Robyn Wampler (4–1) LP: Beatriz Alonso (2–1)

== Classification round ==
=== 15th-place game ===
Team	1	2	3	4	5	R	H	E
Hungary	0	0	0	0	0	0	2	5
Bulgaria	0	1	2	2	2	7	3	0
WP: Simona Yordanova (3–0) LP: Kathryn Ogg (0–4)

=== 13th-place game ===
Team	1	2	3	4	5	6	7	R	H	E
Denmark	0	0	1	0	0	0	0	1	4	3
Slovakia	3	0	0	2	0	1	X	6	6	0
WP: Dominika Rampáčková (1–5) LP: Mathilde Nielsen (0–5)

=== 11th-place game ===
Team	1	2	3	4	5	R	H	E
Austria	0	1	3	0	6	10	6	1
Ukraine	0	0	0	0	0	0	2	2
WP: Martina Lackner–Keil (3–3) LP: Daria Kobylianska (1–2); Home runs: AUT: Valentina Cartes Zumelzu (1); UKR: None

=== 9th-place game ===
Team	1	2	3	4	5	6	7	8	R	H	E
Poland	0	0	0	0	0	0	0	1	1	6	0
Croatia	0	0	0	0	0	0	0	0	0	4	0
WP: Camille Czarnecki (3–1) LP: Marina Vitalich (3–2)

=== 7th-place game ===
Team	1	2	3	4	5	6	7	R	H	E
Russia	1	1	0	0	0	0	0	2	6	2
Germany	1	0	1	0	0	0	1	3	6	3
WP: Hannah Held (3–2) LP: Iuliia Grib (1–2)

=== 3rd-place game ===
Team	1	2	3	4	5	6	7	R	H	E
Israel	0	0	0	0	0	0	0	0	0	0
Czech Republic	0	0	0	0	2	0	X	2	7	0
WP: Veronika Pecková (3–2) LP: Robyn Wampler (4–2) Sv: Katerina Kindermannova (1)

=== Championship Game ===
Team	1	2	3	4	5	6	7	R	H	E
Netherlands	3	0	0	0	0	0	2	5	9	0
Italy	1	3	0	4	0	1	X	9	15	0
WP: Greta Cecchetti (4–0) LP: Marjolein Merkx (1–1) Sv: Alexia Lacatena (1); Home runs: NED: Laura Wissink (2); ITA: Andrea Howard (5, 6), Erika Piancastelli (6)

== Final standings ==
Rk	Team	W	L	Pct.	R	RA
1st place, gold medalist(s)	Italy	11	0	1.000	0	0
2nd place, silver medalist(s)	Netherlands	8	2	.800	0	0
3rd place, bronze medalist(s)	Czech Republic	6	4	.600	0	0
4	Israel	6	4	.600	0	0
5	Spain	5	4	.555	37	46
6	France	3	6	.333	27	49
7	Germany	4	3	.571	0	0
8	Russia	3	5	.375	0	0
9	Poland	6	2	.750	0	0
10	Croatia	3	4	.429	0	0
11	Austria	4	3	.571	0	0
12	Ukraine	4	4	.500	0	0
13	Slovakia	2	5	.286	0	0
14	Denmark	2	6	.250	0	0
15	Bulgaria	3	5	.375	0	0
16	Hungary	1	7	.125	0	0
17	Lithuania	0	7	.000	8	117

== Statistics leaders ==
=== Batting ===
Statistic	Name	Total/Avg
Batting average*	(Italy) Giulia Longhi	.667
Hits	(Italy) Andrea Howard	18
Runs	(Netherlands) Britt Vonk	16
Home runs	(Italy) Andrea Howard (Italy) Erika Piancastelli	6
RBIs	(Italy) Andrea Howard	23
Walks	(Netherlands) Jessie Van Aalst	11
Strikeouts	(Israel) Alexis Kaiser	12
Stolen bases	(Netherlands) Britt Vonk	7
On-base percentage*	(Italy) Erika Piancastelli	.688
Slugging percentage*	(Italy) Erika Piancastelli	1.409

* Minimum 1.0 plate appearances per game

=== Pitching ===
Statistic	Name	Total/Avg
Wins	(Israel) Robyn Wampler (Italy) Greta Cecchetti	4
Losses	4 players	5
Saves	6 players	1
Innings pitched	(Ukraine) Yuliia Malik	33.2
Hits allowed	(Czech Republic) Katerina Kindermannova	3
Runs allowed	(Italy) Alexia Lacatena	0
Earned runs allowed	(Czech Republic) Katerina Kindermannova (Italy) Alexia Lacatena	0
ERA*	(Czech Republic) Katerina Kindermannova (Italy) Alexia Lacatena	0.00
Walks	(Lithuania) Ugne Kucinskaite	27
Strikeouts	(Czech Republic) Veronika Pecková	65

* Minimum 1.0 inning pitched per game
