= Elisa Cecchetti =

Italian softball player

Diablos Rojos del México – No. 15
- Catcher
- Born: 21 August 1995 (age 30); Bollate, Lombardy, Italy
- Bats: Right Throws: Right

Teams
- Diablos Rojos del México (2025–present)

Career highlights and awards
- Mexican Softball League champion (2025)
Medals
Women's softball
Representing Italy
Women's Softball European Championship
Gold medal – first place	2015 Rosmalen	Team
Gold medal – first place	2019 Ostrava	Team
Gold medal – first place	2021 Castions di Strada	Team
Gold medal – first place	2024 Utrecht	Team
Silver medal – second place	2013 Prague	Team
Silver medal – second place	2017 Bollate	Team
Bronze medal – third place	2022 Sant Boi de Llobregat	Team

Elisa Cecchetti (born 21 August 1995) is an Italian professional softball catcher for the Diablos Rojos del México of the Mexican Softball League. She plays international softball for Italy and competed in the 2020 Summer Olympics.

== Early career ==
Cecchetti was born on 21 August 1995 in Bollate, Lombardy, Italy. She started practicing softball with her sister and cousins in the local softball club Bollate Softball 1969. She played and won several Italian titles with Bollate's U13, U15 and U21 teams. She made her Serie A1 Softball debut in 2011, aged 17.

After finishing high school, she emigrated to the United States, where she played college softball for four years. In 2016 and 2017 she played for the Tallahassee Community College and later transferred to the University of South Carolina Upstate, playing in 2018 and 2019 for the USC Upstate Spartans.

== Professional career ==
On 27 November 2024, she was signed by the Diablos Rojos del México of the Mexican Softball League ahead of the 2025 season.

== International career ==
Cecchetti made her debut with the Italian national team during the 2013 ESF Women's Championship held in Prague, Czech Republic, where the Italian squad won the silver medal after the losing the final game against the Netherlands. She was also part of the team that won the 2015 ESF Women's Championship held in Rosmalen, Netherlands. In 2017 she participated in the 2017 ESF Women's Championship held in Bollate, where Italy won the silver medal. She won the gold medal in the 2019 ESF Women's Championship held in Ostrava, Czech Republic and the 2021 ESF Women's Championship held in Italy.

She was part of the Italian team that competed at the 2020 Summer Olympics (held in 2021) in Tokyo, Japan.

She recently competed in the 2022 Women's Softball European Championship held in Sant Boi de Llobregat, Spain, where the Italian squad won the bronze medal.

== Personal life ==
Her sister Martina and cousins Greta and Lara are also softball players; Greta too represented Italy at the 2020 Summer Olympics.
