= ESF Junior Girls Championship =

- Sport: Softball
- Founded: 1991
- No. of teams: 11 (in 2021)
- Continent: Europe
- Most recent champions: Czech Republic (2025) (4th title)
- Most titles: Italy (7 titles)

The European Softball Junior Girls Championship (U-18) (U-18 Women’s Softball European Championship) is the main championship tournament between national junior girls softball teams in Europe, governed by the European Softball Federation.

== Results ==
#	Year	Host	Final		Semifinalists	
#	Year	Host	Champions	Runners-up	3rd place	4th place
1	1991	(Czech Republic); Prague	Italy	Czechoslovakia	Spain	Soviet Union
2	1993	(Italy); Livorno	Italy	Netherlands	Czech Republic	Sweden
3	1994	(Sweden); Leksand	Italy	Netherlands	Czech Republic	Russia
4	1996	(Italy); Nuoro	Netherlands	Czech Republic	Italy	Russia
5	1998	(Czech Republic); Prague	Netherlands	Czech Republic	Italy	Russia
6	2000	(Netherlands); Enschede	Netherlands	Russia	Czech Republic	Italy
7	2002	(Czech Republic); Kostelec	Italy	Russia	Czech Republic	Netherlands
8	2004	(France); Roissy	Netherlands	Czech Republic	Italy	Russia
9	2006	(Italy); Collecchio	Italy	Netherlands	Russia	Germany
10	2008	(Germany); Deggendorf	Netherlands	Italy	Czech Republic	Russia
11	2010	(Austria); Vienna	Italy	Germany	Russia	Czech Republic
12	2014	(Netherlands); Rosmalen	Czech Republic	Italy	Russia	Great Britain
13	2016	(Spain); Sant Boi	Great Britain	Italy	Czech Republic	Germany
14	2018	(Italy); Staranzano	Italy	Ireland	Czech Republic	Netherlands
15	2019	(Croatia); Zagreb	Netherlands	Italy	Czech Republic	Russia
16	2021	(Czech Republic); Prague	Czech Republic	Italy	Netherlands	Spain
17	2023	(Czech Republic); Prague	Czech Republic	Italy	Ireland	Netherlands
18	2025	(Spain); Pamplona	Czech Republic	Italy	Netherlands	Ireland
19	2027	(Czech Republic); Hluboká nad Vltavou				

== Medal table ==
Rank	Nation	Gold	Silver	Bronze	Total
1	Italy	7	7	3	17
2	Netherlands	6	3	2	11
3	Czech Republic	4	3	8	15
4	Great Britain	1	0	0	1
5	Russia	0	2	3	5
6	Ireland	0	1	1	2
7	Czechoslovakia	0	1	0	1
7	Germany	0	1	0	1
9	Spain	0	0	1	1
Totals (9 entries)		18	18	18	54

== Other Ages ==
=== U-22 Women's Softball European Championship - Past Results ===
1. 2008 Turin (ITA): Italy,Russia,Spain
2. 2010 Prague (CZE): Czech Republic,Italy,Russia
3. 2012 Havlíčkův Brod (CZE): Russia,Czech Republic,France
4. 2014 Dupnitsa (BUL): Russia,Czech Republic,Greece
5. 2016 Pardubice (CZE): Netherlands,Russia,Czech Republic
6. 2018 Trnava (SVK): Italy,Netherlands,Ireland
7. 2020 Kunovice (CZE): Italy,Czech Republic,Netherlands

VII. Kunovice (CZE) - 2018 June 26 - July 2 (game results) 1. Italy (ITA) 2. Czech Republic (CZE) 3. Netherlands (NED) 4. Spain (ESP) 5. France (FRA) 6. Germany (GER) 7. Ireland (IRL) 8. Ukraine (UKR) 9. Great Britain (GBR) 10. Austria (AUT) 11. Israel (ISR) 12. Poland (POL) 13. Belgium (BEL) 14. Slovakia (SVK) 15. Sweden (SWE) 16. Hungary (HUN) 17. Croatia (CRO)

VI. Trnava (SVK) - 2018 July 23–28 (game results) 1.Italy (ITA) 2.Netherlands (NED) 3.Ireland (IRL) 4.Great Britain (GBR) 5.Russia (RUS) 6.Czech Republic (CZE) 7.Belgium (BEL) 8.Poland (POL) 9.Greece (GRE) 10.Slovakia (SVK) 11.Ukraine (UKR) 12.Switzerland (SUI) 13.Israel (ISR) 14.Austria (AUT) 15.Hungary (HUN) 16.Turkey (TUR) 17.Lithuania (LTU)

V. Pardubice (CZE) - 2016 July 4–10 (game results) 1.Netherlands (NED) 2.Russia (RUS) 3.Czech Republic (CZE) 4.Slovakia (SVK) 5.Poland (POL) 6.Greece (GRE) 7.Ukraine (UKR) 8.Lithuania (LTU)

IV. Dupnitsa (BUL) - 2014 July 7–12 (game results) 1. Russia (RUS) 2. Czech Republic (CZE) 3. Greece (GRE) 4. Bulgaria (BUL) 5. Ukraine (UKR) 6. Slovakia (SVK) 7. Poland (POL)

III. Havlíčkův Brod (CZE) - 2012 July 10–14 (game results) 1. Russia (RUS) 2. Czech Republic (CZE) 3. France (FRA) 4. Poland (POL) 5. Ukraine (UKR) 6. Slovakia (SVK) 7. Bulgaria (BUL)

II. Prague (CZE) - 2010 August 2–7 1. Czech Republic (CZE) 2. Italy (ITA) 3. Russia (RUS) 4. Sweden (SWE) 5. France (FRA) 6. Poland (POL) 7. Ukraine (UKR)

I. Turin (ITA) - 2008 July 28 - August 2 1. Italy (ITA) 2. Russia (RUS) 3. Spain (ESP) 4. Czech Republic (CZE) 5. Ukraine (UKR) 6. France (FRA) 7. Greece (GRE) 8. Croatia (CRO)

=== U-15 Women's Softball European Championship - Past Results ===
Past results of the U-15 Women's Softball European Championship since the first one in Collecchio, Italy, in 2002.

From 2002 to 2018, the age group was U-16.

XI. Enschede (NED) - 2022 July 18–23 (game results) 1. Czech Republic (CZE) 2. Italy (ITA) 3. Netherlands (NED) 4. Ukraine (UKR) 5. Germany (GER) 6. France (FRA) 7. Lithuania (LTU) 8. Croatia (CRO) 9. Great Britain (GBR)

X. Zagreb (CRO) - 2019 July 29 - August 3 (game results) 1. NETHERLANDS (NED) 2. ITALY (ITA) 3. CZECH REPUBLIC (CZE) 4. RUSSIA (RUS) 5. UKRAINE (UKR) 6. GERMANY (GER) 7. FRANCE (FRA) 8. CROATIA (CRO) 9. BELGIUM (BEL) 10. POLAND (POL) 11. SLOVAKIA (SVK) 12. HUNGARY (HUN) 13. TURKEY (TUR)

IX. Ostrava (CZE) - 2017 July 10–15 (game results) 1. NETHERLANDS (NED) 2. CZECH REPUBLIC (CZE) 3. ITALY (ITA) 4. GERMANY (GER) 5. GREAT BRITAIN (GBR) 6. RUSSIA (RUS) 7. UKRAINE (UKR) 8. FRANCE (FRA) 9. BELGIUM (BEL) 10. SLOVAKIA (SVK) 11. SERBIA (SRB) 12. POLAND (POL)

VIII. Nuoro (ITA) - 2015 June 29 - July 4 (game results) 1. ITALY (ITA) 2. CZECH REPUBLIC (CZE) 3. RUSSIA (RUS) 4. GREAT BRITAIN (GBR) 5. BELGIUM (BEL) 6. SPAIN (ESP)

VII. Ostrava (CZE) - 2013 August 5–10 (game results) 1. RUSSIA (RUS) 2. CZECH REPUBLIC (CZE) 3. NETHERLANDS (NED) 4. BELGIUM (BEL) 5. GERMANY (GER) 6. GREAT BRITAIN (GBR) 7. POLAND (POL) 8. SLOVAKIA (SVK) 9. ROMANIA (ROM) 10. SERBIA (SRB) 11. UKRAINE (UKR) 12. LITHUANIA (LTU)

VI. Deurne/Antwerp (BEL) - 2011 August 8–13 (game results) 1. NETHERLANDS (NED) 2. RUSSIA (RUS) 3. ITALY (ITA) 4. BELGIUM (BEL) 5. SPAIN (ESP) 6. CZECH REPUBLIC (CZE) 7. GREAT BRITAIN (GBR) 8. GERMANY (GER) 9. SLOVAKIA (SVK) 10. SERBIA (SRB) 11. FRANCE (FRA)

V. Alkmaar (NED) - 2009 July 13–18 1. RUSSIA (RUS) 2. NETHERLANDS (NED) 3. SPAIN (ESP) 4. CZECH REPUBLIC (CZE) 5. GREAT BRITAIN (GBR) 6. SLOVAKIA (SVK) 7. BELGIUM (BEL)

IV. Plzeň (CZE) - 2007 July 9–14 1. NETHERLANDS (NED) 2. CZECH REPUBLIC (CZE) 3. RUSSIA (RUS) 4. POLAND (POL) 5. SPAIN (ESP) 6. SLOVAKIA (SVK) 7. GREECE (GRE) 8. UKRAINE (UKR) 9. GREAT BRITAIN (GBR)

III. Tuchkovo - Moscow Region (RUS) - 2005 July 11–16 1. CZECH REPUBLIC (CZE) 2. NETHERLANDS (NED) 3. RUSSIA (RUS) 4. POLAND (POL) 5. ROMANIA (ROM) 6. GREECE (GRE) 7. UKRAINE (UKR)

II. Prague (CZE) - 2003 August 11–16 1. ITALY (ITA) 2. CZECH REPUBLIC (CZE) 3. RUSSIA (RUS) 4. SLOVAKIA (SVK) 5. GREAT BRITAIN (GBR) 6. FRANCE (FRA)

I. Collecchio (ITA) - 2002 August 18–24 1. CZECH REPUBLIC (CZE) 2. RUSSIA (RUS) 3. ITALY (ITA) 4. SLOVAKIA (SVK) 5. GREAT BRITAIN (GBR) 6. ROMANIA (ROM) 7. FRANCE (FRA)

=== U-13 Women's Softball European Championship - Past Results ===
Past results of the U-13 Women's Softball European Championship since the first one in Collecchio, Italy, in 2002.

V. Ankara (TUR) - 2010 July 6–10 1. Russia (RUS) 2. Serbia (SRB) 3. Great Britain (GBR) 4. Turkey (TUR)

IV. Prague (CZE) - 2008 August 19–23 1. Netherlands (NED) 2. Russia (RUS) 3. Czech Republic (CZE) 4. Great Britain (GBR)

III. Mlade Buky (CZE) - 2006 August 1–5 1. CZECH REPUBLIC (CZE) 2. RUSSIA (RUS) 3. GREAT BRITAIN (GBR) 4. SLOVAKIA (SVK) 5. POLAND (POL)

II. Collecchio (ITA) - 2004 August 24–28 1. ITALY (ITA) 2. CZECH REPUBLIC (CZE) 3. RUSSIA (RUS) 4. ROMANIA (ROM) 5. POLAND (POL) 6. GREAT BRITAIN (GBR)

I. Collecchio (ITA) - 2002 August 18–24 1. ITALY (ITA) 2. CZECH REPUBLIC (CZE) 3. RUSSIA (RUS) 4. SLOVAKIA (SVK) 5. ROMANIA (ROM)

== See also ==
- ESF Women's Championship
- ESF Junior Boys Championship
