= Erika Piancastelli =

Italian–American softball player

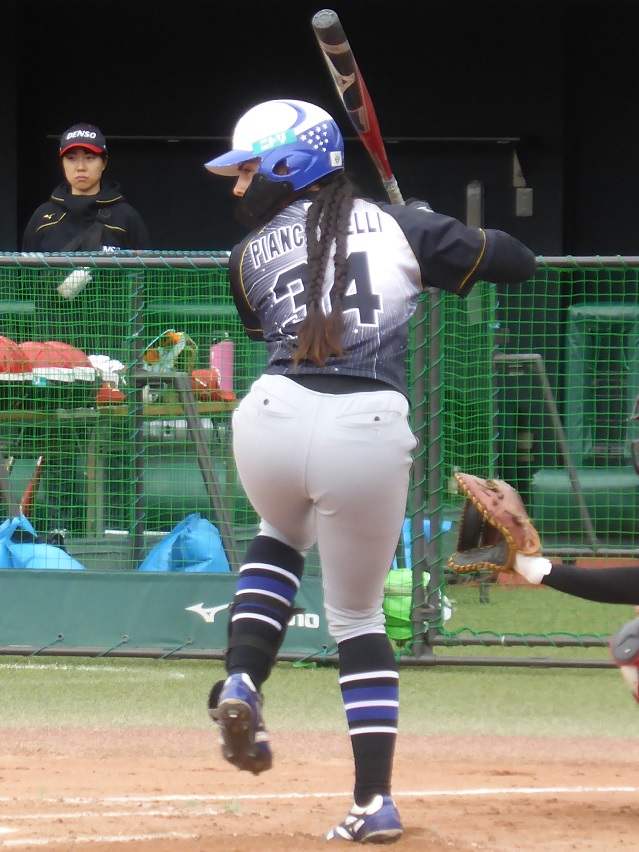
- Piancastelli in 2023

El Águila de Veracruz – No. 20
- Catcher/third baseman
- Born: June 20, 1996 (age 30); Modena, Emilia-Romagna, Italy
- Bats: Right Throws: Right

Teams
- McNeese State Cowgirls (2014–2017); Italian National Team (2016–present); SGH Galaxy Stars (2022–2024); Volts (2025–present); El Águila de Veracruz (2026–present)
Medals
Women's softball
Representing Italy
Women's Softball European Championship
Gold medal – first place	2019 Ostrava	Team
Gold medal – first place	2021 Castions di Strada	Team
Silver medal – second place	2017 Bollate	Team

Erika Piancastelli (born June 20, 1996) is an Italian-American professional softball player for the El Águila de Veracruz of the Mexican Softball League. She plays international softball for Italy and competed in the 2020 Summer Olympics. Born in Italy, Piancastelli eventually went to play college softball at McNeese State, where she holds multiple career records.

She is the Southland Conference leader in RBIs, home runs, doubles, slugging percentage and walks, and was the four-time conference Player of The Year. She is one of the NCAA Division I softball hitters to record a .400 batting average, 200 RBI, 75 home runs and an .800 slugging career. She played in the inaugural season of Athletes Unlimited Softball league.

== Early life and education ==
Born in Modena, Italy, Piancastelli moved to Carlsbad, California with her family at age five. Her mother is Loredana Auletta, an Italian softball player who competed as a catcher and third baseman on Italy's 2000 Summer Olympic team. Erika graduated from Carlsbad High School in 2014. She attended McNeese State University in Lake Charles, Louisiana. With the McNeese State Cowgirls softball team, she debuted on February 6, 2015, in a win against Florida Gulf Coast, with a 2/4 performance with a double and a RBI. She would earn conference Freshman and Player of The Year accolades and was recognized Third Team All-American by the National Fastpitch Coaches Association after leading the team in hits, average, RBIs, home runs, doubles and slugging, the homers were a new school record and her hits and average career bests. On March 6, Piancastelli hit two home runs to drive in a career-best 5 RBIs against the Sam Houston State Bearkats.

In her sophomore campaign, Piancastelli earned her second conference and NFCA honors. She broke the school records for home runs, slugging and walks, all career highs, the latter stat also set the conference standard. Beginning on March 3–18, the cowgirl went on an 11-consecutive-game hit streak batting: .469 (15/32) with 18 RBIs, 6 home runs, four doubles, 6 walks and slugging 1.687%. Later, she would set a single game McNeese record with 5 walks on April 16, in a defeat of the Northwestern State Demons. She would achieve a second single-game highlight for hits with a perfect day at the plate on May 13 against the Lamar Cardinals, with a 4/4 performance.

As a junior, she earned her third Player of The Year for the Southland and set a career best with 26 stolen bases. Piancastelli joined an elite club by collecting her 50th career home run in only her third year on April 21 vs. the Lamar Cardinals, striking off pitcher Amie Cisneros for an eventual victory. For a final year, Piancastelli was awarded her fourth and last Player of The Year honor. She set her last records with career-best RBIs and doubles. On April 27, Piancastelli tallied her 200th career RBI in a 5–0 win over the Stephen F. Austin Lumberjacks, hitting a solo home run in the first inning.

Piancastelli currently owns nearly all offensive career records for the Cowgirls, not including hits and triples. She is the Southland leader in RBIs, home runs, doubles, slugging and walks. In all of the NCAA, she ranks 7th in walks and slugging for her career.

== Career ==
=== Team Italy ===
Piancastelli competed at the Tokyo Games for Team Italy. She had two hits and drove in a run for the team that ended up placing sixth at the games. Piancastelli followed in the footsteps of her mother Loredana Auletta, who competed in 2000 for Italy softball.

=== Athletes Unlimited ===
On January 29, 2025, Piancastelli was drafted twenty-ninth overall by the Volts in the inaugural Athletes Unlimited Softball League draft.

=== El Águila de Veracruz ===
Piancastelli signed with El Águila de Veracruz of the Mexican Softball League ahead of the 2026 season.

== Statistics ==
McNeese State Cowgirls
YEAR	G	AB	R	H	BA	RBI	HR	3B	2B	TB	SLG	BB	SO	SB	SBA
2015	55	158	49	68	.430	54	18	1	19	143	.905%	35	18	17	21
2016	57	145	65	62	.427	49	22	1	15	145	1.000%	69	17	11	14
2017	61	160	56	60	.375	49	13	1	8	109	.681%	63	18	26	31
2018	62	168	58	63	.375	60	22	1	20	151	.899%	62	22	16	22
TOTALS	235	631	228	253	.401	212	75	4	62	548	.868%	229	75	70	88

Athletes Unlimited Softball
YEAR	G	AB	R	H	BA	RBI	HR	3B	2B	TB	SLG	BB	SO	SB
2020	15	52	9	17	.327	15	9	0	2	46	.884%	3	7	0

== Links ==
- NCAA Division I softball career .400 batting average list
- NCAA Division I softball career 200 RBIs list
- NCAA Division I softball career 50 home runs list
