= Belgium women's national softball team =

The Belgium women's national softball team is the softball team representing Belgium in international games and tournaments.

It is governed by the Koninklijke Belgische Baseball- en Softbalbond (Royal Belgian Baseball- and Softball Federation) and participates in international tournaments of the supranational softball organisations ESF and ISF, like the European championship and the world championship. As of 2013, the team attended one world championship and 15 European championships. In the first seven European softball tournaments, the Belgian team earned five medals.

== World Championship ==
The team competed at the 1994 ISF Women's World Championship in St. John's, Newfoundland where they finished thirteenth.

Year	Place	Pld	W	L	PF	PA
(New Zealand) 1965	did not qualify					
(Japan) 1967	did not qualify					
(United States) 1974	did not qualify					
(El Salvador) 1978	did not qualify					
(Taiwan) 1982	did not qualify					
(New Zealand) 1986	did not qualify					
(United States) 1990	did not qualify					

Year	Place	Pld	W	L	PF	PA
(Canada) 1994	13	6	3	3	31	34
(Japan) 1998	did not qualify					
(Canada) 2002	did not qualify					
(Soviet Union) 2006	did not qualify					
(Venezuela) 2010	did not qualify					
(Canada) 2012	did not qualify					
(Netherlands) 2014	did not qualify					

Year	Place	Pld	W	L	PF	PA
(Canada) 2016	did not qualify					
(Japan) 2018	did not qualify					
(United States) 2022	did not qualify					
(Italy) 2024	did not qualify					
(Australia) 2027						
Total	1/18	6	3	3	31	34

== European Championship ==
Year	Place	Pld	W	L	PF	PA
(Italy) 1979	3					
(Netherlands) 1981	4					
(Italy) 1983	3					
(Belgium) 1984	3					
(Belgium) 1986	3					
(Denmark) 1988	4					
(Italy) 1990	2					
(Netherlands) 1992	5					
(Italy) 1995	4					

Year	Place	Pld	W	L	PF	PA
(Czech Republic) 1997	5					
(Belgium) 1999	6					
(Czech Republic) 2001	8					
(Italy) 2003	7					
(Czech Republic) 2005	10					
(Netherlands) 2007	did not qualify					
(Spain) 2009	did not qualify					
(Italy) 2011	10	7	4	3	42	46
(Czech Republic) 2013	11	4	2	2		

Year	Place	Pld	W	L	PF	PA
(Netherlands) 2015	did not qualify					
(Italy) 2017	14	5	3	2		
(Czech Republic) 2019	14	9	4	5	51	71
(Italy) 2021	did not qualify					
(Spain) 2022	16	10	5	5	88	57
(Netherlands) 2024	11	12	3	9	42	81
(Czech Republic) 2025	13	6	5	1	64	36
Total	21/25	-	-	-	-	-

Red border colour indicates tournament was held on home soil.
