= Soviet Union women's national softball team =

Nation Softball team of the Soviet Union

Soviet Union women's national softball team is the national team for the Soviet Union. A representative for the team attended the 1990 ISF Women's World Championship in Normal, Illinois in advance of plans to compete at the next World Championships.
