= Israel women's national softball team =

Information
- Country: Israel
- Federation: Israel Softball Association
- Confederation: WBSC Europe
- Manager: Nikki Patrice Palmer
- WBSC World Rank: 20 ▲1 (31 December 2025)

The Israeli Women's National Softball Team is the national team of Israel. It is governed by the Israel Softball Association.

Israel Softball announced in 2019 that they were to build a "Dream Team" in order to try to qualify for the Olympics. That year they placed 9th in the Women's Softball European Championship.

In 2020, they announced they were going to continue their run with coaches Corey Vyner, of Israel Softball, and Nikki Palmer, Head Coach of California Riverside.

== Results ==
Women's Softball European Championships

Year	2003	2005	2007	2009	2011	2013	2017	2019	2021	2022	2024	2025
Standing	17th	17th	14th	14th	16th	17th	21st	9th	4th	6th	9th	7th

== Notable players ==
- Tamara Statman Schoen
