= Lithuania women's national softball team =

Lithuania

Information
- Country: Lithuania
- Federation: Lithuanian Baseball Association
- Confederation: WBSC Europe
- WBSC World Rank: 45th

The Lithuania women's national softball team is the national team of the Lithuania. It is governed by the Lietuvos beisbolo asociacija. Team coached by Romanas Paskočimas.

== Results ==
World Championship

Year	1990	1994	1998	2002	2006	2010	2012	2014	2018
Standing	nc	nc	nc	nc	nc	nc	nc	nc	nc

nc = not competed

European Championship

Year	1990	1992	1995	1997	1999	2001	2003	2005	2007	2009	2011	2013	2015	2017	2019	2021	2022	2024	2025
Standing	nc	nc	nc	nc	nc	nc	nc	nc	nc	nc	nc	nc	nc	23rd	21st	17th	nc	nc	20th

nc = not competed

ESF Junior Girls Championship

Year	1991	1993	1994	1996	1998	2000	2002	2004	2006	2008	2010	2012	2014
Standing	nc	nc	nc	nc	nc	nc	nc	nc	nc	nc	nc	15th	8th

nc = not competed

== Team ==
Player	Club
Nomeda Neverauskaitė	(Lithuania) BK Vilnius
Aistė Kvasaitė	(Lithuania) BK Radviliškis Bėgiai
Aistė Vaišnoraitė	(Lithuania) BK Kaunas Lituanica
Dorota Augulevičiūtė	(Lithuania) BK Vilnius
Vilma Stašauskaitė	(Lithuania) BK Radviliškis Bėgiai
Gabija Venslovaitė	(Lithuania) BK Radviliškis Bėgiai
Kamilija Šiurnaitė	(Lithuania) BK Radviliškis Bėgiai
Augustė Tomaševičiūtė	(Lithuania) BK Vilnius
Eigilė Daknytė	(Lithuania) BK Radviliškis Bėgiai
Gintarė Paskočimaitė	(Lithuania) BK Radviliškis Bėgiai
Goda Karenauskaitė	(Lithuania) BK Radviliškis Bėgiai
Guoda Aleksandravičiūtė	(Lithuania) BK Vilnius
Akvilė Barzdžiūtė	(Lithuania) BK Vilnius
Miglė Paskočimaitė	(Lithuania) BK Radviliškis Bėgiai
Simona Adomavičiūtė	(Lithuania) BK Radviliškis Bėgiai
Nerita Žukauskaitė	(Lithuania) BK Radviliškis Bėgiai
Emilija Aleknaitė	(Lithuania) BK Radviliškis Bėgiai
Austėja Norvaišaitė	(Lithuania) BK Radviliškis Bėgiai
Ugnė Kučinskaitė	(Lithuania) BK Utena Vėtra
Laura Stankevičiūtė	(Lithuania) BK Vilnius
Agnė Pupininkaitė	(Lithuania) BK Vilnius
Paula Petkevič	(Lithuania) BK Vilnius
Monika Vodzinskaitė	(Lithuania) BK Vilnius
Greta Barzdžiūtė	(Lithuania) BK Vilnius
Nerita Povilauskaitė	(Lithuania) BK Radviliškis Bėgiai
