= Greece women's national softball team =

Greece women's national softball team is the national team for Greece. The team competed at the 2006 ISF Women's World Championship in Beijing, China where they finished ninth. The team is currently coached by Jay Nelson.
