= Russia women's national softball team =

Russia women's national softball team is the national team for Russia. The team competed at the 2002 ISF Women's World Championship in Saskatoon, Saskatchewan where they finished thirteenth.
