= Sweden women's national softball team =

Sweden women's national softball team is the national team for Sweden. The team competed at the 1994 ISF Women's World Championship in St. John's, Newfoundland where they finished sixteenth.
