= Slovakia women's national softball team =

The Slovakia women's national softball team is the national team of the Slovakia. It is governed by the Slovenska Softballova Asociacia.

== Results ==
World Championship

Year	1994	1998	2002	2006	2010	2012	2014
Standing	nc	nc	nc	nc	nc	nc	nc

nc = not competed

European Championship

Year	1995	1997	1999	2001	2003	2005	2007	2009	2011	2013	2015	2017	2019	2021	2022	2024	2025
Standing	9th	11th	14th	11th	12th	11th	8th	10th	12th	10th	16th	17th	19th	13th	12th	15th	19th

nc = not competed
