= Germany women's national softball team =

Information
- Country: Germany
- Federation: German Baseball and Softball Federation
- Confederation: WBSC Europe
- Manager: Udo Dehmel
- WBSC World Rank: 19 ▲1 (31 December 2025)

The Germany women's national softball team is the national team of the Germany. It is governed by the German Baseball and Softball Federation.

== Results ==
World Championship

Year	1990	1994	1998	2002	2006	2010	2012	2014
Standing	nc	nc	nc	nc	nc	nc	nc	nc

nc = not competed

European Championship

Year	1979	1981	1983	1984	1986	1988	1990	1992	1995	1997	1999	2001	2003	2005	2007	2009	2011	2013	2015	2017	2019	2021	2022	2024	2025
Standing	nc	nc	nc	nc	5th	9th	8th	8th	11th	13th	8th	6th	9th	7th	7th	5th	9th	9th	7th	11th	10th	7th	8th	8th	8th

nc = not competed

ESF Junior Girls Championship

Year	1991	1993	1994	1996	1998	2000	2002	2004	2006	2008	2010	2012	2014
Standing	nc	8th	nc	7th	5th	7th	5th	5th	4th	5th	Silver	Silver	9th

nc = not competed
