= France women's national softball team =

France women's national softball team is the national team for France. The team competed at the 1994 ISF Women's World Championship in St. John's, Newfoundland where they finished twenty-first.
