= Spain women's national softball team =

Information
- Country: Spain
- Federation: Royal Spanish Baseball and Softball Federation
- Confederation: WBSC Europe
- WBSC World Rank: 13 (31 December 2024)

Women's Softball World Cup
- Appearances: 2 (First in 1994)
- Best result: 13th

Spain women's national softball team is the national team for Spain. The team competed at the 1994 ISF Women's World Championship in St. John's, Newfoundland where they finished twentieth.
