= 2024 Women's Softball World Cup Finals =

Softball competition

The 2024 Women's Softball World Cup Finals was a round-robin tournament of the 2024 Women's Softball World Cup which took place from 15 to 20 July. The top two teams from each pool qualified for the top eight finals stage along with two wildcards. The eight teams were split into two groups with the top two qualifying for the super round. After the super round the top two teams then qualified for the final.

== Qualified teams ==
Pool	Final winners	Repechage winners	Wildcard
A	United States	Australia	
B	Japan	Canada	Italy
C	Puerto Rico	Netherlands	China

== Group A ==
Pos	Team	Pld	W	L	RF	RA	RD	PCT	GB	Qualification
1	United States	3	3	0	18	2	+16	1.000	—	Advance to Super Round
2	Canada	3	2	1	14	11	+3	.667	1	Advance to Super Round
3	Italy (H)	3	1	2	10	12	−2	.333	2	Advance to Placement Round
4	China	3	0	3	2	19	−17	.000	3	Advance to Placement Round

Source: WBSC
Rules for classification: 1) Wins/losses; 2) Head to head; 3) Head to head runs against; 4) Runs against; 5) Head to head
(H) Hosts

Date	Local time	Road team	Score	Home team	Inn.	Venue	Game duration	Attendance	Boxscore
15 July 2024	16:30	Canada	2–5	United States	7	Campo Comunale da Softball	2:00	180	Boxscore
15 July 2024	20:30	China	0–6	Italy	7	Campo Comunale da Softball	1:44	2,000	Boxscore
16 July 2024	14:00	China	2–7	Canada	7	Campo Comunale da Softball	2:11	150	Boxscore
16 July 2024	20:30	Italy	0–7	United States	5	Campo Comunale da Softball	1:39	2,300	Boxscore
17 July 2024	14:00	United States	6–0	China	7	Campo Comunale da Softball	2:21	200	Boxscore
17 July 2024	20:30	Italy	4–5	Canada	7	Campo Comunale da Softball	2:05	2,100	Boxscore

=== Matches ===
==== Canada vs United States ====
15 July 2024 16:30 Campo Comunale da Softball
Team	1	2	3	4	5	6	7	R	H	E
Canada	1	0	1	0	0	0	0	2	3	1
United States	0	0	0	1	1	3	X	5	5	1
WP: Kelly Maxwell LP: Dawn Bodrug; Attendance: 180; Boxscore

==== China vs Italy ====
15 July 2024 20:30 Campo Comunale da Softball
Team	1	2	3	4	5	6	7	R	H	E
China	0	0	0	0	0	0	0	0	5	0
Italy	2	0	0	0	0	4	X	6	9	0
WP: Alice Nicolini LP: Yinan Chai; Home runs: CHN: None; ITA: McKenzie Barbara; Attendance: 2,000; Boxscore

==== China vs Canada ====
16 July 2024 14:00 Campo Comunale da Softball
Team	1	2	3	4	5	6	7	R	H	E
China	0	0	0	0	1	0	0	2	6	2
Canada	0	0	0	4	0	3	X	7	12	1
WP: Sara Groenewegen LP: Yinan Chan Sv: Kaite Korstrom; Home runs: CHN: None; CAN: Kelsey Harshman; Attendance: 150; Boxscore

==== Italy vs United States ====
16 July 2024 20:30 Campo Comunale da Softball
Team	1	2	3	4	5	6	7	R	H	E
Italy	0	0	0	0	0	X	X	0	2	1
United States (5)	1	1	1	0	4	X	X	7	9	0
WP: Megan Faraimo LP: Christina Toniolo; Home runs: ITA: None; USA: Jessie Warren; Attendance: 2,300; Boxscore

==== United States vs China ====
17 July 2024 14:00 Campo Comunale da Softball
Team	1	2	3	4	5	6	7	R	H	E
United States	2	2	1	0	0	0	1	6	9	1
China	0	0	0	0	0	0	0	0	1	0
WP: Ally Carda LP: Yinan Chai Sv: Rachel Garcia; Attendance: 200; Boxscore

==== Italy vs Canada ====
17 July 2024 20:30 Campo Comunale da Softball
Team	1	2	3	4	5	6	7	R	H	E
Italy	0	1	2	0	0	1	0	4	7	1
Canada	0	2	0	1	0	0	2	5	11	3
WP: Sara Groenewegen LP: Alexia Lacatena; Attendance: 2,100; Boxscore

== Group B ==
Pos	Team	Pld	W	L	RF	RA	RD	PCT	GB	Qualification
1	Japan	3	3	0	15	3	+12	1.000	—	Advance to Super Round
2	Netherlands	3	2	1	12	7	+5	.667	1	Advance to Super Round
3	Puerto Rico	3	1	2	6	12	−6	.333	2	Advance to Placement Round
4	Australia	3	0	3	3	14	−11	.000	3	Advance to Placement Round

Source: WBSC
Rules for classification: 1) Wins/losses; 2) Head to head; 3) Head to head runs against; 4) Runs against; 5) Head to head

Date	Local time	Road team	Score	Home team	Inn.	Venue	Game duration	Attendance	Boxscore
15 July 2024	11:00	Australia	0–3	Japan	7	Campo Comunale da Softball	1:55	300	Boxscore
15 July 2024	14:00	Puerto Rico	1–3	Netherlands	7	Campo Comunale da Softball	2:02	200	Boxscore
16 July 2024	11:00	Japan	8–0	Puerto Rico	5	Campo Comunale da Softball	1:32	200	Boxscore
16 July 2024	17:30	Netherlands	6–2	Australia	7	Campo Comunale da Softball	2:44	500	Boxscore
17 July 2024	11:00	Netherlands	3–4	Japan	7	Campo Comunale da Softball	2:200	300	Boxscore
17 July 2024	17:30	Australia	1–5	Puerto Rico	7	Campo Comunale da Softball	2:28	300	Boxscore

=== Matches ===
==== Australia vs Japan ====
15 July 2024 11:00 Campo Comunale da Softball
Team	1	2	3	4	5	6	7	R	H	E
Australia	0	0	0	0	0	0	0	0	5	3
Japan	0	0	0	2	0	1	X	3	7	0
WP: Miu Goto LP: Kandra Lamb Sv: Sakura Miwa; Attendance: 300; Boxscore

==== Puerto Rico vs Netherlands ====
15 July 2024 14:00 Campo Comunale da Softball
Team	1	2	3	4	5	6	7	R	H	E
Puerto Rico	0	0	1	0	0	0	0	1	4	1
Netherlands	2	0	0	1	0	0	X	3	6	0
WP: Lisa Hop LP: Aleshia Ocasio Sv: J'Dah Girigorie; Attendance: 200; Boxscore

==== Japan vs Puerto Rico ====
16 July 2024 11:00 Campo Comunale da Softball
Team	1	2	3	4	5	6	7	R	H	E
Japan (5)	2	0	0	4	2	X	X	8	14	1
Puerto Rico	0	0	0	0	0	X	X	0	1	1
WP: Sakura Miwa LP: Taran Valvelo Sv: Mio Sakamoto; Home runs: JPN: Ayane Nakagawa; PUR: None; Attendance: 200; Boxscore

==== Netherlands vs Australia ====
16 July 2024 17:30 Campo Comunale da Softball
Team	1	2	3	4	5	6	7	R	H	E
Netherlands	0	0	2	0	2	0	2	6	8	1
Australia	0	0	0	2	0	0	0	2	9	1
WP: Marjolein Merxx LP: Kaia Parnaby Sv: J'dah Catherine Genevieve Girigorie; Home runs: NED: Dinet Oosting; AUS: None; Attendance: 500; Boxscore

==== Netherlands vs Japan ====
17 July 2024 11:00 Campo Comunale da Softball
Team	1	2	3	4	5	6	7	R	H	E
Netherlands	0	0	3	0	0	0	0	3	8	3
Japan	0	0	0	0	0	3	1	4	6	0
WP: Yukiko Ueno LP: Lisa Hop; Attendance: 300; Boxscore

==== Australia vs Puerto Rico ====
17 July 2024 17:30 Campo Comunale da Softball
Team	1	2	3	4	5	6	7	R	H	E
Australia	0	0	0	0	0	0	1	1	5	1
Puerto Rico	1	0	2	2	0	0	X	5	8	2
WP: Aleshia Ocasio LP: Ellen Roberts; Attendance: 300; Boxscore

== Placement Round ==
Pos	Team	Pld	W	L	RF	RA	RD	PCT	GB
1	China	3	2	1	9	9	0	.667	—
2	Puerto Rico	3	2	1	14	11	+3	.667	—
3	Australia	3	1	2	6	11	−5	.333	1
4	Italy (H)	3	1	2	13	11	+2	.333	1

First match(es) will be played: 18 July 2024. Source: WBSC
Rules for classification: 1) Wins/losses; 2) Head to head; 3) Head to head runs against; 4) Runs against; 5) Head to head
(H) Hosts

Date	Local time	Road team	Score	Home team	Inn.	Venue	Game duration	Attendance	Boxscore
18 July 2024	11:00	China	5–2	Australia	10	Campo Comunale da Softball	2:53	150	Boxscore
18 July 2024	14:00	Puerto Rico	8–6	Italy	9	Campo Comunale da Softball	2:53	1,600	Boxscore
19 July 2024	11:00	China	4–1	Puerto Rico	8	Campo Comunale da Softball	2:18	100	Boxscore
19 July 2024	14:00	Australia	3–1	Italy	7	Campo Comunale da Softball	2:16	2,400	Boxscore

=== Matches ===
==== China vs Australia ====
18 July 2024 11:00 Campo Comunale da Softball
Team	1	2	3	4	5	6	7	8	9	10	R	H	E
China (10)	1	0	0	0	0	0	0	0	1	3	5	8	0
Australia	0	0	0	0	1	0	0	0	1	0	2	4	3
WP: Yinan Chai LP: Kaia Parnaby; Attendance: 150; Boxscore

==== Puerto Rico vs Italy ====
18 July 2024 14:00 Campo Comunale da Softball
Team	1	2	3	4	5	6	7	8	9	R	H	E
Puerto Rico (9)	0	2	0	0	0	2	0	1	3	8	13	0
Italy	2	0	1	0	1	0	0	1	1	6	12	3
WP: Aleshia Ocasio LP: Ilaria Cacciamani; Home runs: PUR: Camille Ortiz-Martinez; ITA: None; Attendance: 1,600; Boxscore

==== China vs Puerto Rico ====
19 July 2024 11:00 Campo Comunale da Softball
Team	1	2	3	4	5	6	7	8	R	H	E
China (8)	1	0	0	0	0	0	0	3	4	9	1
Puerto Rico	0	0	1	0	0	0	0	0	1	6	0
WP: Yinan Chai LP: Aleshia Ocasio; Attendance: 100; Boxscore

==== Australia vs Italy ====
19 July 2024 14:00 Campo Comunale da Softball
Team	1	2	3	4	5	6	7	R	H	E
Australia	0	0	0	0	0	1	2	3	8	0
Italy	1	0	0	0	0	0	0	1	5	1
WP: Ellen Roberts LP: Alice Nicolini; Attendance: 2,400; Boxscore

== Super Round ==
Pos	Team	Pld	W	L	RF	RA	RD	PCT	GB	Qualification
1	United States	3	3	0	14	2	+12	1.000	—	Advance to Final
2	Japan	3	2	1	11	7	+4	.667	1	Advance to Final
3	Canada	3	1	2	10	15	−5	.333	2	Advance to Third place play-off
4	Netherlands	3	0	3	6	17	−11	.000	3	Advance to Third place play-off

Source: WBSC
Rules for classification: 1) Wins/losses; 2) Head to head; 3) Head to head runs against; 4) Runs against; 5) Head to head

Date	Local time	Road team	Score	Home team	Inn.	Venue	Game duration	Attendance	Boxscore
18 July 2024	11:00	United States	2–0	Japan	7	Campo Comunale da Softball	1:50	450	Boxscore
18 July 2024	17:30	Netherlands	3–6	Canada	7	Campo Comunale da Softball	2:30	500	Boxscore
19 July 2024	11:00	Canada	2–7	Japan	7	Campo Comunale da Softball	2:13	180	Boxscore
19 July 2024	17:30	Netherlands	0–7	United States	5	Campo Comunale da Softball	1:41	900	Boxscore

=== Matches ===
==== United States vs Japan ====
18 July 2024 11:00 Campo Comunale da Softball
Team	1	2	3	4	5	6	7	R	H	E
United States	0	0	0	0	2	0	0	2	4	1
Japan	0	0	0	0	0	0	0	0	3	1
WP: Megan Faraimo LP: Miu Goto; Attendance: 450; Boxscore

==== Netherlands vs Canada ====
18 July 2024 17:30 Campo Comunale da Softball
Team	1	2	3	4	5	6	7	R	H	E
Netherlands	0	0	0	0	0	3	0	3	5	0
Canada	1	0	0	1	0	0	4	6	9	2
WP: Dawn Bodrug LP: J'dah Catherine Genevieve; Home runs: NED: None; CAN: Callum Pilgrim, Larissa Franklin; Attendance: 500; Boxscore

==== Canada vs Japan ====
19 July 2024 11:00 Campo Comunale da Softball
Team	1	2	3	4	5	6	7	R	H	E
Canada	0	0	0	0	1	1	0	2	5	1
Japan	0	1	0	5	1	0	X	7	10	1
WP: Miu Goto LP: Dawn Bodrug Sv: Mio Sakamoto; Attendance: 180; Boxscore

==== Netherlands vs United States ====
19 July 2024 17:30 Campo Comunale da Softball
Team	1	2	3	4	5	6	7	R	H	E
Netherlands	0	0	0	0	0	X	X	0	0	2
United States (5)	2	3	0	0	2	X	X	7	10	0
WP: Kelly Maxwell LP: Lisa Hop; Home runs: NED: None; USA: Hannah Flippen; Attendance: 900; Boxscore

== Final Round ==
=== Third place play-off ===
20 July 2024 17:00 Campo Comunale da Softball
Team	1	2	3	4	5	6	7	8	9	10	11	R	H	E
Netherlands	0	0	5	0	0	0	0	1	0	1	0	7	9	0
Canada (11)	0	0	0	1	0	4	0	1	0	1	4	11	11	1
WP: Morgan Rackel LP: J'dah Catherine Genevieve Girigorie; Home runs: NED: Laura Wissink; CAN: Callum Pilgrim, Natalie Wideman; Attendance: 2,450; Boxscore

=== Final ===
20 July 2024 20:00 Campo Comunale da Softball
Team	1	2	3	4	5	6	7	R	H	E
Japan	0	2	0	4	0	0	0	6	11	0
United States	1	0	0	0	0	0	0	1	5	2
WP: Miu Goto LP: Kelly Maxwell Sv: Yukiko Ueno; Attendance: 2,500; Boxscore

=== Digital Awards ===
In the 2024 Women's Softball World Cup, the winning team received a blockchain-verified trophy, marking a pioneering approach to award verification. This trophy was issued and secured digitally, ensuring its authenticity through blockchain technology. The digital version of the trophy is accessible online for public viewing, providing fans and stakeholders with a transparent record of the accolade.
