= 2024 Women's Softball World Cup Group C =

Group C of the 2024 Women's Softball World Cup will take place from 22 to 26 July 2023 in Castions di Strada and Buttrio, Italy. The group consists of host nation Italy, Japan, Canada, Venezuela, New Zealand and Philippines. Japan and Canada advanced to the Finals to be held in 2024. Italy also advanced to the Finals as host/wildcard.

== Teams ==
Draw position	Team	Confederation	Method of qualification	Date of qualification	Finals appearance	Last appearance	Previous best performance	WBSC Rankings
C1	Italy	WBSC Europe	Hosts/European Championship third place	9 June 2022	14th	2022	Playoff round (1998, 2002, 2006, 2018)	8
C2	Japan	WBSC Asia	Asia Cup winners	6 April 2023	16th	2022	Winners (1970, 2012, 2014)	2
C3	Canada	WBSC Americas	Pan American Championship runners-up	19 November 2022	17th	2022	Runners-up (1978)	5
C4	Venezuela	WBSC Americas	Pan American Championship fifth place	20 November 2022	10th	2018	Playoff round (2006, 2016)	22
C5	New Zealand	WBSC Oceania	Oceania	Automatic (Oceania)	17th	2018	Winners (1982)	29
C6	Philippines	WBSC Asia	Asia Cup fourth place	6 April 2023	8th	2018	Third place (1970)	26

== Standings ==
Pos	Team	Pld	W	L	RF	RA	RD	PCT	GB	Qualification
1	Canada	5	4	1	22	13	+9	.800 (Note: Head to head result: Canada 6–5 Japan)	—	Advance to Group C Final
2	Japan	5	4	1	44	8	+36	.800	—	Advance to Group C Final
3	Italy (Note: Italy automatically qualify for the finals as hosts of that stage.) (H)	5	3	2	24	11	+13	.600	1	Advance to Group C third place play-off
4	Philippines	5	2	3	12	32	−20	.400	2	Advance to Group C third place play-off
5	New Zealand	5	1	4	9	37	−28	.200 (Note: Head to head result: New Zealand 4–3 Venezuela)	3	
6	Venezuela	5	1	4	12	22	−10	.200	3	

Source: WBSC
Rules for classification: 1) Wins/losses; 2) Head to head; 3) Head to head runs against; 4) Runs against; 5) Head to head
(H) Hosts

== Summary ==
All times listed are local, CEST (UTC+2).

Date	Local time	Road team	Score	Home team	Inn.	Venue	Game duration	Attendance	Boxscore
22 July 2023	14:00	New Zealand	2–16	Japan	4	Campo Comunale da Softball	700	1:32	Boxscore
22 July 2023	17:00	Philippines	0–5	Canada	7	Campo Comunale da Softball	700	1:44	Boxscore
22 July 2023	20:00	Venezuela	2–4	Italy	7	Campo Comunale da Softball	1,500	2:00	Boxscore
23 July 2023	11:00	Italy	9–0	New Zealand	7	Campo Cav. Gino Michelutti	300	2:20	Boxscore
23 July 2023	14:00	Venezuela	2–6	Canada	7	Campo Cav. Gino Michelutti	180	1:53	Boxscore
23 July 2023	17:00	Japan	13–0	Philippines	4	Campo Cav. Gino Michelutti	250	1:30	Boxscore
23 July 2023	20:00	Canada	1–6	Italy	7	Campo Cav. Gino Michelutti	600	1:42	Boxscore
24 July 2023	11:00	Philippines	1–5	Venezuela	7	Campo Cav. Gino Michelutti	100	1:44	Boxscore
24 July 2023	14:00	Canada	6–5	Japan	7	Campo Cav. Gino Michelutti	150	2:12	Boxscore
24 July 2023	17:00	New Zealand	4–3	Venezuela	7	Campo Cav. Gino Michelutti	200	2:08	Boxscore
24 July 2023	20:00	Italy	Suspended	Philippines		Campo Cav. Gino Michelutti			
25 July 2023	15:00	New Zealand	0–4	Canada	7	Campo de Baseball-Softball	80	1:41	Boxscore
25 July 2023	15:00	Venezuela	0–7	Japan	7	Campo Comunale da Softball	100	1:24	Boxscore
25 July 2023	17:00	Philippines	5–3	New Zealand	7	Campo da Baseball-Softball	75	2:07	Boxscore
25 July 2023	17:00	Japan	3–0	Italy	7	Campo Comunale da Softball	300	1:48	Boxscore
25 July 2023	20:30	Italy	5–6	Philippines	7	Campo Comunale da Softball	450	2:09	Boxscore

== Matches ==
All times listed are local, CEST (UTC+2).

=== New Zealand vs Japan ===
22 July 2023 14:00 Campo Comunale da Softball
Team	1	2	3	4	5	6	7	R	H	E
New Zealand (4)	0	2	0	0	X	X	X	2	3	2
Japan	8	8	0	X	X	X	X	16	12	0
WP: Misaki Katsumata LP: Loran Christine Parker; Boxscore

=== Philippines vs Canada ===
22 July 2023 17:00 Campo Comunale da Softball
Team	1	2	3	4	5	6	7	R	H	E
Philippines	0	0	0	0	0	0	0	0	5	0
Canada	0	0	3	1	1	0	X	5	8	0
WP: Dawn Megan Bodrug LP: Glory Alonzo Sv: Rackel Morgan; Boxscore

=== Venezuela vs Italy ===
22 July 2023 20:00 Campo Comunale da Softball
Team	1	2	3	4	5	6	7	R	H	E
Venezuela	0	0	0	0	0	2	0	2	3	1
Italy	1	0	0	0	3	0	X	4	8	0
WP: Alice Nicolini LP: Cassady Knudsen; Boxscore

=== Italy vs New Zealand ===
23 July 2023 11:00 Campo Cav. Gino Michelutti
Team	1	2	3	4	5	6	7	R	H	E
Italy	1	0	0	1	0	0	7	9	10	0
New Zealand	0	0	0	0	0	0	0	0	4	1
WP: Ilaria Cacciamani LP: Tyneesha Robyn Houkamau; Boxscore

=== Venezuela vs Canada ===
23 July 2023 14:00 Campo Cav. Gino Michelutti
Team	1	2	3	4	5	6	7	R	H	E
Venezuela	0	0	0	0	2	0	0	2	3	3
Canada	3	1	0	2	0	0	X	6	7	1
WP: Morgan Rackel LP: Loreley Francia Linares Sv: Samantha Ryan; Boxscore

=== Japan vs Philippines ===
23 July 2023 17:00 Campo Cav. Gino Michelutti
Team	1	2	3	4	5	6	7	R	H	E
Japan (4)	7	6	0	0	X	X	X	13	13	0
Philippines	0	0	0	0	X	X	X	0	4	1
WP: Yukiko Ueno LP: Celyn Ojare; Boxscore

=== Canada vs Italy ===
23 July 2023 20:00 Campo Cav. Gino Michelutti
Team	1	2	3	4	5	6	7	R	H	E
Canada	0	0	0	0	0	0	1	1	4	0
Italy	0	0	1	5	0	0	X	6	8	0
WP: Christina Toniolo LP: Dawn Megan Bodrug; Boxscore

=== Philippines vs Venezuela ===
24 July 2023 11:00 Campo Cav. Gino Michelutti
Team	1	2	3	4	5	6	7	R	H	E
Philippines	0	0	0	0	0	0	1	1	6	1
Venezuela	0	0	0	0	5	0	X	5	5	1
WP: Cassady Knudsen LP: Royevel Palma; Boxscore

=== Canada vs Japan ===
24 July 2023 14:00 Campo Cav. Gino Michelutti
Team	1	2	3	4	5	6	7	R	H	E
Canada	0	1	3	0	1	1	1	6	11	1
Japan	1	1	0	0	0	3	3	5	8	0
WP: Morgan Rackel LP: Miu Goto; Boxscore

=== New Zealand vs Venezuela ===
24 July 2023 17:00 Campo Cav. Gino Michelutti
Team	1	2	3	4	5	6	7	R	H	E
New Zealand	0	0	0	0	3	0	1	4	6	1
Venezuela	0	0	0	3	0	0	0	3	7	2
WP: Christine Loran Parker LP: Loreley Francia Linares; Boxscore

=== Italy vs Philippines Suspended ===
24 July 2023 20:00 Campo Cav. Gino Michelutti
Team	1	2	3	4	5	6	7	R	H	E
Italy	X	X	X	X	X	X	X	X	X	X
Philippines	X	X	X	X	X	X	X	X	X	X

=== New Zealand vs Canada ===
25 July 2023 8:00 Campo da Baseball-Softball
Team	1	2	3	4	5	6	7	R	H	E
New Zealand	0	0	0	0	0	0	0	0	3	0
Canada	1	0	2	1	0	0	X	4	8	1
WP: Dawn Megan Bodrug LP: Amy Begg; Boxscore

=== Venezuela vs Japan ===
25 July 2023 8:00 Campo Comunale da Softball
Team	1	2	3	4	5	6	7	R	H	E
Venezuela	0	0	0	0	0	X	X	0	0	2
Japan (5)	4	0	0	1	2	x	X	7	10	0
WP: Sakura Miwa LP: Loreley Francia Linares; Boxscore

=== Philippines vs New Zealand ===
25 July 2023 10:00 Campo da Baseball-Softball
Team	1	2	3	4	5	6	7	R	H	E
Philippines	2	0	2	0	0	0	1	5	9	0
New Zealand	2	0	0	1	0	0	0	3	6	0
WP: Royevel Palma LP: Tyneesha Robyn Houkamau; Boxscore

=== Japan vs Italy ===
25 July 2023 10:00 Campo Comunale da Softball
Team	1	2	3	4	5	6	7	R	H	E
Japan	0	1	1	1	0	0	0	3	6	1
Italy	0	0	0	0	0	0	0	0	3	0
WP: Miu Goto LP: Alice Nicolini Sv: Yukiko Ueno; Boxscore

=== Italy vs Philippines ===
25 July 2023 20:30 Campo Comunale da Softball
Team	1	2	3	4	5	6	7	R	H	E
Italy	1	0	0	0	3	1	0	5	7	2
Philippines	0	0	0	1	3	0	2	6	11	0
WP: Royevel Palma LP: Alice Nicolini; Boxscore

== Play-offs ==
The winner of the final and the repechage qualify for the 2024 finals.

=== Bracket ===
Final
26 July – Castions di Strada
Japan	7
Canada	1
Third place play-off
26 July – Castions di Strada
Philippines	5
Italy	6

Repechage
26 July – Castions di Strada
Italy
Canada

=== Summary ===
Round	Date	Local time	Road team	Score	Home team	Inn.	Venue	Game duration	Attendance	Boxscore
5th place match	26 July 2023	11:00	Venezuela	4–0	New Zealand	7	Campo Comunale da Softball	2:06	130	Boxscore
3rd place match	26 July 2023	14:00	Philippines	5–6	Italy	7	Campo Comunale da Softball	2:05	400	Boxscore
Final	26 July 2023	17:00	Japan	7–1	Canada	7	Campo Comunale da Softball	2:14	500	Boxscore
Repechage	26 July 2023	20:00	Italy	Canceled	Canada		Campo Comunale da Softball			

=== Fifth place play-off ===
26 July 2023 11:00 Campo Comunale da Softball
Team	1	2	3	4	5	6	7	R	H	E
Venezuela	0	0	0	0	4	0	0	4	6	0
New Zealand	0	0	0	0	0	0	0	0	5	2
WP: Michelle Floyd LP: Tyla Morrison; Boxscore

=== Third place play-off ===
26 July 2023 14:00 Campo Comunale da Softball
Team	1	2	3	4	5	6	7	R	H	E
Philippines	1	0	2	2	0	0	0	5	10	0
Italy	0	3	2	1	0	0	0	6	10	2
WP: Alice Nicolini LP: Royevel Palma; Boxscore

=== Final ===
26 July 2023 17:00 Campo Comunale da Softball
Team	1	2	3	4	5	6	7	R	H	E
Japan	0	4	0	0	1	0	2	7	13	0
Canada	0	0	1	0	0	0	0	1	3	3
WP: Yukiko Ueno LP: Sara Groenewegen; Boxscore

=== Repechage ===
Game was cancelled due to weather conditions.

26 July 2023 20:00 Campo Comunale da Softball
Team	1	2	3	4	5	6	7	R	H	E
Italy	X	X	X	X	X	X	X	X	X	X
Canada	X	X	X	X	X	X	X	X	X	X
