= 2024 Women's Softball World Cup Group A =

Group A of the 2024 Women's Softball World Cup will take place from 11 to 15 July 2023 in Balbriggan, Republic of Ireland. The group consists of host nation Ireland, Chinese Taipei, United States, Great Britain, Australia and Botswana. The United States and Australia advanced to the Finals to be held in 2024, with the United States going undefeated winning all four of their games.

Hannah Flippen of the United States was named the most valuable player of Group A.

== Teams ==
Draw position	Team	Confederation	Method of qualification	Date of qualification	Finals appearance	Last appearance	Previous best performance	WBSC Rankings
A1	Ireland	WBSC Europe	Hosts	9 June 2022	2nd	2016	Group stage (2016)	17
A2	Chinese Taipei	WBSC Asia	Asia Cup third place	6 April 2023	17th	2022	Runners-up (1982)	3
A3	United States	WBSC Americas	Pan American Championship winners	19 November 2022	18th	2022	Winners (1974, 1978, 1986, 1990, 1994, 1998, 2002, 2006, 2010, 2016, 2018, 2022)	1
A4	Great Britain	WBSC Europe	European Championship runners-up	29 July 2022	8th	2022	Runners-up (1982)	16
A5	Australia	WBSC Oceania	Oceania	Automatic (Oceania)	18th	2022	Winners (1965)	9
A6	Botswana	WBSC Africa	African qualifier runners-up	15 February 2023	6th	2018	Group stage (1994, 2006, 2010, 2014, 2018)	43

== Standings ==
Pos	Team	Pld	W	L	RF	RA	RD	PCT	GB	Qualification
1	Great Britain	3	3	0	11	0	+11	1.000	—	Advance to Group A Final
1	United States	3	3	0	20	0	+20	1.000	—	Advance to Group A Final
3	Australia	5	3	2	19	2	+17	.600	1	Advance to Group A third place play-off
4	Chinese Taipei	5	2	3	21	13	+8	.400	2	Advance to Group A third place play-off
5	Ireland (H)	4	1	3	8	22	−14	.250	2.5	
6	Botswana	4	0	4	0	42	−42	.000	3.5	

Source: WBSC
Rules for classification: 1) Wins/losses; 2) Head to head; 3) Head to head runs against; 4) Runs against; 5) Head to head
(H) Hosts

Note: The final three group games were rained off with the final pairings already being decided.

== Summary ==
All times listed are local, IST (UTC+1).

Date	Local time	Road team	Score	Home team	Inn.	Venue	Game duration	Attendance	Boxscore
11 July 2023	11:00	Great Britain	2–0	Australia	7	O'Dwyers GAA	2:07	80	Boxscore
11 July 2023	14:00	United States	5–0	Chinese Taipei	7	O'Dwyers GAA	1:59	160	Boxscore
11 July 2023	18:30	Botswana	0–7	Ireland	5	O'Dwyers GAA	1:41	156	Boxscore
12 July 2023	10:00	Great Britain	2–0	Chinese Taipei	7	O'Dwyers GAA	1:57	125	Boxscore
12 July 2023	13:00	Ireland	0–4	Australia	7	O'Dwyers GAA	1:35	189	Boxscore
12 July 2023	15:00	United States	15–0	Botswana	5	O'Dwyers GAA	1:49	75	Boxscore
12 July 2023	18:30	Chinese Taipei	11–1	Ireland	5	O'Dwyers GAA	1:40	88	Boxscore
13 July 2023	10:00	Australia	10–0	Botswana	4	O'Dwyers GAA	1:17	65	Boxscore
13 July 2023	13:00	Botswana	0–10	Chinese Taipei	4	O'Dwyers GAA	1:08	45	Boxscore
13 July 2023	15:00	Australia	0–1	United States	8	O'Dwyers GAA	1:54	150	Boxscore
13 July 2023	18:30	Ireland	0–7	Great Britain	5	O'Dwyers GAA	1:09	250	Boxscore
14 July 2023	10:00	Chinese Taipei	0–5	Australia	7	O'Dwyers GAA	2:01	60	Boxscore
14 July 2023	13:00	Botswana	Cancelled	Great Britain	—	O'Dwyers GAA	—	—	
14 July 2023	15:00	Great Britain	Cancelled	United States	—	O'Dwyers GAA	—	—	
14 July 2023	18:30	Ireland	Cancelled	United States	—	O'Dwyers GAA	—	—	

== Matches ==
=== Great Britain vs Australia ===
The two teams had faced each other three times in a Women's Softball World Cup, most recently in 2018, an 11–0 win for Australia.

11 July 2023 11:00 O'Dwyers GAA 15 °C (59 °F), partly cloudy
Team	1	2	3	4	5	6	7	R	H	E
Great Britain	0	0	0	1	0	1	0	2	7	0
Australia	0	0	0	0	0	0	0	0	3	0
WP: Georgina Corrick (1–0) LP: Ellen Roberts (0–1); Home runs: GBR: Kendyl Scott (1); AUS: None; Attendance: 80; Umpires: HP – Marni Bodnarchuk, 1B – Trevor Topping, 2B – Anthony Kaiaruna, 3B – Michal Židek; Boxscore

=== United States vs Chinese Taipei ===
11 July 2023 14:00 O'Dwyers GAA 18 °C (64 °F), partly cloudy
Team	1	2	3	4	5	6	7	R	H	E
United States	0	0	3	0	1	1	0	5	10	0
Chinese Taipei	0	0	0	0	0	0	0	0	1	3
WP: Ally Carda (1–0) LP: An-Ju Chiu (0–1) Sv: Megan Faraimo (1); Home runs: USA: Kiara Robinson-Milloy (1); TPE: None; Attendance: 160; Umpires: HP – Norikazu Hamasaki, 1B – Patrick Reus, 2B – Renzo Ruiz, 3B – Trevor Topping; Boxscore

=== Botswana vs Ireland ===
11 July 2023 18:30 O'Dwyers GAA 18 °C (64 °F), overcast
Team	1	2	3	4	5	6	7	R	H	E
Botswana	0	0	0	0	0	X	X	0	1	1
Ireland (5)	3	0	4	0	X	X	X	7	5	1
WP: Kailey O'Connor (1–0) LP: Wangu Gondo (0–1); Attendance: 156; Umpires: HP – Sara Dielen, 1B – Galip Sönmez, 2B – Michal Židek, 3B – Patrick Reus; Boxscore

=== Great Britain vs Chinese Taipei ===
12 July 2023 10:00 O'Dwyers GAA 14 °C (57 °F), cloudy
Team	1	2	3	4	5	6	7	R	H	E
Great Britain	0	0	2	0	0	0	0	2	3	1
Chinese Taipei	0	0	0	0	0	0	0	0	7	1
WP: Georgina Corrick (2–0) LP: An-Ju Chiu (0–2); Home runs: GBR: Georgina Corrick (1); TPE: None; Attendance: 125; Umpires: HP – Michal Židek, 1B – Renzo Ruiz, 2B – Sara Dielen, 3B – Norikazu Hamasaki; Boxscore

=== Ireland vs Australia ===
12 July 2023 13:00 O'Dwyers GAA 17 °C (63 °F), overcast
Team	1	2	3	4	5	6	7	R	H	E
Ireland	0	0	0	0	0	0	0	0	1	1
Australia	0	0	0	1	2	1	X	4	6	0
WP: Kaia Parnaby (1–0) LP: Arianna Jarvis (0–1); Home runs: IRE: None; AUS: Jade Wall (1); Attendance: 189; Umpires: HP – Trevor Topping, 1B – Galip Sönmez, 2B – Marni Bodnarchuk, 3B – Anthony Kaiaruna; Boxscore

=== United States vs Botswana ===
12 July 2023 15:00 O'Dwyers GAA 19 °C (66 °F), cloudy
Team	1	2	3	4	5	6	7	R	H	E
United States (5)	1	1	6	0	7	X	X	15	11	0
Botswana	0	0	0	0	0	X	X	0	1	4
WP: Kelly Maxwell (1–0) LP: Otsile Leave (0–1) Sv: Montana Fouts (1); Home runs: USA: Alison Aguilar (1); BOT: None; Attendance: 75; Umpires: HP – Renzo Ruiz, 1B – Sara Dielen, 2B – Patrick Reus, 3B – Norikazu Hamasaki; Boxscore

=== Chinese Taipei vs Ireland ===
12 July 2023 18:30 O'Dwyers GAA 18 °C (64 °F), partly cloudy
Team	1	2	3	4	5	6	7	R	H	E
Chinese Taipei (5)	2	5	1	0	3	X	X	11	11	0
Ireland	1	0	0	0	0	X	X	1	3	4
WP: Hsia-Ai Ke (1–0) LP: Summer Rocha (0–1); Home runs: TPE: Chia-Wen Shen (1); IRE: None; Attendance: 88; Umpires: HP – Anthony Kaiaruna, 1B – Marni Bodnarchuk, 2B – Trevor Topping, 3B – Galip Sönmez; Boxscore

=== Australia vs Botswana ===
13 July 2023 10:00 O'Dwyers GAA 15 °C (59 °F), partly cloudy
Team	1	2	3	4	5	6	7	R	H	E
Australia (4)	8	1	0	1	X	X	X	10	7	0
Botswana	0	0	0	0	X	X	X	0	1	2
WP: Kandra Lamb (1–0) LP: Lesego Ditau (0–1); Home runs: AUS: Philippa Adkins (1); BOT: None; Attendance: 65; Umpires: HP – Marni Bodnarchuk, 1B – Anthony Kaiaruna, 2B – Patrick Reus, 3B – Galip Sönmez; Boxscore

=== Botswana vs Chinese Taipei ===
13 July 2023 13:00 O'Dwyers GAA 17 °C (63 °F), partly cloudy
Team	1	2	3	4	5	6	7	R	H	E
Botswana	0	0	0	0	X	X	X	0	0	3
Chinese Taipei (4)	4	2	4	X	X	X	X	10	10	0
WP: Chia-Chen Tsai (1–0) LP: Wangu Gondo (0–2); Home runs: BOT: None; TPE: Chia-Yun Chang (1); Attendance: 45; Umpires: HP – Sara Dielen, 1B – Norikazu Hamasaki, 2B – Michal Židek, 3B – Renzo Ruiz; Boxscore

=== Australia vs United States ===
13 July 2023 15:00 O'Dwyers GAA 18 °C (64 °F), overcast
Team	1	2	3	4	5	6	7	8	R	H	E
Australia	0	0	0	0	0	0	0	0	0	1	0
United States (8)	0	0	0	0	0	0	0	1	1	3	0
WP: Megan Faraimo (1–0) LP: Georgia Hood (0–1); Attendance: 150; Umpires: HP – Trevor Topping, 1B – Michal Židek, 2B – Anthony Kaiaruna, 3B – Marni Bodnarchuk; Boxscore

=== Ireland vs Great Britain ===
13 July 2023 18:30 O'Dwyers GAA 18 °C (64 °F), cloudy
Team	1	2	3	4	5	6	7	R	H	E
Ireland	0	0	0	0	0	X	X	0	0	5
Great Britain (5)	0	0	7	0	X	X	X	7	7	0
WP: Georgina Corrick (3–0) LP: Kailey O'Connor (1–1); Attendance: 250; Umpires: HP – Galip Sönmez, 1B – Patrick Reus, 2B – Norikazu Hamasaki, 3B – Renzo Ruiz; Boxscore

=== Chinese Taipei vs Australia ===
14 July 2023 10:00 O'Dwyers GAA 14 °C (57 °F), drizzling
Team	1	2	3	4	5	6	7	R	H	E
Chinese Taipei	0	0	0	0	0	0	0	0	6	0
Australia	2	0	3	0	0	0	X	5	9	0
WP: Kandra Lamb (2–0) LP: Ching-Yu Chen (0–1) Sv: Kaia Parnaby (1); Attendance: 60; Umpires: HP – Patrick Reus, 1B – Renzo Ruiz, 2B – Marni Bodnarchuk, 3B – Sara Dielen; Boxscore

=== Botswana vs Great Britain ===
Game was cancelled due to weather conditions.

14 July 2023 13:00 O'Dwyers GAA
Team	1	2	3	4	5	6	7	R	H	E
Botswana	–	–	–	–	–	–	–	–	–	–
Great Britain	–	–	–	–	–	–	–	–	–	–

=== Great Britain vs United States ===
Game was cancelled due to weather conditions.

14 July 2023 15:00 O'Dwyers GAA
Team	1	2	3	4	5	6	7	R	H	E
Great Britain	–	–	–	–	–	–	–	–	–	–
United States	–	–	–	–	–	–	–	–	–	–

=== Ireland vs United States ===
Game was cancelled due to weather conditions.

14 July 2023 18:30 O'Dwyers GAA
Team	1	2	3	4	5	6	7	R	H	E
Ireland	–	–	–	–	–	–	–	–	–	–
United States	–	–	–	–	–	–	–	–	–	–

== Play-offs ==
The winner of the final and the repechage qualify for the 2024 finals.

=== Bracket ===
Final
15 July – Balbriggan
Great Britain	0
United States	7
Third place play-off
15 July – Balbriggan
Chinese Taipei	3
Australia	4

Repechage
15 July – Balbriggan
Australia	4
Great Britain	1

=== Summary ===
Round	Date	Local time	Road team	Score	Home team	Inn.	Venue	Game duration	Attendance	Boxscore
5th place match	15 July 2023	15:30	Botswana	Cancelled	Ireland	—	O'Dwyers GAA	—	—	—
3rd place match	15 July 2023	17:15	Chinese Taipei	3–4	Australia	7	O'Dwyers GAA	1:53	139	Boxscore
Final	15 July 2023	8:00	Great Britain	0–7	United States	5	O'Dwyers GAA	1:32	55	Boxscore
Repechage	15 July 2023	19:35	Australia	4–1	Great Britain	7	O'Dwyers GAA	2:17	56	Boxscore

=== Fifth place play-off ===
Game was cancelled due to weather conditions.

15 July 2023 09:30 O'Dwyers GAA
Team	1	2	3	4	5	6	7	R	H	E
Botswana	–	–	–	–	–	–	–	–	–	–
Ireland	–	–	–	–	–	–	–	–	–	–

=== Third place play-off ===
15 July 2023 17:15 O'Dwyers GAA 17 °C (63 °F), cloudy
Team	1	2	3	4	5	6	7	R	H	E
Chinese Taipei	0	1	0	0	0	0	2	3	7	2
Australia	0	0	2	0	1	1	X	4	9	1
WP: Kaia Parnaby (2–0) LP: Hsia-Ai Ke (1–1) Sv: Ellen Roberts (1); Home runs: TPE: Szu-Shih Li (1); AUS: None; Attendance: 139; Umpires: HP – Anthony Kaiaruna, 1B – Patrick Reus, 2B – Galip Sönmez, 3B – Sara Dielen; Boxscore

=== Final ===
15 July 2023 8:00 O'Dwyers GAA 13 °C (55 °F), cloudy
Team	1	2	3	4	5	6	7	R	H	E
Great Britain	0	0	0	0	0	X	X	0	2	1
United States (5)	2	0	0	0	5	X	X	7	7	1
WP: Ally Carda (2–0) LP: Ann Faulkner (0–1); Home runs: GBR: None; USA: Alison Aguilar (2); Attendance: 55; Umpires: HP – Marni Bodnarchuk, 1B – Renzo Ruiz, 2B – Norikazu Hamasaki, 3B – Patrick Reus; Boxscore

=== Repechage ===
15 July 2023 19:35 O'Dwyers GAA 16 °C (61 °F), overcast
Team	1	2	3	4	5	6	7	R	H	E
Australia	0	0	0	0	4	0	0	4	5	1
Great Britain	1	0	0	0	0	0	0	1	4	1
WP: Ellen Roberts (1–1) LP: Georgina Corrick (3–1); Attendance: 56; Umpires: HP – Trevor Topping, 1B – Galip Sönmez, 2B – Michal Židek, 3B – Anthony Kaiaruna; Boxscore

== Final standings ==
Rk	Team	W	L
1	United States (Q)	4	0
2	Australia (Q)	5	2
3	Great Britain	3	2
4	Chinese Taipei	2	4
5	Ireland	1	3
6	Botswana	0	4
