= 2024 Women's Softball World Cup Group B =

Group B of the 2024 Women's Softball World Cup will take place from 18 to 22 July 2023 in Valencia, Spain. The group consists of host nation Spain, China, Cuba, Puerto Rico, Netherlands and South Africa.

== Teams ==
| Draw position | Team | Confederation | Method of qualification | Date of qualification | Finals appearance | Last appearance | Previous best performance | WBSC Rankings |
|---|---|---|---|---|---|---|---|---|
| B1 | Spain | WBSC Europe | Hosts | 9 June 2022 | 2nd | 1994 | Group stage (1994) | 12 |
| B2 | China | WBSC Asia | Asia Cup runners-up | 6 April 2023 | 12th | 2022 | Runners-up (1986, 1994) | 11 |
| B3 | Cuba | WBSC Americas | Pan American Championship third place | 19 November 2022 | 6th | 2016 | Championship round (2016) | 28 |
| B4 | Puerto Rico | WBSC Americas | Pan American Championship fourth place | 19 November 2022 | 12th | 2022 | Playoff round (2018) | 4 |
| B5 | Netherlands | WBSC Europe | European Championship winners | 29 July 2022 | 15th | 2018 | Fourth place (2016) | 10 |
| B6 | South Africa | WBSC Africa | African qualifier winner | 15 February 2023 | 8th | 2018 | Group stage (1974, 1998, 2002, 2006, 2010, 2012) | 38 |

== Standings ==
| Pos | Team | Pld | W | L | RF | RA | RD | PCT | GB | Qualification |
|---|---|---|---|---|---|---|---|---|---|---|
| 1 | China | 5 | 4 | 1 | 15 | 4 | +11 | .800 (Note: Tied on head to head results. Head-to-head runs against: China 2, Puerto Rico 3, Cuba 4.) | — | Advance to Group B Final |
| 2 | Puerto Rico | 5 | 4 | 1 | 11 | 4 | +7 | .800 | — | Advance to Group B Final |
| 3 | Cuba | 5 | 4 | 1 | 17 | 10 | +7 | .800 | — | Advance to Group B third place play-off |
| 4 | Netherlands | 5 | 2 | 3 | 21 | 12 | +9 | .400 | 2 | Advance to Group B third place play-off |
| 5 | Spain (H) | 5 | 1 | 4 | 17 | 13 | +4 | .200 | 3 | |
| 6 | South Africa | 5 | 0 | 5 | 5 | 43 | −38 | .000 | 4 | |

Source: WBSC
Rules for classification: 1) Wins/losses; 2) Head to head; 3) Head to head runs against; 4) Runs against; 5) Head to head
(H) Hosts

== Summary ==
All times listed are local, CEST (UTC+2).

| Date | Local time | Road team | Score | Home team | Inn. | Venue | Game duration | Attendance | Boxscore |
|---|---|---|---|---|---|---|---|---|---|
| 18 July 2023 | 11:00 | Netherlands | 3–4 | Cuba | 7 | Camp Municipal de València | 120 | 2:00 | Boxscore |
| 18 July 2023 | 14:00 | China | 2–0 | Puerto Rico | 7 | Camp Municipal de València | 130 | 1:47 | Boxscore |
| 18 July 2023 | 18:00 | South Africa | 0–14 | Spain | 4 | Camp Municipal de València | 250 | 1:17 | Boxscore |
| 19 July 2023 | 10:00 | Netherlands | 4–5 | China | 7 | Camp Municipal de València | 170 | 2:32 | Boxscore |
| 19 July 2023 | 12:30 | Cuba | 10–3 | South Africa | 7 | Camp Municipal de València | 77 | 1:51 | Boxscore |
| 19 July 2023 | 15:00 | South Africa | 1–8 | Puerto Rico | 5 | Camp Municipal de València | 40 | 1:08 | Boxscore |
| 19 July 2023 | 18:00 | Spain | 1–2 | Cuba | 7 | Camp Municipal de València | 545 | 1:28 | Boxscore |
| 20 July 2023 | 10:00 | Spain | 2–3 | Netherlands | 7 | Camp Municipal de València | 350 | 2:05 | Boxscore |
| 20 July 2023 | 12:30 | Cuba | 1–3 | Puerto Rico | 7 | Camp Municipal de València | 245 | 2:01 | Boxscore |
| 20 July 2023 | 15:00 | South Africa | 1–11 | Netherlands | 4 | Camp Municipal de València | 110 | 1:16 | Boxscore |
| 20 July 2023 | 18:00 | Spain | 0–8 | China | 5 | Camp Municipal de València | 200 | 1:12 | Boxscore |
| 21 July 2023 | 10:00 | Puerto Rico | 6–1 | Netherlands | 7 | Camp Municipal de València | 200 | 2:27 | Boxscore |
| 21 July 2023 | 12:30 | China | 10–0 | South Africa | 5 | Camp Municipal de València | 119 | 1:28 | Boxscore |
| 21 July 2023 | 15:00 | Cuba | 2–1 | China | 7 | Camp Municipal de València | 145 | 1:38 | Boxscore |
| 21 July 2023 | 18:00 | Puerto Rico | 12–2 | Spain | 7 | Camp Municipal de València | 412 | 1:51 | Boxscore |

== Matches ==
=== Netherlands vs Cuba ===
18 July 2023 11:00 Camp Municipal de Beisbol i Sofbol de València
| Team | 1 | 2 | 3 | 4 | 5 | 6 | 7 | R | H | E |
|---|---|---|---|---|---|---|---|---|---|---|
| Netherlands | 2 | 0 | 0 | 0 | 0 | 0 | 1 | 3 | 7 | 1 |
| Cuba | 0 | 2 | 1 | 1 | 0 | 0 | 0 | 4 | 8 | 0 |
WP: Yilian Tornes LP: Jessie Van Aalst; Boxscore

=== China vs Puerto Rico ===
18 July 2023 14:00 Camp Municipal de Beisbol i Sofbol de València
| Team | 1 | 2 | 3 | 4 | 5 | 6 | 7 | R | H | E |
|---|---|---|---|---|---|---|---|---|---|---|
| China | 0 | 0 | 0 | 2 | 0 | 0 | 0 | 2 | 8 | 0 |
| Puerto Rico | 0 | 0 | 0 | 0 | 0 | 0 | 0 | 0 | 4 | 0 |
WP: Yuchen Wei LP: Lan Wang Sv: Taran Alvelo; Boxscore

=== South Africa vs Spain ===
18 July 2023 18:00 Camp Municipal de Beisbol i Sofbol de València
| Team | 1 | 2 | 3 | 4 | 5 | 6 | 7 | R | H | E |
|---|---|---|---|---|---|---|---|---|---|---|
| South Africa | 0 | 0 | 0 | 0 | X | X | X | 0 | 1 | 3 |
| Spain (4) | 13 | 1 | 0 | 0 | X | X | X | 14 | 9 | 0 |
WP: Ariadna Cerda LP: Hannah Ruth Hugo; Boxscore

=== Netherlands vs China ===
19 July 2023 10:00 Camp Municipal de Beisbol i Sofbol de València
| Team | 1 | 2 | 3 | 4 | 5 | 6 | 7 | R | H | E |
|---|---|---|---|---|---|---|---|---|---|---|
| Netherlands | 0 | 0 | 3 | 0 | 0 | 1 | 0 | 4 | 8 | 1 |
| China | 0 | 0 | 2 | 2 | 0 | 1 | X | 5 | 6 | 0 |
WP: Lan Wang LP: Marjolein Merkx; Boxscore

=== Cuba vs South Africa ===
19 July 2023 12:30 Camp Municipal de Beisbol i Sofbol de València
| Team | 1 | 2 | 3 | 4 | 5 | 6 | 7 | R | H | E |
|---|---|---|---|---|---|---|---|---|---|---|
| Cuba (6) | 0 | 3 | 4 | 0 | 0 | 3 | X | 10 | 14 | 1 |
| South Africa | 0 | 0 | 0 | 0 | 3 | 0 | X | 3 | 6 | 3 |
WP: Yamerki Guevara Limonta LP: Nushka De Beer; Boxscore

=== South Africa vs Puerto Rico ===
19 July 2023 15:00 Camp Municipal de Beisbol i Sofbol de València
| Team | 1 | 2 | 3 | 4 | 5 | 6 | 7 | R | H | E |
|---|---|---|---|---|---|---|---|---|---|---|
| South Africa | 0 | 0 | 0 | 0 | 1 | X | X | 1 | 4 | 0 |
| Puerto Rico (5) | 1 | 2 | 0 | 5 | X | X | X | 8 | 10 | 0 |
WP: Macey Cintron LP: Mosima Pretty Gwangwa; Boxscore

=== Spain vs Cuba ===
19 July 2023 18:00 Camp Municipal de Beisbol i Sofbol de València
| Team | 1 | 2 | 3 | 4 | 5 | 6 | 7 | R | H | E |
|---|---|---|---|---|---|---|---|---|---|---|
| Spain | 0 | 0 | 0 | 1 | 0 | 0 | 0 | 1 | 3 | 0 |
| Cuba | 0 | 0 | 1 | 1 | 0 | 0 | X | 2 | 6 | 0 |
WP: Yilian Tornes LP: Anyibell Ramírez; Boxscore

=== Spain vs Netherlands ===
20 July 2023 10:00 Camp Municipal de Beisbol i Sofbol de València
| Team | 1 | 2 | 3 | 4 | 5 | 6 | 7 | R | H | E |
|---|---|---|---|---|---|---|---|---|---|---|
| Spain | 0 | 0 | 0 | 0 | 0 | 0 | 2 | 2 | 4 | 0 |
| Netherlands | 1 | 0 | 0 | 0 | 0 | 2 | X | 3 | 5 | 1 |
WP: Marjolein Merkx LP: Beatriz Alonso Sv: Lisa Hop; Boxscore

=== Cuba vs Puerto Rico ===
20 July 2023 12:30 Camp Municipal de Beisbol i Sofbol de València
| Team | 1 | 2 | 3 | 4 | 5 | 6 | 7 | R | H | E |
|---|---|---|---|---|---|---|---|---|---|---|
| Cuba | 0 | 0 | 0 | 0 | 1 | 0 | 0 | 1 | 5 | 1 |
| Puerto Rico | 0 | 3 | 0 | 0 | 0 | 0 | X | 3 | 4 | 0 |
WP: Aleshia Ocasio LP: Yilian Tornes; Boxscore

=== South Africa vs Netherlands ===
20 July 2023 15:00 Camp Municipal de Beisbol i Sofbol de València
| Team | 1 | 2 | 3 | 4 | 5 | 6 | 7 | R | H | E |
|---|---|---|---|---|---|---|---|---|---|---|
| South Africa | 0 | 1 | 0 | 0 | X | X | X | 1 | 3 | 0 |
| Netherlands (4) | 7 | 2 | 2 | X | X | X | X | 11 | 14 | 3 |
WP: Lizzie Clarijs LP: Nushka De Beer; Boxscore

=== Spain vs China ===
20 July 2023 18:00 Camp Municipal de Beisbol i Sofbol de València
| Team | 1 | 2 | 3 | 4 | 5 | 6 | 7 | R | H | E |
|---|---|---|---|---|---|---|---|---|---|---|
| Spain | 0 | 0 | 0 | 0 | 0 | X | X | 0 | 2 | 0 |
| China (5) | 4 | 1 | 0 | 3 | X | X | X | 8 | 8 | 0 |
WP: Yinan Chai LP: Carmen Caicoya Sv: Yuchen Wei; Boxscore

=== Puerto Rico vs Netherlands ===
21 July 2023 10:00 Camp Municipal de Beisbol i Sofbol de València
| Team | 1 | 2 | 3 | 4 | 5 | 6 | 7 | R | H | E |
|---|---|---|---|---|---|---|---|---|---|---|
| Puerto Rico | 0 | 0 | 2 | 3 | 1 | 0 | 0 | 6 | 10 | 2 |
| Netherlands | 1 | 0 | 0 | 0 | 0 | 0 | 0 | 1 | 4 | 3 |
Home runs: PUR: Taran Alvelo; NED: Lindsey Meadows; Boxscore

=== China vs South Africa ===
21 July 2023 12:30 Camp Municipal de Beisbol i Sofbol de València
| Team | 1 | 2 | 3 | 4 | 5 | 6 | 7 | R | H | E |
|---|---|---|---|---|---|---|---|---|---|---|
| China (5) | 4 | 0 | 1 | 1 | 4 | X | X | 10 | 13 | 0 |
| South Africa | 0 | 0 | 0 | 0 | 0 | X | X | 0 | 3 | 4 |
WP: Yuchen Wei LP: Yue Sun Sv: Johandri Van Der Walt; Boxscore

=== Cuba vs China ===
21 July 2023 15:00 Camp Municipal de Beisbol i Sofbol de València
| Team | 1 | 2 | 3 | 4 | 5 | 6 | 7 | R | H | E |
|---|---|---|---|---|---|---|---|---|---|---|
| Cuba | 0 | 0 | 2 | 0 | 0 | 0 | 0 | 2 | 5 | 0 |
| China | 0 | 0 | 1 | 0 | 0 | 0 | 0 | 1 | 4 | 1 |
WP: Yilian Tornes LP: Yinan Chai; Boxscore

=== Puerto Rico vs Spain ===
21 July 2023 18:00 Camp Municipal de Beisbol i Sofbol de València
| Team | 1 | 2 | 3 | 4 | 5 | 6 | 7 | R | H | E |
|---|---|---|---|---|---|---|---|---|---|---|
| Puerto Rico | 0 | 0 | 0 | 1 | 0 | 7 | 4 | 12 | 14 | 0 |
| Spain | 0 | 1 | 1 | 0 | 0 | 0 | 0 | 2 | 5 | 2 |
WP: Keira Bucker LP: Anyibell Ramírez; Boxscore

== Play-offs ==
The winner of the final and the repechage qualify for the 2024 finals.

=== Bracket ===
Final
22 July – Valencia
Puerto Rico | 2
China | 1
Third place play-off
22 July – Valencia
Netherlands | 2
Cuba | 1

Repechage
22 July – Valencia
Netherlands | 2
China | 0

=== Summary ===
| Round | Date | Local time | Road team | Score | Home team | Inn. | Venue | Game duration | Attendance | Boxscore |
|---|---|---|---|---|---|---|---|---|---|---|
| 5th place match | 22 July 2023 | 10:00 | South Africa | 0–5 | Spain | 7 | Camp Municipal de València | 1:32 | 350 | Boxscore |
| 3rd place match | 22 July 2023 | 12:30 | Netherlands | 2–1 | Cuba | 7 | Camp Municipal de València | 2:12 | 205 | Boxscore |
| Final | 22 July 2023 | 15:00 | Puerto Rico | 2–1 | China | 7 | Camp Municipal de València | 1:41 | 201 | Boxscore |
| Repechage | 22 July 2023 | 18:00 | Netherlands | 2–0 | China | 7 | Camp Municipal de València | 2:06 | 350 | Boxscore |

=== Fifth place play-off ===
22 July 2023 10:00 Camp Municipal de Beisbol i Sofbol de València
| Team | 1 | 2 | 3 | 4 | 5 | 6 | 7 | R | H | E |
|---|---|---|---|---|---|---|---|---|---|---|
| South Africa | 0 | 0 | 0 | 0 | 0 | 0 | 0 | 0 | 2 | 2 |
| Spain | 1 | 4 | 0 | 0 | 0 | 0 | 0 | 5 | 7 | 2 |
WP: Beatriz Alonso LP: Nushka De Beer; Boxscore

=== Third place play-off ===
22 July 2023 12:30 Camp Municipal de Beisbol i Sofbol de València
| Team | 1 | 2 | 3 | 4 | 5 | 6 | 7 | R | H | E |
|---|---|---|---|---|---|---|---|---|---|---|
| Netherlands | 0 | 0 | 2 | 0 | 0 | 0 | 0 | 2 | 3 | 0 |
| Cuba | 0 | 0 | 0 | 0 | 0 | 1 | 0 | 1 | 2 | 0 |
WP: Eva Voortman LP: Yilian Tornes; Boxscore

=== Final ===
22 July 2023 15:00 Camp Municipal de Beisbol i Sofbol de València
| Team | 1 | 2 | 3 | 4 | 5 | 6 | 7 | R | H | E |
|---|---|---|---|---|---|---|---|---|---|---|
| Puerto Rico | 0 | 1 | 0 | 0 | 1 | 0 | 0 | 2 | 7 | 1 |
| China | 1 | 0 | 0 | 0 | 0 | 0 | 0 | 1 | 5 | 1 |
WP: Aleshia Ocasio LP: Yuchen Wei; Boxscore

=== Repechage ===
22 July 2023 18:00 Camp Municipal de Beisbol i Sofbol de València
| Team | 1 | 2 | 3 | 4 | 5 | 6 | 7 | R | H | E |
|---|---|---|---|---|---|---|---|---|---|---|
| Netherlands | 2 | 0 | 0 | 0 | 0 | 0 | 0 | 2 | 9 | 0 |
| China | 0 | 0 | 0 | 0 | 0 | 0 | 0 | 0 | 4 | 0 |
WP: Jessie Van Aalst LP: Yinan Chai Sv: Lisa Hop; Boxscore
