= 2024 Women's Softball World Cup =

Women's international softball tournament

Tournament details
- Host countries: Ireland; Italy; Spain
- Dates: 11–26 July 2023 (groups); 15–20 July 2024 (finals)
- Teams: 18 (from 5 continents)
- Venues: 4 (in 3 host cities)
- Defending champions: United States (2022)

Final positions
- Champions: Japan
- Runner-up: United States
- Third place: Canada

Tournament statistics
- Games played: 15
- Attendance: 1,693 (113 per game)
- Last updated on 26 July 2023

The 2024 Women's Softball World Cup was the 17th Women's Softball World Cup, an international softball tournament taking place in Balbriggan, Ireland; Buttrio and Castions di Strada, Italy and Valencia, Spain. The group stage took place from 11–26 July 2023, held as three separate groups across three nations. The finals took place in Buttrio and Castions di Strada, Italy from 15–20 July 2024. This was the first WBSC event to be held in two stages. It was the first time Ireland, Italy and Spain had hosted a major softball tournament. It also was the first time more than one nation hosted the tournament.

== Qualified teams ==
Team	World ranking (Note: As of 12 April 2023.)	Method of qualification
Italy	8th	2022 Women's Softball European Championship third place/Hosts
Ireland	17th	Hosts
Spain	12th	Hosts
South Africa	38th	African Qualifier
Botswana	43rd	African Qualifier
United States	1st	2022 Pan American Championship winners
Canada	5th	2022 Pan American Championship runners-up
Cuba	28th	2022 Pan American Championship third place
Puerto Rico	4th	2022 Pan American Championship fourth place
Venezuela	22nd	2022 Pan American Championship fifth place
Japan	2nd	2023 Women's Softball Asia Cup winners
China	11th	2023 Women's Softball Asia Cup runners-up
Chinese Taipei	3rd	2023 Women's Softball Asia Cup third place
Philippines	26th	2023 Women's Softball Asia Cup fourth place
Netherlands	10th	2022 Women's Softball European Championship winners
Great Britain	16th	2022 Women's Softball European Championship runners-up
Australia	9th	Oceania Spot
New Zealand	29th	Oceania Spot

Notes

1. Three wild cards are given for this tournament; two for Ireland and Spain as group stage hosts, and the third wild card allocated to the Asian confederation. The Asian berth were given to the continental championship fourth placers.

== Officials ==
30 umpires were selected by the WBSC for the tournament.

Umpires
Confederation	Umpires
WBSC Africa	Abel Mataboge (Botswana)
WBSC Americas	Gabriela Elizabeth Jiménez (Argentina)
WBSC Americas	Marni Bodnarchuk (Canada)
WBSC Americas	Trevor Topping (Canada)
WBSC Americas	Juan Felipe Arteaga (Colombia)
WBSC Americas	Maykel García (Cuba)
WBSC Americas	Renzo Ruiz (Mexico)
WBSC Americas	José Chaparro (Puerto Rico)
WBSC Americas	Naomi Jenise Erdahl (United States)
WBSC Americas	Steve McCown (United States)
WBSC Americas	Manuel Tovar (Venezuela)
WBSC Asia	Zhiling Yu (China)
WBSC Asia	Yu Sung Lin (Chinese Taipei)
WBSC Asia	Ayaka Sasajima (Japan)
WBSC Asia	Norikazu Hamasaki (Japan)
WBSC Europe	Sara Dielen (Belgium)
WBSC Europe	Alen Magdalenic (Croatia)
WBSC Europe	Jan Hora (Czech Republic)
WBSC Europe	Michal Zidek (Czech Republic)
WBSC Europe	Galip Sönmez (Germany)
WBSC Europe	Thomas Hans-Georg Lohnert (Germany)
WBSC Europe	Jana Lee McCaskill (Great Britain)
WBSC Europe	Sabrina Fabrizi (Italy)
WBSC Europe	Mariana Atanasova-Prins (Netherlands)
WBSC Europe	Patrick Reus (Netherlands)
WBSC Oceania	Jason Lewins Carter Australia
WBSC Oceania	Anthony Kaiaruna New Zealand

Umpire Directors
Confederation	Umpire Director
WBSC Europe	Gian Paolo Pelosi (Italy)
WBSC Europe	Luis Ignacio Pardo Lozano (Spain)
WBSC Americas	Chris Drumm (United States)

== Venues ==
Group A	Group B	Group C & Finals	
(Republic of Ireland) Balbriggan, Ireland	Valencia, Spain	Buttrio, Italy	Castions di Strada, Italy
O'Dwyers GAA	Camp Municipal de València	Campo Cav. Gino Michelutti	Campo Comunale da Softball
2024 Women's Softball World Cup is located in Ireland	2024 Women's Softball World Cup is located in Spain	2024 Women's Softball World Cup is located in Italy	

== Group stage ==
=== Group A ===
Group A will be contested in Balbriggan during 11–15 July 2023.

Pos	Team	Pld	W	L	RF	RA	RD	PCT	GB	Qualification
1	Great Britain	3	3	0	11	0	+11	1.000	—	Advance to Group A Final
1	United States	3	3	0	20	0	+20	1.000	—	Advance to Group A Final
3	Australia	5	3	2	19	2	+17	.600	1	Advance to Group A third place play-off
4	Chinese Taipei	5	2	3	21	13	+8	.400	2	Advance to Group A third place play-off
5	Ireland (H)	4	1	3	8	22	−14	.250	2.5	
6	Botswana	4	0	4	0	42	−42	.000	3.5	

Source: WBSC
Rules for classification: 1) Wins/losses; 2) Head to head; 3) Head to head runs against; 4) Runs against; 5) Head to head
(H) Hosts

Note: The final three group games were rained off with the final pairings already being decided. All times listed are local, IST (UTC+1).

Date	Local time	Road team	Score	Home team	Inn.	Venue	Game duration	Attendance	Boxscore
11 July 2023	11:00	Great Britain	2–0	Australia	7	O'Dwyers GAA	2:07	80	Boxscore
11 July 2023	14:00	United States	5–0	Chinese Taipei	7	O'Dwyers GAA	1:59	160	Boxscore
11 July 2023	18:30	Botswana	0–7	Ireland	5	O'Dwyers GAA	1:41	156	Boxscore
12 July 2023	10:00	Great Britain	2–0	Chinese Taipei	7	O'Dwyers GAA	1:57	125	Boxscore
12 July 2023	13:00	Ireland	0–4	Australia	7	O'Dwyers GAA	1:35	189	Boxscore
12 July 2023	15:00	United States	15–0	Botswana	5	O'Dwyers GAA	1:49	75	Boxscore
12 July 2023	18:30	Chinese Taipei	11–1	Ireland	5	O'Dwyers GAA	1:40	88	Boxscore
13 July 2023	10:00	Australia	10–0	Botswana	4	O'Dwyers GAA	1:17	65	Boxscore
13 July 2023	13:00	Botswana	0–10	Chinese Taipei	4	O'Dwyers GAA	1:08	45	Boxscore
13 July 2023	15:00	Australia	0–1	United States	8	O'Dwyers GAA	1:54	150	Boxscore
13 July 2023	18:30	Ireland	0–7	Great Britain	5	O'Dwyers GAA	1:09	250	Boxscore
14 July 2023	10:00	Chinese Taipei	0–5	Australia	7	O'Dwyers GAA	2:01	60	Boxscore
14 July 2023	13:00	Botswana	Cancelled	Great Britain	—	O'Dwyers GAA	—	—	
14 July 2023	15:00	Great Britain	Cancelled	United States	—	O'Dwyers GAA	—	—	
14 July 2023	18:30	Ireland	Cancelled	United States	—	O'Dwyers GAA	—	—	

Final
15 July – Balbriggan
Great Britain	0
United States	7
Third place play-off
15 July – Balbriggan
Chinese Taipei	3
Australia	4

Repechage
15 July – Balbriggan
Australia	4
Great Britain	1

Round	Date	Local time	Road team	Score	Home team	Inn.	Venue	Game duration	Attendance	Boxscore
5th place match	15 July 2023	15:30	Botswana	Cancelled	Ireland	—	O'Dwyers GAA	—	—	—
3rd place match	15 July 2023	17:15	Chinese Taipei	3–4	Australia	7	O'Dwyers GAA	1:53	139	Boxscore
Final	15 July 2023	8:00	Great Britain	0–7	United States	5	O'Dwyers GAA	1:32	55	Boxscore
Repechage	15 July 2023	19:35	Australia	4–1	Great Britain	7	O'Dwyers GAA	2:17	56	Boxscore

=== Group B ===
Group B will be contested in Valencia during 18–22 July 2023.

Pos	Team	Pld	W	L	RF	RA	RD	PCT	GB	Qualification
1	China	5	4	1	15	4	+11	.800 (Note: Tied on head to head results. Head-to-head runs against: China 2, Puerto Rico 3, Cuba 4.)	—	Advance to Group B Final
2	Puerto Rico	5	4	1	11	4	+7	.800	—	Advance to Group B Final
3	Cuba	5	4	1	17	10	+7	.800	—	Advance to Group B third place play-off
4	Netherlands	5	2	3	21	12	+9	.400	2	Advance to Group B third place play-off
5	Spain (H)	5	1	4	17	13	+4	.200	3	
6	South Africa	5	0	5	5	43	−38	.000	4	

Source: WBSC
Rules for classification: 1) Wins/losses; 2) Head to head; 3) Head to head runs against; 4) Runs against; 5) Head to head
(H) Hosts
Notes:

All times listed are local, CEST (UTC+2).

Date	Local time	Road team	Score	Home team	Inn.	Venue	Game duration	Attendance	Boxscore
18 July 2023	11:00	Netherlands	3–4	Cuba	7	Camp Municipal de València	120	2:00	Boxscore
18 July 2023	14:00	China	2–0	Puerto Rico	7	Camp Municipal de València	130	1:47	Boxscore
18 July 2023	18:00	South Africa	0–14	Spain	4	Camp Municipal de València	250	1:17	Boxscore
19 July 2023	10:00	Netherlands	4–5	China	7	Camp Municipal de València	170	2:32	Boxscore
19 July 2023	12:30	Cuba	10–3	South Africa	7	Camp Municipal de València	77	1:51	Boxscore
19 July 2023	15:00	South Africa	1–8	Puerto Rico	5	Camp Municipal de València	40	1:08	Boxscore
19 July 2023	18:00	Spain	1–2	Cuba	7	Camp Municipal de València	545	1:28	Boxscore
20 July 2023	10:00	Spain	2–3	Netherlands	7	Camp Municipal de València	350	2:05	Boxscore
20 July 2023	12:30	Cuba	1–3	Puerto Rico	7	Camp Municipal de València	245	2:01	Boxscore
20 July 2023	15:00	South Africa	1–11	Netherlands	4	Camp Municipal de València	110	1:16	Boxscore
20 July 2023	18:00	Spain	0–8	China	5	Camp Municipal de València	200	1:12	Boxscore
21 July 2023	10:00	Puerto Rico	6–1	Netherlands	7	Camp Municipal de València	200	2:27	Boxscore
21 July 2023	12:30	China	10–0	South Africa	5	Camp Municipal de València	119	1:28	Boxscore
21 July 2023	15:00	Cuba	2–1	China	7	Camp Municipal de València	145	1:38	Boxscore
21 July 2023	18:00	Puerto Rico	12–2	Spain	7	Camp Municipal de València	412	1:51	Boxscore

Final
22 July – Valencia
Puerto Rico	2
China	1
Third place play-off
22 July – Valencia
Netherlands	2
Cuba	1

Repechage
22 July – Valencia
Netherlands	2
China	0

Round	Date	Local time	Road team	Score	Home team	Inn.	Venue	Game duration	Attendance	Boxscore
5th place match	22 July 2023	10:00	South Africa	0–5	Spain	7	Camp Municipal de València	1:32	350	Boxscore
3rd place match	22 July 2023	12:30	Netherlands	2–1	Cuba	7	Camp Municipal de València	2:12	205	Boxscore
Final	22 July 2023	15:00	Puerto Rico	2–1	China	7	Camp Municipal de València	1:41	201	Boxscore
Repechage	22 July 2023	18:00	Netherlands	2–0	China	7	Camp Municipal de València	2:06	350	Boxscore

=== Group C ===
Group C will be contested in Castions di Strada and Buttrio during 22–26 July 2023.

Pos	Team	Pld	W	L	RF	RA	RD	PCT	GB	Qualification
1	Canada	5	4	1	22	13	+9	.800 (Note: Head to head result: Canada 6–5 Japan)	—	Advance to Group C Final
2	Japan	5	4	1	44	8	+36	.800	—	Advance to Group C Final
3	Italy (Note: Italy automatically qualify for the finals as hosts of that stage.) (H)	5	3	2	24	11	+13	.600	1	Advance to Group C third place play-off
4	Philippines	5	2	3	12	32	−20	.400	2	Advance to Group C third place play-off
5	New Zealand	5	1	4	9	37	−28	.200 (Note: Head to head result: New Zealand 4–3 Venezuela)	3	
6	Venezuela	5	1	4	12	22	−10	.200	3	

Source: WBSC
Rules for classification: 1) Wins/losses; 2) Head to head; 3) Head to head runs against; 4) Runs against; 5) Head to head
(H) Hosts
Notes:

All times listed are local, CEST (UTC+2).

Date	Local time	Road team	Score	Home team	Inn.	Venue	Game duration	Attendance	Boxscore
22 July 2023	14:00	New Zealand	2–16	Japan	4	Campo Comunale da Softball	700	1:32	Boxscore
22 July 2023	17:00	Philippines	0–5	Canada	7	Campo Comunale da Softball	700	1:44	Boxscore
22 July 2023	20:00	Venezuela	2–4	Italy	7	Campo Comunale da Softball	1,500	2:00	Boxscore
23 July 2023	11:00	Italy	9–0	New Zealand	7	Campo Cav. Gino Michelutti	300	2:20	Boxscore
23 July 2023	14:00	Venezuela	2–6	Canada	7	Campo Cav. Gino Michelutti	180	1:53	Boxscore
23 July 2023	17:00	Japan	13–0	Philippines	4	Campo Cav. Gino Michelutti	250	1:30	Boxscore
23 July 2023	20:00	Canada	1–6	Italy	7	Campo Cav. Gino Michelutti	600	1:42	Boxscore
24 July 2023	11:00	Philippines	1–5	Venezuela	7	Campo Cav. Gino Michelutti	100	1:44	Boxscore
24 July 2023	14:00	Canada	6–5	Japan	7	Campo Cav. Gino Michelutti	150	2:12	Boxscore
24 July 2023	17:00	New Zealand	4–3	Venezuela	7	Campo Cav. Gino Michelutti	200	2:08	Boxscore
24 July 2023	20:00	Italy	Suspended	Philippines		Campo Cav. Gino Michelutti			
25 July 2023	15:00	New Zealand	0–4	Canada	7	Campo de Baseball-Softball	80	1:41	Boxscore
25 July 2023	15:00	Venezuela	0–7	Japan	7	Campo Comunale da Softball	100	1:24	Boxscore
25 July 2023	17:00	Philippines	5–3	New Zealand	7	Campo da Baseball-Softball	75	2:07	Boxscore
25 July 2023	17:00	Japan	3–0	Italy	7	Campo Comunale da Softball	300	1:48	Boxscore
25 July 2023	20:30	Italy	5–6	Philippines	7	Campo Comunale da Softball	450	2:09	Boxscore

Final
26 July – Castions di Strada
Japan	7
Canada	1
Third place play-off
26 July – Castions di Strada
Philippines	5
Italy	6

Repechage
26 July – Castions di Strada
Italy
Canada

Round	Date	Local time	Road team	Score	Home team	Inn.	Venue	Game duration	Attendance	Boxscore
5th place match	26 July 2023	11:00	Venezuela	4–0	New Zealand	7	Campo Comunale da Softball	2:06	130	Boxscore
3rd place match	26 July 2023	14:00	Philippines	5–6	Italy	7	Campo Comunale da Softball	2:05	400	Boxscore
Final	26 July 2023	17:00	Japan	7–1	Canada	7	Campo Comunale da Softball	2:14	500	Boxscore
Repechage	26 July 2023	20:00	Italy	Canceled	Canada		Campo Comunale da Softball			

=== Finals rankings ===
The ranking of the wildcard spots for the finals stage are as follows.

- 1) Hosts
- 2)Top third-place team(s) in the Group Stage, based on final standings from the previous edition of the World Cup
- 3)Top third-place team(s) in the Group Stage based on the highest position in the WBSC Rankings at the end of the previous calendar year.

Rank	Team	Previous WC	Ranking	Qualification
1	Italy (H)	7	8	Qualified as hosts
2	China	10	11	Qualified from previous World Cup ranking
3	Great Britain	11	16	

Italy qualified for the finals as host of that stage, while China qualified as the third placed team with the next best finish at the previous World Cup.

== Finals ==
=== Group A ===
Pos	Team	Pld	W	L	RF	RA	RD	PCT	GB	Qualification
1	United States	3	3	0	18	2	+16	1.000	—	Advance to Super Round
2	Canada	3	2	1	14	11	+3	.667	1	Advance to Super Round
3	Italy (H)	3	1	2	10	12	−2	.333	2	Advance to Placement Round
4	China	3	0	3	2	19	−17	.000	3	Advance to Placement Round

Source: WBSC
Rules for classification: 1) Wins/losses; 2) Head to head; 3) Head to head runs against; 4) Runs against; 5) Head to head
(H) Hosts

Date	Local time	Road team	Score	Home team	Inn.	Venue	Game duration	Attendance	Boxscore
15 July 2024	16:30	Canada	2–5	United States	7	Campo Comunale da Softball	2:00	180	Boxscore
15 July 2024	20:30	China	0–6	Italy	7	Campo Comunale da Softball	1:44	2,000	Boxscore
16 July 2024	14:00	China	2–7	Canada	7	Campo Comunale da Softball	2:11	150	Boxscore
16 July 2024	20:30	Italy	0–7	United States	5	Campo Comunale da Softball	1:39	2,300	Boxscore
17 July 2024	14:00	United States	6–0	China	7	Campo Comunale da Softball	2:21	200	Boxscore
17 July 2024	20:30	Italy	4–5	Canada	7	Campo Comunale da Softball	2:05	2,100	Boxscore

=== Group B ===
Pos	Team	Pld	W	L	RF	RA	RD	PCT	GB	Qualification
1	Japan	3	3	0	15	3	+12	1.000	—	Advance to Super Round
2	Netherlands	3	2	1	12	7	+5	.667	1	Advance to Super Round
3	Puerto Rico	3	1	2	6	12	−6	.333	2	Advance to Placement Round
4	Australia	3	0	3	3	14	−11	.000	3	Advance to Placement Round

Source: WBSC
Rules for classification: 1) Wins/losses; 2) Head to head; 3) Head to head runs against; 4) Runs against; 5) Head to head

Date	Local time	Road team	Score	Home team	Inn.	Venue	Game duration	Attendance	Boxscore
15 July 2024	11:00	Australia	0–3	Japan	7	Campo Comunale da Softball	1:55	300	Boxscore
15 July 2024	14:00	Puerto Rico	1–3	Netherlands	7	Campo Comunale da Softball	2:02	200	Boxscore
16 July 2024	11:00	Japan	8–0	Puerto Rico	5	Campo Comunale da Softball	1:32	200	Boxscore
16 July 2024	17:30	Netherlands	6–2	Australia	7	Campo Comunale da Softball	2:44	500	Boxscore
17 July 2024	11:00	Netherlands	3–4	Japan	7	Campo Comunale da Softball	2:200	300	Boxscore
17 July 2024	17:30	Australia	1–5	Puerto Rico	7	Campo Comunale da Softball	2:28	300	Boxscore

=== Placement Round ===
Pos	Team	Pld	W	L	RF	RA	RD	PCT	GB
1	China	3	2	1	9	9	0	.667	—
2	Puerto Rico	3	2	1	14	11	+3	.667	—
3	Australia	3	1	2	6	11	−5	.333	1
4	Italy (H)	3	1	2	13	11	+2	.333	1

First match(es) will be played: 18 July 2024. Source: WBSC
Rules for classification: 1) Wins/losses; 2) Head to head; 3) Head to head runs against; 4) Runs against; 5) Head to head
(H) Hosts

Date	Local time	Road team	Score	Home team	Inn.	Venue	Game duration	Attendance	Boxscore
18 July 2024	11:00	China	5–2	Australia	10	Campo Comunale da Softball	2:53	150	Boxscore
18 July 2024	14:00	Puerto Rico	8–6	Italy	9	Campo Comunale da Softball	2:53	1,600	Boxscore
19 July 2024	11:00	China	4–1	Puerto Rico	8	Campo Comunale da Softball	2:18	100	Boxscore
19 July 2024	14:00	Australia	3–1	Italy	7	Campo Comunale da Softball	2:16	2,400	Boxscore

=== Super Round ===
Pos	Team	Pld	W	L	RF	RA	RD	PCT	GB	Qualification
1	United States	3	3	0	14	2	+12	1.000	—	Advance to Final
2	Japan	3	2	1	11	7	+4	.667	1	Advance to Final
3	Canada	3	1	2	10	15	−5	.333	2	Advance to Third place play-off
4	Netherlands	3	0	3	6	17	−11	.000	3	Advance to Third place play-off

Source: WBSC
Rules for classification: 1) Wins/losses; 2) Head to head; 3) Head to head runs against; 4) Runs against; 5) Head to head

Date	Local time	Road team	Score	Home team	Inn.	Venue	Game duration	Attendance	Boxscore
18 July 2024	11:00	United States	2–0	Japan	7	Campo Comunale da Softball	1:50	450	Boxscore
18 July 2024	17:30	Netherlands	3–6	Canada	7	Campo Comunale da Softball	2:30	500	Boxscore
19 July 2024	11:00	Canada	2–7	Japan	7	Campo Comunale da Softball	2:13	180	Boxscore
19 July 2024	17:30	Netherlands	0–7	United States	5	Campo Comunale da Softball	1:41	900	Boxscore

== Final Round ==
=== Third place play-off ===
20 July 2024 17:00 Campo Comunale da Softball
Team	1	2	3	4	5	6	7	8	9	10	11	R	H	E
Netherlands	0	0	5	0	0	0	0	1	0	1	0	7	9	0
Canada (11)	0	0	0	1	0	4	0	1	0	1	4	11	11	1
WP: Morgan Rackel LP: J'dah Catherine Genevieve Girigorie; Home runs: NED: Laura Wissink; CAN: Callum Pilgrim, Natalie Wideman; Attendance: 2,450; Boxscore

=== Final ===
20 July 2024 20:00 Campo Comunale da Softball
Team	1	2	3	4	5	6	7	R	H	E
Japan	0	2	0	4	0	0	0	6	11	0
United States	1	0	0	0	0	0	0	1	5	2
WP: Miu Goto LP: Kelly Maxwell Sv: Yukiko Ueno; Attendance: 2,500; Boxscore

== Statistics ==
The statistics below include all group stage and finals games.

=== Homeruns ===
There have been 34 homeruns scored in 52 matches, for an average of 0.65 homeruns per match (as of 26 July 2023).

2 homeruns

- (Canada) Emma Entzminger
- (Japan) Nodoka Harada
- (Japan) Hotaru Tsukamoto
- (United States) Alison Aguilar

1 homerun

- (Australia) Philippa Adkins
- (Australia) Jade Wall
- (Canada) Kelsey Harshman
- (Canada) Kianna Jones
- (Canada) Janet Leung
- (China) Min Ren
- (China) Jiaxin Xie
- (Chinese Taipei) Chia-Yun Chang
- (Chinese Taipei) Szu-Shih Li
- (Chinese Taipei) Chia-Wen Shen
- (United Kingdom) Georgina Corrick
- (United Kingdom) Kendyl Scott
- (Italy) Mckenzie Barbara
- (Italy) Giulia Koutsoyanopulos
- (Italy) Erika Piancastelli
- (Japan) Kyoko Ishikawa
- (Japan) Kanna Kudo
- (Japan) Minori Naito
- (Netherlands) Dinet Oosting
- (Netherlands) Maxime van Dalen
- (Philippines) Nicole Hammoude
- (Spain) Meritxell Blesa
- (Spain) Uxua Modrego
- (United States) Kiara Robinson-Milloy
- (Venezuela) Yuruby Alicart
- (Venezuela) Yakary Molina

=== Player of the day ===
Player of the day
Day	Player	Notes
11 Jul	(United Kingdom) Georgina Corrick	7 IP; 3 H 0 R 1 BB; 7 K
12 Jul	(Australia) Kaia Parnaby	7 IP; 1 H 0 R 0 BB; 14 K
13 Jul	(United States) Megan Faraimo	8 IP; 1 H 0 R 2 BB; 10 K
18 Jul	(Cuba) Yanisleidys Casanova	3–3; 2 RBI; 3 B 5 TB
19 Jul	(Cuba) Yilian Tornes	7 IP; 9 SO; 3 H 1 R
20 Jul	(Puerto Rico) Aleshia Ocasio	7 IP; 8 SO; 5 H 1 R
21 Jul	(Cuba) Yilian Tornes	7 IP; 13 SO; 4 H 1 R
22 Jul	(Italy) Alice Nicolini	7 IP; 4 SO; 3 H 2 R CG
23 Jul	(Italy) Marta Gasparotto	4–8; 4 RBI; 2 R 5 TB
24 Jul	(Canada) Morgan Rackel	6.2 IP; 4 SO; 6 H 2 R
25 Jul	(Philippines) Nicole Hammoude	4–5; 4 RBI; 5 R HR; 9 TB

== Awards ==
=== Most Valuable Players ===
==== Group stage ====
- Group A – (United States) Hannah Flippen
- Group B – (Puerto Rico) Aleshia Ocasio
- Group C – (Japan) Ayane Nakagawa

==== Finals ====
- (Japan) Yukiko Ueno

== Symbols ==
=== Match balls ===
The match balls that will be used for the 2024 tournament are the Mizuno M170 balls.
