= Netherlands women's national softball team =

Information
- Country: Netherlands
- Federation: Royal Netherlands Baseball and Softball Federation
- Confederation: WBSC Europe
- WBSC World Rank: 6 ▼1 (31 December 2025)

Olympic Games
- Appearances: 2 (First in 1996)
- Best result: 7th

Women's Softball World Cup
- Appearances: 14 (First in 1974)
- Best result: 4th

USA Softball International Cup
- Appearances: 3 (First in 2009)
- Best result: 4th

Netherlands women's national softball team
Medal record

Representing Netherlands

European Championship
Gold medal – first place	1979 Rovereto	
Gold medal – first place	1981 Haarlem	
Gold medal – first place	1983 Parma	
Gold medal – first place	1984 Antwerp	
Gold medal – first place	1988 Hørsholm	
Gold medal – first place	1990 Genoa	
Gold medal – first place	2009 Valencia	
Gold medal – first place	2011 Ronchi dei Legionari	
Gold medal – first place	2013 Prague	
Gold medal – first place	2017 Bollate	
Gold medal – first place	2022 Sant Boi	
Silver medal – second place	1986 Antwerp	
Silver medal – second place	1992 Bussum	
Silver medal – second place	1995 Settimo Torinese	
Silver medal – second place	1997 Prague	
Silver medal – second place	2007 Amsterdam	
Silver medal – second place	2015 Rosmalen	
Silver medal – second place	2019 Ostrava	
Silver medal – second place	2021 Friuli Venezia Giulia	
Silver medal – second place	2025 Prague	
Bronze medal – third place	2001 Prague	
Bronze medal – third place	2003 Saronno	
Bronze medal – third place	2005 Prague	

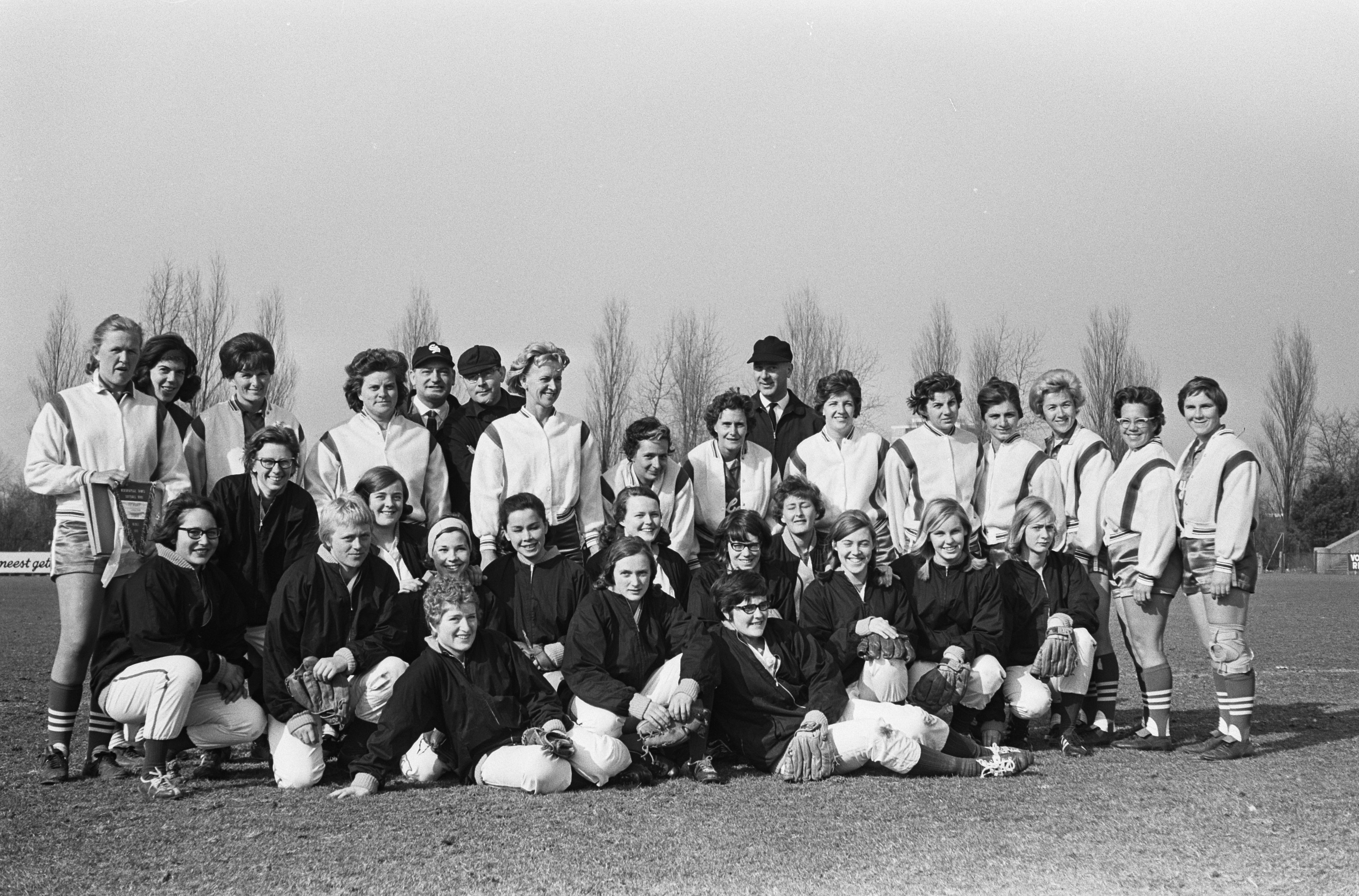
The Netherlands women's national softball team together with the United States women's national softball team in 1965.

The Netherlands women's national softball team is the national team of the Kingdom of the Netherlands. It is governed by the Royal Netherlands Baseball and Softball Federation (Dutch: Koninklijke Nederlandse Baseball en Softball Bond). It is a member nation of the Confederation of European Baseball and the International Baseball Federation.

== History ==
The team competed at the 1990 ISF Women's World Championship where they finished with five wins and four losses. The team competed at the 1994 ISF Women's World Championship where they finished eighth. The team competed at the 1998 ISF Women's World Championship where they finished ninth. The team competed at the 2002 ISF Women's World Championship where they finished eleventh. The team competed at the 2010 ISF Women's World Championship where they finished eighth.

They have won the Women's Softball European Championship eleven times, second most to only Italy. Their latest European title came in 2022.

== Results and fixtures ==
The following is a list of match results in the last 12 months, as well as any future matches that have been scheduled.

Win Draw Loss Fixture

=== 2022 ===
2022 European Championship Round Robin 1	24 July	Germany	0–7 (F/5)	Netherlands	Camp Municipal de Sófbol de Viladecans, Spain
2022 European Championship Round Robin 1	16:30 UTC+2		Boxscore		Attendance: 50

2022 European Championship Round Robin 2	25 July	Czech Republic	0–7 (F/6)	Netherlands	Campo Municipal de Sófbol Carlos Pérez de Rozas, Spain
2022 European Championship Round Robin 2	18:00 UTC+2		Boxscore		Attendance: 160

2022 European Championship Round Robin 2	26 July	Poland	0–16 (F/3)	Netherlands	Estadio Municipal de Sófbol Antonio Hervás, Spain
2022 European Championship Round Robin 2	12:00 UTC+2		Boxscore		Attendance: 63

2022 European Championship Round Robin 2	26 July	Greece	1–8 (F/5)	Netherlands	Estadio Municipal de Sófbol Antonio Hervás, Spain
2022 European Championship Round Robin 2	17:15 UTC+2		Boxscore		Attendance: 274

2022 European Championship Round Robin 2	27 July	Slovakia	0–12 (F/4)	Netherlands	Campo Municipal de Sófbol Carlos Pérez de Rozas, Spain
2022 European Championship Round Robin 2	11:15 UTC+2		Boxscore		Attendance: 72

2022 European Championship Round Robin 2	27 July	Spain	2–7	Netherlands	Campo Municipal de Sófbol Carlos Pérez de Rozas, Spain
2022 European Championship Round Robin 2	15:45 UTC+2		Boxscore		Attendance: 235

2022 European Championship Final Round Robin	28 July	Great Britain	5–0	Netherlands	Estadio Municipal de Sófbol Antonio Hervás, Spain
2022 European Championship Final Round Robin	13:30 UTC+2		Boxscore		Attendance: 269

2022 European Championship Final Round Robin	28 July	Italy	2–3	Netherlands	Estadio Municipal de Sófbol Antonio Hervás, Spain
2022 European Championship Final Round Robin	21:30 UTC+2		Boxscore		Attendance: 469

2022 European Championship Final Round Robin	29 July	Israel	6–14 (F/5)	Netherlands	Estadio Municipal de Sófbol Antonio Hervás, Spain
2022 European Championship Final Round Robin	15:00 UTC+2		Boxscore		Attendance: 95

2022 European Championship Final	30 July	Netherlands	7–0	Great Britain	Estadio Municipal de Sófbol Antonio Hervás, Spain
2022 European Championship Final	18:00 UTC+2		Boxscore		Attendance: 621

=== 2023 ===
2024 World Cup Group	18 July	Netherlands	3-4	Cuba	Camp Municipal de Beisbol i Sofbol de València, Spain
2024 World Cup Group	11:00 UTC+2		Boxscore

2024 World Cup Group	19 July	Netherlands	4-5	China	Camp Municipal de Beisbol i Sofbol de València, Spain
2024 World Cup Group	10:00 UTC+2		Boxscore

2024 World Cup Group	20 July	Spain	2-3	Netherlands	Camp Municipal de Beisbol i Sofbol de València, Spain
2024 World Cup Group	10:00 UTC+2		Boxscore

2024 World Cup Group	20 July	South Africa	1-11	Netherlands	Camp Municipal de Beisbol i Sofbol de València, Spain
2024 World Cup Group	15:00 UTC+2		Boxscore

2024 World Cup Group	21 July	Puerto Rico	6-1	Netherlands	Camp Municipal de Beisbol i Sofbol de València, Spain
2024 World Cup Group	10:00 UTC+2		Boxscore

== Competitive record ==
=== Women's Softball World Cup ===
Women's Softball World Cup record
Year	Host	Round	Pos	Pld	W	L	RS	RA	Squad
1965	Australia	Did not enter							
1970	Japan	Did not enter							
1974	United States	?	5th	?	?	?	?	?	
1978	El Salvador	?	6th	?	?	?	?	?	
1982	Taiwan	?	7th	?	?	?	?	?	
1986	New Zealand	?	7th	?	?	?	?	?	
1990	United States	Group stage	9th	9	5	4	?	?	
1994	Canada	Play-offs	8th	7	5	2	67	20	
1998	Japan	Group stage	9th	8	4	4	?	?	
2002	Canada	Group stage	11th	7	2	5	31	36	
2006	China	Group stage	12th	7	3	4	28	34	
2010	Venezuela	Play-offs	8th	8	4	4	25	26	
2012	Canada	Play-offs	6th	8	5	3	?	?	
2014	Netherlands	Play-offs	6th	9	5	4	?	?	
2016	Canada	Fourth place	4th	9	7	2	?	?	
2018	Japan	Play-offs	7th	8	3	5	?	?	
2022	United States	Did not qualify							
2024	Italy	Fourth place	4th	13	6	7	50	48	
Total		Fourth place	15/18	93	49	44	201	164	—

=== European Championship ===
Year	1979	1981	1983	1984	1986	1988	1990	1992	1995	1997	1999	2001	2003	2005	2007	2009	2011	2013	2015	2017	2019	2021	2022	2024
Standing	1	1	1	1	2	1	1	2	2	2	4	3	3	3	2	1	1	1	2	1	2	2	1	3

=== Olympics ===
Summer Olympics record
Year	Round	Position	W	L	RS	RA	Squad
(United States) Atlanta 1996	Group stage	7th	1	6	4	32	Squad
(Australia) Sydney 2000	Did not qualify						
(Greece) Athens 2004	Did not qualify						
(China) Beijing 2008	Group stage	8th	1	6	8	48	Squad
(Japan) Tokyo 2020	Did not qualify						
Total	2/4	0 titles	2	12	12	80	—

=== Other tournaments ===
Japan Softball Cup
2006: 4th

== List of managers ==
Manager	Period
(Netherlands) Herman Beidschat	1964-1965
(Netherlands) Jaap Visser	1966
(Netherlands) Gé Hoogenbos	1967-1968
(Netherlands) Nol Houtkamp	1969-1983
(Netherlands) Teus Morren	1984
(United States) Don Wedman	1985-1986
(United States) Diane Schumacher	1987-1990
(Netherlands) George Presburg	1991-1993
(Netherlands) Ruud Elfers	1994-1996
(United States) Craig Montvidas	1997-1999
(Netherlands) Ruud Elfers	2000
(Netherlands) Rob Walgien	2001
(Netherlands) Gonny Reijnen	2002-2004
(United States) Liz Kelly	2005-2008
(United States) Craig Montvidas	2009 - 2015
(United States) Tracy Bunge and (Netherlands) Juni Fransisca	2015
(Netherlands) Juni Fransisca	2016 -
