= New Zealand women's national softball team =

Information
- Country: New Zealand
- Federation: Softball New Zealand
- Confederation: WBSC Oceania
- Manager: Donny Hale
- WBSC World Rank: 30 ▲4 (31 December 2024)

Olympic Games
- Appearances: 1 (First in 2000)
- Best result: 6th

Women's Softball World Cup
- Appearances: 17 (First in 1965)
- Best result: (gold) 1st (1 time, in 1982)

New Zealand women's national softball team, nicknamed the White Sox, is the women's national softball team for New Zealand. The "White Sox" name is one of many national team nicknames (indirectly) related to the All Blacks as well as to the famous Boston Red Sox and Chicago White Sox baseball teams.

The team competed at the 1990 ISF Women's World Championship in Normal, Illinois where they finished with 8 wins and 1 loss. The team competed at the 1994 ISF Women's World Championship in St. John's, Newfoundland where they finished sixth. The team competed at the 1998 ISF Women's World Championship in Fujinomiya City, Japan where they finished eleventh. The team competed at the 2002 ISF Women's World Championship in Saskatoon, Saskatchewan where they finished sixth. The team competed at the 2006 ISF Women's World Championship in Beijing, China where they finished eleventh. The team competed at the 2010 ISF Women's World Championship in Caracas, Venezuela where they finished twelfth.

== Results and fixtures ==
The following is a list of match results in the last 12 months, as well as any future matches that have been scheduled.

Win Draw Loss Fixture

=== 2023 ===
Friendly	17 July	New Zealand	5–12	Czech Republic	Campo Softball Polisportiva Buscherini, Italy
Friendly	11:00 UTC+2		Boxscore

Friendly	17 July	New Zealand	2–9	Czech Republic	Campo Softball Polisportiva Buscherini, Italy
Friendly	17:00 UTC+2		Boxscore

Friendly	18 July	New Zealand	2–8	Czech Republic	Campo Softball Polisportiva Buscherini, Italy
Friendly	14:00 UTC+2		Boxscore

Friendly	18 July	New Zealand	3–11	Czech Republic	Campo Softball Polisportiva Buscherini, Italy
Friendly	16:00 UTC+2		Boxscore

Friendly	19 July	New Zealand	4–2	Softball Forlì	Campo Softball Polisportiva Buscherini, Italy
Friendly	19:00 UTC+2		Boxscore

2024 World Cup Group	22 July	New Zealand	2–16 (F/4)	Japan	Campo Comunale da Softball, Italy
2024 World Cup Group	14:00 UTC+2	LP: Loran Parker	Boxscore	WP: Misaki Katsumata; HR: Nodoka Harada, Hotaru Tsukamoto	Attendance: 700; Umpires: Mariana Prins (HP), Steven McCown (1B), Sabrina Fabrizi (2B), Alen Magdalenić (3B)

2024 World Cup Group	23 July	Italy	9–0	New Zealand	Campo Cav. Gino Michelutti, Italy
2024 World Cup Group	11:00 UTC+2	WP: Ilaria Cacciamani; HR: McKenzie Barbara, Erika Piancastelli	Boxscore	LP: Tyneesha Houkamau	Attendance: 300; Umpires: Abel Mataboge (HP), Yu-Sung Lin (1B), Maykel Garcia Cue (2B), Jose Chaparro (3B)

2024 World Cup Group	24 July	New Zealand	4–3	Venezuela	Campo Cav. Gino Michelutti, Italy
2024 World Cup Group	17:00 UTC+2	WP: Christine Parker	Boxscore	LP: Loreley Linares	Attendance: 200; Umpires: Yu-Sung Lin (HP), Sabrina Fabrizi (1B), Zhiling Yu (2B), Maykel Garcia Cue (3B)

2024 World Cup Group	25 July	New Zealand	0–4	Canada	Campo Comunale da Softball, Italy
2024 World Cup Group	11:00 UTC+2	LP: Amy Begg	Boxscore	WP: Dawn Bodrug; HR: Kianna Jones	Attendance: 80; Umpires: Maykel Garcia Cue (HP), Jose Chaparro (1B), Sabrina Fabrizi (2B), Yu-Sung Lin (3B)

2024 World Cup Group	25 July	Philippines	5–3	New Zealand	Campo Comunale da Softball, Italy
2024 World Cup Group	17:00 UTC+2	WP: Royevel Palma; HR: Nicole Hammoude	Boxscore	LP: Tyneesha Houkamau	Attendance: 75; Umpires: Alen Magdalenić (HP), Yu-Sung Lin (1B), Jose Chaparro (2B), Maykel Garcia Cue (3B)

2024 World Cup Group 5th place	26 July	Venezuela	4–0	New Zealand	Campo Comunale da Softball, Italy
2024 World Cup Group 5th place	11:00 UTC+2	WP: Michelle Floyd; HR: Yuruby Alicart	Boxscore	LP: Tyla Morrison	Attendance: 130; Umpires: Alen Magdalenić (HP), Yu-Sung Lin (1B), Steven McCown (2B), Abel Mataboge (3B)

== Players ==
=== Current squad ===
The following players were called up for the 2024 Women's Softball World Cup group stage from 22–26 July 2023.

- Lara Andrews (captain)
- Amy Begg
- Erin Blackmore
- Rebecca Bromhead (vice-captain)
- Meeki Cooper Nicola
- Emma Francis
- Shyah Hale
- Tyneesha Houkamau
- Nerissa McDowell
- Tyla Morrison
- Katrina Nukunuku
- Loran Parker
- Pallas Potter
- Lace Tangianau
- Otila Tavite
- Brooke Whiteman

== Competitive Record ==
=== Women's Softball World Cup ===
Women's Softball World Cup record
Year	Host	Round	Pos	Pld	W	L	RF	RA	Squad
1965	Australia	Fourth place	4th						
1970	Japan	?	7th						
1974	United States	?	9th						
1978	El Salvador	Third place	3rd						
1982	Taiwan	Champions	1st						
1986	New Zealand	Third place	3rd						
1990	United States	Runners-up	2nd	11	9	2			
1994	Canada	Play-offs	6th	9	6	3	67	3	
1998	Japan	Group stage	11th	7	3	4		31	
2002	Canada	Group stage	6th	9	6	3	42	21	
2006	China	Group stage	11th	7	3	4	8	32	
2010	Venezuela	Group stage	12th	7	2	5	21	55	
2012	Canada	Group stage	13th	7	2	5			
2014	Netherlands	Play-offs	8th	8	3	5	16	33	
2016	Canada	Championship round	8th	7	5	2	57	24	
2018	Japan	Placement round	13th	8	2	6	17	33	
2022	United States	Did not qualify							
2024	Italy	Group stage	TBC	5	1	4	9	37	Squad
Total		1 title	17/18	85	42	43	237	269	—

=== World Cup of Softball ===
(United States) World Cup of Softball record
Year	Result	Matches	Wins	Losses	RF	RA
2005	Did not enter					
2006	Did not enter					
2007	Did not enter					
2009	Did not enter					
2010	Did not enter					
2011	Did not enter					
2012	Did not enter					
2013	Did not enter					
2014	Did not enter					
2015	Did not enter					
2016	8th	7	2	5	12	29
2017	Did not enter					
Total	1/12	7	2	5	12	29

=== Olympics ===
Olympics record
Year	Host	Round	Pos	Pld	W	L	RF	RA	Squad
1996	United States	Did not qualify							
2000	Australia	Group stage	6th	7	2	5	12	22	Squad
2004	Greece	Did not qualify							
2008	China	Did not qualify							
2020	Japan	Did not qualify							
Total		Group stage	1/5	7	2	5	12	22	—
