= Great Britain women's national softball team =

Information
- Country: Great Britain
- Federation: British Softball Federation
- Confederation: WBSC Europe
- Manager: Tara Henry
- WBSC World Rank: 12 (31 December 2025)

Women's Softball World Cup
- Appearances: 7 (First in 1994)
- Best result: 10th

USA Softball International Cup
- Appearances: 2 (First in 2006)
- Best result: 5th

Great Britain women's national softball team
Medal record

Representing Great Britain

European Championship
Silver medal – second place	2009 Valencia	
Silver medal – second place	2022 Sant Boi	
Silver medal – second place	2024 Utrecht	
Bronze medal – third place	2005 Prague	
Bronze medal – third place	2011 Ronchi dei Legionari	
Bronze medal – third place	2017 Bollate	
Bronze medal – third place	2019 Ostrava	
Bronze medal – third place	2025 Prague	

Great Britain women's national softball team is the national team for Great Britain. The team competed at the 1994 ISF Women's World Championship where they finished twenty-third. The team competed at the 2006 ISF Women's World Championship where they finished tenth. The team competed at the 2010 ISF Women's World Championship where they finished eleventh. The team competed at the 2022 Women's Softball European Championship where they won a silver medal.

== Results and fixtures ==
The following is a list of match results in the last 12 months, as well as any future matches that have been scheduled.

Win Draw Loss Fixture

=== 2022 ===
2022 European Championship Round Robin 1	24 July	Turkey	0–15 (F/3)	Great Britain	Campo Municipal de Sófbol Carlos Pérez de Rozas, Spain
2022 European Championship Round Robin 1	11:30 UTC+2		Boxscore		Attendance: 50

2022 European Championship Round Robin 1	24 July	Great Britain	17–0 (F/3)	Ukraine	Campo Municipal de Sófbol Carlos Pérez de Rozas, Spain
2022 European Championship Round Robin 1	14:00 UTC+2		Boxscore		Attendance: 210

2022 European Championship Round Robin 2	25 July	Great Britain	7–0 (F/5)	Germany	Campo Municipal de Béisbol Can Torelló, Spain
2022 European Championship Round Robin 2	15:45 UTC+2		Boxscore		Attendance: 70

2022 European Championship Round Robin 2	26 July	Great Britain	11–4 (F/5)	Ireland	Camp Municipal de Sófbol de Viladecans, Spain
2022 European Championship Round Robin 2	09:00 UTC+2		Boxscore		Attendance: 50

2022 European Championship Round Robin 2	26 July	Great Britain	10–0 (F/4)	Israel	Camp Municipal de Sófbol de Viladecans, Spain
2022 European Championship Round Robin 2	22:30 UTC+2		Boxscore		Attendance: 40

2022 European Championship Round Robin 2	27 July	Great Britain	2–1	Italy	Estadio Municipal de Sófbol Antonio Hervás, Spain
2022 European Championship Round Robin 2	13:30 UTC+2		Boxscore		Attendance: 88

2022 European Championship Round Robin 2	27 July	Great Britain	11–1 (F/4)	France	Estadio Municipal de Sófbol Antonio Hervás, Spain
2022 European Championship Round Robin 2	18:00 UTC+2		Boxscore		Attendance: 98

2022 European Championship Final Round Robin	28 July	Great Britain	5–0	Netherlands	Estadio Municipal de Sófbol Antonio Hervás, Spain
2022 European Championship Final Round Robin	13:30 UTC+2		Boxscore		Attendance: 269

2022 European Championship Final Round Robin	28 July	Spain	0–10 (F/4)	Great Britain	Estadio Municipal de Sófbol Antonio Hervás, Spain
2022 European Championship Final Round Robin	19:45 UTC+2		Boxscore		Attendance: 399

2022 European Championship Final Round Robin	29 July	Czech Republic	9–0 (F/5)	Great Britain	Estadio Municipal de Sófbol Antonio Hervás, Spain
2022 European Championship Final Round Robin	20:15 UTC+2		Boxscore		Attendance: 256

2022 European Championship Final	30 July	Netherlands	7–0	Great Britain	Estadio Municipal de Sófbol Antonio Hervás, Spain
2022 European Championship Final	18:00 UTC+2		Boxscore		Attendance: 621

=== 2023 ===
Exhibition	6 July	Oklahoma City Spark	6–1	Great Britain	Farnham Park, England
Exhibition			Boxscore

Exhibition	7 July	Oklahoma City Spark	9–1	Great Britain	Farnham Park, England
Exhibition			Boxscore

2024 World Cup Group	11 July	Great Britain	2–0	Australia	O'Dwyers GAA, Ireland
2024 World Cup Group	11:00 UTC+1	WP: Georgina Corrick (1–0); HR: Kendyl Scott (1)	Boxscore	LP: Ellen Roberts (0–1)	Attendance: 80; Umpires: HP – Marni Bodnarchuk, 1B – Trevor Topping, 2B – Anthony Kaiaruna, 3B – Michal Židek

2024 World Cup Group	12 July	Great Britain	2–0	Chinese Taipei	O'Dwyers GAA, Ireland
2024 World Cup Group	10:00 UTC+1	WP: Georgina Corrick (2–0); HR: Georgina Corrick (1)	Boxscore	LP: An-Ju Chiu (0–2)	Attendance: 125; Umpires: HP – Michal Židek, 1B – Renzo Ruiz, 2B – Sara Dielen, 3B – Norikazu Hamasaki

2024 World Cup Group	13 July	Ireland	0–7 (F/5)	Great Britain	O'Dwyers GAA, Ireland
2024 World Cup Group	18:30 UTC+1	LP: Kailey O'Connor (1–1)	Boxscore	WP: Georgina Corrick (3–0)	Attendance: 250; Umpires: HP – Galip Sönmez, 1B – Patrick Reus, 2B – Norikazu Hamasaki, 3B – Renzo Ruiz

2024 World Cup Group	14 July	Botswana	Rainout	Great Britain	O'Dwyers GAA, Ireland
2024 World Cup Group	13:00 UTC+1		Boxscore

2024 World Cup Group	14 July	Great Britain	Rainout	United States	O'Dwyers GAA, Ireland
2024 World Cup Group	15:00 UTC+1		Boxscore

2024 World Cup Group Final	15 July	Great Britain	0–7 (F/5)	United States	O'Dwyers GAA, Ireland
2024 World Cup Group Final	8:00 UTC+1	LP: Ann Faulkner (0–1)	Boxscore	WP: Ally Carda (2–0); HR: Alison Aguilar (2)	Attendance: 55; Umpires: HP – Marni Bodnarchuk, 1B – Renzo Ruiz, 2B – Norikazu Hamasaki, 3B – Patrick Reus

2024 World Cup Group Repecharge	15 July	Australia	4–1	Great Britain	O'Dwyers GAA, Ireland
2024 World Cup Group Repecharge	19:35 UTC+1	WP: Ellen Roberts (1–1)	Boxscore	LP: Georgina Corrick (3–1)	Attendance: 56; Umpires: HP – Trevor Topping, 1B – Galip Sönmez, 2B – Michal Židek, 3B – Anthony Kaiaruna

== Medal record ==
Competition	1st place, gold medalist(s)	2nd place, silver medalist(s)	3rd place, bronze medalist(s)	Total
Olympic Games	0	0	0	0
World Championship	0	0	0	0
European Championship	0	3	4	7
Total	0	3	4	7
