= 1978 Women's Softball World Championship =

Women's Softball World Championship

Tournament details
- Host country: El Salvador
- Teams: 15
- Defending champions: United States (1974)

Final positions
- Champions: United States (2nd title)
- Runner-up: Canada
- Third place: New Zealand
- Fourth place: Taiwan

The 1978 ISF Women's World Championship for softball was held in October 1978 in San Salvador, El Salvador.

Canada was given the hosting rights for the tournament in 1975. However the Canadian government withdrew financial support upon learning Taiwan (Republic of China) will be joining. The tournament was later considered to be held in Nagoya, Japan. However Japan also withdrew following pressure by China, which objects to the participation of Taiwan.

South Africa and Rhodesia were dissuaded by the International Softball Federation from accepting their invitations.

United States are the champions.

== Final round ==
Final
22 October
United States	4
Canada	0
Bronze medal game
22 October
New Zealand	4
Taiwan	2

== Final standings ==
Rank	Team
1st place, gold medalist(s)	United States
2nd place, silver medalist(s)	Canada
3rd place, bronze medalist(s)	New Zealand
4	Taiwan
5	Australia
6	Netherlands
7	Bahamas
8	Italy
9	Belize
10	El Salvador
11	Puerto Rico
12	Guatemala
13	Panama
14	Zambia
15	Nicaragua

Source: WBSC
