= 1986 Women's Softball World Championship =

Women's Softball World Championship

Tournament details
- Host country: New Zealand
- Teams: 12

Final positions
- Champions: United States (3rd title)
- Runner-up: China
- Third place: New Zealand
- Fourth place: Canada

The 1986 ISF Women's World Championship for softball was held 18 to 27 January 1986 in Auckland, New Zealand.

== Final standings ==
Rank	Team
1st place, gold medalist(s)	United States
2nd place, silver medalist(s)	China
3rd place, bronze medalist(s)	New Zealand
4	Canada
5	Puerto Rico
6	Chinese Taipei
7	Netherlands
8	Australia
9	Japan
10	Italy
11	Indonesia
12	Zimbabwe

Source: WBSC
