= Hotaru Tsukamoto =

Japanese softball player

Honda Reverta – No. 28
- Outfielder
- Born: 17 October 1999 (age 27)
Medals
Women's softball
Representing Japan
World Cup
Gold medal – first place	2024 Castions di Strada	Team
Asian Games
Gold medal – first place	2022 Hangzhou	Team
Gold medal – first place	2026 Aichi–Nagoya	Team

Hotaru Tsukamoto (Japanese: 塚本 蛍, Tsukamoto Hotaru; born 17 October 1999) is a Japanese softball player who plays as an outfielder for Honda Reverta and the Japan women's national softball team. She has won gold medals at the 2022 Asian Games, the 2024 Women's Softball World Cup and the 2026 Asian Games.

== Career ==
Tsukamoto attended Saga Joshi Junior College High School in Saga Prefecture and subsequently joined Honda's women's softball team. She plays as an outfielder and has represented Honda in Japan's domestic softball competitions. She was named captain of Honda's team for the 2024 season.

Tsukamoto became a member of Japan's senior women's national softball team and competed at the 2022 Asian Games in Hangzhou, China, held in 2023. Japan won the women's softball tournament, earning the gold medal after defeating China in the final.

In July 2024, Tsukamoto represented Japan at the 2024 Women's Softball World Cup final stage in Castions di Strada, Italy. Japan defeated the United States 6–1 in the final to win the world title. Tsukamoto recorded a double during the championship game and contributed to Japan's victory.

Tsukamoto was selected for Japan's team at the 2026 Asian Games in Aichi and Nagoya. She appeared as an outfielder in the women's tournament, helping Japan progress through the preliminary round. In the game against Hong Kong on 28 September, she recorded a hit during Japan's 15–0 victory. She also hit a triple in the match against Singapore on 30 September, which Japan won 10–0.

Japan finished the preliminary round undefeated and faced China in the gold-medal game on 3 October 2026. Tsukamoto started as the designated player in the final, in which Japan won 7–0 in five innings. The victory secured Japan's seventh consecutive Asian Games gold medal in women's softball, and Tsukamoto won her second Asian Games gold medal.
