= Farnham Park =

Nature reserve in Surrey, England

Coordinates: 51.225°N 0.797°W

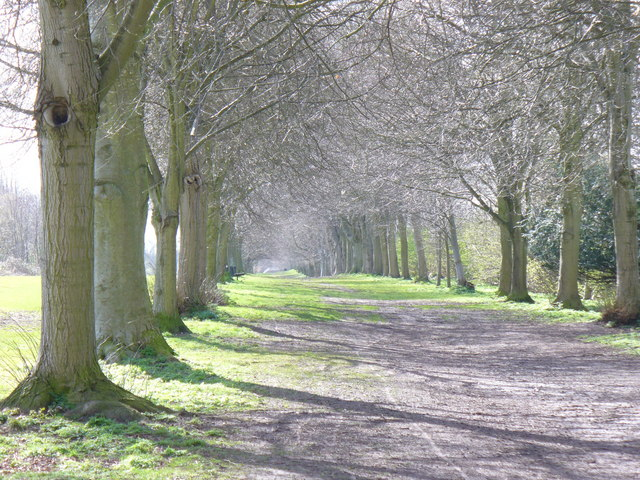
- Interactive map of Farnham Park
- Type: Local Nature Reserve
- Location: Farnham, Surrey
- OS grid: SU 841 480
- Area: 131.0 hectares (324 acres)
- Manager: Waverley Borough Council

Farnham Park is a 131-hectare (320-acre) Local Nature Reserve in Farnham in Surrey. It is owned and managed by Waverley Borough Council.

This medieval deer park has an avenue of trees which is over a kilometer long. Originally the trees were mature elms, but these succumbed to the Dutch elm disease in the early 1970s and were replaced with lime and beech. There is grassland, woodland, ponds and streams.
