= Softball at the 2022 World Games =

- Venue: Hoover Metropolitan Stadium
- Dates: July 9–13, 2022
- Competitors: from 8 nations

Medalists
1st place, gold medalist(s)		United States
2nd place, silver medalist(s)		Japan
3rd place, bronze medalist(s)		Chinese Taipei

The softball competition at the 2022 World Games took place from July 9–13, 2022, in Birmingham in United States, at the University of Alabama Birmingham. Originally scheduled to take place in July 2021, the Games were rescheduled for July 2022 as a result of the 2020 Summer Olympics postponement due to the COVID-19 pandemic. Softball returned to the official programme of the World Games after nine years of absence.

This tournament also served as the world championship for softball.

== Format ==
A total of eight teams are divided into two groups of four teams each. In each group, teams played against each other once in a single round-robin format, for a total of three matches per team. The top two of each of the two groups advanced to the knockout stage.

== Qualification ==
Eight teams qualified, including United States, which, as host nation, qualifies automatically. Qualification places were primarily based on national softball ranking. The last berth was awarded at the European Softball Championship, which was scheduled to take place in 2020 but have been moved due to the COVID-19 pandemic.

=== Qualified teams ===
Team	Date of qualification	Method of qualification
United States	22 April 2020	Host
Japan	22 April 2020	Finished 2nd in WBSC ranking
Canada	22 April 2020	Finished 3rd in WBSC ranking
Mexico	22 April 2020	Finished 5th in WBSC ranking
Chinese Taipei	22 April 2020	Finished 6th in WBSC ranking
~~China~~	22 April 2020	Finished 7th in WBSC ranking
Australia	22 April 2020	Finished 8th in WBSC ranking
Italy	3 July 2021	Finished 1st at the 2021 Women's Softball European Championship
Puerto Rico	24 March 2022	Wildcard

Notes

1. China originally qualified by virtue of their WBSC ranking. However, China withdrew due to COVID-19 travel restrictions by the Chinese government on March 24, 2022. WBSC replaced China with Puerto Rico on March 24, 2022.

== Competition schedule ==
The match schedule of the softball tournament was unveiled on 24 February 2022.

Legend

G	Group stage	C	Classification matches	½	Semi-finals	B	Bronze medal match	F	Gold medal match

9 Sat	10 Sun	11 Mon	12 Tue		13 Wed		
G			C	½	C	B	F

== Group stage ==
=== Group A ===
Pos	Team	Pld	W	L	RF	RA	RD	PCT	GB	Qualification
1	United States (H)	3	3	0	23	2	+21	1.000	—	Advance to knockout stage
2	Chinese Taipei	3	2	1	13	12	+1	.667	1	Advance to knockout stage
3	Canada	3	1	2	16	23	−7	.333	2	Advance to classification stage
4	Italy	3	0	3	5	20	−15	.000	3	Advance to classification stage

Updated to match(es) played on unknown. Source: WBSC
(H) Hosts

=== Group B ===
Pos	Team	Pld	W	L	RF	RA	RD	PCT	GB	Qualification
1	Japan	3	3	0	22	1	+21	1.000	—	Advance to knockout stage
2	Australia	3	2	1	12	10	+2	.667	1	Advance to knockout stage
3	Puerto Rico	3	1	2	3	10	−7	.333	2	Advance to classification stage
4	Mexico	3	0	3	1	17	−16	.000	3	Advance to classification stage

Updated to match(es) played on unknown. Source: WBSC

== Classification stage ==
=== Bracket ===
5th–8th Classification
July 12 – Birmingham
Canada (6)	8
Mexico	1
July 12 – Birmingham
Puerto Rico (5)	7
Italy	0

Fifth place play-off
July 13 – Birmingham
Canada	0
Puerto Rico	1
Seventh place play-off
July 13 – Birmingham
Mexico	1
Italy	4

=== Seventh place play-off ===
July 13 11:00 (CDT) Hoover Metropolitan Stadium 31 °C (88 °F)
Team	1	2	3	4	5	6	7	R	H	E
Mexico	1	0	0	0	1	0	0	1	6	0
Italy	1	0	0	0	0	3	X	4	4	2
WP: Alexia Lacatena LP: Sierra Hyland; Boxscore

=== Fifth place play-off ===
July 13 02:00 (CDT) Hoover Metropolitan Stadium 32 °C (90 °F)
Team	1	2	3	4	5	6	7	R	H	E
Puerto Rico	1	0	0	0	0	0	0	1	5	0
Canada	0	0	0	0	0	0	0	0	2	1
WP: Aleshia Ocasio LP: Jorde Madison Chartrand; Boxscore

== Knockout stage ==
=== Bracket ===
Semi-finals
July 12 – Birmingham
Chinese Taipei	0
Japan (6)	7
July 12 – Birmingham
Australia	0
United States	5

Gold medal match
July 13 – Birmingham
Japan	2
United States	3
Bronze medal match
July 13 – Birmingham
Chinese Taipei	6
Australia	0

=== Semi-finals ===
July 12 05:00 (CDT) Hoover Metropolitan Stadium 33 °C (91 °F)
Team	1	2	3	4	5	6	7	R	H	E
Chinese Taipei	0	0	0	0	0	0	X	0	3	3
Japan (6)	0	2	0	0	4	1	X	7	9	0
WP: Miu Goto LP: Chiu An-Ju Sv: Sakura Miwa; Home runs: TPE: None; JPN: Yamato Fujita; Boxscore

July 12 08:00 (CDT) Hoover Metropolitan Stadium 29 °C (84 °F)
Team	1	2	3	4	5	6	7	R	H	E
Australia	0	0	0	0	0	0	0	0	1	1
United States	1	0	0	4	0	0	X	5	5	0
WP: Ally Carda LP: Ellen Roberts Sv: Montana Fouts; Boxscore

=== Bronze medal match ===
July 13 05:00 (CDT) Hoover Metropolitan Stadium 31 °C (88 °F)
Team	1	2	3	4	5	6	7	R	H	E
Australia	0	0	0	0	0	0	0	0	2	0
Chinese Taipei	1	2	0	1	2	0	X	6	11	0
WP: Ke Hsia-Ai LP: Ellen Roberts; Boxscore

=== Gold medal match ===
July 13 09:00 (CDT) Hoover Metropolitan Stadium 24 °C (75 °F)
Team	1	2	3	4	5	6	7	R	H	E
Japan	0	0	1	0	1	0	0	2	8	0
United States	0	3	0	0	0	0	X	3	5	1
WP: Monica Abbott LP: Sakura Miwa Sv: Ally Carda; Boxscore

== Medalists ==
Event	Gold	Silver	Bronze
Women's tournament	United States	Japan	Chinese Taipei

== See also ==
- Softball at the World Games
