= Women's Softball European Championship =

International women's softball competition

- Current season, competition or edition: 2025 Women's Softball European Championship
- Sport: Softball
- Founded: 1979
- No. of teams: 21 (in 2025)
- Continent: Europe
- Most recent champion: Italy (14th title)
- Most titles: Italy (14 titles)

The Women's Softball European Championship (formerly ESF Women's Championship) is the main championship tournament between national women's softball teams in Europe, governed by the European Softball Federation (ESF).

Beginning with 2020, the European championship is held in even years and serves as qualifiers for softball World Cups.

== Results ==
#	Year	Host	Final		Semifinalists		Teams
#	Year	Host	Winner	Runner-up	Third Place	Fourth Place	Teams
1	1979	(Italy); Rovereto	Netherlands	Italy	Belgium	Sweden	6
2	1981	(Netherlands); Haarlem	Netherlands	Italy	Sweden	Belgium	4
3	1983	(Italy); Parma	Netherlands	Italy	Belgium	San Marino	4
4	1984	(Belgium); Antwerp	Netherlands	Italy	Belgium	Sweden	6
5	1986	(Belgium); Antwerp	Italy	Netherlands	Belgium	Denmark	5
6	1988	(Denmark); Hørsholm	Netherlands	Italy	Sweden	Belgium	9
7	1990	(Italy); Genova	Netherlands	Belgium	Italy	Czech Republic	8
8	1992	(Netherlands); Bussum	Italy	Netherlands	Czech Republic	Denmark	11
9	1995	(Italy); Settimo Torinese	Italy	Netherlands	Czech Republic	Belgium	13
10	1997	(Czech Republic); Prague	Italy	Netherlands	Czech Republic	Denmark	8
11	1999	(Belgium); Antwerp	Italy	Czech Republic	Russia	Netherlands	7
12	2001	(Czech Republic); Prague	Italy	Czech Republic	Netherlands	Russia	8
13	2003	(Italy); Saronno	Italy	Russia	Netherlands	Czech Republic	9
14	2005	(Czech Republic); Prague	Italy	Greece	Netherlands	Great Britain	10
15	2007	(Netherlands); Amsterdam	Italy	Netherlands	Russia	Czech Republic	10
16	2009	(Spain); Valencia	Netherlands	Great Britain	Czech Republic	Russia	10
17	2011	(Italy); Ronchi dei Legionari	Netherlands	Italy	Great Britain	Czech Republic	20
18	2013	(Czech Republic); Prague	Netherlands	Italy	Czech Republic	Russia	19
19	2015	(Netherlands); Rosmalen	Italy	Netherlands	Czech Republic	Russia	20
20	2017	(Italy); Bollate	Netherlands	Italy	Great Britain	Czech Republic	23
21	2019	(Czech Republic); Ostrava	Italy	Netherlands	Great Britain	Czech Republic	23
22	2021	(Italy); Friuli-Venezia Giulia	Italy	Netherlands	Czech Republic	Israel	17
23	2022	(Spain); Saint Boi	Netherlands	Great Britain	Italy	Czech Republic	21
24	2024	(Netherlands); Utrecht	Italy	Great Britain	Netherlands	Czech Republic	22
25	2025	(Czech Republic); Prague	Italy	Netherlands	Great Britain	Spain	21
26	2027	(Germany); Stuttgart					

== Medals (1979-2025) ==
Rank	Nation	Gold	Silver	Bronze	Total
1	Italy	14	8	2	24
2	Netherlands	11	9	4	24
3	Great Britain	0	3	4	7
4	Czech Republic	0	2	7	9
5	Belgium	0	1	4	5
6	Russia	0	1	2	3
7	Greece	0	1	0	1
8	Sweden	0	0	2	2
Totals (8 entries)		25	25	25	75

== See also ==
- European Baseball Championship
- European Women's Baseball Championship
- Men's Softball European Championship
- ESF Women's Division B Championship
