= 1974 Women's Softball World Championship =

Tournament details
- Host country: United States
- Teams: 15
- Defending champions: Australia (1970)

Final positions
- Champions: United States (2nd title)
- Runner-up: Japan
- Third place: Australia
- Fourth place: Philippines

The 1974 ISF Women's World Championship for softball was held in August 1974 in the Stratford, Connecticut in the United States.

Rhodesia was barred from the tournament.

The host won the championship.

== Final round ==
Final
United States	3
Japan	0
Bronze medal game
Australia	4
Philippines	0

== Final standings ==
Rank	Team
1st place, gold medalist(s)	United States
2nd place, silver medalist(s)	Japan
3rd place, bronze medalist(s)	Australia
4	Philippines
5	Taiwan
6	Netherlands
7	Canada
8	Italy
9	New Zealand
10	South Africa
11	Bermuda
12	Mexico
13	Puerto Rico
14	U.S. Virgin Islands
15	Venezuela

Source: WBSC
