= 1970 Women's Softball World Championship =

Women's Softball World Championship

Tournament details
- Host country: Japan
- Dates: August 1970
- Teams: 8 (from 4 continents)
- Defending champions: Australia (1965)

Final positions
- Champions: Japan (1st title)
- Runner-up: United States
- Third place: Philippines
- Fourth place: Australia

The 1970 ISF Women's World Championship for softball was held in Osaka, Japan.

South Africa were denied participation.

Japan won 1–0 over the United States in the final.

== Final round ==
Semi-finals
Japan	4
Australia	0
Philippines	1
United States	9

Final
Japan	1
United States	0
Bronze medal game
Philippines	1
Australia	0

== Final standings ==
Rank	Team
1st place, gold medalist(s)	Japan
2nd place, silver medalist(s)	United States
3rd place, bronze medalist(s)	Philippines
4	Australia
Failed to qualify for the Semifinals
5	Mexico
6	Republic of China
7	New Zealand
8	Canada
9	Zambia
