= Miu Goto =

Japanese softball player (born 2001)

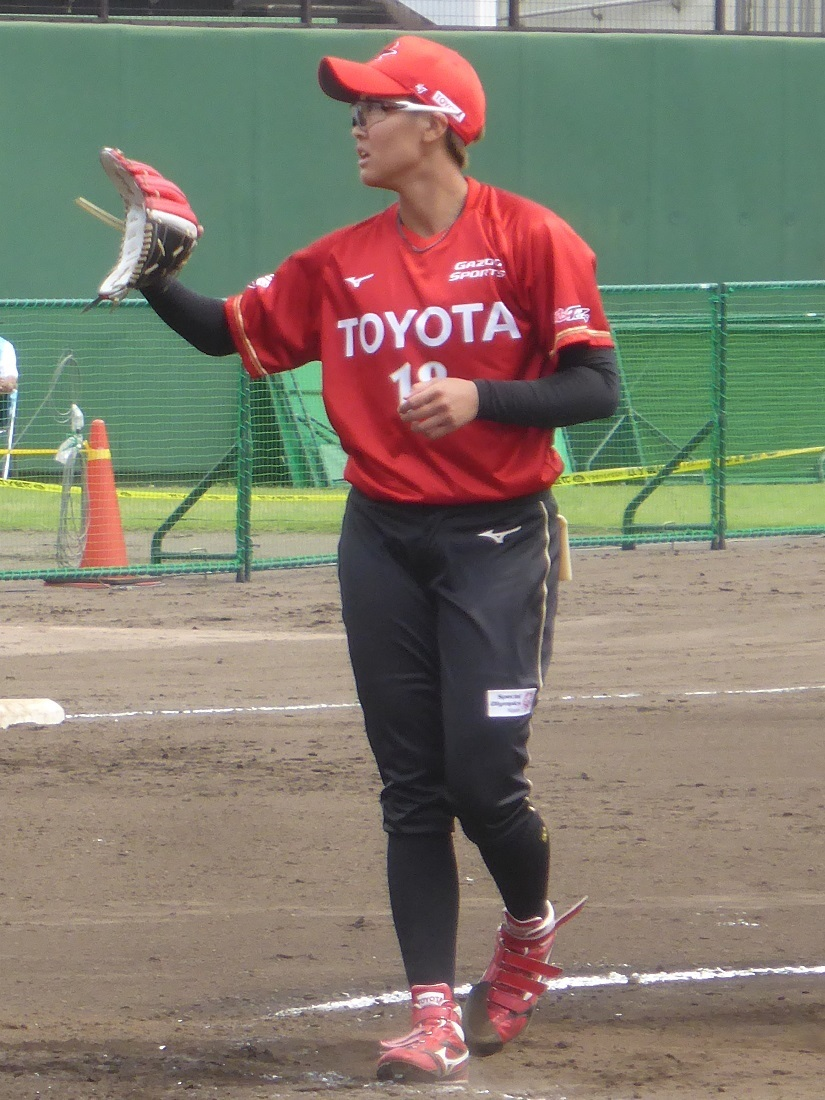
- Goto in 2023

Toyota Red Terriers – No. 27
- Pitcher
- Born: March 2, 2001 (age 25); Nagoya, Japan
- Bats: Left Throws: Left
Medals
Women's softball
Representing Japan
Olympic Games
Gold medal – first place	2020 Tokyo	Team
Women's World Cup
Gold medal – first place	2024 Castions di Strada	Team
World Games
Silver medal – second place	2022 Birmingham	Team
Bronze medal – third place	2025 Chengdu	Team
U19 World Cup
Silver medal – second place	2019 Irvine	Team

Miu Goto (後藤 希友, Gotō Miu; born 2 March 2001) is a Japanese softball left-handed pitcher for the Japan women's national softball team. She represented Japan at the 2020 Summer Olympics and won a gold medal.

== Playing career ==
She participated at the 2019 WBSC U-19 Women's Softball World Cup, winning a silver medal.

She plays for Toyota Red Terriers.
