= Botswana women's national softball team =

Information
- Country: Botswana
- Federation: Botswana Softball Association
- Confederation: WBSC Africa
- WBSC World Rank: 46 ▼4 (31 December 2025)

Women's Softball World Cup
- Appearances: 5 (First in 1994)
- Best result: 14th

Botswana women's national softball team is the national team for Botswana. The team competed at the 1994 ISF Women's World Championship in St. John's, Newfoundland where they finished eighteenth. The team competed at the 2006 ISF Women's World Championship in Beijing, China where they finished fourteenth. The team competed at the 2010 ISF Women's World Championship in Caracas, Venezuela where they finished sixteenth.
