= Aleshia Ocasio =

American softball player (born 1996)

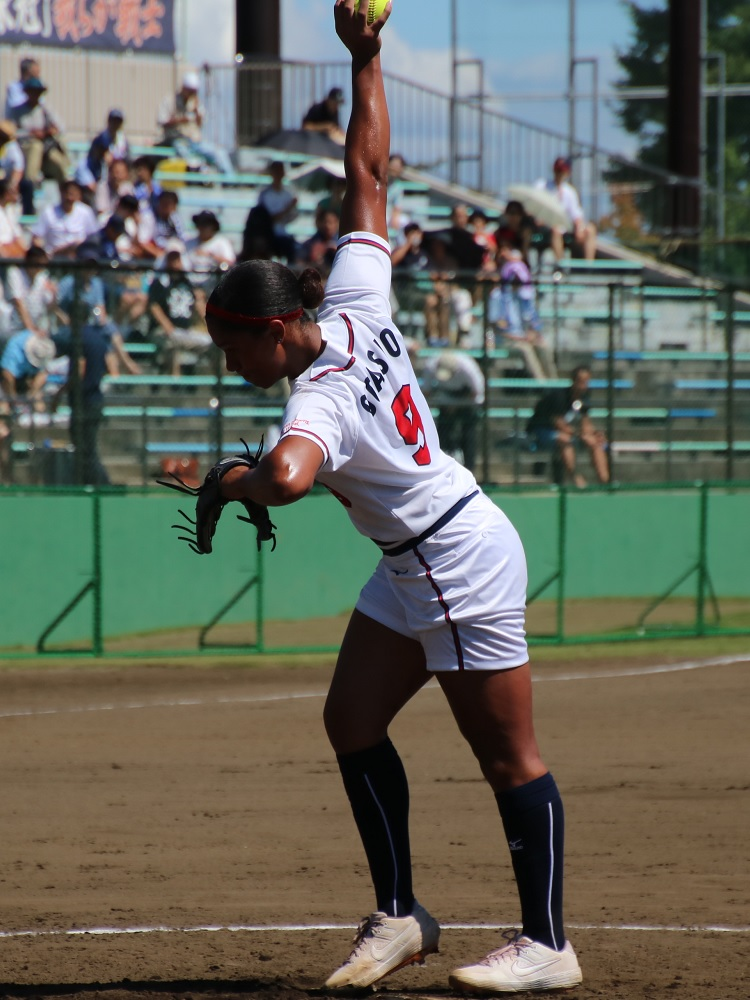
- Ocasio in 2019

Carolina Blaze
- Pitcher / Utility
- Born: August 15, 1996 (age 30); Manhasset, New York, U.S.

Teams
- Florida Gators (2015–2018); Chicago Bandits (2018–2019); USSSA Pride (2019–2020); Athletes Unlimited (2020–2024); Carolina Blaze (2025–present)

Career highlights and awards
- All-SEC Freshman Team (2015); NFCA Third-team All-American (2015); Women's College World Series champion (2015); 3× First Team All-SEC (2016–2018); NFCA First-team All-American (2016); WCWS All-Tournament Team (2017); SEC All-Tournament Team (2018); All-NPF Team (2019)
Medals
Women's softball
Representing Puerto Rico
Pan American Games
Silver medal – second place	2023 Santiago	Team
Bronze medal – third place	2015 Toronto	Team
Bronze medal – third place	2019 Lima	Team
Central American and Caribbean Games
Gold medal – first place	2023 San Salvador	Team
Gold medal – first place	2026 Santo Domingo	Team

Aleshia Ines Ocasio (born August 15, 1996) is an American professional softball player for the Carolina Blaze of the Athletes Unlimited Softball League (AUSL). She played college softball at Florida. Ocasio previously played in the Athletes Unlimited Softball, where she won the 2021 championship as the top individual points leader. She has been a member of the Puerto Rico women's national softball team since 2015.

== Playing career ==
=== College career ===
On April 16, 2014, Ocasio signed her national letter of intent to play college softball at Florida. During her freshman season in 2015 she posted an 18–3 record, with 155 strikeouts, two saves, ten complete games, four shutouts, and a 2.01 ERA in 136 innings. On March 2, 2015, Ocasio was named SEC Freshman of the Week after she posted a 2–0 record with a save during the week. On May 16, 2015, during the Gainesville Regional at the 2015 NCAA Division I softball tournament, she tied the single-game program record for strikeouts in a seven-inning game with 17. She helped the Gators win the 2015 Women's College World Series. Following an outstanding season, she was named to the All-SEC Freshman Team, a NFCA third-team All-American, and a top-25 finalist for the NFCA National Freshman of the Year.

During her sophomore year in 2016, she posted a 20–1 record, with 130 strikeouts, six saves, ten complete games six shutouts, and a 0.77 ERA in 130 2/3 innings. She ranked in the top ten in the conference in opposing batting average, strikeouts, wins and saves, and led the NCAA in ERA. Her 0.77 ERA ranked third best in Florida single-season history. On March 28, 2016, she was named SEC Pitcher of the Week. She earned two wins and one save in 10 shutout innings during the weekend. Following an outstanding season, she was named first-team All-SEC, NFCA first-team All-American and a top-three finalist for the USA Softball Collegiate Player of the Year.

During her junior year in 2017, she posted an 8–2 record, with 55 strikeouts, four complete games, one shutout and a 1.51 ERA in 69.1 innings. Following the season she was named to the All-SEC first-team, and the WCWS All-Tournament team. During her senior year in 2018, she posted a 23–7 record, with 192 strikeouts, two saves, 16 complete games, seven shutouts, and a 1.45 ERA in 164 1/3 innings. She ranked in the top ten in the conference in ERA, opposing batting average, innings pitched, appearances, strikeouts, and wins. She ranked second in the NCAA in strikeout-to-walk ratio at 9.14. On March 30, 2018, Ocasio pitched a combined perfect game with Natalie Lugo, the second combined perfect game in Florida history. On May 20, 2018 during the regional finals of the 2018 NCAA Division I softball tournament, Ocasio pitched the first seven-inning postseason no-hitter in Florida program history. Following the season, she was named to the All-SEC first-team.

She finished her career at Florida ranked first in combined shutouts (25), fourth in strikeouts per seven innings (7.45) and saves (10), fifth in opposing batting average (.192) and games finished (43), and seventh in ERA (1.41), wins (70), and strikeouts (549).

=== Professional career ===
On April 13, 2018, Ocasio was selected tenth overall in the 2018 NPF Draft by the Chicago Bandits of the National Pro Fastpitch league. On June 11, 2018, she signed a three-year contract with the Bandits. During her rookie season in 2018, she posted 17 strikeouts in 22 innings pitched, with a 1.27 ERA. During her second season with the Bandits in 2019 she posted 29 strikeouts, with a 0.89 ERA in 39 1/3 innings. Following the season she was named to the All-NPF team. On February 29, 2020, she announced her retirement from professional softball.

During the second season of the Athletes Unlimited Softball league, Ocasio won the 2021 championship as the top individual points leader with 2,096 points. She led the league with a 6–5 record, and 55 strikeouts in 66 innings pitched, and tied for the lead with 13 appearances. She also threw four complete games and compiled a 2.32 ERA. Her 66 innings pitched surpassed the previous record of 64 innings set by Cat Osterman in 2020.

On January 29, 2025, Ocasio was drafted fifth overall by the Blaze in the inaugural Athletes Unlimited Softball League draft.

== International career ==
Ocasio has been a member of the Puerto Rico women's national softball team since 2015. During the 2015 Pan American Games, she posted a 3–1 record in five games, and batted .375 (6-for-16) with five RBI and four runs scored, to help lead Puerto Rico to a bronze medal. She again won a bronze medal at 2019 Pan American Games.

She represented Puerto Rico at the 2022 World Games. During the classification stage in a game against Canada, she hit a double to right field in the first inning for the only run of the game. She also pitched a two-hit shutout to lead Puerto Rico to a 1–0 win over Canada and clinch the fifth place at the World Games.

She represented Puerto Rico at the 2023 Central American and Caribbean Games. During the championship game she pitched a complete-game shutout in a 2–0 win over Cuba and won a gold medal.

== Personal life ==
Ocasio is openly lesbian and was married to professional basketball player Natasha Cloud. They separated in 2022.
