= Puerto Rico women's national softball team =

Information
- Country: Puerto Rico
- Confederation: WBSC Americas
- WBSC World Rank: 3 (31 December 2025)

Olympic Games
- Appearances: 1 (First in 1996)
- Best result: 8th

Women's Softball World Cup
- Appearances: 11 (First in 1974)
- Best result: 5th

Puerto Rico women's national softball team is the national team for Puerto Rico. The team competed at the 1986 ISF Women's World Championship in Auckland, New Zealand, where they finished fifth. The team competed at the 1990 ISF Women's World Championship in Normal, Illinois, where they finished with 5 wins and 4 losses. The team competed at the 1994 ISF Women's World Championship in St. John's, Newfoundland, where they finished ninth. The team competed at the 2002 ISF Women's World Championship in Saskatoon, Saskatchewan, where they finished eighth. At the 2018 World Championship, they placed 2nd in Group A with a record 6-1 before losing their next two games vs Japan and Canada finishing 5th overall.

Puerto Rico women's national softball team
Medal record

Softball

World Cup of Softball
Bronze medal – third place	2014 Irvine	

Pan American Games
Silver medal – second place	1979 San Juan	
Silver medal – second place	1987 Indianapolis	
Silver medal – second place	1995 Mar del Plata	
Silver medal – second place	2023 Santiago	
Bronze medal – third place	2015 Toronto	

Central American and Caribbean Games
Gold medal – first place	2018 Barranquilla	
Gold medal – first place	2023 San Salvador	
Gold medal – first place	2026 Santo Domingo	

== All-Time Results ==
=== Summary ===
Year	W	L	Pct
2004	0	0	.000
2005	0	0	.000
2006	0	0	.000
2007	0	0	.000
2008	0	0	.000
2009	0	0	.000
2010	0	0	.000
2011	0	0	.000
2012	0	0	.000
2013	0	0	.000
2014	0	0	.000
Totals	0	0	.000

=== 1986 ===
Date	Event	Location	Winner	Score	Loser	Yearly Record
Jan 18, 1986	World Championship	Auckland, New Zealand	United States	2-0	Puerto Rico	0-1
Jan 19, 1986	World Championship	Auckland, New Zealand	Puerto Rico	0-0	Puerto Rico	0-0
Jan 19, 1986	World Championship	Auckland, New Zealand	Puerto Rico	0-0	Puerto Rico	0-0
Jan 20, 1986	World Championship	Auckland, New Zealand	Puerto Rico	0-0	Puerto Rico	0-0
Jan 21, 1986	World Championship	Auckland, New Zealand	Puerto Rico	0-0	Puerto Rico	0-0
Jan 22, 1986	World Championship	Auckland, New Zealand	Puerto Rico	0-0	Puerto Rico	0-0
Jan 22, 1986	World Championship	Auckland, New Zealand	Puerto Rico	0-0	Puerto Rico	0-0
Jan 23, 1986	World Championship	Auckland, New Zealand	Puerto Rico	0-0	Puerto Rico	0-0
Jan 24, 1986	World Championship	Auckland, New Zealand	Puerto Rico	0-0	Puerto Rico	0-0
Jan 25, 1986	World Championship	Auckland, New Zealand	Puerto Rico	0-0	Puerto Rico	0-0
Jan 25, 1986	World Championship	Auckland, New Zealand	Puerto Rico	0-0	Puerto Rico	0-0
Jan 26, 1986	World Championship	Auckland, New Zealand	Puerto Rico	0-0	Puerto Rico	0-0
Jan 26, 1986	World Championship	Auckland, New Zealand	Puerto Rico	0-0	Puerto Rico	0-0

=== 2018 ===
Date	Event	Location	Winner	Score	Loser	Yearly Record
July 20, 2018	Central American and Caribbean Games	Barranquilla, Colombia	Puerto Rico	10-1	Cuba	1-0
July 21, 2018	Central American and Caribbean Games	Barranquilla, Colombia	Puerto Rico	6-4	Venezuela	2-0
July 22, 2018	Central American and Caribbean Games	Barranquilla, Colombia	Puerto Rico	10-1	Colombia	3-0
July 23, 2018	Central American and Caribbean Games	Barranquilla, Colombia	Puerto Rico	2-0	Dominican Republic	4-0
July 24, 2018	Central American and Caribbean Games	Barranquilla, Colombia	Mexico	2-1	Puerto Rico	4-1
July 25, 2018	Central American and Caribbean Games	Barranquilla, Colombia	Mexico	5-1	Puerto Rico	4-2
July 26, 2018	Central American and Caribbean Games	Barranquilla, Colombia	Puerto Rico	4-0	Cuba	5-2
July 26, 2018	CACG Gold Medal Game	Barranquilla, Colombia	Puerto Rico	4-2	Mexico	6-2
