= Italy women's national softball team =

Information
- Country: Italy
- Federation: Federazione Italiana Baseball Softball
- Confederation: WBSC Europe
- WBSC World Rank: 7 (31 December 2024)

Olympic Games
- Appearances: 3 (First in 2000)
- Best result: 5th

Women's Softball World Cup
- Appearances: 13 (First in 1974)
- Best result: 6th

Italy women's national softball team
Medal record

Representing Italy

European Championship
Gold medal – first place	1986 Antwerp	
Gold medal – first place	1992 Bussum	
Gold medal – first place	1995 Settimo Torinese	
Gold medal – first place	1997 Prague	
Gold medal – first place	1999 Antwerp	
Gold medal – first place	2001 Prague	
Gold medal – first place	2003 Saronno	
Gold medal – first place	2005 Prague	
Gold medal – first place	2007 Amsterdam	
Gold medal – first place	2015 Rosmalen	
Gold medal – first place	2019 Ostrava	
Gold medal – first place	2021 Friuli Venezia Giulia	
Gold medal – first place	2024 Utrecht	
Gold medal – first place	2025 Prague	
Silver medal – second place	1979 Rovereto	
Silver medal – second place	1981 Haarlem	
Silver medal – second place	1983 Parma	
Silver medal – second place	1984 Antwerp	
Silver medal – second place	1988 Hørsholm	
Silver medal – second place	2011 Ronchi dei Legionari	
Silver medal – second place	2013 Prague	
Silver medal – second place	2017 Bollate	
Bronze medal – third place	1990 Genoa	
Bronze medal – third place	2022 Sant Boi	

Italy women's national softball team is one of the top-ranked softball teams in Europe.

The Italian team has won the Women's Softball European Championship a record fourteen times. Their latest European title came in 2025. In 2019, the Italian team won the WBSC Olympic Softball Qualifier by beating all five opponents and eventually qualified for the Olympic tournament in Tokyo.

== History ==
The first participation in the World Championships took place in 1974, where Italy finished in 7th place. The team competed at the 1990 ISF Women's World Championship in Normal, Illinois where they finished with 6 wins and 3 losses. The team competed at the 1994 ISF Women's World Championship in St. John's, Newfoundland where they finished eleventh. The team competed at the 1998 ISF Women's World Championship in Fujinomiya City, Japan where they finished sixth.

The team competed at the 2002 ISF Women's World Championship in Saskatoon, Saskatchewan where they finished seventh. The team competed at the 2006 ISF Women's World Championship in Beijing, China where they finished sixth. After finishing out of the top 8 in the three following World Championship editions, Italy came back in 2018, in Chiba, and took seventh place thanks to a four-game winning streak that eliminated, among others, China from the medal contention. In the fight for sixth place, Italy was beaten by Mexico in a tight 1–0 loss after two extra-innings.

The team's slogan (also the official hashtag) is the Latin aphorism "hic et nunc" (here and now). Here and now, sisters! (Qui e ora, sorelle!) is the official history book of the Italy women's national softball team, written by Luca Farinotti and published by Italia sul podio and Federazione Italiana Baseball Softball. It was the first italian sports book in which the technical lexicon has been completely reinvented according to the female gender. The book was presented before the 2020 Summer Olympics.

== Palmarès ==
Competition	1st place, gold medalist(s)	2nd place, silver medalist(s)	3rd place, bronze medalist(s)	Total
Olympic Games	0	0	0	0
World Championship	0	0	0	0
European Championship	14	8	2	24
Universiade	0	0	0	0
Total	14	8	2	24

== Current roster ==
Italy roster – 2024 Women's Softball European Championship
Players		Coaches
Pitchers: 6 Laura Bigatton; 7 Ilaria Cacciamani; 5 Alexia Lacatena; 16 Alice Nicolini; 24 Christina Toniolo	Catchers: 15 Elisa Cecchetti; 19 Marta Gasparotto; 20 Erika Piancastelli; Infielders: 32 Barbara McKenzie; 8 Andrea Filler; 14 Giulia Longhi; 3 Alessandra Rotondo; 23 Melany Sheldon; 26 Silvia Torre; Outfielders: 1 Isabella Dayton; 18 Felicia di Pancrazio; 27 Giulia Koutsoyanopulos	Manager: Federico Pizzolini; Coaches: Giulio Brusa (coach); Nancy Evans (pitching); Maristella Perizzolo (coach); Roster

== See also ==
- Women's Softball European Championship
- Softball at the 2000 Summer Olympics
- Softball at the 2004 Summer Olympics
