= Baseball in Norway =

Overview of baseball as played in Norway

Baseball is a minor but steadily growing team sport in Norway, organized nationally by the Norwegian Softball and Baseball Federation (Norwegian: Norges Softball og Baseball Forbund; NSBF), founded in 1991. The sport is played at club level through a domestic league system centered on Oslo, with additional clubs in Bergen, Trondheim, Kristiansand, Stavanger, Drammen, and Mjøndalen, and is represented internationally by the Norway national baseball team, which competes in the European Baseball Championship and the annual Nordic Baseball Championship against Sweden, Denmark, and Finland.

As of the mid-2020s, an estimated 600 people in Norway were involved in the sport as players or federation members.

== History ==
=== Origins ===
Organized baseball in Norway traces to the late 1980s, when a group of enthusiasts founded the country's first baseball clubs. Multiple sources describe the sport's earliest Norwegian clubs as founded jointly by American expatriates living in the country and by Norwegians who had encountered the game abroad.

The Norwegian Softball and Baseball Federation was established in 1991 to organize the growing sport nationally, at which point domestic leagues began to take shape and baseball spread gradually across the country. That same year, Oslo Pretenders — which would become the sport's most decorated Norwegian club — was founded, reportedly emerging from a group of friends who had previously played slow-pitch softball together in Frogner Park in Oslo.

=== Domestic growth and European competition ===
Oslo Pretenders won the first Norwegian Championship (NM) as an unheralded newcomer, and by 2000 had established itself as the country's dominant club, defeating the previously powerful Oslo Ballkam in that year's NM final — a result credited with reinvigorating the club and sparking a more structured recruitment effort. Beginning in 2001, Pretenders expanded to field a reserve ("P2") team and made their first appearance in the European Cup Qualifier, held in Antwerp, Belgium, marking Norwegian baseball's entry into continental club competition. The club went on to compete in the European Cup every year from 2001 to 2010, ultimately winning 21 National Championships and 18 league titles.

=== Rise of the national team ===
Norway's senior national team made its first major international appearance at the 2016 European Baseball Championship C-Pool, described by the federation as a breakthrough that put the country's baseball community on the international map. The team subsequently began competing annually in Nordic regional competition, defeating Finland 8–7 at the 2023 Nordic Baseball Tournament.

2024 marked a breakthrough season: Norway qualified for the European Championship B-Pool for the first time, held in Ireland, where the team opened with a 14–3 win over Bulgaria — its first-ever B-Pool victory — before finishing the tournament 1–2 after losses to Austria and host Ireland. That same year, Norway went winless (0–3) at the Nordic Cup against Denmark, Finland, and Sweden.

In 2025, Norway posted a 2–2 record at the Nordic Baseball Championship, shutting out Finland 12–0 and coming from behind to beat Sweden 10–9 in the tournament finale after opening with two losses to the Swedes. In 2026, Norway returned to the European Championship B-Pool in Wrocław, Poland, finishing 1–4 with a 10–8 win over Lithuania; the tournament was noted by the federation as the international farewell for pitcher Emil Fjellvang, described as the best Norwegian-born pitcher in the program's history. Slovakia won the 2026 B-Pool and was promoted to the A-Pool.

As of 26 March 2026, Norway held a WBSC world ranking of 68th.

== Governing body ==
The Norwegian Softball and Baseball Federation, headquartered in Oslo, governs both baseball and softball nationally. It is a member of the Norwegian Olympic and Paralympic Committee and Confederation of Sports, the Confederation of European Baseball, and the European Softball Federation, and is affiliated with the World Baseball Softball Confederation (WBSC). In addition to running the men's and women's national teams, the federation organizes Norway's domestic league structure, referred to as the Norsk Baseballiga, across first and second divisions.

The men's national team program operates under the branded identity "Baseball Norge" (Baseball Norway), which the federation describes as open to participants aged 13 and up, alongside dedicated under-15 and under-18 national youth teams.

== Domestic competition ==
Norwegian club baseball is organized into tiers:

- Eliteserien — the top division, contested each summer for the national championship. Most Eliteserien clubs are based in Oslo, with additional representation from Bergen, Trondheim, and Kristiansand; the division supplies the majority of players to the senior national team. As of the mid-2020s, clubs competing at this level include Vålerenga Baseball, Oslo Pretenders, Trondheim Hellhounds, Bergen Wet Sox, Kristiansand Suns, and ØHIL Royals.
- National Series (Norgesserien) — a second-tier, mixed-skill division intended for developing players, those returning to the sport, and recreational players, serving as a natural progression from youth and Little League baseball. Participating clubs have included Vålerenga Baseball, Oslo Pretenders, ØHIL Royals, and Drammen Loggers.
- Little League and youth baseball — youth programs that form the developmental pipeline feeding the Eliteserien and national teams, run through clubs including Vålerenga Baseball, Trondheim Hellhounds, Kristiansand Suns, ØHIL Royals, Sola Baseball (Stavanger), and Mjøndalen Brown Sox. Youth players in Norway often begin in slåball, a participation-focused Norwegian children's variant in which every player bats each inning, scorekeeping is not kept, and players rotate through all fielding positions, before progressing into Little League age divisions (under-13, 13–19, and adult 19+).

Dedicated baseball academies have also operated in Oslo, Stavanger, and Trondheim.

== Venues ==
Baseball fields exist in several Norwegian cities. Oslo is home to the country's oldest baseball venue, Rommen Baseball Park in the north end of the city, as well as Rud Baseball bane in the neighboring municipality of Bærum. Trondheim's baseball facility has been noted for having a full turf playing surface.

== Notable players ==
Norwegian players who have pursued baseball at the collegiate or professional level abroad include:

- Emil Fjellvang — pitcher for the Norway national team, described by the federation as the best Norwegian-born pitcher in the program's history; his final national-team appearance came at the 2026 European Championship B-Pool.
- Stefan Torgersen — a graduate of Dartmouth College who has played on Norway's national program.
- Aidan Brødjsø — has played collegiately at Santa Rosa Junior College in California.
- Lars Liguori — has pitched for Nettuno of Italy's top league after stints in United States independent league baseball.
- Mads Eldevik — a youth product who, as a teenager, attended and played for the Regensburg Baseball Academy in Germany.

== See also ==
- Norway national baseball team
- Norwegian Softball and Baseball Federation
- Oslo Pretenders
- Norway women's national softball team
- Baseball in Europe
- Confederation of European Baseball
