= WBSC Europe =

World Baseball Softball Confederation Europe

- The logo of World Baseball Softball Confederation Europe
- Category: Sport governing body
- Jurisdiction: Europe
- Membership: 41
- Abbreviation: WBSC Europe
- Affiliation: World Baseball Softball Confederation
- Headquarters: Lausanne, Switzerland
- President: Krunoslav Karin

Official website
- www.wbsceurope.org/en

WBSC Europe is the governing body of the sport of baseball and softball in Europe. It was established on February 10, 2018, during a Congress of the Confederation of European Baseball and the European Softball Federation in Val d’Europe, France. The establishment of WBSC Europe followed the historic merger of the Confederation of European Baseball (CEB) and the European Softball Federation (ESF). As of 2026, WBSC Europe has 40 members for baseball and 39 for softball.

The CEB was founded in 1953 with 5 members, which were Belgium, France, West Germany, Italy and Spain.

The CEB was responsible for operating the European Baseball Championship, a championship that has been running since 1954 in Europe. In 2010, there were 112,303 players in the CEB countries.

The ESF was founded in 1976 with 6 members, which were Belgium, France, Italy, Germany, Netherlands, and Spain.

The ESF was responsible for operating the European Softball Championships.

== History ==
The Confederation of European Baseball was formed in 1953. The European Softball Federation was formed in 1976, which then merged (baseball and softball) and formed into WBSC Europe in 2018.

=== CEB ===
In April 1953 in Paris, France, 5 countries (Belgium, France, Germany, Italy and Spain) gave birth to the European Baseball Federation, originally named in French Féderation Européenne de Baseball (FEB). The first Executive Committee was formed by President Steno Borghese of Italy, Secretary General Roger Panaye of Belgium and Vice President and head of the Technical Commission Luis Barrio of Spain.

In 1954 the first European Championship was played in Belgium and Italy claimed the victory.

The sixth member country, the Netherlands, was accepted at the 1956 Congress in Milan.

In 1957 in Amsterdam, Netherlands, Sweden became the seventh member, and FEB became an eight-country federation in London in 1960 when Great Britain was accepted.

In 1963 FEB launched their first club competition. The first European champion of the club competition was Picadero Barcelona.

In 1967 the federations of Italy and the Netherlands announced their withdrawal from FEB and founded a new Federation: Fédération Amateur Baseball. In April 1969 the two Federations re-entered FEB.

In 1971 another Italian, Bruno Beneck, succeeded Steno Borghese during the Congress held in Milan. San Marino was accepted as the ninth member.

In 1972 the organization changed its name to European Amateur Baseball Confederation or CEBA, according to the French Confederation Européenne de Baseball Amateur.

In 1974 the first U-18 European Championship for players of age 18 and under was played. The first title went to the Netherlands. The Dutch also claimed the first U-16 title in 1975. In 1979, during the Congress in Trieste, Italy, Denmark was accepted as the 10th member.

There were already 15 member countries when, in 1985, during the Congress in Zandvoort, Netherlands, Guus Van der Heiden of the Netherlands succeeded Bruno Beneck as the president.

When Van der Heiden died, Italian Federation President Aldo Notari was elected as the 4th president of the organization during the 1987 Congress in Barcelona.

During the 1990s the number of member countries increased dramatically up to 33 by 1994, at which time it was decided to drop the word Amateur from the name of the Confederation, known since then as CEB: Confederation Européenne du Baseball in French and Confederation of European Baseball in English. CEB also created the Cup Winners Cup in 1990 and the CEB Cup in 1993.

Martin Miller of Germany, who had been part of the executive since 1995, succeeded Aldo Notari (who was nominated Honorary President) in 2005, during the Congress in Prague. Miller was confirmed as president during the 2009 Congress in San Marino. During Miller's presidency, the number of European Cups for Clubs was reduced to two. Starting in the 2009 season, only a single European Cup for Clubs is played.

Miller resigned from the presidency during the 2012 Congress in Rotterdam. Petr Ditrich of the Czech Republic was the interim president until the 2013 Congress in Bled, Slovenia, that elected Jan Esselman of the Netherlands as the new president.

=== ESF ===
In 1976 in Rome, Italy, 6 countries (Belgium, France, Germany, Italy, Netherlands and Spain) gave birth to the European Softball Federation (ESF). The first Executive Committee was formed by President Bruno Benek of Italy and Secretary General Theo Vleeshhouwer of Netherlands.

=== WBSC Europe History ===
On February 14, 2018, in Paris, France, the delegates of 38 National Baseball and Softball Federations approved the merger of the Confederation of European Baseball (CEB) and the European Softball Federation (ESF) at the joint European Baseball Softball Congress in Paris, France.

In reaction to the 2022 Russian invasion of Ukraine, WBSC Europe relocated competitions that had been scheduled to be held in Russia during 2022, and excluded Russian and Belarusian teams from all its 2022 competitions.

WBSC had a budget of €500,000 in 2024.

== WBSC World Rankings ==
=== Baseball ===
WBSC Men's Rankings (as of 18 November 2026)
Europe*	WBSC	+/-	National Team	Points
1	11	Steady	Netherlands	2173
2	13	Steady	Italy	1897
3	16	Steady	Czech Republic	1427
4	17	▲3	Great Britain	1118
5	18	▼1	Germany	1049
6	21	▲1	Israel	692
7	23	Steady	Spain	506
8	26	Steady	France	281
9	27	Steady	Austria	266
10	29	▼1	Belgium	235
11	33	Steady	Croatia	189
12	36	Steady	Sweden	154
13	37	▲1	Switzerland	132
14	45	Steady	Slovakia	82
15	47	Steady	Greece	80
16	50	Steady	Hungary	68
17	51	Steady	Lithuania	62
18	54	Steady	Poland	51
19	64	Steady	Bulgaria	25
20	68	Steady	Slovenia	20
21	69	Steady	Ireland	19
22	73	Steady	Norway	15
23	74	Steady	Serbia	14
23	74	Steady	Ukraine	14
25	77	Steady	Romania	9
26	80	Steady	Finland	6
27	81	Steady	Finland	5
*Local rankings based on WBSC ranking points

WBSC Women's Rankings (as of 9 September 2026)
Europe*	WBSC	+/-	National Team	Points
1	15	Steady	Great Britain	260
2	19	▼5	France	164
3	22	▼4	Czech Republic	118
4	27	Steady	Netherlands	16
*Local rankings based on WBSC ranking points

=== Softball ===
WBSC Men's Softball Rankings (as of 14 May 2026)
Europe*	WBSC	+/-	National Team	Points
1	9	Steady	Czech Republic	1466
2	14	▲5	Denmark	486
3	20	Steady	Netherlands	239
4	22	▼6	Israel	198
5	23	Steady	Belgium	195
6	24	▲1	Great Britain	152
7	29	Steady	Croatia	74
8	34	▼1	Slovakia	41
9	37	▼1	Sweden	18
*Local rankings based on WBSC ranking points

WBSC Women's Rankings (as of 21 October 2026)
Europe*	WBSC	+/-	National Team	Points
1	7	Steady	Netherlands	1915
2	9	Steady	Czech Republic	1666
3	10	Steady	Italy	1556
4	13	Steady	Great Britain	967
5	18	Steady	Spain	659
6	20	Steady	Israel	473
7	21	Steady	France	469
8	22	Steady	Germany	466
9	23	▲1	Austria	394
10	24	▲1	Ukraine	394
11	29	▼1	Greece	298
12	30	▼1	Poland	292
13	34	▼1	Belgium	276
14	36	Steady	Switzerland	253
15	37	Steady	Croatia	192
16	38	Steady	Sweden	186
17	40	Steady	Denmark	185
18	42	Steady	Ireland	133
19	45	Steady	Finland	118
20	47	Steady	Slovakia	95
21	48	Steady	Turkey	90
22	50	Steady	Lithuania	73
23	58	Steady	Hungary	16
*Local rankings based on WBSC ranking points

=== Baseball5 ===
WBSC Baseball5 Rankings (as of 22 September 2026)
Europe*	WBSC	+/-	National Team	Points
1	3	Steady	France	4663
2	8	Steady	Turkey	3130
3	9	Steady	Lithuania	2879
4	11	Steady	Spain	2147
5	14	Steady	Italy	1493
6	17	▲1	Romania	1144
7	18	▼1	Netherlands	1130
8	22	▲1	Belgium	911
9	24	Steady	Denmark	894
10	26	Steady	Bulgaria	873
11	32	Steady	Moldova	504
12	34	Steady	Russia	500
13	38	Steady	Germany	488
14	40	Steady	Ukraine	418
15	44	Steady	Croatia	346
16	45	Steady	Greece	319
17	49	Steady	Estonia	276
18	52	▼1	Slovakia	250
18	52	▼1	Hungary	250
19	52	▼1	Serbia	250
21	62	Steady	Poland	220
22	63	Steady	Finland	163
23	70	Steady	Kosovo	30
24	78	Steady	Israel	0
*Local rankings based on WBSC ranking points

=== Historical leaders ===
Highest Ranked Europe member in the WBSC Rankings

Men's baseball

Women's baseball

Men's softball

Women's softball

== Championships ==
=== Baseball ===
Men's

- Baseball European Championship
- U-23 Baseball European Championship
- U-18 Baseball European Championship
- U-15 Baseball European Championship
- U-12 Baseball European Championship

Women's

- Women's Baseball European Championship

Club

- Baseball European Champions Cup
- Baseball European Cup
- Baseball European Federation Cup

Defunct

- European Champion Cup Final Four
- European Under-21 Baseball Championship
- Super 6 Baseball and Softball

=== Softball ===
Men's

- Men's Softball European Championship
- U-23 Men's Softball European Championship
- U-18 Men's Softball European Championship
- U-16 Men's Softball European Championship
- Men's Slowpitch European Championship

Women's

- Women's Softball European Championship
- U-22 Women's Softball European Championship
- U-18 Women's Softball European Championship
- U-15 Women's Softball European Championship

Coed

- Coed Slowpitch European Championship

Club

- Men’s Softball European Super Cup
- Women’s Softball European Cup
- Coed Slowpitch European Cup

Defunct

- ESF Women's Division B Championship
- U-13 Women's Softball European Championship

=== Baseball5 ===
- Baseball5 European Championship
- Youth Baseball5 European Championship

=== Current title holders ===
Competition	Year	Host country	Champions	Title	Runners-up	Next edition	Dates
Baseball
Baseball European Championship	2025	Netherlands, Belgium, Italy	Netherlands	25th	Italy	2027	4-12 September
U-23 Baseball European Championship	2025	Czech Republic	Great Britain	1st	Czech Republic	2027	2-7 August
U-18 Baseball European Championship	2026	Italy	Italy	16th	Germany	2028	
U-15 Baseball European Championship	2025	Italy	Germany	4th	Czech Republic	2027	19-24 July
U-12 Baseball European Championship	2026	France	Germany	5th	Czech Republic	2027	2-7 August
Women's Baseball European Championship	2025	Czech Republic	Great Britain	1st	Czech Republic	2027	11-14 August
Softball
Men's Softball European Championship	2025	Czech Republic	Czech Republic	13th	Denmark	2027	12-17 July
U-23 Men's Softball European Championship	2025	Czech Republic	Czech Republic	2nd	Denmark	2027	23-28 August
U-18 Men's Softball European Championship	2026	Czech Republic	Czech Republic	11th	Lithuania	2028	
U-16 Men's Softball European Championship	2026	Czech Republic	Czech Republic	4th	Croatia	2028	
Women's Softball European Championship	2025	Czech Republic	Italy	14th	Netherlands	2027	25-31 July
U-22 Women's Softball European Championship	2026	Czech Republic, Poland	Italy	4th	Czech Republic	2028	
U-18 Women's Softball European Championship	2025	Czech Republic	Czech Republic	4th	Italy	2027	5-10 July
U-15 Women's Softball European Championship	2026	Netherlands	Italy	3rd	Czech Republic	2028	
Men's Slowpitch European Championship	2026	Belgium	Netherlands	1st	Great Britain	2028	
Coed Slowpitch European Championship	2026	Czech Republic	Great Britain	14th	Germany	2028	
Baseball5
Baseball5 European Championship	2025	Lithuania	France	2nd	Spain	2027	
Youth Baseball5 European Championship	2026	Italy	Turkey	1st	France	2028	
Club
Baseball Confederation Cup	2026	Croatia	(Czech Republic) Hroši Brno	1st	(Belgium) Brasschaat Braves	2027	21-26 June
Baseball European Cup	2026	Austria	(Slovenia) Kranjski Lisjaki	1st	(Sweden) Rättviks BSK	2027	14-19 June
Baseball European Federation Cup	2026	Slovakia	(Norway) Vålerenga Baseball	1st	(Poland) Stal Kutno	2027	7-12 June
Baseball European Federation Cup	2026	Lithuania	(Slovakia) Apollo Bratislava	1st	(Switzerland) Barracudas Zürich	2027	7-12 June
Men’s Softball European Super Cup	2026	Czech Republic	(Czech Republic) Locos Břeclav		(Denmark) Hørsholm Hurricanes	2027	
Women’s Softball European Cup	2026	Switzerland	(Italy) Softball Forli` A.S.D.		(Italy) Bollate Softball 1969	2027	16-21 August
Women’s Softball European Cup	2026	Switzerland	(Switzerland) Wittenbach Panthers		(Ukraine) SC KYIV	2027	16-21 August
Coed Slowpitch European Cup	2025	Germany	(Germany) UCE Travellers		(United Kingdom) Pioneers	2027	
Baseball5 European Cup	2026	Lithuania	(Lithuania) Beisbolo Akademija	1st	(Turkey) EGO SK	2027	

== Medals ==
As of 6 August 2023

=== National Events ===
1. Men's European Baseball Championship (1954–2025) - 38 Editions
2. Women's European Baseball Championship (2019–2025) - 3 Editions
3. Men's Softball European Championship (1993–2023) - 16 Editions
4. Women's Softball European Championship (1979–2022) - 23 Editions
5. European Under-23 Baseball Championship (2017–2021) - 3 Editions
6. European Under-21 Baseball Championship (2006–2016) - 6 Editions
7. European Under-18 Baseball Championship (1974–2022) - 32 Editions
8. European Under-15 Baseball Championship (1975–2023) - 31 Editions
9. European Under-12 Baseball Championship (1992–2023) - 30 Editions
10. Baseball5 European Championship (2020) - 1 Editions
11. ESF Junior Boys Championship (U-18) (1998–2015) - 9 Editions
12. ESF Junior Girls Championship (U-18) (1991–2023) - 17 Editions
13. ESF Co-Ed Slowpitch European Championships (1998–2022) - 13 Editions
14. U-22 Women's Softball European Championship (2008–2020) - 7 Editions
15. U-15 Women's Softball European Championship (2002–2022) - 11 Editions
16. U-13 Women's Softball European Championship (2002–2010) - 5 Editions
17. U-23 Men's Softball European Championship (2022) - 1 Editions
18. U-16 Men's Softball European Championship (2017–2021) - 2 Editions
19. U17 Baseball5 European Championship (2022) - 1 Editions
20. Men's Slowpitch European Championship (2018–2022) - 2 Editions
21. Super 6 Baseball and Softball (2018) - 1 Editions + 1 Editions

Rank	Nation	Gold	Silver	Bronze	Total
1	Netherlands	85	47	25	157
2	Italy	70	56	20	146
3	Czech Republic	47	47	39	133
4	Great Britain	15	5	11	31
5	Russia	12	26	23	61
6	Germany	7	8	21	36
7	France	6	7	10	23
8	Denmark	3	17	4	24
9	Spain	3	9	34	46
10	Belgium	1	5	17	23
11	Ukraine	1	2	5	8
12	Ireland	0	4	9	13
13	Israel	0	3	5	8
14	Moldova	0	3	0	3
15	Lithuania	0	2	5	7
16	Greece	0	2	1	3
16	Slovenia	0	2	1	3
18	Poland	0	1	6	7
19	Austria	0	1	2	3
20	Romania	0	1	1	2
21	Serbia	0	1	0	1
21	Turkey	0	1	0	1
23	Sweden	0	0	6	6
24	Croatia	0	0	4	4
25	Bulgaria	0	0	1	1
25	Estonia	0	0	1	1
25	Slovakia	0	0	1	1
Totals (27 entries)		250	250	252	752

- 3 Bronze awarded in 1989 U-18 European Baseball Championship.
- Czech Republic Consist of Czechoslovakia.

=== Club Events ===
1. European Champions Cup (1963–2023) - 59 Editions
2. European Confederation Cup (1993–2023) - 23 Editions
3. European Federation Cup (2016–2023) - 7 Editions
4. European Champion Cup Final Four (2008–2012) - 5 Editions
5. ESF men's EC club championships (1990–2022) - 32 Editions
6. ESF men's CWC club championships (2002–2011) - 10 Editions
7. ESF Co-Ed Slowpitch European Super Cup (2007–2021) - 10 Editions
8. Men’s Softball European Super Cup (-) - Editions - Not Counted in this Table
9. Women’s Softball European Cup (-) - Editions - Not Counted in this Table
10. ESF women's EC club championships (-) - Editions - Not Counted in this Table
11. ESF women's CWC club championships (-) - Editions - Not Counted in this Table
12. Coed Slowpitch European Cup (-) - Editions - Not Counted in this Table

Rank	Nation	Gold	Silver	Bronze	Total
1	Italy	50	40	26	116
2	Netherlands	33	29	35	97
3	Czech Republic	14	16	16	46
4	Denmark	12	11	8	31
5	Spain	10	8	16	34
6	Great Britain	7	6	5	18
7	San Marino	4	3	3	10
8	Germany	3	9	8	20
9	Belgium	3	7	13	23
10	Croatia	3	1	1	5
11	France	2	6	10	18
12	Austria	2	1	4	7
13	Ireland	1	4	1	6
14	Norway	1	1	0	2
15	Slovenia	1	0	0	1
16	Sweden	0	3	0	3
17	Russia	0	1	1	2
18	Hungary	0	0	1	1
18	Ukraine	0	0	1	1
Totals (19 entries)		146	146	149	441

- 2 Bronze awarded in 2013, 2014 and 2015 European Champions Cup.

==== 2023 ====
Coed Slowpitch European Super Cup 2023 07/08/2023 12/08/2023

August European Softball Massimo Romeo Youth Trophy - Sport Division 2023 European Softball Massimo Romeo Youth Trophy - Sport Division 2023 16/08/2023 19/08/2023

August European Softball Massimo Romeo Youth Trophy - Future Division 2023 European Softball Massimo Romeo Youth Trophy - Future Division 2023 16/08/2023 19/08/2023

August Women’s Softball European Premier Cup 2023 Women’s Softball European Premier Cup 2023 21/08/2023 26/08/2023

August Women’s Softball European Cup Winners Cup “A” 2023 Women’s Softball European Cup Winners Cup “A” 2023 21/08/2023 26/08/2023

August Women’s Softball European Cup Winners Cup “B” 2023 Women’s Softball European Cup Winners Cup “B” 2023 21/08/2023 26/08/2023

August Women’s Softball European Cup 2023 Women’s Softball European Cup 2023 23/08/2023 26/08/2023

August Men’s Softball European Super Cup 2023 Men’s Softball European Super Cup 2023 28/08/2023 02/09/2023

October Men's European Softball Masters Cup 2023 Men's European Softball Masters Cup 2023 25/10/2023 28/10/2023

October Women's European Softball Masters 2023 Women's European Softball Masters 2023

== Members ==
=== Baseball ===
Code	Association	National teams	Founded	Member since	Membership	IOC member	Note
ARM	Armenia	(M, W)	2005	2005	Full	Yes	
AUT	Austria	(M, W)	1983	1983	Full	Yes	
BLR	Belarus	(M, W)	1992	1994	Full	Yes	
BEL	Belgium	(M, W)	1975	1953	Full	Yes	
BUL	Bulgaria	(M, W)	1988	1992	Full	Yes	
CRO	Croatia	(M, W)	1986	1992	Full	Yes	
CYP	Cyprus	(M, W)		1999	Full	Yes	
CZE	Czech Republic	(M, W)	1992	1993	Full	Yes	
DEN	Denmark	(M, W)	2008	1979	Full	Yes	
EST	Estonia	(M, W)	2016	1992	Full	Yes	
FIN	Finland	(M, W)	1981	1981	Full	Yes	
FRA	France	(M, W)	1924	1953	Full	Yes	
GEO	(Georgia (country)) Georgia	(M, W)	1992	1992	Full	Yes	
GER	Germany	(M, W)	1950	1953	Full	Yes	
GBR	(United Kingdom) Great Britain	(M, W)	1987	1960	Full	Yes	
GRE	Greece	(M, W)	1997	1999	Full	Yes	
HUN	Hungary	(M, W)	1992	1993	Full	Yes	
IRL	(Republic of Ireland) Ireland	(M, W)	1989	1994	Full	Yes	
ISR	Israel	(M, W)	1986	1995	Full	Yes	
ITA	Italy	(M, W)		1969 (Note: Member from 1953 to 1967 as well.)	Full	Yes	
KOS	Kosovo	(M, W)	2006	2019	Full	Yes	
LAT	Latvia	(M, W)	2007	2009	Full	Yes	
LTU	Lithuania	(M, W)	1992	1992	Full	Yes	
LUX	Luxembourg	(M, W)	2002	2025	Full	Yes	
MLT	Malta	(M, W)	1983	1983	Full	Yes	
MDA	Moldova	(M, W)	1992	1993	Full	Yes	
NED	Netherlands	(M, W)	1912	1969 (Note: Member from 1956 to 1967 as well.)	Full	Yes	
NOR	Norway	(M, W)	1991	1993	Full	Yes	
POL	Poland	(M, W)	1978	1990	Full	Yes	
POR	Portugal	(M, W)	1996	1994	Full	Yes	
ROU	Romania	(M, W)	1990	1991	Full	Yes	
RUS	Russia	(M, W)	1987	1992	Full	Yes	
SMR	San Marino	(M, W)	1969	1971	Full	Yes	
SRB	Serbia	(M, W)	2006	2006	Full	Yes	
SVK	Slovakia	(M, W)		1993	Full	Yes	
SLO	Slovenia	(M, W)		1992	Full	Yes	
ESP	Spain	(M, W)	1944	1953	Full	Yes	
SWE	Sweden	(M, W)	1956	1957	Full	Yes	
SUI	Switzerland	(M, W)	1981	1982	Full	Yes	
TUR	Turkey	(M, W)	2001	2001	Full	Yes	
UKR	Ukraine	(M, W)	1992	1992	Full	Yes	

=== Softball ===
Code	Association	National teams	Founded	Member since	Membership	IOC member	Note
AUT	Austria	(M, W)	1983	1983	Full	Yes	
BEL	Belgium	(M, W)	1975	1953	Full	Yes	
BUL	Bulgaria	(M, W)	1988	1992	Full	Yes	
CRO	Croatia	(M, W)	1994	1992	Full	Yes	
CYP	Cyprus	(M, W)		1999	Full	Yes	
CZE	Czech Republic	(M, W)	1963	1993	Full	Yes	
DEN	Denmark	(M, W)	1978	1979	Full	Yes	
FIN	Finland	(M, W)	1981	1981	Full	Yes	
FRA	France	(M, W)	1924	1953	Full	Yes	
GEO	(Georgia (country)) Georgia	(M, W)		1992	Full	Yes	
GER	Germany	(M, W)	1950	1953	Full	Yes	
GBR	(United Kingdom) Great Britain	(M, W)	1988	1960	Full	Yes	
GRE	Greece	(M, W)	1997	1999	Full	Yes	
GGY	Guernsey	(M, W)	1950	1953	Provisional	No	(Note: Crown Dependencies of United Kingdom.)
HUN	Hungary	(M, W)	1992	1993	Full	Yes	
IRL	(Republic of Ireland) Ireland	(M, W)	1989	1994	Full	Yes	
ISR	Israel	(M, W)	1979	1995	Full	Yes	
ITA	Italy	(M, W)		1969 (Note: Member from 1953 to 1967 as well.)	Full	Yes	
KOS	Kosovo	(M, W)	2006		Full	Yes	
LTU	Lithuania	(M, W)	2014	1992	Full	Yes	
MLT	Malta	(M, W)	1983	1983	Full	Yes	
MDA	Moldova	(M, W)		1993	Full	Yes	
NED	Netherlands	(M, W)	1912	1969 (Note: Member from 1956 to 1967 as well.)	Full	Yes	
NOR	Norway	(M, W)	1991	1993	Full	Yes	
POL	Poland	(M, W)	1978	1990	Full	Yes	
ROU	Romania	(M, W)	1990	1991	Full	Yes	
RUS	Russia	(M, W)	1987	1992	Full	Yes	
SMR	San Marino	(M, W)	1969	1971	Full	Yes	
SRB	Serbia	(M, W)	2005	2006	Full	Yes	
SVK	Slovakia	(M, W)	1991	1993	Full	Yes	
SLO	Slovenia	(M, W)		1992	Full	Yes	
ESP	Spain	(M, W)	1944	1953	Full	Yes	
SWE	Sweden	(M, W)	1956	1957	Full	Yes	
SUI	Switzerland	(M, W)		1982	Full	Yes	
TUR	Turkey	(M, W)	2001	2001	Full	Yes	
UKR	Ukraine	(M, W)	1992	1992	Full	Yes	

=== Former members ===
Association	Baseball National teams	Softball National teams	Years
Czechoslovakia	(M, W)	(M, W)	1989–1993
Iceland	(M, W)	(M, W)	
Serbia and Montenegro	(M, W)	(M, W)	1996–2006
Soviet Union	(M, W)	(M, W)	1987–1991
Tunisia	(M, W)	(M, W)	1957–1962
(Socialist Federal Republic of Yugoslavia) Yugoslavia	(M, W)	(M, W)	1983–1992

== See also ==
- European Softball Federation
- European Men's Baseball Championship
- European Champions Cup (baseball)
