= 2012 ESF Men's Super Club Championship =

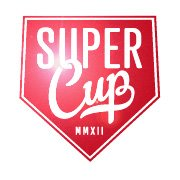

Tournament details
- Host country: Czech Republic
- Dates: 27 August - 1 September
- Teams: 16
- Defending champions: Denmark (Hurricanes 2011)

Final positions
- Champions: Hurricanes Denmark (1st title)
- Runner-up: Roma Italy
- Third place: Spikes Netherlands
- Fourth place: Storks Netherlands

Tournament statistics
- Games played: 52

The 2012 ESF men's Super Cup club championships was an international softball competition for men's fastpitch being held at Eagles Park and Svoboda Park in Prague, Czech Republic from August 27 to September 1, 2012. The Super Cup was a new edition of the ESF Men's European Cup, merging the old European Cup with the ESF Cup Winners Cup. The teams first competed in pool play, with the top 8 teams qualifying for the Super Cup, and the bottom 8 teams playing for the ESF Challenge Cup. After pool play, the setup for both the Super Cup and the Challenge Cup was a double elimination knockout system. In the end, the Hørsholm Hurricanes won the first Super Cup title.

== First round ==
=== Pool A ===
Teams	W	L	Pct.	GB	R	RA
Eagles Czech Republic	3	0	1.000	–	12	3
Bulls Denmark	2	1	.667	1	19	3
Cavigal France	1	2	.333	2	10	9
Indians Slovakia	0	3	.000	3	2	28

=== Pool B ===
Teams	W	L	Pct.	GB	R	RA
Lupi Roma Italy	3	0	1.000	–	8	2
Storks Netherlands	2	1	.667	1	12	6
Hippos Czech Republic	1	2	.333	2	12	7
Pessac France	0	3	.000	3	5	22

=== Pool C ===
Teams	W	L	Pct.	GB	R	RA
Hurricanes Denmark	3	0	1.000	–	18	0
DVH Netherlands	2	1	.667	1	26	1
Beavers Czech Republic	1	2	.333	2	9	18
Medvedi Croatia	0	3	.000	3	2	36

=== Pool D ===
Teams	W	L	Pct.	GB	R	RA
Spectrum Czech Republic	3	0	1.000	–	23	6
Spikes Netherlands	2	1	.667	1	12	17
Chicaboo's Belgium	1	2	.333	2	10	16
Vikings Denmark	0	3	.000	3	6	12

Qualified for the Super Cup

== Super Cup Knock Out round ==
Date	Match			Score	Comments
29.08.2012	EaglesCzech Republic	-	SpikesNetherlands	0-5	
29.08.2012	HurricanesDenmark	-	StorksNetherlands	9-0	
29.08.2012	SpectrumCzech Republic	-	BullsDenmark	2-3	
29.08.2012	Lupi RomaItaly	-	DVHNetherlands	2-0	
30.08.2012	EaglesCzech Republic	-	StorksNetherlands	0-10	Eagles eliminated
30.08.2012	SpectrumCzech Republic	-	DVHNetherlands	2-1	DVH eliminated
30.08.2012	SpikesNetherlands	-	HurricanesDenmark	5-3	
30.08.2012	BullsDenmark	-	Lupi RomaItaly	1-4	
31.08.2012	BullsDenmark	-	StorksNetherlands	2-5	Bulls eliminated
31.08.2012	HurricanesDenmark	-	SpectrumCzech Republic	3-2	Spectrum eliminated

== Challenge Cup Knock Out round ==
Date	Match			Score	Comments
29.08.2012	CavigalFrance	-	VikingsDenmark	0-5	
29.08.2012	BeaversCzech Republic	-	PanteresFrance	6-2	
29.08.2012	Chicaboo'sBelgium	-	IndiansSlovakia	8-1	
29.08.2012	HipposCzech Republic	-	MedvediCroatia	12-5	
30.08.2012	CavigalFrance	-	PanteresFrance	9-4	Panteres eliminated
30.08.2012	IndiansSlovakia	-	MedvediCroatia	7-4	Medvedi eliminated
30.08.2012	VikingsDenmark	-	BeaversCzech Republic	4-0	
30.08.2012	Chicaboo'sBelgium	-	HipposCzech Republic	0-7	
01.09.2012	Chicaboo'sBelgium	-	CavigalFrance	12-1	Cavigal eliminated
01.09.2012	BeaversCzech Republic	-	IndiansSlovakia	3-6	Indians eliminated

== Super Cup playoffs ==
=== Medal round ===
Semi-finals
W1	SpikesNetherlands	0
W2	Lupi RomaItaly	8
W5	StorksNetherlands	0
W6	HurricanesDenmark	8

Bronze Medal
L7	SpikesNetherlands	0
W8	HurricanesDenmark	9

Gold Medal
W7	Lupi RomaItaly	2
W9	HurricanesDenmark	7

== Challenge Cup playoffs ==
=== Final round ===
Semi-finals
W1	VikingsDenmark	4
W2	HipposCzech Republic	3
W5	Chicaboo'sBelgium	13
W6	IndiansSlovakia	5

Third place
L7	HipposCzech Republic	0
W8	Chicaboo'sBelgium	2

Final
W7	VikingsDenmark	5
W9	Chicaboo'sBelgium	3

== Final standings ==
Rk	Team	W	L
1	HurricanesDenmark	8	1
2	Lupi RomaItaly	6	1
3	SpikesNetherlands	4	3
4	StorksNetherlands	4	3
5	BullsDenmark	5	3
6	SpectrumCzech Republic	4	2
7	DVHNetherlands	2	3
8	EaglesCzech Republic	3	2
9	VikingsDenmark	4	3
10	Chicaboo'sBelgium	5	4
11	HipposCzech Republic	3	4
12	IndiansSlovakia	2	5
13	BeaversCzech Republic	2	4
14	CavigalFrance	2	4
15	PantheresFrance	0	5
16	MedvediCroatia	0	5

2012 ESF Men's Super Cup Club Champions: Hørsholm Hurricanes

Denmark
1st title

== See also ==
- Softball
- European Softball Federation
- ESF men's EC club championships
