= 2011 ESF Men's European Club Championship =

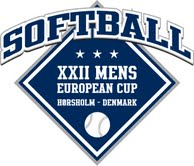

Tournament details
- Host country: Denmark
- Dates: 22 August - 27 August
- Teams: 9
- Defending champions: Czech Republic (Beavers 2010)

Final positions
- Champions: Hurricanes Denmark (1st title)
- Runner-up: Magos Spain
- Third place: Spectrum Czech Republic
- Fourth place: Beavers Czech Republic

Tournament statistics
- Games played: 40

The 2011 ESF men's EC club championships was an international softball competition being held at Hurricane Park, Hørsholm, Denmark from August 22 to August 27, 2011. It was the 22nd edition of the tournament and in the end, the Hørsholm Hurricanes won their first title.

== First round ==
=== Pool A ===
Teams	W	L	Pct.	GB	R	RA
Spectrum Czech Republic	7	1	.875	–	50	20
Hurricanes Denmark	6	2	.750	1	46	16
Beavers Czech Republic	5	3	.625	2	36	13
Magos Spain	5	3	.625	2	27	25
Braves Belgium	5	3	.625	2	50	35
DVH Netherlands	4	4	.500	3	28	21
Roma Italy	2	6	.250	5	16	21
Medvedi Croatia	1	7	.125	6	12	84
Pantheres France	1	7	.125	6	12	42

Qualified for the playoffs

== Playoffs ==
=== Medal round ===
Day One
W1	SpectrumCzech Republic	2
W2	HurricanesDenmark	8
W5	BeaversCzech Republic	0
W6	MagosSpain	9

Bronze Medal
L7	SpectrumCzech Republic	2
W8	MagosSpain	13

Gold Medal
W7	HurricanesDenmark	1
W9	MagosSpain	0

== Final standings ==
Rk	Team	W	L
1	HurricanesDenmark	8	2
2	MagosSpain	7	4
Failed to qualify for the Gold medal game
3	SpectrumCzech Republic	7	3
4	BeaversCzech Republic	5	4
Failed to qualify for the Playoffs
5	BravesBelgium	5	3
6	DVHNetherlands	4	4
7	RomaItaly	2	6
8	MedvediCroatia	1	7
9	PantheresFrance	1	7

2011 ESF Men's European Club Champions: HØRSHOLM HURRICANES

Denmark
1st title
