= 2023 Baseball5 European Championship =

Tournament details
- Country: Lithuania
- Dates: 7–11 November
- Teams: 13

Final positions
- Champions: Lithuania (1st title)
- Runners-up: France
- Third place: Spain
- Fourth place: Netherlands

The 2023 Baseball5 European Championship was an international baseball5 tournament organized by the WBSC Europe. The championship was held from 7 to 11 November 2023, in the Lithuanian Sports Complex in Druskininkai, Lithuania and was contested between 13 national teams.

Hosts Lithuania won the tournament, beating France in the final 2 sets to 0, in a replay of the 2020 final (won by France). Spain finished third defeating the Netherlands 2 sets to 1 in the bronze medal game.

Lithuania and France qualified for second time in a row to the 2024 Baseball5 World Cup to be held in the Central Harbourfront Event Space in Hong Kong.

== Venues ==
(Lithuania) Druskininkai
Lithuanian Sports Complex
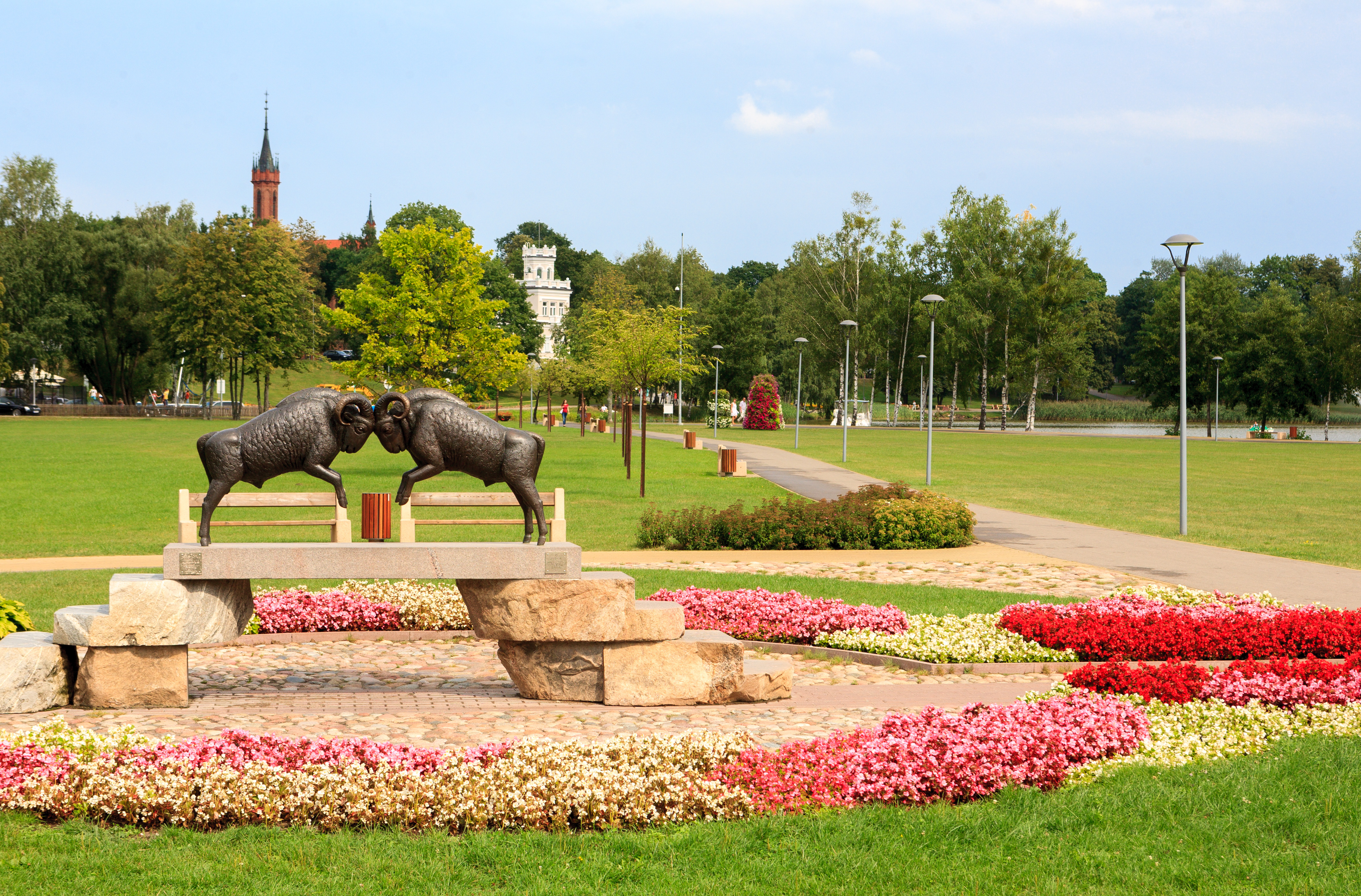

== Qualification round ==
=== Group A ===
Pos	Team	Pld	W	L	PCT	GB	Qualification
1	France	6	6	0	1.000	—	Advance to Super round
2	Netherlands	6	4	2	.667	2	Advance to Super round
3	Spain	6	3	3	.500	3	Advance to Super round
4	Finland	6	3	3	.500	3	Advance to Placement round
5	Bulgaria	6	3	3	.500	3	Advance to Placement round
6	Romania	6	2	4	.333	4	Advance to Placement round
7	Latvia	6	0	6	.000	6	Advance to Placement round

Source: WBSC Europe

=== Group B ===
Pos	Team	Pld	W	L	PCT	GB	Qualification
1	Lithuania (H)	5	5	0	1.000	—	Advance to Super round
2	Belgium	5	4	1	.800	1	Advance to Super round
3	Italy	5	3	2	.600	2	Advance to Super round
4	Czech Republic	5	2	3	.400	3	Advance to Placement round
5	Estonia	5	1	4	.200	4	Advance to Placement round
6	Moldova	5	0	5	.000	5	Advance to Placement round

Source: WBSC Europe
(H) Hosts

== Second round ==
=== Super round ===
Pos	Team	Pld	W	L	PCT	GB	Qualification
1	France	5	5	0	1.000	—	Advance to Gold medal game
2	Lithuania (H)	5	4	1	.800	1	Advance to Gold medal game
3	Spain	5	2	3	.400	3	Advance to Bronze medal game
4	Netherlands	5	2	3	.400	3	Advance to Bronze medal game
5	Belgium	5	1	4	.200	4	
6	Italy	5	1	4	.200	4	

Source: WBSC Europe
(H) Hosts

=== Placement round ===
Pos	Team	Pld	W	L	PCT	GB
1	Finland	6	5	1	.833	—
2	Czech Republic	6	5	1	.833	—
3	Bulgaria	6	5	1	.833	—
4	Romania	6	3	3	.500	2
5	Estonia	6	2	4	.333	3
6	Moldova	6	1	5	.167	4
7	Latvia	6	0	6	.000	5

Source: WBSC Europe

== Final standings ==
Pos	Team	W	L	Qualification
Gold medal	Lithuania	8	1	Qualified for 2024 Baseball5 World Cup
Silver medal	France	9	1	Qualified for 2024 Baseball5 World Cup
Bronze medal	Spain	5	5	
4	Netherlands	6	4	
5	Belgium	4	4	
6	Italy	4	4	
7	Finland	5	4	
8	Czech Republic	5	4	
9	Bulgaria	6	3	
10	Romania	4	5	
11	Estonia	2	7	
12	Moldova	1	8	
13	Latvia	0	9	

== Awards ==
Tournament Awards
Award	Player
Female MVP	(Lithuania) Nomeda Neverauskaitė
Male MVP	(France) Omar Diodene Pacheco
Best Female Hitter	(France) Ambre Brouard
Best Male Hitter	(France) Flavien Hasslauer
Best Female Offensive Player	(France) Amina Taleb
Best Male Offensive Player	(Lithuania) Kristijonas Vicas

All Europe Team
Player
(France) Omar Diodene Pacheco
(Lithuania) Nomeda Neverauskaitė
(Netherlands) Melvin Brandjes
(Bulgaria) Nikol Yordanova
(France) Flavien Hasslauer
(France) Amina Taleb
(Lithuania) Kristijonas Vicas
(Spain) Elia Pascual
