= Spain national Baseball5 team =

Spain

Information
- Country: Spain
- Federation: Royal Spanish Baseball and Softball Federation
- Confederation: WBSC Europe
- Manager: Ángel Yu

WBSC ranking
- Current: 12 (6 May 2026)

Baseball5 European Championship
- Appearances: 1 (first in 2023)
- Best result: (silver) 2nd (1 time, in 2025)

The Spain national Baseball5 team represents Spain in international Baseball5 competitions.

== History ==
Spain first played in the 2023 Baseball5 European Championship, where the team finished the Qualification Round with a 3–3 record, making it to the Super Round. Spain finished third in the Super Round, qualifying for the bronze medal game, where they defeated the Netherlands 2 sets to 1, claiming the bronze medal for the first time in their history.

== Current roster ==
As of 11 November 2023

No.	Pos.	Player	Gender
22	UTL	Michael Blanco	M
30	UTL	Jesús Cortez	M
9	UTL	Carla Linares	F
1	UTL	Marta Ortega	F
8	UTL	Elia Pascual	F
2	UTL	Hilarry Rodríguez	F
21	UTL	Ángel Yu	M
29	UTL	Leonardo Yuque	M

=== Staff ===
No.	Pos.	Name
8	Manager	Ángel Yu

== Tournament record ==
=== Baseball5 European Championship ===
Baseball5 European Championship record
Year	Round	Position	W	L	RS	RA
(Lithuania) 2020	Did not enter					
(Lithuania) 2023	Bronze medal game	3rd	5	5	110	117
(Lithuania) 2025	Finals	2nd	5	1	95	28
Total	2/3	–	10	6	205	145
