= 2022 Women's Softball European Championship =

Tournament details
- Host country: Spain
- Dates: 24 July – 30 July 2022
- Teams: 21
- Defending champions: Italy (2021)

Final positions
- Champions: Netherlands (11th title)
- Runner-up: Great Britain
- Third place: Italy
- Fourth place: Czech Republic

The 2022 Women's Softball European Championship was an international European softball competition held in Sant Boi, Spain from 24 July to 30 July 2022. This was the 23rd edition of the Women's Softball European Championship.

== Round robin 1 ==
=== Group A ===
Pos	Team	Pld	W	L	RF	RA	RD	PCT	GB	Qualification
1	Greece	2	2	0	21	0	+21	1.000	—	Advance to round robin 2
2	Italy	1	1	0	11	0	+11	1.000	0.5	Advance to round robin 2
3	Croatia	2	1	1	5	5	0	.500	1	Advance to classification stage
4	Poland	1	0	1	0	11	−11	.000	1.5	Advance to classification stage
5	Belgium	2	0	2	2	23	−21	.000	2	Advance to classification stage

Updated to match(es) played on 25 July 2022. Source: WBSC

=== Group B ===
Pos	Team	Pld	W	L	RF	RA	RD	PCT	GB	Qualification
1	Netherlands	1	1	0	7	0	+7	1.000	—	Advance to round robin 2
2	Ireland	2	2	0	15	0	+15	1.000	+0.5	Advance to round robin 2
3	Austria	2	1	1	7	4	+3	.500	0.5	Advance to classification stage
4	Germany	1	0	1	0	7	−7	.000	1	Advance to classification stage
5	Switzerland	2	0	2	1	19	−18	.000	1.5	Advance to classification stage

Updated to match(es) played on 25 July 2022. Source: WBSC

=== Group C ===
Pos	Team	Pld	W	L	RF	RA	RD	PCT	GB	Qualification
1	Great Britain	2	2	0	32	0	+32	1.000	—	Advance to round robin 2
2	Czech Republic	1	1	0	9	8	+1	1.000	0.5	Advance to round robin 2
3	Ukraine	2	1	1	20	17	+3	.500	1	Advance to classification stage
4	France	1	0	1	8	9	−1	.000	1.5	Advance to classification stage
5	Turkey	2	0	2	0	35	−35	.000	2	Advance to classification stage

Updated to match(es) played on 25 July 2022. Source: WBSC

=== Group D ===
Pos	Team	Pld	W	L	RF	RA	RD	PCT	GB	Qualification
1	Slovakia	3	3	0	42	5	+37	1.000	—	Advance to round robin 2
2	Israel	1	1	0	7	1	+6	1.000	1	Advance to round robin 2
3	Denmark	2	1	1	17	3	+14	.500	1.5	Advance to classification stage
4	Malta	3	1	2	20	36	−16	.333	2	Advance to classification stage
5	Spain (H)	1	0	1	1	7	−6	.000	2	Advance to classification stage
6	Finland	2	0	2	4	39	−35	.000	2.5	Advance to classification stage

Updated to match(es) played on 25 July 2022. Source: WBSC
(H) Hosts

== Round robin 2 ==
=== Group E ===
Pos	Team	Pld	W	L	RF	RA	RD	PCT	GB	Qualification
1	Great Britain	5	5	0	41	6	+35	1.000	—	Advance to final round robin
2	Italy	5	4	1	34	7	+27	.800	1	Advance to final round robin
3	Israel	5	3	2	23	28	−5	.600	2	Advance to final round robin
4	Germany	5	2	3	23	30	−7	.400	3	Advance to classification stage
5	Ireland	5	1	4	10	31	−21	.200	4	Advance to classification stage
6	France	5	0	5	11	40	−29	.000	5	Advance to classification stage

Updated to match(es) played on 27 July 2022. Source: WBSC

=== Group F ===
Pos	Team	Pld	W	L	RF	RA	RD	PCT	GB	Qualification
1	Netherlands	5	5	0	50	3	+47	1.000	—	Advance to final round robin
2	Czech Republic	5	4	1	28	7	+21	.800	1	Advance to final round robin
3	Spain (H)	5	3	2	19	15	+4	.600	2	Advance to final round robin
4	Greece	5	2	3	21	21	0	.400	3	Advance to classification stage
5	Poland	5	1	4	2	40	−38	.200	4	Advance to classification stage
6	Slovakia	5	0	5	8	42	−34	.000	5	Advance to classification stage

Updated to match(es) played on 27 July 2022. Source: WBSC
(H) Hosts

=== Group G ===
Pos	Team	Pld	W	L	RF	RA	RD	PCT	GB
1	Croatia	8	8	0	65	0	+65	1.000	—
2	Austria	8	7	1	74	17	+57	.875	1
3	Ukraine	8	6	2	63	29	+34	.750	2
4	Belgium	8	5	3	86	34	+52	.625	3
5	Switzerland	8	4	4	65	27	+38	.500	4
6	Denmark	8	3	5	26	59	−33	.375	5
7	Malta	8	2	6	13	78	−65	.250	6
8	Finland	8	1	7	34	105	−71	.125	7
9	Turkey	8	0	8	28	105	−77	.000	8

Updated to match(es) played on 29 July 2022. Source: WBSC

== Final round robin ==
=== Group X ===
Pos	Team	Pld	W	L	RF	RA	RD	PCT	GB	Qualification
1	Great Britain	5	4	1	15	9	+6	.800	—	Advance to championship game
2	Netherlands	5	4	1	17	13	+4	.800	—	Advance to championship game
3	Czech Republic	5	3	2	19	20	−1	.600	1	Advance to bronze medal game
4	Italy	5	3	2	25	5	+20	.600	1	Advance to bronze medal game
5	Spain (H)	5	1	4	8	20	−12	.200	3	Eliminated
6	Israel	5	0	5	13	30	−17	.000	4	Eliminated

Updated to match(es) played on 29 July 2022. Source: WBSC
(H) Hosts

== Classification stage ==
=== Group Y ===
Pos	Team	Pld	W	L	RF	RA	RD	PCT	GB
1	Greece	5	5	0	22	16	+6	1.000	—
2	Germany	5	4	1	22	3	+19	.800	1
3	Ireland	5	3	2	22	10	+12	.600	2
4	France	5	2	3	19	14	+5	.400	3
5	Poland	5	1	4	3	23	−20	.200	4
6	Slovakia	5	0	5	2	24	−22	.000	5

Updated to match(es) played on 29 July 2022. Source: WBSC

==== Bronze medal game ====
30 July 3:00 (CEST) Estadio Municipal de Sófbol Antonio Hervás 28 °C (82 °F)
Team	1	2	3	4	5	6	7	R	H	E
Czech Republic	2	0	0	0	0	0	0	2	6	0
Italy	1	1	0	1	1	0	X	4	9	1
WP: Alexia Lacatena LP: Veronika Pecková Sv: Alice Nicolini; Boxscore

==== Championship game ====
30 July 6:00 (CEST) Estadio Municipal de Sófbol Antonio Hervás 29 °C (84 °F)
Team	1	2	3	4	5	6	7	R	H	E
Netherlands	0	0	3	1	1	0	2	7	11	1
Great Britain	0	0	0	0	0	0	0	0	1	0
WP: Eva Voortman LP: Georgina Corrick; Boxscore

== Final standings ==
Rk	Team	W	L	Pct.
1st place, gold medalist(s)	Netherlands	9	1	.900
2nd place, silver medalist(s)	Great Britain	9	2	.818
3rd place, bronze medalist(s)	Italy	8	2	.800
4	Czech Republic	7	3	.700
5	Spain	4	5	.444
6	Israel	4	5	.444
7	Greece	7	3	.700
8	Germany	4	5	.444
9	Ireland	5	5	.500
10	France	2	7	.222
11	Poland	1	8	.111
12	Slovakia	3	8	.273
13	Croatia	8	1	.889
14	Austria	7	2	.778
15	Ukraine	6	3	.667
16	Belgium	5	4	.556
17	Switzerland	4	5	.444
18	Denmark	3	6	.333
19	Malta	2	7	.222
20	Finland	1	8	.111
21	Turkey	0	9	.000

== Qualified teams for 2024 Women's Softball World Cup ==
The following three teams from Europe qualify for the 2024 Women's Softball World Cup.

Team	Qualified on	Previous appearances in Women's Softball World Cup^{1}
Great Britain	28 July 2022	7 (1994, 2006, 2010, 2012, 2014, 2016, 2018)
Netherlands	28 July 2022	14 (1974, 1978, 1982, 1986, 1990, 1994, 1998, 2002, 2006, 2010, 2012, 2014, 2016, 2018)
Italy	30 July 2022	13 (1974, 1978, 1986, 1990, 1994, 1998, 2002, 2006, 2012, 2014, 2016, 2018, 2022)

^{1} Bold indicates champions for that year. Italic indicates hosts for that year.
