= Royal Belgian Baseball and Softball Federation =

Sports governing body in Belgium

- Sport: Baseball and softball
- Jurisdiction: Belgium
- Abbreviation: KBBSF/FRBBS
- Founded: 1975
- Affiliation: WBSC
- Regional affiliation: WBSC Europe
- Headquarters: Antwerp, Belgium
- President: René Laforce

Official website
- www.kbbsf-frbbs.be
- (Belgium)

The Royal Belgian Baseball and Softball Federation (Dutch: Koninklijke Belgische Base en Softball Federatie; French: Fédération Royale Belge de Base et Softball) is the national governing body of baseball and softball in Belgium. The association was established in 1975.

The Royal Belgian Baseball and Softball Federation is responsible for the national baseball team, the men's national softball team, the women's national softball team and overseeing the two national leagues: the Flemish League and the Walloon League.

== History ==
Baseball was introduced in Belgium in the 1920s when American and Japanese sailors played the sport on the Antwerp docks. Baseball was rapidly spread amongst locals and the first league, the Flemish League, was established in the 1930s.

In April 1953, Belgium was one of the founding members of the Confederation of European Baseball (now WBSC Europe), alongside France, Italy, Spain and West Germany. Delegates from each one of the countries met in Paris and established the Fédération Européenne de Baseball (European Baseball Federation).

The Royal Belgian Baseball and Softball Federation was established in 1975. In 1976, the KBBSF/FRBBS was one of the founding members of the European Softball Federation, the others being France, Italy, Netherlands, Spain and West Germany.

Today, the KBBSF/FRBBS has 4100 members, over 2900 active players and 45 clubs.

== Teams ==
The Royal Belgian Baseball and Softball Federation oversees the development of the following national baseball and softball teams:

Baseball

- Belgium national baseball team
- Belgium national under-23 baseball team
- Belgium national under-18 baseball team
- Belgium national under-15 baseball team
- Belgium national under-12 baseball team

Softball

- Belgium men's national softball team
- Belgium women's national softball team
- Belgium women's national under-22 baseball team
- Belgium women's national under-18 baseball team
- Belgium women's national under-15 baseball team
