= Norway national baseball team =

Information
- Country: Norway
- Federation: Norwegian Softball and Baseball Federation
- Confederation: Confederation of European Baseball
- Manager: Alec Haralovich

WBSC ranking
- Current: 68 ▲2 (26 March 2026)

The Norway national baseball team represents Norway in international baseball competitions. Governed by the Norwegian Softball and Baseball Federation (NSBF), the team competes in the European Baseball Championship and the annual Nordic Baseball Championship against its Scandinavian rivals Sweden, Denmark, and Finland.

Though baseball remains a niche sport in Norway, the national program has grown steadily since its first major international appearance in 2016. The team earned its first European Championship B-Pool berth in 2024 and recorded its first B-Pool victory that same year, defeating Bulgaria 14–3 in Ireland.

== History ==
=== Early years and C-Pool debut (2016) ===
Norway first competed on the European stage at the 2016 European Baseball Championship C-Pool, marking a milestone for the country's fledgling baseball community. The tournament provided critical international experience and set the foundation for future development.

=== Rise through the Nordics (2023–2024) ===
At the 2023 Nordic Baseball Tournament, Norway defeated Finland 8–7, signaling the program's growing competitiveness. The following year proved to be a breakthrough: Norway qualified for the 2024 European Championship B-Pool in Ireland — a significant step up in competition level.

In the B-Pool, Norway opened with a dominant 14–3 victory over Bulgaria, the team's first-ever win at that level. They went on to face Austria and hosts Ireland, finishing the tournament with a 1–2 record.

=== 2025 Nordic Baseball Championship ===
Norway posted a 2–2 record at the 2025 Nordic Baseball Championship, highlighted by a 12–0 shutout of Finland and a dramatic 10–9 comeback win over Sweden.

== Team colors and uniforms ==
Norway's team colors are navy blue ( ) and red ( ), reflecting the colors of the Norwegian flag. Home uniforms feature navy blue jerseys with "NORWAY" across the chest in white lettering, paired with red accents on the caps and sleeves.

== Coaching staff ==
Role	Name
Head coach	Andy Johnson
General Manager	Alec Haralovich
Assistant Coach	Sigmund Eldevik

== Roster ==
Norway's roster for the 2025 Nordic Baseball Championship:

Norway national baseball team – Nordic Baseball Championship 2025 roster
Players		Coaches
Pitchers: 2 Magnus Johnson; 3 Teddy Deutsch; 12 Charles Conrad; 14 Benjamin Davis; 20 Brage Larssen; 21 Emil Fjellvang; 22 Lars Liguori; 32 Steffen Torgersen	Catchers: 6 Tye Brødsjø; 9 Gunnar Henriksen; Infielders: 2 Magnus Johnson; 12 Charles Conrad; 14 Benjamin Davis; 20 Brage Larssen; 22 Lars Liguori; 32 Steffen Torgersen; Outfielders: 3 Teddy Deutsch; 5 Alberto Danzie; 8 Paul Yuan; 10 Håkon Nordli; 39 Stephen Meinich-Bache	Manager: 42 Andy Johnson; Coaches: 5 Sigmund Eldevik

== Competitive record ==
=== European Baseball Championship ===
Year	Host	Pool	W	L	Result
2016	—	C-Pool	—	—	Participated
2024	Ireland	B-Pool	1	2	Group stage

=== Nordic Baseball Championship ===
Year	W	L	Notable results
2025	2	2	Beat Finland 12–0; beat Sweden 10–9
2024 (Nordic Cup)	0	3	
2023	1	1	Beat Finland 8–7

== See also ==
- Norway national softball team
- Baseball in Norway
- Norwegian Softball and Baseball Federation
- European Baseball Championship
