= 2010 European Under-21 Baseball Championship =

Tournament details
- Country: Czech Republic
- Dates: 17 August - 22 August
- Teams: 6
- Defending champions: Spain

Final positions
- Champions: Czech Republic
- Runners-up: Russia
- Third place: France
- Fourth place: Ukraine

Tournament statistics
- Games played: 16
- Attendance: 3,543 (221 per game)
- Best BA: (Ukraine) Maksym Symchyna (.524)
- Most HRs: (Slovakia) Oliver Pentek (1)
- Most SBs: (Czech Republic) Michal Ondracek (8–8)
- Best ERA: (Ukraine) Roman Maifat (0.00)
- Most Ks (as pitcher): (Ukraine) Roman Maifat (12)
- All statistics correct as of August 22, 2010.

The 2010 European Under-21 Baseball Championship is an international baseball competition held in Brno, Czech Republic from August 17 to 22, 2010. It features teams from Czech Republic, France, Italy, Russia, Slovakia and Ukraine.

== Round 1 ==
=== Standings ===
Teams	W	L	Pct.	GB	R	RA
Czech Republic	4	1	.800	—	37	19
Russia	3	2	.600	1	42	21
France	3	2	.600	1	24	31
Ukraine	2	3	.400	2	27	31
Italy	2	3	.400	2	33	29
Slovakia	1	4	.200	3	25	57

=== Schedule ===
August 17, 2010	Ukraine	4 – 1	Italy	AVG Baseball Arena, Brno; Attendance: 50
August 17, 2010		Boxscore		AVG Baseball Arena, Brno; Attendance: 50

August 17, 2010	Russia	15 – 0 (F/5)	Slovakia	Kravi Hora Ballpark, Brno; Attendance: 40
August 17, 2010		Boxscore		Kravi Hora Ballpark, Brno; Attendance: 40

August 17, 2010	Czech Republic	4 – 3 (F/10)	France	AVG Baseball Arena, Brno; Attendance: 400
August 17, 2010		Boxscore		AVG Baseball Arena, Brno; Attendance: 400

August 18, 2010	Italy	7 – 4	Russia	AVG Baseball Arena, Brno; Attendance: 75
August 18, 2010		Boxscore		AVG Baseball Arena, Brno; Attendance: 75

August 18, 2010	France	7 – 3	Ukraine	Kravi Hora Ballpark, Brno; Attendance: 40
August 18, 2010		Boxscore		Kravi Hora Ballpark, Brno; Attendance: 40

August 18, 2010	Slovakia	2 – 12 (F/7)	Czech Republic	AVG Baseball Arena, Brno; Attendance: 400
August 18, 2010		Boxscore		AVG Baseball Arena, Brno; Attendance: 400

August 19, 2010	France	7 – 6 (F/10)	Slovakia	AVG Baseball Arena, Brno; Attendance: 53
August 19, 2010		Boxscore		AVG Baseball Arena, Brno; Attendance: 53

August 19, 2010	Russia	7 – 6	Ukraine	Kravi Hora Ballpark, Brno; Attendance: 45
August 19, 2010		Boxscore		Kravi Hora Ballpark, Brno; Attendance: 45

August 19, 2010	Italy	5 – 12	Czech Republic	AVG Baseball Arena, Brno; Attendance: 600
August 19, 2010		Boxscore		AVG Baseball Arena, Brno; Attendance: 600

August 20, 2010	Italy	5 – 6	France	AVG Baseball Arena, Brno; Attendance: 100
August 20, 2010		Boxscore		AVG Baseball Arena, Brno; Attendance: 100

August 20, 2010	Ukraine	8 – 14	Slovakia	Kravi Hora Ballpark, Brno; Attendance: 40
August 20, 2010		Boxscore		Kravi Hora Ballpark, Brno; Attendance: 40

August 20, 2010	Russia	3 – 7	Czech Republic	AVG Baseball Arena, Brno; Attendance: 600
August 20, 2010		Boxscore		AVG Baseball Arena, Brno; Attendance: 600

August 21, 2010	Czech Republic	2 – 6	Ukraine	AVG Baseball Arena, Brno; Attendance: 200
August 21, 2010		Boxscore		AVG Baseball Arena, Brno; Attendance: 200

August 21, 2010	Slovakia	3 – 15	Italy	Kravi Hora Ballpark, Brno; Attendance: 50
August 21, 2010		Boxscore		Kravi Hora Ballpark, Brno; Attendance: 50

August 21, 2010	France	1 – 13 (F/7)	Russia	AVG Baseball Arena, Brno; Attendance: 150
August 21, 2010		Boxscore		AVG Baseball Arena, Brno; Attendance: 150

== Finals ==
=== Final Game ===
August 22, 2010	Czech Republic	7 – 2	Russia	AVG Baseball Arena, Brno; Attendance: 700
August 22, 2010		Boxscore		AVG Baseball Arena, Brno; Attendance: 700
