= Luxembourg national baseball team =

National baseball team

Information
- Country: Luxembourg
- Federation: Baseball & Softball Federation of Luxembourg
- Confederation: WBSC Europe

WBSC ranking
- Current: NR (26 March 2026)

The Luxembourg national baseball team is the national baseball team of Luxembourg. The team represents Luxembourg in international competitions of baseball.
