= Romanian Baseball and Softball Federation =

Sports governing body in Romania

Romanian Baseball and Softball Federation Federația Română de Baseball și Softball
- Sport: Baseball and softball
- Jurisdiction: Romania
- Abbreviation: RBSF
- Founded: 1990
- Affiliation: WBSC
- Regional affiliation: WBSC Europe
- Headquarters: Bucharest, Romania
- President: Cristian Manea
- Coach: Bogdan Pîrvu

Official website
- baseball-softball.ro
- (Romania)

The Romanian Baseball and Softball Federation (Romanian: Federația Română de Baseball și Softball) is the national governing body of baseball and softball in Romania. The federation was established on 4 February 1990.

The Romanian Baseball and Softball Federation is responsible for the national baseball team and overseeing the Romanian Baseball League.

== History ==
Oină, a traditional Romanian sport, similar to baseball, has been practiced in Romania since the 14th century. The RBSF was established on 4 February 1990 as the Romanian Baseball Federation. In 1993, the RBF started sponsoring softball and changed its name to Romanian Baseball and Softball Federation.

== Presidents ==
- 1990–1997: Aurică Stoian
- 1997–2001: Marian Ciocârlan
- 2001–2009: Vasile Molan
- 2009–2012: Valer Toma
- 2012–2022: Andrei Mirescu
- 2022–present: Cristian Manea
