= Romania national baseball team =

Romanian national baseball team

Information
- Country: Romania
- Federation: Romanian Baseball and Softball Federation
- Confederation: WBSC Europe
- Manager: Bogdan Pîrvu

WBSC ranking
- Current: 77 (26 March 2026)

The Romanian national baseball team is the national baseball team of Romania. The team represents Romania in international competitions.

== Roster ==
Romania's roster for the European Baseball Championship Qualifier 2022, the last official competition in which the team took part.

Romania national baseball team – European Baseball Championship Qualifier 2022 roster
Players		Coaches
Pitchers: 9 George George; 33 Razvan Ivan; 22 Iustin-Andrei Lazăr; 16 Edy Pîrvu; 23 Beniamin Pîrvu; 19 Bogdan Pîrvu; 32 Iulian Șerban	Catchers: 14 Vali Constantin; 19 Bogdan Pîrvu; Infielders: 9 George George; 18 Dudu Ionescu; 33 Razvan Ivan; 22 Iustin-Andrei Lazăr; 26 Cătălin-Florin Morea; 7 Andrei Vladimir Oprișan; 16 Edy Pîrvu; 17 Ionuț Valentin Stancu; Outfielders: 6 Alexandru Anghelachi; 14 Vali Constantin; 15 Răzvan-Ștefan Gyarmati-Pintea; 23 Beniamin Pîrvu; 23 Gabriel Relenschi; 32 Iulian Șerban	Manager: 19 Bogdan Pîrvu; Coaches: 16 Edy Pîrvu; 32 Iulian Șerban

== Tournament results ==
European Juveniles Baseball Championship

- 2009 : 8th
