= 2025 Baseball5 European Championship =

Tournament details
- Country: Lithuania
- Dates: 3–8 November
- Teams: 15

Final positions
- Champions: France (2nd title)
- Runners-up: Spain
- Third place: Turkey
- Fourth place: Lithuania

The 2025 Baseball5 European Championship was an international baseball5 tournament organized by the WBSC Europe. The championship was held from 3 to 8 November 2023, in Kalnapilio Arena in Panevėžys, Lithuania and was contested between 15 national teams.

== Venues ==
(Lithuania) Panevėžys
Kalnapilio Arena
Capacity: 5,600

== Qualification round ==
=== Group A ===
| Pos | Team | Pld | W | L | PCT | GB |
|---|---|---|---|---|---|---|
| 1 | France | 3 | 3 | 0 | 1.000 | — |
| 2 | Italy | 3 | 2 | 1 | .667 | 1 |
| 3 | Denmark | 3 | 1 | 2 | .333 | 2 |
| 4 | Ukraine | 3 | 0 | 3 | .000 | 3 |

Source: WBSC Europe

| Date | Time | | Score | | Set 1 | Set 2 | Set 3 | Total | Report |
|---|---|---|---|---|---|---|---|---|---|
| 4 Nov | 9:00 | Denmark | 0-2 | Italy | 0-8 | 4-9 | | 4-17 | Report |
| 4 Nov | 12:30 | France | 2-0 | Ukraine | 10-0 | 14-0 | | 24-0 | Report |
| 4 Nov | 16:30 | Ukraine | 0-2 | Italy | 1-5 | 1-11 | | 2-16 | Report |
| 5 Nov | 10:30 | Denmark | 0-2 | France | 1-5 | 1-9 | | 2-14 | Report |
| 5 Nov | 13:30 | Italy | 0-2 | France | 0-10 | 2-5 | | 2-15 | Report |
| 5 Nov | 16:30 | Ukraine | 0-2 | Denmark | 0-6 | 1-4 | | 1-10 | Report |

=== Group B ===
| Pos | Team | Pld | W | L | PCT | GB |
|---|---|---|---|---|---|---|
| 1 | Lithuania | 3 | 3 | 0 | 1.000 | — |
| 2 | Bulgaria | 3 | 2 | 1 | .667 | 1 |
| 3 | Romania | 3 | 1 | 2 | .333 | 2 |
| 4 | Israel | 3 | 0 | 3 | .000 | 3 |

Source: WBSC Europe

| Date | Time | | Score | | Set 1 | Set 2 | Set 3 | Total | Report |
|---|---|---|---|---|---|---|---|---|---|
| 4 Nov | 9:30 | Bulgaria | 2-0 | Romania | 5-3 | 9-8 | | 14-11 | Report |
| 4 Nov | 15:00 | Romania | 0-2 | Lithuania | 1-6 | 0-10 | | 1-16 | Report |
| 4 Nov | 18:30 | Israel | 0-2 | Romania | 0-5 | 0-5 | | 0-10 | Report |
| 5 Nov | 11:00 | Bulgaria | 0-2 | Lithuania | 0-10 | 0-15 | | 0-25 | Report |
| 5 Nov | 14:00 | Lithuania | 2-0 | Israel | 5-0 | 5-0 | | 10-0 | Report |
| 5 Nov | 18:30 | Israel | 0-2 | Bulgaria | 0-5 | 0-5 | | 0-10 | Report |

=== Group C ===
| Pos | Team | Pld | W | L | PCT | GB |
|---|---|---|---|---|---|---|
| 1 | Spain | 3 | 3 | 0 | 1.000 | — |
| 2 | Estonia | 3 | 2 | 1 | .667 | 1 |
| 3 | Belgium | 3 | 1 | 2 | .333 | 2 |
| 4 | Croatia | 3 | 0 | 3 | .000 | 3 |

Source: WBSC Europe

| Date | Time | | Score | | Set 1 | Set 2 | Set 3 | Total | Report |
|---|---|---|---|---|---|---|---|---|---|
| 4 Nov | 10:30 | Croatia | 0-2 | Belgium | 2-12 | 0-12 | | 2-24 | Report |
| 4 Nov | 15:30 | Spain | 2-0 | Estonia | 12-0 | 13-0 | | 25-0 | Report |
| 4 Nov | 18:00 | Estonia | 2-0 | Belgium | 4-2 | 3-2 | | 7-4 | Report |
| 5 Nov | 12:00 | Croatia | 0-2 | Spain | 0-10 | 0-18 | | 0-28 | Report |
| 5 Nov | 15:30 | Belgium | 0-2 | Spain | 0-7 | 4-5 | | 4-12 | Report |
| 5 Nov | 18:00 | Estonia | 2-0 | Croatia | 14-4 | 5-0 | | 19-4 | Report |

=== Group D ===
| Pos | Team | Pld | W | L | PCT | GB |
|---|---|---|---|---|---|---|
| 1 | Turkey | 3 | 3 | 0 | 1.000 | — |
| 2 | Netherlands | 3 | 2 | 1 | .667 | 1 |
| 3 | Moldova | 3 | 1 | 2 | .333 | 2 |
| 4 | Poland | 3 | 0 | 3 | .000 | 3 |

Source: WBSC Europe

| Date | Time | | Score | | Set 1 | Set 2 | Set 3 | Total | Report |
|---|---|---|---|---|---|---|---|---|---|
| 4 Nov | 11:00 | Poland | 0-2 | Netherlands | 0-11 | 8-19 | | 8-30 | Report |
| 4 Nov | 12:00 | Turkey | 2-0 | Moldova | 27-0 | 8-0 | | 35-0 | Report |
| 4 Nov | 17:00 | Moldova | 0-2 | Netherlands | 3-14 | 3-10 | | 6-24 | Report |
| 5 Nov | 12:30 | Poland | 0-2 | Turkey | 2-19 | 3-23 | | 5-42 | Report |
| 5 Nov | 15:00 | Netherlands | 0-2 | Turkey | 3-4 | 2-13 | | 5-17 | Report |
| 5 Nov | 17:00 | Moldova | 2-0 | Poland | 6-3 | 8-7 | | 14-10 | Report |

== Knockout stage ==
Round of 16
6 November
Denmark | 2
Netherlands | 0
6 November
Poland | 0
France | 2
6 November
Moldova | 0
Italy | 2
6 November
Ukraine | 0
Turkey | 2
6 November
Romania | 2
Estonia | 0
6 November
Croatia | 0
Lithuania | 2
6 November
Belgium | 2
Bulgaria | 1
6 November
bye | 0
Spain | 2

Quarterfinals
7 November
Denmark | 0
France | 2
7 November
Italy | 0
Turkey | 2
7 November
Romania | 0
Lithuania | 2
7 November
Belgium | 0
Spain | 2

Semifinals
8 November
France | 2
Turkey | 0
8 November
Lithuania | 1
Spain | 2

Final
8 November
France | 2
Spain | 0
3rd place
8 November
Turkey | 2
Lithuania | 1

=== Round of 16 ===
| Date | Time | | Score | | Set 1 | Set 2 | Set 3 | Total | Report |
|---|---|---|---|---|---|---|---|---|---|
| 6 Nov | 10:30 | Poland | 0-2 | France | 0-28 | 1-11 | | 1-39 | Report |
| 6 Nov | 11:00 | Moldova | 0-2 | Italy | 0-15 | 1-11 | | 1-26 | Report |
| 6 Nov | 12:00 | Croatia | 0-2 | Lithuania | 0-15 | 0-23 | | 0-38 | Report |
| 6 Nov | 12:30 | Belgium | 2-1 | Bulgaria | 3-2 | 2-4 | 7-1 | 12-7 | Report |
| 6 Nov | 13:30 | Ukraine | 0-2 | Turkey | 4-17 | 0-13 | | 4-30 | Report |
| 6 Nov | 14:00 | Denmark | 2-0 | Netherlands | 8-6 | 6-5 | | 14-11 | Report |
| 6 Nov | 15:00 | Romania | 2-0 | Estonia | 13-0 | 3-1 | | 16-1 | Report |
| 6 Nov | 15:30 | bye | 0-2 | Spain | 0-5 | 0-5 | | 0-10 | |

=== Quarterfinals ===
| Date | Time | | Score | | Set 1 | Set 2 | Set 3 | Total | Report |
|---|---|---|---|---|---|---|---|---|---|
| 7 Nov | 13:30 | Italy | 0-2 | Turkey | 4-6 | 0-12 | | 4-18 | Report |
| 7 Nov | 15:00 | Denmark | 0-2 | France | 3-13 | 0-16 | | 3-29 | Report |
| 7 Nov | 16:30 | Romania | 0-2 | Lithuania | 0-3 | 4-10 | | 4-13 | Report |
| 7 Nov | 18:00 | Belgium | 0-2 | Spain | 0-8 | 0-8 | | 0-16 | Report |

=== Semifinals ===
| Date | Time | | Score | | Set 1 | Set 2 | Set 3 | Total | Report |
|---|---|---|---|---|---|---|---|---|---|
| 8 Nov | 10:30 | France | 2-0 | Turkey | 9-2 | 3-2 | | 12-4 | Report |
| 8 Nov | 12:00 | Lithuania | 1-2 | Spain | 3-8 | 4-3 | 1-2 | 8-13 | Report |

=== 3rd place match ===
| Date | Time | | Score | | Set 1 | Set 2 | Set 3 | Total | Report |
|---|---|---|---|---|---|---|---|---|---|
| 8 Nov | 16:00 | Lithuania | 1-2 | Turkey | 9-5 | 1-4 | 4-8 | 14-17 | Report |

=== Final ===
| Date | Time | | Score | | Set 1 | Set 2 | Set 3 | Total | Report |
|---|---|---|---|---|---|---|---|---|---|
| 8 Nov | 17:45 | France | 2-0 | Spain | 9-1 | 7-0 | | 16-1 | Report |

== Final standings ==
| Pos | Team |
|---|---|
| Gold medal | France |
| Silver medal | Spain |
| Bronze medal | Turkey |
| 4 | Lithuania |
| 5 | Italy |
| 6 | Romania |
| 7 | Denmark |
| 8 | Belgium |
| 9 | Netherlands |
| 10 | Estonia |
| 11 | Bulgaria |
| 12 | Moldova |
| 13 | Ukraine |
| 14 | Croatia |
| 14 | Poland |
| | Source: |
