= Austrian Baseball Softball Federation =

Austrian national sports governing body

- Sport: Baseball
- Jurisdiction: Austria
- Abbreviation: ABF
- Founded: 1983
- Affiliation: WBSC
- Regional affiliation: WBSC Europe
- Headquarters: Vienna, Austria
- President: Rainer Husty

Official website
- www.baseballsoftball.at
- (Austria)

The Austrian Baseball Softball Federation (ABF) is the national governing body of baseball and softball in Austria. The federation was established in 1983. As of 2024, the ABF has 47 affiliated clubs and a membership of more than 5000 athletes.

The ABF is responsible for the Austria national baseball team and the Austria women's national softball team, Austrian baseball and softball youth teams, and overseeing the Austrian Baseball Bundesliga, the highest level of baseball in the country.

== History ==
Baseball in Austria has its origins in the 1940s and 1950s, when United States soldiers played the sport during the Allied occupation in Vienna and Tulln an der Donau. However, baseball practice ended after the Allies left Austria in 1955.

The first baseball clubs were established in the early 1980s and the Austrian Baseball Softball Federation, initially called Austrian Baseball and Softball Association (Österreichischer Baseball und Softball Verband), was established in 1983. The first Austrian baseball championship took place in 1984 with four teams from Vienna and Linz.

In 1992, the ABF organized the first softball championship and in 1994, the Austrian national softball team participated in the 1994 Women's Softball World Championship, where they finished with a 0–6 record.

In 2021, the ABF changed its name from Austrian Baseball Federation to Austrian Baseball Softball Federation.

== Teams ==
The Austrian Baseball Softball Federation oversees the development of the following national baseball and softball teams:

Baseball

- Austria national baseball team
- Austria national under-23 baseball team
- Austria national under-18 baseball team
- Austria national under-15 baseball team
- Austria national under-12 baseball team

Softball

- Austria women's national softball team
- Austria women's national under-22 baseball team
- Austria women's national under-18 baseball team
