= France national Baseball5 team =

France

Information
- Country: France
- Federation: French Federation of Baseball and Softball
- Confederation: WBSC Europe
- Manager: (France) Lahcène Benhamida

WBSC ranking
- Current: 3 (31 December 2025)
- Highest: 1 (November 2023)
- Lowest: 3 (August 2023)

Baseball5 World Cup
- Appearances: 2 (first in 2022)
- Best result: (bronze) 3rd (1 time, in 2024)

Baseball5 European Championship
- Appearances: 2 (first in 2020)
- Best result: (gold) 1st (2 times, most recent in 2025)

The France national Baseball5 team represents France in international Baseball5 competitions.

== History ==
France participated in the first Baseball5 European Championship played in Vilnius and won, defeating Lithuania in the final, 2 sets to 0. As European champions, France earned one of the two European spots for the 2022 Baseball5 World Cup in Mexico City.

At the 2022 Baseball5 World Cup, France finished 9th with a 3–5 record.

France finished second in the 2023 Baseball5 European Championship losing against Lithuania 2 sets to 0, in a replay of the 2020 final.

== Current roster ==
As of 7 October 2024

No.	Pos.	Player	Gender
5	UTL	Jade Aubard Cojan	F
4	UTL	Ambre Brouard	F
7	UTL	Nathan Cregut	M
2	UTL	Lucas Dedieu	M
6	UTL	Omar Diodene Pacheco	M
3	UTL	Flavien Hasslauer	M
8	UTL	Léna Sellam	F
1	UTL	Amina Taleb	F

=== Staff ===
No.	Pos.	Name
--	Manager	Lahcène Benhamida
--	Coach	Stephen Lesfargues
--	Coach	Olivier Skenadji

== Tournament record ==
=== Baseball5 World Cup ===
Baseball5 World Cup record
Year	Round	Position	W	L	RS	RA
(Mexico) 2022	Placement round	9th	3	5	60	79
(Hong Kong) 2024	Bronze medal game	3rd	6	3	92	94
Total	2/2	–	9	8	152	173

=== Baseball5 European Championship ===
Baseball5 European Championship record
Year	Round	Position	W	L	RS	RA
(Lithuania) 2020	Final	1st	8	1	129	43
(Lithuania) 2023	Final	2nd	9	1	207	33
(Lithuania) 2025	Final	1st	6	0	149	13
Total	3/3	–	23	2	485	89
