= Baseball5 European Championship =

- Sport: Baseball5
- Founded: 2020
- No. of teams: 15 (in 2025)
- Continent: Europe
- Most recent champion: France (2nd title)
- Most titles: France (2 titles)
- 2025 Baseball5 European Championship

The Baseball5 European Championship (European Baseball5 Championship) is the main championship tournament between national Baseball5 teams in Europe, governed by the WBSC Europe. The tournament serves as qualifier for the Baseball5 World Cup, with the top two teams qualifying for the world championship. France is the most successful team, having won the championship twice.

== History ==
The first championship was held in Vilnius, Lithuania in 2020 and was contested between 14 national teams. The tournament was won by France, after defeating Lithuania in the final 2 matches to 0. Both teams qualified for the 2022 Baseball5 World Cup held in Mexico City.

The second edition of the tournament was again held in Lithuania, this time in Druskininkai, and featured 13 teams. The championship game was a replay of the 2020 final between France and Lithuania, this time won by the locals, defeating France.

== Results ==
Year	Host	Final			Third place game		
Year	Host	Champions	Score	Runners-up	Third place	Score	Fourth place
2020; Details	(Lithuania); Vilnius	France	2–0	Lithuania	Russia	2–0	Italy
2023; Details	(Lithuania); Druskininkai	Lithuania	2–0	France	Spain	2–1	Netherlands
2025; Details	(Lithuania); Panevėžys	France	2–0	Spain	Turkey	2–1	Lithuania

=== Medal table ===
Rank	Nation	Gold	Silver	Bronze	Total
1	France	2	1	0	3
2	Lithuania	1	1	0	2
3	Spain	0	1	1	2
4	Russia	0	0	1	1
4	Turkey	0	0	1	1
Totals (5 entries)		3	3	3	9

=== Participating teams ===
Teams	(Lithuania) 2020	(Lithuania) 2023	(Lithuania) 2025	Years
Belarus	6th			1
Belgium	11th	5th	8th	3
Bulgaria	9th	9th	11th	3
Croatia			14th	1
Czech Republic	12th	8th		2
Denmark			7th	1
Estonia	10th	11th	10th	3
Finland		7th		1
France	1st	2nd	1st	3
Israel	7th			1
Italy	4th	6th	5th	3
Latvia	14th	13th		2
Lithuania	2nd	1st	4th	3
Moldova	13th	12th	12th	3
Netherlands	5th	4th	9th	3
Poland			14th	1
Romania	8th	10th	6th	3
Russia	3rd			1
Spain		3rd	2nd	2
Turkey			3rd	1
Ukraine			13th	1
Total	14	13	15	

== See also ==
- Baseball5 World Cup
- Youth Baseball5 World Cup
- Baseball5 African Championship
- Baseball5 Asia Cup
- Baseball5 Pan American Championship
- European Baseball Championship
- ESF Women's Championship
- European Cup (baseball)
- Baseball awards § Europe
