= Lithuania national Baseball5 team =

Lithuania

Information
- Country: Lithuania
- Federation: Lithuanian Baseball Association
- Confederation: WBSC Europe
- Manager: Maksim Burdin

WBSC ranking
- Current: 8 (31 December 2025)

Baseball5 World Cup
- Appearances: 2 (first in 2022)
- Best result: 8th (1 time, in 2024)

Baseball5 European Championship
- Appearances: 3 (first in 2020)
- Best result: (gold) 1st (1 time, in 2023)

The Lithuania national Baseball5 team represents Lithuania in international Baseball5 competitions.

== History ==
Lithuania participated as hosts in the 2020 Baseball5 European Championship, where they reached the final, but lost to France 0 matches to 2.

As European runner-up, the Lithuanian team qualified to the inaugural Baseball5 World Cup played in Mexico City, where the team participated in the historic first game of tournament, but lost to Mexico 5–3 and 4–2. Lithuania finished the championship 11th with a 2–6 record.

Lithuania became European champions in 2023, after winning the 2023 Baseball5 European Championship defeating France 2 sets to 0, in a replay of the 2020 final.

== Current roster ==
As of 7 October 2024

No.	Pos.	Player	Gender
14	1B	Kira Baitul	F
12	SS	Deividas Baniūnas	M
1	SS	Napalis Paulius Grigas	M
77	2B	Ugne Kučinskaitė	F
7	3B	Nomeda Neverauskaitė	F
9	2B	Aistė Paškevičiūtė	F
5	P	Kristijonas Vicas	M
27	1B	Dovydas Zakaras	M

=== Staff ===
No.	Pos.	Name
--	Manager	Maksim Burdzin
--	Coach	Arvydas Birbalas

== Tournament record ==
=== Baseball5 World Cup ===
Baseball5 World Cup record
Year	Round	Position	W	L	RS	RA
(Mexico) 2022	Placement round	11th	2	6	53	81
(Hong Kong) 2024	Placement round	8th	4	4	97	98
Total	2/2	–	6	10	150	179

=== Baseball5 European Championship ===
Baseball5 European Championship record
Year	Round	Position	W	L	RS	RA
(Lithuania) 2020	Final	2nd	6	3	92	79
(Lithuania) 2023	Final	1st	8	1	155	41
(Lithuania) 2025	Semifinal	4th	4	2	124	35
Total	3/3	–	18	6	371	155
