= Armenian Baseball Federation =

Sporting Organization

Armenian Baseball Federation logo

The Armenian Baseball and Softball Federation (Armenian: Հայաստանի բեյսբոլի և սոֆտբոլի ֆեդերացիա), also known as the Armenian Baseball and Sօftball Federation (ABSF), is the regulating body of baseball and softball in Armenia, governed by the Armenian Olympic Committee. The headquarters of the federation is located in Yerevan.

== About ==
The Armenian Baseball and Softball Federation was officially re-registered in 2019 by ex players of Armenian national team and is currently led by president Garnik Sevoyan. Armenian baseball athletes participate in various international and European level baseball championships. The Federation also hosts national baseball competitions and manages the Armenia national baseball team. The Federation is a full member of the World Baseball Softball Confederation, WBSC Europe, and the International Softball Federation.

== See also ==
- Sport in Armenia
