= 2026 U-15 Women's Softball European Championship =

Tournament details
- Host country: Netherlands
- Dates: 27 July – 1 August 2026
- Teams: 14
- Defending champions: Czech Republic (2024)

Final positions
- Champions: Italy
- Runner-up: Czech Republic
- Third place: Netherlands
- Fourth place: Spain

Tournament statistics
- Games played: 43

The 2026 U-15 Women's Softball European Championship was the 13th edition of the U-15 Women's Softball European Championship, organised by Europe's governing baseball body, the WBSC Europe. The tournament was held in Rosmalen, Netherlands from 27 July to 1 August 2026. The top two teams of the tournament will qualify for the 2027 U-15 Women's Softball World Cup.

Italy defeated Czech Republic 5–0 to win the championship. Italy and Czech Republic have qualified for the 2027 U-15 Women's Softball World Cup.

== Participating teams ==
- Austria
- Belgium
- Croatia
- Czech Republic
- France
- Germany
- Great Britain
- Israel
- Italy
- Netherlands
- Poland
- Spain
- Turkey
- Ukraine

== Opening round ==
=== Group A ===
Pos	Team	Pld	W	L	RF	RA	RD	PCT	GB	Qualification
1	Czech Republic	2	2	0	35	0	+35	1.000	—	Advance to Group F
2	Turkey	2	1	1	4	17	−13	.500	1	Advance to Group G
3	Austria	2	0	2	2	24	−22	.000	2	Advance to Group H

Source: WBSC Europe

Date	Local time	Road team	Score	Home team	Inn.	Venue	Game duration	Attendance	Boxscore
Jul 27, 2026	14:30	Turkey	0–15	Czech Republic	3	Sportpark De Groote Wielen - Field2	1:22	67	Boxscore
Jul 28, 2026	12:00	Austria	2–4	Turkey	6	Sportpark De Groote Wielen	1:33	52	Boxscore
Jul 28, 2026	17:00	Czech Republic	20–0	Austria	3	Sportpark De Groote Wielen	1:13	81	Boxscore

=== Group B ===
Pos	Team	Pld	W	L	RF	RA	RD	PCT	GB	Qualification
1	Italy	2	2	0	46	0	+46	1.000	—	Advance to Group F
2	Israel	2	1	1	5	16	−11	.500	1	Advance to Group G
3	Belgium	2	0	2	1	36	−35	.000	2	Advance to Group H

Source: WBSC Europe

Date	Local time	Road team	Score	Home team	Inn.	Venue	Game duration	Attendance	Boxscore
Jul 27, 2026	12:00	Italy	31–0	Belgium	3	Sportpark De Groote Wielen - Field2	1:30	119	Boxscore
Jul 28, 2026	9:30	Israel	0–15	Italy	3	Sportpark De Groote Wielen	1:16	65	Boxscore
Jul 28, 2026	14:30	Belgium	1–5	Israel	6	Sportpark De Groote Wielen	1:37	112	Boxscore

=== Group C ===
Pos	Team	Pld	W	L	RF	RA	RD	PCT	GB	Qualification
1	Spain	2	2	0	13	6	+7	1.000	—	Advance to Group F
2	Poland	2	1	1	12	15	−3	.500	1	Advance to Group G
3	Croatia	2	0	2	11	15	−4	.000	2	Advance to Group H

Source: WBSC Europe

Date	Local time	Road team	Score	Home team	Inn.	Venue	Game duration	Attendance	Boxscore
Jul 27, 2026	10:00	Spain	6–3	Croatia	6	Sportpark De Groote Wielen	1:48	32	Boxscore
Jul 27, 2026	15:00	Poland	3–7	Spain	6	Sportpark De Groote Wielen	1:48	65	Boxscore
Jul 28, 2026	10:00	Croatia	8–9	Poland	6	Sportpark De Groote Wielen - Field2	1:42	30	Boxscore

=== Group D ===
Pos	Team	Pld	W	L	RF	RA	RD	PCT	GB	Qualification
1	Netherlands	2	2	0	24	2	+22	1.000	—	Advance to Group F
2	Great Britain	2	1	1	16	15	+1	.500	1	Advance to Group G
3	France	2	0	2	2	25	−23	.000	2	Advance to Group H

Source: WBSC Europe

Date	Local time	Road team	Score	Home team	Inn.	Venue	Game duration	Attendance	Boxscore
Jul 27, 2026	9:30	Great Britain	14–2	France	4	Sportpark De Groote Wielen - Field2	1:37	63	Boxscore
Jul 27, 2026	19:00	Netherlands	13–2	Great Britain	6	Sportpark De Groote Wielen	1:56	310	Boxscore
Jul 28, 2026	19:30	France	0–11	Netherlands	4	Sportpark De Groote Wielen	1:20	113	Boxscore

=== Group E ===
Pos	Team	Pld	W	L	RF	RA	RD	PCT	GB	Qualification
1	Germany	1	1	0	6	2	+4	1.000	—	Advance to Group F
2	Ukraine	1	0	1	2	6	−4	.000	1	Advance to Group G

Source: WBSC Europe

Date	Local time	Road team	Score	Home team	Inn.	Venue	Game duration	Attendance	Boxscore
Jul 27, 2026	12:30	Germany	6–2	Ukraine	6	Sportpark De Groote Wielen	2:02	83	Boxscore

== Placement round ==
=== Group H ===
Pos	Team	Pld	W	L	RF	RA	RD	PCT	GB	Qualification
1	Croatia	3	3	0	43	16	+27	1.000	—	Advance to Eleventh place match
2	Austria	3	2	1	47	21	+26	.667	1	Advance to Eleventh place match
3	France	3	1	2	22	31	−9	.333	2	Advance to 13th place match
4	Belgium	3	0	3	9	53	−44	.000	3	Advance to 13th place match

Source: WBSC Europe

Date	Local time	Road team	Score	Home team	Inn.	Venue	Game duration	Attendance	Boxscore
Jul 29, 2026	10:00	Austria	17–0	Belgium	3	Sportpark De Groote Wielen - Field2	1:25	65	Boxscore
Jul 29, 2026	19:30	Croatia	8–0	France	5	Sportpark De Groote Wielen	1:45	68	Boxscore
Jul 30, 2026	12:00	Croatia	19–15	Austria	5	Sportpark De Groote Wielen	2:04	51	Boxscore
Jul 30, 2026	15:00	France	20–8	Belgium	5	Sportpark De Groote Wielen - Field2			Boxscore
Jul 31, 2026	9:30	Belgium	1–16	Croatia	3	Sportpark De Groote Wielen	1:10	47	Boxscore
Jul 31, 2026	10:00	Austria	15–2	France	5	Sportpark De Groote Wielen - Field2	1:58	64	Boxscore

=== 13th place match ===
Date	Local time	Road team	Score	Home team	Inn.	Venue	Game duration	Attendance	Boxscore
Aug 1, 2026	11:30	Belgium	4–5	France	6	Sportpark De Groote Wielen	1:35	92	Boxscore

=== Eleventh place match ===
Date	Local time	Road team	Score	Home team	Inn.	Venue	Game duration	Attendance	Boxscore
Aug 1, 2026	14:00	Austria	7–9	Croatia	4	Sportpark De Groote Wielen	1:44	31	Boxscore

=== Group G ===
Pos	Team	Pld	W	L	RF	RA	RD	PCT	GB	Qualification
1	Poland	4	4	0	28	11	+17	1.000	—	Rank 6
2	Ukraine	4	3	1	22	10	+12	.750	1	Rank 7
3	Great Britain	4	2	2	19	25	−6	.500	2	Rank 8
4	Israel	4	1	3	10	17	−7	.250	3	Rank 9
5	Turkey	4	0	4	12	28	−16	.000	4	Rank 10

Source: WBSC Europe

Date	Local time	Road team	Score	Home team	Inn.	Venue	Game duration	Attendance	Boxscore
Jul 29, 2026	9:30	Poland	11–3	Great Britain	5	Sportpark De Groote Wielen	1:30	54	Boxscore
Jul 29, 2026	12:30	Ukraine	5–0	Turkey	6	Sportpark De Groote Wielen - Field2	1:27	29	Boxscore
Jul 29, 2026	14:30	Israel	2–3	Poland	6	Sportpark De Groote Wielen	1:14	38	Boxscore
Jul 29, 2026	17:30	Turkey	8–10	Great Britain	6	Sportpark De Groote Wielen - Field2	1:38	47	Boxscore
Jul 30, 2026	9:30	Israel	2–9	Ukraine	5	Sportpark De Groote Wielen	1:29	32	Boxscore
Jul 30, 2026	12:30	Poland	9–2	Turkey	6	Sportpark De Groote Wielen - Field2	1:39	32	Boxscore
Jul 30, 2026	17:55	Great Britain	3–2	Israel	6	Sportpark De Groote Wielen - Field2	1:29	69	Boxscore
Jul 31, 2026	14:30	Turkey	2–4	Israel	6	Sportpark De Groote Wielen	1:32	64	Boxscore
Jul 31, 2026	15:00	Ukraine	4–5	Poland	6	Sportpark De Groote Wielen - Field2	1:44	71	Boxscore
Jul 31, 2026	19:30	Great Britain	3–4	Ukraine	6	Sportpark De Groote Wielen	1:19	53	Boxscore

== Super round ==
=== Group F ===
Pos	Team	Pld	W	L	RF	RA	RD	PCT	GB	Qualification
1	Italy	4	4	0	39	21	+18	1.000	—	Advance to Fianl
2	Czech Republic	4	3	1	22	12	+10	.750	1	Advance to Fianl
3	Spain	4	2	2	24	24	0	.500	2	Advance to Third place match
4	Netherlands	4	1	3	10	28	−18	.250	3	Advance to Third place match
5	Germany	4	0	4	16	26	−10	.000	4	Rank 5

Source: WBSC Europe

Date	Local time	Road team	Score	Home team	Inn.	Venue	Game duration	Attendance	Boxscore
Jul 29, 2026	12:00	Netherlands	6–3	Germany	5	Sportpark De Groote Wielen	1:49	210	Boxscore
Jul 29, 2026	15:00	Italy	11–3	Spain	5	Sportpark De Groote Wielen - Field2	1:56	43	Boxscore
Jul 29, 2026	17:00	Germany	1–4	Czech Republic	6	Sportpark De Groote Wielen	1:30	77	Boxscore
Jul 30, 2026	14:30	Czech Republic	9–10	Italy	5	Sportpark De Groote Wielen	2:19	122	Boxscore
Jul 30, 2026	17:00	Germany	4–6	Spain	6	Sportpark De Groote Wielen	1:40	102	Boxscore
Jul 30, 2026	19:30	Czech Republic	2–1	Netherlands	6	Sportpark De Groote Wielen	1:40	214	Boxscore
Jul 31, 2026	12:00	Netherlands	1–8	Italy	5	Sportpark De Groote Wielen	1:42	171	Boxscore
Jul 31, 2026	12:30	Spain	0–7	Czech Republic	5	Sportpark De Groote Wielen - Field2	1:25	54	Boxscore
Jul 31, 2026	17:00	Spain	15–2	Netherlands	4	Sportpark De Groote Wielen	1:58	152	Boxscore
Jul 31, 2026	17:30	Italy	10–8	Germany	5	Sportpark De Groote Wielen - Field2	2:02	77	Boxscore

== Finals ==
=== 3rd place match ===
Date	Local time	Road team	Score	Home team	Inn.	Venue	Game duration	Attendance	Boxscore
Aug 1, 2026	17:00	Netherlands	13–0	Spain	4	Sportpark De Groote Wielen	1:20	184	Boxscore

=== Final ===
Date	Local time	Road team	Score	Home team	Inn.	Venue	Game duration	Attendance	Boxscore
Aug 1, 2026	19:30	Czech Republic	0–5	Italy	6	Sportpark De Groote Wielen	1:49	234	Boxscore

== Final standing ==
Rank	Team
1st place, gold medalist(s)	Italy
2nd place, silver medalist(s)	Czech Republic
3rd place, bronze medalist(s)	Netherlands
4	Spain
5	Germany
6	Poland
7	Ukraine
8	Great Britain
9	Israel
10	Turkey
11	Croatia
12	Austria
13	France
14	Belgium

Qualified for the 2027 U-15 World Cup

== External websites ==
- Official website
