= ESF Junior Boys Championship =

- Sport: Softball
- Founded: 1998
- No. of teams: 5 (in 2026)
- Continent: Europe
- Most recent champion: Czech Republic (7th title)
- Most titles: Czech Republic (7 titles)

The European Softball Junior Boys Championship (U-18) is the main championship tournament between national junior boys softball teams in Europe, governed by the WBSC Europe.

== Results ==
Year	Host	Final		Semifinalists	
Year	Host	Champions	Runners-up	3rd place	4th place
1998	(Czech Republic); Prague	Czech Republic	Denmark	Netherlands	Israel
2000	(Netherlands); Enschede	Czech Republic	Netherlands	Israel	Denmark
2002	(Czech Republic); Kostelec	Czech Republic	Denmark	Israel	Great Britain
2004	(France); Roissy	Denmark	Czech Republic	France	Israel
2006	(Czech Republic); Havlíčkův Brod	Czech Republic	Denmark	Slovakia	Israel
2009	(Czech Republic); Ledenice	Denmark	Czech Republic	Israel	Croatia
2011	(Czech Republic); Kostelec	Czech Republic	Denmark	Croatia	Great Britain
2013	(Denmark); Stenløse	Czech Republic	Denmark	Croatia	Israel
2015	(Czech Republic); Most	Czech Republic	Denmark	Croatia	Israel
2017	(Czech Republic); Prague	Czech Republic	Denmark	Israel	Croatia
2021	(Czech Republic); Havlíčkův Brod	Czech Republic	Denmark	Israel	Croatia
2023	(Czech Republic); Sezimovo Ústí	Czech Republic	Israel	Denmark	Great Britain
2026	(Czech Republic); Břeclav	Czech Republic	Lithuania	Israel	Denmark

=== Medal table ===
Rank	Nation	Gold	Silver	Bronze	Total
1	Czech Republic	11	2	0	13
2	Denmark	2	8	1	11
3	Israel	0	1	6	7
4	Netherlands	0	1	1	2
5	Lithuania	0	1	0	1
6	Croatia	0	0	3	3
7	France	0	0	1	1
7	Slovakia	0	0	1	1
Totals (8 entries)		13	13	13	39

=== U-23 Men Softball ===
The inaugural U-23 Men's Softball European Championship will take place in July 2022, as a qualifier for the WBSC U-23 Men's Softball World Cup.

1. 2022 Host : CZE - 1- Czech Republic 2- Denmark 3- Israel

=== U-16 Men Softball ===
U-16 Men's Softball European Championship - Past Results

Past results of the U-16 Men's Softball European Championship since the first one in Prague, Czech Republic, in 2017.

II. Havlíčkův Brod (CZE) - 2021 July 12 - 17 (game results) 1. CZECH REPUBLIC (CZE) 2. ISRAEL (ISR) 3. DENMARK (DEN)

I. Prague (CZE) - 2017 July 24 - 29 (game results) 1. CZECH REPUBLIC (CZE) 2. ISRAEL (ISR) 3. DENMARK (DEN) 4. CROATIA (CRO)

Permalink: https://www.wbsceurope.org/en/organisation/softball/softball-past-results/national-teams-competitions/u-16-mech-past-results

=== U17 Baseball5 ===
The first-ever U17 Baseball5 European Championship will kick off on November 16, 2022 in Sofia, Bulgaria.

1. France - Turkey - Lithuania

=== Men's Slowpitch European Championship - Past Results ===
Past results of the Men's Slowpitch European Championship since the first one in Choceň, Czech Republic, in 2018.

II. Colorno (ITA) - 2022 June 14 - 18 (game results) 1. GREAT BRITAIN (GBR) 2. NETHERLANDS (NED) 3. GERMANY (GER) 4. IRELAND (IRL) 5. BELGIUM (BEL) 5. ITALY (ITA)

I. Choceň (CZE) - 2018 June 12 - 16 (game results) 1. GREAT BRITAIN (GBR) 2. GERMANY (GER) 3. NETHERLANDS (NED) 4. CZECH REPUBLIC (CZE) 5. ITALY 6. BELGIUM 7. IRELAND

== See also ==
- ESF Women's Championship
- ESF Junior Girls Championship
