= Armenia national baseball team =

Information
- Country: Armenia
- Federation: Armenian Baseball Federation
- Confederation: WBSC Europe

WBSC ranking
- Current: NR (31 December 2025)

The Armenian national baseball team (Armenian: Բեյսբոլի Հայաստանի ազգային հավաքական) is the national baseball team of Armenia. The team represents Armenia in international baseball competitions.

The team is managed by the Armenian Baseball Federation, which is a member of the Confederation of European Baseball. The team has not qualified to play in the European Baseball Championship.

== See also ==
- Sport in Armenia
