= European Men's U21 Baseball Championship =

International baseball tournament

- Most recent season or competition: 2016 European Under-21 Baseball Championship
- Sport: Baseball
- Founded: 2006
- Folded: 2016
- No. of teams: 8 (in 2012)
- Continent: Europe
- Last champions: Ukraine (1st title)
- Most titles: Czech Republic (2 titles)

The European Under-21 Baseball Championship was a bi-annual international baseball tournament sanctioned and created by the Confederation of European Baseball (CEB).

== Results ==
Year	Final Host	Final			Semifinalists	
Year	Final Host	Champions	Score	Runners-up	3rd place	4th place
2006; Details	(Italy); Friuli	Russia	16–9	France	Italy	Ukraine
2008; Details	(Spain); Pamplona	Spain	11–2	Italy	Germany	Czech Republic
2010; Details	(Czech Republic); Brno	Czech Republic	7–2	Russia	France	Ukraine
2012; Details	(Czech Republic); Brno	France	12–1 (F/7)	Ukraine	Czech Republic	Russia
2014; Details	(Czech Republic); Třebíč	Czech Republic	9–3	Austria	Russia	Ukraine
2016; Details	(Israel); Tel Aviv	Ukraine	7–5	Russia	Lithuania	Israel

== Medal table ==
Rank	Nation	Gold	Silver	Bronze	Total
1	Czech Republic	2	0	1	3
2	Russia	1	2	1	4
3	France	1	1	1	3
4	Ukraine	1	1	0	2
5	Spain	1	0	0	1
6	Italy	0	1	1	2
7	Austria	0	1	0	1
8	Germany	0	0	1	1
8	Lithuania	0	0	1	1
Totals (9 entries)		6	6	6	18

== See also ==
- European Baseball Championship
- European Junior Baseball Championship
- European Youth Baseball Championship
