= Portuguese Baseball and Softball Federation =

- Sport: Baseball and softball
- Jurisdiction: Portugal
- Abbreviation: FPBS
- Founded: 1996
- Affiliation: WBSC
- Regional affiliation: WBSC Europe
- Headquarters: Abrantes, Portugal
- President: Dra. Sandra Monteiro
- Coach: Nus Jurgens
- (Portugal)

The Portuguese Baseball and Softball Federation (FPBS), is the federation that guides the competitions of baseball and softball in Portugal, with headquarters in Abrantes. It was founded in 1993, but not legally established until February 23, 1996. The influential multi-sport Associação Académica de Coimbra had already formed its baseball team in 1994.

== Teams ==
The Portuguese Baseball and Softball Federation oversees the development of the following national baseball and softball teams:

Baseball

- Portugal national baseball team
- Portugal women's national baseball team

Softball

- Portugal men's national softball team
- Portugal women's national softball team

Other sports

- Portugal national Baseball5 team
