= 2026 U-22 Women's Softball European Championship =

Tournament details
- Host countries: Czechia; Poland
- Dates: 20 – 25 July 2026
- Teams: 19
- Defending champions: Netherlands (2024)

Final positions
- Champions: Italy (4th title)
- Runner-up: Czech Republic
- Third place: Netherlands
- Fourth place: France

Tournament statistics
- Games played: 74

The 2026 U-22 Women's Softball European Championship was the 9th edition of the U-22 Women's Softball European Championship, organised by Europe's governing baseball body, the WBSC Europe. The tournament was held in Puruba, Czech Republic and Żory,Poland from 20 to 25 July 2026.

Italy defeated the Czech Republic 2–0 to claim the championship. Italy won the championship for the first time in four years. The Czech Republic also finished as runners-up for the first time in four years.

== Participating teams ==
- Austria
- Belgium
- Croatia
- Czech Republic
- Denmark
- France
- Germany
- Greece
- Ireland
- Israel
- Italy
- Netherlands
- Poland
- Slovakia
- Spain
- Sweden
- Switzerland
- Turkey
- Ukraine

== Opening round ==
=== Group A ===
Pos	Team	Pld	W	L	RF	RA	RD	PCT	GB	Qualification
1	Austria	2	2	0	18	4	+14	1.000	—	Advance to Group X
2	Greece	2	1	1	6	8	−2	.500	1	Advance to 13–16th places classification
3	Sweden	2	0	2	8	20	−12	.000	2	Advance to 17–19th places classification

Source: WBSC Europe

Date	Local time	Road team	Score	Home team	Inn.	Venue	Game duration	Attendance	Boxscore
Jul 20, 2026	9:00	Sweden	4–14	Austria	4	Arrows Park Ostrava Field 1	1:37	167	Boxscore
Jul 20, 2026	12:00	Greece	6–4	Sweden	7	Arrows Park Ostrava Field 1	1:52	204	Boxscore
Jul 20, 2026	17:00	Austria	4–0	Greece	7	Arrows Park Ostrava Field 1	1:56	120	Boxscore

=== Group B ===
Pos	Team	Pld	W	L	RF	RA	RD	PCT	GB	Qualification
1	Spain	2	2	0	24	2	+22	1.000	—	Advance to Group Y
2	Croatia	2	1	1	13	10	+3	.500	1	Advance to 13–16th places classification
3	Slovakia	2	0	2	3	28	−25	.000	2	Advance to 17–19th places classification

Source: WBSC Europe

Date	Local time	Road team	Score	Home team	Inn.	Venue	Game duration	Attendance	Boxscore
Jul 20, 2026	9:30	Slovakia	2–12	Croatia	4	Arrows Park Ostrava Field 2	1:21	30	Boxscore
Jul 20, 2026	12:30	Spain	16–1	Slovakia	3	Arrows Park Ostrava Field 2	1:20	78	Boxscore
Jul 20, 2026	17:30	Croatia	1–8	Spain	6	Arrows Park Ostrava Field 2		33	Boxscore

=== Group C ===
Pos	Team	Pld	W	L	RF	RA	RD	PCT	GB	Qualification
1	Belgium	1	1	0	14	1	+13	1.000	—	Advance to Group Y
2	Denmark	1	0	1	1	14	−13	.000	1	Advance to 13–16th places classification

Source: WBSC Europe

Date	Local time	Road team	Score	Home team	Inn.	Venue	Game duration	Attendance	Boxscore
Jul 20, 2026	9:30	Belgium	14–1	Denmark	5	Arrows Park Ostrava Field 3	1:54	46	Boxscore

=== Group D ===
Pos	Team	Pld	W	L	RF	RA	RD	PCT	GB	Qualification
1	Poland	2	2	0	29	8	+21	1.000	—	Advance to Group X
2	Switzerland	2	1	1	22	21	+1	.500	1	Advance to 13–16th places classification
3	Turkey	2	0	2	1	23	−22	.000	2	Advance to 17–19th places classification

Source: WBSC Europe

Date	Local time	Road team	Score	Home team	Inn.	Venue	Game duration	Attendance	Boxscore
Jul 20, 2026	10:00	Turkey	1–8	Poland	5	Gepardy Zory	1:11	60	Boxscore
Jul 20, 2026	13:00	Switzerland	15–0	Turkey	4	Gepardy Zory	1:41	50	Boxscore
Jul 20, 2026	16:00	Poland	21–7	Switzerland	5	Gepardy Zory	1:59	50	Boxscore

=== Group X ===
Pos	Team	Pld	W	L	RF	RA	RD	PCT	GB	Qualification
1	Netherlands	5	5	0	51	4	+47	1.000	—	Advance to Group Z
2	France	5	4	1	27	28	−1	.800	1	Advance to Group Z
3	Israel	5	3	2	45	24	+21	.600	2	Advance to Group Z
4	Austria	5	1	4	27	35	−8	.200	4	Advance to Group E
5	Ukraine	5	1	4	8	33	−25	.200	4	Advance to Group E
6	Poland	5	1	4	15	49	−34	.200	4	Advance to Group E

Source: WBSC Europe

Date	Local time	Road team	Score	Home team	Inn.	Venue	Game duration	Attendance	Boxscore
Jul 20, 2026	14:30	Netherlands	9–1	Ukraine	5	Arrows Park Ostrava Field 1	2:15	59	Boxscore
Jul 20, 2026	15:00	France	7–5	Israel	7	Arrows Park Ostrava Field 2	2:31	63	Boxscore
Jul 21, 2026	9:00	Ukraine	0–7	France	5	Arrows Park Ostrava Field 1			Boxscore
Jul 21, 2026	9:30	Israel	2–6	Netherlands	7	Arrows Park Ostrava Field 2	1:49	60	Boxscore
Jul 21, 2026	11:30	Austria	11–6	Poland	7	Arrows Park Ostrava Field 1	2:30	50	Boxscore
Jul 21, 2026	14:00	Israel	11–0	Ukraine	5	Arrows Park Ostrava Field 1	1:53	48	Boxscore
Jul 21, 2026	16:30	Austria	0–7	Netherlands	5	Arrows Park Ostrava Field 1	1:47	70	Boxscore
Jul 21, 2026	17:00	Poland	1–4	France	7	Arrows Park Ostrava Field 2	1:41	50	Boxscore
Jul 22, 2026	11:30	Netherlands	14–0	Poland	4	Arrows Park Ostrava Field 1	1:15	75	Boxscore
Jul 22, 2026	12:00	France	8–7	Austria	8	Arrows Park Ostrava Field 2	2:52	74	Boxscore
Jul 22, 2026	16:30	Poland	5–2	Ukraine	7	Arrows Park Ostrava Field 1	1:51	60	Boxscore
Jul 22, 2026	17:00	Austria	8–9	Israel	7	Arrows Park Ostrava Field 2	2:49	95	Boxscore
Jul 22, 2026	19:30	Netherlands	15–1	France	5	Arrows Park Ostrava Field 2	1:29	65	Boxscore
Jul 23, 2026	9:00	Ukraine	5–1	Austria	5	Arrows Park Ostrava Field 2	2:29	15	Boxscore
Jul 23, 2026	9:00	Israel	18–3	Poland	3	Gepardy Zory	1:12	51	Boxscore

=== Group Y ===
Pos	Team	Pld	W	L	RF	RA	RD	PCT	GB	Qualification
1	Italy	5	5	0	57	11	+46	1.000	—	Advance to Group Z
2	Czech Republic (H)	5	4	1	32	6	+26	.800	1	Advance to Group Z
3	Spain	5	3	2	41	21	+20	.600	2	Advance to Group Z
4	Germany	5	2	3	28	15	+13	.400	3	Advance to Group E
5	Belgium	5	1	4	17	72	−55	.200	4	Advance to Group E
6	Ireland	5	0	5	16	66	−50	.000	5	Advance to Group E

Source: WBSC Europe
(H) Hosts

Date	Local time	Road team	Score	Home team	Inn.	Venue	Game duration	Attendance	Boxscore
Jul 20, 2026	20:30	Germany	0–2	Czech Republic	7	Arrows Park Ostrava Field 1	1:42	400	Boxscore
Jul 20, 2026	20:30	Ireland	0–19	Italy	3	Arrows Park Ostrava Field 2	1:01	60	Boxscore
Jul 21, 2026	10:00	Belgium	0–13	Germany	4	Arrows Park Ostrava Field 3	1:24	57	Boxscore
Jul 21, 2026	12:00	Czech Republic	6–0	Spain	7	Arrows Park Ostrava Field 2	2:03	80	Boxscore
Jul 21, 2026	14:30	Italy	15–0	Belgium	4	Arrows Park Ostrava Field 2	1:22	80	Boxscore
Jul 21, 2026	19:00	Czech Republic	12–1	Ireland	4	Arrows Park Ostrava Field 1	1:27	158	Boxscore
Jul 21, 2026	19:30	Spain	5–9	Italy	7	Arrows Park Ostrava Field 2	2:14	95	Boxscore
Jul 22, 2026	9:00	Spain	11–4	Ireland	7	Arrows Park Ostrava Field 1	2:36	60	Boxscore
Jul 22, 2026	9:30	Belgium	1–11	Czech Republic	4	Arrows Park Ostrava Field 2	1:16	78	Boxscore
Jul 22, 2026	9:30	Italy	10–5	Germany	7	Arrows Park Ostrava Field 3	2:02	58	Boxscore
Jul 22, 2026	14:00	Ireland	0–9	Germany	5	Arrows Park Ostrava Field 1	1:16	68	Boxscore
Jul 22, 2026	14;30	Spain	22–1	Belgium	5	Arrows Park Ostrava Field 2	2:23	76	Boxscore
Jul 22, 2026	19:00	Italy	4–1	Czech Republic	7	Arrows Park Ostrava Field 1	2:01	238	Boxscore
Jul 23, 2026	9:00	Germany	1–3	Spain	5	Arrows Park Ostrava Field 1	2:08	43	Boxscore
Jul 23, 2026	9:00	Ireland	11–15	Belgium	7	Arrows Park Ostrava Field 3	3:07	37	Boxscore

== 17–19th places classification ==
=== Group G ===
Pos	Team	Pld	W	L	RF	RA	RD	PCT	GB	Qualification
1	Sweden	4	4	0	54	9	+45	1.000	—	Rank 17
2	Slovakia	4	2	2	16	34	−18	.500	2	Rank 18
3	Turkey	4	0	4	11	38	−27	.000	4	Rank 19

Source: WBSC Europe

Date	Local time	Road team	Score	Home team	Inn.	Venue	Game duration	Attendance	Boxscore
Jul 21, 2026	15:00	Sweden	17–5	Slovakia	4	Gepardy Zory	1:49	30	Boxscore
Jul 22, 2026	10:00	Sweden	17–4	Turkey	6	Gepardy Zory	2:22	30	Boxscore
Jul 22, 2026	17:30	Turkey	4–5	Slovakia	7	Gepardy Zory	1:55	35	Boxscore
Jul 23, 2026	12:30	Turkey	0–10	Sweden	4	Gepardy Zory	0:56	52	Boxscore
Jul 24, 2026	12:30	Slovakia	0–10	Sweden	4	Gepardy Zory	1:05	38	Boxscore
Jul 24, 2026	17:30	Slovakia	6–3	Turkey	7	Gepardy Zory	1:32	24	Boxscore

== 13–16th places classification ==
=== Group F ===
Pos	Team	Pld	W	L	RF	RA	RD	PCT	GB	Qualification
1	Greece	3	3	0	40	7	+33	1.000	—	Advance to 13–14th places classification
2	Switzerland	3	2	1	34	28	+6	.667	1	Advance to 13–14th places classification
3	Croatia	3	1	2	14	30	−16	.333	2	Advance to 15–16th places classification
4	Denmark	3	0	3	6	29	−23	.000	3	Advance to 15–16th places classification

Source: WBSC Europe

Date	Local time	Road team	Score	Home team	Inn.	Venue	Game duration	Attendance	Boxscore
Jul 21, 2026	10:00	Greece	12–2	Croatia	4	Gepardy Zory	1:34	40	Boxscore
Jul 21, 2026	12:30	Denmark	5–12	Switzerland	5	Gepardy Zory	1:51	40	Boxscore
Jul 22, 2026	12:30	Greece	18–5	Switzerland	4	Gepardy Zory	1:41	30	Boxscore
Jul 22, 2026	15:00	Croatia	7–1	Denmark	7	Gepardy Zory	2:11	25	Boxscore
Jul 23, 2026	15:00	Denmark	0–10	Greece	4	Gepardy Zory	1:07	45	Boxscore
Jul 23, 2026	17:30	Switzerland	17–5	Croatia	5	Gepardy Zory	1:50	49	Boxscore

=== 15–16th places classification ===
Date	Local time	Road team	Score	Home team	Inn.	Venue	Game duration	Attendance	Boxscore
Jul 24, 2026	10:00	Denmark	6–13	Croatia	5	Gepardy Zory	1:51	45	Boxscore

=== 13–14th places classification ===
Date	Local time	Road team	Score	Home team	Inn.	Venue	Game duration	Attendance	Boxscore
Jul 24, 2026	15:00	Switzerland	5–12	Greece	5	Gepardy Zory	1:44	45	Boxscore

== 7–12th places classification ==
=== Group E ===
Matches already played between the teams of group X (X4, X5 and X6), and Group Y (Y4, Y5 and Y6) are carried over.

Pos	Team	Pld	W	L	RF	RA	RD	PCT	GB	Qualification
1	Germany	5	5	0	46	9	+37	1.000	—	Rank 7
2	Austria	5	3	2	32	26	+6	.600	2	Rank 8
3	Ukraine	5	2	3	31	32	−1	.400	3	Rank 9
4	Belgium	5	2	3	51	70	−19	.400	3	Rank 10
5	Ireland	5	2	3	31	35	−4	.400	3	Rank 11
6	Poland	5	1	4	33	52	−19	.200	4	Rank 12

Source: WBSC Europe

Date	Local time	Road team	Score	Home team	Inn.	Venue	Game duration	Attendance	Boxscore
Jul 24, 2026	9:30	Ireland	4–6	Austria	7	Arrows Park Ostrava Field 2	2:14	30	Boxscore
Jul 24, 2026	12:00	Ukraine	14–7	Belgium	7	Arrows Park Ostrava Field 3	2:29	68	Boxscore
Jul 24, 2026	12:00	Poland	2–9	Germany	6	Arrows Park Ostrava Field 2	1:51	40	Boxscore
Jul 24, 2026	17:00	Belgium	8–12	Austria	7	Arrows Park Ostrava Field 2	3:00	85	Boxscore
Jul 24, 2026	17:00	Poland	0–9	Ireland	5	Arrows Park Ostrava Field 3	1:03	82	Boxscore
Jul 24, 2026	19:30	Ukraine	5–12	Germany	5	Arrows Park Ostrava Field 2	1:47	48	Boxscore
Jul 25, 2026	9:30	Poland	20–21	Belgium	8	Arrows Park Ostrava Field 1	3:29	99	Boxscore
Jul 25, 2026	10:00	Austria	2–3	Germany	7	Arrows Park Ostrava Field 2	1:58	43	Boxscore
Jul 25, 2026	10:30	Ireland	7–5	Ukraine	7	Arrows Park Ostrava Field 3	2:01	35	Boxscore

== Super Round ==
=== Group Z ===
Matches already played between the teams of group X (X1, X2 and X3), and Group Y (Y1, Y2 and Y3) are carried over.

Pos	Team	Pld	W	L	RF	RA	RD	PCT	GB	Qualification
1	Italy	5	5	0	32	14	+18	1.000	—	Advance to Fianl
2	Czech Republic	5	4	1	28	5	+23	.800	1	Advance to Fianl
3	Netherlands	5	3	2	40	14	+26	.600	2	Advance to 3rd place match
4	France	5	2	3	11	35	−24	.400	3	Advance to 3rd place match
5	Spain	5	1	4	17	31	−14	.200	4	Rank 5
6	Israel	5	0	5	10	39	−29	.000	5	Rank 6

Source: WBSC Europe

Date	Local time	Road team	Score	Home team	Inn.	Venue	Game duration	Attendance	Boxscore
Jul 23, 2026	16:00	Israel	1–8	Italy	6	Arrows Park Ostrava Field 1	1:51	58	Boxscore
Jul 23, 2026	16:00	Spain	0–12	Netherlands	4	Arrows Park Ostrava Field 2	1:36	54	Boxscore
Jul 23, 2026	18:30	France	0–10	Czech Republic	4	Arrows Park Ostrava Field 1	1:35	93	Boxscore
Jul 23, 2026	18:30	Italy	8–7	Netherlands	8	Arrows Park Ostrava Field 2	2:38	103	Boxscore
Jul 24, 2026	10:00	Spain	2–3	France	7	Arrows Park Ostrava Field 1	2:15	65	Boxscore
Jul 24, 2026	12:30	Israel	1–8	Czech Republic	5	Arrows Park Ostrava Field 1	1:33	101	Boxscore
Jul 24, 2026	15:00	France	0–3	Italy	7	Arrows Park Ostrava Field 1	1:29	105	Boxscore
Jul 24, 2026	17:30	Spain	10–1	Israel	5	Arrows Park Ostrava Field 1	2:01	120	Boxscore
Jul 24, 2026	20:00	Czech Republic	3–0	Netherlands	7	Arrows Park Ostrava Field 1	1:45	380	Boxscore

== Finals ==
=== 3rd place match ===
Date	Local time	Road team	Score	Home team	Inn.	Venue	Game duration	Attendance	Boxscore
Jul 25, 2026	14:00	France	0–7	Netherlands	5	Arrows Park Ostrava Field 1	1:06	450	Boxscore

=== Final ===
Date	Local time	Road team	Score	Home team	Inn.	Venue	Game duration	Attendance	Boxscore
Jul 25, 2026	16:30	Czech Republic	0–2	Italy	7	Arrows Park Ostrava Field 1	1:32	640	Boxscore

== Final standing ==
Rank	Team
1st place, gold medalist(s)	Italy
2nd place, silver medalist(s)	Czech Republic
3rd place, bronze medalist(s)	Netherlands
4	France
5	Spain
6	Israel
7	Germany
8	Austria
9	Ukraine
10	Belgium
11	Ireland
12	Poland
13	Greece
14	Switzerland
15	Croatia
16	Denmark
17	Sweden
18	Slovakia
19	Turkey

== External websites ==
- Official website
