= Finland women's national softball team =

The Finland women's national fastpitch softball team is the national team of Finland. It is governed by the Suomen Baseball ja Softball liitto.

In 2025, the top pitcher for Team Finland was Sanni Karhiaho and top batter was Erica Martin.

The first Finnish Softball League was also started in 2026 with Helsinki Sandstorm and Tampere Tigers clubs and is a key source of development for Finnish softball.

== Results ==
World Championship

Year	1990	1994	1998	2002	2006	2010	2012	2014	2016	2018	2022	2024
Standing	nc	nc	nc	nc	nc	nc	nc	nc	nc	nc	nc	nc

nc = not competed

European Championship

Year	1979	1981	1983	1984	1986	1988	1990	1992	1995	1997	1999	2001	2003	2005	2007	2009	2011	2013	2015	2017	2019	2021	2022	2024	2025
Standing	nc	nc	nc	nc	nc	6th	nc	nc	nc	nc	nc	nc	nc	20th	nc	nc	nc	nc	nc	nc	nc	nc	20th	21st	18th

nc = not competed

ESF Junior Girls Championship

Year	1991	1993	1994	1996	1998	2000	2002	2004	2006	2008	2010	2012	2014
Standing	nc	nc	nc	nc	nc	nc	nc	nc	nc	nc	nc	nc	nc

nc = not competed
