= Oslo Pretenders =

Sports club in Oslo, Norway

Oslo Pretenders Sportsklubb (Oslo Pretenders) has been the leading baseball team in Norway since 1991, winning 21 National Championships (NM) and 18 League Titles (NBL). The team has also participated in the European Cup every year between 2001-2010.

The club has in recent years expanded with a basketball team and a disc golf team.
