= Norwegian Softball and Baseball Federation =

Sports governing body in Norway

Norwegian Softball and Baseball Federation Norges Softball og Baseball Forbund
- Sport: Baseball and softball
- Jurisdiction: Norway
- Abbreviation: NSBF
- Founded: 1991
- Affiliation: WBSC
- Regional affiliation: WBSC Europe
- Headquarters: Oslo, Norway
- President: Alek Nilsen

Official website
- www.soft-baseball.no
- (Norway)

The Norwegian Softball and Baseball Federation (Norwegian: Norges Softball og Baseball Forbund or Norges Soft- og Baseball Forbund; NSBF) is the governing body for baseball and softball in Norway. It is a member of the Norwegian Olympic Committee, the Confederation of European Baseball, and the European Softball Federation. The NSBF runs two leagues in Norway, the Norsk Baseballiga 1st and 2nd divisions, as well as Norway's national baseball team and national softball team.
