= European Men's Softball Championship =

- Sport: Softball
- Founded: 1993
- No. of teams: 8 (in 2025)
- Continent: Europe
- Most recent champion: Czech Republic (13th title)
- Most titles: Czech Republic (13 titles)

The Men's Softball European Championship (formerly ESF Men's Championship) is the main championship tournament between national men's softball teams in Europe, governed by the European Softball Federation.

== Results ==
Year	Host	Final		Semifinalists	
Year	Host	Champions	Runners-up	3rd place	4th place
1993	(Czech Republic); Prague	Netherlands	Denmark	Czech Republic	Slovakia
1995	(Denmark); Hørsholm	Netherlands	Denmark	Czech Republic	Slovakia
1997	(Netherlands); Bussum	Czech Republic	Denmark	Netherlands	Israel
1999	(Czech Republic); Prague	Czech Republic	Netherlands	Denmark	Israel
2001	(Belgium); Antwerp	Czech Republic	Netherlands	Great Britain	Denmark
2003	(Czech Republic); Choceň	Netherlands	Czech Republic	Great Britain	Denmark
2005	(Netherlands); Nijmegen	Czech Republic	Denmark	Netherlands	Great Britain
2007	(Belgium); Beveren	Czech Republic	Denmark	Netherlands	Belgium
2008	(Denmark); Copenhagen	Czech Republic	Denmark	Great Britain	Netherlands
2010	(Czech Republic); Havlíčkův Brod	Denmark	Czech Republic	Great Britain	Netherlands
2012	(Netherlands); Amstelveen	Czech Republic	Netherlands	Great Britain	Denmark
2014	(Czech Republic); Havlíčkův Brod	Czech Republic	Denmark	Netherlands	Great Britain
2016	(Italy); Montegranaro	Czech Republic	Denmark	Belgium	Netherlands
2018	(Czech Republic); Havlíčkův Brod	Czech Republic	Netherlands	Denmark	Great Britain
2021	(Czech Republic); Ledenice	Czech Republic	Denmark	Croatia	France
2023	(Denmark); Hørsholm	Czech Republic	Denmark	Netherlands	Belgium
2025	(Czech Republic); Havlíčkův Brod	Czech Republic	Denmark	Belgium	Netherlands
2027	(Czech Republic); Prague				

== Medals (1993-2025) ==
Rank	Nation	Gold	Silver	Bronze	Total
1	Czech Republic	13	2	2	17
2	Netherlands	3	4	5	12
3	Denmark	1	11	2	14
4	Great Britain	0	0	5	5
5	Belgium	0	0	2	2
6	Croatia	0	0	1	1
Totals (6 entries)		17	17	17	51

== See also ==
- Women's Softball European Championship
