= 2020 Baseball5 European Championship =

Tournament details
- Country: Lithuania
- Dates: 28 February–1 March
- Teams: 14

Final positions
- Champions: France (1st title)
- Runner-up: Lithuania
- Third place: Russia
- Fourth place: Italy

The 2020 Baseball5 European Championship was an international baseball5 tournament organized by the WBSC Europe. The championship was held from 28 February to 1 March 2020, in Vilnius, Lithuania and was contested between 14 national teams.

France won the tournament, beating Lithuania in the final 2 matches to 0. Russia finished third defeating Italy 2 matches to 0 in the Bronze medal game.

== Venues ==
(Lithuania) Vilnius
Litexpo
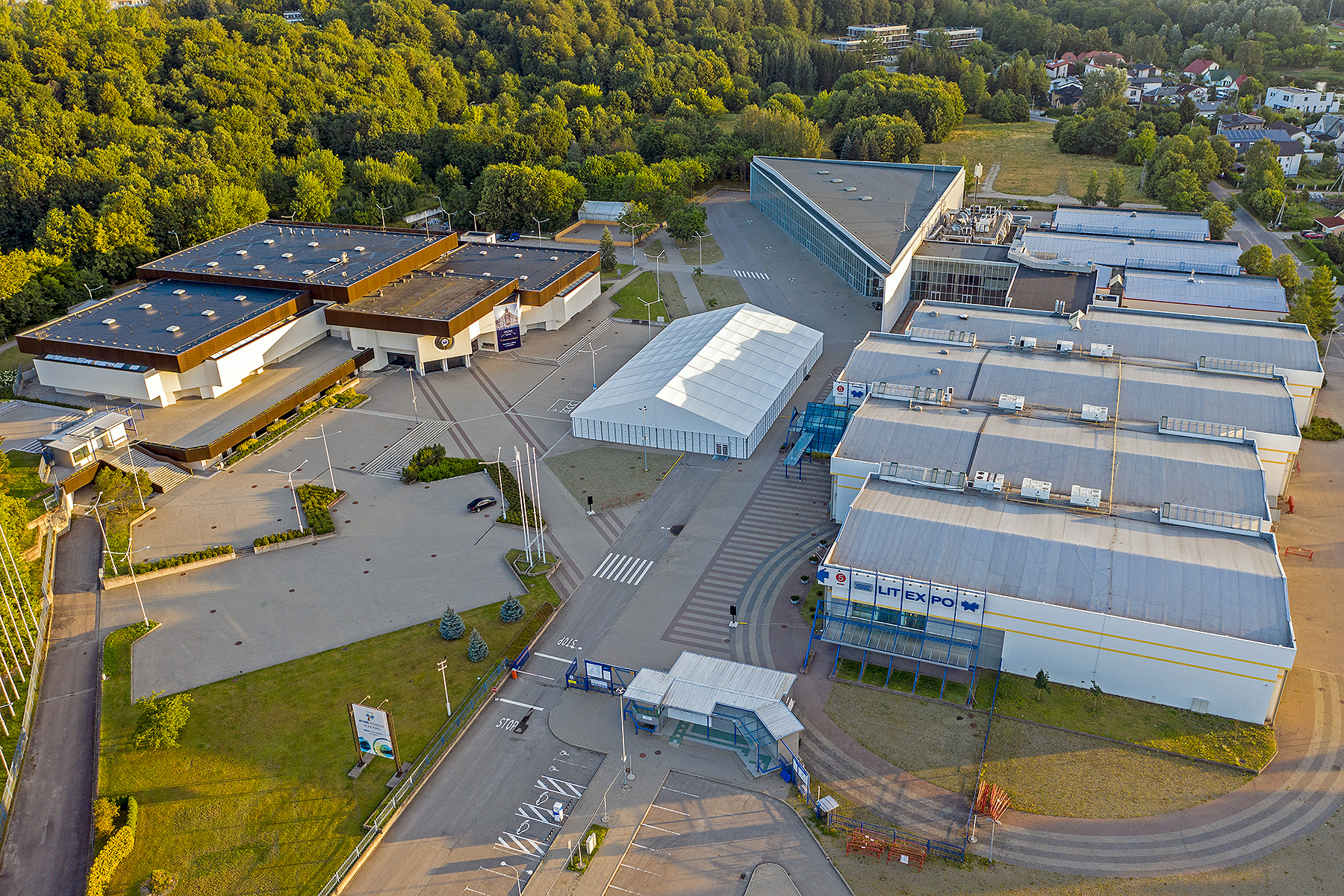

== Round 1 ==
=== Pool A ===
==== Standings ====
Qualified for Quarterfinals
Qualified for Relegation Round

Teams	W	L	R	RA
Italy	6	0	71	10
Netherlands	5	1	46	19
Belarus	3	3	28	26
Romania	3	3	26	33
Belgium	2	4	41	48
Moldova	1	5	13	50
Latvia	1	5	13	43

=== Pool B ===
==== Standings ====
Qualified for Quarterfinals
Qualified for Relegation Round

Teams	W	L	R	RA
Russia	6	0	48	9
France	5	1	68	17
Lithuania	4	2	56	36
Israel	3	3	29	29
Bulgaria	2	4	38	43
Czech Republic	1	5	26	71
Estonia	0	6	15	75

== Play-offs ==
Quarter-finals
A1	Italy	9	7
B4	Israel	3	3
B2	France	5	8
A3	Belarus	1	1
B1	Russia	10	14
A4	Romania	1	1
A2	Netherlands	6	2
B3	Lithuania	10	6

Semi-finals
A1	Italy	4	6	3
B2	France	7	2	7
B1	Russia	1	2
B3	Lithuania	6	3

Final
B2	France	20	12
B3	Lithuania	10	1
3rd Place
A1	Italy	3	0
B1	Russia	13	5

== Final standings ==
Rk	Team	Note
1st place, gold medalist(s)	France	Qualified for 2022 Baseball5 World Cup
2nd place, silver medalist(s)	Lithuania	Qualified for 2022 Baseball5 World Cup
3rd place, bronze medalist(s)	Russia	
4	Italy	
5	Netherlands	
6	Belarus	
7	Israel	
8	Romania	
9	Bulgaria	
10	Estonia	
11	Belgium	
12	Czech Republic	
13	Moldova	
14	Latvia	
