= Belgium men's national softball team =

The Belgium men's national softball team is the softball team representing Belgium in international games and tournaments.

It is controlled by the Koninklijke Belgische Baseball- en Softbalbond (Royal Belgian Baseball- and Softball Federation) and participates in international tournaments of the supranational softball organisations ESF and ISF, like the European championship and the world championship. As of 2013, the team never attended world championships but did participate in 7 European championships.

== World Championship ==
Year	Place	Pld	W	L	PF	PA
(Mexico) 1966	Did not qualify					
(United States) 1968	Did not qualify					
(Philippines) 1972	Did not qualify					
(New Zealand) 1976	Did not qualify					
(United States) 1980	Did not qualify					
(United States) 1984	Did not qualify					
(Canada) 1988	Did not qualify					

Year	Place	Pld	W	L	PF	PA
(Philippines) 1992	Did not qualify					
(United States) 1996	Did not qualify					
(South Africa) 2000	Did not qualify					
(New Zealand) 2004	Did not qualify					
(Canada) 2009	Did not qualify					
(New Zealand) 2013	Did not qualify					
Total	0/13	0	0	0	0	0

== European Championship ==
Year	Place	Pld	W	L	PF	PA
(Czech Republic) 1993	Did not compete					
(Denmark) 1995	Did not compete					
(Netherlands) 1997	Did not compete					
(Czech Republic) 1999	5					
(Belgium) 2001	5					
(Czech Republic) 2003	5					

Year	Place	Pld	W	L	PF	PA							
(Netherlands) 2005	6												
(Belgium) 2007	4												
(Denmark) 2008	5												
(Czech Republic) 2010	6												
(Netherlands) 2012	6												
(Italy) 2016	3												
(Denmark) 2023	3						Total	7/10	-	-	-	-	-

Red border colour indicates tournament was held on home soil.
