= Hørsholm Hurricanes =

Danish softball club

Hørsholm Hurricanes is the oldest professional softball club in Denmark, founded in 1977. Over the years the Hurricanes have won 15 Danish Men's Championships and also provided the national team with numerous players. The Hurricanes have won the 2010, 2011, 2012, 2014 and 2017 Danish Championship, and the team also won the European Cup for European clubteams in 2011 and 2012. The Hurricanes play all home games at Hurricane Park in Hørsholm Sportspark.
