= Denmark national baseball team =

National baseball team of Denmark

Information
- Country: Denmark
- Federation: Danish Baseball Confederation
- Confederation: WBSC Europe

WBSC ranking
- Current: NR (26 March 2026)

The Denmark national baseball team is the national baseball team of Denmark. The team represents Denmark in international competitions. Baseball is still a relatively unknown sport in Denmark. Many of the Danish baseball players are from Danish communities in Canada and the United States.

Baseball in Denmark exists in the cities of Aarhus, Odense, Herning and Copenhagen. As of autumn 2022, the Copenhagen Baseball Club initiated a new playing field in Valby. Denmark has had a senior national baseball league (DM) since 2014. In 2014 a new international standard Odense baseball stadium was initiated as the Danish national stadium. With the formation of the Danish National Baseball Program in June 2024, this small nation has begun a saga to join the international baseball community and strive for elite performance levels. In September 2024 the newly formed U-15 Danish National team participated and won the first ever Nordic Baseball Championship tournament that included teams from Norway, Sweden and Finland This is the first step in many by the Danish National Baseball Program to put Denmark on the international baseball map. There are already plans for a U-18 national team within the coming years, with the mission to bring Denmark closer to be able to qualify for Olympic baseball.
