= Denmark women's national softball team =

Denmark women's national softball team is the national team for Denmark. The team competed at the 1998 ISF Women's World Championship in Fujinomiya City, Japan where they finished seventeenth.
