= Super 6 Baseball and Softball =

- Sport: Baseball
- Founded: 2018
- No. of teams: 12 (6 in baseball and 6 in softball)

The Super 6 Baseball and Softball is a tournament between national baseball teams in Europe, governed by the Confederation of European Baseball (CEB), the European Softball Federation (ESF) and the World Baseball Softball Confederation (WBSC). It was held for the first and only time from September 18 to 23, 2018 in Hoofddorp, Netherlands. It was organized by the Royal Dutch Baseball and Softball Association (KNBSB), the City of Hoofddorp and the local baseball club Hoofddorp Pioniers. It was featured by the top 6 nations of the 2016 European Championship and ESF Women's Championship.

== Baseball ==
Super 6 Baseball and Softball
Tournament details
- Country: Netherlands
- Dates: September 18–23, 2018
- Teams: 6

Final positions
- Champions: Netherlands (1st title)
- Runners-up: Italy
- Third place: Spain
- Fourth place: Belgium

Tournament statistics
- Games played: 16

=== Teams ===
The top six teams of the 2016 European Championship qualified automatically for the tournament.

| Belgium | 6th, 2016 European Baseball Championship | Italy | 2016 European Baseball Championship |
| Czech Republic | 5th, 2016 European Baseball Championship | Netherlands | 2016 European Baseball Championship |
| Germany | 4th, 2016 European Baseball Championship | Spain | 2016 European Baseball Championship |

=== Qualification round ===
==== Standings ====
| Qualified for the Final |

| Teams | W | L | Pct. | GB | R | RA |
|---|---|---|---|---|---|---|
| Netherlands | 4 | 0 | 1.000 | – | 41 | 25 |
| Italy | 4 | 1 | .800 | 0.5 | 59 | 29 |
| Spain | 3 | 2 | .600 | 1.5 | 49 | 29 |
| Belgium | 1 | 3 | .250 | 3.0 | 27 | 41 |
| Germany | 1 | 4 | .200 | 3.5 | 14 | 44 |
| Czech Republic | 1 | 4 | .200 | 3.5 | 42 | 54 |

===== Day 1 =====
September 18, 11:00 at ETO Ballpark (F/7)
| Team | 1 | 2 | 3 | 4 | 5 | 6 | 7 | 8 | 9 | R | H | E |
|---|---|---|---|---|---|---|---|---|---|---|---|---|
| Germany | 0 | 0 | 0 | 0 | 1 | 0 | 0 | X | X | 1 | 4 | 0 |
| Italy | 0 | 1 | 2 | 0 | 0 | 5 | 3 | X | X | 11 | 15 | 0 |
WP: Luis Lugo (1–0) LP: Daniel Thieben (0–1); Home runs: GER: None; ITA: Chris Colabello (1), Nicola Garbella (1), Alex Liddi (1), Drew Maggi (1), Leonardo Zileri (1); Attendance: 89; Umpires: HP − Efrem Silvania, 1B − Cuachtemoc Suares, 3B − Ken Macri; Notes: Completed early due to 10–run mercy rule after 7 innings. Boxscore

September 18, 15.00 at ETO Ballpark (F/7)
| Team | 1 | 2 | 3 | 4 | 5 | 6 | 7 | 8 | 9 | R | H | E |
|---|---|---|---|---|---|---|---|---|---|---|---|---|
| Belgium | 1 | 0 | 0 | 0 | 0 | 0 | 0 | X | X | 1 | 6 | 3 |
| Spain | 2 | 4 | 2 | 1 | 4 | 0 | X | X | X | 13 | 14 | 0 |
WP: Lowuin Sacramento (1–0) LP: Kenny Vandenbranden (0–1); Home runs: BEL: None; ESP: Engel Beltré (1), Yancarlo Franco (1), Luis Guillorme (1); Attendance: 173; Umpires: HP − David Kulhanek, 1B − Mojmir Jankovic, 3B − Thorsten Roloff; Notes: Completed early due to 10–run mercy rule after 7 innings. Boxscore

September 18, 19.30 at ETO Ballpark
| Team | 1 | 2 | 3 | 4 | 5 | 6 | 7 | 8 | 9 | R | H | E |
|---|---|---|---|---|---|---|---|---|---|---|---|---|
| Czech Republic | 0 | 0 | 0 | 0 | 0 | 1 | 0 | 5 | X | 6 | 7 | 2 |
| Netherlands | 0 | 0 | 4 | 0 | 1 | 2 | 0 | 0 | X | 7 | 13 | 0 |
WP: Orlando Yntema (1–0) LP: Radim Chroust (0–1) Sv: Kevin Kelly (1); Attendance: 400; Umpires: HP − Jens Waider, 1B − Thorsten Roloff, 3B − Michele De Notta; Boxscore

===== Day 2 =====
September 19, 11:00 at ETO Ballpark
| Team | 1 | 2 | 3 | 4 | 5 | 6 | 7 | 8 | 9 | R | H | E |
|---|---|---|---|---|---|---|---|---|---|---|---|---|
| Italy | 0 | 0 | 3 | 1 | 0 | 1 | 0 | 0 | 2 | 7 | 13 | 2 |
| Belgium | 0 | 0 | 0 | 0 | 0 | 1 | 0 | 3 | X | 4 | 6 | 0 |
WP: Angelo Palumbo (1–0) LP: Artuur Driessens (0–1) Sv: Alex Bassani (1); Home runs: ITA: Robel García (1); BEL: None; Attendance: 166; Umpires: HP − Mojmir Jankovic, 1B − Thorsten Roloff, 3B − Jens Waider; Boxscore

September 19, 15:00 at ETO Ballpark
| Team | 1 | 2 | 3 | 4 | 5 | 6 | 7 | 8 | 9 | R | H | E |
|---|---|---|---|---|---|---|---|---|---|---|---|---|
| Spain | 5 | 0 | 3 | 0 | 1 | 2 | 1 | 0 | 0 | 12 | 14 | 0 |
| Czech Republic | 0 | 1 | 0 | 1 | 1 | 0 | 4 | 0 | 0 | 7 | 12 | 3 |
WP: Ricardo Hernández (1–0) LP: Jan Novak (0–1); Home runs: ESP: Richard Montiel (1), Blake Ochoa (1), Jesús Ustariz (1); CZE: Tomas Junec (1), Jakub Malik (1); Attendance: 163; Umpires: HP − Michele Di Notta, 1B − Efrem Silvania, 3B − Ken Macri; Boxscore

September 19, 19:30 at ETO Ballpark (F/7)
| Team | 1 | 2 | 3 | 4 | 5 | 6 | 7 | 8 | 9 | R | H | E |
|---|---|---|---|---|---|---|---|---|---|---|---|---|
| Netherlands | 2 | 0 | 5 | 0 | 1 | 0 | 5 | X | X | 13 | X | X |
| Germany | 0 | 0 | 0 | 1 | 0 | 0 | 0 | X | X | 1 | X | X |
WP: Diegomar Markwell (1–0) LP: Enorbel Márquez (0–1); Home runs: NED: Dwayne Kemp (1), Dudley Leonora (1), Sicnarf Loopstok (1); GER: None; Attendance: 650; Umpires: HP − Cuauhtemoc Suares, 1B − Ken Macri, 3B − David Kulhanek; Notes: Completed early due to 10–run mercy rule after 7 innings. Boxscore

===== Day 3 =====
September 20, 11:00 at ETO Ballpark
| Team | 1 | 2 | 3 | 4 | 5 | 6 | 7 | 8 | 9 | R | H | E |
|---|---|---|---|---|---|---|---|---|---|---|---|---|
| Belgium | 0 | 4 | 0 | 3 | 0 | 1 | 2 | 0 | 0 | 10 | 18 | 2 |
| Czech Republic | 5 | 0 | 1 | 1 | 0 | 0 | 3 | 5 | X | 15 | 12 | 1 |
WP: Martin Schneider (1–0) LP: Yannick Gontier (0–1); Home runs: BEL: Steven de Lannoy (1), Dennis De Quindt (1), Thomas De Wolf (1); CZE: Martin Cervinka (1), Premek Chroust (1), Matej Hejma (1), Martin Muzik (1); Attendance: 113; Umpires: HP − Thorsten Roloff, 1B − Michele De Notta, 3B − Efrem Silvania; Boxscore

September 20, 15:00 at ETO Ballpark
| Team | 1 | 2 | 3 | 4 | 5 | 6 | 7 | 8 | 9 | R | H | E |
|---|---|---|---|---|---|---|---|---|---|---|---|---|
| Spain | 2 | 0 | 2 | 1 | 0 | 0 | 4 | 0 | 0 | 9 | 14 | 0 |
| Germany | 0 | 0 | 1 | 0 | 0 | 0 | 0 | 0 | 0 | 1 | 5 | 1 |
WP: Daniel Álvarez (1–0) LP: Markus Solbach (0–1); Home runs: ESP: Luis Guillorme (2), Richard Montiel (2); GER: None; Attendance: 142; Umpires: HP − Ken Macri, 1B − David Kulhanek, 3B − Mojmir Jankovic; Boxscore

September 20, 19:30 at ETO Ballpark (F/10)
| Team | 1 | 2 | 3 | 4 | 5 | 6 | 7 | 8 | 9 | 10 | R | H | E |
|---|---|---|---|---|---|---|---|---|---|---|---|---|---|
| Italy | 2 | 2 | 0 | 2 | 0 | 0 | 0 | 0 | 1 | 1 | 8 | 13 | 0 |
| Netherlands | 0 | 2 | 2 | 0 | 0 | 1 | 0 | 0 | 2 | 2 | 9 | 11 | 2 |
WP: Loek van Mil (1–0) LP: Alex Bassani (0–1); Home runs: ITA: Chris Colabello (2); NED: Sicnarf Loopstok (2,3), Kalian Sams (1,2), Curt Smith (2); Attendance: 850; Umpires: HP − Jens Waider, 1B − Mojmir Jankovic, 3B − Cuauhtemoc Suares; Boxscore

===== Day 4 =====
September 21, 11:00 at ETO Ballpark
| Team | 1 | 2 | 3 | 4 | 5 | 6 | 7 | 8 | 9 | R | H | E |
|---|---|---|---|---|---|---|---|---|---|---|---|---|
| Germany | 0 | 2 | 0 | 0 | 0 | 0 | 0 | 3 | 1 | 6 | 7 | 1 |
| Belgium | 0 | 2 | 1 | 0 | 2 | 0 | 2 | 0 | X | 7 | 12 | 1 |
WP: Cedric De Smedt (1–0) LP: Sascha Koch (0–1) Sv: Kevin De Smedt (1); Home runs: GER: Maik Ehmcke (1); BEL: Dennis De Quindt (2), Thomas De Wolf (2); Attendance: 73; Umpires: HP − Mojmir Jankovic, 1B − Efrem Silvania, 3B − David Kulhanek; Boxscore

September 21, 15:00 at ETO Ballpark (F/5)
| Team | 1 | 2 | 3 | 4 | 5 | 6 | 7 | 8 | 9 | R | H | E |
|---|---|---|---|---|---|---|---|---|---|---|---|---|
| Czech Republic | 1 | 0 | 2 | 4 | 3 | X | X | X | X | 10 | 8 | 1 |
| Italy | 5 | 8 | 1 | 8 | 3 | X | X | X | X | 25 | 24 | 1 |
WP: Carlos Terán (1–0) LP: Boris Bokaj (0–1); Home runs: CZE: Matej Hejma (2), Jakub Malik (2); ITA: Chris Colabello (3,4,5), Nicola Garbella (2), Robel García (2), Alex Liddi (2,3), Giuseppe Mazzanti (1), Alberto Mineo (1); Attendance: 125; Umpires: HP − Cuauhtemoc Suares, 1B − Ken Macri, 3B − Efrem Silvania; Notes: Completed early due to 15–run mercy rule after 5 innings. Boxscore

===== Day 5 =====
September 22, 11:00 at Sportpark Pioneer
| Team | 1 | 2 | 3 | 4 | 5 | 6 | 7 | 8 | 9 | R | H | E |
|---|---|---|---|---|---|---|---|---|---|---|---|---|
| Spain | 1 | 1 | 0 | 0 | 0 | 1 | 0 | 1 | 1 | 5 | 10 | 1 |
| Italy | 0 | 4 | 0 | 4 | 0 | 0 | 0 | 0 | X | 8 | 14 | 0 |
WP: Luis Lugo (2–0) LP: Richard Castillo (0–1) Sv: Andrea Pizziconi (1); Home runs: ESP: Engel Beltré (2), Blake Ochoa (2); ITA: Robel García (3), Drew Maggi (2, 3), Giuseppe Mazzanti (2); Attendance: 151; Umpires: HP – Efrem Silvania, 1B – David Kulhanek, 3B – Jens Waider; Boxscore

September 22, 11:00 at ETO Ballpark
| Team | 1 | 2 | 3 | 4 | 5 | 6 | 7 | 8 | 9 | R | H | E |
|---|---|---|---|---|---|---|---|---|---|---|---|---|
| Czech Republic | 0 | 0 | 0 | 0 | 0 | 2 | 0 | 2 | 0 | 4 | 5 | 2 |
| Germany | 0 | 3 | 0 | 1 | 0 | 0 | 0 | 1 | X | 5 | 5 | 0 |
WP: Niklas Rimmel (1–0) LP: Jan Novak (0–2); Home runs: CZE: None; GER: Vincent Ahrens (1), Simon Gühring (1); Attendance: 221; Umpires: HP – Ken Macri, 1B – Cuauhtemoc Suares, 3B – Mojmir Jankovic; Boxscore

September 22, 15:00 at ETO Ballpark (F/8)
| Team | 1 | 2 | 3 | 4 | 5 | 6 | 7 | 8 | 9 | R | H | E |
|---|---|---|---|---|---|---|---|---|---|---|---|---|
| Netherlands | 3 | 1 | 0 | 0 | 0 | 2 | 0 | 6 | 0 | 12 | 11 | 1 |
| Spain | 0 | 1 | 0 | 4 | 0 | 2 | 0 | 3 | X | 10 | 12 | 2 |
WP: Tom Stuifbergen (1–0) LP: Andrés Pérez (0–1); Home runs: NED: Yurendell DeCaster (1), Kirvin Moesquit (1); ESP: Lesther Galván (1), Luis Guillorme (3); Attendance: 850; Umpires: HP – Michele De Notta, 1B – Jens Waider, 3B – Thorsten Roloff; Notes: Stopped in the 8th inning due to rain. The game started the day after and was postponed after 1 inning. Boxscore

September 22, 19:00 at ETO Ballpark
| Team | 1 | 2 | 3 | 4 | 5 | 6 | 7 | 8 | 9 | R | H | E |
|---|---|---|---|---|---|---|---|---|---|---|---|---|
| Netherlands | X | X | X | X | X | X | X | X | X | X | X | X |
| Belgium | X | X | X | X | X | X | X | X | X | X | X | X |
Notes: Cancelled due to rain

=== Final ===
September 23, 13:30 at ETO Ballpark
| Team | 1 | 2 | 3 | 4 | 5 | 6 | 7 | 8 | 9 | R | H | E |
|---|---|---|---|---|---|---|---|---|---|---|---|---|
| Italy | X | X | X | X | X | X | X | X | X | X | X | X |
| Netherlands | X | X | X | X | X | X | X | X | X | X | X | X |
Notes: Was cancelled due to rain. Netherlands, which finished 1st the Round Robin, was awarded with the championship.

=== Statistics leaders ===
==== Batting ====
| Statistic | Name | Total/Avg |
|---|---|---|
| Batting average* | (Italy) Chris Colabello | .700 |
| Hits | (Italy) Chris Colabello | 14 |
| Runs | (Italy) Alex Liddi | 13 |
| Home runs | (Italy) Chris Colabello | 5 |
| RBI | (Italy) Chris Colabello | 14 |
| Walks | (Czech Republic) Peter Cech | 8 |
| Strikeouts | (Italy) Alex Liddi | 0 |
| Stolen bases | 6 players | 1 |
| On-base percentage* | (Italy) Chris Colabello | .750 |
| Slugging percentage* | (Italy) Chris Colabello | 1.450 |
| OPS* | (Italy) Chris Colabello | 2.300 |

* Minimum 2.7 plate appearances per game

==== Pitching ====
| Statistic | Name | Total/Avg |
|---|---|---|
| Wins | (Italy) Luis Lugo | 2 |
| Losses | (Czech Republic) Jan Novak | 2 |
| Saves | 4 players | 1 |
| Innings pitched | (Italy) Luis Lugo | 12.0 |
| Hits allowed* | (Belgium) Drew Janssens (Italy) Angelo Palumbo | 3 |
| Runs allowed* | 4 players | 1 |
| Earned runs allowed* | (Spain) Daniel Álvarez | 0 |
| ERA* | (Spain) Daniel Álvarez | 0.00 |
| Walks* | (Italy) Alessandro Maestri (Netherlands) Diegomar Markwell | 0 |
| Strikeouts | (Italy) Luis Lugo | 13 |

* Minimum 1.0 inning pitched per game

=== Baseball results ===
| Year | Final Host | Final | | Semifinalists | |
| Year | Final Host | Champions | Runners-up | 3rd place | 4th place |
| 2018 details | (Netherlands); Hoofddorp | Netherlands | Italy | Spain | Belgium |

== Softball results ==
| Year | Final Host | Final | | Semifinalists | |
| Year | Final Host | Champions | Runners-up | 3rd place | 4th place |
| 2018 details | (Netherlands); Hoofddorp | Czech Republic | Italy | Great Britain | Netherlands |

== Medal table ==
=== Baseball ===
| Rank | Nation | Gold | Silver | Bronze | Total |
|---|---|---|---|---|---|
| 1 | Netherlands | 1 | 0 | 0 | 1 |
| 2 | Italy | 0 | 1 | 0 | 1 |
| 3 | Spain | 0 | 0 | 1 | 1 |
| Totals (3 entries) | | 1 | 1 | 1 | 3 |

=== Softball ===
| Rank | Nation | Gold | Silver | Bronze | Total |
|---|---|---|---|---|---|
| 1 | Czech Republic | 1 | 0 | 0 | 1 |
| 2 | Italy | 0 | 1 | 0 | 1 |
| 3 | Great Britain | 0 | 0 | 1 | 1 |
| Totals (3 entries) | | 1 | 1 | 1 | 3 |

== See also ==
- European Baseball Championship
- ESF Women's Championship
- European Cup (baseball)
- European Champion Cup Final Four
- Baseball awards § Europe
