= ESF Co-Ed Slowpitch European Super Cup =

- Sport: Softball
- Founded: 2007
- Administrator: European Softball Federation
- No. of teams: 18 (in 2025)
- Continent: Europe
- Most recent champion: UCE Travellers (Germany) (2025)
- Most titles: London Chromies (United Kingdom) (3)

The Co-Ed Slowpitch European Super Cup (CSPESC) is a club championship tournament between national club champions for co-ed Slowpitch Softball teams in Europe, governed by the WBSC Europe after merging with the European Softball Federation in 2018.

== Results ==
| Year | Host | Champions | Runners-up | 3rd place | 4th place |
|---|---|---|---|---|---|
| 2007 | (France); Limeil-Brévannes | London Chromies (United Kingdom) | Dodder Dynamoes (Republic of Ireland) | Sparks BAK Mlade Buky (Czech Republic) | ASKOE Linz Stamm Bandits (Austria) |
| 2008 | (Bulgaria); Dupnitsa | Baker Tomkins (United Kingdom) | Dodder Dynamoes (Republic of Ireland) | ASKOE Linz Stamm Bandits (Austria) | Balkan Stars Sofia (Bulgaria) |
| 2009 | (Bulgaria); Dupnitsa | Dodder Dynamoes (Republic of Ireland) | Dragons (United Kingdom) | ASKOE Linz Stamm Bandits (Austria) | Sparks BAK Mlade Buky (Czech Republic) |
| 2010 | (Slovenia); Ljubljana | London Chromies (United Kingdom) | Dodder Dynamoes (Republic of Ireland) | BatPak (Republic of Ireland) | Longbridge (Slovenia) |
| 2011 | (Czech Republic); Mlade Buky | London Chromies (United Kingdom) | Limerick (Republic of Ireland) | Pioneers (United Kingdom) | Sparks Bak (Czech Republic) |
| 2012 | (Czech Republic); Pardubice | Lisicke (Slovenia) | London Chromies (United Kingdom) | UCE Travellers (Germany) | Paos Pardubice (Czech Republic) |
| 2014 | (Czech Republic); Mlade Buky | UCE Travellers (Germany) | London Chromies (United Kingdom) | H2O (United Kingdom) | Lisicke (Slovenia) |
| 2016 | (Austria); Wiener Neustadt | H2O (United Kingdom) | London Chromies (United Kingdom) | UCE Travellers (Germany) | DNAce (Czech Republic) |
| 2018 | (Italy); Riccione | Pioneers (United Kingdom) | H2O (United Kingdom) | London Chromies (United Kingdom) | Bandits Witches Linz (Austria) |
| 2021 | (Bulgaria); Sofia | Waynes Pardubice (Czech Republic) | UCE Travellers (Germany) | Eastpro/StokesBBQ (Netherlands) | Sparks Mladé Buky (Czech Republic) |
| 2023 | (Bulgaria); Sofia | H2O (United Kingdom) | Eastpro/StokesBBQ (Netherlands) | UCE Travellers (Germany) | Travelling Dodgers (United Kingdom) |
| 2025 | (Germany) Berlin | UCE Travellers (Germany) | Pioneers (United Kingdom) | H2O (United Kingdom) | Legends (United Kingdom) |

=== Medal table ===
| Rank | Nation | Gold | Silver | Bronze | Total |
|---|---|---|---|---|---|
| 1 | Great Britain | 7 | 6 | 4 | 17 |
| 2 | Germany | 2 | 1 | 3 | 6 |
| 3 | Ireland | 1 | 4 | 1 | 6 |
| 4 | Czech Republic | 1 | 0 | 1 | 2 |
| 5 | Slovenia | 1 | 0 | 0 | 1 |
| 6 | Netherlands | 0 | 1 | 1 | 2 |
| 7 | Austria | 0 | 0 | 2 | 2 |
| Totals (7 entries) | | 12 | 12 | 12 | 36 |
