= ESF Co-Ed Slowpitch European Championships =

Slowpitch softball tournament

- Sport: Softball
- Founded: 1998
- No. of teams: 6 (in 2015); 6 (in 2017); 9 (in 2022); 10 (in 2024)
- Continent: Europe
- Most recent champion: Great Britain (United Kingdom) (2024)
- Most titles: Great Britain (United Kingdom) (13)

The Coed Slowpitch European Championship is the main championship tournament between national coeducational slowpitch softball teams in Europe, governed by WBSC Europe. Prior to 2018 this tournament was governed by the European Softball Federation (ESF).

The 2024 tournament took place in Pardubice, Czech Republic between July 15 and July 20. Ten teams participated in the 2024 championship: Austria, Belgium, Bulgaria, Czech Republic, Germany, Great Britain, Ireland, Netherlands, Norway, and Serbia.

The current European champions are Great Britain who beat Czechia, 23-18, in the 2024 Championship game.

== Results ==
Year	Host	Final		Semifinalists	
Year	Host	Champions	Runners-up	3rd place	4th place
1998	(United Kingdom); London	(United Kingdom); Great Britain	Czech Republic	(Republic of Ireland); Ireland	Guernsey
2000	(Republic of Ireland); Dublin	(United Kingdom); Great Britain	Czech Republic	(Republic of Ireland); Ireland	Guernsey
2002	(Czech Republic); Mladé Buky	(United Kingdom); Great Britain	(Republic of Ireland); Ireland	Austria	Czech Republic
2004	(Austria); Linz	(United Kingdom); Great Britain	(Republic of Ireland); Ireland	Czech Republic	Austria
2006	(Slovenia); Ljubljana	(United Kingdom); Great Britain	Czech Republic	(Republic of Ireland); Ireland	Slovenia
2008	(United Kingdom); Southampton	(United Kingdom); Great Britain	(Republic of Ireland); Ireland	Czech Republic	Jersey
2010	(Czech Republic); Prague	(United Kingdom); Great Britain	Czech Republic	(Republic of Ireland); Ireland	Guernsey
2011	(Bulgaria); Dupnitsa	(United Kingdom); Great Britain	Slovenia	(Republic of Ireland); Ireland	Bulgaria
2013	(Czech Republic); Pardubice	(United Kingdom); Great Britain	Slovenia	Germany	(Republic of Ireland); Ireland
2015	(Bulgaria); Dupnitsa	(United Kingdom); Great Britain	Czech Republic	(Republic of Ireland); Ireland	Germany
2017	(Bulgaria); Sofia	Germany	(United Kingdom); Great Britain	Slovenia	(Republic of Ireland); Ireland
2019	(Hungary); Budapest	(United Kingdom); Great Britain	Germany	(Republic of Ireland); Ireland	Czech Republic
2022	(Slovenia); Ljubljana	(United Kingdom); Great Britain	Germany	Netherlands	Czech Republic
2024	(Czech Republic); Pardubice	(United Kingdom); Great Britain	Czech Republic	Germany	(Republic of Ireland); Ireland
2026	(United Kingdom); London				

The 2021 Coed Slowpitch European Championship was cancelled due to COVID-19.

=== Medal table ===
Rank	Nation	Gold	Silver	Bronze	Total
1	Great Britain	13	1	0	14
2	Germany	1	2	2	5
3	Czech Republic	0	6	2	8
4	Ireland	0	3	7	10
5	Slovenia	0	2	1	3
6	Austria	0	0	1	1
6	Netherlands	0	0	1	1
Totals (7 entries)		14	14	14	42
