= Luis Guillorme =

Venezuelan baseball player (born 1994)

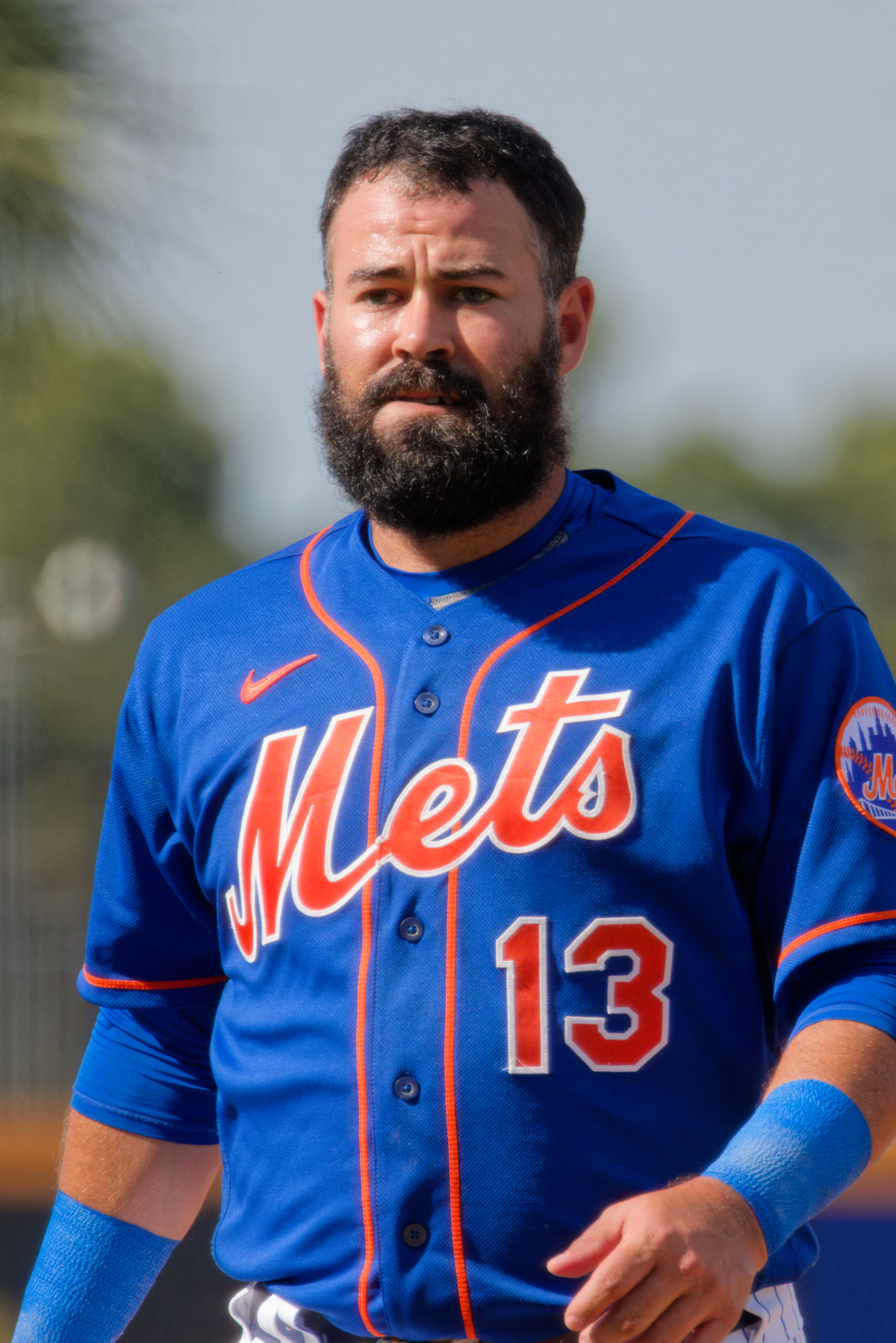
- Guillorme with the New York Mets in 2023

Saraperos de Saltillo – No. 13
- Infielder
- Born: September 27, 1994 (age 32); Caracas, Venezuela
- Bats: Left Throws: Right

MLB debut
- May 11, 2018, for the New York Mets

MLB statistics (through 2025 season)
- Batting average: .248
- Home runs: 5
- Runs batted in: 58
- Stats at Baseball Reference

Teams
- New York Mets (2018–2023); Atlanta Braves (2024); Los Angeles Angels (2024); Arizona Diamondbacks (2024); Houston Astros (2025)
Medals
Representing Spain
European Baseball Championship
Silver medal – second place	2016 Hoofddorp	Team

Luis Miguel Guillorme Gonzalez (born September 27, 1994), nicknamed Luismi, is a Spanish-Venezuelan-American professional baseball infielder for the Saraperos de Saltillo of the Mexican League. He has previously played in Major League Baseball (MLB) for the New York Mets, Atlanta Braves, Los Angeles Angels, Arizona Diamondbacks, and Houston Astros.

== Early life ==
Guillorme was born in Caracas, Venezuela. His grandparents immigrated from Spain and he holds Spanish and Venezuelan citizenship. As a child, he modeled his game after native Caracas infielder Omar Vizquel. In 2007, his family relocated to Davie, Florida. Guillorme attended Coral Springs Charter School in Coral Springs, Florida where, as a senior, he hit .565 with 34 runs batted in (RBIs). He committed to play college baseball at State College of Florida, Manatee–Sarasota. In 2016, Guillorme reported that he expected to apply for naturalization as a US citizen within a year or two.

== Professional career ==
=== New York Mets ===
==== Minor leagues ====
The New York Mets selected Guillorme in the 10th round of the 2013 Major League Baseball draft. He spent his first professional season with the Gulf Coast Mets where he slashed .258/.337/.283 with 11 RBIs in 41 games. He played 2014 with the Kingsport Mets and Savannah Sand Gnats, batting a combined .283 with 17 RBIs in sixty total games between both teams. He returned to Savannah in 2015 and was named the South Atlantic League MVP after he batted .381 with 55 RBIs, 18 stolen bases and a .746 on-base plus slugging (OPS) in 122 games. In 2016, Guillorme started at shortstop for the Spanish national baseball team in the qualifying for the 2017 World Baseball Classic. He spent 2016 with the St. Lucie Mets where he posted a .263 batting average with one home run and 46 RBIs, and 2017 with the Binghamton Rumble Ponies where he batted .283 with one home run, 43 RBIs and a .706 OPS.

During a spring training game in 2017, Miami Marlins infielder Adeiny Hechavarria accidentally let go of his bat while swinging at a pitch and sent it flying into the Mets dugout. Guillorme, who was standing at the dugout railing, casually reached up and caught the bat while his teammates scrambled to get out of the way. Highlights of the play went viral.

==== Major leagues ====
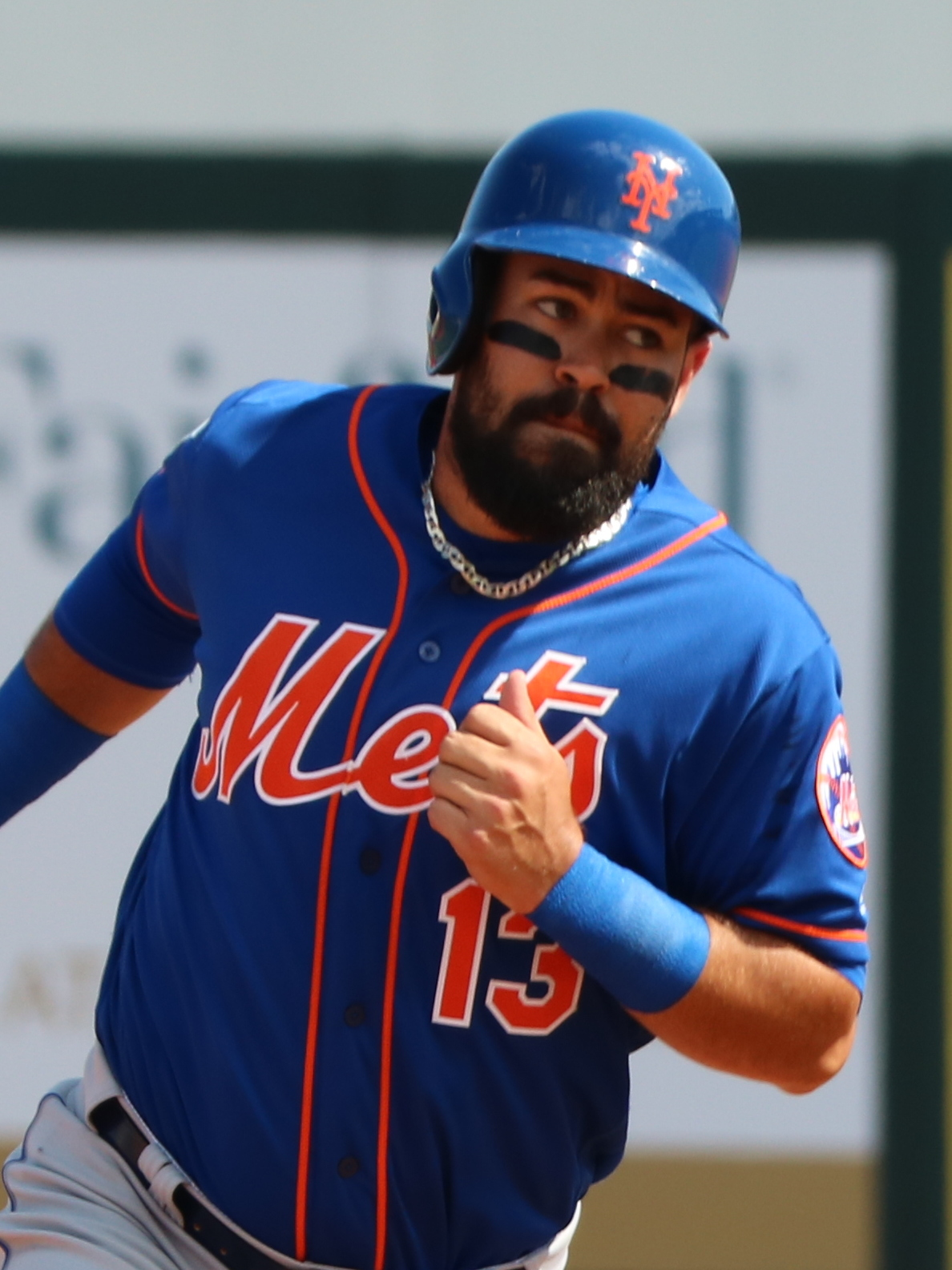
Guillorme with the Mets in 2019

The Mets added Guillorme to their 40-man roster after the 2017 season. Guillorme was called up to the Mets on May 9, 2018, when Tomas Nido was optioned to the Las Vegas 51s. On May 13 at Citizens Bank Park, Guillorme made his first Major League plate appearance; he singled off of Aaron Nola of the Philadelphia Phillies as a pinch hitter. On August 10, 2019, Guillorme hit his first major league home run in the 8th inning off of reliever Fernando Rodney. He finished the season hitting .246/.324/.361 with three RBIs. In 2020 for the Mets, Guillorme slashed .333/.426/.439 with nine RBIs in 29 games.

On March 14, 2021, Guillorme faced St. Louis Cardinals reliever Jordan Hicks in the longest at-bat in MLB history. The 22 pitch at-bat resulted in a walk. However, because this occurred during spring training, it was not official. In 2021, Guillorme batted .265/.374/.311 over a career-high 69 games.

Guillorme had a hot start to the 2022 season and, on June 11, when he had a batting average of .321 and OPS of .816, Mets manager Buck Showalter told reporters that he deserved a vote for the Major League Baseball All-Star Game. However, from that point until the end of the season, he hit .246 with a .620 OPS and finished the season at .273 and .691 respectively.

On May 17, 2023, the Mets optioned Guillorme to the Syracuse Mets and recalled infielder Mark Vientos. It was his first time being optioned to the minors since July 2019. Guillorme was recalled to the majors on June 9, 2023. He was placed on the injured list with a calf strain on July 22 and reactivated on September 18. On November 17, The Mets non-tendered Guillorme, making him a free agent.

=== Atlanta Braves ===
On January 5, 2024, Guillorme signed a one-year, $1.1 million contract with the Atlanta Braves. He was named to the Opening Day roster as a utility infielder, and went 3–for–20 (.150) with three RBI across nine games.

=== Los Angeles Angels ===
On May 9, 2024, the Braves traded Guillorme to the Los Angeles Angels in exchange for cash considerations or a player to be named later. In 50 games for the Angels, he slashed .231/.302/.298 with three RBI and one stolen base. Guillorme was designated for assignment on August 16, and released on August 18.

=== Arizona Diamondbacks ===
On August 20, 2024, Guillorme signed a major league contract with the Arizona Diamondbacks. In 18 games for the Diamondbacks, he hit .162/.347/.216 with four RBI and three stolen bases. Guillorme was designated for assignment by Arizona on September 20. He elected free agency on September 24.

=== Houston Astros ===
On February 11, 2025, Guillorme signed a minor league contract with the Houston Astros. In 57 appearances for the Triple-A Sugar Land Space Cowboys, he batted .248/.377/.317 with two home runs, 22 RBI, and three stolen bases. On June 14, the Astros selected Guillorme's contract, adding him to their active roster. In 12 appearances for Houston, he went 3-for-20 (.150) with one walk. On July 28, Guillorme was removed from the 40-man roster and sent outright to Sugar Land; he subsequently rejected the assignment and elected free agency. Guillorme re-signed with the Astros on a minor league contract two days later. He was released by the Astros organization on August 4.

=== Toros de Tijuana ===
On March 4, 2026, Guillorme signed with the Toros de Tijuana of the Mexican League. He made five appearances for Tijuana, going 1-for-13 (.077) with one home run and two RBI. On April 24, Guillorme was released by the Toros.

=== Saraperos de Saltillo ===
On May 22, 2026, Guillorme signed with the Saraperos de Saltillo of the Mexican League.

== International career ==
Guillorme played for the Spanish national baseball team at the 2016 European Baseball Championship in the Netherlands. He was named the tournament's most outstanding defensive player en route to a silver medal. He also represented Spain in the qualifying round of the 2017 World Baseball Classic and in the 2018 Super 6 Tournament.
