= ESF men's Super Cup club championship =

ESF men's Super Cup championship is a men's fastpitch tournament governed by the European Softball Federation, and started in 2012, merging the two previous ESF men's championships: Cup Winners Cup and European Cup. Results from this championship will still be kept under European Men's Cup Championship.
