= European Softball Federation =

Governing body of European softball

- Abbreviation: ESF
- Formation: 1976
- Dissolved: 2018
- Type: International sport federation
- Purpose: Sport governing body
- Region served: Europe
- Official language: English
- Parent organization: WBSC Europe
- Website: europeansoftball.org

The European Softball Federation (Fédération Européenne Softball, ESF), was the governing body of softball within Europe from 1976 until 2018, when it merged with the Confederation of European Baseball into WBSC Europe.

The ESF was founded in 1976 with 6 members, which were Belgium, France, Germany, Italy, Netherlands and Spain.

== Responsibilities ==
The Federation was responsible for operation of the European Women's Softball Championship, European Men's Softball Championship and the Co-Ed Slowpitch European Championships for national senior teams.

The Federation was responsible for operation of the European Junior Girls Softball Championship, European Junior Boys softball Championship, European Cadet Girls Softball Championship and the European Minime Girls Softball Championship for junior national teams.

The Federation was responsible for operation of the European Women's Cup Championship, European Women's Cup Winners Cup Championship, European Men's Cup Championship, European Men's Cup Winners Cup Championship, Co-Ed Slowpitch European Championships and the Co-Ed Slowpitch European Super Cup for club teams.

== Championships ==
- Super 6 Baseball and Softball
- ESF Women's Championship
- ESF Women's Division B Championship
- ESF Men's Championship
- ESF Junior Girls Championship
- ESF Junior Boys Championship
- ESF Co-Ed Slowpitch European Championships

Starting in 2012, the two ESF men's club championships have merged into the European Men's Super Cup Championship.

== Members ==
- Austria
- Belgium
- Bulgaria
- Croatia
- Czech Republic
- Denmark
- Finland
- France
- Germany
- United Kingdom
- Greece
- Guernsey
- Hungary
- Ireland
- Israel
- Italy
- Jersey
- Malta
- Netherlands
- Norway
- Poland
- Romania
- Russia
- San Marino
- Serbia
- Slovakia
- Slovenia
- Spain
- Sweden
- Switzerland
- Turkey
- Ukraine

== Observers ==
- Azerbaijan
- Belarus
- Cyprus
- Estonia
- Lithuania
