= Chris Colabello =

American baseball player (born 1983)

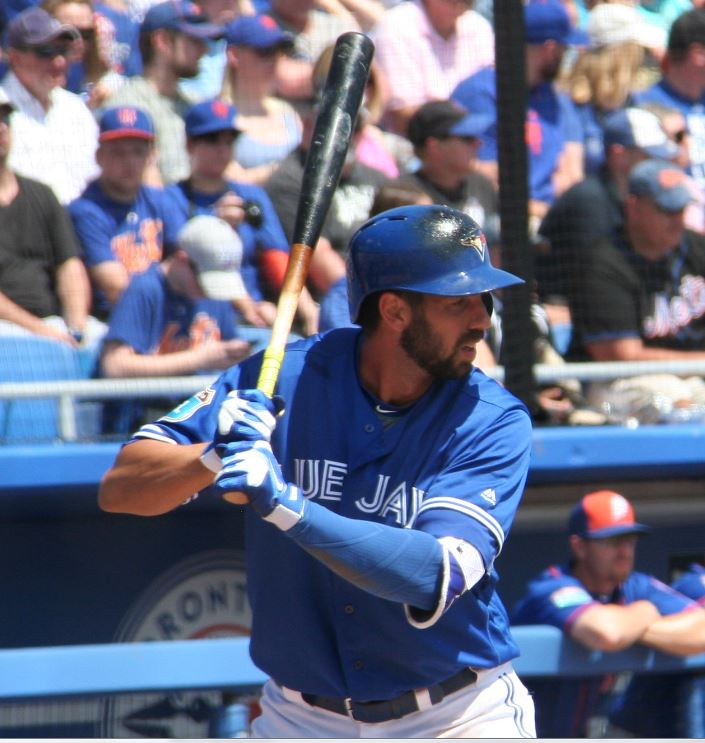
- Colabello with the Toronto Blue Jays
- First baseman / Outfielder
- Born: October 24, 1983 (age 43); Framingham, Massachusetts, U.S.
- Batted: Right Threw: Right

MLB debut
- May 22, 2013, for the Minnesota Twins

Last MLB appearance
- April 20, 2016, for the Toronto Blue Jays

MLB statistics
- Batting average: .259
- Home runs: 28
- Runs batted in: 111
- Stats at Baseball Reference

Teams
- Minnesota Twins (2013–2014); Toronto Blue Jays (2015–2016)

Christopher Adrian Colabello (born October 24, 1983) is an American former professional baseball first baseman and outfielder. He played in parts of four seasons in Major League Baseball (MLB) for the Minnesota Twins and Toronto Blue Jays, after playing seven seasons in independent baseball.

== Early life and amateur career ==
Born in Framingham, Massachusetts, Colabello grew up in Rimini, Italy. His mother, Silvanna, was born in Rimini, and his father, Lou, played baseball in Italy for seven years, later pitching in the 1984 Olympics. The family moved back to Massachusetts in 1991. Colabello graduated from Milford High School in Milford, Massachusetts. He then attended NCAA Division II Assumption University but was not drafted by an MLB team.

== Professional career ==
=== Worcester Tornadoes/Nashua Pride ===
Prior to joining the Twins organization in 2012, he played seven seasons in the independent Can-Am League for the Worcester Tornadoes (2005–2011) and Nashua Pride (part of 2007).

=== Minnesota Twins ===
==== Minor leagues ====
In 2012, his first season of affiliated baseball, Colabello batted .284 with 78 runs (4th in the league), 37 doubles (leading the league), 19 home runs (tied for 4th) and 98 runs batted in (RBI) (2nd) for the New Britain Rock Cats of the Double-A Eastern League. He started the 2013 season with the Rochester Red Wings of the Triple-A International League, hitting .358 with 12 home runs in 46 games before being promoted to Minnesota.

==== 2013 season ====
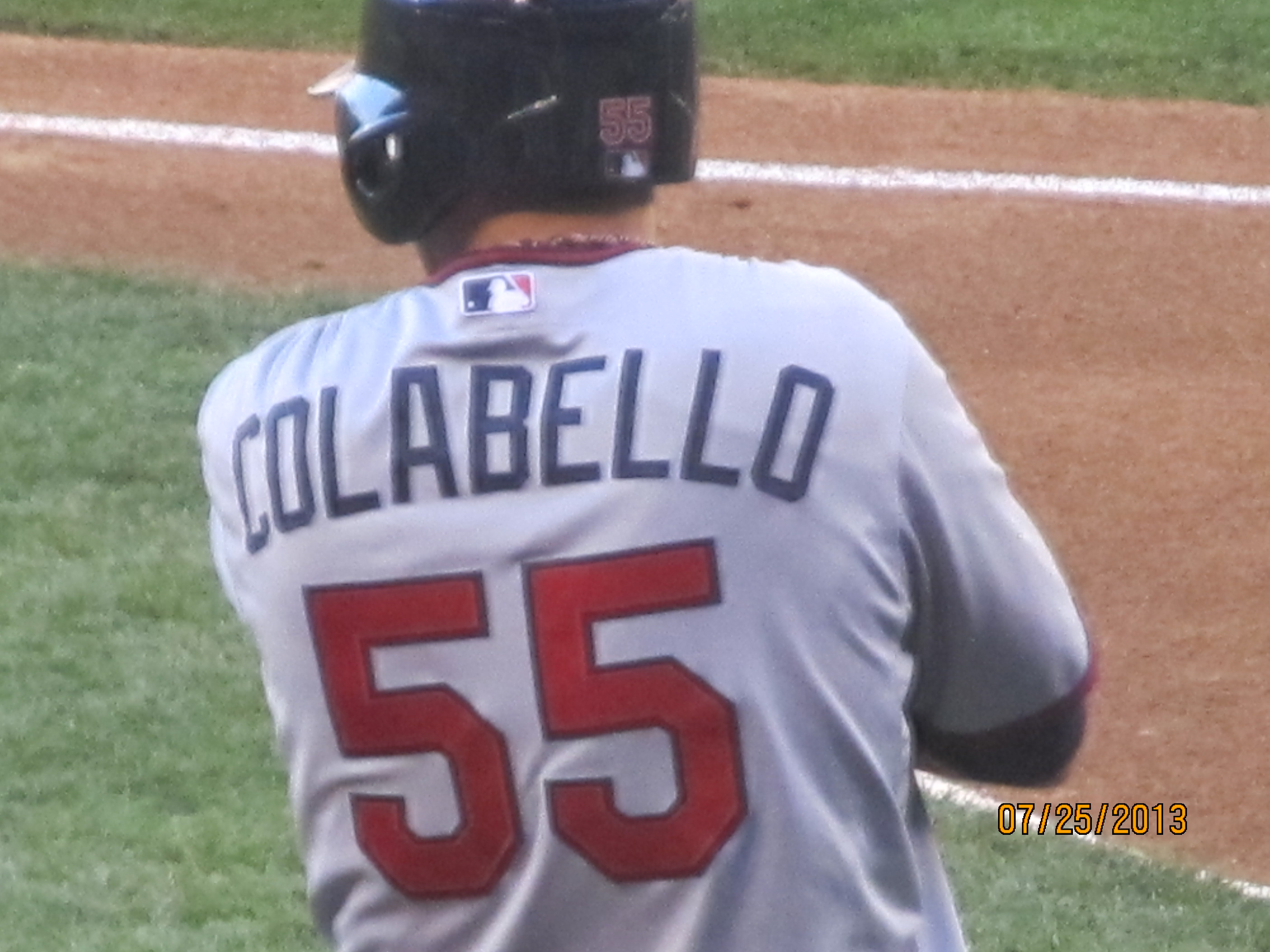
Colabello with the Twins.

On May 22, 2013, the Twins promoted Colabello to the major leagues; he made his debut that day. He was called up after Trevor Plouffe suffered a concussion and was placed on the 7-day disabled list. Colabello went 1-for-11 and was optioned on May 29. He was called back up on May 30 after a strained left calf forced Plouffe to the 15-day disabled list. However, after having played two additional games, Colabello was sent down again when Plouffe returned.

Colabello had a very successful minor league season, hitting .352/.427/.639 with 24 home runs (2nd in the league) and 76 RBIs (tied for 2nd) in 89 games, and was named the International League Most Valuable Player at the end of the year, as well as the Rookie of the Year. Called up to the Twins again towards the end of July, Colabello spent the rest of the year in the big leagues, but his .194 average and 7 home runs in 55 games was far off his minor league pace.

On September 2, 2013, Colabello hit his first major league grand slam off Houston Astros' reliever Chia Jen Lo, and Twins won 10–6.

After his 2013 season, Colabello garnered significant interest from several teams in the Korea Baseball Organization, including a reported $1 million contract offer from the LG Twins (with a similar $1 million buyout going to the Minnesota Twins). On December 21, Colabello announced that he would not pursue the opportunity to play overseas, saying "Going to Korea would mean giving up the dream of being a big-leaguer".

==== 2014 season ====
In 2014, Colabello made the Twins starting lineup out of the gate, rotating between outfield, first base, and designated hitter. He had a dazzling start to the season, batting .308 with 3 home runs, and 27 RBIs through his first 23 games. On April 26, Colabello surpassed Hall of Famer Kirby Puckett's Twins franchise record of 26 RBIs in the month of April. It was a club record that stood for 20 years.

His hot start soon fizzled out, largely due to a thumb injury he tried to play through. Colabello hit .125 in May, and was sent down to the minors by the end of the month. He was recalled by the Twins for July and early August, but did not regain his batting stroke, finishing the season batting .229.

=== Toronto Blue Jays ===
==== 2015 season ====
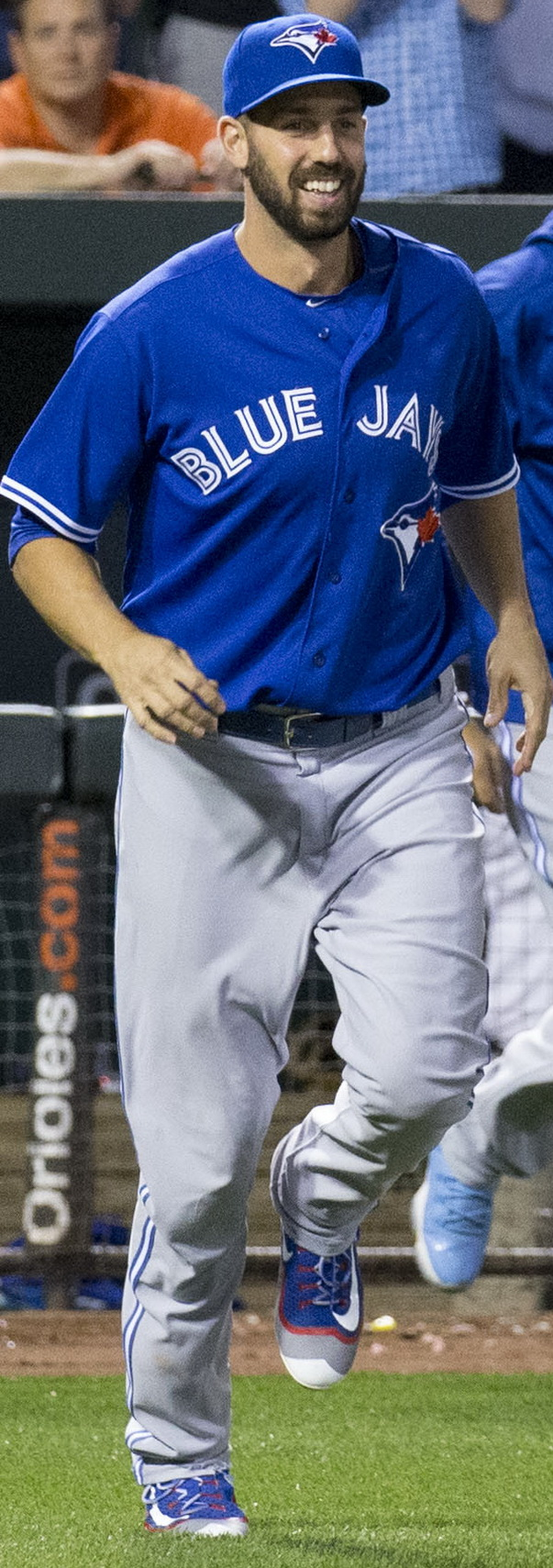
Colabello during the 2015 season

On December 8, 2014, the Toronto Blue Jays claimed Colabello off waivers. They designated him for assignment on February 4, 2015, and he was outrighted to the Triple-A Buffalo Bisons on February 11. Colabello batted .337 with 5 home runs and 18 RBI in April 2015, and was named the International League Player of the Month. On May 5, Colabello's contract was purchased by the Blue Jays. In his second game with the Blue Jays, he recorded his first career four-hit game. On May 29, Colabello played his first game against his former team, the Minnesota Twins. In the ninth inning, he hit a tiebreaking two-run home run off closer Glen Perkins to help the Blue Jays win 6–4. Colabello continued his excellent batting on June 7, when he helped the Blue Jays sweep the Houston Astros by hitting a walk-off two-run single. With the hit, he also extended his career-high hitting streak to 17 games. He hit his first career triple on October 2.

Colabello finished the 2015 regular season with career-highs in nearly every statistical category, including batting average (.321), hits (107), home runs (15), RBI (54), and on-base plus slugging (.886). He hit a solo home run in game 5 of the 2015 American League Championship Series, which helped the Blue Jays top the Kansas City Royals on October 21 and force a Game 6.

==== 2016: final MLB season and suspension ====
On April 22, 2016, Colabello was suspended 80 games without pay for testing positive on performance-enhancing drugs on March 13. This effectively ended his major league career, as Colabello never played another MLB game after the suspension began. At the time of his suspension, he was hitting .069 (2-for-29) in 10 games.

In response to the suspension, Colabello released the following statement:

On March 13, I got one of the scariest and most definitely the least expected calls of my entire life. I was informed by the Players Association that a banned substance was found in my urine. I have spent every waking moment since that day trying to find an answer as to why or how? The only thing I know is that I would never compromise the integrity of the game of baseball. I love this game too much! I care too deeply about it. I am saddened more for the impact this will have on my teammates, the organization and the fans of the Toronto Blue Jays. I hope that before anyone passes judgement on me they can take a look at the man that I am, and everything that I have done to get to where I am in my career.

On July 13, Colabello was assigned to the Advanced-A Dunedin Blue Jays for a rehab assignment. After rehab, he was assigned to the Triple-A Buffalo Bisons for the remainder of the 2016 season. In 40 games with the Bisons, Colabello hit .180 with five home runs and 11 RBI. On December 2, Colabello was outrighted to Triple-A after clearing waivers. He elected free agency on December 6.

=== Cleveland Indians ===
On December 20, 2016, Colabello signed a minor league contract with the Cleveland Indians that included an invitation to spring training. He did not make the Indians' major league roster, and was assigned to Triple-A. He was released on July 8, 2017, after hitting .225 in 72 games for the Triple-A Columbus Clippers.

=== Milwaukee Brewers ===
Colabello signed a minor league contract with the Milwaukee Brewers on July 18, 2017. He was assigned to the Triple-A Colorado Springs Sky Sox. He hit .301 in 44 games for the Sky Sox but was not placed on the big league roster when teams expanded to 40 players in September. He played briefly for Charros de Jalisco in the Mexican Pacific Winter League in October and early November before electing free agency on November 6.

=== Later career ===
In 2018, Colabello signed with the San Marino of the Italian Baseball League, appearing in a total of 9 games during the season.

On May 7, 2019, Colabello signed with the Sugar Land Skeeters of the Atlantic League of Professional Baseball. In 22 games for the Skeeters, he batted .195/.280/.268 with one home run and six RBI. On June 17, Colabello was removed from the active roster and placed on the reserve/retired list. On June 23, Colabello signed with the Kansas City T-Bones of the American Association of Independent Professional Baseball. In 56 games for Kansas City, he slashed .294/.375/.443 with nine home runs and 34 RBI. Colabello was released by the T-Bones on February 4, 2020.

On August 11, 2024, after four years of inactivity, Colabello signed with the Québec Capitales of the Frontier League. In his only game for Québec, he went 2-for-6 (.333). He became a free agent following the season.

== International career ==
Colabello played for Italy in several International tournaments. In the 2013 World Baseball Classic, he appeared in all 5 games that Italy participated in, going 6-for-18 (.333) with 2 HR and 7 RBI.

On November 22, 2016, it was announced that Colabello would play for Italy at the 2017 World Baseball Classic. He played in the tournament, appearing at first base in all 4 games in which Italy participated. He went 2-for-13 (.154), with 1 HR and 2 RBI.

In September 2018, Colabello played for the Italy in the 2018 Super 6 baseball tournament. He played for Italy in the 2019 European Baseball Championship. He played for the team at the Africa/Europe 2020 Olympic Qualification tournament, which took place in Italy in September 2019.

== See also ==
- List of Major League Baseball players suspended for performance-enhancing drugs
