= Luis Lugo =

Venezuelan baseball player (born 1994)

- Pitcher
- Born: March 5, 1994 (age 32); Barquisimeto, Venezuela
- Bats: Left Throws: Left
- Stats at Baseball Reference
Medals
Men's baseball
Representing Italy
European Baseball Championship
Bronze medal – third place	2016 Hoofddorp	National team

Luis Eduardo Lugo Lareschi (born March 5, 1994) is a Venezuelan-born Italian former professional baseball pitcher. Lugo was signed by the Cleveland Indians as an undrafted free agent in 2011. He played for Team Italy in the 2019 European Baseball Championship.

== Professional career ==
=== Cleveland Indians ===
Lugo was signed by the Cleveland Indians as an undrafted free agent on February 28, 2011. He began his professional career in 2011, appearing in 12 games between the Dominican Summer League Indians and the Arizona League Indians with an 0–5 record and a 3.93 ERA. The following season he spent entirely in Arizona, and then in 2013 he played for the Mahoning Valley Scrappers, starting 11 games with a 1–4 record and a 1.97 ERA. He was selected to the mid-season all-star team that year. He spent 2014 with the Lake County Captains and 2015 and 2016 with the Lynchburg Hillcats.

In 2017, Lugo made 26 appearances (25 starts) for the Double–A Akron RubberDucks, registering an 8–7 record and 4.35 ERA with 93 strikeouts in 134 1/3 innings pitched. He elected free agency following the season on November 6, 2017.

=== Parma Baseball Club ===
On December 1, 2017, Lugo signed a minor league contract with the Baltimore Orioles organization. He was released on March 30, 2018.

On May 3, 2018, Lugo signed with the Parmaclima Parma of the Italian Baseball League. In 8 appearances, Lugo recorded a 2.25 ERA with 37 strikeouts and 3 saves.

=== Kansas City Royals ===
On July 23, 2018, Lugo signed a minor league contract with the Kansas City Royals. In 8 games (4 starts) for the Double-A Northwest Arkansas Naturals, Lugo posted a 1-2 record and 4.18 ERA with 21 strikeouts across 23 2/3 innings pitched.

=== Chicago Cubs ===
On December 13, 2018, during the Winter Meetings, the Chicago Cubs selected Lugo from the Royals in the minor league phase of the Rule 5 draft. Lugo split the 2019 campaign between the High–A Myrtle Beach Pelicans and Double–A Tennessee Smokies, for whom he accumulated a combined 7-3 record and 3.62 ERA with 112 strikeouts over 107 innings of work.

Lugo did not play in a game in 2020 due to the cancellation of the minor league season because of the COVID-19 pandemic. He returned to action in 2021 with Tennessee and the Triple–A Iowa Cubs. In 25 games (20 starts) between the two affiliates, Lugo registered a 6–10 record and 5.02 ERA with 100 strikeouts across 95 innings of work. He elected free agency following the season on November 7, 2021.

== Coaching Career ==
In 2026, he was named as an assistant pitching coach for the ACL Padres the rookie-level affiliate of the San Diego Padres.

== International baseball ==
Lugo was selected as a member of the Italy national baseball team at the 2017 World Baseball Classic. He also played for Team Italy at the 2019 European Baseball Championship. He is playing for the team at the Africa/Europe 2020 Olympic Qualification tournament, taking place in Italy beginning September 18, 2019.

== See also ==
- Rule 5 draft results
