= Blake Ochoa =

Venezuelan baseball player (born 1985)

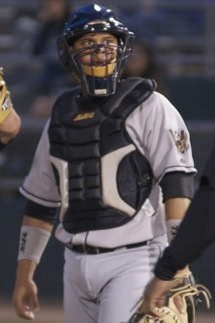
- Ochoa playing for the Wisconsin Timber Rattlers in 2008
- Catcher
- Born: September 5, 1985 (age 40); Maracay, Venezuela
- Bats: Right Throws: Right
- Stats at Baseball Reference

Blake Ochoa (born September 5, 1985) is a Venezuelan former professional baseball catcher, who played with the Spain national baseball team and several minor league teams in the United States.

== Career ==
Ochoa was born in Venezuela and signed as an undrafted free agent by the Florida Marlins in 2005. After starting his career in the Venezuelan Summer League, he was moved by the Marlins to the Gulf Coast League, the Florida State League and the New York–Penn League. He was in the Seattle Mariners organization from 2007 through 2010, and played for the independent Washington Wild Things of the Frontier League in 2011.

== International career ==
Ochoa also played for the Spain national baseball team in the 2013 World Baseball Classic and the 2019 European Baseball Championship. He played for the team at the Africa/Europe 2020 Olympic Qualification tournament, in Italy in September 2019.
