= Mladé Buky =

- Market town
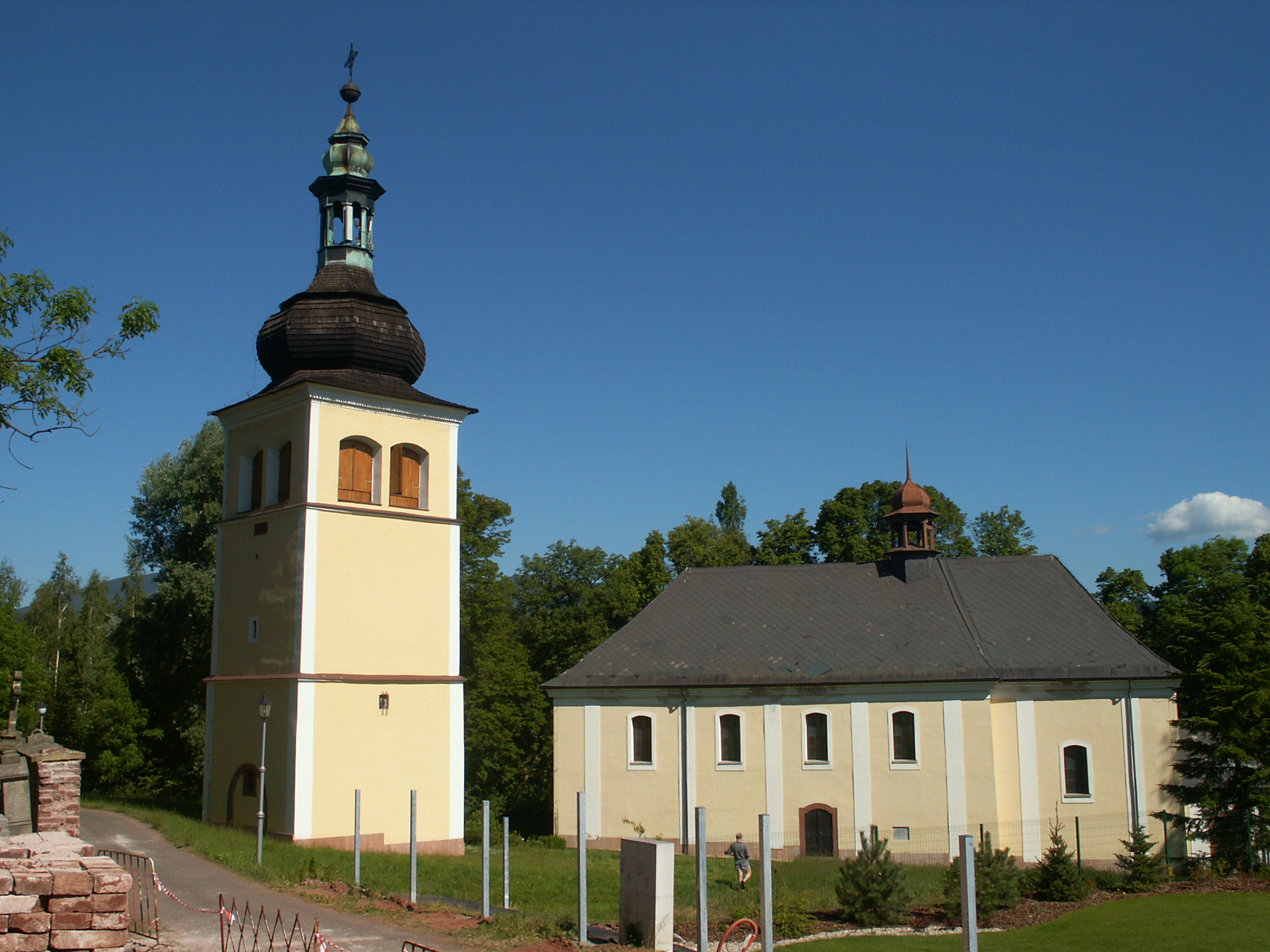
- Church of Saint Catherine

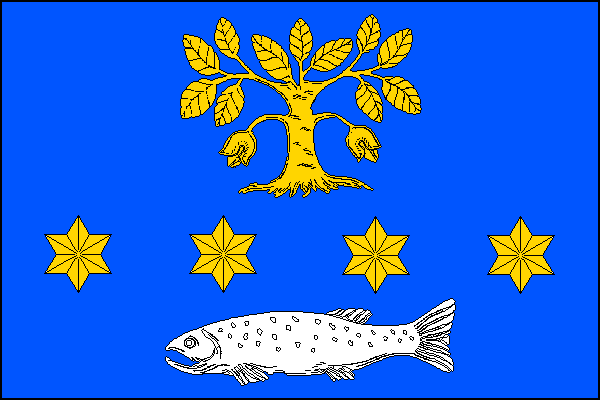
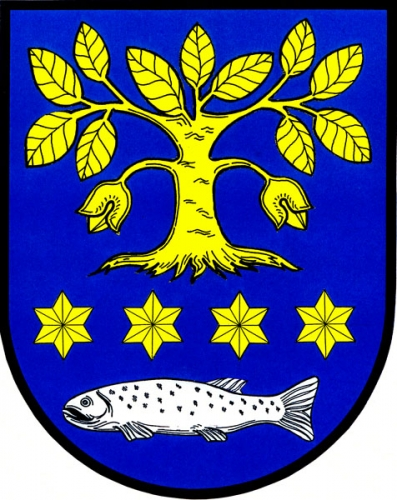
- Flag Coat of arms

- Location in the Czech Republic
- Coordinates: 50°36′23″N 15°50′0″E
- Country: Czech Republic
- Region: Hradec Králové
- District: Trutnov
- First mentioned: 1355

Area
  - Total: 26.79 km^{2} (10.34 sq mi)
- Elevation: 476 m (1,562 ft)

Population (2026-01-01)
  - Total: 2,301
  - Density: 85.89/km^{2} (222.5/sq mi)
- Time zone: UTC+1 (CET)
  - Summer (DST): UTC+2 (CEST)
- Postal code: 542 23
- Website: www.mestysmladebuky.cz

Mladé Buky (Czech pronunciation: [ˈmladɛː ˈbukɪ]; German: Jungbuch) is a market town in Trutnov District in the Hradec Králové Region of the Czech Republic. It has about 2,300 inhabitants.

== Administrative division ==
Mladé Buky consists of four municipal parts (in brackets population according to the 2021 census):

- Mladé Buky (1,756)
- Hertvíkovice (181)
- Kalná Voda (289)
- Sklenářovice (2)

== Etymology ==
The name means 'young beeches' in Czech. It refers to the forest located on both banks of the Úpa River when the settlement was founded.

== Geography ==
Mladé Buky is located about 5 km (3 mi) northwest of Trutnov and 44 km (27 mi) north of Hradec Králové. The southern part of the municipal territory with the built-up area lies in the Giant Mountains Foothills. The northern part lies in the Giant Mountains and within the Krkonoše National Park. The highest point is a mountain at 1,013 m (3,323 ft) above sea level. The Úpa River flows through the market town.

== History ==
According to local legend, Mladé Buky was founded in 1008 and Hertvíkovice in 1010. The first written mention of Mladé Buky is from 1355, when it belonged to the Trutnov estate. Hertvíkovice was first mentioned in 1455.

== Demographics ==
Historical population

| Year | Pop. | ±% |
|---|---|---|
| 1869 | 3,407 | — |
| 1880 | 4,040 | +18.6% |
| 1890 | 4,939 | +22.3% |
| 1900 | 5,251 | +6.3% |
| 1910 | 5,435 | +3.5% |

| Year | Pop. | ±% |
|---|---|---|
| 1921 | 4,577 | −15.8% |
| 1930 | 4,887 | +6.8% |
| 1950 | 2,488 | −49.1% |
| 1961 | 2,471 | −0.7% |
| 1970 | 2,351 | −4.9% |

| Year | Pop. | ±% |
|---|---|---|
| 1980 | 2,112 | −10.2% |
| 1991 | 2,042 | −3.3% |
| 2001 | 2,209 | +8.2% |
| 2011 | 2,149 | −2.7% |
| 2021 | 2,228 | +3.7% |

Source: Censuses

== Transport ==
The I/14 road (the section from Liberec to Trutnov) runs through the market town.

Mladé Buky is located on the railway line heading from Hradec Králové and Trutnov to Svoboda nad Úpou.

== Sights ==
The main landmark of Mladé Buky is the Church of Saint Catherine. It dates from the second half of the 13th century. In 1777, it was reconstructed in the late Baroque style, but it retained its Gothic core. Next to the church is a separate bell tower, dating from 1599.
